= Your Face Sounds Familiar Kids (Philippine TV series) season 2 =

Your Face Sounds Familiar Kids
- Season 2
- Hosted by: Billy Crawford
- Judges: Gary Valenciano (Week 1-2, and 13-16); Sharon Cuneta; Ogie Alcasid
- Winner: TNT Boys
- Runner-up: Onyok Pineda
- Finals venue: UP Theater, Osmeña Avenue, UP Campus, Diliman, Quezon City
- Companion show: Your Face Sounds Familiar Kids: Breaktime (Digital)
- No. of episodes: 32

Release
- Original network: ABS-CBN; Yey! (Take 2, recap from previous week); Jeepney TV (Weekdays, recap); The Filipino Channel (International broadcaster)
- Original release: May 5 – August 19, 2018

Season chronology
- ← Previous; Season 1

The second season of Your Face Sounds Familiar Kids was a singing and impersonation competition for child celebrities on ABS-CBN from May 5 to August 19, 2018, replacing the sixth season of Pilipinas Got Talent and was replaced by The Kids' Choice. Gary Valenciano, Sharon Cuneta, and Ogie Alcasid reprised their jury duties. Jed Madela, a judge in the first and second seasons of the regular edition, and Nyoy Volante, season 1 runner-up, served as the mentors of the contestants. Billy Crawford also returns as the host.

After 16 weeks, Keifer Sanchez, Mackie Empuerto, and Francis Concepcion, collectively known as the TNT Boys emerged as the winner, garnering 100% of the judges' and public votes.

The season was re-aired from January 2019 to February 2019 every Weeknights at 7:15 PM on Jeepney TV.

== Development ==
Several teasers were aired in the network from April 2018 onwards. Jed Madela and Nyoy Volante were later revealed to be the kids' mentors. The show premiered on May 5, 2018, and ran until August 19, 2018.

In Week 15, the show had a duet weekend, in which the contestants of the season had a duet with the contestants of the prior season, however, as Xia Vigor had prior commitments, Bella Echarri filled in for Vigor. Except for Chun-sa Jung is the only contestant who did not win in any weekly competition of the show, meaning she received no prizes before the conclusion of the grand showdown and the hosts Robi Domingo and Eric Nicolas debuts on September 1, the judges Vigor, Jung, Pineda, Carlos Mendoza and Jayden Villegas on the talent show The Kids' Choice. After the Grand Showdown, the show held a special thanksgiving concert titled All-Star Reunion Special.

=== Prize ===
Every week, the winner will win a cash prize of 100,000 pesos, half will be given to his or her chosen charity. The grand prize of the competition is a 1 million peso cash prize. Other prizes for the grand winner include a gadget showcase and a house and lot.

== Hosts, Judges, and mentors ==
The host and judges of Your Face Sounds Familiar

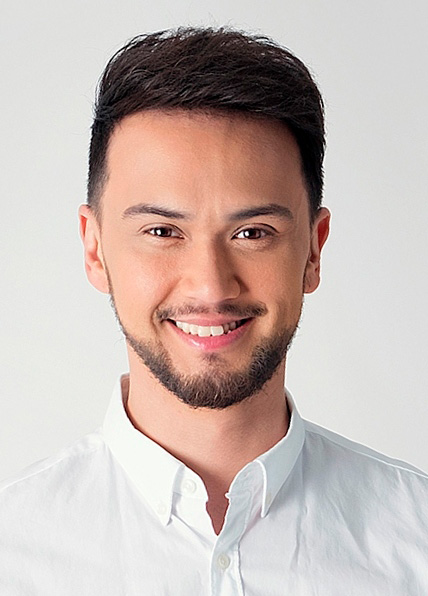
Billy Crawford

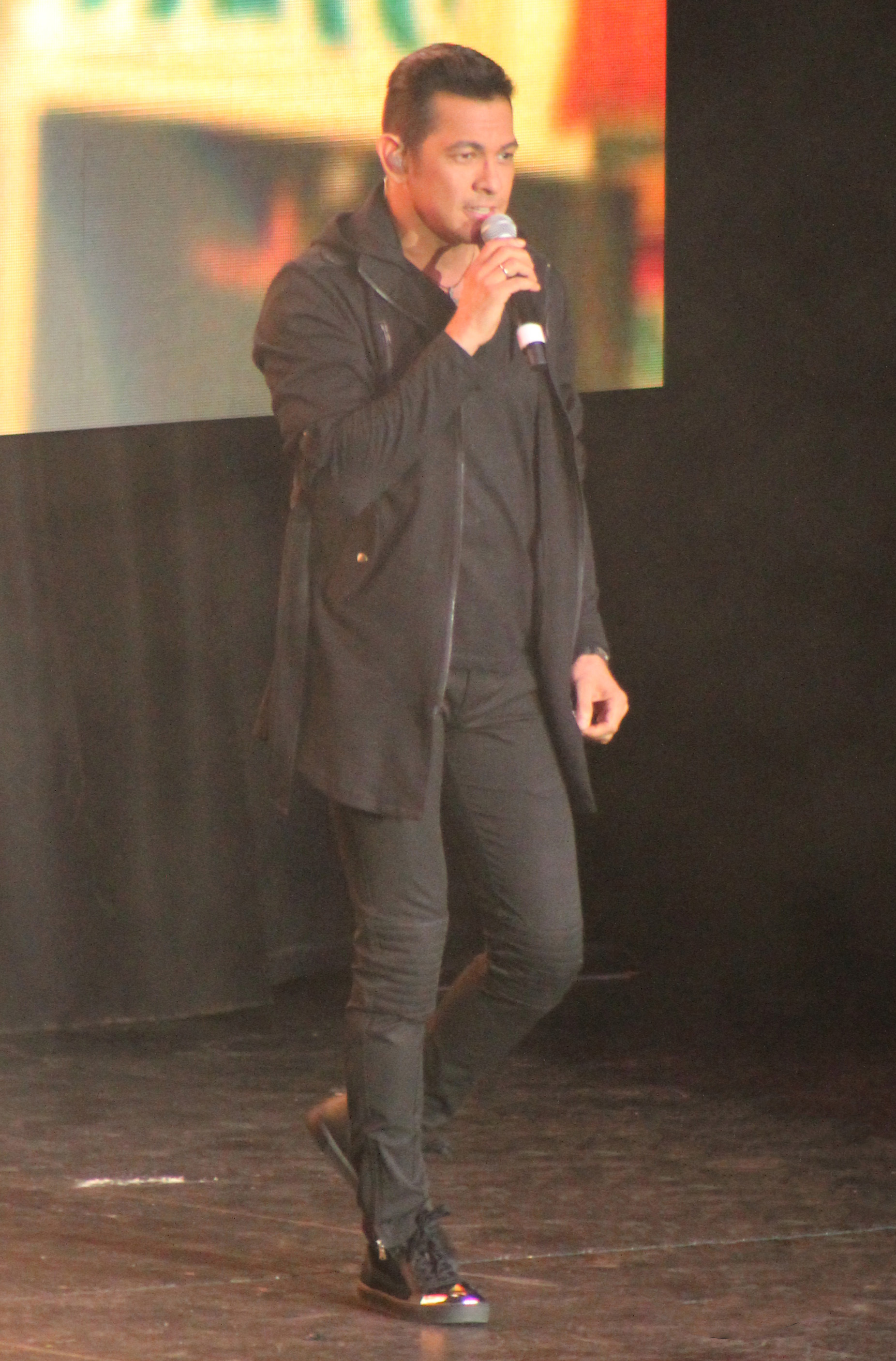
Gary Valenciano

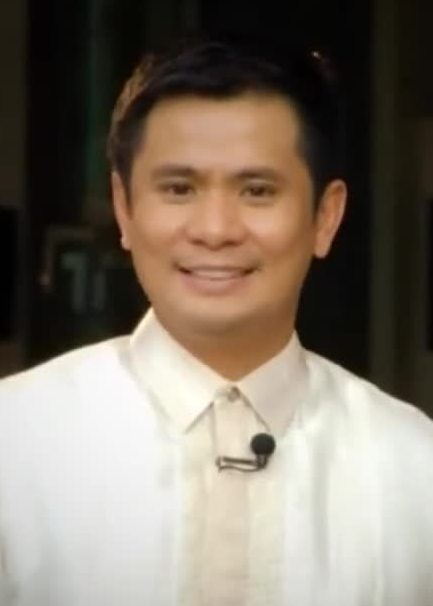
Ogie Alcasid

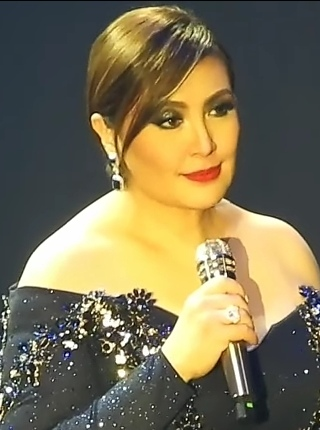
Sharon Cuneta

=== Host ===
Billy Crawford returns as the main host.

==== Online show hosts ====
The online companion show Your Face Sounds Familiar Kids: Breaktime is hosted by kids season 1 contestants Sam Shoaf, AC Bonifacio and Awra Briguela. It airs simultaneously with the main show, being streamed live on both the official Facebook page and YouTube channel of the show.

Breaktime features behind-the-scene exclusives which are usually not aired on the main show. It also includes interviews of the cast and live comments/tweets from the viewers.

=== Judges ===
The judges, dubbed as "The Jury" in the show:

The Jury

- Ogie Alcasid
- Sharon Cuneta
- Gary Valenciano

Guest judges

Juror Gary Valenciano missed most of the season due to his heart surgery and was temporarily replaced by the mentors.

- Nyoy Volante and Jed Madela (Valenciano's replacement judges for Week 3 to Week 10)
- Nyoy Volante (Valenciano's replacement judge for Week 11 and 12)

=== Mentors ===
In this season, Jed Madela (vocals) and Nyoy Volante (choreography and movement) serves as the kids' mentors, replacing Annie Quintos of The Company for vocals and Georcelle Dapat of the G-Force for choreography.

Guest Mentors

Season 1 finalist Jay R co-mentored with Jed Madela for Week 11 and replaced him for Week 12, 13 and 14.

== Contestants ==
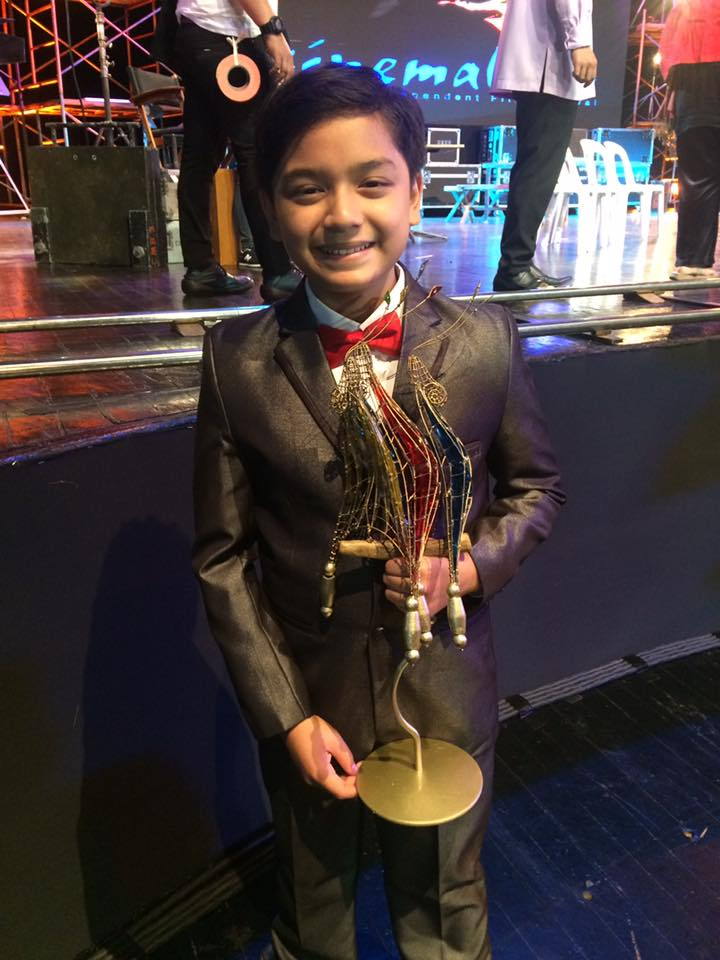
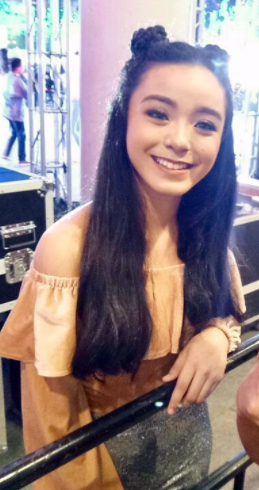
From left to right: Noel Comia Jr., Sheena Belarmino

The following are participating performers for the competition. They were revealed on April 17, 2018.

Celebrity performers of Your Face Sounds Familiar Kids 2
Contestant	Notability	Result
TNT Boys (Keifer Sanchez, Mackie Empuerto and Francis Concepcion)	Singing Trio	Winner (3 wins, 270 stars)
Onyok Pineda	Child actor	Second Place (1 win, 210 stars)
Esang de Torres	Singer and stage actress	Third Place (2 wins, 255 stars)
Sheena Belarmino	Singer and dancer	Fourth Place (5 wins, 261 stars)
Krystal Brimner	Singer and actress	Fifth Place (2 wins, 244 stars)
Noel Comia Jr.	Singer and stage actor	Sixth Place (1 win, 218 stars)
Chun-sa Jung	Child actress	Seventh Place (0 wins, 219 stars)
Marco Masa	Child actor	Eighth Place (1 win, 214 stars)

== Results summary ==
The table below shows the corresponding points earned each week. Unlike in the regular seasons, points are called stars instead, and instead of giving three points to other performers, the jury gives four stars to the lower-ranked contestants.

Legend

- Winner
- Runner-up
- Third place
- Fourth place
- Fifth place
- Sixth place
- Seventh place
- Eighth place
- Final Total Stars
- Contestant won that particular week
- Contestant placed last that particular week

Contestant	Week 1	Week 2	Week 3	Week 4	Week 5	Week 6	Week 7	Week 8	Week 9	Week 10	Week 11	Week 12	Week 13	Week 14	Week 15	Final Total Stars	Finals
TNT Boys	3rd 17 stars	2nd–3rd 19 stars	4th 17 stars	1st 22 stars	4th–5th 15 stars	2nd 21 stars	4th–6th 13 stars	1st 24 stars	2nd–3rd 18 stars	4th–5th 15 stars	3rd–6th 14 stars	5th 14 stars	2nd 20 stars	2nd 18 stars	1st 23 stars	1st 270 stars	Winner; 100.00%
Onyok	6th–8th 12 stars	7th–8th 12 stars	6th–8th 12 stars	5th 14 stars	7th–8th 12 stars	6th–8th 12 stars	1st 24 stars	6th–8th 12 stars	6th–8th 12 stars	6th–8th 12 stars	2nd 22 stars	7th–8th 12 stars	7th–8th 12 stars	4th–5th 15 stars	4th 15 stars	8th 210 stars	2nd Place; 67.59%
Esang	6th–8th 12 stars	7th–8th 12 stars	2nd–3rd 18 stars	2nd 21 stars	1st 22 stars	6th–8th 12 stars	2nd 21 stars	3rd 16 stars	2nd–3rd 18 stars	2nd–3rd 19 stars	3rd–6th 14 stars	6th 13 stars	1st 24 stars	7th–8th 12 stars	2nd 21 stars	3rd 255 stars	3rd Place; 58.52%
Sheena	1st 23 stars	4th–5th 14 stars	5th 13 stars	4th 15 stars	3rd 16 stars	6th–8th 12 stars	3rd 18 stars	5th 14 stars	1st 24 stars	1st 22 stars	3rd–6th 14 stars	1st 23 stars	5th–6th 13 stars	1st 24 stars	3rd 16 stars	2nd 261 stars	4th Place; 58.30%
Krystal	2nd 22 stars	2nd–3rd 19 stars	1st 24 stars	7th–8th 12 stars	4th–5th 15 stars	1st 23 stars	7th–8th 12 stars	2nd 21 stars	6th–8th 12 stars	4th–5th 15 stars	3rd–6th 14 stars	2nd 18 stars	5th–6th 13 stars	7th–8th 12 stars	7th–8th 12 stars	4th 244 stars	5th Place; 48.12%
Noel	6th–8th 12 stars	1st 23 stars	6th–8th 12 stars	6th 13 stars	2nd 21 stars	5th 13 stars	4th–6th 13 stars	4th 15 stars	6th–8th 12 stars	6th–8th 12 stars	8th 12 stars	3rd–4th 17 stars	7th–8th 12 stars	3rd 17 stars	6th 13 stars	6th 218 stars	6th Place; 42.54%
Chun-sa	4th 15 stars	4th–5th 14 stars	2nd–3rd 18 stars	7th–8th 12 stars	6th 13 stars	3rd 19 stars	4th–6th 13 stars	6th–8th 12 stars	4th–5th 15 stars	6th–8th 12 stars	7th 13 stars	3rd–4th 17 stars	3rd 17 stars	4th–5th 15 stars	5th 14 stars	5th 219 stars	7th Place; 41.59%
Marco	5th 13 stars	6th 13 stars	6th–8th 12 stars	3rd 17 stars	7th–8th 12 stars	4th 14 stars	7th–8th 12 stars	6th–8th 12 stars	4th–5th 15 stars	2nd–3rd 19 stars	1st 23 stars	7th–8th 12 stars	4th 15 stars	6th 13 stars	7th–8th 12 stars	7th 214 stars	8th Place; 41.23%

== Performances ==
The eight performances are divided into two nights – four contestants perform on Saturdays and the remaining four on Sundays.

Color key

- Contestant won that particular week
- Contestant placed last that particular week

=== Week 1 (May 5 & 6) ===
Episode hashtag

- #YourFaceSoundsFamiliarKids (Saturday)
- #YFSFKids (Sunday)

Order	Contestant	Performance	Stars				Rank
Order	Contestant	Performance	Ogie	Sharon	Gary	Total	Rank
1	TNT Boys	Maurice Gibb, Robin Gibb and Barry Gibb of Bee Gees – "Too Much Heaven"	6	6	5	17	3rd
2	Chun-sa Jung	Meghan Trainor – "All About That Bass"	4	5	6	15	4th
3	Onyok Pineda	Bamboo Mañalac of Bamboo – "Hallelujah"	4	4	4	12	6th–8th
4	Krystal Brimner	Miley Cyrus – "Wrecking Ball"	7	7	8	22	2nd
5	Sheena Belarmino	Sarah Geronimo – "Tala"	8	8	7	23	1st
6	Noel Comia Jr.	Michael Jackson – "Rock with You"	4	4	4	12	6th–8th
7	Esang de Torres	Lady Gaga – "Paparazzi"	4	4	4	12	6th–8th
8	Marco Masa	Bruno Mars – "The Lazy Song"	5	4	4	13	5th

=== Week 2 (May 12 & 13) ===
Episode hashtag

- #YFSFK2ThumbsUp (Saturday)
- #YFSFKMothersDay (Sunday)

Order	Contestant	Performance	Stars				Rank
Order	Contestant	Performance	Ogie	Sharon	Gary	Total	Rank
1	Chun-sa Jung	Sandara Park of 2NE1 – "Fire"	5	5	4	14	4th–5th
2	TNT Boys	APO Hiking Society – "Mahirap Magmahal ng Syota ng Iba"	7	4	8	19	2nd–3rd
3	Sheena Belarmino	Whitney Houston – "I Have Nothing"	4	6	4	14	4th–5th
4	Marco Masa	Moira Dela Torre – "Titibo-Tibo"	4	4	5	13	6th
5	Esang de Torres	Cher – "Believe"	4	4	4	12	7th–8th
6	Onyok Pineda	apl.de.ap of Black Eyed Peas – "Bebot"	4	4	4	12	7th–8th
7	Krystal Brimner	Stevie Wonder – "Overjoyed"	6	7	6	19	2nd–3rd
8	Noel Comia Jr.	Pepe Smith of Juan de la Cruz Band — "Beep Beep"	8	8	7	23	1st

=== Week 3 (May 19 & 20) ===
Gary Valenciano had an emergency heart surgery weeks before the taping. Mentors Jed Madela and Nyoy Volante served as the guest judges until week 12. They gave stars to the kid celebrity performers as one.

Guest jurors

- Nyoy Volante and Jed Madela (replacement for Gary Valenciano; score counts as one)

Episode hashtag

- #YFSFAmazingKids (Saturday)
- #YFSFBoomBoom (Sunday)

Order	Contestant	Performance	Stars				Rank
Order	Contestant	Performance	Ogie	Sharon	Jed & Nyoy	Total	Rank
1	Sheena Belarmino	Chris Brown– "Yeah 3x"	4	4	5	13	5th
2	TNT Boys	Salbakuta – "S2pid Luv"	7	6	4	17	4th
3	Noel Comia Jr.	Tina Turner – "What's Love Got to Do with It"	4	4	4	12	6th–8th
4	Chun-sa Jung	Taylor Swift – "Shake It Off"	5	7	6	18	2nd–3rd
5	Krystal Brimner	Jessie J – "Domino"	8	8	8	24	1st
6	Marco Masa	Yoyoy Villame – "Mag-Exercise Tayo"	4	4	4	12	6th–8th
7	Onyok Pineda	Elvis Presley – "(Let Me Be Your) Teddy Bear"	4	4	4	12	6th–8th
8	Esang de Torres	Lea Salonga – "On My Own"	6	5	7	18	2nd–3rd

=== Week 4 (May 26 & 27) ===
Guest jurors

- Nyoy Volante and Jed Madela (replacement for Gary Valenciano; score counts as one)

Episode hashtag

- #YFSFKDreamComeTrue (Saturday)
- #YFSFKFeelNaFeel (Sunday)

Order	Contestant	Performance	Stars				Rank
Order	Contestant	Performance	Ogie	Sharon	Jed & Nyoy	Total	Rank
1	Krystal Brimner	Britney Spears – "Oops!... I Did It Again"	4	4	4	12	7th–8th
2	TNT Boys	Destiny's Child – "Survivor"	8	8	6	22	1st
3	Esang de Torres	John Legend – "All of Me"	7	6	8	21	2nd
4	Chun-sa Jung	Vilma Santos – "Sixteen"	4	4	4	12	7th–8th
5	Sheena Belarmino	Jennifer Lopez – "On the Floor"	4	4	7	15	4th
6	Onyok Pineda	Francis Magalona – "Ito ang Gusto Ko"	5	4	5	14	5th
7	Noel Comia Jr.	Ed Sheeran – "Perfect"	4	5	4	13	6th
8	Marco Masa	Ricky Martin – "Livin' la Vida Loca"	6	7	4	17	3rd

=== Week 5 (June 2 & 3) ===
Guest jurors

- Nyoy Volante and Jed Madela (replacement for Gary Valenciano; score counts as one)

Episode hashtag

- #YFSFKPasiklaban (Saturday)
- #YFSFKMagalingMagaling (Sunday)

Order	Contestant	Performance	Stars				Rank
Order	Contestant	Performance	Ogie	Sharon	Jed & Nyoy	Total	Rank
1	TNT Boys	Juliet Sunot, Rey Abenoja and Mercy Sunot of Aegis – "Sinta"	7	4	4	15	4th–5th
2	Marco Masa	Jon Bon Jovi of Bon Jovi – "Livin' on a Prayer"	4	4	4	12	7th–8th
3	Krystal Brimner	Pilita Corrales – "Kapantay ay Langit"	4	4	7	15	4th–5th
4	Chun-sa Jung	Pink – "Get the Party Started"	4	5	4	13	6th
5	Onyok Pineda	Jolina Magdangal – "Chuva Choo Choo"	4	4	4	12	7th–8th
6	Noel Comia Jr.	Barry Manilow – "Somewhere Down the Road"	6	7	8	21	2nd
7	Sheena Belarmino	Nicki Minaj – "Starships"	5	6	5	16	3rd
8	Esang de Torres	Christina Aguilera – "Beautiful"	8	8	6	22	1st

=== Week 6 (June 9 & 10) ===
Guest jurors

- Nyoy Volante and Jed Madela (replacement for Gary Valenciano; score counts as one)

Episode hashtag

- #YFSFKTodoTuwa (Saturday)
- #YFSFKHighestLevel (Sunday)

Order	Contestant	Performance	Stars				Rank
Order	Contestant	Performance	Ogie	Sharon	Jed & Nyoy	Total	Rank
1	Chun-sa Jung	Psy – "Gentleman"	6	7	6	19	3rd
2	TNT Boys	The Supremes – "You Can't Hurry Love"	8	6	7	21	2nd
3	Esang de Torres	Jake Zyrus – "Hiling"	4	4	4	12	6th–8th
4	Onyok Pineda	Rod Stewart – "Hot Legs"	4	4	4	12	6th–8th
5	Krystal Brimner	Alicia Keys – "Empire State of Mind (Part II) Broken Down"	7	8	8	23	1st
6	Marco Masa	Justin Bieber – "Sorry"	5	5	4	14	4th
7	Noel Comia Jr.	Rico J. Puno – "Sorry Na, Pwede Ba?"	4	4	5	13	5th
8	Sheena Belarmino	Regine Velasquez – "Dadalhin"	4	4	4	12	6th–8th

=== Week 7 (June 16 & 17) ===
Guest jurors

- Nyoy Volante and Jed Madela (replacement for Gary Valenciano; score counts as one)

Episode hashtag

- #YFSFKGigilSaSaya (Saturday)
- #YFSFKArawNiTatay (Sunday)

Order	Contestant	Performance	Stars				Rank
Order	Contestant	Performance	Ogie	Sharon	Jed & Nyoy	Total	Rank
1	Krystal Brimner	Sam Smith – "Lay Me Down"	4	4	4	12	7th–8th
2	TNT Boys	Bernie Fineza, Sonny Parsons and Mike Respall of Hagibis – "Nanggigigil"	4	4	5	13	4th–6th
3	Esang de Torres	Cyndi Lauper – "True Colors"	7	7	7	21	2nd
4	Chun-sa Jung	Katy Perry – "California Gurls"	4	5	4	13	4th–6th
5	Sheena Belarmino	Ariana Grande – "Problem"	6	6	6	18	3rd
6	Marco Masa	Yeng Constantino – "Paasa (T.A.N.G.A.)"	4	4	4	12	7th–8th
7	Onyok Pineda	Freddie Aguilar – "Bulag, Pipi at Bingi"	8	8	8	24	1st
8	Noel Comia Jr.	Frank Sinatra– "Fly Me to the Moon"	5	4	4	13	4th–6th

=== Week 8 (June 23 & 24) ===
Guest jurors

- Nyoy Volante and Jed Madela (replacement for Gary Valenciano; score counts as one)

Episode hashtag

- #YFSFKSorpreSabado (Saturday)
- #YFSFKFamiLinggo (Sunday)

Order	Contestant	Performance	Stars				Rank
Order	Contestant	Performance	Ogie	Sharon	Jed & Nyoy	Total	Rank
1	Onyok Pineda	Coco Martin – "Peksman"	4	4	4	12	6th–8th
2	TNT Boys	Mariah Carey with Nathan Morris and Shawn Stockman of Boyz II Men – "One Sweet Day"	8	8	8	24	1st
3	Krystal Brimner	Dionne Warwick – "I Say a Little Prayer"	7	7	7	21	2nd
4	Chun-sa Jung	Edgar Mortiz – "My Pledge of Love"	4	4	4	12	6th–8th
5	Sheena Belarmino	Darren Espanto – "In Love Ako Sa'yo"	4	6	4	14	5th
6	Esang de Torres	Adele – "Hello"	6	5	5	16	3rd
7	Marco Masa	Randy Santiago – "Babaero"	4	4	4	12	6th–8th
8	Noel Comia Jr.	Bob Marley of Bob Marley & the Wailers – "Waiting in Vain"	5	4	6	15	4th

=== Week 9 (June 30 & July 1) ===
Guest jurors

- Nyoy Volante and Jed Madela (replacement for Gary Valenciano; score counts as one)

Episode hashtag

- #YFSFKSaturYey (Saturday)
- #YFSFKLingGoals (Sunday)

Order	Contestant	Performance	Stars				Rank
Order	Contestant	Performance	Ogie	Sharon	Jed & Nyoy	Total	Rank
1	TNT Boys	Scary Spice, Baby Spice and Ginger Spice of the Spice Girls – "Spice Up Your Life"	4	7	7	18	2nd–3rd
2	Onyok Pineda	Arnel Pineda of Journey – "Faithfully"	4	4	4	12	6th–8th
3	Krystal Brimner	Sheena Easton – "Almost Over You"	4	4	4	12	6th–8th
4	Chun-sa Jung	Madonna – "Holiday"	6	5	4	15	4th–5th
5	Sheena Belarmino	KZ Tandingan – "Rolling in the Deep"	8	8	8	24	1st
6	Marco Masa	Charlie Puth – "One Call Away"	5	4	6	15	4th–5th
7	Esang de Torres	Bonnie Tyler – "Holding Out for a Hero"	7	6	5	18	2nd–3rd
8	Noel Comia Jr.	Justin Timberlake – "Can't Stop the Feeling!	4	4	4	12	6th–8th

=== Week 10 (July 7 & 8) ===
Sheena Belarmino is the first contestant in the Kids version, but second contestant (the first being Kean Cipriano in the second season of Your Face Sounds Familiar) among all Philippine version, to earn a back-to-back win.

Theme

- OPM week

Guest jurors

- Nyoy Volante and Jed Madela (replacement for Gary Valenciano; score counts as one)

Episode hashtag

- #YFSFKLovesOPM (Saturday)
- #YFSFKPinoyMusic (Sunday)

Order	Contestant	Performance	Stars				Rank
Order	Contestant	Performance	Ogie	Sharon	Jed & Nyoy	Total	Rank
1	Sheena Belarmino	Jessa Zaragoza – "Bakit Pa?"	8	8	6	22	1st
2	Chun-sa Jung	Sheryl Cruz – "Mr. Dreamboy"	4	4	4	12	6th–8th
3	TNT Boys	Vic Sotto, Spanky Rigor and Tito Sotto of VST & Co. – "Swing It, Baby"	4	4	7	15	4th–5th
4	Onyok Pineda	Daniel Padilla – "Nasa Iyo Na ang Lahat"	4	4	4	12	6th–8th
5	Marco Masa	Iñigo Pascual – "Dahil Sa'yo"	7	7	5	19	2nd–3rd
6	Noel Comia Jr.	Martin Nievera – "Say That You Love Me"	4	4	4	12	6th–8th
7	Krystal Brimner	Zsa Zsa Padilla – "Mambobola"	6	5	4	15	4th–5th
8	Esang de Torres	Joey Albert – "Tell Me"	5	6	8	19	2nd–3rd

=== Week 11 (July 14 & 15) ===
Guest jurors

- Nyoy Volante (replacement for Gary Valenciano)

Guest mentors

- Jay R (co-mentoring with Jed Madela)

Episode hashtag

- #YFSFKSabaDoIt (Saturday)
- #YFSFKMagalinggo (Sunday)

Order	Contestant	Performance	Stars				Rank
Order	Contestant	Performance	Ogie	Sharon	Nyoy	Total	Rank
1	Esang de Torres	Freddie Mercury of Queen – "I Want to Break Free"	6	4	4	14	3rd–6th
2	Onyok Pineda	Louis Armstrong – "What a Wonderful World"	7	7	8	22	2nd
3	Chun-sa Jung	Shakira – "Waka Waka (This Time for Africa)"	4	5	4	13	7th
4	TNT Boys	Do Re Mi – "I Can"	5	4	5	14	3rd–6th
5	Sheena Belarmino	Sharon Cuneta – "Pangarap na Bituin"	4	4	6	14	3rd–6th
6	Marco Masa	Enrique Gil – "Mobe"	8	8	7	23	1st
7	Krystal Brimner	Toni Gonzaga – "Catch Me, I'm Falling"	4	6	4	14	3rd–6th
8	Noel Comia Jr.	Elton John – "Goodbye Yellow Brick Road"	4	4	4	12	8th

=== Week 12 (July 21 & 22) ===
Guest jurors

- Nyoy Volante (replacement for Gary Valenciano)

Guest mentors

- Jay R (replacement for Jed Madela)

Episode hashtag

- #YFSFKKumpleTuwa (Saturday)
- #YFSFKTodoTalento (Sunday)

Order	Contestant	Performance	Stars				Rank
Order	Contestant	Performance	Ogie	Sharon	Nyoy	Total	Rank
1	Noel Comia Jr.	Blakdyak – "Modelong Charing"	7	4	6	17	3rd–4th
2	TNT Boys	Luciano Pavarotti, Plácido Domingo and José Carreras of The Three Tenors – "'O sole mio"	4	5	5	14	5th
3	Sheena Belarmino	Olivia Newton-John – "Hopelessly Devoted to You"	8	8	7	23	1st
4	Marco Masa	James Reid – "Natataranta"	4	4	4	12	7th–8th
5	Chun-sa Jung	Nancy of Momoland – "Bboom Bboom"	6	7	4	17	3rd–4th
6	Onyok Pineda	Ely Buendia of Eraserheads – "Ligaya"	4	4	4	12	7th–8th
7	Esang de Torres	Julie Andrews – "The Sound of Music"	5	4	4	13	6th
8	Krystal Brimner	Avril Lavigne – "Complicated"	4	6	8	18	2nd

=== Week 13 (July 28 & 29) ===
Guest mentors

- Jay R (replacement for Jed Madela)

Episode hashtag

- #YFSFKGVReturns (Saturday)
- #YFSFKBigayTodo (Sunday)

Order	Contestant	Performance	Stars				Rank
Order	Contestant	Performance	Ogie	Sharon	Gary	Total	Rank
1	Noel Comia Jr.	Tom Jones – "Kiss"	4	4	4	12	7th–8th
2	TNT Boys	Christina Aguilera, Mýa and P!nk – "Lady Marmalade"	7	7	6	20	2nd
3	Chun-sa Jung	Janet Jackson – "Miss You Much"	4	6	7	17	3rd
4	Onyok Pineda	Mike Hanopol of Juan de la Cruz Band – "Laki sa Layaw"	4	4	4	12	7th–8th
5	Esang de Torres	Liza Minnelli – "New York, New York"	8	8	8	24	1st
6	Sheena Belarmino	Donna Summer – "MacArthur Park"	4	4	5	13	5th–6th
7	Krystal Brimner	Marilyn Monroe – "Diamonds Are a Girl's Best Friend"	5	4	4	13	5th–6th
8	Marco Masa	Vanilla Ice – "Ice Ice Baby"	6	5	4	15	4th

=== Week 14 (August 4 & 5) ===
Guest Mentors

- Jay R (replacement for Jed Madela)

Episode hashtag

- #YFSFKAgostoKoTo (Saturday)
- #YFSFKWonderKids (Sunday)

Order	Contestant	Performance	Stars				Rank
Order	Contestant	Performance	Ogie	Sharon	Gary	Total	Rank
1	Sheena Belarmino	Alanis Morissette – "Hand in My Pocket"	8	8	8	24	1st
2	TNT Boys	Yubin, Sohee and Sunye of Wonder Girls – "Nobody"	7	7	4	18	2nd
3	Marco Masa	George Michael of Wham! – "Wake Me Up Before You Go-Go"	4	5	4	13	6th
4	Onyok Pineda	Lolita Carbon of Asin – "Masdan Mo ang Kapaligiran"	4	4	7	15	4th–5th
5	Esang de Torres	Aretha Franklin – "Respect"	4	4	4	12	7th–8th
6	Noel Comia Jr.	Michael Bublé – "Sway"	6	6	5	17	3rd
7	Krystal Brimner	Toni Braxton – "You Mean the World to Me"	4	4	4	12	7th–8th
8	Chun-sa Jung	Sampaguita – "Sayawan"	5	4	6	15	4th–5th

=== Week 15 (August 11 & 12) ===
As of this week, Chun-sa Jung is the only contestant, among the Kids version, who hasn't won any weekly challenges.

Week's Challenge

- Duet with the kids season 1 contestants

Episode hashtag

- #YFSFKSabaDuets (Saturday)
- #YFSFKRoadToGrandShowdown (Sunday)

Order	Contestants	Performance	Stars				Rank
Order	Contestants	Performance	Ogie	Sharon	Gary	Total	Rank
1	Noel Comia Jr. with Elha Nympha	Kenny Rogers and Dolly Parton – "Islands in the Stream"	5	4	4	13	6th
2	TNT Boys with Sam Shoaf	ABBA – "Mamma Mia"	8	7	8	23	1st
3	Marco Masa with Lyca Gairanod	Tirso Cruz III and Nora Aunor – "Together Again"	4	4	4	12	7th–8th
4	Esang de Torres with Awra Briguela	Jaya and Elizabeth Ramsey – "Proud Mary"	6	8	7	21	2nd
5	Chun-sa Jung with Alonzo Muhlach	Lene Nystrøm and René Dif of Aqua – "Barbie Girl"	4	4	6	14	5th
6	Krystal Brimner with Justin Alva	Kylie Minogue and Jason Donovan – "Especially for You"	4	4	4	12	7th–8th
7	Onyok Pineda with Bella Echarri (Note: Xia Vigor could not perform due to prior commitments. Because of this, Bella Echarri, sister of Kyle Echarri, was invited to perform.)	John Travolta and Olivia Newton-John – "You're the One That I Want"	4	6	5	15	4th
8	Sheena Belarmino with AC Bonifacio	Miley Cyrus and Ariana Grande – "Don't Dream It's Over"	7	5	4	16	3rd

=== Finals: Week 16 (August 18 & 19) ===
Unlike in the previous seasons, the Grand Showdown was held in UP Theater, University of the Philippines Diliman instead of Newport Performing Arts Theater. All eight contestants were chosen to compete for the grand prize.

During the second night, Joshua Garcia and Julia Barretto appeared on the show to promote their then-upcoming series "Ngayon at Kailanman" was premiered on August 20, 2018.

Non-competition performances

- Joshua Garcia and Julia Barretto - "No Touch" by Juan de la Cruz Band/"Hahabol-Habol" by Victor Wood

Episode hashtag

- #YFSFKGrandShowdown (Saturday)
- #YFSFKGrandWinner (Sunday)

Order	Contestant	Performance	Points			Rank
Order	Contestant	Performance	Stars	Votes	Total	Rank
1	Sheena Belarmino	Beyoncé – "Run the World (Girls)"	48.33%	9.97%	58.30%	Fourth Place
2	Chun-sa Jung	Rihanna – "Umbrella"	40.56%	1.03%	41.59%	Seventh Place
3	Krystal Brimner	Celine Dion – "It's All Coming Back to Me Now"	45.19%	2.93%	48.12%	Fifth Place
4	Marco Masa	Drake – "In My Feelings"	39.63%	1.60%	41.23%	Eighth Place
5	TNT Boys	Jessie J, Ariana Grande and Nicki Minaj – "Bang Bang"	50.00%	50.00%	100.00%	Winner
6	Esang de Torres	Barbra Streisand – "Don't Rain on My Parade"	47.22%	11.30%	58.52%	Third Place
7	Onyok Pineda	Steven Tyler of Aerosmith – "I Don't Want to Miss a Thing"	38.89%	28.70%	67.59%	Second Place
8	Noel Comia Jr.	Mick Jagger of The Rolling Stones – "(I Can't Get No) Satisfaction"	40.37%	2.17%	42.54%	Sixth Place

Notes

1. The total points are 50% final total stars and 50% audience vote.
2. The highest final total stars shall be the basis of the percentage, in this case, the TNT Boys with 270 stars.
3. The highest audience vote shall be the basis of the percentage.

== All-Star Reunion Special (August 25 & 26) ==
The All-Star Reunion Special thanksgiving concert was held on August 20 at the UP Theater, The All-Star Reunion Special was held with various non-competitional performances, and the thanksgiving concert was broadcast on the weekend after the Grand Showdown. This was hosted by Billy Crawford and Awra Briguela.

Additional performance

- YFSF All-Star Reunion - "Feel This Moment" by Pitbull featuring Christina Aguilera

Episode hashtag

- #YFSFAllStarReunion (Saturday)
- #YFSFFinalTransformation (Sunday)

Performances
Order	Performers	Performance	Guests
Part 1 (Saturday)
1	TNT Boys	Earth, Wind & Fire – "September" / "Let's Groove" / "Boogie Wonderland"	Melai Cantiveros, Karla Estrada, and Jolina Magdangal (Season 1 performers)
2	Krystal Brimner and Jay R	Nat King Cole and Natalie Cole – "Unforgettable"	Eric Nicolas (Season 2 performer)
3	Sheena Belarmino and Michael Pangilinan	Pink and Nate Ruess – "Just Give Me a Reason"	Jed Madela (celebrity mentor and juror)
4	Marco Masa and Sam Concepcion	Gary Valenciano – "Eto na Naman" / "Hataw Na" / "Di Bale na Lang"	Gary Valenciano (juror)
5	Noel Comia Jr. and Elha Nympha	Lionel Richie and Diana Ross – "Endless Love"	Myrtle Sarrosa and Kakai Bautista (Season 2 performers)
Part 2 (Sunday)
1	Chun-sa Jung and AC Bonifacio	Beyoncé and Lady Gaga – "Telephone"	Justin Alva and Alonzo Muhlach (Kids Season 1 performers)
2	Onyok Pineda and Xia Vigor	Hotdog – "Beh Buti Nga"	Sam Shoaf and Lyca Gairanod (Kids Season 1 performers)
3	Esang de Torres and Nyoy Volante	Freddie Mercury of Queen – "I Want to Break Free" / "We Will Rock You" / "We Are the Champions"	Sharon Cuneta (juror)

== Television ratings ==
Television ratings for the second season of Your Face Sounds Familiar Kids on ABS-CBN are gathered from Kantar Media. Kantar Media uses a nationwide panel size of 2,610 urban and rural homes that represent 100% of total Philippine TV viewing population. It is a multinational market research group that specializes in audience measurement in more than 80 countries.

Color keys
Highest rating during the season
Lowest rating during the season

Episode		Original air date	Timeslot (PST)	Rating	Rank		Source
Episode		Original air date	Timeslot (PST)	Rating	Timeslot	Primetime	Source
1	"Week 1 Premiere – part 1"	May 5, 2018	Saturday, 7:30 p.m.	31.1%	1	1	
2	"Week 1 Premiere – part 2"	May 6, 2018	Sunday, 7:30 p.m.	33.9%	1	1	
3	"Week 2 – part 1"	May 12, 2018	Saturday, 7:30 p.m.	30.2%	1	1	
4	"Week 2 – part 2"	May 13, 2018	Sunday, 7:30 p.m.	31.2%	1	1	
5	"Week 3 – part 1"	May 19, 2018	Saturday, 7:30 p.m.	31.6%	1	1	
6	"Week 3 – part 2"	May 20, 2018	Sunday, 7:30 p.m.	34.6%	1	1	
7	"Week 4 – part 1"	May 26, 2018	Saturday, 7:30 p.m.	32.0%	1	1	
8	"Week 4 – part 2"	May 27, 2018	Sunday, 7:30 p.m.	32.2%	1	1	
9	"Week 5 – part 1"	June 2, 2018	Saturday, 7:30 p.m.	32.8%	1	1	
10	"Week 5 – part 2"	June 3, 2018	Sunday, 7:30 p.m.	35.2%	1	1	
11	"Week 6 – part 1"	June 9, 2018	Saturday, 7:30 p.m.	34.4%	1	1	
12	"Week 6 – part 2"	June 10, 2018	Sunday, 7:30 p.m.	35.9%	1	1	
13	"Week 7 – part 1"	June 16, 2018	Saturday, 7:30 p.m.	31.5%	1	1	
14	"Week 7 – part 2"	June 17, 2018	Sunday, 7:30 p.m.	32.6%	1	1	
15	"Week 8 – part 1"	June 23, 2018	Saturday, 7:30 p.m.	34.1%	1	1	
16	"Week 8 – part 2"	June 24, 2018	Sunday, 7:30 p.m.	34.4%	1	1	
17	"Week 9 – part 1"	June 30, 2018	Saturday, 7:30 p.m.	31.3%	1	1	
18	"Week 9 – part 2"	July 1, 2018	Sunday, 7:30 p.m.	33.7%	1	1	
19	"Week 10 – part 1"	July 7, 2018	Saturday, 7:30 p.m.	32.2%	1	1	
20	"Week 10 – part 2"	July 8, 2018	Sunday, 7:30 p.m.	34.1%	1	1	
21	"Week 11 – part 1"	July 14, 2018	Saturday, 7:30 p.m.	33.4%	1	1	
22	"Week 11 – part 2"	July 15, 2018	Sunday, 7:30 p.m.	32.4%	1	1	
23	"Week 12 – part 1"	July 21, 2018	Saturday, 7:30 p.m.	32.3%	1	1	
24	"Week 12 – part 2"	July 22, 2018	Sunday, 7:30 p.m.	32%	1	1	
25	"Week 13 – part 1"	July 28, 2018	Saturday, 7:30 p.m.	34.0%	1	1	
26	"Week 13 – part 2"	July 29, 2018	Sunday, 7:30 p.m.	31.3%	1	1	
Season average				34.0%	36.8%	33.7%	
