= TNT Boys =

Filipino boy band

- Origin: Manila, Philippines
- Genres: Pop; OPM; teen pop; bubblegum pop
- Years active: 2017–present
- Label: TNT Records (Star Music)
- Members: Keifer Sanchez; Mackie Empuerto; Francis Concepcion
- Website: thetntboys.net

The TNT Boys (also known as The Big Shot Trio or Tawag ng Tanghalan Boys) is a Filipino boy band made up of three of the pre-to-early teen finalists of the 2017 television competition Tawag ng Tanghalan Kids. The members are Keifer Sanchez, Mackie Empuerto, and Francis Concepcion. In 2018, TNT Boys won as the grand winner in the second season of Your Face Sounds Familiar Kids. TNT Boys are the first Filipino act to perform in the four franchises of the talent show Little Big Shots in the Philippines, United States, United Kingdom and Australia.

== History ==
=== 2017: Formation from Tawag ng Tanghalan Kids ===
On June 10, 2017, the Tawag ng Tanghalan Kids (TNT Kids) grand finals was held at ABS-CBN Studio 3. Jhon Clyd Talili emerged as the grand champion, while Keifer Sanchez was on the 2nd place, Mackie Empuerto on the 3rd place, Sheena Belarmino on the fourth spot and Francis Concepcion in fifth. Vice Ganda was instrumental in forming the trio when the boys guested on his show Gandang Gabi Vice just after the grand finals. Vice asked them to have a singing battle with Beyoncé's "Listen". The boys' performance in Gandang Gabi Vice was critically applauded and went viral on social media, with reaction videos from netizens praising their singing ability. There and then, Vice launched the kids as the TNT Boys.

=== 2018: Talent show visits ===
In April 2018, the TNT Boys appeared on the Little Big Shots US to sing Beyonce's "Listen". The episode prompted Ellen DeGeneres to tweet Beyonce: "Beyoncé, I hope you watch Sunday’s episode of #LittleBigShots." And just a day after, Little Big Shots released a clip of the performance online. Brian May, one of the members of the British rock band Queen, shared the video on his verified Facebook page, saying "Check out these lovely young lads from the Philippines. Brilliant. Great to see youngsters relating to Queen so well — and enjoying"

The group also appeared on the other franchises of Little Big Shots, including Little Big Shots UK and Australia.

In May 2018, TNT Boys participated in the second season of Your Face Sounds Familiar Kids. During the first week of the show, the TNT Boys impersonated the Bee Gees, again receiving critical applause and attracted the attention of the group who tweeted:"Imitation truly is the sincerest from of flattery! Thank you #TNTBoys @YourFacePH for your rendition of "Too Much Heaven". #MyBeeGees," Other notable renditions and impersonations include songs from APO Hiking Society, Salbakuta, Destiny's Child, Mercy Sunot, Juliet Sunot, Rey Abenoja of Aegis, The Supremes, Hagibis, Mariah Carey and Boyz II Men, Spice Girls, VST & Company, The Three Tenors, DoReMi (Donna Cruz, Regine Velasquez, and Mikee Cojuangco), Wonder Girls, ABBA (with Sam Shoaf). After 16 weeks of performances and their grand finals impersonation of Jessie J, Ariana Grande and Nicki Minaj's "Bang Bang", they emerged as the grand winner of the second season, garnering 100% of the judges' and public votes held at UP Theater on August 19, 2018.

On October 14, 2018, the TNT Boys performed at Singaporean President Halimah Yacob's Star Charity (PSC) event in Singapore over the weekend. The three dapper young boys emerged on stage wearing matching maroon suits and treated the attendees of the charity ball to their rendition of Whitney Houston’s "The Greatest Love of All" and Beyoncé's "Listen". After their performance, President Yacob herself went backstage to personally meet and take photos with the boys.

On November 14, 2018, the boys received the Royal Cub Award at the Rawr Awards 2018 from the entertainment blog, LionhearTV. The Royal Cub Award is given to young individuals who possess incredible talent recognized globally by consistently making headlines and trending performances. On November 18, they became a regular performer on ASAP after the show reformatted into ASAP Natin 'To. They received a Rising Pop Child Performer of the Year Award at the PPOP Awards for Young Artists 2018.

On November 30, 2018, TNT Boys broke the record as the country's youngest sold outperformers on their first major concert entitled 'Listen: The Big Shot Concert' at the Araneta Coliseum. Their guests included Jed Madela, Vice Ganda, K Brosas, Janine Berdin, Noven Belleza, Jhon Clyd Talili, and the Your Face Sounds Familiar Kids from season 1 and 2.

=== 2019: World tour, more talent shows, and "Starla" theme song ===
In the series' premiere episode on February 3, 2019, the TNT Boys appeared as contestants on the U.S. reality talent competition The World's Best. During the audition rounds, they garnered a total of 99/100 points from the American and international judges. In the battle rounds, they got a total score of 97. They lost to Naturally 7 in the championship rounds for the group variety category.

The TNT Boys will begin their world tour featuring Angelica Hale for the North American dates in April 2019.

In October 2019, the group performed the official theme song for the fantasy drama series Starla, entitled "Ako ang Iyong Bituin".

== Members ==
- Keifer Sanchez, born November 25, 2004 (age 21) in Davao City, Philippines
- Mackie Empuerto, born September 8, 2005 (age 21) in Manila, Philippines
- Francis Concepcion, born June 22, 2006 (age 20) in Zamboanga, Philippines

== Concerts ==
Date	Title	Venue	Country	Description	Ref.
July 13, 2018	AEGIS 20BLE Dekada	Smart Araneta Coliseum	Philippines	Guest performers	
July 28, 2018	TNT All Star Showdown	Smart Araneta Coliseum	Philippines	with fellow TNT artists	
September 21, 2018	TNT All Star Showdown Cebu	Hoops Dome, Lapu-lapu City	Philippines	with fellow TNT artists	
September 28, 2018	Pinoy Hype 2018	Al Nasr Leisureland	United Arab Emirates	with Janine Berdin, BoybandPH	
November 16, 2018	Jed Madela XV HIGHER THAN HIGH: The 15th Anniversary Concert	Smart Araneta Coliseum	Philippines	Guest performers	
November 30, 2018	Listen : The Big Shot Concert	Smart Araneta Coliseum	Philippines	Solo concert	
February 16, 2019	TNT Boys: A Post-Valentine Special	Thunderbird Resorts and Casinos Rizal	Philippines	Solo concert	
February 23, 2019	TNT Boys: A Post-Valentine Special	Thunderbird Resorts and Casinos La Union	Philippines	Solo concert	
April 25, 2019	TNT Boys Listen: The World Tour	Theater at Ace Hotel, Los Angeles	United States	Solo concert	
April 27, 2019	TNT Boys Listen: The World Tour	Edmonton Expo Center, Alberta	Canada	Solo concert	
May 2, 2019	TNT Boys Listen: The World Tour	Chabot College Hayward, California	United States	Solo concert	
August 3, 2019	ASAP Natin 'To Bay Area	S.A.P Center, San Jose, California	United States	with other Filipino Artists	
November 16, 2019	ASAP Natin 'To Rome	Palazzo Dello Sport, Rome	Italy	with other Filipino Artists	
December 13, 2019	Filipino Night OA sa Riyadh	Riyadh Boulevard, Riyadh	Saudi Arabia	Guest performers	
December 31, 2019	The Grand Countdown to 2020	Resorts World, Manila	Philippines	Collaboration with Gary Valenciano	

== Awards ==
Year	Award	Category	Result	Ref.
2018	Rawr Awards	Royal Cub Awardee	Won	
2018	PPOP Young Artists Awards	Rising Pop Child Performer of the Year	Won	
2019	Wish Music Awards: Breaking Boundaries	Breaking Boundaries Award	Won	
2019	Push Awards	Push Newcomer of the Year	Nominated	
2019	Push Awards	Push Music Performance of the Year "TNT Boys as Bee Gees - Too Much Heaven"	Won	
2019	50th Guillermo Mendoza Box Office Entertainment Awards	Promising Male Concert Performers of the Year	Won	
2019	National Customers' Choice Annual Awards	Concert Performer of the Year	Won	
2019	National Customers' Choice Annual Awards	Concert of the Year -Listen: The Bigshot Concert	Won	
2019	Golden Laurel Media Awards	Breakthrough Music Artist of the Year	Won	
2019	Aral Parangal	Music Artist of the Year	Won	
2019	Best Choice Achievement Awards	Concert Performer of the Year	Won	
2019	Awit Awards	Favorite Group Artists	Won	
2019	Awit Awards	Favorite New Group Artists	Won	
2019	Alta Media Icon Awards	Best Child Performers for TV	Won	
2020	11th PMPC Star Awards for Music	Group Artist of the Year	Won	

Preceded by Awra Briguela	Your Face Sounds Familiar (Philippine TV series); Winner; 2018	Succeeded by Klarisse de Guzman
Preceded by Awra Briguela	Your Face Sounds Familiar Kids (Philippine TV series) Kids Season; Winner; May 2018–August 2018	Succeeded by Incumbent
