= List of Starla episodes =

Starla is a 2019 Philippine drama television series starring Joel Torre, Jana Agoncillo, Enzo Pelojero, Judy Ann Santos, Meryll Soriano, Joem Bascon, and Raymart Santiago. The series premiered on ABS-CBN's Primetime Bida evening block and worldwide via The Filipino Channel from October 7, 2019 to January 10, 2020, replacing The General's Daughter.

== Series overview ==
| Season | Episodes | Originally released | |
| Season | Episodes | First released | Last released |
|---|---|---|---|
| 1 | 70 | October 7, 2019 | January 10, 2020 |

== Episodes ==
=== Season 1 ===
| No. overall | No. in season | Title | Original release date | Kantar Media Ratings (nationwide) |
|---|---|---|---|---|
| 1 | 1 | "Starry Night" | October 7, 2019 | 29.2% |
| 2 | 2 | "First Wish" | October 8, 2019 | 29.2% |
| 3 | 3 | "Ampon" | October 9, 2019 | 29.2% |
| 4 | 4 | "Sabotahe" | October 10, 2019 | 29.8% |
| 5 | 5 | "Galit" | October 11, 2019 | 27.7% |
| 6 | 6 | "Teresa is Home" | October 14, 2019 | 28.9% |
| 7 | 7 | "Pagtulong" | October 15, 2019 | 27.6% |
| 8 | 8 | "Liwanag" | October 16, 2019 | 27.6% |
| 9 | 9 | "Back To School" | October 17, 2019 | 27.3% |
| 10 | 10 | "Starla at Kalabaw" | October 18, 2019 | 28.8% |
| 11 | 11 | "Himala" | October 21, 2019 | 28.9% |
| 12 | 12 | "Anak" | October 22, 2019 | 27.2% |
| 13 | 13 | "Childhood Memories" | October 23, 2019 | 27.2% |
| 14 | 14 | "Starnap" | October 24, 2019 | 29.4% |
| 15 | 15 | "Finding Starla" | October 25, 2019 | 28.1% |
| 16 | 16 | "Alkansya" | October 28, 2019 | 27.2% |
| 17 | 17 | "Suman ni Buboy" | October 29, 2019 | 27.3% |
| 18 | 18 | "Caroling" | October 30, 2019 | 27.5% |
| 19 | 19 | "Starla at Kuto" | October 31, 2019 | 26.1% |
| 20 | 20 | "Libing" | November 1, 2019 | 25.4% |
| 21 | 21 | "Starla for Ransom" | November 4, 2019 | 29.2% |
| 22 | 22 | "Solar Light Bulb" | November 5, 2019 | 28.0% |
| 23 | 23 | "Home Alone" | November 6, 2019 | 27.1% |
| 24 | 24 | "Beyonce" | November 7, 2019 | 27.2% |
| 25 | 25 | "Starla at Sunflower" | November 8, 2019 | 26.8% |
| 26 | 26 | "Starla at Saranggola" | November 11, 2019 | 26.8% |
| 27 | 27 | "Two Fathers" | November 12, 2019 | 25.3% |
| 28 | 28 | "Pag-asa" | November 13, 2019 | 25.5% |
| 29 | 29 | "Playtime" | November 14, 2019 | 26.2% |
| 30 | 30 | "Madilim na Gubat" | November 15, 2019 | 28.7% |
| 31 | 31 | "The Search" | November 18, 2019 | 30.9% |
| 32 | 32 | "Himala ng Liwanag" | November 19, 2019 | 28.7% |
| 33 | 33 | "Bad Wishes" | November 20, 2019 | 25.7% |
| 34 | 34 | "Greggy vs. Robert" | November 21, 2019 | 27.5% |
| 35 | 35 | "Magic Fertilizer" | November 22, 2019 | 27.8% |
| 36 | 36 | "Friendship Over" | November 25, 2019 | 27.2% |
| 37 | 37 | "Goodbye Starla, Hello Stella" | November 26, 2019 | 30.4% |
| 38 | 38 | "Foreigner in Barrio Maulap" | November 27, 2019 | 26.3% |
| 39 | 39 | "Stella Now Na" | November 28, 2019 | 27.5% |
| 40 | 40 | "May Kuryente Na" | November 29, 2019 | 27.1% |
| 41 | 41 | "Teresa's Wishes Granted" | December 2, 2019 | 24.0% |
| 42 | 42 | "Kawawang Manok" | December 3, 2019 | 22.4% |
| 43 | 43 | "Epidemya" | December 4, 2019 | 23.5% |
| 44 | 44 | "Philip Sacrifice" | December 5, 2019 | 25.5% |
| 45 | 45 | "Change of Heart" | December 6, 2019 | 23.8% |
| 46 | 46 | "Teresa vs. Robert" | December 9, 2019 | 25.5% |
| 47 | 47 | "Demolition" | December 10, 2019 | 25.1% |
| 48 | 48 | "Who Killed Robert" | December 11, 2019 | 25.2% |
| 49 | 49 | "Attorney in Prison" | December 12, 2019 | 26.6% |
| 50 | 50 | "Trial of Teresa" | December 13, 2019 | 24.8% |
| 51 | 51 | "Nabuko sa Buko" | December 16, 2019 | 27.0% |
| 52 | 52 | "Bulldozer ni Dexter" | December 17, 2019 | 26.6% |
| 53 | 53 | "Teresa is Free" | December 18, 2019 | 25.5% |
| 54 | 54 | "Forgiveness" | December 19, 2019 | 24.9% |
| 55 | 55 | "One Big Happy Family" | December 20, 2019 | 24.5% |
| 56 | 56 | "Dark Secrets" | December 23, 2019 | 23.8% |
| 57 | 57 | "Buboy's Pain" | December 24, 2019 | 21.4% |
| 58 | 58 | "Runaway Buboy" | December 25, 2019 | 20.2% |
| 59 | 59 | "Mananatili Ka Sa Puso Ko" | December 26, 2019 | 25.3% |
| 60 | 60 | "Teresa's Confession" | December 27, 2019 | 24.9% |
| 61 | 61 | "Wishing Spree" | December 30, 2019 | 24.6% |
| 62 | 62 | "Guilt" | December 31, 2019 | 21.0% |
| 63 | 63 | "Dexter Strikes Back" | January 1, 2020 | 22.1% |
| 64 | 64 | "Secret Revealed" | January 2, 2020 | 26.2% |
| 65 | 65 | "No More Miracles" | January 3, 2020 | 27.6% |
| 66 | 66 | "Last 5 Starry Nights" | January 6, 2020 | 25.3% |
| 67 | 67 | "Last 4 Starry Nights" | January 7, 2020 | 26.4% |
| 68 | 68 | "Last 3 Starry Nights" | January 8, 2020 | 29.3% |
| 69 | 69 | "Last 2 Starry Nights" | January 9, 2020 | 30.6% |
| 70 | 70 | "Ang Huling Hiling" | January 10, 2020 | 29.3% |
