= Swap (film) =

Philippine crime drama film

- Directed by: Remton Siega Zuasola
- Written by: Remton Siega Zuasola
- Produced by: Bianca Balbuena
- Starring: Dionne Monsanto; Matt Daclan; Mon Confiado; RK Bagatsing; Jess Mendoza; Ligaya Rabago
- Cinematography: Ruel Dahis Antipuesto
- Edited by: Keith Deligero
- Music by: Bryan Dumaguina
- Production companies: Center Stage Productions; Above the Line Productions; 8thumbs; Epicmedia
- Distributed by: Solar Pictures
- Release date: March 18, 2015
- Running time: 96 minutes
- Country: Philippines
- Languages: Filipino; Cebuano

Swap is a 2015 Philippine crime drama film written and directed by Remton Siega Zuasola. The film stars Dionne Monsanto, Matt Daclan, Mon Confiado, RK Bagatsing, Jess Mendoza and Ligaya Rabago. It was one of the entries in the 2015 Sinag Maynila Film Festival.

The film is streaming online on YouTube.

== Cast ==
- Dionne Monsanto as Insiang
- Matt Daclan as Tonyo
- Mon Confiado as Agent Sanchez
- RK Bagatsing as Agent Ramirez
- Jess Mendoza as Agent Diaz
- Paul Kiener as Forensic Expert
- Clanch Belleza as Agent
- Ruther Villalba as Agent
- Ligaya Rabago as Tiling
- Pancrasio Mondigo Jr. as Mr. Sy
- Publio Briones III as Mastermind
- Chai Fonacier as Malou
- Genica Mijares as Sarah

== Reception ==
Ren Aguila of GMA News gave Swap a positive review, stating that the film "knows when to relieve tension". He praised Zuasola for mastering the one-take technique and the "perfect balance of the visual, the symbolic, and the expository" seen in the performances of the main characters.

Jay Cruz of SineGang gave Swap 3.5 out of 5 stars, dismissing the film as mediocre. He praised the performances of the characters and the film's production design, but panned the story for being squeezed "between this obligation to display such details" and the need to express the main narrative at hand".

After being part of the 2015 Sinag Maynila Film Festival, it was later on featured in the 63rd San Sebastián International Film Festival (Spain), 2nd Silk Road International Film Festival (China), 16th Tokyo Filmex (Japan) and 10th Jogja-NETPAC Asian Film Festival (Indonesia).

== Awards ==
| Year | Awards | Category | Recipient | Result | Ref. |
|---|---|---|---|---|---|
| 2015 | Sinag Maynila Film Festival | Best Picture | Swap | Nominated | |
