= Mercy Sunot =

Filipino singer (1976–2024)

- Born: Mercy Sunot; November 6, 1976; Cagayan de Oro, Philippines
- Died: November 18, 2024 (aged 48) San Francisco, California, U.S.
- Genres: Rock; pop-rock; OPM
- Occupation: Singer
- Instrument: Vocals
- Years active: 1995–2024
- Labels: Alpha Music Corporation; Star Music
- Formerly of: Aegis

Mercy Sunot (November 6, 1976 — November 18, 2024) was a Filipino singer and member of the pop rock band Aegis.

Along with her sisters Juliet and Ken, they became widely recognized for their powerful belting vocals, which complemented the band's emotionally expressive lyrics. The band achieved mainstream success with several hit songs, including "Luha" ("Tears"), "Basang-basa sa Ulan" ("Drenched in Rain"), "Halik" ("Kiss"), and "Sinta" ("Beloved").

== Biography ==
=== Early life and career ===
Mercy Sunot was born and raised in Cagayan de Oro, where she grew up in a family of eight siblings, including her sisters Juliet and Ken, who were also part of the band. Her passion and talent for singing were inherited from her mother.

In 1995, Aegis was formed with herself and her sisters Juliet and Ken (added in 2011) on lead vocals, Rey Abenoja on vocals and guitar, Stella Pabico on keyboards, Rowena Adriano on bass guitar, and Vilma Goloviogo on drums. Along with her bandmates, they initially performed under the name AG's Soundtrippers, a name derived from their manager's initials. In 1998, their manager renamed the group to Aegis following their signing with Alpha Records. Upon returning to the Philippines, the band began recording their debut album, Halik, which would later become a defining success in their career.

=== Death ===
On November 18, 2024, Sunot died at the age of 48 at the Stanford Hospital and Clinics in San Francisco, California after a battle with breast and lung cancer.

In the days leading up to her death, Sunot shared her health struggles. She posted a video, asking for prayers for her recovery. In the video, she revealed that she had undergone surgery to remove fluid from her lungs and was admitted to the intensive care unit (ICU) due to breathing difficulties.

== Discography ==
=== With Aegis ===
Year	Album	Label
1998	Halik (quadruple platinum)	Alpha Music
1999	Mahal na Mahal Kita (double platinum)	Alpha Music
2000	Paskung-Pasko	Alpha Music
2001	Awit at Pag-ibig	Alpha Music
2002	Ating Balikan	Alpha Music
2003	Muling Balikan	Alpha Music
2006	Aegis: Greatest Hits	Alpha Music
2009	Back to Love	Alpha Music
2012	Mga Himig ng Pag-Asa	Alpha Music
2014	Aegis: Greatest Hits, Vol. 2	Alpha Music
2018	AEGIS 20 & Beyond: Sa Ikalawang Dekada ng Musika Natin	Alpha Music

== Personal life ==
She has two children from her previous relationships: Mary Mitzi Jim Sunot and Mark Joseph Sunot Borjal.

== In popular culture ==
- In 2003 episode of Magpakailanman, SexBomb Girls member Jopay Paguia portrays Mercy and also Rochelle Pangilinan portrays her sister Juliet.
- In 2018 episode of 2nd Season of Your Face Sounds Familiar Kids, Keifer Sanchez of TNT Boys was impersonating Mercy while Mackie Empuerto as her sister Juliet and Francis Concepcion as Rey Abenoja.
