= Starla =

2019–20 Philippine television drama series

- Title card
- Genre: Drama; Fantasy
- Created by: Dindo C. Perez; Julie Anne R. Benitez
- Developed by: ABS-CBN Studios
- Written by: Cenon Palomares; Dindo C. Perez; Jann Kayla Mendoza; RJ Carbonel; Siege Ledesma
- Directed by: Onat A. Diaz; Darnel Joy R. Villaflor; Jerome C. Pobocan
- Starring: Jana Agoncillo; Enzo Pelojero; Joel Torre; Judy Ann Santos; Charo Santos; Meryll Soriano; Joem Bascon; Raymart Santiago
- Music by: Cesar Francis S. Concio
- Opening theme: "Ako ang Iyong Bituin" by TNT Boys
- Country of origin: Philippines
- Original language: Filipino
- No. of seasons: 1
- No. of episodes: 70 (list of episodes)

Production
- Executive producers: Carlo Katigbak; Cory Vidanes; Laurenti Dyogi; Roldeo T. Endrinal
- Producers: Marissa V. Kalaw; Julie Anne R. Benitez
- Running time: 27–39 minutes
- Production company: Dreamscape Entertainment

Original release
- Network: ABS-CBN
- Release: October 7, 2019 – January 10, 2020

Starla is a Philippine television drama fantasy series broadcast by ABS-CBN. Directed by Onat A. Diaz, Darnel Joy R. Villaflor and Jerome C. Pobocan, it stars Jana Agoncillo, Enzo Pelojero, Joel Torre, Judy Ann Santos, Meryll Soriano, Joem Bascon, and Raymart Santiago. It aired on the network's Primetime Bida line up and worldwide on TFC from October 7, 2019 to January 10, 2020, replacing The General’s Daughter and was replaced by Make It with You.

== Premise ==
Starla is a story about renewed hope, the warmth of home, love for the family, wishes that come true, and impeccable forgiveness. It revolves around Buboy, a boy who discovers a wayward wishing star named Starla and uses her to save his town.

== Cast and characters ==
=== Main cast ===
- Judy Ann Santos as Atty. Teresa "Tere" Dichavez-Manalo
  - Yesha Camille as young Teresa
  - Heaven Peralejo as teen Teresa
- Joel Torre as Gregorio "Mang Greggy" Dichavez
- Jana Agoncillo as Starla / Stella
- Enzo Pelojero as Buboy Dichavez
- Meryll Soriano as Ester Rivera
- Joem Bascon as Atty. Dexter Soliman
- Raymart Santiago as Dr. Philip Manalo
  - Brace Arquiza as teen Philip

=== Supporting cast ===
- Grae Fernandez as George Cultura
- Chantal Videla as Lena Batumbakal
- Bodjie Pascua as Kulas Trinidad
- Simon Ibarra as Kapitan Domingo "Domeng" Jacinto
  - Neil Coleta as teen Domeng
- Jerry O'Hara as Apol Magtulis
- Joel Saracho as Ambo Soberano
- Kathleen Hermosa as Frida Matias
- Janus del Prado as Boyong dela Cruz
- Jordan Herrera as Pedro Jaena
- Anna Luna as Lolita Batumbakal
- Dolly de Leon as Carmelita
- Marilen Cruz as Trining Manalo
- Matt Daclan as Javi Diaz
- Poppert Bernadas as Kanor Sanchez
- Jimmy Marquez as Sylvester Gil
- Alex Baena as Tonton Rivera
- Roanne Maligat as Jepoy Kho
- Dimple Magnaye as Astra
- Myel de Leon as Nova
- Raikko Mateo as Astro
- Chunsa Jeung as Celestia

=== Guest cast ===
- Tirso Cruz III as Atty. Robert Salazar
- Charo Santos-Concio as Lola Tala
- Ana Abad Santos as Lita Villarreal-Dichaves
- Mimi Marquez as Mimi
- Reign Hanzein Fraile Leyson as Esong

== Broadcast ==
Starla premiered on ABS-CBN on October 7, 2019.

=== Re-runs ===
Re-runs of Starla was aired on Yey! as weekend marathon from October 12, 2019 to January 11, 2020.

It also aired re-runs on Jeepney TV from May 16 to November 14, 2020; December 13, 2021 to February 4, 2022; March 3 to April 18, 2025 and November 16, 2026 to January 1, 2027.

On June 4, 2020, it was announced that the show also had a rerun on the Kapamilya Channel from June 15, 2020 to November 29, 2020, and was replaced by Pinoy Big Brother: Connect.

It also aired re-runs on ALLTV (simulcast with Jeepney TV) from March 3 to April 16, 2025.

== Reception ==
=== Ratings ===
Kantar Media National TV Ratings (8:30PM PST)
Pilot Episode	Finale Episode	Peak	Average
29.2% October 7, 2019	29.3% January 10, 2020	30.9% November 18, 2019	26.6%

=== Accolades ===
Year	Award	Category	Recipient	Result	Ref.
2019	Platinum Stallion Media Awards	Best Values Oriented Program	Starla	Won	

== See also ==
- List of programs broadcast by ABS-CBN
- List of programs broadcast by Jeepney TV
- List of ABS-CBN Studios original drama series
