= Sheena Belarmino =

Filipino singer and dancer (born 2005)

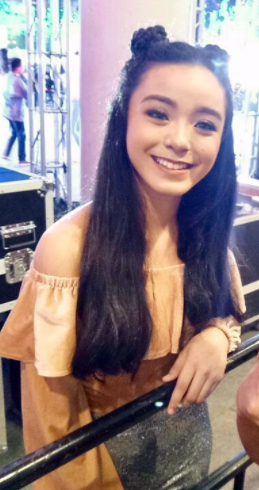
- Belarmino in 2019
- Born: Sheena Librel Belarmino; December 15, 2005 (age 20); Cebu City, Cebu, Philippines
- Education: University of Cebu
- Occupations: Singer; dancer; actress
- Years active: 2015–present
- Agent: Star Magic (2021–present)
- Known for: Dance Kids, Your Face Sounds Familiar Kids, Tawag ng Tanghalan Kids
- Height: 5 ft 4 in (163 cm)

Signature
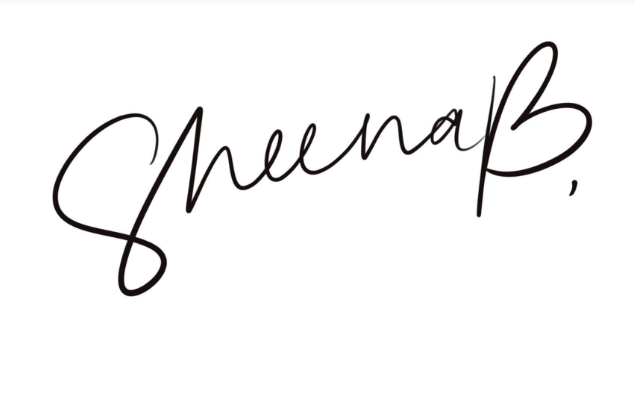

Sheena Librel Belarmino (born December 15, 2005) is a Filipino singer, dancer, and actress. She rose to prominence after becoming a grand finalist on Tawag ng Tanghalan Kids in 2017 alongside TNT boys. In 2015, she joined Dance Kids and made it into the quarter-finals. Belarmino also garnered a record of most wins (5 wins) on Your Face Sounds Familiar Kids Season 2 where she emerged as the 4th placer in the Grand Finals. Belarmino was a member of the all-female vocal group New Gen Divas along with Elha Nympha, Zephanie and Janine Berdin.

== Personal life ==
Belarmino was born on December 15, 2005, in Cebu City, Philippines. She started singing and dancing at the age of three. As the youngest of five siblings, her mother often describes her as timid at home but is confident on stage. She is also a star student and a high achiever at school. Belarmino went to University of Cebu.

== Career ==
=== Dance Kids ===
In 2015, Belarmino joined Dance Kids. At nine years old, she was one of the youngest contenders from the Visayas. She made it to the quarter-finals in which AC Bonifacio and Lucky Ancheta (collectively known as Lucky Aces) emerged as the winner of the said competition.

=== Tawag ng Tanghalan Kids ===
In 2017, Belarmino joined Tawag ng Tanghalan kids. She sang Rachel Platten's "Fight Song" in which she won as the daily winner.

She stunned the judges with her performance of Demi Lovato's "Stone Cold" garnered almost 5 million views on YouTube. She was hailed as the 4th placer and became the only female grand finalist against all other male contenders including the TNT Boys in which John Clyde Talili emerged as the winner.

In 2024, TNT Kids returned for its 2nd season. Belarmino became a hurado (judge) and the first TNT alumni to do this.

=== Your Face Sounds Familiar Kids: Season 2 ===
In 2018, Belarmino joined Your Face Sounds Familiar Kids Season 2. The show lasted for 15 weeks. In the pilot episode, She impersonated the Popstar Royalty Sarah Geronimo and performed "Tala" which bagged her the first win. The performance became viral with 9.8 million+ views on YouTube.

Belarmino also impersonated Darren Espanto, Whitney Houston, Chris Brown, Jennifer Lopez, Nicki Minaj, Regine Velasquez, Ariana Grande, Jessa Zaragoza, Sharon Cuneta, Olivia Newton-John, Donna Summer, Alanis Morissette, Miley Cyrus and Ariana Grande (together with AC Bonifacio), and Beyoncé.

Her performance as KZ Tandingan earned her a top trending spot on YouTube. Belarmino has five wins in total, the most wins in the entire YFSF run.

=== ASAP Natin ‘To ===
Belarmino was previously part of a Sing and Dance girl group called Just A.S.K., together with AC Bonifacio and Krystal Brimner. The trio initially performed on Gandang Gabi, Vice! with fans asking the network to debut them as an official girl group. The Trio also had the chance to perform with their Idol, Sarah Geronimo on ASAP Natin ‘To The trio would debut as a group on March 1, 2020, until the COVID-19 pandemic kicked in, resulting in restrictions that would keep the group's stint short-lived.

At the age of 15, Belarmino is the youngest regular performer on the show. In April 2021, ASAP formed a singing group called the New Gen Divas, in which Belarmino is a member along with Zephanie (later replaced by Fatima Lagueras aka Fana following her transfer to GMA Network in 2022), Elha Nympha, and Janine Berdin, with Sheena representing the color yellow in the group.

=== Star Magic ===
Belarmino signed a contract with Star Magic along with several other stars during the ABS CBN's Black Pen Day on June 19, 2021.

=== Showtime Online Ü ===
In 2024, Belarmino was added as one of the hosts of the online counterpart of the television variety show It's Showtime, titled Showtime Online Ü alongside Wize Estabillo.

Theatre

Growing up in Cebu City, she got to work with various local theatre productions as a kid. However, her love for theatre was set aside when she started her career in showbiz after TNT Kids.

When Starmagic and Teatro Kapamilya announced the re-staging of the cut-short Tabing-Ilog the Musical due to the COVID-19 restrictions in 2020, Belarmino was one of the auditionees alongside many Starmagic artists. Tabing-ilog the Musical is based on the late 90s hit teen show of the same title that saw the rise of actors like John Lloyd Cruz, Kay Abad, Paolo Contis, Baron Geisler, and Desiree Del valle to name a few. Tabing-ilog the musical is a collaboration between Starmagic's Teatro Kapamilya and Philippine Educational Theater Association (PETA). Through a series of auditions and callbacks, Belarmino got the role of Eds delos Santos, originally played in the TV series by Kaye Abad, and she alternated with co-Starmagic artists Vivoree and Jhoanna Robles of the girl group BINI. The musical ran for 29 shows from November 10 to December 17, 2023. A year later, the musical had a re-run from November 8 to December 1, 2024, with the majority of the cast returning and a few additional actors; both runs were directed by Phil Noble.

In 2024, she landed the role of Tricia for the PETA's adaptation of John Lloyd Cruz and Bea Alonzo's hit romcom movie One More Chance. The musical used the songs from the band, Ben & Ben to navigate the love and heartbreak of Popoy, Basha, and the Thursday Barkada. The musical had a back-to-back run from April to June, and from August to October, with 130+ shows.

Belarmino performed "Langhiyang Pag-ibig, " showing Tricia's angsty personality and "Kathang-isip" as her break-up exit from Popoy. Her portrayal earned her positive reviews from audiences and critics and landed her a nomination for Best Featured Female Artist in a Musical at the 15th Gawad Buhay Awards 2025. She also previously won the 2024 Broadway World Philippines Award for Best Featured Artist in a Musical.

In February 2025, Belarmino played the role of Natalie Goodman on Sandbox Collective's staging of the Pulitzer-Prize winning and Tony Award-winning musical Next to Normal.

The last quarter of 2025, she will cap off her theatre schedule with Barefoot Theatre Collaborative's Barboys the Musical as part of the student-lawyers in the ensemble.

== Discography ==
Year	Song	Album	Composer		Label
2018	Dalawang Pag-ibig Nya	Himig Handog 2018	Bernard Reforsado	With Krystal Brimner and MNL48	Star Music
2022	My Destiny	Lyric and Beat, Vol. 4	Jonathan Manalo & Sabine Cerrado		Star Music
2022	Lyric and Beat	Lyric and Beat, vol. 1	Jeremy Eriq Glinoga, Jonathan Manalo, Anna Graham	With Lyric and Beat cast (Darren Espanto, AC Bonifacio, Angela Ken, Jeremy G, Seth Fedelin, Andrea Brillantes, Kyle Echarri, and Awra Brigela)	Star Music
2022	Pangarap Kong Pangarap Mo	Lyric and Beat, vol. 1	Jonathan Manalo	with Darren Espanto	Star Music
2022	Power of the Dream	Lyric and Beat, vol. 2	Jonathan Manalo	with Darren Espanto	Star Music
2022	Bakit Lumuluha	Lyric and Beat, vol. 4	Jonathan Manalo	with Darren Espanto and Andrea Brillantes	Star Music
2022	Sa Isang Pangarap	Lyric and Beat, vol. 4	Jonathan Manalo	with Andrea Brillantes	Star Music
2022	What U Want	Lyric and Beat, vol. 4	Jonathan Manalo	Main Artist: Kyle Echarri	Star Music
2022	Kabataang Pinoy	Lyric and Beat, vol. 1	Jonathan Manalo	With Lyric and Beat cast (AC Bonifacio, Angela Ken, Jeremy G, Seth Fedelin, Andrea Brillantes)	Star Music
2022	Tara Tena	Lyric and Beat, vol 4	Jonathan Manalo	With Lyric and Beat cast (Darren Espanto, AC Bonifacio, Angela Ken, Jeremy G, Seth Fedelin, Andrea Brillantes, Kyle Echarri, and Awra Brigela)	Star Music

- on the 38th Cebu Popular Music Festival in Cebu City she sang the song :SUGBUANON AKO", PLEASE SUBSCRIBE!38th Cebu Pop GRAND CHAMPION (Garbo sa Bisdak)
  - words and music by JAY-ARR F. LIBRANDO
  - Arranged by NENDEL ENDRINA
  - Interpreted by SHEENNA BELARMINO
  - courtesy of Cebu Arts Foundation Inc.
- Atty. Eduardo R. Gullas
  - Chairman/Father of Cebu Pop
  - Recorded at NENDEL RECORDING STUDIO
  - Mastered at SOUNDTRAXX production studio

== Filmography ==
=== Television / Digital ===
Year	Title	Role	Ref.
2015	Dance Kids	Contestant	
2017	Tawag ng Tanghalan Kids	Contestant	
2018	Your Face Sounds Familiar Kids: Season 2	Contestant	
2018	Gandang Gabi, Vice!	Guest	
2018–2024	ASAP Natin ‘To	Performer (Member of New Gen Divas)	
2022	Lyric and Beat	Melissa	
2022	Magandang Buhay	Guest	
2022	The Squad 22	Member	
2023	Papa ng Masa	Host	
2024	TNT Kids Season 2	Hurado	
2024–Present	Showtime Online Ü	Host	

== Awards and nominations ==
Year	Award	Category	Notable Work	Result	Ref
2018	Push Awards	Push Dance Performance of the Year	Your Face Sounds Familiar Kids 2018: Sheena Belarmino as Sarah Geronimo | Tala	Nominated	
2019	National Customers' Choice Annual Awards	Breakthrough Child Performer in Singing Category		Won	
2024	Broadway World Philippines Awards	Best Supporting Performer in a Musical	Role of Tricia in PETA's One More Chance The Musical	Won	
