= Matt Daclan =

Cebuano actor

- Born: Mark Anthony Comendador Daclan
- Occupation: Actor

Matt Daclan is a Cebuano actor.

== Career ==
In 2014, Daclan appeared in the Cinema One Originals Digital Film Festival entry Soap Opera and won the Best Actor award.

== Filmography ==
=== Television ===
Year	Title	Role	Notes	Source
2017	Brillante Mendoza Presents	Manny	Episode: "Kadaugan"	
2019	Starla	Javi Diaz		

=== Film ===
Year	Title	Role	Notes	Source
2014	Soap Opera			
2015	Swap			
2016	A Lullaby to the Sorrowful Mystery	Andres Bonifacio		
2016	Hiblang Abo			
2017	Those Long-Haired Nights			
2018	Goyo: The Boy General	Daclan		
2019	The Annulment			

== Awards and nominations ==
Year	Work	Award	Category	Result	Source
2014	Soap Opera	Cinema One Originals Film Festival	Best actor	Won	
2017	Those Long-Haired Nights	Young Critics Circle	Best Performance by Male or Female, Adult or Child, Individual or Ensemble in Leading or Supporting Role	Nominated	
