= Jed Madela =

Filipino singer

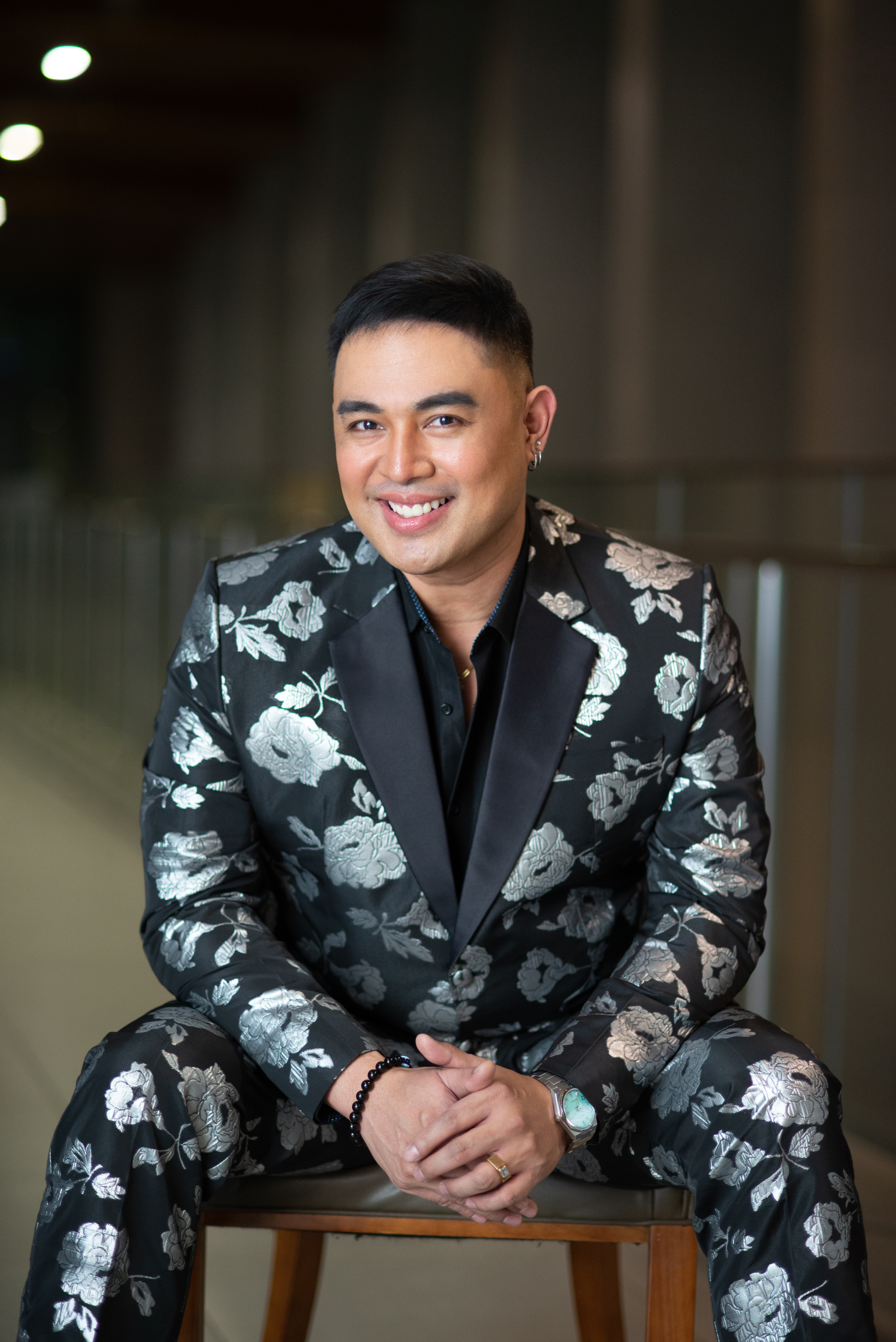
- Jed Madela in 2024

Background information
- Also known as: The Voice, The Singer's Singer
- Born: John Edward Tiña Tajanlangit; July 14, 1977 (age 49); Iloilo City, Iloilo, Philippines
- Genres: OPM, pop
- Occupations: Singer-songwriter, television presenter, actor
- Years active: 2001–present
- Labels: Universal Records (2003–2012); Star Music (2012–2019); Madd Creatives (2019–present)

John Edward Tiña Tajanlangit (born July 14, 1977), professionally known as Jed Madela, is a Filipino singer, songwriter, TV host, entertainer and occasional actor. He was the first Filipino to win the World Championships of Performing Arts title.

== Biography ==
Jed Madela was born in Iloilo City, Iloilo, the son of JC Roy Madela Tajanlangit, a church choirmaster, and Agnes Taleon Tiña, an Administrative Assistant at Pepsi. He is the elder brother of Eric Tajanlangit and Joanne Christine Tajanlangit.

== Personal life ==
Madela was baptized as a Roman Catholic. He is currently single and has no children.

== Education ==
He graduated with a Bachelor of Science degree in Business Administration at University of San Agustin in Iloilo City.

== Career ==
In 2003, 16 Asian countries participated in the Voice of Asia consisting of 18 contestants. He became the first official male representative from the Philippines to participate in that aforementioned contest. He ranked 1st place consistently for 3 days in the internet poll survey, and was given the "People's Choice Award" on the finals night for being the Grand Champion in the internet polls. He also won the Silver Trophy, judged by a panel of jury in the actual competition. He received a plaque for being the "Sponsor's Choice" in the competition. Five months later, Mainhill Awards of Kazakhstan awarded him as the "Best Voice of Asia Male Singer of the Year 2003". He shared the limelight with George Benson and Billy Joel who both received the Lifetime Achievement Awards in the same award-giving body. Madela's powerful voice was showcased at the competition, as he sang these three winning pieces: "I'll Be Around"; "Labis Akong Umibig" (I Loved Too Much); and his showstopping festival arrangement of Martin Nievera's classic hit "Be My Lady", wherein he held the final high note for 17 seconds that elicited a standing ovation from the spectators at the venue. All songs were composed by Mr. Vehnee Saturno who was with him during the competition in Kazakhstan.

Often referred to as "The Voice" and "The Singer's Singer" by the media, Jed Madela is one of the best male singers the country has ever produced. Jed made waves during the 2005 World Championship of the Performing Arts (WCOPA) in Hollywood California when he single-handedly won all major industry awards, 6 gold medals for all 6 categories he joined, the Champion Vocalist World Star Trophy, and the most coveted and ultimate title "Grand Champion Performer of the World", the first Filipino to win the title. He bested over 3,000 contestants from 52 countries to win the grand prize. There were six categories whereby Jed won gold. For the pop category, he sang "I'm Your Angel". For the original song category, meaning a composition from the singer's home country, he did Martin Nievera's old hit, "Be My Lady". For Broadway ("Home"), pop duet (with Rizza Navales, they sang ("Last Night of the World"), gospel ("Take Me Out of the Dark"), and for the final song that made him as the grand champion, he sang Aerosmith's "I Don't Wanna Miss A Thing". He also brought home two Champion of the World plaques, one star trophy for the award Grand Champion of the World in the singing division and the trophy for the Grand Champion Performer of the World.

Madela is the first Filipino artist to be inducted into the Hall of Fame of the World Championships of Performing Arts (WCOPA), ranking him alongside renowned actress-singer Liza Minnelli.

World Championships of Performing Arts (WCOPA) is a true International "Olympic" style event with over 55 licensed countries competing for both Junior and Senior Grand Champion of the World of Performing Arts. Singers, dancers, instrumentalist, actors, models and variety artist travel from around the World to participate in an opening ceremony, continue their education through boot camp training, network with Hollywood Industry professionals, be entertained at the Worldstars Village, as well as compete for the "Gold."

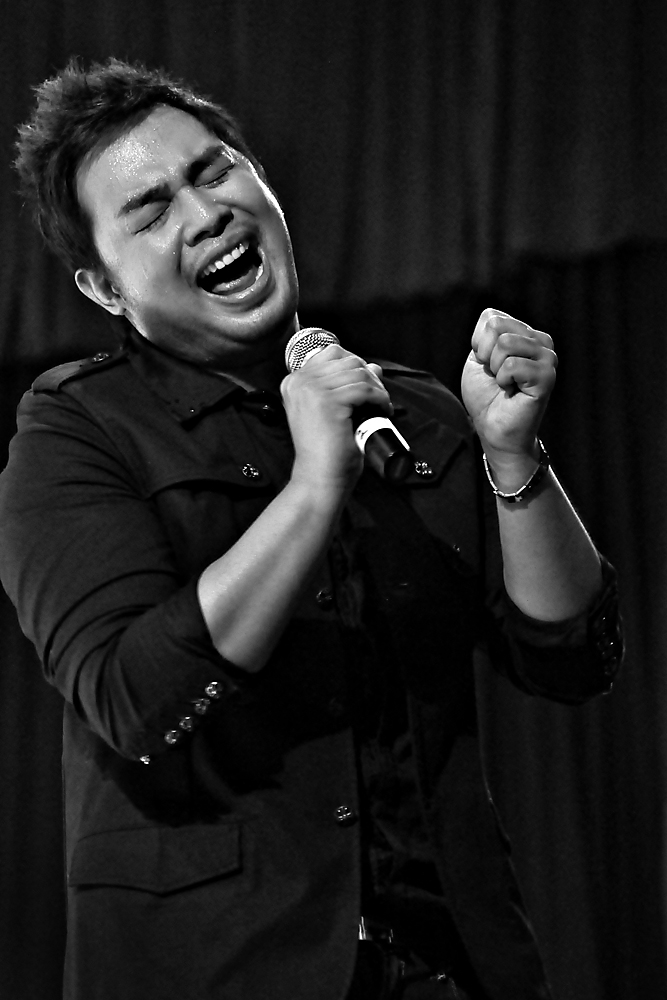
Madela in 2010

Madela has released 10 albums to date. His debut album, "I'll Be Around", includes the radio smash "Let Me Love You (From The Bottom of My Heart)". His second album, "Songs Rediscovered", was certified double platinum; while his third album "Only Human", went gold. He also released his first Christmas CD, "The Voice Of Christmas" in 2007, which also went gold. He released "Songs Rediscovered 2: The Ultimate OPM Playlist", the perfect follow-up to the Double Platinum-certified "Songs Rediscovered". The new CD is a distinguished collection of timeless OPM songs from the '80s and '90s, sung to perfection by a voice that is once heard, never forgotten. "The Classics Album" and "Breathe Again" followed. His album under Star Records is called All Original, a 10 track album of fresh original tracks, one of which was written by Jed himself.

In January 2015, he quietly launched his latest album "Iconic" without notice, making him the first Filipino artist to release an album unannounced. Living up to its album title, "Iconic" features Jed Madela's unique versions of tracks by music icons such as Madonna, Mariah Carey, Celine Dion, and Whitney Houston. He is the only male Filipino artist to release an album featuring the said divas' hits. He also experiments with new sound and sumptuous beats with EDM-laced tracks such as his remake of Christina Aguilera's pop ballad "Beautiful," "Like A Prayer (Brian Cua Sunset Remix)," "Beautiful (Moophs Remix)," and his original composition "Welcome to My World," which acts as the album's opening and closing tracks served up in two versions. Also included on the 14-track list are Jed's remakes of Barbra Streisand, Gloria Estefan, Tiffany, and Toni Braxton. "Iconic," produced by Jonathan Manalo and Madela himself.

He is currently enjoying sell-out concerts in the Philippines and around the world. He is also a mainstay of ABS-CBN's Sunday noontime show ASAP, a mentor on Your Face Sounds Familiar and a regular judge on Tawag ng Tanghalan, an amateur singing competition currently aired as a segment of the noontime show It's Showtime.

As a way of giving back, Madela has spent time mentoring aspiring artists.

== Voice ==
Madela possesses the vocal range of a countertenor, spanning from his lowest note at F#2, to his highest note at Bb5.

== Filmography ==
=== Television ===
Year	Title	Role	Network	Notes and Awards
2005–present	ASAP	Main Stay Performer	ABS-CBN	
2010	May Bukas Pa	Choir	ABS-CBN	episode "Santino surprises everyone"
2015	Your Face Sounds Familiar (season 1)	Jury	ABS-CBN	
2015	Your Face Sounds Familiar (season 2)	Jury	ABS-CBN	
2017	Tawag ng Tanghalan Kids	Judge	ABS-CBN	
2017–present	Tawag ng Tanghalan (season 2)	Judge	ABS-CBN	
2018	Your Face Sounds Familiar Kids (season 2)	Celebrity mentor (vocals)	ABS-CBN	
2021	Your Face Sounds Familiar (season 3)	Celebrity mentor (vocals)	A2Z/Kapamilya Channel	
2022	Barangay PIE Silog Sunday: Pasok Mga Suki	Himself	PIE Channel	Featured celebrity entrepreneur
2024–present	It's Showtime	Himself	Kapamilya Channel/A2Z/ALLTV/GMA Network/GTV	

=== Film ===
Year	Title	Role	Film Production	Notes and Awards
2006	All About Love	Singer	Star Cinema	segment "About Anna"
2010	Shake, Rattle and Roll 12	Garbage man	Regal Films	segment "Mamanyika"

== Concerts ==
Solo concerts

Solo concerts
Year	Title	Details
2008	Music of the Night	July 11, 2008; Philam Life Theater
2009	Jed Madela: The Voice	August 15, 2009; Waterfront Hotel Lahug Cebu City
2009	Jed Madela: One Voice	November 27, 2009; Philam Life Theater
2009	Jed Madela: The Greatest Gift	December 8, 2009; Mandarin Oriental Ballroom
2010	The Greatest Love	February 10, 2010; Mandarin Oriental Ballroom
2010	The Voice of Love in Lucena	February 27, 2010; Quezon Convention Center
2010	Jed Madela Live in Toronto	October 16, 2010; Imperial Oil Auditorium
2010	A Classic Christmas	November 28, 2010; Newport Performing Arts Theater
2011	Jed Madela: What I Did For Love	May 13, 2011; Hotel del Rio Iloilo
2012	Back to Basics	May 18, 2012; Music Museum
2013	Jed Madela: The 10th Anniversary Concert	November 15, 2013; PICC Plenary Hall
2013	Romancing Ivory	December 18, 2013; Tanghalang Nicanor Abelardo (CCP Main Theater)
2014	Perfect Combination	May 31, 2014; Pala Casino Spa Resort
2014	All Requests 2	September 12, 2014; Music Museum
2014	All Requests 3	November 21, 2014; Music Museum
2015	All Requests 4	February 12, 2015; Music Museum
2016	The Iconic Concert Series: Jed Madela Sings... Mariah	May 28, 2016; Music Museum
2016	Heart of the Filipino Benefit Concert	June 11, 2016; Grand Ballroom, Conrad Hong Kong, Pacific Place
2016	All Requests Chicago	July 24, 2016; Copernicus Center
2016	The Iconic Concert Series: Jed Madela Sings... Celine	August 19, 2016; Music Museum
2017	Unlimited Voices	June 16, 2017; Macias Sports Center
2017	La Voce A Dinner Concert	November 17, 2017; Waterfront Cebu City Hotel and Casino
2018	All About Love	February 14, 2018; KIA Theatre
2018	Jed Madela Higher Than High: The 15th Anniversary Concert	November 16, 2018; Araneta Coliseum

Supporting acts
Year	Concert Title	Artist	Venue
2018	Love Always Tour	Shane Filan	SMX Convention Center, Davao

== Discography ==
- I'll Be Around (2003)
- Songs Rediscovered (2004)
- Only Human (2007)
- The Voice of Christmas (2007)
- Songs Rediscovered 2: The Ultimate OPM Playlist (2009)
- The Classics Album (2010)
- Breathe Again (2011)
- All Original (2013)
- Iconic (2015)
- Superhero (2019)
