= Your Face Sounds Familiar (Philippine TV series) season 2 =

Your Face Sounds Familiar
- Season 2
- Hosted by: Billy Crawford; Melai Cantiveros
- Judges: Gary Valenciano; Jed Madela; Sharon Cuneta
- Winner: Denise Laurel
- Runner-up: Michael Pangilinan
- Finals venue: Newport Performing Arts Theater, Resorts World Manila, Pasay, Philippines
- No. of episodes: 28

Release
- Original network: ABS-CBN; The Filipino Channel (International broadcaster)
- Original release: September 12 – December 13, 2015

Season chronology
- ← Previous; Season 1 Next → Season 3

The second season of Your Face Sounds Familiar was a singing and impersonation competition for celebrities on ABS-CBN. Sharon Cuneta, Gary Valenciano and Jed Madela reprise their duties as judges. Billy Crawford also returns as host; however, he is accompanied by Melai Cantiveros, the winner of the first season on September 10 to December 13, 2015.

The show replaced the second season of The Voice Kids and began airing on September 12, 2015.

After 14 weeks, Denise Laurel emerged as the winner after garnering 27.51% of the public's votes. Laurel is the only contestant who did not win in any weekly competition of the show, meaning she received no prizes before the conclusion of the grand showdown.

== Development ==
On June 6, 2015, during the first season's grand showdown, it was announced that the show will return for a second season. It premiered in September 2015, taking over the time slot vacated by the then-recently concluded second season of The Voice Kids.

In August 2015, Melai Cantiveros, the winner of the first season was announced to co-host the show, impersonating different icons. Sharon Cuneta, Gary Valenciano, Jed Madela, and Billy Crawford were reported to return to the show to reprise their duties.

The performers for the show were revealed during the finals weekend of the second season of The Voice Kids, in which host Billy Crawford and the jury dueted with the season's finalists.

On November 14, 2015, the show moved its timeslot to 9:30 p.m. on Saturdays and 9:15 p.m. on Sundays after Pinoy Big Brother: 737 ended and gave its original timeslot to Dance Kids.

== Hosts, Judges and Mentors ==
The hosts and judges of Your Face Sounds Familiar Season 2

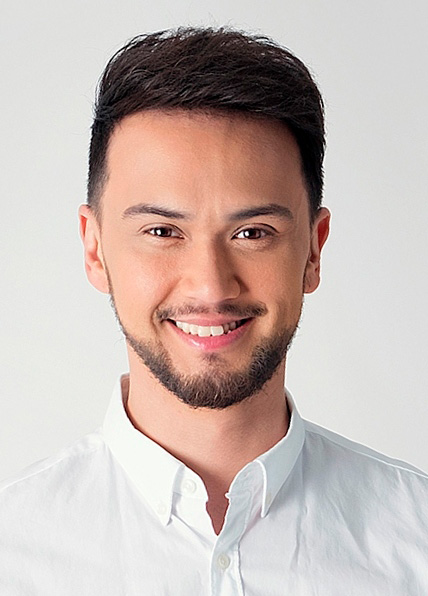
Billy Crawford

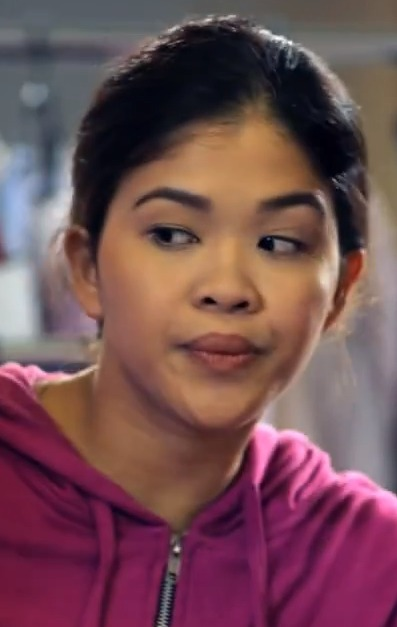
Melai Cantiveros

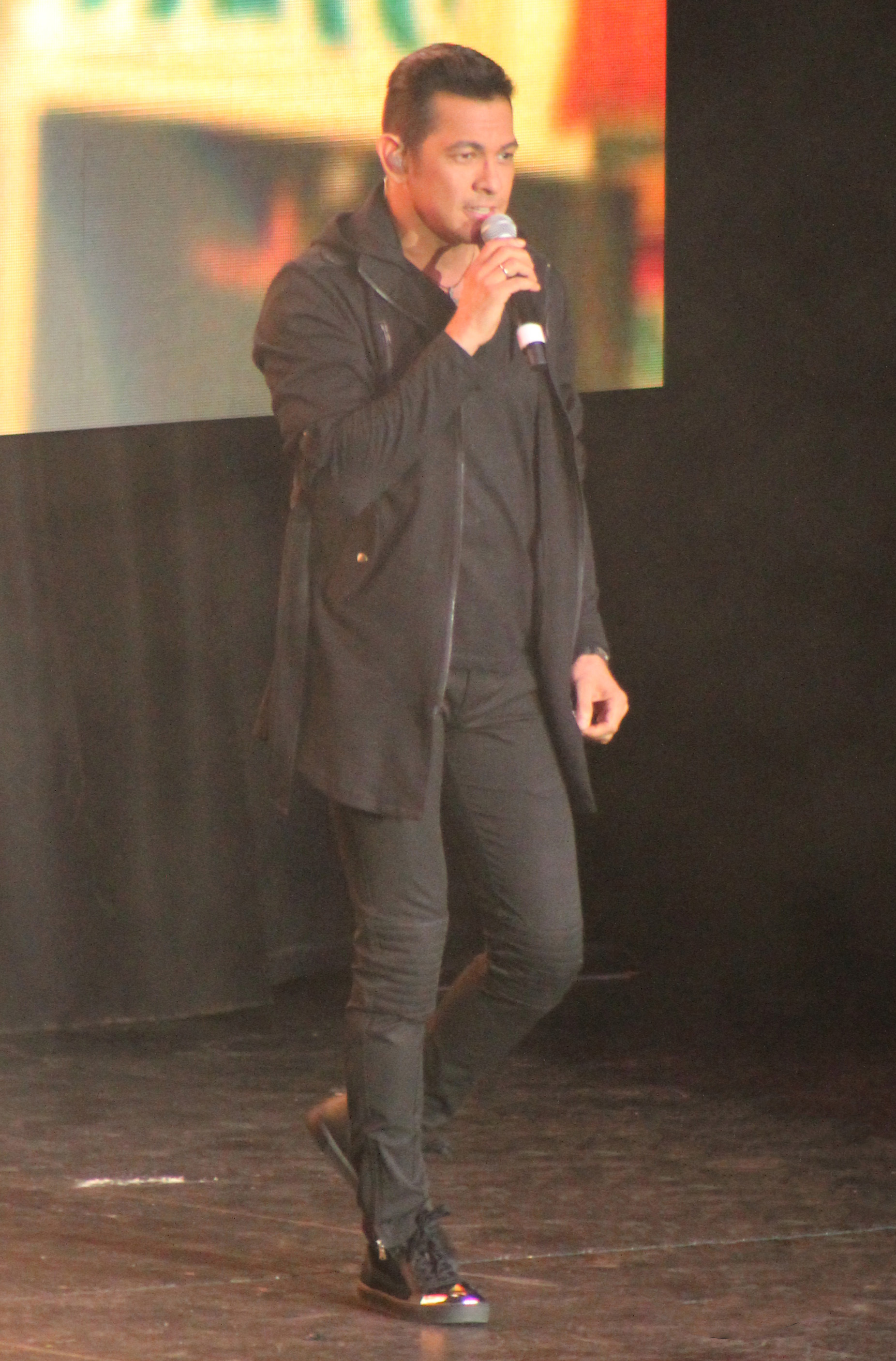
Gary Valenciano

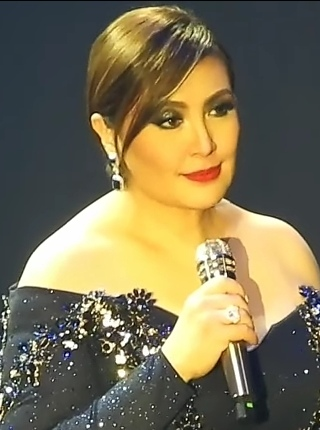
Sharon Cuneta

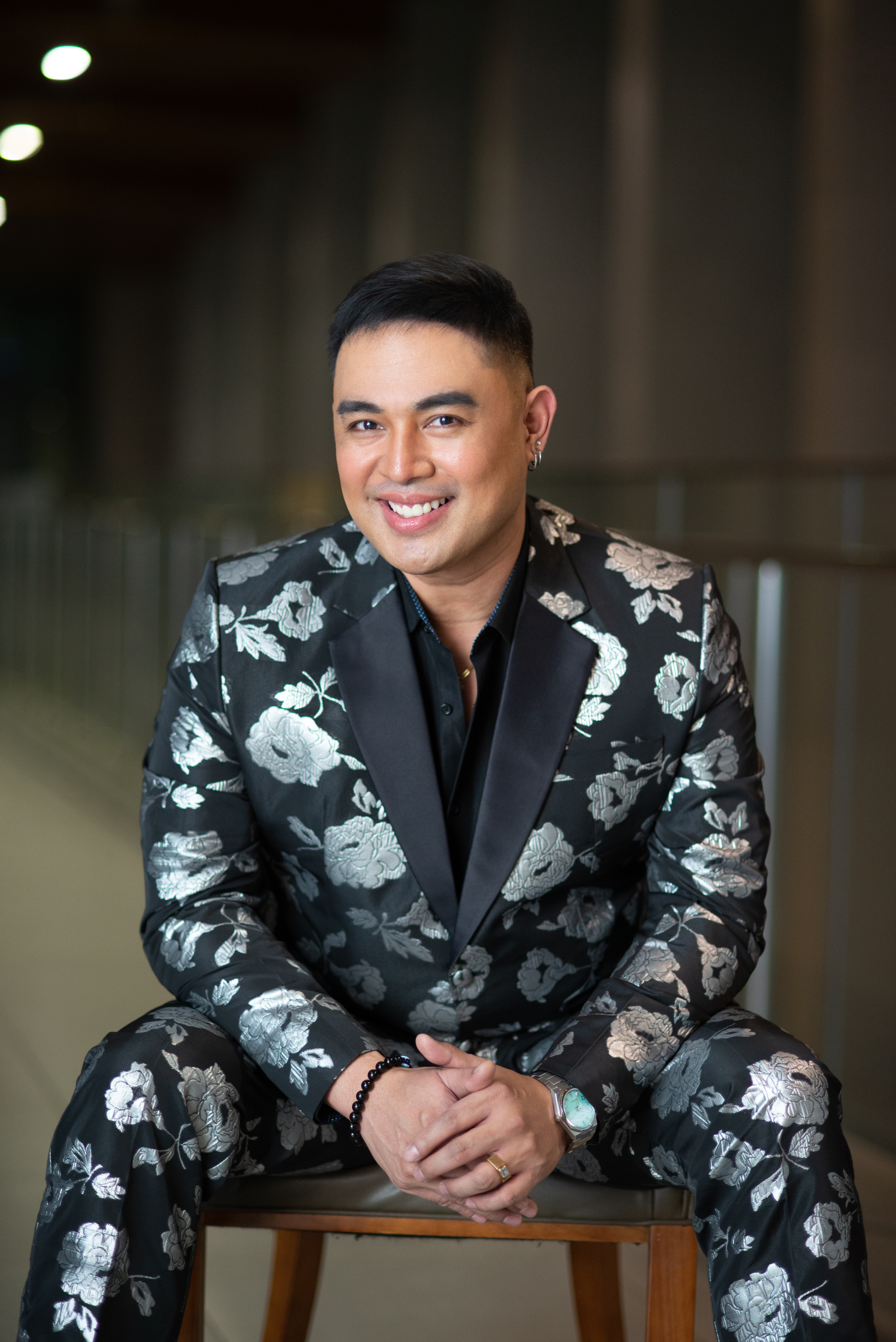
Jed Madela

=== Hosts ===
Billy Crawford returns as the main host with season 1 winner Melai Cantiveros joining him as a co-host, impersonating different icons each week.

=== Judges ===
The judges, dubbed as "The Jury" in the show:

The Jury

- Sharon Cuneta
- Gary Valenciano
- Jed Madela

Guest judges

- Boy Abunda (Madela's substitute judges for Week 3)
- Georcelle Dapat of G-Force & Annie Quintos of The Company (Cuneta's substitute judges for Week 6 and 13)
- Rico J. Puno and Karla Estrada (Madela's substitute judges for Week 10)
- Randy Santiago (Madela's substitute judges for Week 11)

=== Mentors ===
Annie Quintos of The Company served as the mentor for vocals while Georcelle Dapat of G-Force served as the mentor for choreography and movement.

== Contestants ==
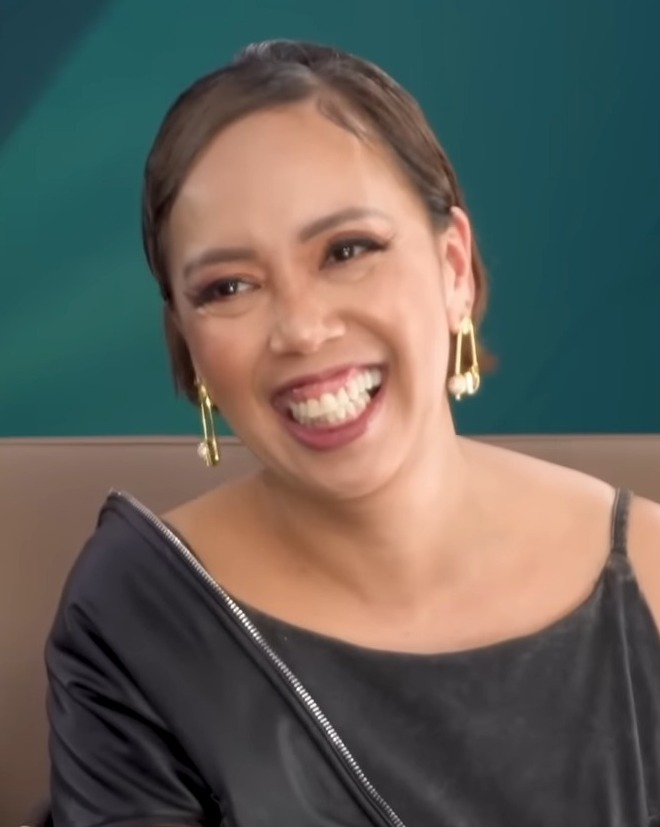
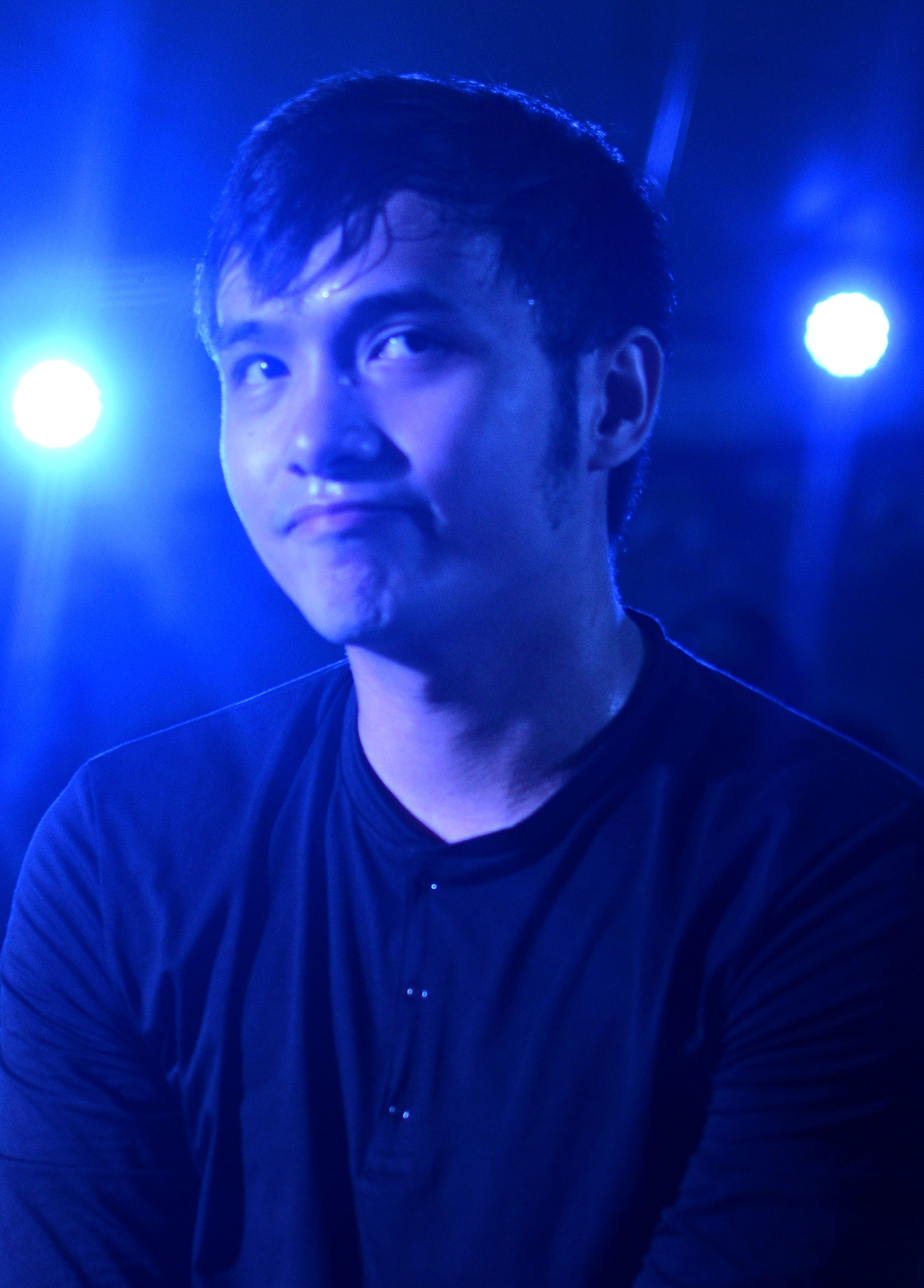
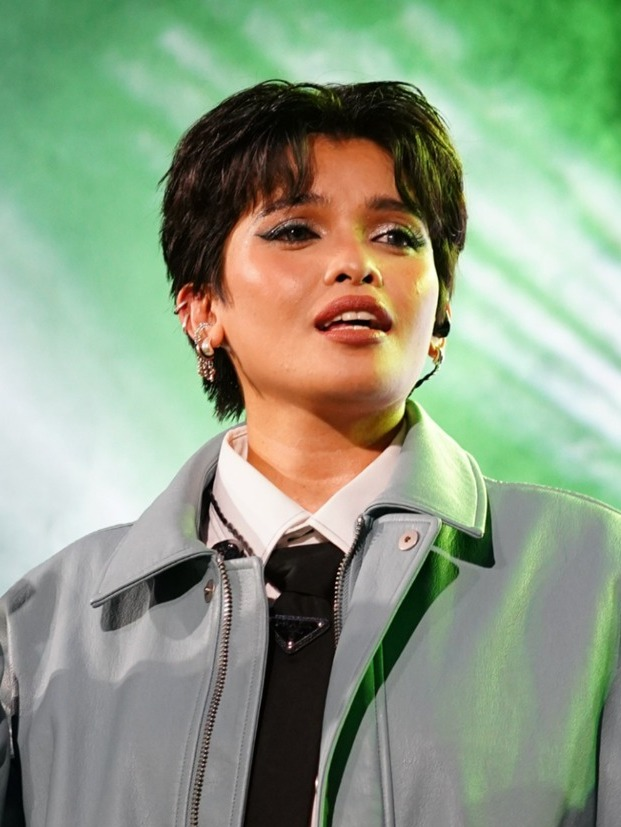
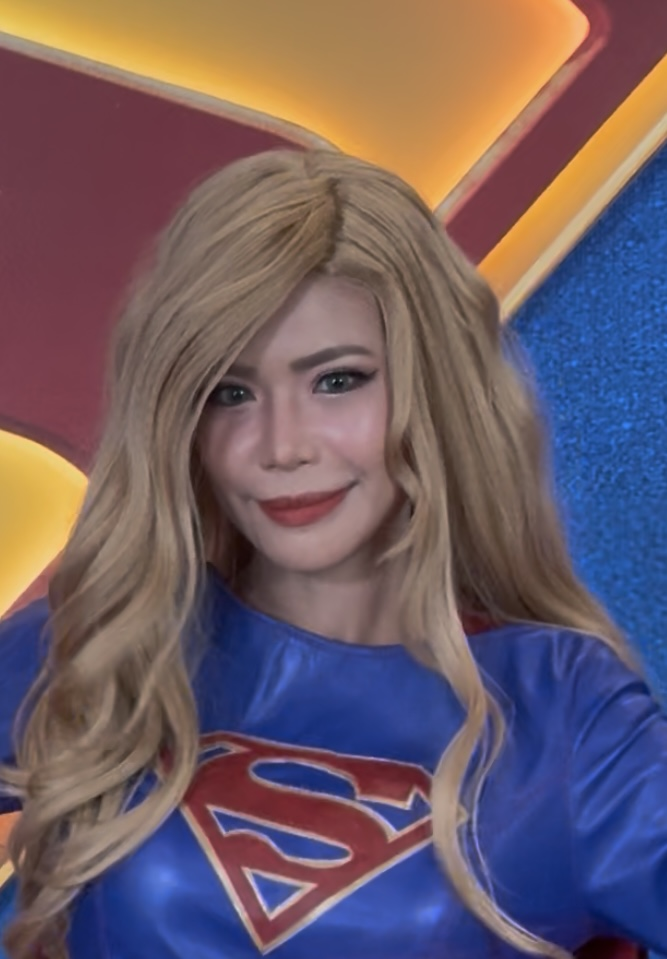
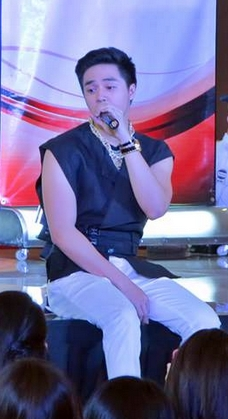
From left to right: Kakai Bautista, Kean Cipriano, KZ Tandingan, Myrtle Sarrosa, Sam Concepcion

The contestants and their monikers were revealed on August 29, 2015, during the finals of the second season of The Voice Kids. Note that KZ Tandingan was mostly shown without her last name during most of the season.

Celebrity performers of Your Face Sounds Familiar 2
Contestant	Notability	Result
Denise Laurel	Singer and actress	Winner (0 wins, 216 points)
Michael Pangilinan	Singer	Second Place (2 wins, 216 points)
Sam Concepcion	Singer and actor	Third Place (3 wins, 239 points)
KZ Tandingan	Singer	Fourth Place (2 wins, 242 points)
Kean Cipriano	Actor and band frontman	Fifth Place (3 wins, 245 points)
Eric Nicolas	Comedian and actor	Did not qualify (1 win, 198 points)
Kakai Bautista	Comedian and actress	Did not qualify (1 win, 196 points)
Myrtle Sarrosa	Cosplayer and host	Did not qualify (1 win, 164 points)

== Results summary ==
The table below shows the corresponding total points earned per week. Each performance is ranked in two parts. In the first part, The Jury gives 1, 2, 3, 4, 5, 6, 7 and 8 points to the performers respectively. In the second part, all of the performers give 3 points to another contestant other than him or her.

Legend

- Winner
- Runner-up
- Third place
- Fourth place
- Fifth place
- Top 5 contestants with the highest final total points
- Eliminated contestants with the lowest final total points
- Contestant won that particular week due to the jury's decision
- Contestant had one of the highest scores but was not chosen to win that particular week
- Contestant won that particular week
- Contestant placed last that particular week

Contestant	Week 1	Week 2	Week 3	Week 4	Week 5	Week 6	Week 7	Week 8	Week 9	Week 10	Week 11	Week 12	Week 13	Final Total Points	Finals
Denise	5th 12 points	7th 8 points	4th-5th 15 points	2nd 23 points	2nd 24 points	3rd 20 points	2nd 21 points	7th 5 points	7th 6 points	5th 15 points	1st-4th 24 points	2nd 25 points	4th 18 points	4th-5th 216 points	Winner; 27.51%
Michael	7th-8th 5 points	2nd 26 points	3rd 18 points	4th 14 points	7th-8th 6 points	5th 12 points	3rd 20 points	8th 4 points	1st 40 points	7th-8th 7 points	5th 18 points	4th 19 points	1st 27 points	4th-5th 216 points	2nd Place; 23.87%
Sam	2nd 27 points	1st 27 points	2nd 23 points	6th 12 points	1st 27 points	8th 4 points	8th 3 points	6th 14 points	6th 8 points	6th 14 points	1st-4th 24 points	1st 36 points	3rd 20 points	3rd 239 points	3rd Place; 20.57%
KZ	7th-8th 5 points	6th 10 points	8th 10 points	1st 39 points	4th 18 points	6th-7th 8 points	4th 18 points	1st 30 points	2nd 27 points	4th 20 points	1st-4th 24 points	6th 9 points	2nd 24 points	2nd 242 points	4th Place; 19.89%
Kean	4th 15 points	3rd 22 points	1st 27 points	3rd 22 points	5th 15 points	2nd 24 points	7th 6 points	2nd-3rd 23 points	5th 11 points	1st 25 points	1st-4th 24 points	3rd 21 points	6th-7th 10 points	1st 245 points	5th Place; 8.16%
Eric	1st 42 points	4th 21 points	6th-7th 12 points	5th 13 points	6th 14 points	4th 18 points	5th 14 points	5th 15 points	8th 5 points	2nd 23 points	7th 6 points	7th-8th 5 points	6th-7th 10 points	6th 198 points	Eliminated (Week 13)
Kakai	3rd 18 points	8th 6 points	4th-5th 15 points	7th 5 points	3rd 22 points	6th-7th 8 points	1st 39 points	2nd-3rd 23 points	4th 17 points	3rd 21 points	8th 3 points	5th 12 points	8th 7 points	7th 196 points	Eliminated (Week 13)
Myrtle	6th 8 points	5th 12 points	6th-7th 12 points	8th 4 points	7th-8th 6 points	1st 38 points	6th 11 points	4th 18 points	3rd 18 points	7th-8th 7 points	6th 9 points	7th-8th 5 points	5th 16 points	8th 164 points	Eliminated (Week 13)

== Performances ==
The eight performances are divided into two nights – the first five contestants perform during Saturdays and the remaining three during Sundays.

Color key

- Contestant won that particular week
- Contestant placed last that particular week

=== Week 1 (September 12 & 13) ===
Non-competition performance

- Melai Cantiveros as Madonna – "Papa Don't Preach"

Episode hashtag

- #YFSFNewSeason (Saturday)
- #AllNewYFSF (Sunday)

Order	Contestant	Performance	Total points	Rank
1	Sam Concepcion	Eminem – "The Real Slim Shady"	27	2nd
2	Myrtle Sarrosa	Sandara Park of 2NE1 – "Fire"	8	6th
3	KZ Tandingan	Vina Morales – "Pangako Sa'yo"	5	7th-8th
4	Kakai Bautista	Sia – "Chandelier"	18	3rd
5	Denise Laurel	Jennifer Lopez – "On the Floor"	12	5th
6	Michael Pangilinan	George Michael – "Careless Whisper"	5	7th-8th
7	Kean Cipriano	Harry Styles of One Direction – "What Makes You Beautiful"	15	4th
8	Eric Nicolas	Willie Revillame – "Ikaw Na Nga"	42	1st

=== Week 2 (September 19 & 20) ===
Non-competition impersonator

- Melai Cantiveros as Dionisia Pacquiao

Episode hashtag

- #YFSFAngSaya (Saturday)
- #SayaNgYFSF (Sunday)

Order	Contestant	Performance	Total points	Rank
1	Kean Cipriano	Randy Santiago – "Babaero"	22	3rd
2	Myrtle Sarrosa	Jessa Zaragoza – "Bakit Pa?"	12	5th
3	Denise Laurel	Christina Aguilera – "Lady Marmalade"	8	7th
4	Michael Pangilinan	Janno Gibbs – "Binibini"	26	2nd
5	Eric Nicolas	Louis Armstrong – "What a Wonderful World"	21	4th
6	Sam Concepcion	Jason Derulo – "Talk Dirty"	27	1st
7	KZ Tandingan	P!nk – "Just Give Me a Reason"	10	6th
8	Kakai Bautista	Ai-Ai de las Alas – "Tanging Ina"	6	8th

=== Week 3 (September 26 & 27) ===
Non-competition impersonator

- Melai Cantiveros as Georcelle Dapat of G-Force

Episode hashtag

- #YFSFIkawNa (Saturday)
- #YFSFHumBam (Sunday)

Guest juror

- Boy Abunda (substitute for Jed Madela)

Order	Contestant	Performance	Total points	Rank
1	KZ Tandingan	Bob Marley of Bob Marley & the Wailers – "Waiting in Vain"	10	8th
2	Myrtle Sarrosa	Armida Siguion-Reyna – "Aawitan Kita"	12	6th-7th
3	Michael Pangilinan	Nick Jonas – "Jealous"	18	3rd
4	Kakai Bautista	Sheena Easton – "Telefone"	15	4th-5th
5	Eric Nicolas	Bayani Agbayani – "Otso Otso"	12	6th-7th
6	Sam Concepcion	Janet Jackson – "Escapade"	23	2nd
7	Denise Laurel	Alicia Keys – "Girl on Fire"	15	4th-5th
8	Kean Cipriano	Fernando Poe, Jr. – "Kumusta Ka"	27	1st

=== Week 4 (October 3 & 4) ===
Non-competition impersonator

- Melai Cantiveros as Boy Abunda

Episode hashtag

- #YFSFEksklusibo (Saturday)
- #YFSFNowNa (Sunday)

Order	Contestant	Performance	Total points	Rank
1	Eric Nicolas	Pitbull – "I Know You Want Me (Calle Ocho)"	13	5th
2	Denise Laurel	Ne-Yo – "Closer"	23	2nd
3	Sam Concepcion	Rey Valera – "Walang Kapalit"	12	6th
4	Kakai Bautista	Donna Cruz – "Kapag Tumibok ang Puso"	5	7th
5	Myrtle Sarrosa	Marilyn Monroe – "Diamonds Are a Girl's Best Friend"	4	8th
6	Kean Cipriano	Avril Lavigne – "Sk8er Boi"	22	3rd
7	Michael Pangilinan	Michael V. – "Sinaktan Mo ang Puso Ko"	14	4th
8	KZ Tandingan	Jessie J – "Price Tag"	39	1st

=== Week 5 (October 10 & 11) ===
Non-competition impersonator

- Melai Cantiveros as Kim Atienza

Episode hashtags

- #YFSFSaturdate (Saturday)
- #YFSFSundate (Sunday)

Order	Contestant	Performance	Total points	Rank
1	Kean Cipriano	Dolphy – "Fly Me to the Moon"	15	5th
2	KZ Tandingan	Amy Winehouse – "Rehab"	18	4th
3	Myrtle Sarrosa	Jerry Yan of F4 – "Can't Lose You"	6	7th-8th
4	Michael Pangilinan	Brandon Beal – "Twerk It Like Miley"	6	7th-8th
5	Kakai Bautista	Donna Summer – "Last Dance"	22	3rd
6	Eric Nicolas	Whoopi Goldberg – "I Will Follow Him"	14	6th
7	Denise Laurel	Lea Salonga – "Bakit Labis Kitang Mahal?"	24	2nd
8	Sam Concepcion	Dong Abay of Yano – "Banal na Aso, Santong Kabayo"	27	1st

=== Week 6 (October 17 & 18) ===
Due to being ill at the time of taping, Melai Cantiveros was unable to appear during the week's episodes.

Guest jurors

- Georcelle Dapat of G-Force & Annie Quintos of The Company (substitute for Sharon Cuneta) (2 in 1 judge, score counts as 1)

Episode hashtag

- #YFSFVersatile

Order	Contestant	Performance	Total points	Rank
1	Sam Concepcion	Rick Astley – "Together Forever"	4	8th
2	Eric Nicolas	Martin Nievera – "Be My Lady"	18	4th
3	Denise Laurel	Thalía – "Maria Mercedes"	20	3rd
4	Kakai Bautista	Willy Garte – "Bawal na Gamot"	8	6th-7th
5	KZ Tandingan	Fergie of Black Eyed Peas – "My Humps"	8	6th-7th
6	Kean Cipriano	Silentó – "Watch Me (Whip/Nae Nae)"	24	2nd
7	Michael Pangilinan	Jay R – "Bakit Pa Ba?"	12	5th
8	Myrtle Sarrosa	Mystica – "Simple Lang"	38	1st

=== Week 7 (October 24 & 25) ===
Non-competition impersonator

- Melai Cantiveros as Doris Bigornia

Episode hashtag

- #YFSFPangMasa (Saturday)
- #YFSFPampamilya (Sunday)

Order	Contestant	Performance	Total points	Rank
1	Kean Cipriano	Jose Mari Chan – "Beautiful Girl"	6	7th
2	Myrtle Sarrosa	Nicole Scherzinger of The Pussycat Dolls – "Don't Cha"	11	6th
3	KZ Tandingan	Lolita Carbon of Asin – "Himig ng Pag-ibig"	18	4th
4	Michael Pangilinan	Tracy Chapman – "Baby Can I Hold You"	20	3rd
5	Denise Laurel	Jed Madela – "The Impossible Dream"	21	2nd
6	Eric Nicolas	Apache Indian – "Boom Shack-A-Lak"	14	5th
7	Sam Concepcion	Ogie Alcasid – "Nandito Ako"	3	8th
8	Kakai Bautista	Julie Andrews – "The Sound of Music"	39	1st

=== Week 8 (October 31 & November 1) ===
Non-competition impersonator

- Melai Cantiveros as Charky (Chucky from Child's Play)

Episode Hashtag

- #YFSFGoosebumps (Saturday)
- #YFSFKilabot (Sunday)

Order	Contestant	Performance	Total points	Rank
1	Kakai Bautista	Jennifer Holliday – "And I Am Telling You I'm Not Going"	23	2nd-3rd
2	Eric Nicolas	Claire de la Fuente – "Sayang"	15	5th
3	Michael Pangilinan	Hajji Alejandro – "Kay Ganda ng Ating Musika"	4	8th
4	Myrtle Sarrosa	Kuh Ledesma – "Dito Ba?"	18	4th
5	Kean Cipriano	Anthony Kiedis of Red Hot Chili Peppers – "Give It Away"	23	2nd-3rd
6	Sam Concepcion	James Reid – "Natataranta"	14	6th
7	Denise Laurel	Toni Braxton – "Un-Break My Heart"	5	7th
8	KZ Tandingan	Abra – "Gayuma"	30	1st

=== Week 9 (November 7 & 8) ===
Owing to the Big Night of Pinoy Big Brother: 737, the show was aired on 10:45 PM on Saturday and at 10:15 PM on Sunday rather than the regular timeslot.

Non-competition impersonator

- Melai Cantiveros as Vilma Santos

Episode Hashtags

- #YFSF4AllSeasons (Saturday)
- #YFSFGrandSlam (Sunday)

Order	Contestant	Performance	Total points	Rank
1	Denise Laurel	Gloria Estefan of Miami Sound Machine – "Conga"	6	7th
2	KZ Tandingan	Tina Turner – "What's Love Got to Do with It"	27	2nd
3	Myrtle Sarrosa	Britney Spears – I'm a Slave 4 U"	18	3rd
4	Sam Concepcion	Mandy Moore – "Cry"	8	6th
5	Kakai Bautista	Eva Eugenio – "Tukso"	17	4th
6	Kean Cipriano	Robi Rosa of Menudo – "Explosion"	11	5th
7	Michael Pangilinan	Bono of U2 – "With or Without You"	40	1st
8	Eric Nicolas	Jett Pangan of The Dawn – "Salamat"	5	8th

=== Week 10 (November 14 & 15) ===
This episode was the first episode pair to air at a later timeslot of 9:30 PM on Saturdays and 9:15 PM on Sundays after the timeslot was changed following the premiere of Dance Kids.

Week's Challenge

- Duet with and impersonate an OPM icon

Non-competition impersonator

- Melai Cantiveros as Billy Crawford

Guest jurors

- Rico J. Puno and Karla Estrada (substitute for Jed Madela)

Episode Hashtags

- #YFSFOPMFaceOff (Saturday)
- #YFSFOPMHarapan (Sunday)

Order	Contestant	Dueted artist and Performance	Total points	Rank
1	KZ Tandingan	Charice – "Pyramid"	20	4th
2	Myrtle Sarrosa	Verni Varga – "You'll Always Be My Number One"	7	7th-8th
3	Denise Laurel	Imelda Papin – "Bakit"	15	5th
4	Sam Concepcion	Erik Santos – "This Is the Moment"	14	6th
5	Kean Cipriano	Richard Poon – "Kahit Maputi Na Ang Buhok Ko"	25	1st
6	Eric Nicolas	Andrew E. – "Mahirap Maging Pogi"	23	2nd
7	Michael Pangilinan	Marco Sison – "Si Aida o Si Lorna o Si Fe"	7	7th-8th
8	Kakai Bautista	Jovit Baldivino – "Too Much Love Will Kill You"	21	3rd

=== Week 11 (November 21 & 22) ===
Week's Challenge

- Duet with and impersonate an OPM band leader

Non-competition impersonator

- Melai Cantiveros as Pepe Smith of Juan de la Cruz Band

Guest juror

- Randy Santiago (substitute for Jed Madela)

Episode Hashtags

- #YFSFRocks (Saturday)
- #YFSFJams (Sunday)

Order	Contestant	Dueted artist and Performance	Total points	Rank
1	Kakai Bautista	Jugs Jugueta of Itchyworms – "Beer"	3	8th
2	Sam Concepcion	Mike Hanopol of Juan de la Cruz Band – "No Touch"	24	1st-4th
3	KZ Tandingan	Yael Yuzon of Sponge Cola – "Bitiw"	24	1st-4th
4	Myrtle Sarrosa	Cooky Chua of Color It Red – "Paglisan"	9	6th
5	Eric Nicolas	Heber Bartolome of Banyuhay – "Tayo'y Mga Pinoy"	6	7th
6	Kean Cipriano	Joey Ayala of Ang Bagong Lumad – "Karaniwang Tao"	24	1st-4th
7	Michael Pangilinan	Joey Generoso of Side A – "Forevermore"	18	5th
8	Denise Laurel	Jinky Vidal of Freestyle – "So Slow"	24	1st-4th

Notes

1. Owing to a four-way tie between Sam Concepcion, Kean Cipirano, Denise Laurel, and KZ Tandingan, the Jury collectively selected a winner (Cipirano) between those whom are tied.

=== Week 12 (November 28 & 29) ===
Week's Challenge

- Duet with the season 1 contestants

Episode hashtags

- #YFSFAllStar (Saturday)
- #YFSFHomecoming (Sunday)

Order	Contestants	Performance	Total points	Rank
1	Eric Nicolas with Melai Cantiveros	John Travolta and Olivia Newton-John – "Summer Nights"	5	7th-8th
2	Denise Laurel with Jay R	Barbra Streisand and Bryan Adams – "I Finally Found Someone"	25	2nd
3	Kakai Bautista with Maxene Magalona	Ariana Grande and Iggy Azalea – "Problem"	12	5th
4	Myrtle Sarrosa with Edgar Allan Guzman	Kylie Minogue and Jason Donovan – "Especially for You"	5	7th-8th
5	Kean Cipriano with Tutti Caringal	Mick Jagger and David Bowie – "Dancing in the Street"	21	3rd
6	KZ Tandingan with Nyoy Volante	Shakira and Beyoncé – "Beautiful Liar"	9	6th
7	Sam Concepcion with Jolina Magdangal	Andrea Bocelli and Celine Dion – "The Prayer"	36	1st
8	Michael Pangilinan with Karla Estrada	Luther Vandross and Mariah Carey – "Endless Love"	19	4th

=== Week 13 (December 5 & 6) ===
Week's Challenge

- Duet with oneself

Episode hashtags

- #YFSFDuetYourself (Saturday)
- #YFSFFinal4 (Sunday)

Non-competition impersonator

- Melai Cantiveros as Miley Cyrus

Guest jurors

- Georcelle Dapat of G-Force & Annie Quintos of The Company (substitute for Sharon Cuneta) (2-in-1 jurors)

Order	Contestant	Performance	Total points	Rank
1	KZ Tandingan	Liza Minnelli and Luciano Pavarotti – "New York, New York"	24	2nd
2	Michael Pangilinan	Sam Smith and John Legend – "Lay Me Down"	27	1st
3	Denise Laurel	Lady Gaga and Tony Bennett – "The Lady is a Tramp"	18	4th
4	Kakai Bautista	Whitney Houston and Cissy Houston – "I Know Him So Well"	7	8th
5	Kean Cipriano	Paul McCartney and Stevie Wonder – "Ebony and Ivory"	10	6th-7th
6	Sam Concepcion	Michael Jackson and Justin Timberlake – "Love Never Felt So Good"	20	3rd
7	Myrtle Sarrosa	Nicki Minaj and Rihanna – "Fly"	16	5th
8	Eric Nicolas	Nat King Cole and Natalie Cole – "Unforgettable"	10	6th-7th

=== Finals: Week 14 (December 12 & 13) ===
The finals of the show, dubbed The Grand Showdown, was held on December 12–13, 2015 at the Newport Performing Arts Theater, Resorts World Manila. The finalists were given the chance to impersonate an icon of their choice.

Since Laurel and Pangilinan tied for the fourth slot for the finals, both advanced to the finale adding an additional fifth finalist to the Grand Showdown. As Sarrosa, Nicolas and Bautista accumulated the fewest points prior to the finale, they were excluded from the finale, and instead performed as Barry Gibb, Maurice Gibb and Robin Gibb of Bee Gees in the following night as a non-competition performance.

Episode hashtags

- #YFSF2GrandShowdown (Saturday)
- #YFSF2GrandWinner (Sunday)

Order	Finalist	Performance	Vote percentage	Rank
1	Sam Concepcion	Justin Bieber – "Boyfriend" / "Sorry"	20.57%	Third Place
2	Denise Laurel	Beyoncé – "Love On Top" / "Crazy in Love"	27.51%	Winner
3	Kean Cipriano	Ricky Martin – "Livin' la Vida Loca"	8.16%	Fifth Place
4	KZ Tandingan	Lady Gaga – "Poker Face" / "Born This Way"	19.89%	Fourth Place
5	Michael Pangilinan	Adam Levine of Maroon 5 – "Sugar"	23.87%	Second Place

Non-competition performances
December 13

- Jed Madela, Sharon Cuneta and Gary Valenciano - "Christmas Medley"
- Eric Nicolas, Kakai Bautista and Myrtle Sarrosa – as Maurice Gibb, Robin Gibb and Barry Gibb of Bee Gees – "Night Fever"/"Stayin' Alive"/"Tragedy"

== Television ratings ==
Television ratings for Your Face Sounds Familiar on ABS-CBN were gathered from two major sources, namely from AGB Nielsen and Kantar Media. AGB Nielsen's survey ratings were gathered from Mega Manila households, while Kantar Media's survey ratings were gathered from urban and rural households all over the Philippines.

Episode		Original airdate	Timeslot (PST)	AGB Nielsen			Kantar Media			Source
Episode		Original airdate	Timeslot (PST)	Rating	Timeslot	Primetime	Rating	Timeslot	Primetime	Source
1	"Season premiere"	September 12, 2015	Saturday 8:45 p.m.	23.6%	#1	#3	31.7%	#1	#2	
2	"Week 1 Performance – part 2"	September 13, 2015	Sunday 8:45 p.m.	18.1%	#2	#4	27.3%	#1	#3	
3	"Week 2 Performance – part 1"	September 19, 2015	Saturday 8:45 p.m.	24.3%	#1	#3	29.4%	#1	#3	
4	"Week 2 Performance – part 2"	September 20, 2015	Sunday 8:45 p.m.	18.9%	#2	#4	24.6%	#1	#4	
5	"Week 3 Performance – part 1"	September 26, 2015	Saturday 8:35 p.m.	21.8%	#1	#4	23.3%	#1	#6	
6	"Week 3 Performance – part 2"	September 27, 2015	Sunday 8:45 p.m.	15.9%	#2	#4	22.5%	#1	#4	
7	"Week 4 Performance – part 1"	October 3, 2015	Saturday 8:45 p.m.	13.1%	#2	#8	19.2%	#1	#6	
8	"Week 4 Performance – part 2"	October 4, 2015	Sunday 8:45 p.m.	17.4%	#2	#5	21.3%	#1	#6	
9	"Week 5 Performance – part 1"	October 10, 2015	Saturday 8:45 p.m.	18.2%	#2	#5	24.5%	#1	#4	
10	"Week 5 Performance – part 2"	October 11, 2015	Sunday 8:45 p.m.	17.1%	#1	#3	22.8%	#1	#4	
11	"Week 6 Performance – part 1"	October 17, 2015	Saturday 8:45 p.m.	17.7%	#1	#5	18.6%	#1	#6	
12	"Week 6 Performance – part 2"	October 18, 2015	Sunday 8:45 p.m.	16.6%	#2	#5	19.2%	#3	#6	
13	"Week 7 Performance – part 1"	October 24, 2015	Saturday 8:45 p.m.	18.0%	#1	#5	23.1%	#1	#5	
14	"Week 7 Performance – part 2"	October 25, 2015	Sunday 8:45 p.m.	14.8%	#2	#5	21.6%	#1	#6	
15	"Week 8 Performance – part 1"	October 31, 2015	Saturday 8:45 p.m.	17.5%	#2	#5	22.0%	#1	#5	
16	"Week 8 Performance – part 2"	November 1, 2015	Sunday 8:45 p.m.	16.0%	#2	#4	19.6%	#3	#6	
17	"Week 9 Performance – part 1"	November 7, 2015	Saturday 10:30 p.m.	14.2%	#1	#6	12.3%	#1	#9	
18	"Week 9 Performance – part 2"	November 8, 2015	Sunday 10:15 p.m.	16.5%	#3	#6	15.3%	#1	#8	
19	"Week 10 Performance – part 1"	November 14, 2015	Saturday 9:30 p.m.	15.4%	#2	#6	19.5%	#1	#5	
20	"Week 10 Performance – part 2"	November 15, 2015	Sunday 9:15 p.m.	15.6%	#2	#6	18.5%	#3	#8	
21	"Week 11 Performance – part 1"	November 21, 2015	Saturday 9:30 p.m.	15.4%	#2	#6	18.1%	#1	#8	
22	"Week 11 Performance – part 2"	November 22, 2015	Sunday 9:15 p.m.	13.3%	#3	#8	14.7%	#3	#9	
23	"Week 12 Performance – part 1"	November 28, 2015	Sunday 9:30 p.m.	13.6%	#1	#6	13.8%	#1	#8	
24	"Week 12 Performance – part 2"	November 29, 2015	Sunday 9:15 p.m.	16.3%	#3	#5	16.3%	#3	#9	
25	"Week 13 Performance – part 1"	December 5, 2015	Sunday 9:30 p.m.	15.0%	#2	#7	16.6%	#1	#7	
26	"Week 13 Performance – part 2"	December 6, 2015	Sunday 9:15 p.m.	15.1%	#2	#6	16.3%	#3	#10	
27	"Finale: The Grand Showdown – part 1"	December 12, 2015	Saturday 9:30 p.m.	28.3%	#6	#9	31.7%	#3	#5	
28	"Finale: The Grand Showdown (Results) – part 2"	December 13, 2015	Sunday 9:15 p.m.	28.8%	#4	#6	32.2%	#5	#7	
