= Aegis (band) =

Filipino rock band

- Origin: Quezon City, Philippines
- Genres: Rock; pop rock
- Years active: 1995–present
- Labels: Alpha Music Corporation; Star Music
- Members: Juliet Sunot; Ken Sunot; Rey Abenoja; Stella Pabico; Rowena Adriano; Vilma Goloviogo
- Past members: Mercy Sunot

Aegis is a Filipino rock band formed in 1995. The band is composed of sisters Juliet and Ken Sunot on lead vocals, only-male member Rey Abenoja on vocals and guitar, Stella Pabico on keyboards, Rowena Adriano on bass guitar and Vilma Goloviogo on drums. Mercy Sunot was a member up until her death in November 2024. Formerly known as AG's Soundtrippers in clubs and lounges all over Japan, the group changed its name to Aegis (which means "shield" or "protection") upon signing with Alpha Records in 1998.

The band's songs were featured in the musical Rak of Aegis.

== History ==
The band began in 1995 from a group of entertainers from different bands based in Japan under AG Talent Development and Management, namely the sisters Juliet and Mercy Sunot, Stella Pabico, Vilma Goloviogo, Rowena "Weng" Adriano and Rey Abenoja. Initially named AG's Soundtrippers after the initials of their manager, the group was renamed to Aegis by their manager following their signing with Alpha Records in 1998, when they returned to the Philippines to record their debut album Halik. In 2011, a third Sunot sibling, Ken, joined the group. Abenoja's brother, Celso, served as the group's main composer until his death in 2007. Celso Abenoja suggested the band's name and wrote some of its original songs based on lyrics he had created in the 1980s.

== Band members ==
Current

- Juliet Sunot – lead vocals (1995–present)
- Ken Sunot – lead vocals (2011–present)
- Stella Pabico – keyboards (1995–present)
- Rey Abenoja – vocals, lead guitar (1995–present)
- Rowena Adriano – bass guitar (1995–present)
- Vilma Goloviogo – drums (1995–present)

Former

- Mercy Sunot – lead vocals (1995–2024; her death)

== Accolades ==
Award	Year	Category	Recipient(s)	Result	Ref.
Aliw Awards	2017	Best Major Concert	Aegis na Aegis: A Story of Us	Won	

== Discography ==
=== Studio albums ===
Year	Album	Label
1998	Halik (quadruple platinum)	Alpha Music
1999	Mahal na Mahal Kita (double platinum)	Alpha Music
2000	Paskung-Pasko	Alpha Music
2001	Awit at Pag-ibig	Alpha Music
2002	Ating Balikan	Alpha Music
2003	Muling Balikan	Alpha Music
2003	Ating Sayawin	Alpha Music
2004	Sino Ako?	Alpha Music
2006	Aegis: Greatest Hits	Alpha Music
2009	Back to Love	Alpha Music
2012	Mga Himig Ng Pag-Asa	Alpha Music
2014	Aegis: Greatest Hits, Vol. 2	
2018	AEGIS 20 & Beyond: Sa Ikalawang Dekada ng Musika Natin	

=== Singles ===
- "Ang sa Iyo ay Akin" (2021)
- "Sa Huling Pag-Uwi Mo" (2025)
