= Newport Performing Arts Theater =

Arts center in Pasay, Philippines

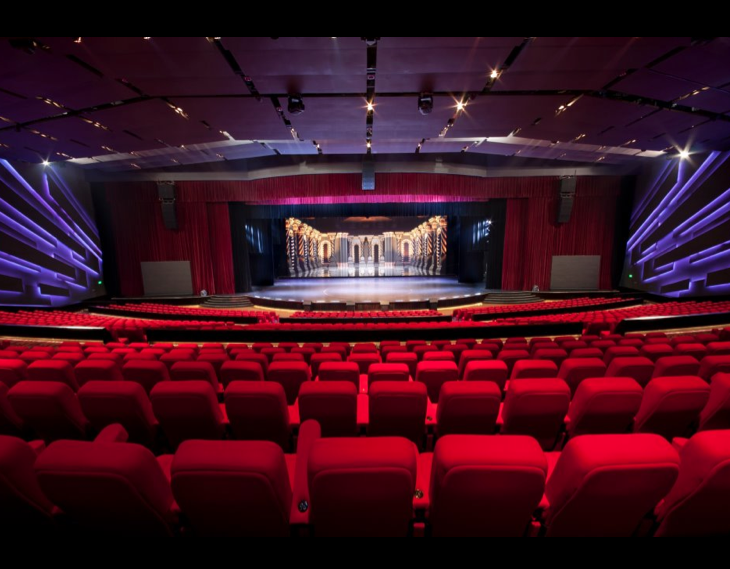
- The amphitheater in 2019
- Interactive map of Newport Performing Arts Theater
- Location: Newport World Resorts, Pasay, Philippines
- Coordinates: 14°31′8″N 121°1′11″E
- Operator: Travellers International Hotel Group, Inc.
- Capacity: 1,710

Construction
- Opened: November 25, 2010; 15 years ago
- Architects: Joseph Sy & Associates

The Newport Performing Arts Theater (NPAT), also known as simply Newport Theater, is a performing arts center on the grounds of Newport World Resorts in Pasay, Metro Manila, Philippines. It is a modern multi-purpose theater named after its location in the Newport Mall and entertainment complex connected to the integrated resort in the 25-hectare (62-acre) Newport City township. The 1,500-seat facility opened in 2010 and holds the widest stage in the Philippines. It is one of the three major performing arts venues in Metro Manila that plays host to both touring and locally-produced musicals, live stage shows, concerts, and regular televised events such as awards ceremonies and pageants.

== Facility ==
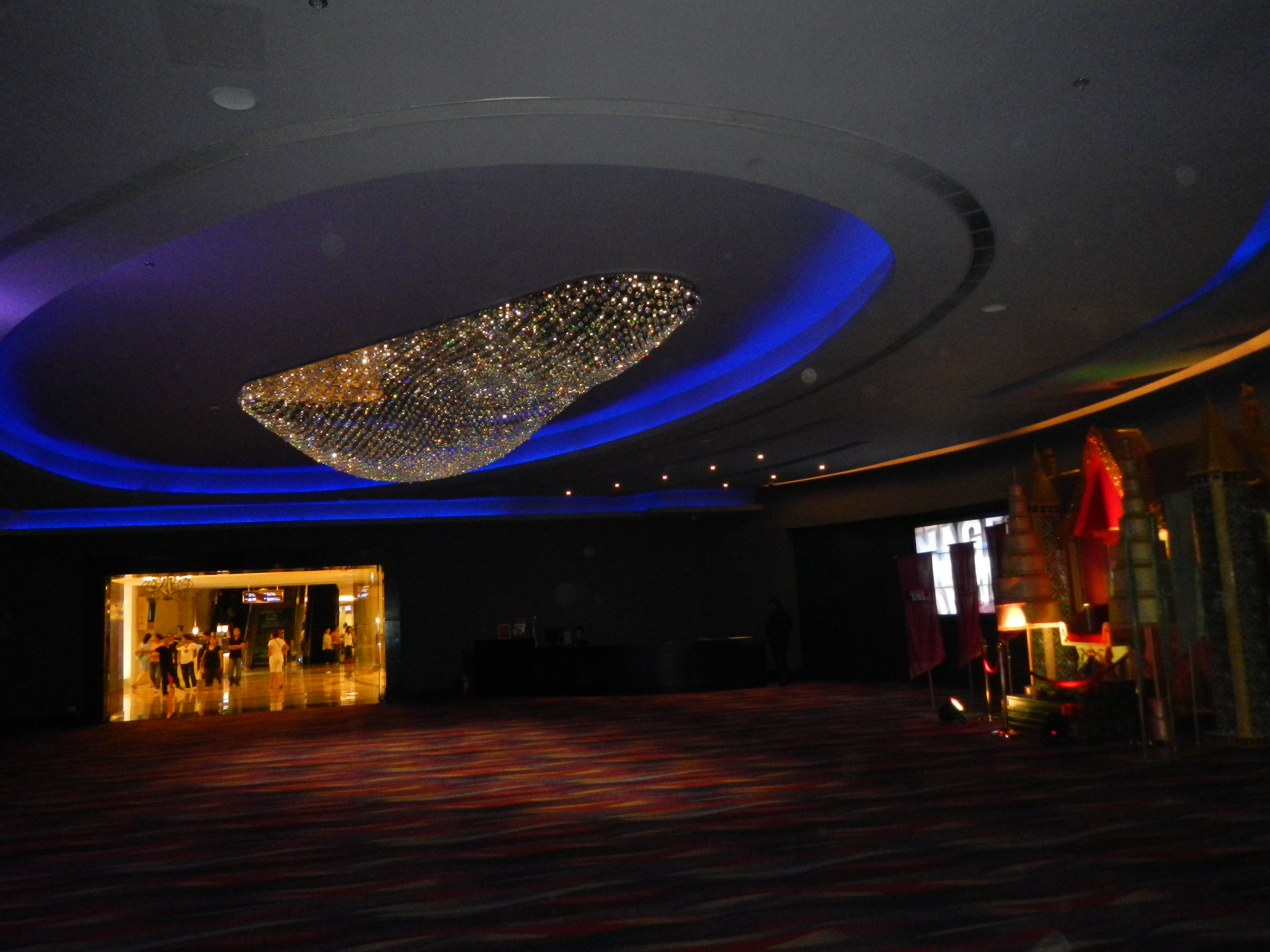
Newport Mall vestibule

The theater was inaugurated in November 2010 a year after the Newport Mall opened on August 28, 2009. It was designed by Joseph Sy & Associates of Hong Kong and won Perspective Awards-Certificate of Excellence and the Asia Pacific Interior Design Silver Award in 2011, as well as Best Theatrical Venue from BroadwayWorld Philippines in 2012. It features an elegant vestibule adorned by crystal chandeliers which was designed by Filipino sculptor Impy Pilapil.

The theater houses 1,500 of orchestra, balcony and premiere seats in an amphitheater-style arrangement with wide sloping corridors for ease of access. It has the widest stage of all the performing arts venues in the country and also features a revolving stage. It is home to one of the largest LED walls in Southeast Asia. In addition to the gigantic LED screen used for video backdrops, the theater is also equipped with two Euro-LED screens with 3D effects, 26 fly lines, and intelligent lighting consisting of 87 moving heads and 311 conventional, strobe and follow spots.

== Major productions ==
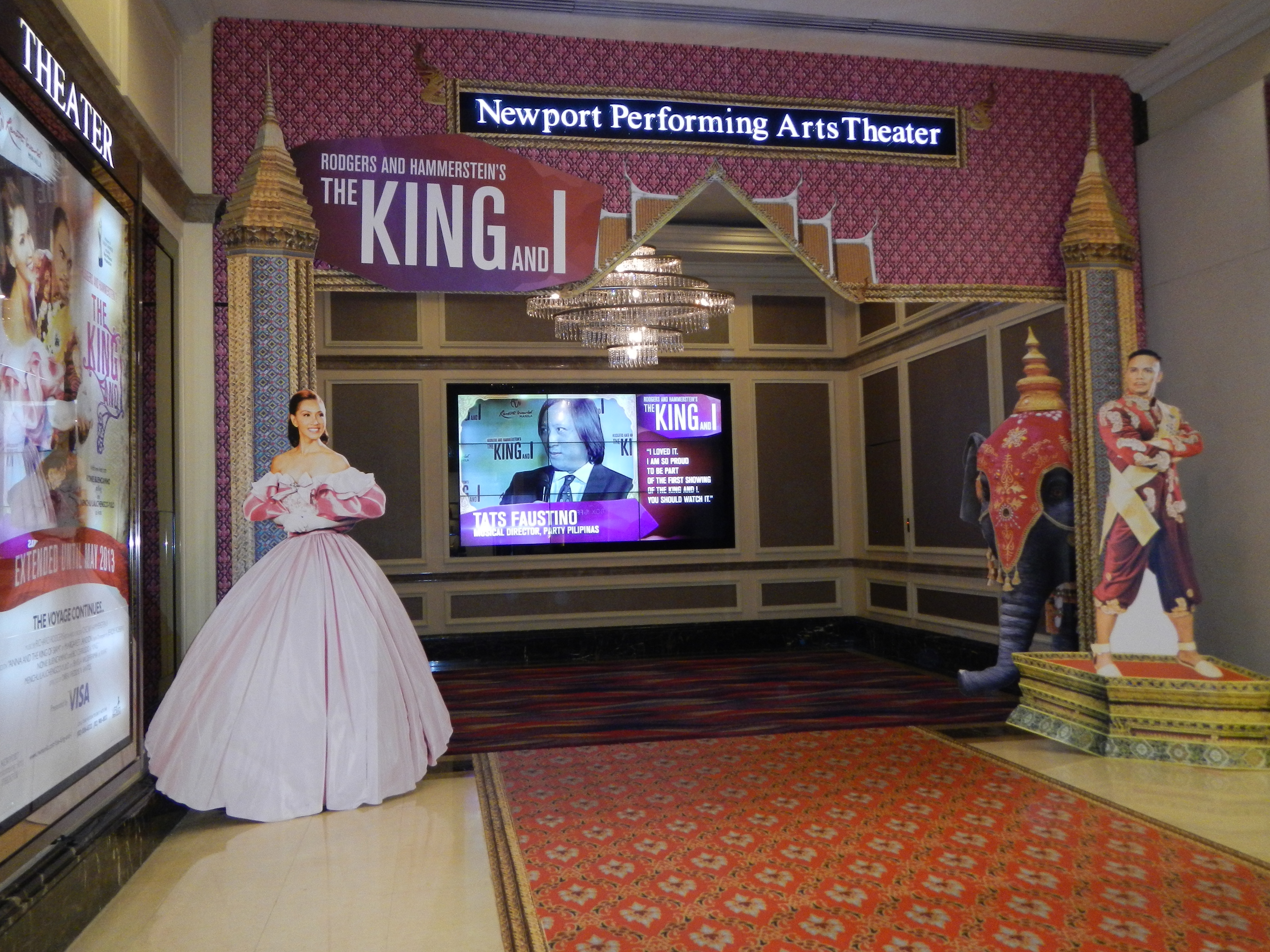
2013 production of The King and I at the Newport Performing Arts Theater

- Bongga Ka 'Day The Musical (2020)
- Ang Huling El Bimbo The Musical (2018–2019)
- All Out of Love (2018)
- Chitty Chitty Bang Bang (2017)
- PAW Patrol Live! (2017, original venue but was moved to the Smart Araneta Coliseum due to the attacks)
- Annie (2016)
- Bituing Walang Ningning The Musical (2015)
- Priscilla, Queen of the Desert (2014)
- Cinderella (2013)
- The King and I (2012–2013)
- The Sound of Music (2011–2012)
- Kaos (2010–2011)

The theater also plays host to The Voice of the Philippines, Pinoy Big Brother, the finale of Your Face Sounds Familiar seasons 1 and 2, the finale of Your Face Sounds Familiar Kids season 1, the finale of Tawag ng Tanghalan season 1, and Idol Philippines. The theater also hosted Banana Split: 7th Bananaversary on October 17 and 24, 2015, and the 24th Asian Television Awards in January 2020.
