= Your Face Sounds Familiar (Philippine TV series) season 4 =

Your Face Sounds Familiar
- Season 4
- Official poster featuring the entire cast
- Hosted by: Vhong Navarro; Jhong Hilario
- Judges: Gary Valenciano; Ogie Alcasid; Sharon Cuneta
- Winner: JMielle
- Runner-up: Alexa Ilacad
- Finals venue: Studio 10, ABS-CBN Broadcasting Center, Diliman, Quezon City
- Companion show: KaFamiliar Online Live
- No. of episodes: 55

Release
- Original network: Kapamilya Channel
- Original release: October 4, 2025 – April 12, 2026

Season chronology
- ← Previous; Season 3

The fourth season of the singing impersonation competition Your Face Sounds Familiar premiered on Kapamilya Channel on October 4, 2025. Vhong Navarro and Jhong Hilario debuted as hosts for this season, while Gary Valenciano, Ogie Alcasid, and Sharon Cuneta all returned to serve as members of the jury. The season introduced a number of format twists and extended the round duration to two weeks, a deviation from previous seasons.

The season ended on April 12, 2026, after 55 episodes and 12 rounds, the longest run in the show's history. JMielle, a singing duo consisting of JM Dela Cerna and Marielle Montellano, was named the winner at the season finale after obtaining a final score of 94.00%.

== Format ==
The show follows a competition where celebrity performers are tasked to impersonate any icon, living or dead, regardless of their age, race or gender. A three-person jury ranks the contestants, with their cumulative points being combined with points given by the performers amongst themselves to determine a winner for that round. For this season, the duration of each round runs for two weekends, deviating from the one-weekend duration of each round in the previous seasons.

=== Twists ===
The season introduced a variety of twists for the format, including the following:

- Steal – Based on "Te lo robo" from the original Spanish version of the format, the Steal allows a performer to take another performer’s assigned icon for the following week by pressing the red button during the Iconizer segment.
- Battle of One Icon — Two or more celebrity performers are assigned to impersonate the same icon while performing different songs.

== Contestants ==
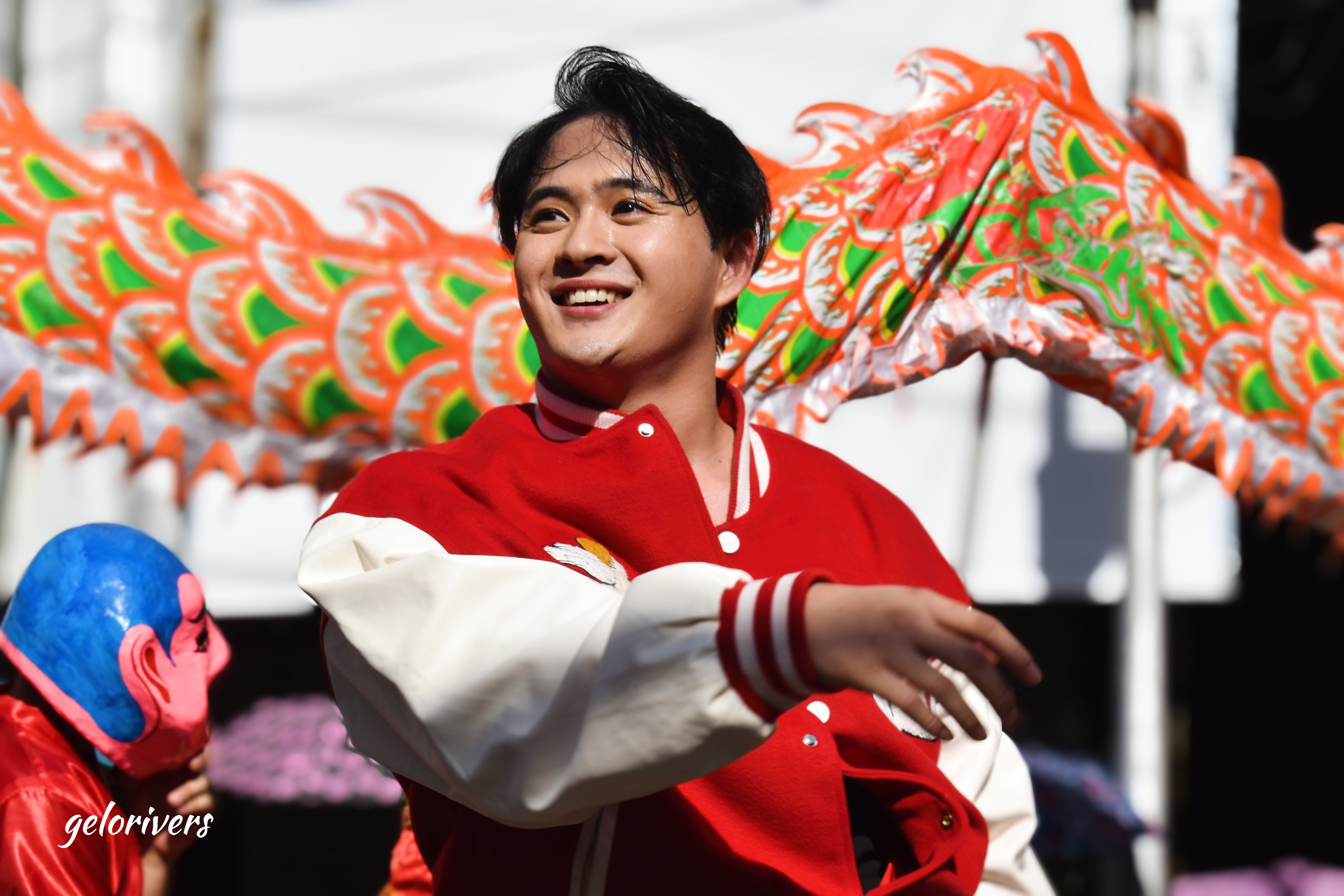
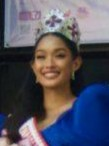
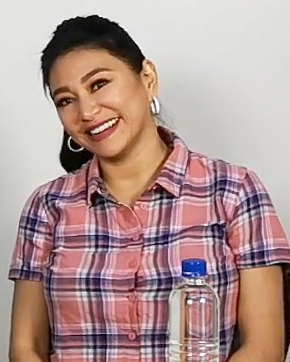
From left to right: Akira Morishita, Dia Maté, Rufa Mae Quinto

The eight contestants were first teased on September 24, 2025, and were revealed two days later on September 26.

Pepe Herrera withdrew from the competition on Episode 13 (November 15) for health-related reasons.

Celebrity performers of Your Face Sounds Familiar 4
Contestant	Notability	Result
JMielle (JM Dela Cerna & Marielle Montellano)	Singers	Winner (3 wins, 242 points)
Alexa Ilacad	Singer, actress, and host	Second Place (3 wins, 271 points)
Jason Dy	Singer	Third Place (2 wins, 229 points)
Akira Morishita	Member of BGYO	Fourth Place (1 win, 153 points)
Jarlo Bâse	Singer-songwriter	Fifth Place (1 win, 150 points)
Rufa Mae Quinto	Actress and comedienne	Sixth Place (1 win, 116 points)
Dia Maté	Singer and Reina Hispanoamericana 2025	Seventh Place (1 win, 107 points)
Pepe Herrera	Theater actor and comedian	Withdrew (0 wins, 49 points)

== Results summary ==
Legend

- Winner
- Runner-up
- Third place
- Fourth place
- Fifth place
- Sixth place
- Seventh place
- Final total points
- Contestant won that particular week
- Contestant placed last that particular week
- Contestant was not able to perform that particular week
- Contestant withdrew from the competition

Contestant	Round 1	Round 2	Round 3	Round 4	Round 5	Round 6	Round 7	Round 8	Round 9	Round 10	Round 11	Round 12	Final Total Points	Finals
JMielle	1st 33 points	2nd 24 points	3rd 21 points	4th 12 points	1st 36 points	2nd 18 points	1st 24 points	3rd 17 points	3rd 17 points	6th 5 points	2nd 20 points	3rd–4th 15 points	2nd 242 points	Winner; 94.00%
Alexa	5th 14 points	3rd 21 points	2nd 27 points	1st 36 points	2nd 21 points	5th 14 points	4th 7 points	2nd 21 points	2nd 21 points	3rd–4th 16 points	1st 37 points	1st 36 points	1st 271 points	2nd Place; 93.50%
Jason	2nd 27 points	1st 33 points	4th–5th 15 points	2nd 21 points	4th 12 points	4th 16 points	2nd 22 points	4th 13 points	4th 12 points	1st 29 points	4th 14 points	3rd–4th 15 points	3rd 229 points	3rd Place; 86.50%
Akira	4th 16 points	4th 17 points	7th 6 points	5th 9 points	7th 3 points	3rd 17 points	6th 5 points	1st 34 points	5th 10 points	3rd–4th 16 points	3rd 16 points	7th 4 points	4th 153 points	4th Place; 73.80%
Jarlo	6th–8th 7 points	8th 5 points	1st 33 points	3rd 15 points	3rd 18 points	7th 3 points	3rd 17 points	7th 3 points	7th 5 points	2nd 25 points	5th 9 points	5th 10 points	5th 150 points	5th Place; 65.80%
Rufa Mae	6th–8th 7 points	6th 10 points	6th 10 points	6th 8 points	5th 9 points	6th 8 points	Could Not; Perform	6th 6 points	1st 33 points	7th 4 points	7th 3 points	2nd 18 points	6th 116 points	6th Place; 61.70%
Dia	6th–8th 7 points	7th 9 points	8th 5 points	7th 4 points	6th 6 points	1st 29 points	5th 6 points	5th 11 points	6th 7 points	5th 10 points	6th 6 points	6th 7 points	7th 107 points	7th Place; 49.20%
Pepe	3rd 21 points	5th 13 points	4th–5th 15 points	Withdrew									8th 49 points	Withdrew (Round 4)

== Performances ==
The eight performances are divided into four nights over two weeks, with one to three contestants performing each episode, unlike in previous seasons, where four or five performed on the Saturday episode, with the remaining on Sundays. The winner of the round receives a cash prize of ₱50,000.

Color key

- Contestant won that particular week
- Contestant placed last that particular week

=== Round 1 (October 4, 5, 11, & 12) ===
Non-competition performance

- Jhong Hilario and Vhong Navarro as Michael Jackson and Justin Timberlake – "Love Never Felt So Good"

Episode Hashtag

- #YFSFIsBack (October 4)
- #YFSFKaFace (October 5)
- #YFSFKaSound (October 11)
- #YFSF1stWinner (October 12)

Episode	Order	Contestant	Performance	Points				Total	Rank
Episode	Order	Contestant	Performance	Gary	Sharon	Ogie	Others	Total	Rank
Episode 1 (October 4)	1	Alexa Ilacad	Chappell Roan – "Pink Pony Club"	5	4	5	0	14	5th
Episode 1 (October 4)	2	Jason Dy	Erik Santos – "Pagbigyang Muli"	8	8	8	3 (Note: 3 points from JMielle)	27	2nd
Episode 2 (October 5)	3	Dia Maté	Tyla – "Water"	3	2	2	0	7	6th–8th
Episode 2 (October 5)	4	JMielle	Andrea Bocelli and Celine Dion – "The Prayer"	6	6	6	15 (Note: 3 points each from Alexa, Jason, Dia, Jarlo, and Pepe)	33	1st
Episode 2 (October 5)	5	Akira Morishita	Jung Kook – "Seven"	4	5	4	3 (Note: 3 points from Rufa Mae)	16	4th
Episode 3 (October 11)	6	Rufa Mae Quinto	Vice Ganda – "Rampa"	2	1	1	3 (Note: 3 points from Akira)	7	6th–8th
Episode 3 (October 11)	7	Jarlo Bâse	Usher – "DJ Got Us Fallin' in Love"	1	3	3	0	7	6th–8th
Episode 4 (October 12)	8	Pepe Herrera	Maki – "Namumula"	7	7	7	0	21	3rd

Contestant pointing

=== Round 2 (October 18, 19, 25, & 26) ===
Gary Valenciano was not present for the entire round, while Sharon Cuneta was only present in Episodes 5 and 6.

Guest jurors

- Nyoy Volante and Klarisse de Guzman (substitutes for Gary Valenciano throughout the round and Sharon Cuneta for Episodes 5 and 6)

Episode Hashtag

- #YFSFKabog (October 18)
- #YFSFHaveFun (October 19)
- #YFSFTransform (October 25)
- #YFSF2ndWinner (October 26)

Episode	Order	Contestant	Performance	Points				Total	Rank
Episode	Order	Contestant	Performance	Nyoy	Klarisse	Ogie	Others	Total	Rank
Episode 5 (October 18)	1	Pepe Herrera	Steven Tyler of Aerosmith – "Cryin'"	4	4	5	0	13	5th
Episode 5 (October 18)	2	Dia Maté	Maymay Entrata – "Amakabogera"	2	1	3	3 (Note: 3 points from Rufa Mae)	9	7th
Episode 6 (October 19)	3	Rufa Mae Quinto	Cyndi Lauper – "Girls Just Want to Have Fun"	3	3	1	3 (Note: 3 points from Jason)	10	6th
Episode 6 (October 19)	4	Jarlo Bâse	Jay R – "Sining"	1	2	2	0	5	8th
Episode 7 (October 25)	5	Alexa Ilacad	Connie Francis – "Pretty Little Baby"	6	6	6	3 (Note: 3 points from Akira)	21	3rd
Episode 7 (October 25)	6	JMielle	Lady Gaga and Bradley Cooper – "Shallow"	7	7	7	3 (Note: 3 points from Pepe)	24	2nd
Episode 7 (October 25)	7	Akira Morishita	Harry Styles – "Sign of the Times"	5	5	4	3 (Note: 3 points from Alexa)	17	4th
Episode 8 (October 26)	8	Jason Dy	Sam Smith – "Dancing with a Stranger"	8	8	8	9 (Note: 3 points each from Dia, Jarlo, and JMielle)	33	1st

Contestant pointing

=== Round 3 (November 1, 2, 8, & 9) ===
For this round, Pepe used his power to steal Juan Karlos Labajo from Dia, who pressed again and received Adam Levine as her new icon. JMielle were assigned the icons Regine Velasquez and Ogie Alcasid, performing "Hanggang Ngayon". However, due to Marielle's illness, JM proceeded with the performance solo, impersonating Alcasid only with an alternative song while Velasquez icon was ultimately used by Katrina Velarde as solo guest performance.

Guest jurors

- Nyoy Volante and Klarisse de Guzman (substitutes for Gary Valenciano)

Episode Hashtag

- #YFSFBloom (November 1)
- #YFSFSweet (November 2)
- #YFSFPuso (November 8)
- #YFSF3rdWinner (November 9)

Episode	Order	Contestant	Performance	Points				Total	Rank
Episode	Order	Contestant	Performance	Nyoy & Klarisse	Sharon	Ogie	Others	Total	Rank
Episode 9 (November 1)	1	Jason Dy	Frank Sinatra – "New York, New York"	4	4	4	3 (Note: 3 points from Rufa Mae)	15	4th–5th
Episode 9 (November 1)	2	Rufa Mae Quinto	Miley Cyrus – "Flowers"	1	3	3	3 (Note: 3 points from Dia)	10	6th
Episode 10 (November 2)	3	Dia Maté	Adam Levine of Maroon 5 – "Sugar"	3	1	1	0	5	8th
Episode 10 (November 2)	4	Pepe Herrera	Juan Karlos Labajo – "Ere"	5	5	5	0	15	4th–5th
Episode 11 (November 8)	5	Alexa Ilacad	Jennie – "Like Jennie"	8	8	8	3 (Note: 3 points from Jarlo)	27	2nd
Episode 11 (November 8)	6	Jarlo Bâse	Jericho Rosales – "Pusong Ligaw"	6	6	6	15 (Note: 3 points each from Pepe, Alexa, JM, Akira, and Jason)	33	1st
Episode 11 (November 8)	7	Akira Morishita	Charlie Puth – "One Call Away"	2	2	2	0	6	7th
Episode 12 (November 9)	8	JM Dela Cerna	Ogie Alcasid – "Ikaw Sana"	7	7	7	0	21	3rd

Contestant pointing

=== Round 4 (November 15, 16, 22, & 23) ===
This round marked the first implementation of the Battle of One Icon format, with both Alexa and Jason impersonating Britney Spears. JMielle were assigned the icons Dolly Parton and Kenny Rogers, performing "Islands in the Stream". However, due to Marielle's continued absence, JM proceeded with the performance solo, impersonating Rogers only with another song.

Pepe withdrew from the competition at the start of this round due to health-related concerns, leaving the show with 49 points and without weekly wins. For this week, he was assigned Vhong Navarro with the song "Mr. Suave".

Non-competition performance

- Marko Rudio as Yoyoy Villame – "Magellan" (November 23)

Guest jurors

- Nyoy Volante and Klarisse de Guzman (substitutes for Gary Valenciano)

Episode Hashtag

- #YFSFHeartAndBeat (November 15)
- #YFSFPopAndSoul (November 16)
- #YFSFBattleOf1Icon (November 22)
- #YFSF4thWinner (November 23)

Episode	Order	Contestant	Performance	Points				Total	Rank
Episode	Order	Contestant	Performance	Nyoy & Klarisse	Sharon	Ogie	Others	Total	Rank
Episode 13 (November 15)	1	Rufa Mae Quinto	Moira Dela Torre – "Paubaya"	1	2	2	3 (Note: 3 points from Jarlo)	8	6th
Episode 13 (November 15)	2	Akira Morishita	Gloc-9 – "Sumayaw Ka"	3	3	3	0	9	5th
Episode 14 (November 16)	3	Alexa Ilacad	Britney Spears – "I'm a Slave 4 U"	7	7	7	15 (Note: 3 points each from Dia, Rufa Mae, JM, Akira, and Jason)	36	1st
Episode 14 (November 16)	4	Jarlo Bâse	John Legend – "All of Me"	5	5	5	0	15	3rd
Episode 15 (November 22)	5	Jason Dy	Britney Spears – "Toxic"	6	6	6	3 (Note: 3 points from Alexa)	21	2nd
Episode 15 (November 22)	6	JM Dela Cerna	Kenny Rogers – "Through the Years"	4	4	4	0	12	4th
Episode 15 (November 22)	7	Dia Maté	Billie Eilish – "Birds of a Feather"	2	1	1	0	4	7th

Contestant pointing

=== Round 5 (November 29, 30, December 6, & 7) ===
Non-competition performance

- Katrina Velarde as Regine Velasquez – "Narito Ako" (December 7)

Guest jurors

- Nyoy Volante and Klarisse de Guzman (substitutes for Gary Valenciano)

Episode Hashtag

- #YFSFied (November 29)
- #YFSFZoomIn (November 30)
- #YFSFDivine (December 6)
- #YFSF5thWinner (December 7)

Episode	Order	Contestant	Performance	Points				Total	Rank
Episode	Order	Contestant	Performance	Nyoy & Klarisse	Sharon	Ogie	Others	Total	Rank
Episode 17 (November 29)	1	JMielle	Ariana Grande and Cynthia Erivo – "Defying Gravity" (Note: JM performed as Erivo while Marielle performed as Grande.)	7	7	7	15 (Note: 3 points each from Dia, Jarlo, Alexa, Akira, and Jason)	36	1st
Episode 17 (November 29)	2	Akira Morishita	Tom Jones – "Sexbomb"	1	1	1	0	3	7th
Episode 18 (November 30)	3	Rufa Mae Quinto	Jessi – "Zoom"	3	3	3	0	9	5th
Episode 18 (November 30)	4	Jason Dy	Martin Nievera – "Kahit Isang Saglit"	4	4	4	0	12	4th
Episode 19 (December 6)	5	Dia Maté	Michelle Dee – "Reyna"	2	2	2	0	6	6th
Episode 19 (December 6)	6	Jarlo Bâse	Chris Martin of Coldplay – "A Sky Full of Stars"	5	5	5	3 (Note: 3 points from Rufa Mae)	18	3rd
Episode 19 (December 6)	7	Alexa Ilacad	Zsa Zsa Padilla – "Hiram"	6	6	6	3 (Note: 3 points from JMielle)	21	2nd

Contestant pointing

=== Round 6: Christmas Songs (December 13, 14, 20, & 21) ===
Non-competition performance

- Jona Viray as Mariah Carey – "All I Want for Christmas Is You" (December 21)

Episode Hashtag

- #YFSFPaskoFeels (December 13)
- #YFSFHolidaySurprise (December 14)
- #YFSFHoHoHo (December 20)
- #YFSF6thWinner (December 21)

Episode	Order	Contestant	Performance	Points				Total	Rank
Episode	Order	Contestant	Performance	Gary	Sharon	Ogie	Others	Total	Rank
Episode 21 (December 13)	1	JMielle	Jose Mari Chan and Liza Chan – "Christmas in Our Hearts"	5	6	7	0	18	2nd
Episode 21 (December 13)	2	Rufa Mae Quinto	Mercy Sunot of Aegis – "Christmas Bonus"	2	3	3	0	8	6th
Episode 22 (December 14)	3	Akira Morishita	Nick Carter of Backstreet Boys – "Last Christmas" (Note: During Akira's performance as Nick Carter of Backstreet Boys, his fellow BGYO members made a surprise appearance by performing alongside him. Gelo Rivera impersonated Kevin Richardson, JL Toreliza portrayed Howie Dorough, Mikki Claver took on the role of AJ McLean, and Nate Porcalla impersonated Brian Littrell.)	4	2	2	9 (Note: 3 points each from Dia, Rufa Mae, and Jarlo)	17	3rd
Episode 22 (December 14)	4	Dia Maté	Kylie Minogue – "Santa Baby"	7	5	5	12 (Note: 3 points each from Alexa, JMielle, Akira, and Jason)	29	1st
Episode 23 (December 20)	5	Jason Dy	Cher – "DJ Play a Christmas Song"	3	7	6	0	16	4th
Episode 23 (December 20)	6	Jarlo Bâse	Ariel Rivera – "Sana Ngayong Pasko"	1	1	1	0	3	7th
Episode 23 (December 20)	7	Alexa Ilacad	Kelly Clarkson – "Underneath the Tree"	6	4	4	0	14	5th

Contestant pointing

=== Round 7 (December 27, 28, January 3, & 4) ===
This round featured the second Battle of One Icon, with both Dia and Rufa Mae impersonating Jennifer Lopez. However, a medical emergency prevented the latter from proceeding with her performance, cancelling her performance of "On the Floor" which was ultimately performed by Awra Briguela in Round 10 as guest performance.

This round was the last to be aired on TV5, with episode 26 being the last episode to air on the network as the show moved to ALLTV beginning with episodes 27 and 28.

Non-competition performance

- Elha Nympha as Donna Summer – "Last Dance" (January 4)

Guest juror

- Erik Santos (substitute for Ogie Alcasid)

Episode Hashtag

- #YFSFHitmakers (December 27)
- #YFSFThankYou2025 (December 28)
- #YFSFHello2026 (January 3)
- #YFSF7thWinner (January 4)

Episode	Order	Contestant	Performance	Points				Total	Rank
Episode	Order	Contestant	Performance	Gary	Sharon	Erik	Others	Total	Rank
Episode 25 (December 27)	1	Dia Maté	Jennifer Lopez – "Papi"	1	3	2	0	6	5th
Episode 25 (December 27)	2	Jason Dy	Ed Sheeran – "Perfect"	4	4	5	9 (Note: 3 points each from Alexa, Jarlo, and JMielle)	22	2nd
Episode 26 (December 28)	3	JMielle	Justin Bieber and Nicki Minaj – "Beauty and a Beat"	6	6	6	6 (Note: 3 points each from Dia and Jason)	24	1st
Episode 26 (December 28)	4	Akira Morishita	Shawn Mendes – "Treat You Better"	2	2	1	0	5	6th
Episode 27 (January 3)	5	Jarlo Bâse	Amy Winehouse – "Rehab"	5	5	4	3 (Note: 3 points from Akira)	17	3rd
Episode 27 (January 3)	6	Alexa Ilacad	Sharon Cuneta – "Mr. DJ"	3	1	3	0	7	4th

Contestant pointing

=== Round 8 (January 10, 11, 17, & 18) ===
For this round, Alexa, who was assigned the icon Lisa, used her steal to swap icons with Akira, who was assigned to impersonate Yeng Constantino. Guest juror Erik Santos pressed the Iconizer button on behalf of Rufa Mae during her absence in Round 7.

During Alexa's performance in Episode 30, Enchong Dee appeared as a surprise guest, while Constantino was also present in the audience during her performance.

Non-competition performance

- Darren Espanto as Gary Valenciano – "Shout for Joy" (January 18)

Guest jurors

- Nyoy Volante and Klarisse de Guzman (substitutes for Gary Valenciano)

Episode Hashtag

- #YFSFSoulGood (January 10)
- #YFSFPopRock (January 11)
- #YFSFEnergy (January 17)
- #YFSF8thWinner (January 18)

Episode	Order	Contestant	Performance	Points				Total	Rank
Episode	Order	Contestant	Performance	Nyoy & Klarisse	Sharon	Ogie	Others	Total	Rank
Episode 29 (January 10)	1	Rufa Mae Quinto	Pink – "So What"	2	2	2	0	6	6th
Episode 29 (January 10)	2	JMielle	Janno Gibbs and Jaya – "Ikaw Lamang"	5	6	6	0	17	3rd
Episode 30 (January 11)	3	Dia Maté	Doja Cat – "Woman"	4	4	3	0	11	5th
Episode 30 (January 11)	4	Alexa Ilacad	Yeng Constantino – "Chinito"	7	7	7	0	21	2nd
Episode 31 (January 17)	5	Jason Dy	Elvis Presley – "Hound Dog"	3	3	4	3 (Note: 3 points from Akira)	13	4th
Episode 31 (January 17)	6	Jarlo Bâse	Gary Valenciano – "Ililigtas Ka Niya"	1	1	1	0	3	7th
Episode 31 (January 17)	7	Akira Morishita	Lisa – "Money"	6	5	5	18 (Note: 3 points each from Alexa, Dia, Jarlo, Jason, JMielle, and Rufa Mae)	34	1st

Contestant pointing

=== Round 9 (January 24, 25, 31, & February 1) ===
For this round, Akira, who was assigned the icon Michael Bolton, used his steal to swap icons with Jason, who was assigned to impersonate James Reid.

Non-competition performance

- Karla Estrada as Lady Gaga – "Always Remember Us This Way" (January 24)

Guest jurors

- Klarisse de Guzman and Karla Estrada (substitutes for Sharon Cuneta and Ogie Alcasid)

Episode Hashtag

- #YFSFRemember (January 24)
- #YFSFPalagi (January 25)
- #YFSFGotYou (January 31)
- #YFSF9thWinner (February 1)

Episode	Order	Contestant	Performance	Points				Total	Rank
Episode	Order	Contestant	Performance	Gary	Klarisse	Karla	Others	Total	Rank
Episode 33 (January 24)	1	Akira Morishita	James Reid – "Randomantic"	3	3	4	0	10	5th
Episode 34 (January 25)	2	JMielle	KZ Tandingan and TJ Monterde – "Palagi"	6	6	5	0	17	3rd
Episode 34 (January 25)	3	Rufa Mae Quinto	Fergie – "Big Girls Don't Cry"	4	5	6	18 (Note: 3 points each from Akira, Alexa, Dia, Jarlo, Jason, and JMielle)	33	1st
Episode 35 (January 31)	4	Jarlo Bâse	Enrique Iglesias – "Bailamos"	2	2	1	0	5	7th
Episode 35 (January 31)	5	Dia Maté	Alicia Keys – "If I Ain't Got You"	1	1	2	3 (Note: 3 points from Rufa Mae)	7	6th
Episode 35 (January 31)	6	Jason Dy	Michael Bolton – "How Am I Supposed to Live Without You"	5	4	3	0	12	4th
Episode 36 (February 1)	7	Alexa Ilacad	Olivia Rodrigo – "Drivers License"	7	7	7	0	21	2nd

Contestant pointing

=== Round 10 (February 7, 8, 14, & 15) ===
Non-competition performance

- Awra Briguela as Jennifer Lopez – "On the Floor" (February 15)

Episode Hashtag

- #YFSFRockOn (February 7)
- #YFSFWeWant (February 8)
- #YFSFILike (February 14)
- #YFSF10thWinner (February 15)

Episode	Order	Contestant	Performance	Points				Total	Rank
Episode	Order	Contestant	Performance	Gary	Sharon	Ogie	Others	Total	Rank
Episode 37 (February 7)	1	Alexa Ilacad	Avril Lavigne – "Girlfriend"	4	4	5	3 (Note: 3 points from Rufa Mae)	16	3rd–4th
Episode 37 (February 7)	2	Rufa Mae Quinto	Kitchie Nadal – "Huwag na Huwag Mong Sasabihin"	2	1	1	0	4	7th
Episode 38 (February 8)	3	Akira Morishita	Ricky Martin – "The Cup of Life"	5	5	3	3 (Note: 3 points from Jason)	16	3rd–4th
Episode 38 (February 8)	4	JMielle	Christina Aguilera and Sabrina Carpenter – "What a Girl Wants" (Note: JM performed as Carpenter while Marielle performed as Aguilera.)	1	2	2	0	5	6th
Episode 39 (February 14)	5	Jason Dy	Cardi B – "I Like It"	7	6	7	9 (Note: 3 points each from Alexa, Akira, and Jarlo)	29	1st
Episode 39 (February 14)	6	Dia Maté	Gwen Stefani – "Hollaback Girl"	3	3	4	0	10	5th
Episode 39 (February 14)	7	Jarlo Bâse	Vhong Navarro – "Totoy Bibo"	6	7	6	6 (Note: 3 points from Dia and JMielle)	25	2nd

Contestant pointing

=== Round 11 (February 21, 22, 28, & March 1) ===
For this round, Jason used his power to steal Benson Boone from Akira, who pressed again and received Axl Rose as his new icon.

Non-competition performance

- Sofronio Vasquez as Elvis Presley – "If I Can Dream" (March 1)

Episode Hashtag

- #YFSFDazzling (February 21)
- #YFSFAllAboutFun (February 22)
- #YFSFSoaferLatina (February 28)
- #YFSF11thWinner (March 1)

Episode	Order	Contestant	Performance	Points				Total	Rank
Episode	Order	Contestant	Performance	Gary	Sharon	Ogie	Others	Total	Rank
Episode 41 (February 21)	1	JMielle	Rod Stewart and Tina Turner – "Hot Legs" (Note: JM performed as Turner while Marielle performed as Stewart.)	7	7	6	0	20	2nd
Episode 41 (February 21)	2	Dia Maté	Marilyn Monroe – "Diamonds Are a Girl's Best Friend"	2	2	2	0	6	6th
Episode 42 (February 22)	3	Rufa Mae Quinto	Meghan Trainor – "All About That Bass"	1	1	1	0	3	7th
Episode 42 (February 22)	4	Jason Dy	Benson Boone – "Beautiful Things"	4	5	5	0	14	4th
Episode 43 (February 28)	5	Akira Morishita	Axl Rose of Guns N' Roses – "Sweet Child o' Mine"	5	4	4	3 (Note: 3 points from Alexa)	16	3rd
Episode 43 (February 28)	6	Jarlo Bâse	Bamboo Mañalac of Bamboo – "Tatsulok"	3	3	3	0	9	5th
Episode 43 (February 28)	7	Alexa Ilacad	Thalía – "Maria Mercedes"	6	6	7	18 (Note: 3 points each from Akira, Dia, Jarlo, Jason, JMielle, and Rufa Mae)	37	1st

Contestant pointing

=== Round 12 (March 7, 8, 14, & 15) ===
Guest juror

- Erik Santos (substitute for Gary Valenciano)

Non-competition performance

- Kai Montinola as Lea Salonga – "I'd Give My Life for You" (March 15)

Episode Hashtag

- #YFSFAllThisTime (March 7)
- #YFSFMyHero (March 8)
- #YFSFTodoNaTo (March 14)
- #YFSF12thWinner (March 15)

Episode	Order	Contestant	Performance	Points				Total	Rank
Episode	Order	Contestant	Performance	Erik	Sharon	Ogie	Others	Total	Rank
Episode 45 (March 7)	1	Dia Maté	Camila Cabello – "Havana"	2	4	1	0	7	6th
Episode 45 (March 7)	2	Rufa Mae Quinto	Tiffany Darwish – "All This Time"	3	3	6	6 (Note: 3 points each from Akira and Alexa)	18	2nd
Episode 46 (March 8)	3	Akira Morishita	Nick Jonas – "Jealous"	1	1	2	0	4	7th
Episode 46 (March 8)	4	JMielle	Luciano Pavarotti and Mariah Carey – "Hero"	4	6	5	0	15	3rd–4th
Episode 47 (March 14)	5	Alexa Ilacad	Rufa Mae Quinto – "Booba"	7	7	7	15 (Note: 3 points each from Dia, Jarlo, Jason, JMielle, and Rufa Mae)	36	1st
Episode 47 (March 14)	6	Jarlo Bâse	apl.de.ap of Black Eyed Peas – "The Apl Song"	5	2	3	0	10	5th
Episode 47 (March 14)	7	Jason Dy	Elton John – "Your Song"	6	5	4	0	15	3rd–4th

Contestant pointing

=== Round 13: "The Grand Showdown" (April 5, 11 & 12) ===
All seven remaining contestants perform in the grand showdown, which is pre-recorded for the first time in the show's history. For the round, the contestants select the icons they impersonate. The winner is determined by a composite score of the final total points accumulated throughout the competition and the jury's evaluation of their final performances. During this round, Sharon Cuneta was absent, and four guest jurors took her place. Without a public vote component, this finale is the first to have its outcome determined solely by the jury.

At the end of the round, JMielle narrowly defeated Alexa, the leader in the final tally of points, in the final score by a margin of 0.5%. They received a trophy and ₱1,000,000 in cash.

Guest jurors

- Klarisse de Guzman
- Karla Estrada
- Erik Santos
- Nyoy Volante

Guest appearance

- Pepe Herrera (April 11 & 12)

Non-competition performance

- Billy Crawford – "Bounce That" and "Bright Lights" (April 12)

Episode Hashtag

- #YFSFGrandShowdown (April 5)
- #YFSFFinalTransformation (April 11)
- #YFSF2026GrandWinner (April 12)

Episode	Order	Contestant	Performance	Total	Rank
Episode 53 (April 5)	1	Jason Dy	Beyoncé – "Crazy in Love"	86.50%	Third Place
Episode 53 (April 5)	2	Jarlo Bâse	Freddie Mercury of Queen – "Bohemian Rhapsody"	65.80%	Fifth Place
Episode 53 (April 5)	3	JMielle	Jennifer Holliday and Jessica Sanchez – "And I Am Telling You I'm Not Going" (Note: JM performed as Holliday while Marielle performed as Sanchez.)	94.00%	Winner
Episode 54 (April 11)	4	Alexa Ilacad	Shakira – "Whenever, Wherever"	93.50%	Second Place
Episode 54 (April 11)	5	Dia Maté	Rihanna – "Diamonds"	49.20%	Seventh Place
Episode 54 (April 11)	6	Akira Morishita	Justin Timberlake – "SexyBack"	73.80%	Fourth Place
Episode 55 (April 12)	7	Rufa Mae Quinto	Katy Perry – "Firework"	61.70%	Sixth Place

Special awards

- Jason Dy – The "Parrot Yarn?" Award
- Jarlo Bâse – The "Borta Babe" Award
- JMielle – The "Bakit Di na Lang Totohanin ang Lahat" Award
- Alexa Ilacad – The "Todo Na 'To!" Award
- Dia Maté – The "Plakadong Face Card" Award
- Akira Morishita – The "Boy Band Multiverse" Award
- Rufa Mae Quinto – The "Ultimate Good Vibes" Award

== Specials ==
Episodes 49 through 52 are special episodes collectively entitled "Road to the Grand Showdown," serving as a primer for the following round. The episodes feature the journeys of the celebrity performers through roundtable discussions among the contestants, behind-the-scenes clips, and select re-aired performances throughout the season. There was no episode aired on April 4, 2026, as programming was pre-empted by Black Saturday.

After the show concluded on April 12, 2026, it was re-aired again on April 18 and 19, 2026. However it was cut short after the premiere of the sixth season of Kapamilya, Deal or No Deal on April 25, 2026.

=== Week 25 (March 21 & 22) ===
Episode hashtag

- #YFSFJourney (Saturday)
- #YFSFIconicWins (Sunday)

Performances

Episode 49 (March 21)

- Akira Morishita as Lisa – "Money" (from Round 8)
- Alexa Ilacad as Rufa Mae Quinto – "Booba" (from Round 12)

Episode 50 (March 22)

- Dia Maté as Kylie Minogue – "Santa Baby" (from Round 6)
- Jarlo Bâse as Jericho Rosales – "Pusong Ligaw" (from Round 3)

=== Week 26 (March 28 & 29) ===
Episode hashtag

- #YFSFTopTransformations (Saturday)
- #YFSFRoadToFinale (Sunday)

Performances

Episode 51 (March 28)

- Jason Dy as Cardi B – "I Like It" (from Round 10)
- JMielle as Ariana Grande and Cynthia Erivo – "Defying Gravity" (from Round 5)

Episode 52 (March 29)

- Rufa Mae Quinto as Fergie – "Big Girls Don't Cry" (from Round 9)

== Production ==
=== Development ===
On August 14, 2025, ABS-CBN confirmed that Your Face Sounds Familiar will return for a fourth season at the "Iisang Tahanan: Kapamilya Forever Trade Launch".

=== Hosts and judges ===
The host and judges of Your Face Sounds Familiar 4

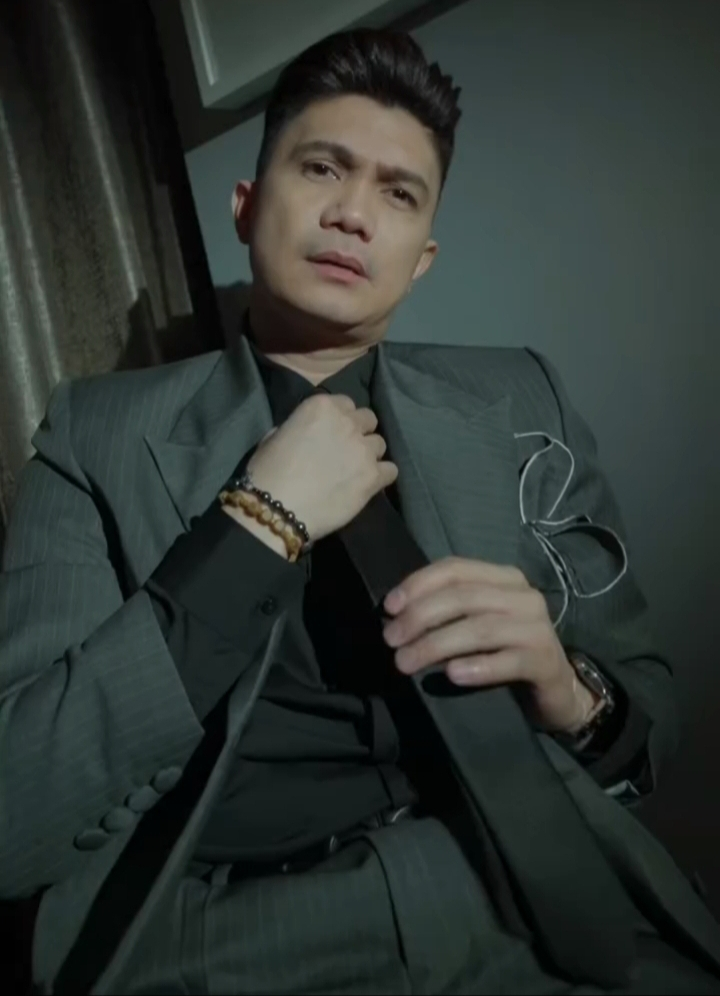
Vhong Navarro

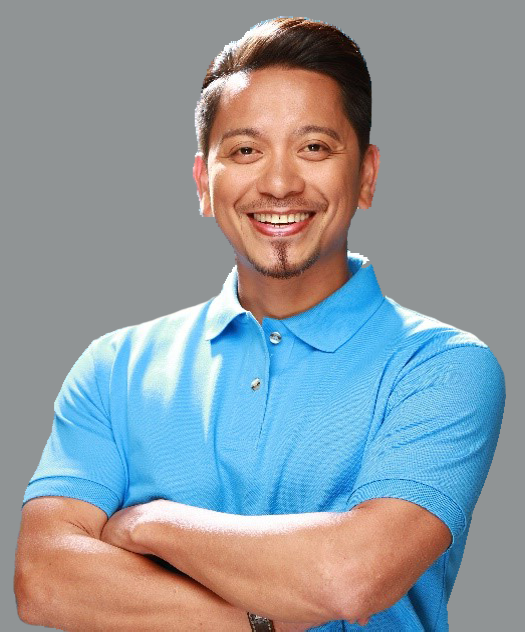
Jhong Hilario

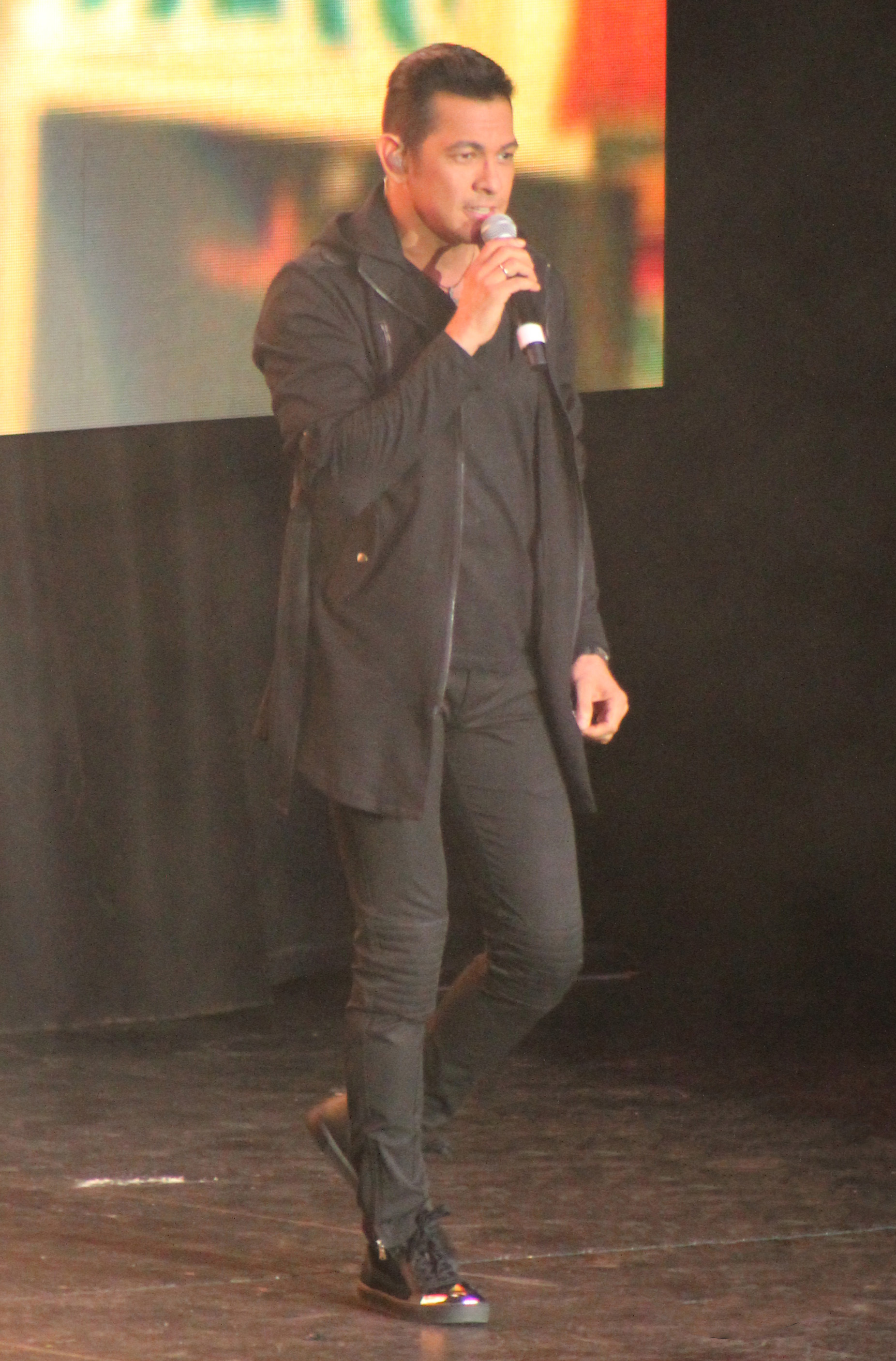
Gary Valenciano

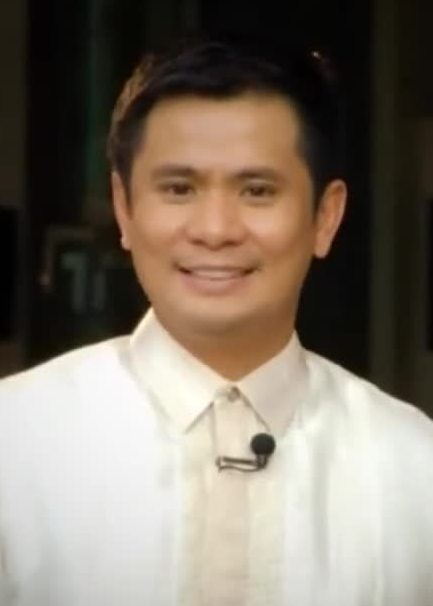
Ogie Alcasid

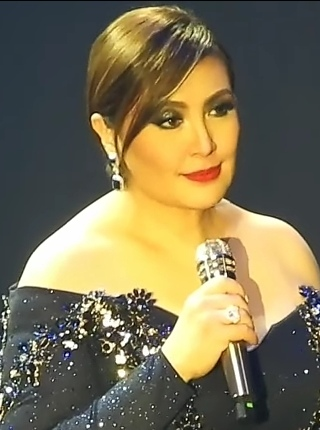
Sharon Cuneta

All of the judges from the previous season, Ogie Alcasid, Sharon Cuneta and Gary Valenciano returned to serve in the jury.

The season is hosted by Vhong Navarro and season 3 contestant Jhong Hilario, both of whom replace Luis Manzano, who left the show due to hosting commitments on other programs. To promote the season, Navarro and Hilario appeared as guest performers in the final episode of Idol Kids Philippines on September 28.

In the show's online companion show, KaFamiliar Online Live, season 3 contestant Vivoree Esclito, Kids season 2 contestant Krystal Brimner, and Showtime Online Ü host AC Soriano serve as hosts. Fellow Kids season 2 contestant and co-winner Mackie Empuerto of the TNT Boys and iWant ASAP host Jeremy G served as substitute online hosts for this season.

=== Mentors ===
Klarisse de Guzman, winner of season 3, and Nyoy Volante, runner-up of season 1, serve as mentors for the season for vocals and character and movement, respectively. The former replaced Jed Madela, joining the show for her first season as a mentor.

=== Guest judges ===
In certain weeks, guest judges substituted for members of the jury in their respective absences.

- Nyoy Volante (Valenciano's substitute judge for Round 2 and Rounds 3–5 and 8 alongside de Guzman)
- Klarisse de Guzman (Cuneta's substitute judge for Rounds 2 and 9, Valenciano's substitute judge for Rounds 3–5 and 8 alongside Volante)
- Erik Santos (Alcasid's substitute judge for Round 7, Valenciano's substitute judge for Round 12)
- Karla Estrada (Alcasid's substitute judge for Round 9)

== Broadcast ==
On January 2, 2026, the show and other remaining ABS-CBN programs airing on TV5 were transferred to AMBS' ALLTV, marking its return to channels 2 and 16 in Mega Manila and regional channels previously held by ABS-CBN until 2020. This occurred after TV5 Network's decision to terminate its content partnership deal with ABS-CBN, which effectively ceased broadcasting programs produced by the latter on TV5, due to financial disputes involving blocktime fees, which was subsequently settled.
