= Your Face Sounds Familiar Kids (Philippine TV series) season 1 =

Your Face Sounds Familiar Kids
- Season 1
- Hosted by: Billy Crawford
- Judges: Gary Valenciano; Sharon Cuneta; Ogie Alcasid
- Winner: Awra Briguela
- Runner-up: Elha Nympha
- Finals venue: Newport Performing Arts Theater, Resorts World Manila, Pasay, Philippines
- No. of episodes: 28

Release
- Original network: ABS-CBN; Yey! (Take 2, recap from previous week); The Filipino Channel (International broadcaster)
- Original release: January 7 – April 9, 2017

Season chronology
- Next → Season 2

The first season of Your Face Sounds Familiar Kids was a singing and impersonation competition for celebrity kids on ABS-CBN from January 7 to April 9, 2017, replacing Pinoy Boyband Superstar and was replaced by the first season of The Voice Teens. It is the first season of the kids version of the said competition. Gary Valenciano and Sharon Cuneta reprise their former duties, however this time, along with new jury Ogie Alcasid, who replaced Jed Madela for the third season. Billy Crawford also return as a host.

After 14 weeks, Awra Briguela emerged as the winner, garnering 95.41% of the public's votes.

On March 21, 2020, the show re-ran due to the Enhanced community quarantine in Luzon pre-empting all programming. However, the reruns were abruptly stopped after May 3, 2020, due to the temporary closure of ABS-CBN following the cease and desist order issued by the National Telecommunications Commission on account of its franchise expiration.

== Development ==
On August 15, 2016, Crawford announced that it will return for a third season; which was later revealed as the Kids edition entitled Your Face Sounds Familiar Kids during the Isang Pamilya Tayo Ngayong Pasko: The ABS-CBN Christmas Trade Event in November 2016.

On November 22, 2016, Ogie Alcasid, who made a comeback on ABS-CBN, was revealed as the newest addition to the show's judges, replacing Jed Madela. The Kids season premiered on January 7, 2017, taking over the time slot vacated by the then-recently concluded Pinoy Boyband Superstar.

On March 5, 2017, Xia Vigor was also unable to perform on that weekend due to her illness and sickness at the time of the episode taping. Her impersonation of Jennifer Lopez, originally slated for that week, took place on the following week instead.

On March 21, 2020, the show returned on air as part of the network's Luzon lockdown special programming, temporarily replacing the second season of The Voice Teens until the closure of ABS-CBN following the cease and desist order issued by the National Telecommunications Commission on account of its franchise expiration.

=== Prize ===
Every week, the winner will win a cash prize of 100,000 pesos, with half to be given to their chosen charity. The grand prize is 1 million pesos, a trip for four to South Korea and house and lot.

== Host, Judges and Mentors ==
The host and judges of Your Face Sounds Familiar

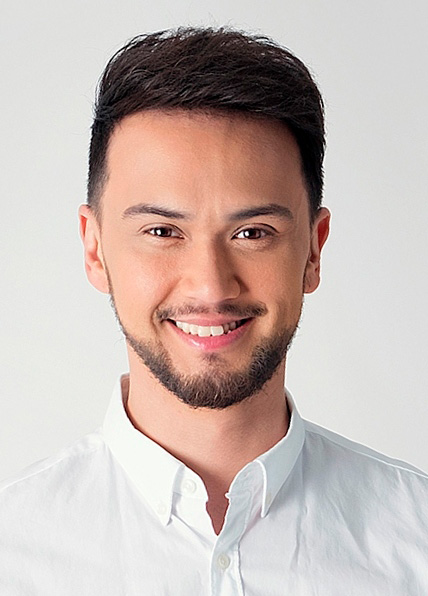
Billy Crawford

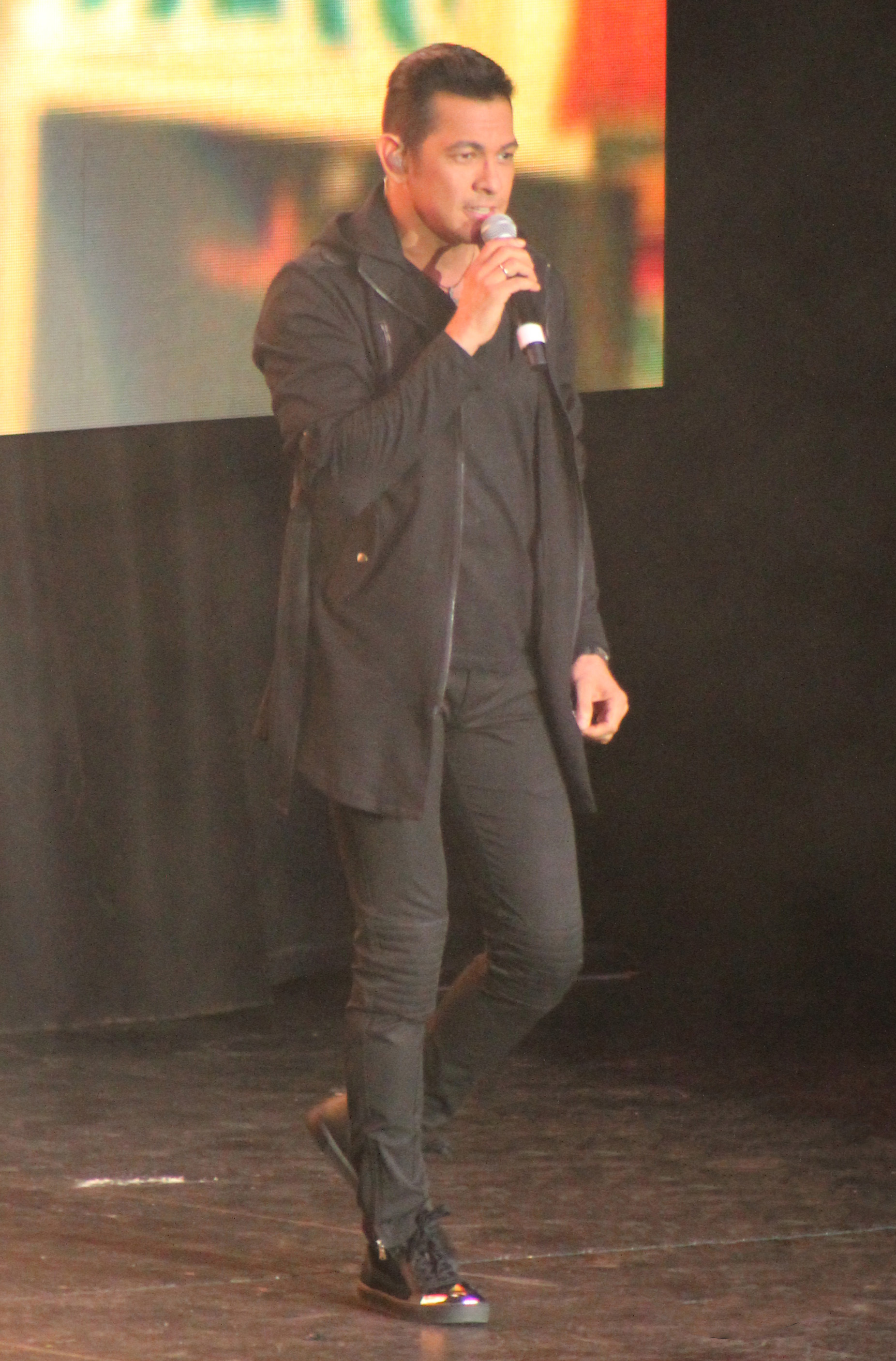
Gary Valenciano

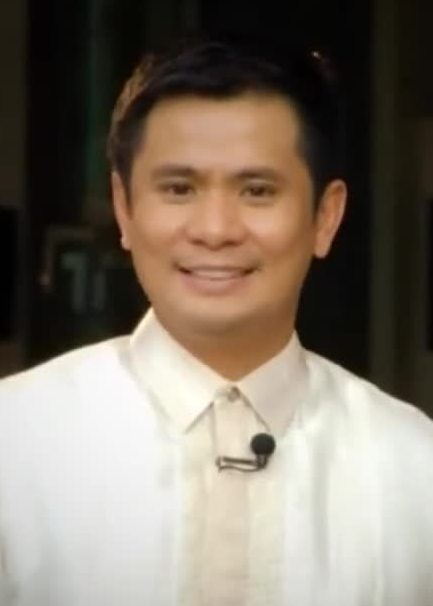
Ogie Alcasid

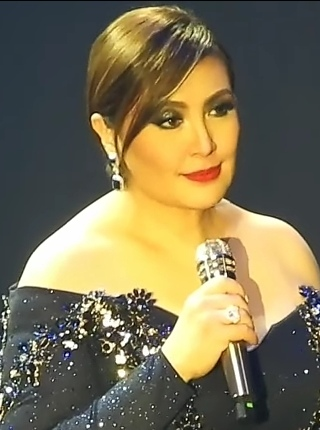
Sharon Cuneta

=== Host ===
Billy Crawford serves as the host of the local kids version of Your Face Sounds Familiar.

=== Judges ===
The judges, dubbed as "The Jury" in the show:

The Jury

- Ogie Alcasid
- Sharon Cuneta
- Gary Valenciano

=== Mentors ===
Annie Quintos of The Company served as the mentor for vocals while Georcelle Dapat of the G-Force served as the mentor for choreography and movement.

== Contestants ==
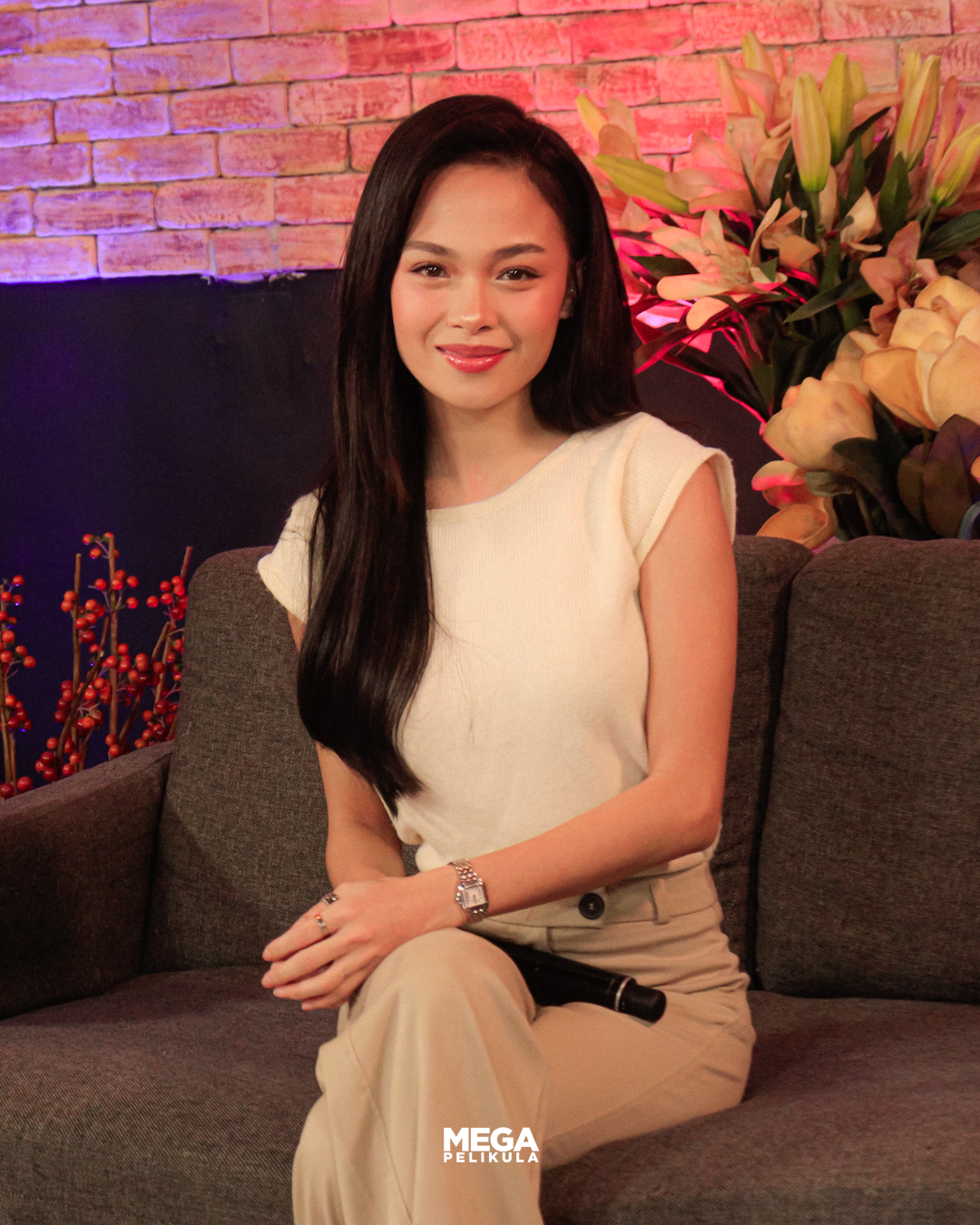
From center: AC Bonifacio

The following are participating performers for the competition. They were revealed during the ABS-CBN Trade Launch on November 22, 2016.

Celebrity performers of Your Face Sounds Familiar Kids 1
Contestant	Notability	Result
Awra Briguela	Child actor	Winner (1 win, 208 stars)
Elha Nympha	Singer	Second Place (3 wins, 229 stars)
AC Bonifacio	Dancer	Third Place (2 wins, 212 stars)
Justin Alva	Singer	Fourth Place (1 win, 204 stars)
Xia Vigor	Child actress	Fifth Place (1 win, 192 stars)
Sam Shoaf	Singer	Sixth Place (3 wins, 214 stars)
Lyca Gairanod	Singer	Seventh Place (1 win, 183 stars)
Alonzo Muhlach	Child actor	Eighth Place (1 win, 184 stars)

== Results summary ==
The table below shows the corresponding points earned each week. Unlike in the regular seasons, points are called stars instead, and instead of giving 3 points to other performers, the jury gives 4 stars to the lower ranked contestants.

Legend

- Winner
- Runner-up
- Third place
- Fourth place
- Fifth place
- Sixth place
- Seventh place
- Eighth place
- Final Total Stars
- Contestant won that particular week
- Contestant placed last that particular week
- Contestant was not able to perform that particular week

Contestant	Week 1	Week 2	Week 3	Week 4	Week 5	Week 6	Week 7	Week 8	Week 9	Week 10	Week 11	Week 12	Week 13	Final Total Stars	Finals
Awra	1st 24 stars	6th-8th 12 stars	2nd 20 stars	3rd-5th 15 stars	5th-8th 12 stars	4th 14 stars	4th 15 stars	4th 16 stars	3rd 17 stars	3rd 19 stars	5th 14 stars	4th 18 stars	7th/8th 12 stars	4th 208 stars	Winner; 95.41%
Elha	3rd 18 stars	1st 24 stars	3rd/4th 17 stars	6th 14 stars	5th-8th 12 stars	6th-8th 12 stars	2nd 21 stars	1st 24 stars	2nd 20 stars	1st 24 stars	3rd 17 stars	5th-8th 12 stars	5th 14 stars	1st 229 stars	2nd Place; 70.75%
AC	2nd 19 stars	2nd/3rd 18 stars	5th-8th 12 stars	3rd-5th 15 stars	5th-8th 12 stars	1st 24 stars	6th-8th 12 stars	5th-8th 12 stars	4th 16 stars	5th 13 stars	1st 24 stars	2nd 20 stars	4th 15 stars	3rd 212 stars	3rd Place; 57.95%
Justin	5th-8th 12 stars	2nd/3rd 18 stars	3rd/4th 17 stars	7th/8th 12 stars	4th 16 stars	3rd 19 stars	3rd 16 stars	5th-8th 12 stars	6th-7th 12 stars	4th 14 stars	2nd 20 stars	5th-8th 12 stars	1st 24 stars	5th 204 stars	4th Place; 54.91%
Xia	5th-8th 12 stars	4th/5th 15 stars	1st 24 stars	3rd-5th 15 stars	2nd/3rd 19 stars	6th-8th 12 stars	6th-8th 12 stars	2nd 21 stars	Could Not; Perform	6th-8th 12 stars	6th-8th 12 stars	3rd 19 stars	2nd 19 stars	6th 192 stars	5th Place; 48.92%
Sam	4th 17 stars	6th-8th 12 stars	5th-8th 12 stars	2nd 19 stars	1st 24 stars	2nd 20 stars	1st 24 stars	5th-8th 12 stars	6th-7th 12 stars	6th-8th 12 stars	6th-8th 12 stars	1st 21 stars	3rd 17 stars	2nd 214 stars	6th Place; 48.85%
Lyca	5th-8th 12 stars	6th-8th 12 stars	5th-8th 12 stars	1st 24 stars	5th-8th 12 stars	5th 13 stars	5th 14 stars	5th-8th 12 stars	5th 13 stars	2nd 20 stars	4th 15 stars	5th-8th 12 stars	7th/8th 12 stars	8th 183 stars	7th Place; 43.90%
Alonzo	5th-8th 12 stars	4th/5th 15 stars	5th-8th 12 stars	7th-8th 12 stars	2nd/3rd 19 stars	6th-8th 12 stars	6th-8th 12 stars	3rd 17 stars	1st 24 stars	6th-8th 12 stars	6th-8th 12 stars	5th-8th 12 stars	6th 13 stars	7th 184 stars	8th Place; 40.78%

== Performances ==
The eight performances are divided into two nights – four contestants perform during Saturdays and the remaining four during Sundays.

Color key

- Contestant won that particular week
- Contestant placed last that particular week

=== Week 1 (January 7 & 8) ===
Non-competition performance

- Ogie Alcasid as Annie - "Tomorrow"

Episode hashtag

- #YFSFKids (Saturday)
- #YFSFCuties (Sunday)

Order	Contestant	Performance	Stars				Rank
Order	Contestant	Performance	Ogie	Sharon	Gary	Total	Rank
1	Xia Vigor	Selena Gomez of Selena Gomez & the Scene – "Love You Like a Love Song"	4	4	4	12	5th-8th
2	Elha Nympha	Beyoncé – "Love On Top"	5	6	7	18	3rd
3	Justin Alva	Michael Jackson – "Beat It"	4	4	4	12	5th-8th
4	Awra Briguela	Dionisia Pacquiao – "Wrecking Ball"	8	8	8	24	1st
5	Alonzo Muhlach	Harry Styles of One Direction – "What Makes You Beautiful"	4	4	4	12	5th-8th
6	Sam Shoaf	Bruno Mars – "Uptown Funk"	7	5	5	17	4th
7	Lyca Gairanod	Katy Perry – "Roar"	4	4	4	12	5th-8th
8	AC Bonifacio	Britney Spears – "...Baby One More Time"	6	7	6	19	2nd

=== Week 2 (January 14 & 15) ===
Episode hashtag

- #YFSFCutenessOverload (Saturday)
- #YFSFAmazingKids (Sunday)

Order	Contestant	Performance	Stars				Rank
Order	Contestant	Performance	Ogie	Sharon	Gary	Total	Rank
1	Alonzo Muhlach	Rico J. Puno – "Macho Gwapito"	5	5	5	15	4th/5th
2	Sam Shoaf	Alicia Keys – "If I Ain't Got You"	4	4	4	12	6th-8th
3	Lyca Gairanod	Lady Gaga – "Poker Face"	4	4	4	12	6th-8th
4	Awra Briguela	Daniel Padilla – "Nasa Iyo Na ang Lahat"	4	4	4	12	6th-8th
5	AC Bonifacio	Sandara Park of 2NE1 – "Kiss"	6	6	6	18	2nd/3rd
6	Xia Vigor	Taylor Swift – "You Belong with Me"	7	4	4	15	4th/5th
7	Justin Alva	Adam Levine of Maroon 5 – "Sugar"	4	7	7	18	2nd/3rd
8	Elha Nympha	Sharon Cuneta – "Bituing Walang Ningning"	8	8	8	24	1st

=== Week 3 (January 21 & 22) ===
Episode hashtag

- #YFSFSuperKids (Saturday)
- #YFSFKidSensation (Sunday)

Order	Contestant	Performance	Stars				Rank
Order	Contestant	Performance	Ogie	Sharon	Gary	Total	Rank
1	Elha Nympha	Meghan Trainor – "Lips Are Movin"	5	5	7	17	3rd-4th
2	Alonzo Muhlach	Justin Bieber – "Baby"	4	4	4	12	5th-8th
3	Justin Alva	Francis Magalona – "Mga Kababayan Ko"	6	6	5	17	3rd-4th
4	AC Bonifacio	Jessie J – "Domino"	4	4	4	12	5th-8th
5	Awra Briguela	Rihanna – "Where Have You Been"	7	7	6	20	2nd
6	Sam Shoaf	Elvis Presley – "Jailhouse Rock"	4	4	4	12	5th-8th
7	Lyca Gairanod	Jessa Zaragoza – "Bakit Pa?"	4	4	4	12	5th-8th
8	Xia Vigor	Axl Rose of Guns N' Roses – "Sweet Child o' Mine"	8	8	8	24	1st

=== Week 4 (January 28 & 29) ===
Episode hashtag

- #YFSFTalentedKids (Saturday)
- #YFSFWonderKids (Sunday)

Order	Contestant	Performance	Stars				Rank
Order	Contestant	Performance	Ogie	Sharon	Gary	Total	Rank
1	Xia Vigor	Thalía – "Maria Mercedes"	6	4	5	15	3rd-5th
2	Sam Shoaf	John Legend – "All of Me"	7	5	7	19	2nd
3	Elha Nympha	Andrew E. – "Humanap Ka ng Panget"	4	6	4	14	6th
4	Justin Alva	Steven Tyler of Aerosmith – "I Don't Want to Miss a Thing"	4	4	4	12	7th/8th
5	Alonzo Muhlach	April Boy Regino – "Di Ko Kayang Tanggapin"	4	4	4	12	7th/8th
6	Awra Briguela	Yoyoy Villame – "Butse Kik"	4	7	4	15	3rd-5th
7	AC Bonifacio	Alanis Morissette – "Ironic"	5	4	6	15	3rd-5th
8	Lyca Gairanod	Tina Turner – "Proud Mary"	8	8	8	24	1st

=== Week 5 (February 4 & 5) ===
Episode hashtag

- #YFSFAwesomeKids (Saturday)
- #YFSFPhenomenalKids (Sunday)

Order	Contestant	Performance	Stars				Rank
Order	Contestant	Performance	Ogie	Sharon	Gary	Total	Rank
1	Lyca Gairanod	Nora Aunor – "Tiny Bubbles"	4	4	4	12	5th-8th
2	Alonzo Muhlach	Boy George of Culture Club – "The War Song"	6	6	7	19	2nd/3rd
3	AC Bonifacio	Cher – "Believe"	4	4	4	12	5th-8th
4	Elha Nympha	Chaka Khan – "Through the Fire"	4	4	4	12	5th-8th
5	Awra Briguela	Liza Minnelli – "Cabaret"	4	4	4	12	5th-8th
6	Xia Vigor	Ariana Grande – "Break Free"	7	7	5	19	2nd/3rd
7	Justin Alva	Ed Sheeran – "Thinking Out Loud"	5	5	6	16	4th
8	Sam Shoaf	Pepe Smith of Juan de la Cruz Band – "Balong Malalim"	8	8	8	24	1st

=== Week 6 (February 11 & 12) ===
Episode hashtag

- #YFSFUnbeatableKids (Saturday)
- #ILoveYFSFKids (Sunday)

Order	Contestant	Performance	Stars				Rank
Order	Contestant	Performance	Ogie	Sharon	Gary	Total	Rank
1	Alonzo Muhlach	Jon Bon Jovi of Bon Jovi – "It's My Life"	4	4	4	12	6th-8th
2	Lyca Gairanod	Freddie Aguilar – "Anak"	4	4	5	13	5th
3	Sam Shoaf	Prince of Prince and The Revolution – "Kiss"	7	7	6	20	2nd
4	Awra Briguela	Shakira – "Waka Waka (This Time for Africa)"	5	5	4	14	4th
5	Xia Vigor	Pilita Corrales – "Rosas Pandan"	4	4	4	12	6th-8th
6	Justin Alva	Rod Stewart – "I Don't Want to Talk About It"	6	6	7	19	3rd
7	Elha Nympha	Sia – "Titanium"	4	4	4	12	6th-8th
8	AC Bonifacio	Usher – "DJ Got Us Fallin' in Love"	8	8	8	24	1st

=== Week 7 (February 18 & 19) ===
Episode hashtag

- #YFSFKidsRule (Saturday)
- #YFSFAdorableKids (Sunday)

Order	Contestant	Impersonated artist	Stars				Rank
Order	Contestant	Impersonated artist	Ogie	Sharon	Gary	Total	Rank
1	Alonzo Muhlach	Silentó – "Watch Me (Whip/Nae Nae)"	4	4	4	12	6th-8th
2	Lyca Gairanod	Bonnie Tyler – "Total Eclipse of the Heart"	5	4	5	14	5th
3	Justin Alva	Avril Lavigne – "Sk8er Boi"	4	6	6	16	3rd
4	Elha Nympha	Dulce – "Ako ang Nasawi, Ako ang Nagwagi"	7	7	7	21	2nd
5	Xia Vigor	Diana Ross – "Ain't No Mountain High Enough"	4	4	4	12	6th-8th
6	Awra Briguela	Shirley Bassey – "I Am What I Am"	6	5	4	15	4th
7	AC Bonifacio	Gloria Estefan – "Get on Your Feet"	4	4	4	12	6th-8th
8	Sam Shoaf	MC Hammer – "U Can't Touch This"	8	8	8	24	1st

=== Week 8 (February 25 & 26) ===
Episode hashtag

- #YFSFExceptionalKids (Saturday)
- #YFSFWowKids (Sunday)

Order	Contestant	Performance	Stars				Rank
Order	Contestant	Performance	Ogie	Sharon	Gary	Total	Rank
1	Xia Vigor	apl.de.ap of Black Eyed Peas – "Bebot"	7	7	7	21	2nd
2	Sam Shoaf	Kenny Rogers – "Through the Years"	4	4	4	12	5th-8th
3	Justin Alva	Justin Timberlake – "Can't Stop the Feeling!"	4	4	4	12	5th-8th
4	Awra Briguela	Dolphy – "Fly Me to the Moon"	6	5	5	16	4th
5	Lyca Gairanod	Whitney Houston – "Queen of the Night"	4	4	4	12	5th-8th
6	Elha Nympha	Sam Smith – "Stay with Me"	8	8	8	24	1st
7	AC Bonifacio	Celine Dion – "My Heart Will Go On"	4	4	4	12	5th-8th
8	Alonzo Muhlach	Cyndi Lauper – "Girls Just Want to Have Fun"	5	6	6	17	3rd

=== Week 9 (March 4 & 5) ===
Episode hashtag

- #YFSFKulitKids (Saturday)
- #YFSFLovableKids (Sunday)

Order	Contestant	Performance	Stars				Rank
Order	Contestant	Performance	Ogie	Sharon	Gary	Total	Rank
1	Alonzo Muhlach	Psy – "Gentleman"	8	8	8	24	1st
2	Elha Nympha	Lea Salonga – "Mula Noon Hanggang Ngayon"	7	7	6	20	2nd
3	Lyca Gairanod	Debbie Gibson – "Electric Youth"	4	4	5	13	5th
4	Sam Shoaf	P!nk – "Get the Party Started"	4	4	4	12	6th - 7th
5	AC Bonifacio	Vanilla Ice – "Ice Ice Baby"	6	6	4	16	4th
6	Awra Briguela	Alice Cooper – "I Never Cry"	5	5	7	17	3rd
7	Justin Alva	Paul Anka – "Put Your Head on My Shoulder"	4	4	4	12	6th - 7th

=== Week 10 (March 11 & 12) ===
Episode hashtag

- #YFSFBestKids (Saturday)
- #YFSFUnkabogableKids (Sunday)

Order	Contestant	Performance	Stars				Rank
Order	Contestant	Performance	Ogie	Sharon	Gary	Total	Rank
1	Alonzo Muhlach	Bayani Agbayani – "Otso Otso"	4	4	4	12	6th-8th
2	Elha Nympha	Dolly Parton – "I Will Always Love You"	8	8	8	24	1st
3	Justin Alva	Chris Brown – "With You"	4	5	5	14	4th
4	AC Bonifacio	Christina Aguilera – "Fighter"	5	4	4	13	5th
5	Xia Vigor	Jennifer Lopez – "Let's Get Loud"	4	4	4	12	6th-8th
6	Awra Briguela	Vice Ganda – "Boom Panes"	7	6	6	19	3rd
7	Lyca Gairanod	Lolita Carbon of Asin – "Masdan Mo ang Kapaligiran"	6	7	7	20	2nd
8	Sam Shoaf	Gary Valenciano – "Hataw Na"	4	4	4	12	6th-8th

=== Week 11 (March 18 & 19) ===
Episode hashtag

- #YFSFGiftedKids (Saturday)
- #YFSFIncredibleKids (Sunday)

Order	Contestant	Performance	Stars				Rank
Order	Contestant	Performance	Ogie	Sharon	Gary	Total	Rank
1	Xia Vigor	Aaron Carter – "Crush on You"	4	4	4	12	6th-8th
2	Lyca Gairanod	Jaya – "Wala Na Bang Pag-ibig"	4	5	6	15	4th
3	Sam Shoaf	Enrique Iglesias – "Hero"	4	4	4	12	6th-8th
4	Awra Briguela	Elizabeth Ramsey – "Waray Waray"	5	4	5	14	5th
5	Alonzo Muhlach	Lou Bega – "Mambo No. 5"	4	4	4	12	6th-8th
6	Elha Nympha	Tracy Chapman – "Fast Car"	7	6	4	17	3rd
7	Justin Alva	Charlie Puth – "One Call Away"	6	7	7	20	2nd
8	AC Bonifacio	Janet Jackson – "Rhythm Nation"	8	8	8	24	1st

=== Week 12 (March 25 & 26) ===
Episode hashtag

- #YFSFTrendingKids (Saturday)
- #YFSFUnstoppableKids (Sunday)

Order	Contestant	Performance	Stars				Rank
Order	Contestant	Performance	Ogie	Sharon	Gary	Total	Rank
1	Alonzo Muhlach	Mike Hanopol of Juan de la Cruz Band – "Laki sa Layaw"	4	4	4	12	5th-8th
2	Elha Nympha	Mariah Carey – "Honey"	4	4	4	12	5th-8th
3	Sam Shoaf	Bamboo Mañalac of Bamboo – "Hallelujah"	8	7	6	21	1st
4	AC Bonifacio	Gwen Stefani – "Hollaback Girl"	7	8	5	20	2nd
5	Xia Vigor	Julie Andrews – "Do-Re-Mi"	6	5	8	19	3rd
6	Awra Briguela	Louis Armstrong – "What a Wonderful World"	5	6	7	18	4th
7	Lyca Gairanod	Donna Cruz – "Kapag Tumibok ang Puso"	4	4	4	12	5th-8th
8	Justin Alva	Lionel Richie – "Hello"	4	4	4	12	5th-8th

=== Week 13 (April 1 & 2) ===
Episode hashtag

- #YFSFFantasticKids (Saturday)
- #YFSFKidsGrandFinalists (Sunday)

Order	Contestant	Performance	Stars				Rank
Order	Contestant	Performance	Ogie	Sharon	Gary	Total	Rank
1	Xia Vigor	Emma Bunton of Spice Girls – "Stop"	7	5	7	19	2nd
2	Awra Briguela	Grace Jones – "Do or Die"	4	4	4	12	7th/8th
3	Lyca Gairanod	Toni Braxton – "Un-Break My Heart"	4	4	4	12	7th/8th
4	Sam Shoaf	George Michael of Wham! – "Wake Me Up Before You Go-Go"	6	7	4	17	3rd
5	Alonzo Muhlach	Pitbull – "I Know You Want Me (Calle Ocho)"	4	4	5	13	6th
6	Elha Nympha	Ogie Alcasid – "Dito sa Puso Ko"	4	4	6	14	5th
7	Justin Alva	Bob Marley of Bob Marley & the Wailers – "Waiting in Vain"	8	8	8	24	1st
8	AC Bonifacio	Kylie Minogue – "Can't Get You Out of My Head"	5	6	4	15	4th

=== Finals: Week 14 (April 8 & 9) ===
The finale, dubbed as The Grand Showdown was held in Newport Performing Arts Theater, Resorts World Manila. All eight contestants were chosen to compete for the grand prize.

During the second night, Kathryn Bernardo and Daniel Padilla appeared on the show to promote their then-upcoming film "Can't Help Falling in Love" which was released on April 15, 2017.

Non-competition performances

- Sharon Cuneta & Frankie Pangilinan - "I-Swing Mo Ako" by VST & Co.
- Ogie Alcasid & Leila Alcasid - "Sumayaw, Sumunod" by Boyfriends
- Gary Valenciano & Kiana Valenciano - "Mahal Na Mahal Ko Siya" by Josh Santana
- Kathryn Bernardo & Daniel Padilla - "Can't Help Falling in Love" by Elvis Presley

Episode hashtag

- #YFSFKidsGrandShowdown (Saturday)
- #YFSFKidsGrandWinner (Sunday)

Order	Contestant	Performance	Points			Rank
Order	Contestant	Performance	Stars	Votes	Total	Rank
1	Sam Shoaf	Freddie Mercury of Queen – "We Will Rock You"	46.72%	2.13%	48.85%	Sixth place
2	AC Bonifacio	Sarah Geronimo – "Kilometro"	46.29%	11.66%	57.95%	Third place
3	Alonzo Muhlach	Ricky Martin – "The Cup of Life"	40.17%	0.61%	40.78%	Eighth place
4	Elha Nympha	Luciano Pavarotti – "La donna è mobile"	50.00%	20.75%	70.75%	Second place
5	Xia Vigor	Madonna – "Vogue"	41.92%	7.00%	48.92%	Fifth place
6	Lyca Gairanod	Yeng Constantino – "Time In"	39.96%	3.94%	43.90%	Seventh place
7	Justin Alva	Arnel Pineda of Journey – "Don't Stop Believin'"	44.54%	10.37%	54.91%	Fourth place
8	Awra Briguela	Nicki Minaj – "Super Bass"	45.41%	50.00%	95.41%	Winner

== Television ratings ==
KANTAR MEDIA NATIONAL TV RATINGS 7:15PM PST (Sat) / 7:00PM PST (Sun)
PILOT EPISODE	FINALE EPISODE	PEAK	AVERAGE	SOURCE
31.4% (January 7, 7:15pm)	35.9% (April 9, 7:00pm)	38.3% (January 29, 7:00pm)	#1	
