= Comedy Island Philippines =

- Promotional poster
- Genre: Improv comedy; Reality competition
- Based on: Comedy Island
- Directed by: Randolph Longjas
- Presented by: Drew Arellano
- Starring: Andrea Brillantes; Carlo Aquino; Rufa Mae Quinto; Cai Cortez; Awra Briguela; Jerald Napoles; Justine Luzares
- Country of origin: Philippines
- Original languages: Filipino; English
- No. of seasons: 1
- No. of episodes: 6

Production
- Camera setup: Multi-camera
- Running time: 50 minutes
- Production companies: Amazon Studios; BASE Entertainment

Original release
- Network: Amazon Prime Video
- Release: August 31 – September 7, 2023

Comedy Island Philippines is a Philippine improv comedy and reality competition that is currently aired on Prime Video. It features seven celebrities who embark on an adventure when they are washed upon the shore of the fictional island named "Tawa-Tawa Island" (Laughter Island), testing their skills in improvisation. It aired on Amazon Prime Video from August 31 to September 7, 2023.

== Development and production ==
Prime Video first announced the series on July 27, 2023. They also revealed the premiere date, cast, and the key art for the series. The trailer for the series was released on August 24, 2023. Three more episodes were released on September 7, 2023. A press conference for the series was held on August 30, 2023.

Principal photography for the series began on a resort in Thailand on 2022 and lasted for one month.

== Format ==
Comedy Island Philippines features seven celebrities that were sent to an island named Tawa-Tawa Island (English: Laughter Island), and in order to escape, they must improvise in a series of challenges given on the show. Some of the scenes are both scripted and unscripted, hence the show's tagline: "When in doubt, improvise". Contestants must battle it out to become the island's "Centennial Games Winner".

== Cast ==
=== Main cast ===
- Drew Arellano as Dodong, the host of the Centennial Games. Drew was initially skeptical of the series when it was pitched to him due to the length of time he would be away from his wife, Iya Villania, and their four children. Drew recounted his initial thoughts when Prime Video approached him to host the show during a press conference on August 30, 2023. "When they spoke to me I was like 'Wait, wait... how long? One month?! Away from the kids?!' That was for me the major reason why I was quite hesitant."
- Andrea Brillantes as herself
- Awra Briguela as herself
- Cai Cortez as herself
- Carlo Aquino as himself
- Jerald Napoles as himself
- Justine Luzares as himself
- Rufa Mae Quinto as herself

=== Supporting cast ===
- Sean Mangali as Jepoy
- Sharmaine Buencamino
- Meann Espinosa as Maleya the Stage Manager
- Happy Constantino as Chuwariwap
- Marjorie Lorico as Chuwariwap
- Dingdong Rosales as Villager
- Kiki Baento as Ligaya
- Dylan Ray Talon as Tuwa
- Jonathan Tadioan as Ngisi
- Dudz Teraña as Babaylan

== Episodes ==
No. overall	No. in season	Title	Original release date
1	1	"The Mysterious Island"	August 31, 2022
Carlo Aquino is hiding in a comic bookstore one minute. The next, he finds himself on a mysterious island, along with six other celebrities, being forced to participate in a game of life and death. They are then thrust into the first round of the games - a pageant where they must pass the crucial question and answer portion, using their wits to improvise, or else face dire consequences.
2	2	"The Gift"	August 31, 2022
The festivities are interrupted by a strong typhoon that rocks the whole island. Supplies are hard to come by, and the participants will do anything to get their hands on them. Anything.
3	3	"The Centennial Games"	August 31, 2022
The games are well under way. The contestants must set aside their differences and team up in order to win against the local crew, the Tawa-Tawa Tamaraws.
4	4	"The Trial"	September 7, 2022
The Orb that contains the gift to humanity has gone missing. The contestants, who have been found at the scene of the crime, are arrested, interrogated and put under trial.
5	5	"The Seer"	September 7, 2022
The contestants must find the real culprit to save an innocent man from being executed. Their journey brings them to a mysterious shaman, who not only makes killer adobo but also provides clues to the thief's identity
6	6	"The Final Challenge"	September 7, 2022
The Orb is finally back in its place. The remaining contestants face the final leg of the Centennial Games. Who gets to go home and change the course of humanity forever?
