= Awra Briguela =

Filipino actor and comedian (born 2004)

- Born: March 26, 2004 (age 22); Las Piñas, Metro Manila, Philippines
- Occupations: Actress; comedian; singer; dancer
- Years active: 2016–present
- Agent(s): PowerCasting Artist Management; Star Magic (2016–present)
- Known for: MakMak in Ang Probinsyano; Megan in The Super Parental Guardians
- Musical career

Awra Briguela (born March 26, 2004) (Tagalog: [ˈaʊɾa brɪˈgela]), is a Filipino actress and comedian who gained recognition after starring in FPJ's Ang Probinsyano (2016–2019), personally chosen for the role by the show's lead actor Coco Martin. Briguela's life was featured in a titular episode of Maalaala Mo Kaya in 2016. In 2017, Awra was declared champion in the first season of the Filipino version of Your Face Sounds Familiar Kids.

== Early life and education ==
Awra Briguela was born on March 26, 2004. She is the daughter of Marivic Briguela and Oneal Brian Briguela.

She studied junior high school at Las Piñas National High School Almanza in 2016. She was moved to Manila at Uno High School. She finished junior high school in 2020. She studied senior high school under Humanities and Social Sciences (HUMSS) strand at University of the East Manila from 2024 to her graduation in 2025. She is pursuing a bachelor's degree in psychology the same school as of November 2025.

== Career ==
Briguela started her career off as an internet celebrity. Briguela became known to her parents for impersonating actresses like Sarah Geronimo and Sarah Lahbati. She was discovered by actor Coco Martin, who saw her potential in the primetime television series FPJ's Ang Probinsyano (2016–2019), a remake of the 1997 film of the same title and name. Briguela gained widespread for her role as "MakMak" and the series was produced by Dreamscape Entertainment Television, who created many successful pictures such as Doble Kara, Ina, Kapatid, Anak, and Till I Met You. Briguela starred in the series opposite Coco Martin, Susan Roces, Maja Salvador, Bela Padilla, Albert Martinez, Arjo Atayde, Eddie Garcia, Agot Isidro, Jaime Fabregas, and Simon "Onyok" Pineda, who played the role of Onyok. Briguela won a 3rd Aral Parangal Awards for Best Child Performer, which she won twice, for the primetime series.

Her life was featured in an episode of Maalaala Mo Kaya, playing as herself alongside Aleck Bovick and Janus del Prado who played her mother and father respectively. She made her feature film debut in the Super Parental Guardians (2016) where she portrayed the role of Megan Gaspar alongside fellow Ang Probinsyano actors Coco Martin, Onyok Pineda and Vice Ganda. Briguela later participated as a contestant in Your Face Sounds Familiar Kids (season 1).

== Personal life ==
Briguela is fond of impersonating Filipina actresses like Sarah Geronimo, Sarah Lahbati, and her idol Maja Salvador, who was one of her co-casts in FPJ's Ang Probinsyano. She popularized her screen name "Awra" upon achieving mainstream recognition as an actor and comedian.

Raised as a boy, her parents said that she has already shown signs of "being gay" since she was three years old for expressing preference for Barbie, Hello Kitty and skirts. However, by 2023, she had come out as a trans woman. She chose not to get hormone replace therapy or take pills remarking how she prefers the ability to "freely express both her masculine and feminine side"

Briguela financially supported her father Oneal Brian Briguela's graduate education after having completed college in 2019. Briguela earned her Master of Business Administration degree from Philippine Christian University in 2024.

In 2025, Briguela was the subject of online misgendering when several people left comments on her Instagram posts referring to her as "sir" and comparing her to basketball player Bronny James. After her senior high school graduation in July 2025, content creator and disability advocate Jack Argota quipped that media coverage referred to Briguela with she/her pronouns, prompting Argota to call Briguela a "bro" in a Facebook post. In response, an admin of Briguela's Facebook page criticized Argota by referring to her as "the real trans" due to her cleft palate.

=== Bar altercation ===
On June 29, 2023, Briguela was arrested for inflicting physical injury following an altercation at The Bolthole Bar in Poblacion, Makati. According to witnesses and CCTV footage, Awra took exception when a male guest refused to take off her shirt. Awra was later released on July 1 after posting bail.

== Discography ==
=== Singles ===
Year	Track	Album	Details	Ref.
2017	"Clap Clap Clap Awra"	—N/a	Words and Music by: Jonathan Manalo & Roque "Rox" Santos; Mixed, Mastered and Arranged by: KIDWolf; Vocal Supervision and Produced by: Roque "Rox" Santos; Published by: Star Songs	

== Filmography ==
=== Films ===
Year	Title	Role	Note	Ref.
2025	Mudrasta: Ang Beking Ina!	Young Melancio Antonio	Supporting role	
2023	Here Comes the Groom	Whitney	Supporting role, Official 1st Summer Metro Manila Film Festival Entry	
2021	Big Night!	Galema	Supporting role, Official 47th Metro Manila Film Festival	
2020	James & Pat & Dave	Susano "Sasha" Reyes	Supporting role	
2019	Familia Blondina	Mondesto Periquit	Supporting role	
2017	Ang Panday	Diego	Supporting role, Official 43rd Metro Manila Film Festival Entry	
2016	The Super Parental Guardians	Melvin "Megan" Nabati	First in a child star supporting role	

=== Drama series ===
Year	Title	Role	Notes	Ref.
2023	Comedy Island Philippines	Awra - The Influence	Main role	
2022	Suntok sa Buwan	Orange	Supporting cast	
2022	Lyric and Beat	Unique	Main role	
2019	Mga Batang Poz	Chuchay	Main protagonist	
2019	"Past, Present, Perfect?"	Bembem	Main role	
2017	Wansapanataym: Amazing Ving	Ving Cristobal	Season 7, Episodes 364–373, Main protagonist	
2016	Maalaala Mo Kaya: Fifty Pesos	Herself	Biographical film, Season 24: Episode 47	
2016–2019	Ang Probinsyano	Macario "Mak Mak" Samonte Jr.	Supporting, recurring role / Protagonist	

=== TV shows ===
Year	Title	Notes	Ref.
2026	Your Face Sounds Familiar (season 4)	Round 10 Guest Performer as Jennifer Lopez	
2023	Emojination	Herself/Host	
2022	All-Out Sundays	Guest Performer	
2020	Yes Yes Yow!	Host/Performer	
2017	Your Face Sounds Familiar Kids (season 1)	Contestant, Grand Winner	
2016	ASAP	2016–present, recurring guest and performer	
2016–2020	Gandang Gabi, Vice!	Recurring Guest	
2016	It's Showtime	2016–present, recurring guest and performer	

=== Online shows ===
Year	Title	Role	Notes	Ref.
2021	Your Face Sounds Familiar: KaFamiliar Online Live	Herself	Substitute host	

== Accolades ==
Year	Award-giving Body	Category	Work	Result	Ref.
2016	30th PMPC Star Awards for Television	Best Child Performer	FPJ's Ang Probinsyano	Won	
2017	3rd Aral Parangal Awards	Best Child Performer	FPJ's Ang Probinsyano	Won	
2017	3rd Platinum Stallion Media Awards	Best Film Child Actor	The Super Parental Guardians	Won	
2017	33rd PMPC Star Awards for Movies	New Movie Actor of the Year	The Super Parental Guardians	Nominated	
2017	33rd PMPC Star Awards for Movies	Child Performer of the Year	The Super Parental Guardians	Nominated	
2018	3rd Illumine Innovation Awards for Television	Most Innovative TV Child Star	—	Won	

Achievements
Preceded by Denise Laurel	Your Face Sounds Familiar (Philippine TV series); Winner; 2017	Succeeded by TNT Boys
First	Your Face Sounds Familiar Kids (Philippine TV series) Kids Season; Winner; January–April 2017	Succeeded by TNT Boys
