= Nyoy Volante =

Filipino singer-songwriter and actor

- Born: Niño del Mar Coching Volante; January 25, 1978 (age 48)
- Spouse: Mikkie Bradshaw (m. 2016)
- Musical career
- Genre: Acoustic pop
- Occupations: Singer, songwriter
- Instruments: Vocals, guitar
- Years active: 2000–present

Niño del Mar Coching Volante (born January 25, 1978), better known as Nyoy Volante (Tagalog: [ˈnjoɪ bɔˈlantɛ]), is a Filipino acoustic pop singer-songwriter and actor.

== Early life and education ==
Nyoy Volante was born as Niño del Mar Coching Volante on January 25, 1978, to parents Oliver Volante and Evangeline Coching Volante. He had a sister nicknamed Nyay.

He obtained his Bachelor of Arts in Technical Theater degree from De La Salle-College of Saint Benilde. After graduation, he worked with prominent performance groups like Gantimpala Theater and Filipino theater actress Monique Wilson’s New Voice Company. He worked in lights, sound and production design, occasionally stumbling upon small directorial gigs.

== Career ==
Volante started his career at the early 2000s. His famous songs are Nasaan Ka Na, Wansapanataym and Someday.

In 2015, he was one of the eight contestants of the first season of Your Face Sounds Familiar, and made his acting debut on ABS-CBN in the TV series Ningning.

He played Lola, the title character in Atlantis Productions' Kinky Boots musical in 2018 and 2019 at the Carlos P. Romulo Auditorium, Makati.

Since the second season of Kids, he has been the choreography mentor of Your Face Sounds Familiar.

== Personal life ==
Volante had a relationship with fellow Filipino singer Nina but their relationship ended in 2007. In 2009, she sued Volante's parents with an alleged estafa case after they failed to settle their 1.4-million peso debt.

On February 24, 2016, he married Filipino theater actress Mikkie Bradshaw at the Manila Cathedral, Intramuros, Manila. He is the stepfather to his wife's daughter Sofie.

== Filmography ==
=== Television ===
Year	Title	Role	Network
2007	Celebrity Duets: Philippine Edition	Himself, duet partner for Hayden Kho	GMA Network
2008	Celebrity Duets: Philippine Edition	Himself, duet partner for Phil Younghusband	GMA Network
2009–present	ASAP Natin 'To	Himself	ABS-CBN
2015–2016	Ningning	Johnny Bautista	ABS-CBN
2015	Your Face Sounds Familiar (season 1)	Himself, contestant	ABS-CBN
2015	Pinoy Big Brother: 737	Houseguest as Ariana Grande impersonator	ABS-CBN
2016–present	It's Showtime	Himself, as hurado (judge) of Tawag ng Tanghalan	ABS-CBN; Kapamilya Channel; A2Z; All TV; TV5; GTV; GMA Network
2017	Your Face Sounds Familiar Kids (season 2)	Himself, mentor	ABS-CBN
2017	Maalaala Mo Kaya: "Tubuhan"	Rey, father of Noven Belleza	ABS-CBN
2017	Ipaglaban Mo!: "Ampon"	Mario Juliano	ABS-CBN
2017	Maalaala Mo Kaya: "Gitara"	Joel	ABS-CBN
2018	I Can See Your Voice	Himself, guest artist	ABS-CBN
2018	Gandang Gabi, Vice!	Himself, guest (with Jed Madela)	ABS-CBN
2018	Spirits Reawaken	Jose Carpio/Maestro	ABS-CBN
2019	Maalaala Mo Kaya: "₱600"	Henry	ABS-CBN
2020	Your Moment	Celebrity mentor	ABS-CBN
2021	Your Face Sounds Familiar (season 3)	Himself, mentor	Kapamilya Channel; A2Z
2025	Your Face Sounds Familiar (season 4)	Himself, mentor	Kapamilya Channel; A2Z; All TV; TV5
2026	Born to Shine	Elvis M. Quijano	GMA Network

- Protégé (GMA 7)
- P.O.5 (TV5) – guest performer
- StarStruck (GMA 7)
- Pinoy Dream Academy (ABS-CBN 2) – guest judge & teacher
- Wowowee (ABS-CBN 2) – guest performer
- Maynila (GMA 7) – guest performer
- Eat Bulaga! (GMA 7/TV5/CNN Philippines/RPTV) - guest performer
- SOP (GMA 7) – guest performer
- Magandang Tanghali Bayan (ABS-CBN 2) – guest performer

=== Digital ===
- Spirits: Reawaken as Maestro Jose Carpio (iWant, 2018)
- Lyric and Beat as Wolfgang Aragon (iWantTFC, 2022)

=== Film ===
Year	Title	Role (Notes)	Production company
2008	Teach Me To Love	unknown	CMB Films
2012	D' Kilabots Pogi Brothers Weh?!	Guitarist (Special participation)	APT Entertainment; M - Zet Productions
2019	Damaso	unknown	Regis Films; Reality Entertainment

== Discography ==
=== Studio albums ===
List of studio albums by Nyoy Volante
Title	Details	Ref.
Nyoy Volante	Released: 2000; Label: Viva Records	
Heartstrings	Released: May 6, 2008; Label: Vicor Music	
Now Hear This	Released: August 9, 2008; Label: Vicor Music	
Acoustic (credited as Nyoy Volante & Mannos)	Released: 2009; Label: Vicor Music	
In You (International Version)	Released: January 1, 2010; Label: MCA-Universal Philippines	
Tuloy Pa Rin	Released: January 1, 2012; Label: MCA Music	

=== Singles ===
List of singles where Nyoy Volante is lead artist
Title	Year	Album	Ref.
"God Gave Me You" (with Sabrina)	2012	Non-album singles	
"Chosen" (with Bukas Palad Music Ministry)	2018	Non-album singles	
"Awit Ko Na Naisulat Dahil sa Kagandahan Mo"	2020	Non-album singles	
"I Wanna Kiss You"	2020	Non-album singles	
"Huling Sayaw"	2020	PhilPop 2020: Music Breaking Borders	
"Salamat, Kabiyak" (with Trina Belamide)	2020	Non-album singles	
