= Your Face Sounds Familiar Kids (Philippine TV series) =

2017–18 Philippine television reality show

- Genre: Reality competition
- Based on: Your Face Sounds Familiar ABS-CBN Studios; Endemol Shine Group
- Presented by: Billy Crawford
- Judges: Sharon Cuneta; Gary Valenciano; Ogie Alcasid
- Country of origin: Philippines
- Original languages: Filipino (primary); English (secondary)
- No. of seasons: 2
- No. of episodes: 60

Original release
- Network: ABS-CBN
- Release: January 7, 2017 – August 19, 2018

Related
- Your Face Sounds Familiar

Your Face Sounds Familiar Kids is a Philippine television reality competition show broadcast by ABS-CBN. Based on the Spanish television series Your Face Sounds Familiar. Hosted by Billy Crawford and judges by Sharon Cuneta, Gary Valenciano and Ogie Alcasid, it aired on the network's Yes Weekend line up from January 7, 2017 to August 19, 2018, replacing Pinoy Boyband Superstar and was replaced by The Kids' Choice.

The show was a spin-off of Your Face Sounds Familiar of which is part of the Your Face Sounds Familiar franchise. However, in this show, child celebrities participate. The show airs on ABS-CBN during weekends.

== Format ==
The show challenges child celebrities to perform as different music icons for 14–16 weeks.

Each contestant impersonates a different singer each week, and performs an iconic song and dance routine well known by that particular icon. The "Iconizer" assigns icons to the contestants and can assign any icon living or dead regardless of its age, race or gender. The contestants must press the "Iconizer" at the end of every Sunday episode, in which they reveal the icon they have to impersonate in the following week, and a playback of the song assigned to them being played after they press it.

They are then judged a panel of celebrity judges called "The Jury". The contestants are awarded 4 to 8 stars by the jury. The total score of each contestant is counted by summing the stars from judges. In case of a tie, the judges will choose the week's winner.

Whoever is at the top of the leaderboard at the end of the each show receives a cash prize for themselves and a charity of their choice.

All contestants then advance after 13 or 15 weeks of competition into the finale called "The Grand Showdown". The contestants will personally select the icon they wish to pick for the said event. The winner is then decided by a score composed of the total stars from the jury and the votes cast by the public.

=== Prizes ===
Every week, the weekly winner would receive a medal and cash prize worth ₱100,000, where half would be given to the winner's charity of choice.

The grand prize was usually a trophy and a cash prize worth ₱1,000,000. Additional prizes such as a house and lot, tickets to a particular location and gadget showcases were also given to the champion but it varied per season.

== Cast ==
The host and judges of Your Face Sounds Familiar Kids

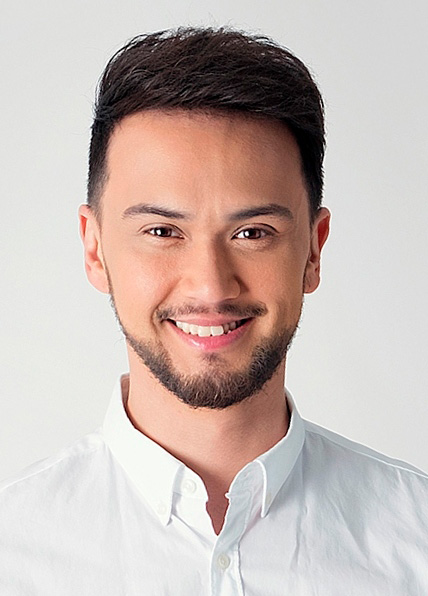
Billy Crawford

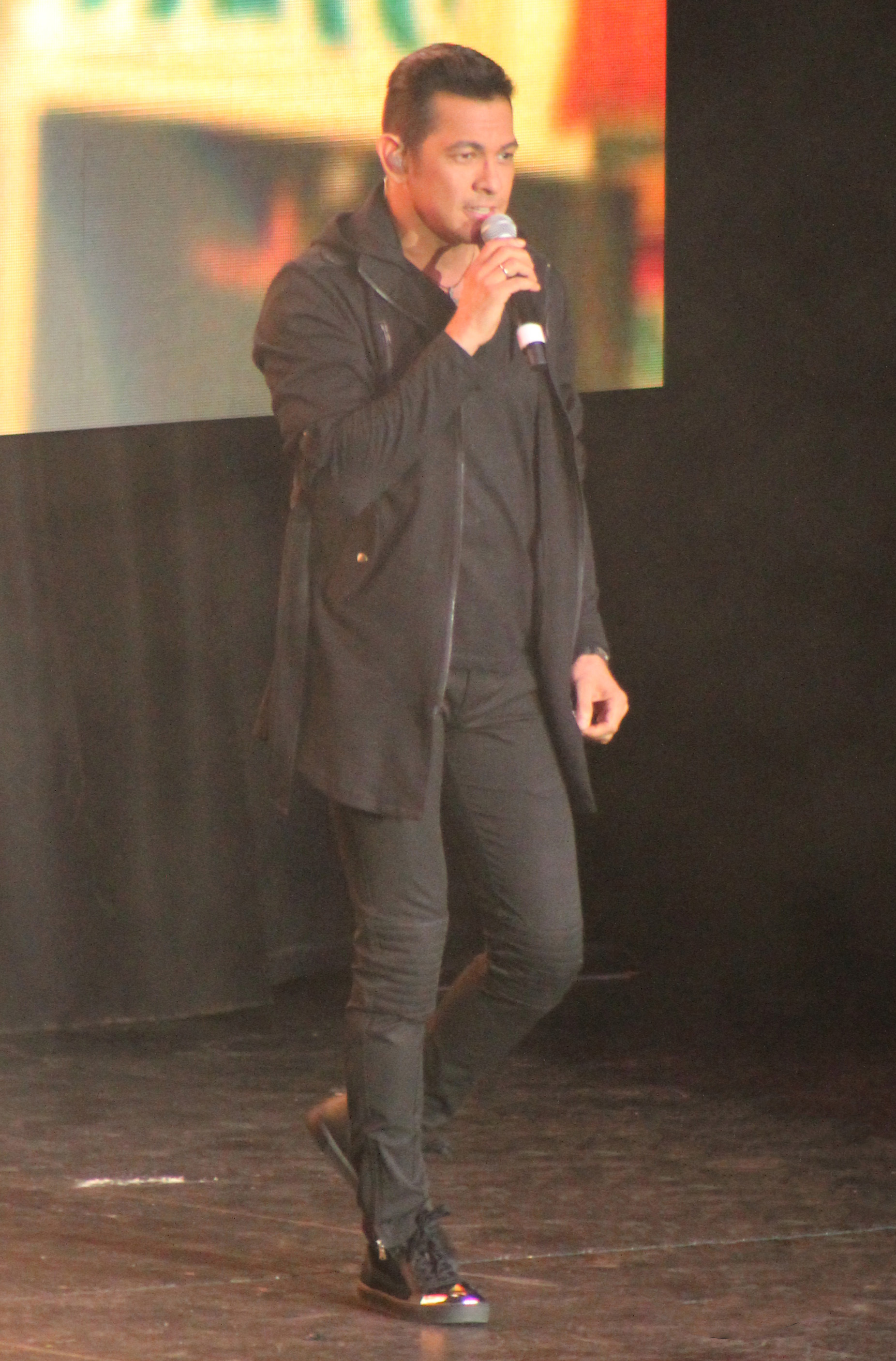
Gary Valenciano

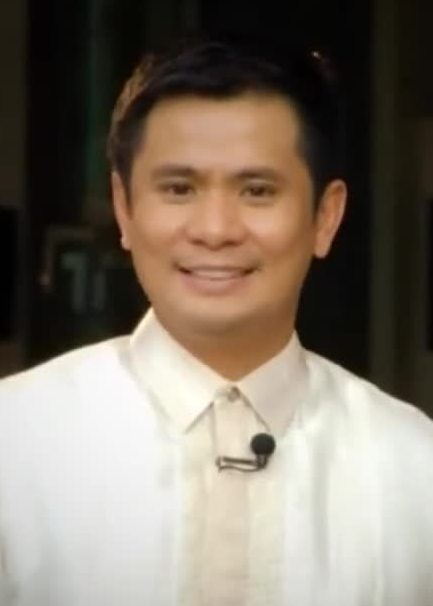
Ogie Alcasid

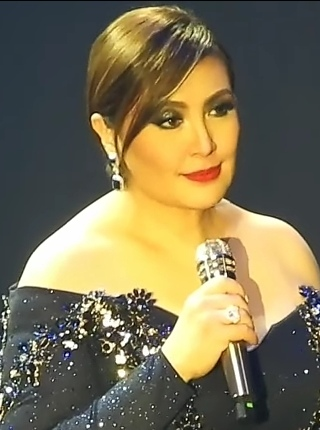
Sharon Cuneta

=== Host ===
Billy Crawford served as a host for both seasons.

=== The Jury ===
In each season there are three members of the jury. In an event that a sitting jury member cannot fulfill their duties for a particular week, a temporary replacement will take their place in that particular week.

=== Mentors ===
In each season there are two mentors (one for vocals and another for choreography) to aid the contestant in impersonating the icon that was assigned to them.

==== Current ====
- Jed Madela (vocals) (season 2)
- Nyoy Volante (choreography) (season 2)

==== Former ====
- Annie Quintos (vocals) (season 1)
- Georcelle Dapat-Sy (choreography) (season 1)

==== Cast timeline ====
Color key

Host
Judge
Mentor

Cast Member	Seasons	
Cast Member	1	2
Billy Crawford	●	●
Gary Valenciano	●	●
Ogie Alcasid	●	●
Sharon Cuneta	●	●
Annie Quintos	●	
Georcelle Dapat-Sy	●	
Jed Madela		●
Nyoy Volante		●

== Production ==
On August 15, 2016, Billy Crawford announced that Your Face Sounds Familiar will return for a third season, which was later revealed as the "Kids" edition. The first Kids season premiered on January 7, 2017.

On March 28, 2018, ABS-CBN released a teaser for its upcoming season (season 2 as "Kids" edition, season 4 overall). It premiered on May 5, 2018.

On May 5, 2018, the second season of the Kids edition premiered, replacing the timeslot of the sixth season of Pilipinas Got Talent. Billy Crawford returned as the host of that season. The Jury, who serves as the judges of the show, are Ogie Alcasid, Sharon Cuneta and Gary Valenciano. In this season, Jed Madela (vocals) and Nyoy Volante (choreography and movement) served as the kids' mentors, replacing Annie Quintos and Georcelle Dapat-Sy of G-Force respectively. Season 1 contestants Sam Shoaf, AC Bonifacio and Awra Briguela host the online companion show. The online companion show Your Face Sounds Familiar Kids: Breaktime is hosted by season 1 contestants Sam Shoaf, AC Bonifacio and Awra Briguela. It airs simultaneously with the main show, being streamed live on both the official Facebook page and YouTube channel of the show. Breaktime features behind-the-scene exclusives which are usually not aired on the main show. It also includes interviews of the cast and live comments from the viewers. It may or may not air in future seasons.

=== Broadcast ===
On January 7, 2019, the second season was re-run on the primetime lineup of Jeepney TV's Weeknights programs, replacing the Minute to Win It: Last Man Standing (season 2) on Jeepney TV.

On March 21, 2020, the first season was re-run on the primetime lineup of ABS-CBN's Yes Weekend block, temporarily replacing the ongoing season of The Voice Teens until the network was shut down.

== Season summary ==
Season	Episodes	Originally released		Winner	Second place	Third place	Fourth place	Fifth place	Sixth place	Seventh place	Eighth place
Season	Episodes	First released	Last released	Winner	Second place	Third place	Fourth place	Fifth place	Sixth place	Seventh place	Eighth place
1	28	January 7, 2017	April 9, 2017	Awra Briguela	Elha Nympha	AC Bonifacio	Justin Alva	Xia Vigor	Sam Shoaf	Lyca Gairanod	Alonzo Muhlach
2	32	May 5, 2018	August 19, 2018	TNT Boys	Onyok Pineda	Esang de Torres	Sheena Belarmino	Krystal Brimner	Noel Comia Jr.	Chun-sa Jung	Marco Masa

== See also ==
- List of programs broadcast by ABS-CBN
