= Your Face Sounds Familiar (Philippine TV series) =

Philippine television reality show

- Title card used since 2021
- Genre: Reality competition
- Based on: Your Face Sounds Familiar
- Developed by: ABS-CBN Corporation (Note: Credits as per the show's closing credits.); Endemol Shine Group; Banijay Entertainment
- Directed by: Johnny Manahan; Joane Laygo; Jon Raymond Moll; Arnel Natividad
- Presented by: Billy Crawford; Melai Cantiveros; Luis Manzano; Vhong Navarro; Jhong Hilario
- Judges: Sharon Cuneta; Gary Valenciano; Jed Madela; Ogie Alcasid
- Opening theme: "Your Face Sounds Familiar Theme"
- Country of origin: Philippines
- Original language: Filipino
- No. of seasons: 4 (regular)
- No. of episodes: 136

Production
- Executive producers: Carlo Katigbak; Cory Vidanes; Laurenti Dyogi; Luis Andrada
- Producers: Peter Edward Dizon; Leilani Gutierrez
- Production locations: Studio 4, ABS-CBN Broadcasting Center, Diliman, Quezon City; Studio 10, ABS-CBN Broadcasting Center, Diliman, Quezon City
- Running time: 60-75 minutes
- Production companies: ABS-CBN Studios; Banijay Asia

Original release
- Network: ABS-CBN
- Release: March 14 – December 13, 2015
- Network: Kapamilya Channel
- Release: February 20, 2021 – April 12, 2026

Related
- Your Face Sounds Familiar Kids

Your Face Sounds Familiar is a Philippine television reality competition show broadcast by ABS-CBN and Kapamilya Channel. Based on the Spanish television series Your Face Sounds Familiar. Originally hosted by Billy Crawford and originally judges by Sharon Cuneta, Jed Madela and Gary Valenciano. It aired from March 14, 2015 to April 12, 2026. Jhong Hilario and Vhong Navarro serve as the final hosts and Cuneta, Valenciano and Ogie Alcasid serve as the final judges.

The concept of the show involves celebrity performers impersonating icons, living or dead, regardless of their age, race, or gender, with guidance from industry professionals as part of a weekly competition. Weekly winners are decided panel of judges called "The Jury" who critique and give points to the contestants together with their co-competitors. The original jury was composed of Sharon Cuneta, Jed Madela, and Gary Valenciano. In season 3, Ogie Alcasid replaced Madela in the panel.

In the first two seasons, the points accumulated by the contestants determined the finalists, with the public vote determining the grand winner. Since season 3, the final total points form half of a composite score that determines the grand winner, with the other half coming from public voting. The winners of the first four seasons are Melai Cantiveros, Denise Laurel, Klarisse de Guzman, and JMielle.

== Format ==
Logo used for the first two seasons; both in 2015.

Your Face Sounds Familiar is part of the worldwide franchise that originated from the Spanish television series Tu cara me suena. Like in other franchises, the show features celebrity contestants (often four male, four female) who impersonate a different icon in popular culture each week and perform a signature song or dance routine well known by that particular icon. Icons are assigned by the "Iconizer", which assigns icons to the contestants, regardless of their age, race or gender. After all performances in a round, a celebrity jury of three ranks the contestants from 1 to 8, with their cumulative points being combined with points given by the performers amongst themselves to determine a weekly winner. In case of ties, the jury determines the winner by consensus.

Until season 3, one round typically lasted one week, consisting of performances aired on Saturday and Sunday. In rounds airing during Holy Week, a "Duets" round may be conducted covering the Sunday episode, where the contestants are paired to perform duets while being scored individually. In season 4, the duration of each round was extended to two weeks, lasting for two consecutive weekends, with performances aired on both Saturday and Sunday.

At the end of each round, all points accumulated throughout the season are tallied. Until season 2, the final total points determined the finalists for the season, wherein the top four (or more in case of ties) contestants advanced to the finale and competed for the public's votes to become the winner. However, beginning in season 3, the points form one half of a composite score that determines the winner, with the other half coming from the public vote.

=== Prizes ===
The prize given to the weekly winner varied from season to season. In seasons 1 and 2, the weekly winner was given a trophy and a cash prize worth ₱100,000, half of which was donated to a charity chosen by the winner. In Season 3 the weekly winner was still given a trophy, however the cash prize was reduced to 50,000 pesos with none being donated to charity, likely due to the pandemic-induced restrictions at the time of the season.

The Grand Prize is usually composed of a cash prize, a house and lot, and additional prizes, such as tickets to a particular destination. However, the cash prize varied from season to season. In seasons 1–2, the cash prize was worth ₱2,000,000 pesos, with half being donated to the winner's charity of choice. In Season 3, the cash prize was ₱4,000,000. In Season 4, the round prize for the winner was ₱50,000.

== Cast ==
The host and judges of Your Face Sounds Familiar

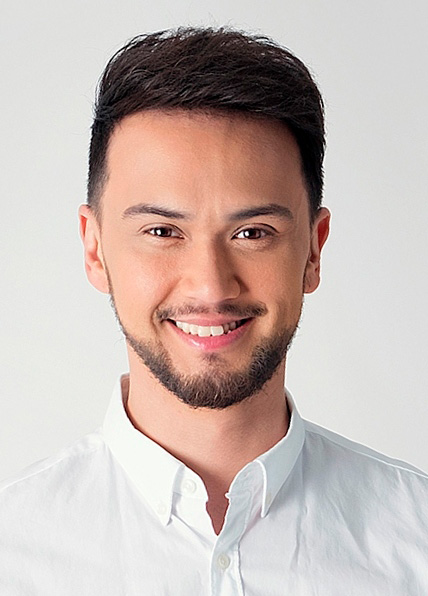
Billy Crawford

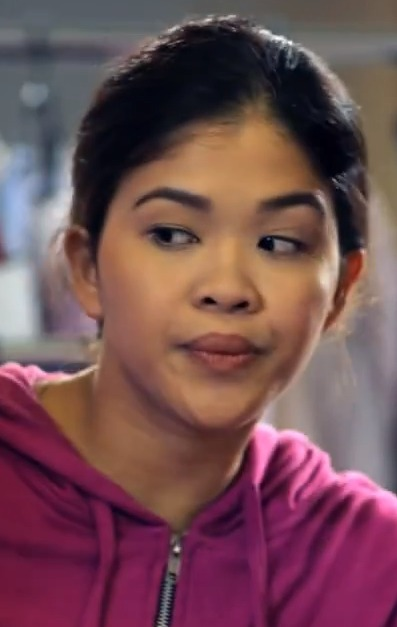
Melai Cantiveros

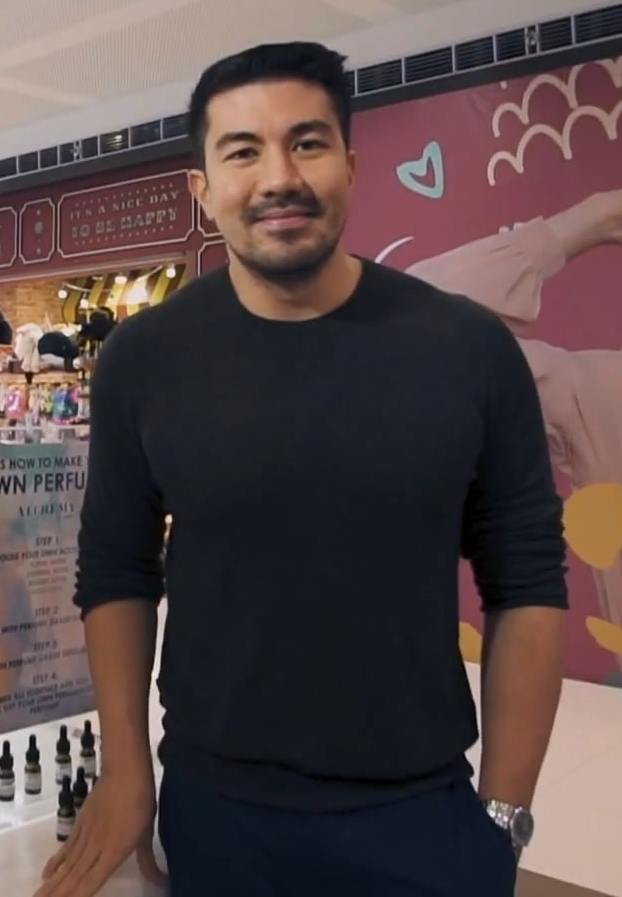
Luis Manzano

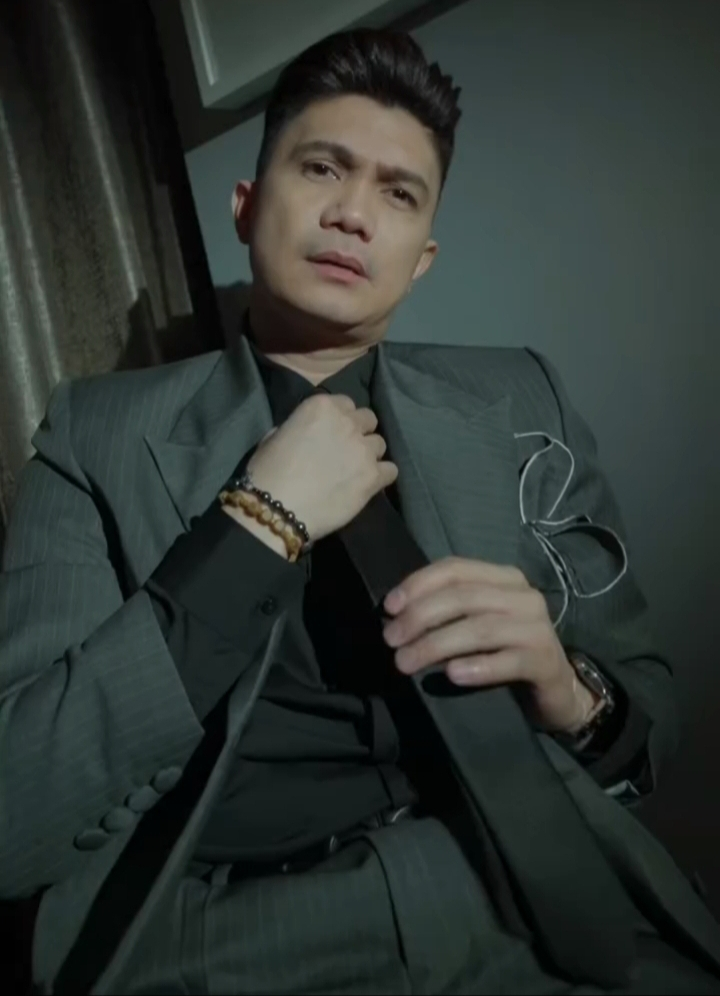
Vhong Navarro

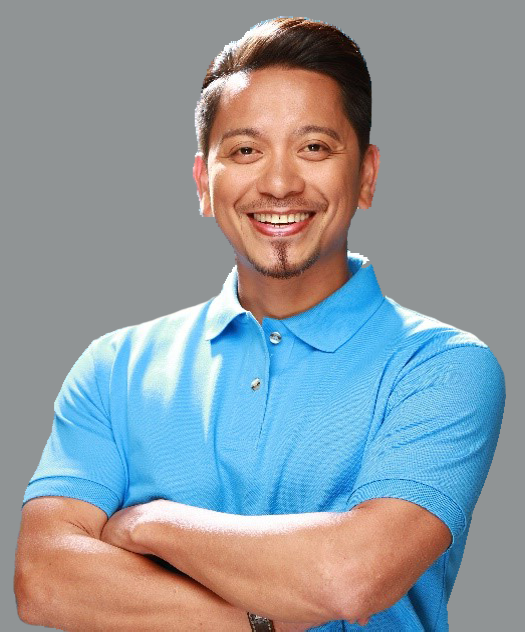
Jhong Hilario

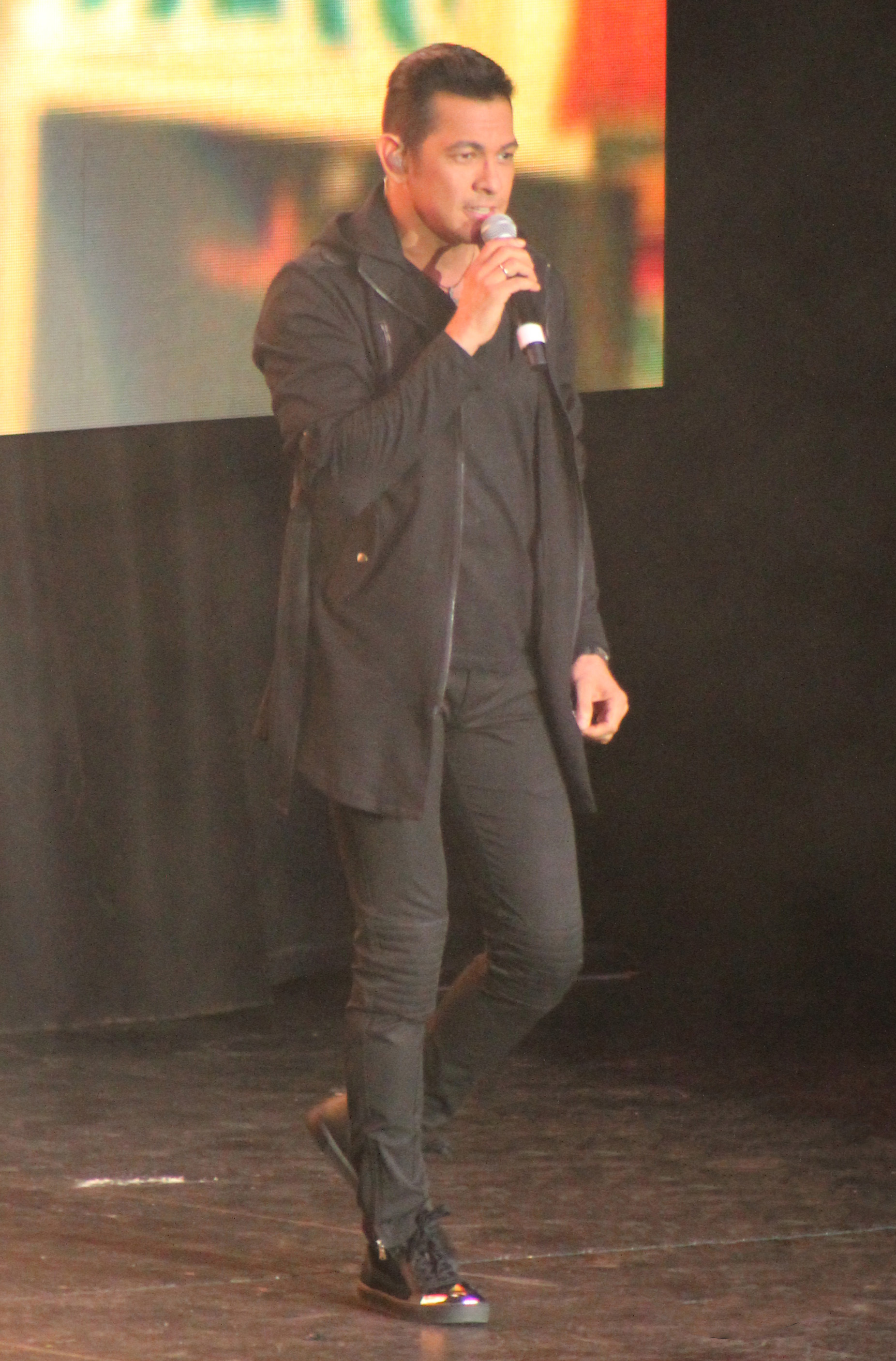
Gary Valenciano

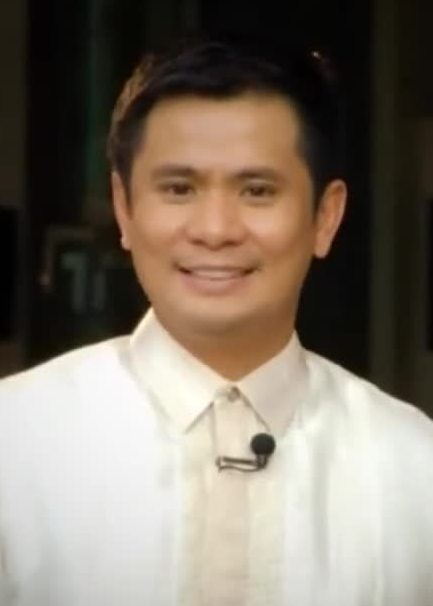
Ogie Alcasid

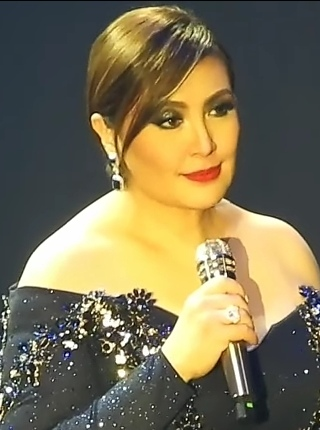
Sharon Cuneta

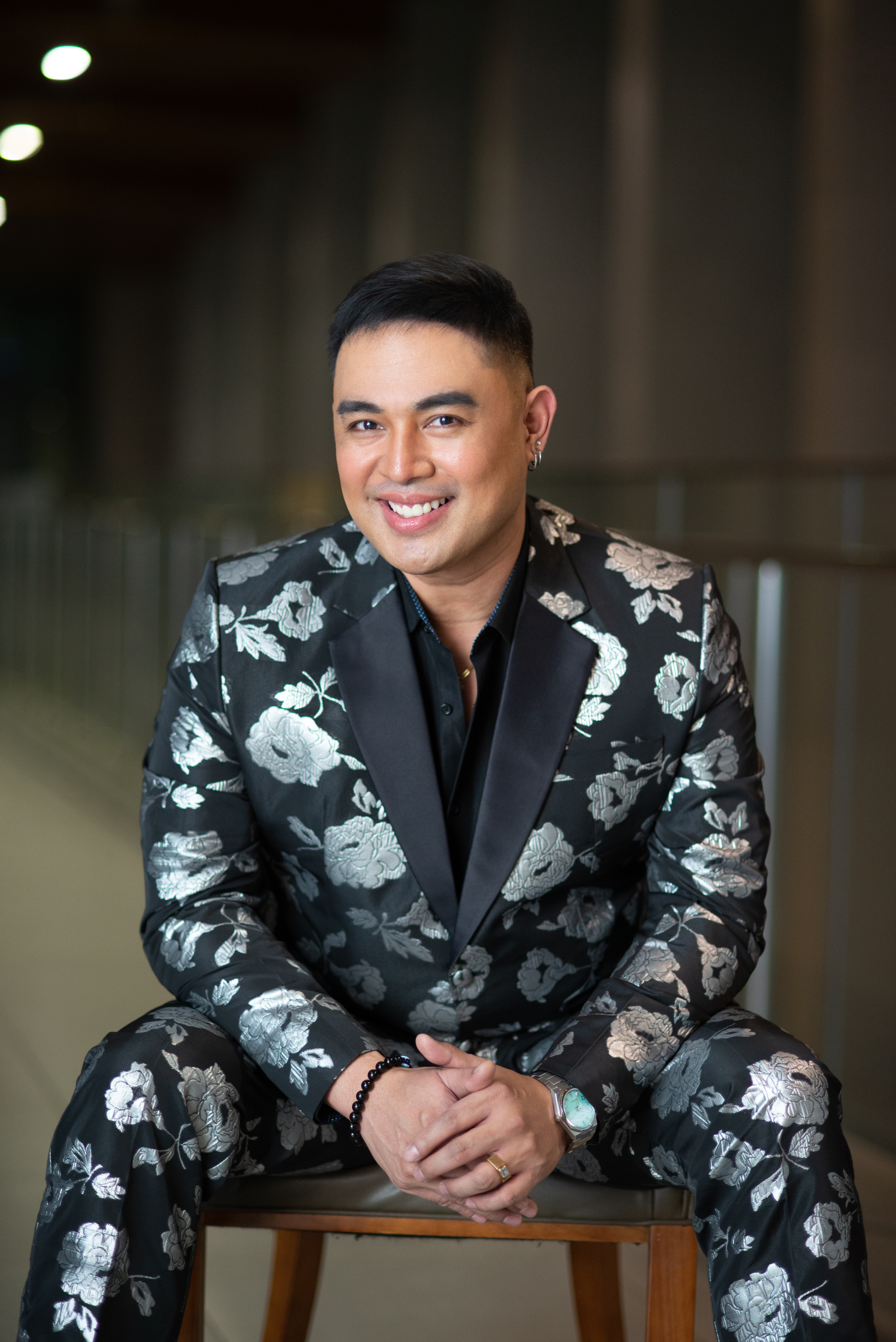
Jed Madela

=== The Jury ===
The panel of judges in this show is called "The Jury". In each season, there are usually three members of the jury. For season 1, Jed Madela, Gary Valenciano, and Toni Gonzaga were the initial members of the jury. However, after Sharon Cuneta returned to the network on March 9, 2015, she took Gonzaga's place on the panel. All three panelists would reprise their roles in season 2.

If a sitting jury member cannot fulfill their duties for a particular week, a temporary replacement will take their place in that particular week.

=== Hosts ===
Billy Crawford served as the host of Your Face Sounds Familiar during the first two seasons. The winner of the first season, Melai Cantiveros, co-hosted the show along Crawford in season 2. However, since Crawford left ABS-CBN after the said network lost its franchise, Luis Manzano hosted the third season. For the fourth season, Vhong Navarro and Jhong Hilario will serve as the hosts.

=== Mentors ===
Annie Quintos of The Company and Georcelle Dapat-Sy of G-Force serve as mentors for vocals and choreography, respectively, in the first two seasons. In the third season, Madela replaced Quintos, while season 1 finalist Nyoy Volante replaced Dapat-Sy. In the fourth season, season 3 winner Klarisse de Guzman replaced Madela.

=== Cast timeline ===
Color key

Host
Judge
Guest Judge
Contestant
Mentor

Cast Member	Seasons			
Cast Member	1	2	3	4
Billy Crawford	●	●		
Sharon Cuneta	●	●	●	●
Jed Madela	●	●	●	
Gary Valenciano	●	●	●	●
Boy Abunda	●	●		
Annie Quintos	●	●		
Georcelle Dapat-Sy	●	●		
Vice Ganda	●			
Melai Cantiveros	●	●		
Rico J. Puno		●		
Karla Estrada	●	●		●
Randy Santiago		●		
Luis Manzano			●	
Ogie Alcasid			●	●
Nyoy Volante	●		●	●
Jhong Hilario			●	●
Vhong Navarro				●
Klarisse de Guzman			●	●
Erik Santos				●

== Production ==
In February 2015, ABS-CBN announced its acquisition of the Philippine franchise of Your Face Sounds Familiar during its trade show for advertisers in Rockwell Tent, Makati. The first season premiered on March 14, 2015, taking over the timeslot of the second season of The Voice of the Philippines. During the finale of season 1, the show confirmed that it will return for a second season the same year.

In January 2020, ABS-CBN confirmed that the show would return for a third season after Cuneta renewed her contract with the network. However, the plans for the third season was postponed following the implementation of the Enhanced community quarantine in Luzon in response to the COVID-19 pandemic in the Philippines, which prompted the network to suspend its tapings, as well as the shutdown of ABS-CBN free-to-air stations that same year. Production on the season resumed later that year, with the season being confirmed during the 2021 trade launch held during the ABS-CBN Christmas Special in December 2020.

On August 14, 2025, a fourth season was confirmed during the "Iisang Tahanan: Kapamilya Forever Trade Launch.

=== Broadcast ===
On January 2, 2026, the fourth season of the show and other remaining ABS-CBN programs airing on TV5 were transferred to AMBS' All TV, marking its return to channels 2 and 16 in Mega Manila and regional channels previously held by ABS-CBN until 2020. This occurred after TV5 Network decided to terminate its content partnership deal with ABS-CBN, which effectively ceased broadcasting programs produced by the latter on TV5, due to financial disputes involving blocktime fees, which were subsequently settled.

== Series overview ==
Season	Episodes	Originally released		Winner	Second place	Third place	Fourth place	Fifth place	Sixth place	Seventh place
Season	Episodes	First released	Last released	Winner	Second place	Third place	Fourth place	Fifth place	Sixth place	Seventh place
1	25	March 14, 2015	June 7, 2015	Melai Cantiveros	Nyoy Volante	Jay R	Edgar Allan Guzman	None	None	None
2	28	September 12, 2015	December 13, 2015	Denise Laurel	Michael Pangilinan	Sam Concepcion	KZ Tandingan	Kean Cipriano	None	None
3	28	February 20, 2021	May 30, 2021	Klarisse de Guzman	Lie Reposposa	Vivoree Esclito	iDolls	Christian Bables	CJ Navato	Geneva Cruz
4	55	October 4, 2025	April 12, 2026	JMielle	Alexa Ilacad	Jason Dy	Akira Morishita	Jarlo Bâse	Rufa Mae Quinto	Dia Maté

== Spin-off ==
There has been one spin-off of the show, entitled Your Face Sounds Familiar Kids, which features child celebrity performer. As of August 2018, the spin-off has aired for two seasons and produced two winners: Awra Briguela and the TNT Boys.
