= Sine Screen =

- Company type: Subsidiary
- Industry: Independent films
- Founded: 2011
- Headquarters: Quezon City, Philippines
- Parent: ABS-CBN Films

Sine Screen (stylized as Cine Screen) is an independent film division of ABS-CBN Films.

== Filmography ==
- 2011
  - The Adventures of Pureza: Queen of the Riles (July 13) - starring: Melai Cantiveros, Jason Francisco, Joem Bascon, Martin del Rosario and Bianca Manalo; distributed by Star Cinema
- 2012
  - Anino (Not Released) - with Star Magic Workshops
- 2015
  - El Brujo
- 2018
  - Tres (October 3) - starring: Jolo Revilla, Bryan Revilla and Luigi Revilla; co-produced by Imus Productions
- 2019
  - Familia Blondina (February 27) - starring: Karla Estrada, Jobert Austria, Kira Balinger, Marco Gallo, Xia Vigor, Chantal Videla, Shane Weinberg, Awra Briguela, Heaven Peralejo, Negi; co-produced by Arctic Sky Entertainment
  - Man & Wife (May 8) - starring: Gabby Concepcion, Jodi Sta. Maria: co-produced by Cineko Productions
