= Momshies! Ang Soul Mo'y Akin! =

2021 philippine comedy film directed by Easy Ferrer

- Official release poster
- Directed by: Easy Ferrer
- Screenplay by: Easy Ferrer; Daisy Cayanan
- Story by: Easy Ferrer
- Produced by: Enrico C. Santos; Kara U. Kintanar
- Starring: Jolina Magdangal; Melai Cantiveros; Karla Estrada
- Cinematography: Jeyow Evangelista
- Edited by: Chrisel Galeno-Desuasido
- Music by: Tim Marquez
- Production companies: ABS-CBN Film Productions; Keep Filming
- Distributed by: Star Cinema; CineXpress; iWantTFC
- Release date: May 28, 2021
- Country: Philippines
- Language: Filipino

Momshies! Ang Soul Mo'y Akin! is a 2021 Philippine comedy fantasy film directed by Easy Ferrer. It stars Jolina Magdangal, Karla Estrada, Melai Cantiveros, Manuel Chua, Jason Francisco and Thou Reyes.

== Cast ==
- Jolina Magdangal as Jolene / Mylene (switched)
- Karla Estrada as Karlene / Jolene (switched)
- Melai Cantiveros as Mylene / Karlene (switched)
- Manuel Chua as JB
- Jason Francisco as Clark
- Thou Reyes as Kimberly
- JhaiHo as Keng
- Mitoy Yonting as Luke
- Miko Gallardo as Jeremiah
- Juliana Parizcova Segovia as Pipay
- Pia Moran as Amanda
- Eris Aragoza as Banchong
- Francis Mata as Lolo
- Johannes Rissler as Nectar
- Sunshine Teodoro as Jolene's Mom
- Gabo Adeva as Beyo / Albularyo
- Jervi Li as KaladKaren Davila
- Dean Airo Salvador Dancel as Wally
- Marvin Agustin as Wally (voice)
- Loi Villarama as Board Member Head
- Cheryl Cabanos as Luke's Mistress
- Melai Entuna as Wally's Fiancée
- Leilani Kate Yalung as Jeremiah's New Girlfriend
- Rica Castaño as News Reporter / Wedding Guest
- Yuan Isles as Salon Hair Stylist / Talkshow Staff and Crew

== Production ==
Momshies! Ang Soul Mo'y Akin! was directed by Easy Ferrer under ABS-CBN Film Productions (Star Cinema) and Keep Filming. The film features three friends who had their bodies swapped. The film's protagonists were portrayed by Jolina Magdangal, Melai Cantiveros, Karla Estrada, who in real life are long-time friends. The three co-hosts in Magandang Buhay, where they affectionally call each other "momshies". Production of the film occurred during the COVID-19 pandemic, which meant that certain health protocols and restrictions had to be observed.

== Release ==
The film was released in the Philippines via streaming in KTX.ph and iWantTFC on May 28, 2021.

== Reception ==
LionhearTV gave the film a 3 out of 5 rating and wrote:

True to its publicity, the Momshies’ launching film is akin to most MMFF family-comedy films’ chaotic humor and convoluted scripts. Nevertheless, Momshies, Ang Soul Mo’y Akin, is not a terrible film.
