= The Adventures of Pureza: Queen of the Riles =

The Adventures of Pureza
- Theatrical film poster
- Directed by: Soxie H. Topacio
- Screenplay by: Gina Marissa Tagasa
- Story by: Enrico C. Santos
- Produced by: Charo Santos-Concio; Malou N. Santos; Enrico C. Santos
- Starring: Melai Cantiveros; Jason Francisco; Joem Bascon; Martin del Rosario; Bianca Manalo
- Cinematography: Mackie Galvez
- Edited by: Beng Bandong
- Music by: Vince de Jesus
- Production company: Sine Screen
- Distributed by: ABS-CBN Film Productions (Note: Distributed under the joint label, Star Cinema/ABS-CBN Film Productions.)
- Release date: July 13, 2011
- Running time: 105 minutes
- Country: Philippines
- Languages: Filipino; English
- Box office: ₱19,844,817.00

The Adventures of Pureza: Queen of the Riles is a 2011 Filipino comedy film directed by Soxie H. Topacio and starring Melai Cantiveros as Pureza. The film was produced by Sine Screen and Star Cinema. The film had a limited release on July 13, 2011.

== Plot ==
A poor girl, by the name of Pura who lives near the rails of the train experiences fun, adventure, and romance, in the greatest adventure of her life. Together with her friend, Ruben, they try to find a model, by the name of Daniella Fabella Dela Bamba. If they did not succeed, they will be killed by the evil Mother Baby/Mother Greedy, and the Tsinelas gang. In search, Pura meets a boy by the name of Gerald, and falls in love with him. However, Gerald does not return her feelings, because he is in love with Daniella who is pregnant. Pura finds her mother, Purisima, who is currently a nun in a cathedral. Her mother helps her escape Mother Baby's guards. Sooner, Pura also learns that her best friend, Ruben, is in love with her, and falls in love with him in the process. When Mother Baby is defeated, she and Ruben get married, in the Train Station.

== Cast ==
- Melai Cantiveros as Pura Buraot/Pureza Mayriles/Sor. Eyes
- Jason Francisco as Ruben Padilla/Sor. Throat
- Joem Bascon as Gerald Tanderson
- Martin del Rosario as Ulam Buraot/ Ulysses Buraot
- Bianca Manalo as Daniella Fabella de la Bamba
- Gina Pareño as Mother Baby/Mother Greedy
- Nico Antonio as Hipon
- Bella Flores as Sr.Pepa Papparazzi
- Bentong as mother baby's guard
- Gerard Acao as mother baby's guard
- Pokwang as Sr.Purisima
- Bekimon as Zeppy

== Reception ==
The film garnered P19,844,817 in its 4-week of showing. It was in direct competition against Harry Potter and the Deathly Hallows – Part 2, in the Philippine box office.
