= Pinoy Big Brother: Double Up =

- Season 3
- Presented by: Toni Gonzaga; Bianca Gonzalez; Mariel Rodriguez
- No. of days: 133
- No. of housemates: 26
- Winner: Melisa Cantiveros
- Runner-up: Paul Jake Castillo

Release
- Original network: ABS-CBN
- Original release: October 4, 2009 – February 13, 2010

Season chronology
- ← Previous; Season 2 Next → Unlimited

The third season of the reality game show Pinoy Big Brother, subtitled "Double Up" aired on ABS-CBN for 133 days from October 4, 2009 to February 13, 2010.

This is the third civilian season and the seventh season overall to air on the network. This season broke the previous civilian season's record for the longest stay of housemates inside the house by only one week.

After 133 days, Melisa Cantiveros emerged as the winner of this season. Paul Jake Castillo was the runner-up, while Jason Francisco, Johan Santos, and Steve "Tibo" Jumalon were the finalists.

== Overview ==
=== Auditions ===
There were two sets of auditions for this season. The first set was held in late 2007 at several cities in the Philippines, as well as the cities of Madrid, Milan, and Dubai. Those auditions also produced the housemates for Pinoy Big Brother: Teen Edition Plus. A second series of auditions, which included selections for the third Teen Edition, were held in several key cities in the Philippines and the cities of Tokyo and San Francisco. An estimated 57,824 people attended the auditions. From those two auditions, only 50 people were reportedly chosen for the shortlist. A total of 26 housemates entered the House, with 14 on Day 1 and ten on Day 7. The last two housemates entered on Day 43.

=== Hosts ===
Toni Gonzaga, Mariel Rodriguez, and Bianca Gonzalez reprised their hosting duties this season.

Companion shows

This season also marked the return of Pinoy Big Brother UpLate, after being replaced by Pinoy Big Brother Über in the second Celebrity Edition and Pinoy Big Brother: Teen Edition Plus. Mariel continued hosting Über while Bianca took the helm for UpLate. Episodes from the previous week were also recapped through a weekend program on Studio 23 entitled Pinoy Big Brother: Primetime Weekends on 23 and delayed, but unedited late morning/early afternoon feed through Pinoy Big Brother: Raw on Studio 23.

=== House theme ===
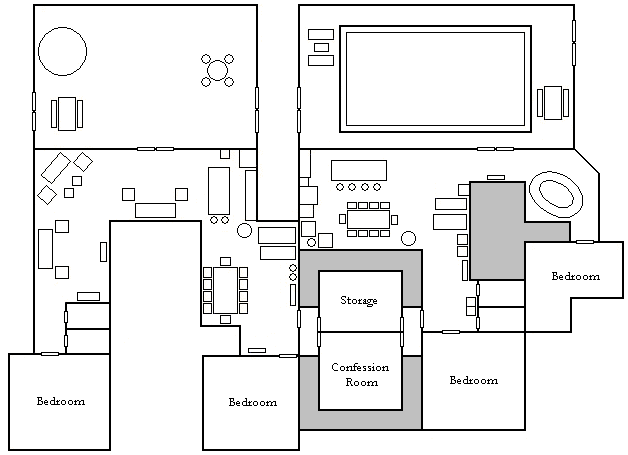
House A, with the swimming pool, is located on the right side while House B is on the left side.

With the Double-up twist of having two houses, the houses have a European motif for interiors with bright colors as inspired by architectural designs of Antoni Gaudí for House A and Vincent Van Gogh's paintings for House B. The houses appear to be smaller than before, with each house having the same set of amenities with different wall paintings. House A has predominantly blue and green wall paintings. House B has predominantly red and yellow wall paintings. Furthermore, House A's garden inherits the infinity pool previously seen in Teen Edition: Plus and the second season of Pinoy Dream Academy; House B only has a simple terrace area with a jacuzzi at one side.

=== Prizes ===
The winner of the new season received an LCD TV set, an Asian tour package, a business package, a house and lot, and ₱1,000,000. The winner also donated another ₱1,000,000 to a charity of their choice, making Double Up the first non-celebrity season to do so.

While the 2nd, 3rd, 4th, and 5th big placers received ₱500,000, ₱300,000, ₱200,000, and ₱100,000 in cash respectively. The same amounts are also received by their chosen charities, and they also get a laptop as an additional prize.

=== Twists ===
==== Double Up twists ====
Aside from having two Houses, the season was dubbed "Double-Up" for several reasons:

- Double-Up Housemates - Two sets of identical twins were included in the roster of housemates - with each member of the twins living in both parts of the house, switching between the two areas when instructed. However, the rest of the housemates do not know about the twins, or the fact that there are two houses. The twins will also receive immunity from nomination for eviction during the first nomination night if they succeed in keeping this a secret, but if they do reveal it they will be forcibly evicted.
- House Swaps - Housemates are made to swap houses and group members as instructed by Big Brother.
  - Bagyong Walay (Typhoon Apart) - Big Brother instructed female housemates from Houses A and B to swap houses.
  - Bagyong Isa (Typhoon Unite) - Housemates from both houses will be staying in one house. Fourteen housemates should survive Vote To Evict in order for them to stay in one house.

==== Other twists ====
- Vote To Evict - The public is given the power to vote to evict a housemate. The housemate with the highest percentage of votes to evict will be evicted at the end of the week. This was only implemented on the fifth eviction night.
- Save-Evict Voting System - The public saves a housemate, and at the same time, evict a housemate. The housemate with the combined percentage of both save and evict votes combined is evicted.
- Big Brother Swap - Carrying on from the second regular season, a Filipino housemate would temporarily trade places with a housemate from another active Big Brother season abroad (see below).
- Head of Household and Hand Grenade - The Head of Household twist is once again used with the Hand Grenade as the new addition. Both were implemented after the housemates began living in one house. The Hand Grenade goes to the ultimate loser in the HOH competition. See Head of Household and Hand Grenade sections for further details.
- Char-Char Change - Big Brother made a fake announcement that public voting is discontinued and the housemates themselves will vote among the nominees for who should be evicted, but the ultimate fate will still be decided by the public. Big Brother used this system to show each housemate's true feelings toward their fellow housemates. The name of the twist is a play on Charter change and "Char-Char," which is Filipino slang for "false."
- House Players - Evicted or former housemate/s will return to the house to test the remaining official housemates through tasks set by Big Brother and the audience.
- The Big Jump to the Big Night - The seven remaining housemates will undergo a series of challenges. The overall winner will be granted permanent immunity from nominations and automatic inclusion into the Big Night.
- The White Room - Two of the six remaining housemates would undergo an endurance challenge in a purely white room for a chance to win a brand-new house and lot. A housemate would lose the challenge if he or she pressed a red button somewhere in the room.

==== Finale twists ====
- Big Five - Big Brother decided to put five housemates in contention for the Big Winner title instead of the standard four; the "Fifth Big Placer" would get PHP100,000 as his prize and the same amount for his chosen charity.
- Big Reveal - For the first time in the franchise's history, the actual ranking of the finalists were revealed to the public before the Big Night. This happened on Day 129.

== Housemates ==
There were a total of twenty-six housemates - twenty official housemates, four sub-official housemates, and two replacement housemates, who entered the Houses: the first set of 14 housemates entered on Day 1 (October 4, 2009), while a second set of 10 were introduced on Day 7 (October 10, 2009). A third batch of two housemates entered the house on Day 43 (November 15, 2009). They are divided below by the batch from which they were introduced and House in which they live. The ages indicated were the housemates' ages upon their entrance to the house. A table is included to show the housemates shifted houses in the duration of the show.

The first batch of housemates entered the Houses on Day 1 (October 4, 2009) in the order shown. They appeared and disappeared from stage with the use of several magic tricks, with a Magic-themed kick-off. Filipino-American artist Amber Davis sang the theme song, with ex-housemates Jason Gainza, Cassandra Ponti and Franzen Fajardo from Season 1, Niña Jose from Teen Edition 1, and Wendy Valdez and Gee-Ann Abrahan from Season 2.

The second batch of Housemates entered the Big Brother House on Day 7 (October 10, 2009), during another special show called "The Spooktacular Reveal," utilizing a haunted house theme. Housemates were escorted by hosts Bianca and Mariel to the front door of the house. While the 10 housemates in the two houses danced to the tune of Thriller, outside the house, present were Big Winners and ex-housemates Nene Tamayo from Season 1, John Prats from Celebrity Edition 1, Beatriz Saw and Mickey Perz from Season 2, Robi Domingo from Teen Edition Plus, and the recently evicted Double-up housemates Kenny and Toffi Santos and JM Lagumbay.

On Day 41 (November 13, 2009), right after Big Brother announced Tom's forced eviction to the housemates, primetime edition host Toni Gonzaga revealed that new housemate(s) - confirmed during the following night's broadcast as a guy and a girl - would enter the house. The new housemates entered on Day 43 (November 15, 2009).

Name	Age on entry	Hometown	Entered	Exited	Result	Refs.
Melisa "Melai" Cantiveros	21	General Santos	Day 1	Day 133	Winner	—
Paul Jake Castillo	24	Metro Cebu	Day 1	Day 133	Runner-up	—
Jason Francisco	21	Oriental Mindoro	Day 1	Day 133	3rd Place	—
Johan Santos	22	Quezon City	Day 7	Day 133	4th Place	—
Steve "Tibo" Jumalon	33	Cagayan de Oro	Day 7	Day 133	5th Place	—
Mariel Sorino	21	Davao City	Day 1	Day 126	Evicted	—
Kath Lopeña-Ortega	24	Spain	Day 7	Day 119	Evicted	
Hermes Bautista	23	Pampanga	Day 7	Day 112	Evicted	—
Cathy Remperas	22	Bohol	Day 7	Day 105	Evicted	—
Sam Pinto	19	Parañaque	Day 43	Day 98	Evicted	—
Rica Paras	26	Iloilo	Day 7	Day 91	Evicted	—
Patrick Villanueva	32	Baguio	Day 7	Day 84	Evicted	
Carol Batay	22	Tondo, Manila	Day 1	Day 77	Evicted	
Rocky Salumbides	29	Cavite	Day 43	Day 67	Voluntary exit	
Yuri Okawa	25	Tokyo, Japan	Day 1	Day 64	Evicted	
Rob Stumvoll	24	Austria	Day 7	Day 56	Evicted	
Riza Mae Patria	23	Siquijor	Day 7	Day 49	Evicted	
Tom Rodriguez	22	Samar / Arizona, U.S.	Day 1	Day 42	Forced eviction	
Delio Dimaculangan	26	Batangas	Day 1	Day 35	Evicted	
Yhel Punzalan	26	Pampanga	Day 1	Day 26	Forced eviction	—
Princess Manzon	22	Metro Cebu / Fukuoka, Japan	Day 1	Day 22	Voluntary exit	
Jimson Ortega	25	Spain	Day 7	Day 21	Evicted	
JM Lagumbay	29	Quezon City	Day 1	Day 5	Forced eviction	—
Kenny Santos	20	Rizal	Day 1	Day 5	Forced eviction	—
Toffi Santos	20	Rizal	Day 1	Day 5	Forced eviction	—
JP Lagumbay	29	Quezon City	Day 1	Day 3	Voluntary exit	

=== House stay history ===
Housemates
Name	Initial House		Week 4 House		Week 6 House		Week 8 House	Day 63/64 House		Day 105/107 House		Day 112/119 House	Final Week	
Melisa	B	A	B		B	A	B	B	A	A		A	A	
Paul Jake	A		B		B	A	A	A		A		A	B	A
Jason	A		B		B	A	A	A		A		A	B	A
Johan	A		B		B	A	A	A		A		A	B	A
Tibo	A		B		B	A	A	A		A		A	A	
Mariel	B		A		A	B	A	A		A		A	Out	
Kath	B		A		A	B	A	A		A		A	Out	
Hermes	B		A		A	B	B	B	A	A		Out		
Cathy	A		B		B	A	B	A		B (Re-entered)		Out		
Sam	Not in House					B	A	A		Out				
Rica	A		B		B	A	B	B	A	B (Re-entered)		A	Out	
Patrick	B		A		A	B	B	A		B (Re-entered)		Out		
Carol	B		A	B	B	A	B	B	A	Out				
Rocky	Not in House					B	B	A		Out				
Yuri	B		A		A	B	A	B	Out	B (Re-entered)		A	Out	
Rob	A		B	A	A	B	B	Out		B (Re-entered)		Out		
Patria	B		A		A	B	Out							
Tom	A	B	A		A	B	Out			B (Re-entered)	Out			
Delio	A		B		Out					B (Re-entered)		Out		
Yhel	B		A		Out									
Princess	A		Out							B (Re-entered)		A	Out	
Jimson	B		Out											
Toffi	B	A	Out											
Kenny	A	B	Out								B (Re-entered)	Out		
JM	B	A	Out											
JP	A	B	Out											

== Big Brother Swap ==
Swap Housemates Cathy from the Philippines (upper left) and Kätlin from Finland (right) finally meet through Skype.

It was announced by the program on Day 21 (October 24, 2009) that another Big Brother Swap would take place. This time, one from either House would trade places with another housemate from another foreign edition of Big Brother. This would also be the second time that Pinoy Big Brother linked up with other foreign versions of the show, Season 2 being the first, when housemate Bruce Quebral traded places with Tina Semolič from the first season of Big Brother Slovenia.

On Day 26, it was announced by the host that the show would be swapping housemates with Big Brother Finland's fifth season. On October 29, 2009, ABS-CBN Entertainment's YouTube channel, iABS-CBN, uploaded a video confirming that the housemate from Big Brother Finland who will swap places in the Philippines is Kätlin Laas (video), a 22-year-old food processing plant worker originally from Rakvere, Estonia but migrated to Finland at the age of 16, and is currently living in Seinäjoki, Finland. On Day 27, it was announced that Cathy from Group A, then currently living in House B, would be swapping with Kätlin and would be going to Finland to live in their Big Brother House for a week. Cathy's selection was made through a series of tasks on which the housemates underwent on the watchful eyes of the Finnish producers.

Kätlin left the Big Brother Finland House on Day 26 (Day 66 of the Finnish version) and enter either Philippine House on Day 29 (Day 69 of the Finnish version). She was supposed to arrive in the Philippines and enter either House the day before, but her flight was delayed due to weather disturbances caused by Typhoon Santi. Hours before her entrance, she had a brief appearance on the show The Buzz. On the other hand, Cathy was supposed to leave in the morning of Day 28 (Day 68 of the Finnish version) but their flight was postponed to a later hour of the day.

Much like the first Big Swap, events from both Houses are chronicled. Also, all conversations in English are subtitled in Filipino and all Finnish conversations and confessions are dubbed over by Filipino voice actors. For the Finnish version, clips from the Philippine house are shown in the Big Brother Extra show, while conversations in English are subtitled in Suomi.

The Big Swap started on the evening of Day 29 (Day 69 of the Finnish version). Kätlin initially stayed in House A upon her arrival on Day 29. She transferred to House B on Day 31. On Day 32, Cathy and Kätlin were finally able to meet through a video call through Skype. Later that day, Kätlin returned to House A. She left the Philippine House on the morning of Day 34 (early morning of Day 74 of the Finnish version). She was briefly interviewed for the morning show Umagang Kay Ganda just after stepping outside the front door. Meanwhile, Cathy entered on the evening of Day 69 of the Finnish version (early morning of Day 30 of the Philippines version). She left six days later on the evening of Day 74 of the Finnish version (early morning of Day 35 of the Philippine version), signaling the end of the Big Swap.

Kätlin left the Philippines the same day she left the Pinoy Big Brother house and re-entered their house in the early morning of Day 75 of the Finnish version (Day 35 of the Philippine version). Cathy left Finland the morning after she left the Finnish Big Brother house and re-entered the Pinoy Big Brother house on the evening of Day 36 (Day 76 of the Finnish version).

Below is a list of activities each swapped housemate did in their respective host country's Houses, aside from introductions and trading of basic phrases:

Kätlin	In House A: Had a tropical-themed welcoming party.; Learned and sang the song Maalaala Mo Kaya (Will You Remember in English), together with Tom.; Participated in a water soccer game in which her team won (with Rob, Tom and Yuri) and ate Filipino exotic foods (frog legs, crickets, balut, fried worms and snails) as a reward. Patria acted as referee.; In House B: Brought plov, an Estonian dish, which is like a casserole with rice, beef or lamb, onions, carrots and ketchup.; Learned the dance Pandanggo sa Ilaw with the housemates.; Participated in a parlor game involving inline skates and her country's flag, where her team, an all-female team, lost. Tibo acted as referee.; Acted as referee in several spider fighting matches.; Had a jacuzzi party with Filipino street food (chicken head, chicken feet and chicken blood to name a few) foods, vodka and palm wine (locally known as tuba).; As instructed by Big Brother's Finnish counterpart, Kätlin taught a Finnish song Ihmisten Edessä (In Front of People in English), and had to choreograph a corresponding dance with the housemates.
Cathy	Played a game called pököpallo, invented by the Finnish housemates, a game similar to the French game pétanque.; Had a sauna and jacuzzi welcoming party.; Learned and sang the song ‘’Sininen Ja Valkoinen’’ (Blue and White in English), together with all the Finnish housemates.; Learned different winter sports and activities, including cross-country skiing, ice fishing, ice hockey, floorball and pesäpallo or Finnish baseball, Finland's national sport, demonstrated by Antti, Aso and Sampo.; Had an Asian dinner with the housemates.; Experienced her first snow fall. Her housemates made a snowman for her, which she named Chuva Choo Choo.; Taught the housemates the Wowowee game Hep Hep, Hooray.; Cooked Adobo for the Finnish housemates.; Served as the judge in the Head of Household competition, which involved the housemates singing Sininen Ja Valkoinen.; Had a Christmas dinner with the housemates.

Also, both Philippine and Finnish houses had weekly tasks involving housemates doing a 30-minute cultural variety show portraying their countries' cultures to their visitors. The Filipino housemates should include Kätlin in their presentation while the Finnish housemates should work four at a time in the upstairs room while Cathy is not around. However, it was later revealed that the real weekly task of the Filipino housemates is to make Kätlin feel the Filipino hospitality, to which she felt that both houses were friendly, yet she felt more warmth with House A.

More than three weeks after the Swap ended, on Day 97 of the fifth Finnish season, Kätlin was proclaimed as second placer, behind Aso.

== The Three Kings ==
On Day 71 (December 13, 2009), Big Brother designated Hermes, Johan, and Patrick as the three kings, which were tasked to designate the ten stars containing gifts to the ten other housemates in the house.

- 1st Gift: Aral ng Pagpapakumbaba (Lesson In Humility) (Day 71) - the housemate had to live, sleep and eat in a kariton, a wooden pushcart for three days (given to Paul Jake)
- 2nd Gift: Aral sa Pagtitipid ng Damit (Lesson on Frugality in Clothing) (Day 71) - the housemate had to wear a bahag, the native clothing of the Ifugao, for three days (given to Tibo)
- 3rd Gift: Date with a Celebrity (Day 72) - the housemate had to act like a refined Filipino, in exchange for a date with a favorite celebrity (given to Melisa)
- 4th Gift: Aral ng Pagtitipid sa Pagkain (Lesson on Frugality in Food) (Day 73) - the housemate will have to eat nothing but sweet potatoes for three days (given to Rica)
- 5th Gift: Washing Machine (Day 73) - the housemate had to wash the other housemates' clothes while they are still wearing them, in exchange for a washing machine and dryer (given to Carol)
- 6th Gift: Digicam (Day 74) - given to a housemate who likes to pose in front of the cameras inside the house. The recipient must teach a certain housemate (Carol) how to walk like a fashion model. (given to Cathy)
- 7th Gift: Aral sa Pagtitipid ng Tubig (Lesson on Frugality in Water) (Day 75) - the housemate has to keep herself from taking a bath (in the bathroom or in the swimming pool) (given to Sam)
- 8th Gift: Malaman ang Katotohanan (To Know the Truth) (Day 76) - each of the three kings will give one nomination point to a common housemate and directly explain their reasons. (given to Kath)
- 9th Gift: Tricycle (Day 86) - the housemate will become a house servant for four days, where he needs to do all the chores of the house and must obey everything the other housemates tell him to do. The housemate will also be the first to wake up and the last to sleep. These sacrifices will be in exchange for a tricycle. For every mistake the housemate makes, a part of the tricycle will be removed. (given to Jason)
- 10th Gift: Laptop (Day 93) - the housemate would become a teacher to Dengue and two other "mischievous classmates" (namely Clownie and Chacky) which are actually dolls for three days. (given to Mariel)

== Ex-Housemate Entries ==
=== German ex-housemate visit ===
On Day 76 (December 18, 2009), the program announced that an ex-housemate from a European Big Brother franchise will visit the Pinoy Big Brother house for the holidays, which they dubbed as Super G (known for having G-cup-sized breasts). On Day 78 (December 20, 2009), it was revealed that Annina Ucatis from the ninth season of Big Brother Germany will be the visitor, which aims to spice up the housemates' Christmas. Due to weather problems, Annina's scheduled entry on Day 79 (December 21, 2009) was postponed. She left Germany in the evening of Day 79. Annina entered the house in the evening of Day 80, in a giant gift box, during Paul Jake's birthday.

On Day 84, before the eviction, Sascha, an ex-housemate from the same season as Annina's and also Annina's current boyfriend, entered the house to fetch Annina.

While she was in the Pinoy Big Brother House, Annina did the following tasks:

Annina	Task 1: With Tibo as mentor, Annina had to learn target shooting and pass Big Brother's test (Day 80); Task 2: Learn how to make puto-bumbong with Patrick (Day 81); Task 3: Learn a Spanish dance from Kath. She was partnered with Hermes while Kath was partnered with Johan (Day 82); Task 4: Make a skirt with Sam as mentor (Day 82); The housemates must compete in a limbo competition in the swimming pool where Annina was partnered with Hermes. She also acted as chaperone to the parent housemates' children in preparation for their 100-second encounters. (Day 81)
Housemates	In 1 hour, the housemates had to learn a German Christmas Carol. From Jason, the Christmas Carol was passed one-by-one to each housemate where Annina was the judge. In exchange, the kids of the parent housemates will get a gift from Big Brother. (Day 80)

=== Resbak Attack twist ===
On Day 105 (January 16, 2010), after Cathy's eviction, the show announced a new twist involving ex-housemates re-entering House B to compete with the remaining housemates. Cathy, the latest evictee, was instructed by Big Brother to move to House B instead of formally exiting the Pinoy Big Brother House. Princess, Delio, Tom, Rob, Yuri, Patrick and Rica joined Cathy at House B. Tom later voluntary exited and was replaced by Kenny. These eight ex-housemates competed with the remaining eight housemates with the pot money of the Big Four at stake. From the name itself, the ex-housemates had the task of seeking revenge on the remaining eight housemates.

=== Kuya's Darlings ===
As an added twist, on Day 112, when Cathy, Delio, Kenny, Patrick and Rob were given their honorable dismissal from their Resbak Attack duties, Princess, Rica and Yuri were recommissioned by Big Brother to take part in another twist. The three housemates will serve as House Players. For each task they accomplished, each one will be getting PHP 5,000, plus a laptop computer for the final task. The tasks will either be voted upon by the public or ordered by Big Brother. The three ex-housemates were to act returning housemates in exchange for the three eggs broken the week before. Below are the tasks decided upon by viewers:

Task No.	Day announced	Description	Options	Viewers' selection	Result
1	Day 116 (January 26, 2010)	Rica should make which housemate cry?	Paul Jake, Johan, Jason	Paul Jake	Completed
2	Day 117 (January 27, 2010)	To which housemate should Princess ask for love advice?	Melisa, Kath, Mariel	Mariel	Completed
3	Day 118 (January 28, 2010)	To which housemate should Yuri offer a jacuzzi date?	Tibo, Johan, Jason	Johan	Completed
4	Day 119 (January 29, 2010)	The Kuya's Darlings must hide the housemates' items that has sentimental value.	Non-voted		Completed

== Weekly tasks ==
Both houses do the same weekly task. By the end of the week, Big Brother assesses each house. Assessment would depend whether the task is a competition between two houses or each house would be assessed on its own. If the task is a competition, the winning house gets their allowance for the upcoming week while the losing house gets no money.

Group A housemates are housemates initially from House A while Group B housemates are housemates initially from House B, with the exception of Tom, originally part of House A, and Melisa, originally part of House B, who were swapped by Big Brother before the end of the first weekly task. For the fourth weekly task, the housemates swapped houses, and Rob and Carol swapped groups.

For the sixth weekly task, aside from the weekly budget, the winning house only had the housemate/s with the highest point as its nominee/s for the following week while the losing house had the housemates with the top three different points as its nominees. As a reward in the fourth and last challenge, the Group A got their clothes and the house of their choice.

For the seventh weekly task, aside from the weekly budget, the winning house will only have the housemate/s with the highest point as its nominee/s and also be able to give one housemate from the losing house an automatic nomination. As winners, Group B got their clothes.

Before the eighth weekly task started, the females of each group swap houses. Males from Group A and females from Group B were to be known as "Neo-Group A" while females from Group A and males from Group B were to be known as "Neo-Group B".

Task No.	Date given	Description	Group A Result	Group B Result
1	October 5, 2009 (Day 02)	The Hot Seat; Once the Getting to Know You tune plays, one housemate has to go to the Hot Seat where his/her housemates will ask questions. Only when they hear the tune again can they stop the task. By the end of the week, the housemates should get a particular collective grade to win the task.	Passed	Failed
2	October 10, 2009 (Day 07)	Secret Relationships; Patrick must assume Jimson's place as Kath's husband as the three of them enter House B. Rob and Rica will join the housemates in House A and must act as they are in a relationship. The result will determine whether the housemates will get their weekly budget or not.	Passed	Failed^{T1}
3	October 18, 2009 (Day 15)	TakFan Mo Dance; The housemates are assigned to replicate the fan dance number of a music video from the DJ Ozma song Drinking Boys. Each house would have a starting score. Each housemate who opts to go naked will have 50 points for the house while 20 for those who would wear a T-back bikini. However, housemates who have issues with the two daring options can go for a flesh-colored bodysuit without any extra points being given. The lower part will be covered by a smiley sticker, which would result in a 15-point deduction from the team's total every time it (or part of) is revealed. The word TakFan is a play on the Tagalog word takpan (to cover up).^{T2}	Passed	Failed
4	October 26, 2009 (Day 23)	This is Stitch; In connection with the Big Brother Swap, the housemates are given a pattern to which they have to do a Cross-stitch weaving, with the colors of their choice. Assessment would be done by the Swapped Finnish housemate Kätlin and her choice would also determine the House where she would take up residence.^{T3} The title is a play of This is It.	Failed	Passed
5	November 2, 2009 (Day 30)	Cultural Variety Show; The housemates had to prepare a 30-minute variety show which portrays the Filipino culture.^{T4} Its actual purpose was for Kätlin to determine which group exhibited Filipino hospitality the most towards her.	Failed	Passed
6	November 8, 2009 (Day 36)	Pinoy Big Battle; The houses will face-off in five different challenges. As warm-up, a rap session will start each game. The group who would win the majority of the games will be declared the champion.^{T5}	Passed	Failed
7	November 14, 2009 (Day 42)	The Skill-ing Bee; The houses will face-off in five different skill-based challenges. A guest will be invited to serve as a judge in each task. The team who triumphs in most of the games will be declared the overall winner and be given a chance to automatically nominate a housemate from the losing team. The title of the weekly task is a play of ABS-CBN show The Singing Bee.	Failed	Passed
			Neo-Group A Result	Neo-Group B Result
8	November 23, 2009 (Day 51)	PBB Double UpLoad; The housemates in each House will have to make a three-minute viral video which would be uploaded in the Pinoy Big Brother Multiply website. The video with the most number of views wins the task.^{T6}	Failed	Passed
9	November 29, 2009 (Day 57)	O-versus; The housemates will undergo one-on-one challenges with the housemates of the other house. A running total is kept after each round, with the house with the most points after five games winning.	Passed	Failed
			Housemates' Result	
10	December 7, 2009 (Day 65)	Ang Baristas; The housemates were divided into pairs. Each pair were to perform two routines, one of the first three routines and the last routine taught by the guest bartenders.^{T7} (50% of weekly allowance)	Failed	
11	December 13, 2009 (Day 71)	Inter-Big Brother Competition; The housemates were assigned to make sculptures out of various food items and would compete against the housemates of a fake Indian Big Brother franchise. This aims to test the housemates' competitiveness, nationalism and teamwork. (100% of weekly allowance)	Passed	
12	December 23, 2009 (Day 81)	Exchange Gifts; The housemates were to teach Annina four tasks, in exchange for four tasks which Annina will be teaching them.^{T8} (100% of weekly allowance)	Passed	
13	December 26, 2009 (Day 85)	Pinoy Big Blast; The housemates were assigned to organize a concert they will all perform in during the eviction night on January 2, 2010. They can only make ten or less mistakes or Big Brother would declare the task a failure.^{T9}	Failed	
14	January 4, 2010 (Day 92)	2,010; The housemates can only sleep for a maximum of 2,010 minutes (roughly 33 hours) for the entire week and the timer starts once at least one housemate closes their eyes. At the same time, the housemates should hit a sipa washer 2,010 times using any part of their body except their heads.^{T10}	Passed	
15	January 11, 2010 (Day 100)	Balls; The housemates were grouped into three where they were assigned to guess the exact number of yellow, blue, and green balls that were stashed in the middle of House A's oval couch and they cannot take the balls anywhere else rather than in the couch.^{T11}	Failed	
16	January 18, 2010 (Day 106)	Resbak Attack; The housemates must face the challenges brought to them by the returning ex-housemates. These challenges involved building and defending two towers of dominoes, handling and protecting a group of eggs, and competing in certain games.^{T12}	Passed	

- ^Note T1: With Patrick's sacrifice of standing straight on a cart for 12 hours, House B got 50% of their weekly budget.
- ^Note T2: Originally, all male housemates with the exception of Jason who will be wearing a flesh-colored bodysuit, will be dancing naked while all female housemates will wear a T-back bikini. However, due to some housemates' families' reaction about the task, House A housemates Tibo (in exchange for groceries for his family with the same amount as their weekly budget) and Johan decided to wear a flesh-colored bodysuit and T-back bikini, respectively, while all House B housemates decided to wear flesh-colored bodysuits. House A scored 185 points, down from their 350 base points after committing 18 mistakes. House B scored -1130 points, down from their 100 base points after committing 82 mistakes.
- ^Note T3: Upon her arrival at the Confession Room, Kätlin Laas chose Group B's artwork which signaled their win. Both artworks were actually half-finished.
- ^Note T4: Group B housemates, performing first, had a variety show which included Patria explaining the Philippine Flag, a series of dances including Paro-Parong Bukid danced by Rob and Yuri, Tinikling danced by Mariel and Tom, and the boys dancing Maglalatik, a role-playing on Filipino family and courtship and Tom and Kätlin singing Maalaala Mo Kaya. Group A housemates had a Wowowee type of show including dancing the Pandanggo sa Ilaw with Kätlin, dancing the Maglalatik, playing Filipino games, acting out certain Filipino television advertisements and soap operas, role-playing on Filipino courtship, dancing Singkil and Balagtasan (old Filipino form of a poetic debate) with Delio.
- ^Note T5: Only four challenges were held because Group A swept the first three challenges. The fourth challenge, deemed a special reward challenge, was also won by Group A. Thus, a fifth game was not necessary.
- ^Note T6: Neo-Group A's video, which had an anti-vice advocacy theme, earned 47,862 views against the 121,182 views of Neo-Group B's video, a midget skit entitled Pinoy Big Babies Toddlers Up.
- ^Note T7: Ram Ong, winner of TGIF’s bartending competition this year and the official representative of the Philippines to the Asia-Pacific region to the World Bartender Championship in 2010, and Ruel Santos, 2nd runner-up of TGIF's 14th Annual Shake Rattle and Pour, were the guest coaches who taught the housemates how to do flair bartending.
- ^Note T8: The housemates had to teach Annina all four tasks to get a budget the following week.
- ^Note T9: With Rica as the host, the concert sported a tiger motif with outfits designed by Sam. In sequence, the housemates performed a Pinoy Ako dance, the Punjabi tiger dance with Harish, a Patron Tequila dance performed by the girl housemates, a rock number performed by Cathy and Johan to the song You Belong With Me, a Hanggang Ngayon duet between Melisa and Jason, and a dance number played to the tune of the Survivor song Eye of the Tiger. The team made 14 mistakes.
- ^Note T10: The sipa task went underway on Day 93, but the housemates' initial excitement at winning the task was dashed as they reviewed the footage and saw that Kath did not count properly. The housemates decided to risk staying up longer hours to complete the task. The clock still had less than 500 minutes left at the time the task was finished.
- ^Note T11: The counting for yellow and green balls was correct but the count for blue balls was one short.
- ^Note T12: The domino tower remained intact despite being destroyed a few times. PHP 60,000 was deducted from the pot as three eggs were broken at PHP 20,000 each. The housemates lost twice in the games, costing PHP 45,000 each. A total of PHP 150,000 was deducted from the Big Four pot.

== Head of Household and Hand Grenade ==
As the two houses became one, on Day 68, Big Brother revealed to the housemates two new twists this season, the Head of Household and Hand Grenade twists. The Head of Household twist is similar to the twist of the second season of Pinoy Big Brother: Celebrity Edition. Each week, the housemates will undergo HOH competitions. The HOH for the week will get the following privileges for winning:

- Immunity from nominations
- Use of shower room at any time
- Being able to receive items from the outside world that they desire
- Sending a text message to anyone in the outside world

A housemate will be chosen each week to become a hand grenade user, where they will be forced to give the full three points for nominations face-to-face to another housemate, as a consequence of losing in the HOH competition. Beginning the third HOH game, the hand grenade holder is given the alternative to automatically nominate themselves for eviction instead of giving all three points to another housemate.

For their final HOH competition in Day 111, Big Brother revealed that the final Head of Household will also be the Hand Grenade user, where the HOH will give an automatic nomination to one housemate.

Task No.	Date given	Description	Head of Household	Hand Grenade User	Hand Grenade Recipient
1	December 10, 2009 (Day 68)	Wire Maze; A wire maze must be traversed using a metallic ring. Each housemate will only be given one try. Whenever the ring touches any part of the wire maze, the remaining housemates in the house will get electrocuted.	Paul Jake	Carol	Hermes
2	December 19, 2009 (Day 77)	Cup Stacking; The housemates will compete over a cup stacking game. The person who gets the fastest time to finish the routine will win the competition.	Rica	Cathy	Patrick
3	December 26, 2009 (Day 84)	Memory Game; The housemates will undergo two stages wherein they will have to memorize words or pictures flashed on the Confession Room monitor. The final stage involves writing words and the pictures in the correct order.	Cathy	Johan	Rica
4	January 2, 2010 (Day 91)	Tower of Dominoes; The housemates were to build a tower of dominoes. In round one, the housemates were divided into two teams, with each housemate's hands bound together. In round two, the housemates were blindfolded and had to build a tower of domines. The housemate with the highest tower from the winning group will be the HOH while the housemate with the shortest tower will be the Hand Grenade User.	Paul Jake	Jason	Self Automatic Nomination
5	January 10, 2010 (Day 99)	Mechanical Bull Riding; The housemates were to ride bulls in three different rounds. In round one, the housemates are to ride the bull with two hands. First four housemates with longest time will win. In round two, they are to ride the bull with two hands but the bull's speed gets faster to make it harder. First two housemates will then advance to round 3. In the final stage, the two remaining housemates cannot hold on to the bull.	Kath	Jason	Tibo
6	January 17, 2010 (Day 106)	Sliming The Truth; Each housemate was tasked to douse a housemate with slime based on the result of the survey they did last week. The housemate who correctly poured the slime on who they think that got the most votes from the survey gets a point and whoever had the most number of correct answer is the winner.	Mariel	Hermes	Self Automatic Nomination
7	January 22, 2010 (Day 111)	Selection; Each housemate will openly cast his or her vote as Head of Household. The Resbak Attack team will also decide on their pick. Big Brother also declared it as the last Head of Household competition	Tibo	Tibo	Jason (Automatic Nomination)

== Nomination history ==
The housemate first mentioned in each nomination gets two points, while the second gets one point. The percentage of votes shown is the percentage of votes to save unless other wise stated.

At least two housemates from each house will be up for eviction. This means that there are at least four housemates nominated every nomination night. However, the housemate with lowest number of votes, no matter which house s/he is in, would be eliminated. Group A housemates are housemates initially from House A while Group B housemates are housemates initially from House B, with the exception of Tom, originally part of House A, and Melisa, originally part of House B, who were swapped by Big Brother before the first nomination. The color for the names of the votes and nominees indicate the group to which they each belong at the time of nomination and subsequent salvation from eviction.

On Day 23, the housemates switched houses, with Group A living in House B and vice versa. On Day 24, Rob and Carol swapped Groups and Houses, and are now therefore part of Groups B and A respectively. The color for groups did not change however.

On Day 39, as a result of the 4th game in the 6th weekly task, Group A and Group B housemates swapped houses once again. The color for groups did not change however.

On Day 50, the females of each group switched Houses. Group A's males and Group B's females were to be called "Neo-Group A," while Group A's females and Group B's males were to be known as "Neo-Group B." Both of the new-groups were therefore given new colors below; the colors for the Houses stay the same.

On Day 57, Big Brother announced that all housemates are up for eviction, with the viewers voting to evict.

On Day 63, Big Brother announced that the remaining housemates would be living in House A. Carol, Hermes, Melisa, Rica and Yuri were told to stay in House B to await the announcement of the evictee the following day. On Day 64, the fourteen remaining housemates all stayed in House A.

From the eighth nomination night onwards, a new voting scheme was used, wherein the viewers are given the choice of voting to save or voting to evict a housemate. The percentage of evict votes will be added from the percentage of save votes, the voting difference being used as basis. The housemate who gets the lowest difference is evicted from the house. Also, with the housemates already living in one house, the housemates with the three highest points will be nominated for eviction.

On Day 68, Big Brother announced that there will be Head of Household (HOH) competitions each week. The HOH gets immunity from nominations in their respective week. The hand grenade user gets to give the full three points to one housemate face to face. For the eighth and ninth nomination night, this is done before the other housemates nominated. From the tenth nomination night onwards, this is done after the other housemates nominated. Starting from the tenth nomination night onwards, the hand grenade user can also opt to give himself an Automatic Nomination instead of giving the three points to another housemate.

On Day 105, eight ex-housemates returned to take part in a twist by Big Brother. These housemates remained as ex-housemates and were not re-instilled as regular housemates. Five of the eight ex-housemates were given their repeated eviction on Day 112. The remaining three ex-housemates stayed for one more week and were given their repeated eviction on Day 119. Their first eviction status was maintained, however.

On Day 120, the six remaining housemates had a different manner of nominations, giving one point to two housemates they feel should leave face-to-face. However, Big Brother announced that all six housemates, including Melisa who has a sure spot in the Big 5, are up for eviction this week.

Pinoy Big Brother: Double Up nomination history
	#1	#2	#3	#4	#5	Bagyong Walay	Bagyong Isa	#8	#9	#10	#11	#12	#13	#14	#15	BIG NIGHT	Nominations received
	#1	#2	#3	#4	#5	#6	#7	#8	#9	#10	#11	#12	#13	#14	#15	BIG NIGHT	Nominations received
Eviction Day and Date	Day 21 Oct. 24	Day 28 Oct. 31	Day 35 Nov. 7	Day 42 Nov. 14	Day 49 Nov. 21	Day 56 Nov. 28	Day 64 Dec. 6	Day 77 Dec. 19	Day 84 Dec. 26	Day 91 Jan. 2	Day 98 Jan. 9	Day 105 Jan. 16	Day 112 Jan. 23	Day 119 Jan. 30	Day 126 Feb. 6	Day 133 Feb. 13	Nominations received
Nomination Day and Date	Day 14; Oct. 17	Day 22; Oct. 25	Day 28; Oct. 31	Day 36; Nov. 8	Day 42; Nov. 14	Day 50; Nov. 22	Day 57; Nov. 29	Day 70; Dec. 12	Day 78; Dec. 20	Day 85; Dec. 27	Day 92; Jan. 3	Day 99; Jan. 10	Day 106; Jan. 17	Day 113; Jan. 24	Day 120; Jan. 31		Nominations received
Melisa	Paul Jake; Princess	Paul Jake; Rob	Paul Jake; Johan	Paul Jake; Tibo	Cathy; Paul Jake	Cathy; Johan	Sam; Kath	Patrick; Johan	Patrick; Johan	Johan; Sam	Johan; Sam	Tibo; Hermes	Johan; Tibo	Paul Jake; Johan	Tibo; Paul Jake	Winner	4 + 1 + 15
Paul Jake	Delio; Princess	Delio; Rob	Delio; Jason	Jason; Rica	Carol; Rica	Carol; Jason	Carol; Rica	Johan; Cathy	Cathy; Melisa	Rica; Sam	Johan; Cathy	Cathy; Johan	Johan; Kath	Melisa; Kath	Mariel; Johan	Runner-Up	19 + 21
Jason	Johan; Princess	Rica; Delio	Delio; Tibo	Tibo; Johan	Carol; Johan	Tibo; Carol	Patrick; Carol	Patrick; Hermes	Patrick; Kath	Hermes; Kath	Self nomination	Tibo	Tibo; Johan	Paul Jake; Kath	Tibo; Paul Jake	3rd Place	30 + 2 + 6 (+2)
Johan	Rica; Jason	Paul Jake; Tibo	Jason; Delio	Carol; Paul Jake	Carol; Paul Jake	Jason; Carol	Rica; Rocky	Hermes; Tibo	Tibo; Kath	Rica	Tibo; Melisa	Hermes; Paul Jake	Paul Jake; Jason	Melisa; Mariel	Tibo; Paul Jake	4th Place	13 + 3 + 25
Tibo	Jason; Rica	Rob; Rica	Delio; Melisa	Melisa; Rica	Jason; Carol	Carol; Jason	Rocky; Rica	Rica; Melisa	Kath; Patrick	Rica; Johan	Cathy; Sam	Melisa; Mariel	Jason; Kath	Jason	Jason; Paul Jake	5th Place	18 + 2 + 24
Mariel	Jimson; Yuri	Carol; Patrick	Patrick; Tom	Kath; Yuri	Yuri; Patria	Yuri; Kath	Rica; Rocky	Sam; Cathy	Cathy; Sam	Sam; Rica	Cathy; Sam	Melisa; Cathy	Kath; Melisa	Kath; Melisa	Tibo; Paul Jake	Evicted (Day 126)	20 + 1 + 15
Kath	Carol; Tom	Yuri; Patrick	Hermes; Patria	Yuri; Mariel	Rob; Hermes	Patrick; Mariel	Rica; Cathy	Sam; Johan	Patrick; Paul Jake	Tibo; Rica	Johan; Sam	Hermes; Cathy	Tibo; Paul Jake	Johan; Paul Jake	Evicted (Day 119)		11 + 2 + 22
Hermes	Tom; Yhel	Mariel; Yuri	Mariel; Rob	Tom; Patrick	Rob; Patria	Rob; Mariel	Johan; Jason	Jason; Carol	Mariel; Kath	Paul Jake; Johan	Mariel; Sam	Mariel; Paul Jake	Self nomination	Evicted (Day 112)			10 + 14 (+1)
Cathy	Rica; Princess	Delio; Tibo	Tibo; Jason	Not eligible	Carol; Jason	Carol; Jason	Tibo; Yuri	Carol; Sam	Patrick	Rica; Sam	Sam; Mariel	Melisa; Mariel	Evicted (Day 105)				10 + 2 + 17
Sam	Not in the House					~~Hermes~~; ~~Mariel~~	Rica; Melisa	Carol; Tibo	Kath; Paul Jake	Paul Jake; Kath	Kath; Tibo	Evicted (Day 98)					1 + 18
Rica	Jason; Johan	Tibo; Johan	Delio; Tibo	Tibo; Carol	Paul Jake; Cathy	Cathy; Jason	Kath; Johan	Patrick; Hermes	Mariel; Kath	Mariel; Kath	Evicted (Day 91)						13 + 7 + 15 (+1)
Patrick	Jimson; Yhel	Mariel; Yuri	Yuri; Mariel	Rob; Yuri	Rob; Mariel	Hermes; Rob	Jason; Mariel	Rica; Tibo	Cathy; Kath	Evicted (Day 84)							17 + 1 + 16
Carol	Jimson; Kath	Mariel; Kath	Jason; Delio	Paul Jake; Jason	Jason; Cathy	Paul Jake; Johan	Yuri; Tibo	Hermes	Evicted (Day 77)								10 + 20 + 2 + 5
Rocky	Not in the House					~~Yuri~~; ~~Hermes~~	Yuri; Johan	Voluntary Exit (Day 67)									3
Yuri	Jimson; Mariel	Tom; Mariel	Tom; Mariel	Tom; Mariel	Rob; Patria	Kath; Rob	Rica; Cathy	Evicted (Day 64)									17 + 3
Rob	Jason; Johan	Jason; Tibo	Tom; Kath	Tom; Patrick	Patria; Yuri	Patrick; Hermes	Evicted (Day 56)										4 + 19
Patria	Hermes; Tom	Patrick; Mariel	Patrick; Rob	Hermes; Yuri	Patrick; Rob	Evicted (Day 49)											9
Tom	Patria; Carol	Carol; Kath	Kath; Mariel	Rob; Mariel	Forced Eviction (Day 42)												19
Delio	Princess; Melisa	Rica; Johan	Johan; Jason	Evicted (Day 35)													19
Yhel	Jimson; Patria	Tom; Carol	Forced Eviction (Day 26)														2 (+1)
Princess	Cathy; Tibo	Delio; Tibo	Voluntary Exit (Day 22)														6 (+1)
Jimson	Carol; Patrick	Evicted (Day 21)															10
JM	Forced Eviction (Day 5)																0
Kenny	Forced Eviction (Day 5)																0
Toffi	Forced Eviction (Day 5)																0
JP	Voluntary Exit (Day 3)																0
Notes	See note 1	See note 2	See note 3	See note 4	See note 5	See note 6	See note 7	See note 8	See note 9	none	See note 10	See note 11	See note 12	See note 13	See note 14	See note 15	
Head of Household	No; HOH							Paul Jake	Rica	Cathy	Paul Jake	Kath	Mariel	Tibo	No; HOH		
Hand Grenade Users	No; Hand Grenade Users							Carol	Cathy	Johan	Jason	Jason	Hermes	Tibo	No; Hand Grenade Users		
Hand Grenade Recipients	No; Hand Grenade Recipients							Hermes	Patrick	Rica	None	Tibo	None	Jason	No; Hand Grenade Recipients		
Up for eviction	Jason; Princess; Carol; Jimson	Delio; Princess; Tibo; Carol; Mariel; Yhel	Delio; Jason; Mariel; Patrick; Tom	Carol; Jason; Paul Jake; Tibo; Tom; Yuri	Carol; Patria; Rob; Yuri	Carol; Jason; Rica; Patrick; Rob	Open Voting	Carol; Hermes; Patrick; Sam	Cathy; Kath; Patrick	Johan; Paul Jake; Rica; Sam	Jason; Johan; Sam	Cathy; Hermes; Mariel; Melisa; Tibo	Hermes; Johan; Kath; Tibo	Jason; Johan; Kath; Melisa; Paul Jake	Jason; Johan; Mariel; Paul Jake; Tibo	Open Voting	
Saved from eviction	Jason; 46.85% Carol; 24.16% Princess; 18.79%	Carol; Delio; Mariel; Tibo	Jason; 51.42% Tom; 22.78% Patrick; 14.23% Mariel; 6.14%	Carol; Jason; Paul Jake; Tibo; Yuri	Carol; 69.51% Rob; 11.74% Yuri; 11.35%	Rica; 38.55% Jason; 35.81% Carol; 15.11% Patrick; 6.21%	Results Mariel; 22.94% Carol; 17.25% Hermes; 9.80% Rocky; 7.01% Sam; 4.67% Patrick; 3.90% Rica; 1.60% Cathy; 1.58% Kath; 1.53% Melisa; 1.08% Tibo; 0.74% Jason; 0.60% Paul Jake; 0.46% Johan; 0.32%	Sam; 10.23% Patrick; 3.78% Hermes -9.96%	Kath; 6.13% Cathy; 4.96%	Sam; 15.17% Johan; 13.48% Paul Jake; 12.56%	Jason; 34.46% Johan; 10.19%	Melisa; 31.86% Tibo; 2.32% Mariel -3.55% Hermes -10.43%	Johan; 26.00% Kath; 6.69% Tibo; 1.90%	Melisa; 20.81% Jason; 18.59% Paul Jake; 17.90% Johan; 7.39%	Paul Jake; 28.64% Jason; 22.98% Melisa; 17.83% Johan; 14.97% Tibo; 12.25%	Melisa; 32.08%	
Evicted	Jimson; 10.20% to save	No; Eviction	Delio; 5.43% to save	No; Eviction	Patria; 7.40% to save	Rob; 4.32% to save	Yuri; 26.52% to evict	Carol -18.42%	Patrick; 1.41%	Rica; 10.37%	Sam; 8.64%	Cathy -13.54%	Hermes -6.84%	Kath -0.38%	Mariel; 3.34% to save	Paul Jake; 27.31% Jason; 24.97% Johan; 7.94% Tibo; 7.69%	
Forced Eviction	JM; Kenny; Toffi	Yhel	none	Tom	none											Paul Jake; 27.31% Jason; 24.97% Johan; 7.94% Tibo; 7.69%	
Voluntary Exit	JP	Princess	none						Rocky	none						Paul Jake; 27.31% Jason; 24.97% Johan; 7.94% Tibo; 7.69%	

Legend

Bold Italicized name Indicates that the housemate won the "Big Jump to the Big Night"; however was still included in the list of remaining housemates, who will face the public vote, which is for the Big Winner.
Blue names indicate nominees from Group A
Red names indicate nominees from Group B
Green names indicate nominees from Neo-Group A
Dark orange names indicate nominees from Neo-Group B

Automatic Nomination (due to violation(s) committed, as a reward for the winning house, as imposed by the Hand Grenade User)

^Note 1: JP voluntarily left the House on Day 3. He last stayed in House B before he exited. JM, Kenny and Toffi failed their task and had to leave on Day 5.
^Note 2: Princess, Mariel and Yhel were given an automatic nomination by Big Brother for talking about nominations with their fellow housemates. House B was given the opportunity to do a sacrifice to save one of the automatically nominated housemates, which they chose to be Mariel. Princess voluntarily left the House on Day 22. On Day 24, Rob and Carol were swapped to opposing groups. On Day 25, the voting for the Second Eviction Night was canceled due to Yhel's forced eviction, dubbed as the first forced eviction for the season.
^Note 3: There were three nominees from Group B as there was a tie for the highest points scored. Both Tom and Mariel scored 5 points while Patrick scored 4 points, making him the third nominee, with the second highest nomination points.
^Note 4: As Cathy was still en route from Finland to the Philippines, she was not able to nominate, although she could be nominated. Meanwhile, Tibo and Paul were each tied for the most nomination points with 5, while Jason and Carol were tied for the second most points with 3. On Day 39, voting was suspended due to Tom's exit from the house to be confined to the hospital. On Day 40, Tom was able to return, although voting remained suspended. On Day 41, it was announced that Tom has been forcibly evicted from the house. He left the next day accompanied by ex-housemate Princess.
^Note 5: As per stipulation for the weekly task, only the top nomination point earner from Group A and the top three point earners from Group B were nominated. Tom, who was physically at House B during the nominations did not participate as he was already regarded as evicted.
^Note 6: As per stipulation for the weekly task, only the top nomination point earner from Group B and the top two point earners from Group A were nominated. In addition to that, Group B automatically nominated Rica as part of their reward. As Rob and Patrick had the same highest number of nomination points, they were both nominated. As new housemates, Rocky and Sam were exempted from nominations. They were given the chance to nominate but their votes were not counted.
^Note 7: Neo-Group A housemates nominated Neo-Group B housemates and vice versa. One point was given to each nominees instead of the usual 1 and 2 points. Big Brother then revealed the top two nominees, regardless of ties, to the housemates of each house. They were given the chance to discuss whether they would change their nominees or not. The top two nominees for Neo-Group A were Johan and Yuri. However, after the discussion of Neo-Group B, Kath was placed as a nominee instead of Yuri. The top two nominees for Neo-Group B were Rica and Rocky; no change in nominees happened after Neo-Group A's discussion. However, Big Brother later on announced that all housemates are up for eviction. On Day 63, voting was officially closed and all saved housemates were asked to stay in House A with the exception of Carol, Hermes, Melisa, Rica and Yuri who were asked to stay in House B until the next day.
^Note 8: On Day 67, Rocky voluntarily exited the house.
^Note 9: As the designated three kings, Hermes, Johan and Patrick had to give 3 points for nomination to one housemate, 1 point from each of them.
^Note 10: As the hand grenade user, Jason opted to give himself an Automatic Nomination than to give the three points to another housemate.
^Note 11: After Cathy has been evicted, she was not welcomed to the outside world and proceeded to House B after being instructed by Big Brother.
^Note 12: As part of the Resbak Attack twist, seven ex-housemates re-entered the house to challenge the remaining housemates. Princess, Delio, Tom, Rob, Yuri, Patrick and Rica re-entered House B where Cathy was already staying. Hermes chose to give himself an Automatic Nomination than to give the three points to another housemate. As Tom left on Day 107, Kenny re-entered the house to be his replacement. On Eviction Night, Cathy was given her exit, along with Delio, Kenny, Patrick and Rob.
^Note 13: Princess, Rica and Yuri were told to enter the main house as houseplayers. They were to pretend to be regular housemates. Big Brother revealed that the last HOH of the season (Tibo) will also serve as the Hand Grenade User, where he will have the power of automatic nomination. On Eviction Night, houseplayers Princess, Rica and Yuri were given their exit. This will be the last time that the S.E. voting scheme will be used in the season, for the public will already vote for the Big Winner.
^Note 14: As Melisa won the endurance challenge, she won an automatic spot in the Big Five and will be exempted from the last eviction until the final. Big Brother announced that this round of nominations were void, and all housemates are nominated for open voting to save. With this, Melisa was still nominated and should Melisa be the housemate that would have the lowest number of votes, she would still be saved in the upcoming eviction as per stipulation of the "Big Jump" special challenge. The second lowest would be evicted instead.
^Note 15: In the final week, all housemates remaining in the House are automatically up for public vote. The housemate with the largest percentage of votes will be the winner. The rest of the housemates would leave the House one by one according to percentage order, with the least leaving first. On Day 129, the ranking of the Big 5 were revealed to the public, with Paul Jake taking the first rank, followed by Jason, Melisa, Johan and Tibo, respectively.

=== S–E voting system result ===
Below is the eviction voting result from the eighth to fourteenth eviction round. This voting system was stopped after the fourteenth eviction round.

Eviction No.	Nominated Housemate	Votes			Result
Eviction No.	Nominated Housemate	To-Save	To-Evict	Net	Result
8	Carol	14.36%	-32.78%	-18.42%	Evicted
8	Hermes	7.73%	-17.70%	-9.97%	Saved
8	Patrick	6.85%	-3.06%	3.79%	Saved
8	Sam	13.88%	-3.65%	10.23%	Saved
9	Cathy	34.61%	-29.65%	4.96%	Saved
9	Kath	10.37%	-4.23%	6.13%	Saved
9	Patrick	11.28%	-9.87%	1.41%	Evicted
10	Johan	21.22%	-7.74%	13.48%	Saved
10	Paul Jake	16.13%	-3.57%	12.56%	Saved
10	Rica	15.79%	-5.42%	10.37%	Evicted
10	Sam	22.65%	-7.48%	15.17%	Saved
11	Jason	38.11%	-3.66%	34.46%	Saved
11	Johan	20.48%	-10.29%	10.19%	Saved
11	Sam	18.05%	-9.41%	8.64%	Evicted
12	Cathy	10.40%	-23.94%	-13.54%	Evicted
12	Hermes	2.76%	-13.19%	-10.43%	Saved
12	Mariel	1.98%	-5.53%	-3.55%	Saved
12	Melisa	33.46%	-1.60%	31.86%	Saved
12	Tibo	4.74%	-2.43%	2.32%	Saved
13	Hermes	8.56%	-15.40%	-6.84%	Evicted
13	Johan	33.32%	-7.32%	26.00%	Saved
13	Kath	9.43%	-2.74%	6.69%	Saved
13	Tibo	12.56%	-10.67%	1.90%	Saved
14	Jason	22.56%	-3.97%	18.59%	Saved
14	Johan	10.87%	-3.48%	7.39%	Saved
14	Kath	3.43%	-3.81%	-0.38%	Evicted
14	Melisa	24.73%	-3.92%	20.81%	Saved
14	Paul Jake	20.57%	-2.67%	17.90%	Saved

=== Fake eviction voting history ===
While the fate of housemates inside the House continues to rely on public votes, the voting history table below shows how the housemates voted against each other due to the Char-Char Change twist. On Day 120, Big Brother announced that the voting were all voided, and viewers still had power to vote ending the twist

	#12	#13	#14	#15	Fake eviction points received
Eviction Day and Date	Day 105 Jan. 16	Day 112 Jan. 23	Day 119 Jan. 30	Day 120 Jan. 31	Fake eviction points received
Jason	Tibo	Tibo	Paul Jake	Fake Voting; Discontinued	2
Johan	Hermes	Hermes	Paul Jake	Fake Voting; Discontinued	2
Mariel	Melisa	Kath	Jason	Fake Voting; Discontinued	2
Melisa	Hermes	Tibo	Paul Jake	Fake Voting; Discontinued	2
Paul Jake	Cathy	Hermes	Johan	Fake Voting; Discontinued	4
Tibo	Melisa	Hermes	Jason	Fake Voting; Discontinued	4
Kath	Mariel	Hermes	Paul Jake	Evicted	1
Hermes	Mariel	Johan	Evicted		6
Cathy	Tibo	Evicted			1
Saved from Fake Eviction	Cathy; 1 pt.	Johan; 1 pt. Kath; 1 pt. Tibo; 2 pts.	Melisa; 0 pts. Kath; 0 pts. Jason; 2 pts. Johan; 1 pt.	Fake Voting; Discontinued	
House Fake Evictee(s)	Hermes; 2 pts. Mariel; 2 pts. Melisa; 2 pts. Tibo; 2 pts.	Hermes; 4 pts.	Paul Jake; 4 pts.	Fake Voting; Discontinued	
Real Evictee	Cathy	Hermes	Kath	Fake Voting; Discontinued	

Nominated Housemates
Head of Household

== Big Date on The Big Night ==
The finale of the season, dubbed Big Date on The Big Night, was held at the Ninoy Aquino Stadium in Manila. As the finale was held a day before Valentine's Day, the show was partly given a Valentine/prom night theme. References to the Chinese zodiac and anything Chinese also abounded as the show was also held on the eve of Chinese New Year.

Big Date on the Big Night logo.

The opening song which references the Big 5 were sung by Bugoy Drilon, Jay-R Siaboc, Mark Bautista, Rocksteddy's Teddy Corpuz, Yeng Constantino and Charice Pempengco. The 21 ex-housemates also performed dances done throughout the season, namely Drinking Boys, 'Di Makatulog (the Filipino version of Insomnia), the Indian tiger dance, and even Can't Take My Eyes Off You. Accompanying the housemates were Sheryn Regis, Harish Singh, and Charlie Green in each of the last three mentioned.

To drum up support for each of the finalists, color-coded cheerleaders and live satellite feeds from Cebu, General Santos, Cagayan de Oro, and Mindoro were also seen.

The finale also announced the coming of the third Teen Edition, Pinoy Big Brother: Teen Clash 2010, as well as the appearances of the cast of Rubi, the Jabawockeez, and Kim Chiu.

The season was won by Melisa, who amassed 1,226,675 votes or 32.08% of the entire vote since it began on Day 120. Leaving before her were Paul Jake (1,044,275 votes or 27.31%), Jason (954,961 votes or 24.97%), Johan (303,751 votes or 7.94%), and Tibo (294,262 votes or 7.69%), who left the House as the so-called 5th Big Placer.

This table shows the summary of votes as obtained by each of the Big 5 in the Big Night.

Event	Big 5	Votes		Result
Event	Big 5	Actual Votes	Percentage	Result
Big Night	Jason	954,961	24.97%	3rd Place
Big Night	Johan	303,751	7.94%	4th Place
Big Night	Melisa	1,226,695	32.08%	Winner
Big Night	Paul Jake	1,044,295	27.31%	Runner-Up
Big Night	Tibo	294,262	7.69%	5th Place
TOTAL VOTES		3,823,924 votes	99.99%	—N/a

== The Big Reunion ==
On February 14, 2010, a day after the Big Night, the ex-housemates - minus Princess, Tom and Rocky - returned to the Big Brother House one more time to reflect on the season. The evictees were interviewed by Bianca in House B while Toni and the Big Five gathered in House A. Mariel handled things from the Confession Room. Cathy and Hermes received a call from Big Brother Finland winner Aso and second-placer Katlin. Toni admitted to the Big Five that the interviews for the Big Swap were fake. They were greeted by Big Utol and visited by Vilma Santos, who advised them about the challenges of a showbiz career. Big Brother delivered his farewell address to the Housemates.

Preceded by Teen Edition Plus	Pinoy Big Brother Double Up (October 4, 2009–February 13, 2010)	Succeeded by Teen Clash 2010
