= Jason Francisco =

Filipino actor and comedian

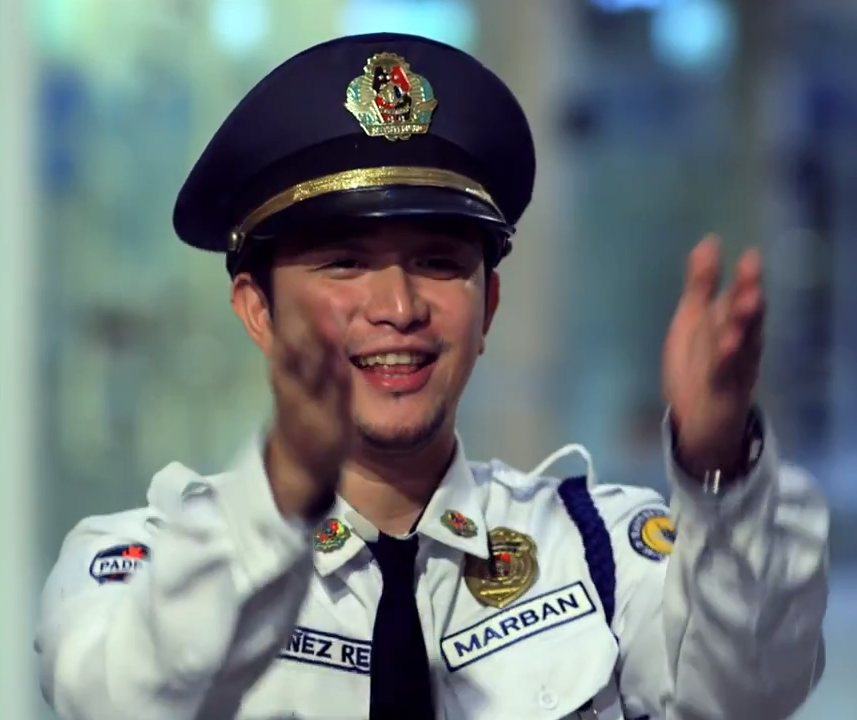
- Born: Jason Veron Francisco; October 11, 1987 (age 38); Calapan, Oriental Mindoro, Philippines
- Occupations: Actor; comedian; host
- Years active: 2009–2021
- Agents: Star Magic (2010–2017); PPL Entertainment (2017–2021)
- Spouse: Melisa Cantiveros (m. 2013)
- Children: 2

Jason Veron Francisco (born October 11, 1987) is a Filipino actor and comedian. He was a participant and 3rd placer in Pinoy Big Brother: Double Up. He was in the follow-up show, Melason In Love, with his girlfriend, Melisa Cantiveros, whom he later married.

== Early career ==
Francisco was one of the new batch of housemates introduced on Pinoy Big Brother: Double Up. He was able to garner enough votes wherein he ended the competition in 3rd Place. Francisco got a total of 954,961 votes or 24.97%. He won ₱300,000 and another ₱300,000 for his chosen charity.

== Current career ==
After the show ended, Francisco appeared on talk shows, including The Buzz, SNN: Showbiz News Ngayon, and Entertainment Live and the variety show, ASAP. He and his then-girlfriend and now-wife Melisa Cantiveros starred in a reality show entitled Melason In Love that premiered on February 22, 2010, and its sequel premiered on April 5, 2010.

After he left ABS-CBN, Francisco moved to GMA Network in August 2017 via Alyas Robin Hood and signs contract with PPL Entertainment.

== Filmography ==
=== Film ===
Year	Title	Role
2010	Petrang Kabayo	Cameo Role
2011	The Adventures of Pureza, Queen of the Riles	Ruben Padilla
2012	Larong Bata	Mr. Augosto Cacho
2012	24/7 in Love	Jay
2014	Shake, Rattle & Roll XV	Jake
2015	You're Still the One	Dong
2021	Momshies! Ang Soul Mo'y Akin!	Clark

=== Television ===
Year	Title	Role
2009–2010	Pinoy Big Brother: Double Up	Himself as a housemate (3rd Big Placer)
2010	Melason In Love	Himself
2010	Melason In Da City	Himself
2010	Melason Promdi Heart	Himself
2010–2012	Banana Split	Himself and Various characters
2010	The Bottomline with Boy Abunda	Himself as a Bottomliner
2010–2016	ASAP	Himself as a host/performer
2010	Precious Hearts Romances Presents: Impostor	Popoy Calantiao
2010	Kokey at Ako	Adonis
2010	3ow POwhz!	Himself
2010	Showtime	Himself as Guest Replacement Judge for Vice Ganda with Melai Cantiveros
2011	Precious Heart Romances: Mana Po	Milosebio "Milo" Kiping
2011	Wansapanataym: Bully-lit	Densyo
2011	Happy Yipee Yehey	Co-host
2011	Wansapanataym: Wan Tru Lav	Truman
2011	Angelito: Batang Ama	Mervin
2012	Angelito: Ang Bagong Yugto	Mervin
2012	Kris TV	Co-host/Himself
2013	Wansapanataym: Number One Father & Son	Pepot
2013	Wansapanataym: OMG (Oh My Genius)	Atong
2013–2014	Honesto	Omar Batungbakal
2014	Pure Love	Frank
2015	Give Love On Christmas: Exchange Gift	Alvin
2015	Forevermore	Orly Cranberry
2015	Pinoy Big Brother: 737	Houseguest with Melai Cantiveros
2015–2016	On the Wings of Love	Cullen
2016	FPJ's Ang Probinsyano	Arnold Cortes
2016	My Super D	Michael
2017	Alyas Robin Hood	Matias
2017	Sunday PinaSaya	Himself / Special guest (3 episodes)
2017	All Star Videoke	Himself/Player/All Star Laglagers (4 episodes)
2017	Tadhana: Love Rehab	Kokoy
2017	MARS	Special guest
2017	Tonight with Arnold Clavio	Special guest
2017	Poptalk	Special guest/Traveller
2017	Wish Ko Lang: Totoy	Totoy's friend
2017	Celebrity Bluff	Himself / Player
2018	The One That Got Away	Moi Padilla
2018	Dear Uge	Troy
2018	Day Off	Co-host
2018	Wish Ko Lang: Dream House	Bobby
2019	Dragon Lady	Jeff
2019	Tonight with Boy Abunda	Guest with Melai Cantiveros
2020	Magandang Buhay	Guest
2021	Owe My Love	Richard Purr
2021	Stories from the Heart: Love on Air	Rommel Montella

== Awards and nominations ==
Year	Organization	Nomination	Result
2010	ASAP POP Viewer's Choice Awards	Pop Fans Club (MELASON)	Won
