= Mana Po =

Philippine TV series

- Genre: Drama, Comedy, Romance
- Directed by: Katski Flores; Theodore C. Boborol
- Starring: Melai Cantiveros; Jason Francisco; Tom Rodriguez; Megan Young
- Country of origin: Philippines
- Original language: Filipino
- No. of episodes: 30

Production
- Running time: 30-45 minutes
- Production company: Star Creatives

Original release
- Network: ABS-CBN
- Release: February 21 – April 1, 2011

Mana Po (lit. 'Inheritance' stylized as mana ₱O) is a 2011 Philippine television drama romance series broadcast by ABS-CBN. The series is the fourteenth installment of Precious Hearts Romances Presents. Directed by Katski Flores and Theodore C. Boborol, it stars Melai Cantiveros, Jason Francisco, Tom Rodriguez and Megan Young. It aired on the network's Hapontastic line up and worldwide on TFC from February 21 to April 1, 2011, replacing Juanita Banana and was replaced by Frijolito.

== Synopsis ==
How far will you go to get back something you think is rightfully yours? What will you do when your family's riches are inherited by someone you don't even know?

Brandi Dela Paz has made it her mission to reclaim the inheritance that is supposed to be hers. She will have to make the heir Milosebio "Milo" Kiping fall in love with her.

Before her father Vino died, he decided to correct his mistakes by giving everything that he owns to the son of his best friend Jack, whom he betrayed from way back when he kept and claimed the winnings from a sweepstakes ticket. His family lived a luxurious life, enjoying a fortune that isn't rightfully theirs, thus he made sure he can give back to Jack what he stole when the time of his death arrives.

Unexpectedly, Brandi did not like her father's revelations and is determined to fight for her right to the money and the family's company.

Will she succeed in her tricky and deceitful plan? Will she hit the jackpot and reclaim the fortune? Or will she give it all up and instead choose Milo's heart as a consolation prize?

== Cast and characters ==
=== Main cast ===
- Melai Cantiveros as Brandi Dela Paz
- Jason Francisco as Milosebio Jesus "Milo" Kiping
- Tom Rodriguez as Johnny Santos
- Megan Young as Winnie

=== Supporting cast ===
- RR Enriquez as Weng
- Johan Santos as Red Kiping
- Buboy Garovillo as Jack Kiping
- Giselle Sanchez as Jennifer "Ginny" Kiping
- Toby Alejar as Atty. Henry Chivas Miller
- Gilleth Sandico as Annie Rossi
- Quintin Alianza as Yakki Kiping
- Alex Castro as Bob
- Beatriz Saw as Sugar
- Josef Elizalde as Mompo
- John Arcilla as Vino Dela Paz
- Rachel Lobangco as Shirley Dela Paz
- Led Sobrepeña III as Vavushka

=== Special participation ===
- Marion Dela Cruz as Young Vino
- Kiray Celis as Young Brandi
- Kitkat as Young Jennifer

== See also ==
- Precious Hearts Romances Presents
- List of ABS-CBN Studios original drama series
