= Your Face Sounds Familiar (Philippine TV series) season 1 =

Your Face Sounds Familiar
- Season 1
- Hosted by: Billy Crawford
- Judges: Gary Valenciano; Jed Madela; Sharon Cuneta
- Winner: Melai Cantiveros
- Runner-up: Nyoy Volante
- Finals venue: Newport Performing Arts Theater, Resorts World Manila, Pasay, Philippines
- No. of episodes: 25

Release
- Original network: ABS-CBN; The Filipino Channel (International broadcaster)
- Original release: March 14 – June 7, 2015

Season chronology
- Next → Season 2

The first season of Your Face Sounds Familiar was a singing and impersonation competition for celebrities and was based on the Spanish version of the same name. It aired on March 14, 2015 in ABS-CBN and ended on June 7, 2015. It was hosted by Billy Crawford; Jed Madela, Gary Valenciano, and Sharon Cuneta served as the show's judges.

After 13 weeks, Melai Cantiveros emerged as the winner after garnering 51.93% of the public's votes.

== Development ==
The Philippine version was first announced by ABS-CBN in its trade show for advertisers in Rockwell Tent, Makati. In this show, 8 celebrities compete in a sing and dance number while impersonating iconic singers. Each week, the "Iconizer" (called the "Randomizer" in other franchises) assigns the artists at the end of each Sunday episode of whom they have to impersonate for the following week. Each of the artists must face the iconizer at the end of each episode from last place to first place and press the iconizer to reveal the icon they have to impersonate in the following week, and after pressing, the icon is revealed, and a sample playback of the song they have to perform will be played upon revealing the icon.

The show replaced the time slot of the second season of The Voice of the Philippines which ended on March 1, 2015.

On March 9, 2015, Sharon Cuneta made a comeback in ABS-CBN; one of her first projects would be to sit as a judge in the show with Madela and Valenciano. In earlier announcements, Toni Gonzaga was reported as one of the judges; however, she was replaced by Cuneta. Every week, the performers are guided by Teacher Annie Quintos of The Company and Teacher Georcelle of the G-Force for vocals and choreography respectively.

On April 5, 2015, the show aired a duet special episode, as Holy Week programming on Black Saturday pre-empts all non-cable shows. However, the eight celebrity contestants were still scored individually.

On April 18–19, 2015, Gary Valenciano temporarily left the show to fulfill his commitment of performing in a series of concerts in Papua New Guinea, Spain and Qatar. He was substituted by Boy Abunda. The same instance happened on May 16–17, 2015, and he was substituted by Vice Ganda.

=== Prize ===
Every week the winner wins a cash prize of 100,000 pesos, half of which was given to his or her chosen charity. The grand prize is 2 million pesos.

== Host, Judges and Mentors ==
The host and judges of Your Face Sounds Familiar

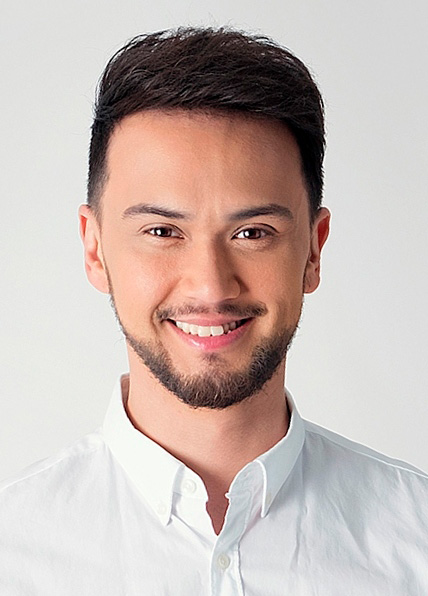
Billy Crawford

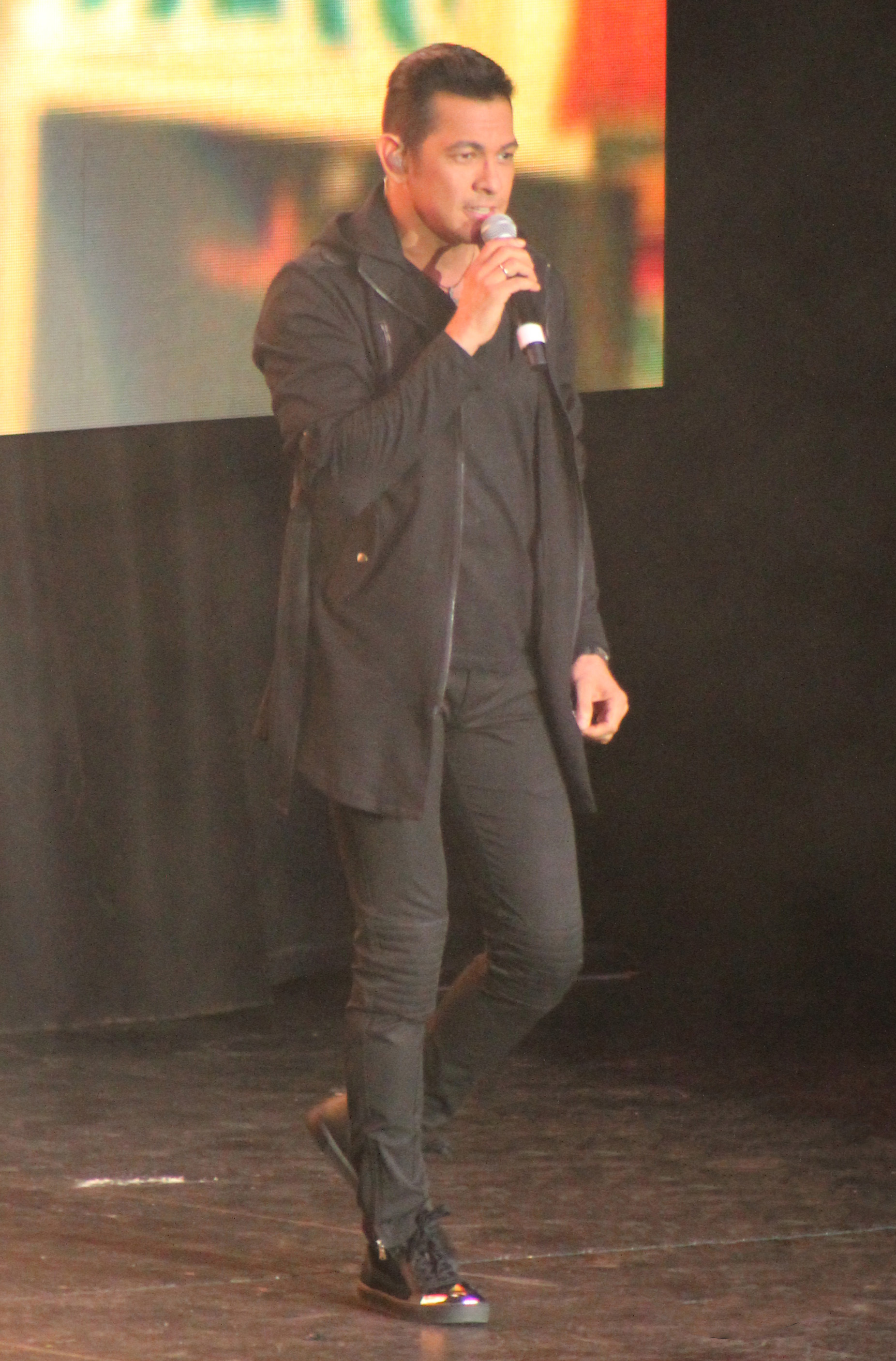
Gary Valenciano

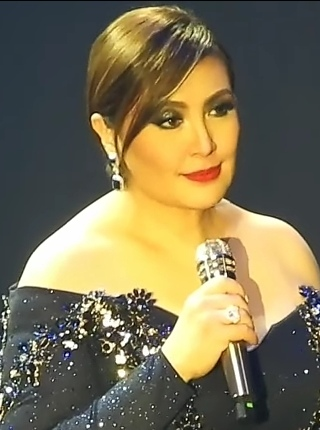
Sharon Cuneta

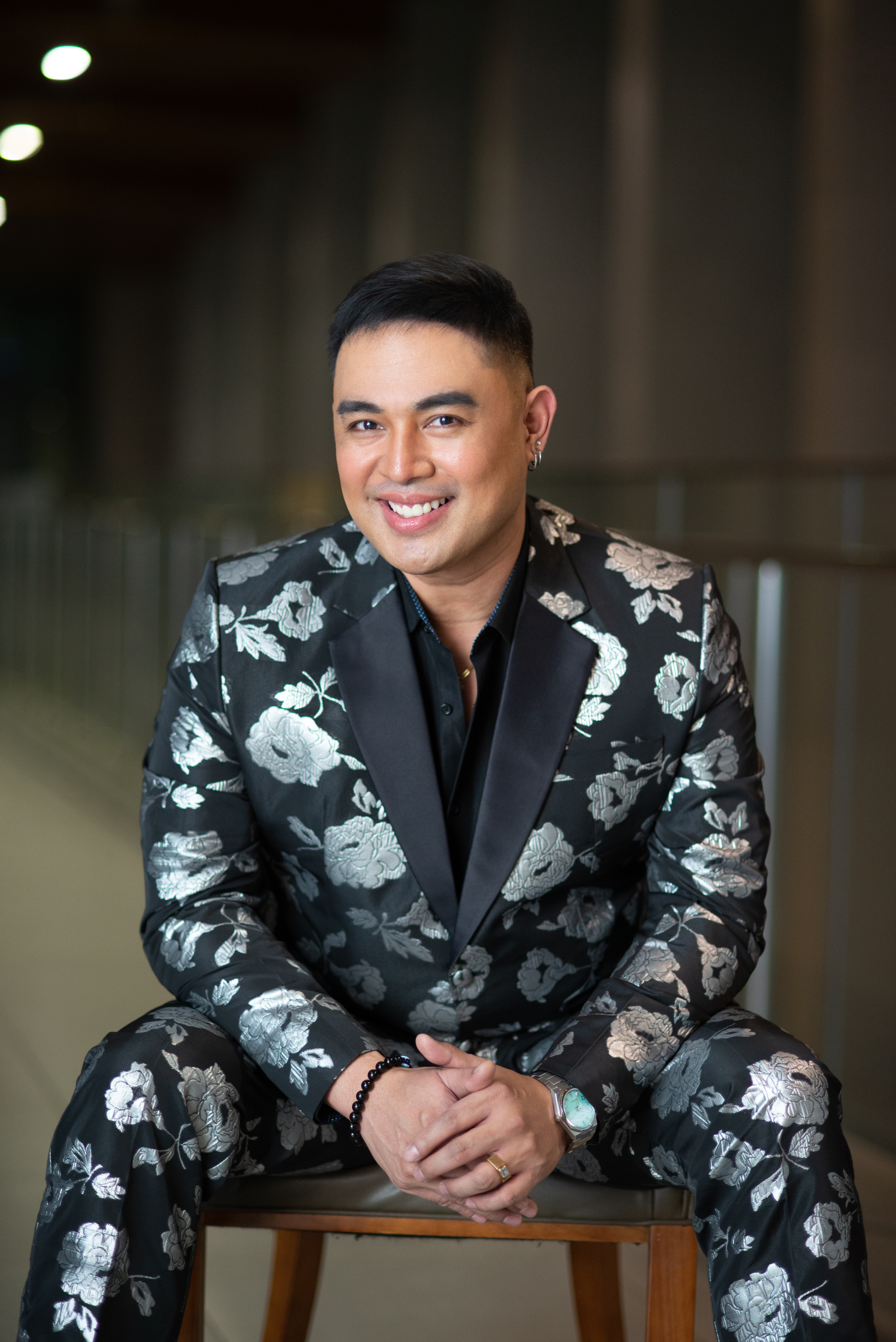
Jed Madela

=== Host ===
Billy Crawford serves as the host of the local version of Your Face Sounds Familiar.

=== Judges ===
The judges, dubbed as "The Jury" in the show:

The Jury

- Sharon Cuneta
- Gary Valenciano
- Jed Madela

Guest judges

- Boy Abunda (Valenciano's substitute judge for Week 6)
- Vice Ganda (Valenciano's substitute judge for Week 10)

=== Mentors ===
Annie Quintos of The Company served as the mentor for vocals while Georcelle Dapat of the G-Force served as the mentor for choreography and movement.

== Contestants ==
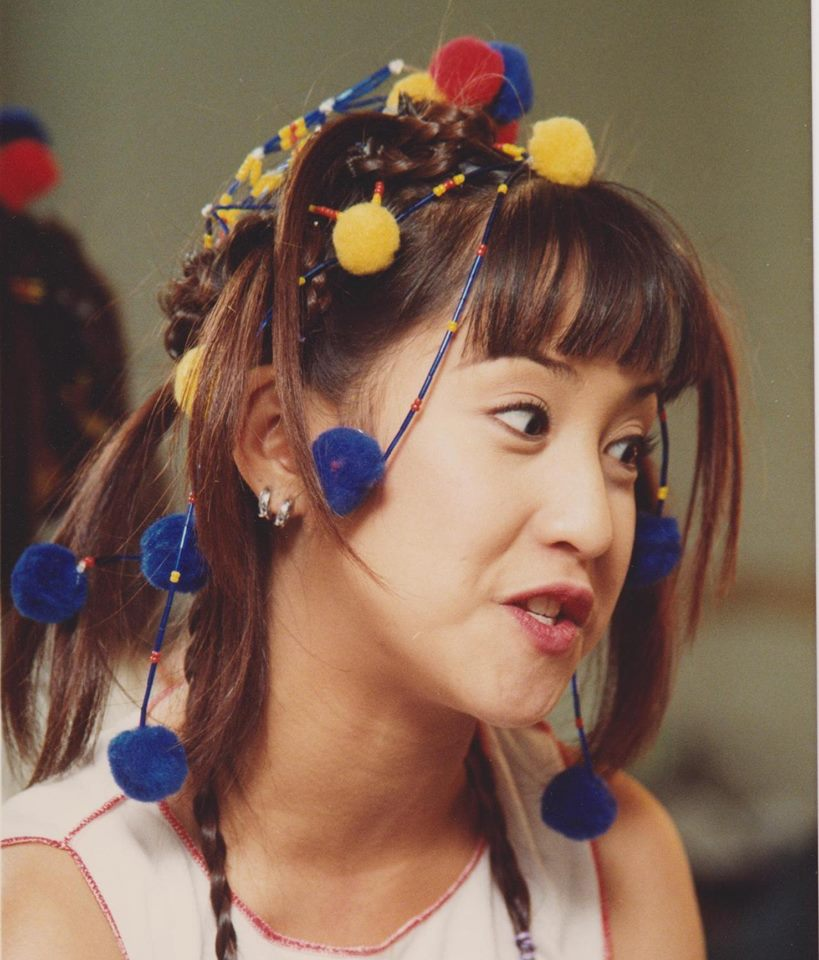
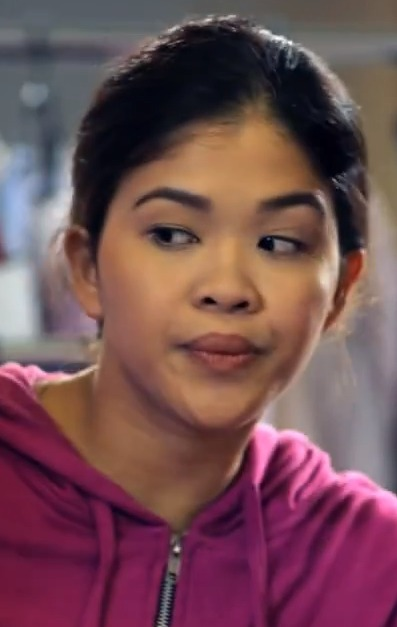
From left to right: Jolina Magdangal, Melai Cantiveros

The following are the participating performers in the show's season: They were revealed on March 5, 2015.

Celebrity performers of Your Face Sounds Familiar 1
Contestant	Notability	Result
Melai Cantiveros	Actress and comedian	Winner (1 win, 202 points)
Nyoy Volante	Singer-songwriter	Second Place (2 wins, 257 points)
Jay R	Singer-songwriter	Third Place (2 wins, 246 points)
Edgar Allan Guzman	Singer and actor	Fourth Place (1 win, 202 points)
Jolina Magdangal	Singer and actress	Did not qualify (2 wins, 187 points)
Karla Estrada	Singer and actress	Did not qualify (2 wins, 181 points)
Tutti Caringal	Band frontman	Did not qualify (1 win, 178 points)
Maxene Magalona	Actress	Did not qualify (1 win, 131 points)

== Results summary ==
The table below shows the corresponding total points earned per week: Each performance is ranked in two parts. In the first part, The Jury gives 1, 2, 3, 4, 5, 6, 7 and 8 points to the performers respectively. In the second part, all of the performers give 3 points to another contestant other than him or her.

Legend

- Winner
- Runner-up
- Third place
- Fourth place
- Top 4 contestants with the highest final total points
- Eliminated contestants with the lowest final total points
- Contestant won that particular week
- Contestant placed last that particular week

Contestant	Week 1	Week 2	Week 3	Week 4	Week 5	Week 6	Week 7	Week 8	Week 9	Week 10	Week 11	Week 12	Final Total Points	Finals
Melai	5th 12 points	5th 14 points	2nd 25 points	4th 18 points	2nd 24 points	8th 7 points	2nd 22 points	4th/5th 13 points	1st 42 points	7th/8th 6 points	6th/7th 7 points	5th/6th 12 points	3rd/4th 202 points	Winner; 51.93%
Nyoy	4th 17 points	2nd/3rd 21 points	4th 21 points	8th 4 points	1st 27 points	3rd 23 points	4th 19 points	2nd 25 points	2nd 19 points	2nd/3rd 23 points	3rd 25 points	1st 33 points	1st 257 points	2nd Place; 24.51%
Jay R	1st 36 points	2nd/3rd 21 points	5th 14 points	1st 33 points	3rd 18 points	6th 11 points	5th 12 points	4th/5th 13 points	3rd 18 points	2nd/3rd 23 points	2nd 26 points	3rd 21 points	2nd 246 points	3rd Place; 16.10%
Edgar Allan	2nd 23 points	8th 10 points	3rd 24 points	5th 13 points	5th 15 points	5th 12 points	3rd 21 points	3rd 21 points	4th 17 points	1st 27 points	6th/7th 7 points	5th/6th 12 points	3rd/4th 202 points	4th Place; 7.47%
Jolina	6th 9 points	6th 13 points	1st 26 points	2nd 21 points	4th 17 points	1st 28 points	8th 3 points	8th 10 points	5th 14 points	5th 19 points	4th 21 points	7th/8th 6 points	5th 187 points	Eliminated (Week 12)
Karla	3rd 20 points	1st 24 points	8th 3 points	7th 11 points	6th/7th 14 points	4th 15 points	7th 8 points	1st 28 points	6th 10 points	4th 21 points	8th 4 points	2nd 23 points	6th 181 points	Eliminated (Week 12)
Tutti	8th 7 points	4th 18 points	7th 9 points	3rd 20 points	6th/7th 14 points	2nd 27 points	6th 10 points	6th/7th 11 points	7th 9 points	6th 7 points	1st 27 points	4th 19 points	7th 178 points	Eliminated (Week 12)
Maxene	7th 8 points	7th 11 points	6th 10 points	6th 12 points	8th 3 points	7th 9 points	1st 37 points	6th/7th 11 points	8th 3 points	7th/8th 6 points	5th 15 points	7th/8th 6 points	8th 131 points	Eliminated (Week 12)

== Performances ==
The eight performances are divided into two nights – the first five contestants perform during Saturdays and the remaining three during Sundays.

Color key

- Contestant won that particular week
- Contestant placed last that particular week

=== Week 1 (March 14 & 15) ===
Non-competition performances

- Gary Valenciano as Bruno Mars – "Uptown Funk"
- Jed Madela as Elvis Presley – "Teddy Bear"
- Sharon Cuneta as Adele – "Someone Like You"

Episodes Hashtag

- #YourFaceSoundsFamiliar (Saturday)
- #KaFaceNaKaSoundPa (Sunday)

Order	Contestant	Performance	Total points	Rank
1	Karla Estrada	Sharon Cuneta – "Sana'y Wala Nang Wakas"	20	3rd
2	Nyoy Volante	Michael Jackson – "Thriller"	17	4th
3	Tutti Caringal	Freddie Aguilar – "Anak"	7	8th
4	Maxene Magalona	Taylor Swift – "Shake It Off"	8	7th
5	Jay R	Pepe Smith of Juan de la Cruz Band – "Beep Beep"	36	1st
6	Jolina Magdangal	Lady Gaga – "Bad Romance"	9	6th
7	Edgar Allan Guzman	Usher – "DJ Got Us Fallin' in Love"	23	2nd
8	Melai Cantiveros	Nora Aunor – "Pearly Shells"	12	5th

=== Week 2 (March 21 & 22) ===
Non-competition performance

- Billy Crawford as Boy George of Culture Club – "Karma Chameleon"

Episodes Hashtag

- #YFSFWeekendHabit (Saturday and Sunday)

Order	Contestant	Performance	Total points	Rank
1	Melai Cantiveros	Britney Spears – "...Baby One More Time"	14	5th
2	Jay R	Stevie Wonder – "I Just Called to Say I Love You"	21	2nd-3rd
3	Jolina Magdangal	Sampaguita – "Bonggahan"	13	6th
4	Maxene Magalona	Pilita Corrales – "Kapantay Ay Langit"	11	7th
5	Tutti Caringal	Adam Levine of Maroon 5 – "Moves like Jagger"	18	4th
6	Nyoy Volante	Yoyoy Villame – "Butse Kik"	21	2nd-3rd
7	Karla Estrada	Chaka Khan – "Through the Fire"	24	1st
8	Edgar Allan Guzman	Gary Valenciano – "Eto na Naman"	10	8th

=== Week 3 (March 28 & 29) ===
Episodes Hashtag

- #YFSFTransformation (Saturday and Sunday)

Order	Contestant	Performance	Total points	Rank
1	Nyoy Volante	Tina Turner – "Proud Mary"	21	4th
2	Tutti Caringal	April Boy Regino – "Di Ko Kayang Tanggapin"	9	7th
3	Jolina Magdangal	Cher – "Believe"	26	1st
4	Jay R	Bamboo Mañalac of Bamboo – "Noypi"	14	5th
5	Karla Estrada	Meghan Trainor – "All About That Bass"	3	8th
6	Melai Cantiveros	Blakdyak – "Modelong Charing"	25	2nd
7	Maxene Magalona	Ariana Grande – "Break Free"	10	6th
8	Edgar Allan Guzman	Daniel Padilla – "Nasa Iyo Na ang Lahat"	24	3rd

=== Week 4 (April 5) ===
Due to Holy Week pre-empting regular programming from Thursday to Saturday, the episode was solely a Sunday-only episode that featured duets instead of individual performances. However the contestants were still scored individually.

Episode Hashtag

- #YFSFDuets (Sunday)

Order	Contestant	Performance	Total points	Rank
1	Melai Cantiveros	Bendeatha and Mad Killah of Salbakuta – "S2pid Love"	18	4th
1	Tutti Caringal	Bendeatha and Mad Killah of Salbakuta – "S2pid Love"	20	3rd
2	Edgar Allan Guzman	John Travolta and Olivia Newton-John – "You're the One That I Want"	13	5th
2	Maxene Magalona	John Travolta and Olivia Newton-John – "You're the One That I Want"	12	6th
3	Jolina Magdangal	Juliet Sunot and Rey Abenoja of Aegis – "Sinta"	21	2nd
3	Nyoy Volante	Juliet Sunot and Rey Abenoja of Aegis – "Sinta"	4	8th
4	Karla Estrada	Dolly Parton and Kenny Rogers – "Islands in the Stream"	11	7th
4	Jay R	Dolly Parton and Kenny Rogers – "Islands in the Stream"	33	1st

=== Week 5 (April 11 & 12) ===
Episodes Hashtag

- #YFSFIcons (Saturday and Sunday)

Order	Contestant	Performance	Total points	Rank
1	Edgar Allan Guzman	Ricky Martin – "She Bangs"	15	5th
2	Maxene Magalona	Madonna – "Like a Virgin"	3	8th
3	Nyoy Volante	Justin Bieber – "Baby"	27	1st
4	Karla Estrada	Psy – "Gentleman"	14	6th/7th
5	Jay R	Alice Cooper – "I Never Cry"	18	3rd
6	Jolina Magdangal	Axl Rose of Guns N' Roses – "Sweet Child o' Mine"	17	4th
7	Tutti Caringal	Rico J. Puno – "Macho Gwapito"	14	6th/7th
8	Melai Cantiveros	Jolina Magdangal – "Chuva Choo Choo"	24	2nd

=== Week 6 (April 18 & 19) ===
Guest juror

- Boy Abunda (substitute for Gary Valenciano)

Episodes Hashtag

- #YFSFGoodVibes (Saturday and Sunday)

Order	Contestant	Performancw	Total points	Rank
1	Jay R	Tom Jones – "Sexbomb"	11	6th
2	Karla Estrada	Mariah Carey – "I'll Be There"	15	4th
3	Maxene Magalona	Vhong Navarro – "Totoy Bibo"	9	7th
4	Tutti Caringal	Steven Tyler of Aerosmith – "I Don't Want to Miss a Thing"	27	2nd
5	Nyoy Volante	apl.de.ap of Black Eyed Peas – "Bebot"	23	3rd
6	Melai Cantiveros	Cyndi Lauper – "Girls Just Want to Have Fun"	7	8th
7	Jolina Magdangal	Manny Pacquiao – "Para Sa'yo ang Laban Na 'To"	28	1st
8	Edgar Allan Guzman	Toni Gonzaga – "Catch Me, I'm Falling"	12	5th

=== Week 7 (April 25 & 26) ===
Episodes Hashtag

- #YFSFShine (Saturday and Sunday)

Order	Contestant	Performance	Total points	Rank
1	Nyoy Volante	Sylvia La Torre – "Sa Kabukiran"	19	4th
2	Edgar Allan Guzman	Ed Sheeran – "Thinking Out Loud"	21	3rd
3	Jolina Magdangal	Jaya – "Dahil Tanging Ikaw"	3	8th
4	Maxene Magalona	Francis Magalona – "Mga Kababayan Ko"	37	1st
5	Karla Estrada	Dulce – "Paano"	8	7th
6	Jay R	Beyoncé – "Single Ladies"	12	5th
7	Tutti Caringal	Lou Bega – "Mambo No. 5"	10	6th
8	Melai Cantiveros	Rihanna – "Umbrella"	22	2nd

=== Week 8 (May 2 & 3) ===
Episodes Hashtag

- #YFSFLevelUp (Saturday and Sunday)

Order	Contestant	Performance	Total points	Rank
1	Jolina Magdangal	Shakira – "Whenever, Wherever"	10	8th
2	Tutti Caringal	Yeng Constantino – "Chinito"	11	6th/7th
3	Edgar Allan Guzman	Andrew E. – "Humanap Ka ng Panget"	21	3rd
4	Jay R	Vic Sotto of VST & Co. – "Ipagpatawad Mo"	13	4th/5th
5	Maxene Magalona	Missy Elliott – "Work It"	11	6th/7th
6	Melai Cantiveros	Jay Contreras of Kamikazee – "Narda"	13	4th/5th
7	Karla Estrada	Ann Wilson of Heart – "Alone"	28	1st
8	Nyoy Volante	Freddie Mercury of Queen – "Bohemian Rhapsody"	25	2nd

=== Week 9 (May 9 & 10) ===
Episodes Hashtag

- #YFSFFiesta (Saturday)
- #YFSFPerforMOMs (Sunday)

Order	Contestant	Performance	Total points	Rank
1	Jay R	Justin Timberlake – "SexyBack"	18	3rd
2	Edgar Allan Guzman	Victor Wood – "Carmelita"	17	4th
3	Tutti Caringal	Jon Bon Jovi of Bon Jovi – "Bed of Roses"	9	7th
4	Maxene Magalona	Selena Gomez of Selena Gomez & the Scene – "Love You Like a Love Song"	3	8th
5	Nyoy Volante	Mike Hanopol of Juan de la Cruz Band – "Laki sa Layaw"	19	2nd
6	Jolina Magdangal	Prince of Prince and The Revolution – "Kiss"	14	5th
7	Karla Estrada	Manilyn Reynes – "Sayang na Sayang"	10	6th
8	Melai Cantiveros	Elizabeth Ramsey – "Waray Waray"	42	1st

=== Week 10 (May 16 & 17) ===
Guest juror

- Vice Ganda (substitute for Gary Valenciano)

Episodes Hashtag

- #YFSFUnkabogable (Saturday and Sunday)

Order	Contestant	Performance	Total points	Rank
1	Jay R	Billy Crawford – "Bright Lights"	23	2nd/3rd
2	Jolina Magdangal	Celine Dion – "Because You Loved Me"	19	5th
3	Maxene Magalona	Vanilla Ice – "Ice Ice Baby"	6	7th/8th
4	Karla Estrada	Angela Bofill – "This Time I'll Be Sweeter"	21	4th
5	Nyoy Volante	Katy Perry – "Firework"	23	2nd/3rd
6	Melai Cantiveros	Shirley Bassey – "Big Spender"	6	7th/8th
7	Tutti Caringal	Arnel Pineda of Journey – "Faithfully"	7	6th
8	Edgar Allan Guzman	Vice Ganda – "Karakaraka"	27	1st

=== Week 11 (May 23 & 24) ===
Episodes Hashtag

- #YFSFPasiklaban (Saturday and Sunday)

Order	Contestant	Performance	Total points	Rank
1	Edgar Allan Guzman	MC Hammer – "U Can't Touch This"	7	6th/7th
2	Maxene Magalona	Paris Hilton – "Stars Are Blind"	15	5th
3	Tutti Caringal	Ely Buendia of Eraserheads – "Ang Huling El Bimbo"	27	1st
4	Jolina Magdangal	Diana Ross – "When You Tell Me That You Love Me"	21	4th
5	Jay R	Alanis Morissette – "You Oughta Know"	26	2nd
6	Karla Estrada	Bonnie Tyler – "Total Eclipse of the Heart"	4	8th
7	Melai Cantiveros	Fred Panopio – "Pitong Gatang"	7	6th/7th
8	Nyoy Volante	Rod Stewart – "Da Ya Think I'm Sexy?"	25	3rd

=== Week 12 (May 30 & 31) ===
Episode Hashtags

- #YFSFFinal4 (Saturday and Sunday)

Order	Contestant	Performance	Total points	Rank
1	Jay R	Enrique Iglesias – "Hero"	21	3rd
2	Tutti Caringal	Mick Jagger of The Rolling Stones – "(I Can't Get No) Satisfaction"	19	4th
3	Jolina Magdangal	Michael Jackson – "Ben"	6	7th/8th
4	Maxene Magalona	Iggy Azalea – "Fancy"	6	7th/8th
5	Nyoy Volante	Luciano Pavarotti – "La donna è mobile"	33	1st
6	Melai Cantiveros	Grace Jones – "Do or Die"	12	5th/6th
7	Edgar Allan Guzman	John Legend – "All of Me"	12	5th/6th
8	Karla Estrada	Aretha Franklin – "(You Make Me Feel Like) A Natural Woman"	23	2nd

=== Finals: Week 13 (June 6 & 7) ===
The Grand Showdown was held in Resorts World Manila on June 6 and 7. Unlike in previous weeks where each of the contestants were assigned an icon by the iconizer, the finalists selected the icon that they impersonate in the finals, in addition, the eliminated contestants impersonated the icons they presumably would've impersonated for the finals.

During the second night, Liza Soberano and Enrique Gil appeared on the show to promote their then-upcoming film "Just the Way You Are" which was released on June 17, 2015.

The winner was decided via public vote. The finals were aired at a later timeslot due to the premiere of the second season of The Voice Kids, which coincidentally premiered on the same week, pre-empting Mga Kwento ni Marc Logan and Wansapanataym.

Non-competition performances
June 6

- Billy Crawford and Sharon Cuneta – "I Want You To Know" by Zedd featuring Selena Gomez
- Jed Madela and Gary Valenciano – "Good Time" by Owl City and Carly Rae Jepsen

June 7

- Liza Soberano and Enrique Gil – "Kiss You" by One Direction
- Jolina Magdangal as Karen Carpenter of The Carpenters – "I Won't Last a Day Without You"
- Maxene Magalona as Nicki Minaj – "Super Bass"
- Tutti Caringal as Bryan Adams – "Heaven"
- Karla Estrada as Gloria Gaynor – "I Will Survive"

Episodes Hashtag

- #YFSFGrandShowdown (Saturday)
- #YFSFGrandWinner (Sunday)

Order	Contestant	Performance	Vote percentage	Rank
1	Jay R	Frank Sinatra – "New York, New York"	16.10%	Third place
2	Edgar Allan Guzman	Chris Brown – "Turn Up The Music"	7.47%	Fourth Place
3	Melai Cantiveros	Miley Cyrus – "Wrecking Ball"	51.93%	Winner
4	Nyoy Volante	Whitney Houston – "I Will Always Love You"	24.51%	Second place

Special Awards

- Jolina Magdangal - "Mini Me" Award
- Karla Estrada - "Ultimate Diva" Award
- Maxene Magalona - "Yehey" Award
- Tutti Caringal - "Intensity 8" Award

== Television ratings ==
Television ratings for Your Face Sounds Familiar on ABS-CBN were gathered from two major sources, namely from AGB Nielsen and Kantar Media. AGB Nielsen's survey ratings were gathered from Mega Manila households, while Kantar Media's survey ratings were gathered from urban and rural households all over the Philippines.

Episode		Original airdate	Timeslot (PST)	AGB Nielsen			Kantar Media			Source
Episode		Original airdate	Timeslot (PST)	Rating	Timeslot	Primetime	Rating	Timeslot	Primetime	Source
1	"Season premiere"	March 14, 2015	Saturday 8:30 p.m.	18.2%	#2	#4	22.5%	#1	#3	
2	"Week 1 Performance – part 2"	March 15, 2015	Sunday 8:30 p.m.	16.8%	#2	#4	27.9%	#1	#1	
3	"Week 2 Performance – part 1"	March 21, 2015	Saturday 8:30 p.m.	20.0%	#2	#3	27.8%	#1	#2	
4	"Week 2 Performance – part 2"	March 22, 2015	Sunday 8:30 p.m.	20.8%	#2	#4	27.0%	#1	#2	
5	"Week 3 Performance – part 1"	March 28, 2015	Saturday 8:30 p.m.	22.4%	#1	#2	29.1%	#1	#2	
6	"Week 3 Performance – part 2"	March 29, 2015	Sunday 8:30 p.m.	23.1%	#2	#2	29.8%	#1	#1	
7	"Week 4 Performance"	April 5, 2015	Sunday 8:30 p.m.	20.4%	#3	#3	28.7%	#1	#1	
8	"Week 5 Performance – part 1"	April 11, 2015	Saturday 8:30 p.m.	21.4%	#2	#3	28.9%	#2	#3	
9	"Week 5 Performance – part 2"	April 12, 2015	Sunday 8:30 p.m.	19.0%	#3	#3	24.7%	#2	#3	
10	"Week 6 Performance – part 1"	April 18, 2015	Saturday 8:30 p.m.	21.4%	#1	#2	27.4%	#1	#1	
11	"Week 6 Performance – part 2"	April 19, 2015	Sunday 8:30 p.m.	22.0%	#2	#2	29.0%	#1	#1	
12	"Week 7 Performance – part 1"	April 25, 2015	Saturday 8:30 p.m.	23.9%	#1	#2	30.5%	#2	#1	
13	"Week 7 Performance – part 2"	April 26, 2015	Sunday 8:30 p.m.	22.2%	#2	#2	29.2%	#1	#1	
14	"Week 8 Performance – part 1"	May 2, 2015	Saturday 8:30 p.m.	20.8%	#1	#3	29.4%	#1	#2	
15	"Week 8 Performance – part 2"	May 3, 2015	Sunday 8:30 p.m.	22.1%	#2	#2	29.1%	#1	#1	
16	"Week 9 Performance – part 1"	May 9, 2015	Saturday 8:30 p.m.	22.4%	#1	#1	31.9%	#1	#2	
17	"Week 9 Performance – part 2"	May 10, 2015	Sunday 8:30 p.m.	23.1%	#1	#2	30.7%	#1	#1	
18	"Week 10 Performance – part 1"	May 16, 2015	Saturday 8:30 p.m.	23.7%	#1	#1	31.3%	#1	#1	
19	"Week 10 Performance – part 2"	May 17, 2015	Sunday 8:30 p.m.	23.4%	#2	#2	30.0%	#1	#1	
20	"Week 11 Performance – part 1"	May 23, 2015	Saturday 8:30 p.m.	21.7%	#1	#2	30.9%	#1	#2	
21	"Week 11 Performance – part 2"	May 24, 2015	Sunday 8:30 p.m.	20.9%	#2	#2	29.6%	#1	#1	
22	"Week 12 Performance – part 1"	May 30, 2015	Saturday 8:30 p.m.	21.6%	#1	#1	31.9%	#1	#1	
23	"Week 12 Performance – part 2"	May 31, 2015	Sunday 8:30 p.m.	22.8%	#2	#2	31.1%	#1	#1	
24	"Finale: The Grand Showdown – part 1"	June 6, 2015	Saturday 8:30 p.m.	26.4%	#1	#1	37.6%	#2	#2	
25	"Finale: Results Night – part 2"	June 7, 2015	Sunday 8:30 p.m.	26.7%	#1	#1	36.7%	#1	#1	
Season average				22.04%	#1.64	#2.24	29.71%	#1.16	#1.52	
