= Karla Estrada =

Filipino actress (born 1974)

- Born: Carla Elago Ford; November 21, 1974 (age 51); Tacloban, Philippines
- Education: Philippine Christian University (BS)
- Occupations: Actress; singer; host; comedian
- Years active: 1987–2022; 2023–present
- Political party: Tingog Sinirangan
- Children: 4 (incl. Daniel Padilla)
- Relatives: Antonio Aquitania (cousin)

Carla Elago Ford (born November 21, 1974), known professionally as Karla Estrada (Tagalog: [ˈkaɾlɐ ɛsˈtɾada]), is a Filipino-American actress, singer, television host, and comedian. She is best known for hosting the talk shows Magandang Buhay and Face 2 Face for ABS-CBN and TV5, respectively, as well as the variety show Chibugan Na! for RPN. She is also known as the mother of actor-singer Daniel Padilla.

In 2016, Estrada signed a 2-year exclusive contract with ABS-CBN.

== Early life and career ==
Karla Estrada was born Carla Elago Ford on November 21, 1974, in Tacloban City, Leyte, to a Filipino mother and an American father. Shortly thereafter, her father left after being misinformed that she had died at birth. Her younger cousin is actor Antonio Aquitania.

According to an episode in Maalaala Mo Kaya featuring accounts on her life, Estrada was born to a rich family but was forced to move to Tacloban after the death of her grandfather, who was responsible for most of the livelihood of the family. Estrada aspired to become an actress since childhood and joined singing competitions. She was discovered by a talent manager in Quezon City, which led to her appearance in That's Entertainment.

== Personal life ==
Estrada is the mother of Daniel Padilla whom she had at the age of 20 with Rommel Padilla. Estrada brought Daniel to see Rommel Padilla during his prison sentence three years later. She has three more children: Jose Carlito "JC", whom she had at the age of 21 with Naldy Padilla; Margaret Fiona "Magui" Ford, whose father is former Quezon City councilor and erstwhile Philippine Postal Corporation Chairman Mike Planas, who was already separated from Pat-P Daza; and Carmella "Lella" Ford, with a non-showbiz father. She has one grandson, Claudio, by her second son, JC.

At age 18, Estrada searched for her father who later apologized for not knowing she had survived infancy. In 2016, she stated she is on good terms with her father, describing herself as his "carbon copy".

In 2019, Estrada confirmed on Magandang Buhay she dated her non-showbiz boyfriend Jam Ignacio since June that year after her breakup with Mark Yatco, who was her partner since 2017. In August 2024, however, Estrada parted ways with Ignacio who has a new girlfriend, influencer and resident disc jockey base, Jellie AW.

== Filmography ==
=== Film ===
- Wanted Bata-Batuta (1987)
- First Time... Like a Virgin! (1992)
- Maricris Sioson: Japayuki (1993)
- Kahit May Mahal Ka Nang iba (1993)
- Teenage Mama (1993)
- Sobra Talaga (1994)
- Bala at Lipistik (1994)
- The Secrets of Sarah Jane: Sana'y Mapatawad Mo (1994)
- Kakaibang Karisma (1995)
- Masarap ang Unang Kagat (1998)
- Banatan (1999)
- Sa Iyo ang Sarap, Akin ang Hirap (1999)
- Markova: Comfort Gay (2000) – Markova's talent for Japan
- Kung Ikaw Ay Isang Panaginip (2002) – Bebang/Bisaya
- Super Noypi (2006) – Thelma
- Bahay Kubo: A Pinoy Mano Po! (2007) – Loida
- Loving You (2008) – Lina
- Pipo (2009)
- Pagnanasa (2010)
- This Guy's in Love with U Mare! (2012) – Mike's mom
- Palad Ta ang Nagbuot (Our Fate Decides) (2013)
- Sa Ngalan ng Ama, Ina, at mga Anak (2014) – Erning's wife
- Moron 5.2: The Transformation (2014) – Doctor 1
- Beauty and the Bestie (2015) – Barbara "Ms. Barney" Clooney
- Gandarrapiddo: The Revenger Squad (2017) – Peppa/Barna
- Familia Blondina (2019)
- Momshies! Ang Soul Mo'y Akin! (2021)
- Maid in Malacañang (2022)

=== Television ===
Year	Title	Role	Notes
1987–1996	That's Entertainment	Herself/Wednesday group member	
1994–1996	Chibugan Na!	Host	
1999	Isang Dalaga sa Panahon ng Trahedya	Malou	Television film
1999–2001	Saan Ka Man Naroroon	Lilay	
2001	Sa Dulo ng Walang Hanggan	Sening	
2005	Saang Sulok ng Langit	Liana	
2006	Love to Love: Love for Rent	Lucy	
2007–2008	Daisy Siete: Ulingling	Nessa	
2007	Your Song: Break It To Me Gently		Episode guest
2008	Sine Novela: Magdusa Ka	Metring	
2008	Obra: Boksingera		Episode guest
2009	Sine Novela: Kung Aagawin Mo ang Lahat sa Akin	Remy Del Monte/Brenda Aguirre	
2010	Maalaala Mo Kaya: Xylophone		Episode guest
2010	Sine Novela: Ina, Kasusuklaman Ba Kita?	Cora Evangelista	
2011	Alakdana	Madam Greta	
2011–2012	Ikaw Lang ang Mamahalin	Loida	
2012	Wansapanataym: Maan Antukin	Yaya	
2013	Kailangan Ko'y Ikaw	Apple Puno	
2013	The Voice of the Philippines	Herself/Auditionee	
2013–2014	Jim Fernandez's Galema: Anak ni Zuma	Bettina Barredo	
2015	Your Face Sounds Familiar 1	Herself/Contestant	
2015	Your Face Sounds Familiar 2	Herself/Guest Judge	
2015, 2016	Home Sweetie Home	Tita Marichris Matahimik	
2015	Pinoy Big Brother: 737	2nd Celebrity Houseguest	
2016	It's Showtime	Quarter 1-4 Judge Tawag ng Tanghalan	
2016–2022	Magandang Buhay	Host	
2016–2022	Funny Ka, Pare Ko	Carlita Delyon	
2023–2024	Face 2 Face	Herself/Host	
2025	Rainbow Rumble	Herself/Contestant	
2025	Pinoy Big Brother: Celebrity Collab Edition 2.0	Herself/Houseguest	
2026	Your Face Sounds Familiar 4	Herself/Guest Judge	Round 9 Guest Performer as Lady Gaga

=== Radio ===
Year	Title	Role
2023–2024	Ang Tinig Nyo	Host
