= Melai Cantiveros =

Filipino actress, comedian and host (born 1988)

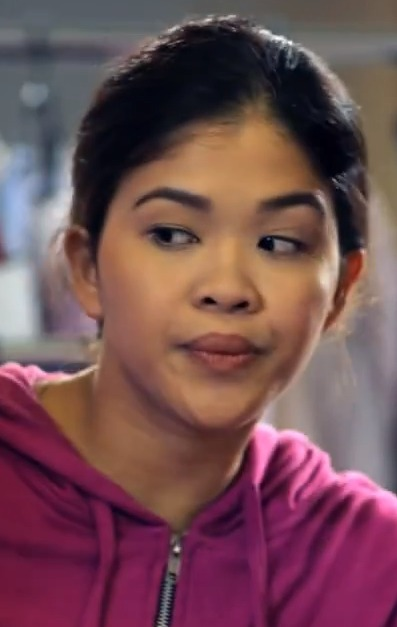
- Cantiveros in 2014
- Born: Melisa Bunayog Cantiveros; April 6, 1988 (age 38); General Santos, Philippines
- Occupations: Actress; comedian; host
- Years active: 2009–present
- Agent: Star Magic (2010–present)
- Spouse: Jason Francisco (m. 2013)
- Children: 2

Melisa "Melai" Bunayog Cantiveros-Francisco (Note: In this Philippine name for married women, the birth middle name or maternal family name is Bunayog, the birth surname or paternal family name is Cantiveros, and the marital name is Francisco.) (Tagalog: [ˈmɛlaɪ kantɪˈvɛɾɔs]; born April 6, 1988) is a Filipino comedian, television personality and actress. She rose to fame in 2009, after winning Pinoy Big Brother: Double Up. In 2015, she won the first season of the Filipino version of Your Face Sounds Familiar. She is currently one of ABS-CBN's contract talents and one of the host of the networks longest running morning show, Magandang Buhay. Her accolades include an Asia Artist Award, two PMPC Star Awards for Television, including a nomination for an Asian Television Award.

== Personal life ==
Melisa Bunayog Cantiveros was born on April 6, 1988 in General Santos, Philippines, to Dionisio and Virginia Cantiveros. She is the third of four siblings, and the only daughter in her family. She finished at Mindanao State University–General Santos, where she was an activist and member of a social democratic party.

She married her Pinoy Big Brother: Double Up housemate Jason Francisco on December 9, 2013, as she carried their first child, a girl born in 2014. On July 26, 2016, she and Francisco confirmed their separation through their daughter's Instagram. The couple later reconciled, with Cantiveros having her second child with Francisco, a girl born in 2017. The couple now have the YouTube channel "Melason Family".

== Career ==
In October 2009, Cantiveros entered the Big Brother house along with 25 other housemates. After 133 days, she was able to garner enough votes to reach the final episode wherein she won the competition by getting 1,226,675 votes or 32.08% of the entire votes.

In February 2010, Cantiveros did guesting in several talk shows like The Buzz, SNN: Showbiz News Ngayon, and Entertainment Live. She was also invited to variety shows such as ASAP ROCKS. She and her real life partner, Jason Francisco, starred in a reality show spin off entitled Melason In Love.

Cantiveros was also cast in the daytime drama Impostor. She also landed a main role in the fantaserye show, Kokey @ Ako. She also played a main role in Maalaala Mo Kaya as a maid named Pangga. She became one of the hosts on the now defunct noon time show Happy, Yipee, Yehey. She also played a main role as Brandy De la Paz in Precious Hearts Romances Presents: Mana Po before the show ended in late March.

In February 2015, Cantiveros became the winner of Your Face Sounds Familiar.

== Filmography ==
=== Television ===
Year	Title	Role	Notes	Ref.
2009–2010	Pinoy Big Brother: Double Up	Herself / Housemate	Big Winner	
2010	Kokey at Ako	Josa Reyes		
2010	Melason In Love	Herself		
2010	Melason: In Da City	Herself		
2010	Melason: Promdi Heart	Herself		
2010	Precious Hearts Romances Presents: Impostor	Devina "Devin" Ventura		
2010	Maalaala Mo Kaya	Pangga	Episode: "Toy Car"	
2010	Wansapanataym	Inday Vargas	Episode: "Inday Bote"	
2010–2013; 2015–present	ASAP	Herself / Co-host / Performer		
2010–2015	Banana Sundae	Herself / Various Characters		
2010	Showtime	Herself / Guest Judge		
2010	Matanglawin	Herself / Guest Co-host		
2011	Precious Hearts Romances Presents: Mana Po	Brandi Dela Paz		
2011	Maalaala Mo Kaya	Young Carol Araos	Episode: "Birth Certificate"	
2011	100 Days to Heaven	Girlie		
2011–2013	I Dare You	Herself / Co-host		
2011	Wansapanataym		Episode: "Wan Tru Lav"	
2011–2016	Kris TV	Herself / Co-host	Recurring	
2011–2012	Happy Yipee Yehey!	Herself / Co-host		
2012	Pinoy Big Brother: Unlimited	Herself — Houseguest		
2012	Wansapanataym	Bituin	Episode: "Dollhouse"	
2012	Maalaala Mo Kaya	Norma	Episode: "Baunan"	
2013	Wansapanataym	Pepay	Episode: "Number One Father & Son	
2013	Be Careful With My Heart	Gemma		
2013	Apoy sa Dagat	Paprika Mendoza		
2013–2014	Honesto	Cleopatra Batungbakal		
2014	Ikaw Lamang	Monica Miravelez	Guest role	
2014	Maalaala Mo Kaya	Nonette	Episode: "Jeep"	
2014	Ipaglaban Mo!	Elena	Episode: "Nang Dahil Sa Utang"	
2014	Wansapanataym	Dory	Episode: "Perfecto"	
2014	Two Wives	Carla		
2014	Umagang Kay Ganda	Herself / Co-host		
2015	Your Face Sounds Familiar	Herself	Grand Winner (season 1); Co-Host (season 2)	
2015	Wansapanataym	Beverly	Episode: "Noche Buena Gang"	
2015	Give Love on Christmas	Ruby	Episode: "Exchange Gift"	
2016	We Will Survive	Ma. Cecilia "Maricel" Rubio		
2016–2026	Magandang Buhay	Herself / Co-host		
2018–2019	Pinoy Big Brother: Otso	Herself / Co-host		
2020–2021	Pinoy Big Brother: Connect	Herself / Co-host		
2021–2022	Pinoy Big Brother: Kumunity Season 10	Herself / Co-host		
2022	The Chosen One: Soap Opera	Host / Jane Crame		
2023	PIEnalo	Herself / Co-host		
2023	Ur Da Boss	Herself / Main Host		
2023	It's Your Lucky Day	Herself / Co-host		
2024	TV Patrol	Herself / Guest Star Patroller		
2025	Pinoy Big Brother: Celebrity Collab Edition	Herself / Co-host		
2025	Pilipinas Got Talent season 7	Herself / Co-host		
2025	Pinoy Big Brother: Celebrity Collab Edition 2.0	Herself / Co-host		

=== Film ===
Year	Title	Role	Notes	Source
2010	I Do	Marian		
2011	The Adventures of Pureza, Queen of the Riles	Pureza		
2012	Larong Bata	Ms. De Regla		
2012	Sisterakas	Janet		
2014	Past Tense	Kelly		
2014	Shake, Rattle & Roll XV	Julie	Segment: "Ahas"	
2015	You're Still The One	Meanne		
2015	Sekyu			
2015	The Prenup	Choosy Cayabyab		
2018	DOTGA: Da One That Ghost Away	Annabelle	Special participation	
2018	Mary, Marry Me	Carey		
2019	Familia Blondina	Demonyita Melai		
2021	Momshies! Ang Soul Mo'y Akin	Mylene		
2021	The Exorsis	Jessa Mae		
2022	The Entitled	Yaya Monina		
2023	Ma'am Chief: Shakedown in Seoul	Police Exec. Msgt. Criselda Kaptan		
2025	My Love Will Make You Disappear	Cookie	Sounds only	

=== Webcast ===
Year	Title	Note(s)	Ref.
2024–present	Kuan on One	4 seasons; 54 episodes	

== Awards and nominations ==
Awards and nominations received by Melai Cantiveros
Award (Note: Awards, festivals, honors and other miscellaneous organizations are listed in alphabetical order.)	Year (Note: Indicates the year of ceremony. Each year is linked to the article about the awards held that year, wherever possible.)	Category	Nominee / Work	Result	Ref.
ASAP POP Viewers' Choice Awards	2010	Pop Fans Club	Melason	Won	
ASAP POP Viewers' Choice Awards	2011	Pop Movie Loveteam	The Adventures of Pureza: Queen of the Riles	Nominated	
Asia Artist Awards	2023	Best Actor Award	Ma'am Chief: Shakedown in Seoul	Won	
Asian Television Awards	2024	Best Quiz or Game Show Host	Ur Da Boss	Nominated	
Cosmopolitan Awards	2010	Fun Fearless Women	Herself	Won	
Global Awards for Outstanding Executives	2022	Events Host & Media Influencer	Herself	Won	
International Emmy Awards	2011	Best Telenovela	Impostor	Nominated	
PMPC Star Awards for Movies	2011	New Movie Actress of the Year	I Do	Nominated	
PMPC Star Awards for Television	2025	Best Reality Show Host	Pinoy Big Brother: Gen 11	Won	
PMPC Star Awards for Television	2023	Best Celebrity Talk Show Host	Magandang Buhay	Won	
PMPC Star Awards for Television	2021	Best Celebrity Talk Show Host	Magandang Buhay	Nominated	
PMPC Star Awards for Television	2019	Best Celebrity Talk Show Host	Magandang Buhay	Nominated	
PMPC Star Awards for Television	2018	Best Celebrity Talk Show Host	Magandang Buhay	Nominated	
PMPC Star Awards for Television	2017	Best Celebrity Talk Show Host	Magandang Buhay	Nominated	
PMPC Star Awards for Television	2016	Best Celebrity Talk Show Host	Magandang Buhay	Nominated	
PMPC Star Awards for Television	2014	Best Reality Show Host	I Dare You	Nominated	
PMPC Star Awards for Television	2010	New Female TV Personality	Melason	Nominated	

== Notes ==
Preceded by Ejay Falcon	Pinoy Big Brother; Big Winner; 2009–2010	Succeeded by (Australia) James Reid
Preceded by Beatriz Saw	Pinoy Big Brother Regular Season; Big Winner; 2009–2010	Succeeded by Slater Young
Preceded by First	Your Face Sounds Familiar (Philippine TV series); Winner; 2015	Succeeded by Denise Laurel
Preceded by First	Your Face Sounds Familiar (Philippine TV series) Regular Season; Winner; March 2015–June 2015	Succeeded by Denise Laurel
