= Magandang Buhay =

2016–26 Philippine television talk show

- Final title card from 2023 to 2026
- Genre: Talk show
- Written by: Darla Sauler; Marc Teodoro; Audrey Delizo
- Directed by: Arnel Natividad
- Presented by: Regine Velasquez; Melai Cantiveros; Jolina Magdangal
- Theme music composer: Jonathan Manalo
- Opening theme: "Magandang Buhay (2022 version)" by Regine Velasquez, Melai Cantiveros and Jolina Magdangal
- Country of origin: Philippines
- Original language: Filipino
- No. of episodes: 2,900 (final)

Production
- Executive producers: Carlo Katigbak; Cory Vidanes; Laurenti Dyogi
- Producers: Lui Andrada; Jasmin Pallera
- Production locations: Studio 9, ABS-CBN Broadcasting Center, Diliman, Quezon City
- Editors: Cecile Basaysay; Jonathan Wongkee
- Camera setup: Multiple-camera setup
- Running time: 90 minutes (2016–2020); 60 minutes (2020–2026)
- Production company: ABS-CBN Studios

Original release
- Network: ABS-CBN
- Release: April 18, 2016 – May 5, 2020
- Network: Kapamilya Channel (Note: The show also aired on its primary networks All TV (through its ABS-CBN licensing) and Kapamilya Channel as well as other affiliate channels and online platforms via Kapamilya Online Live through Facebook and YouTube. It is also available on-demand via iWant and internationally via The Filipino Channel.)
- Release: June 15, 2020 – June 26, 2026
- Network: TV5
- Release: February 6, 2023 – March 1, 2024
- Network: All TV
- Release: May 13, 2024 – June 26, 2026

Magandang Buhay (transl. Beautiful Life) is a Philippine television talk show that premiered on April 18, 2016 and was produced, trademark and copyright-registered by ABS-CBN Studios. The show was originally broadcast on ABS-CBN until the network's shutdown in 2020. It is later broadcast on Kapamilya Channel and A2Z, and aired every weekday at 09:00 (PST). The show was previously also broadcast on TV5 from February 6, 2023 until March 1, 2024 before it moved into All TV from May 13, 2024 until June 26, 2026. Reruns of past episodes continued to air on A2Z on June 29, 2026 every weekday at 08:30 (PST).

The original hosts of the show are Karla Estrada, Melai Cantiveros, and Jolina Magdangal. Estrada left the show in 2022 and was replaced by Regine Velasquez.

The show concluded on June 26, 2026 after more than 10 years due to episode redundancies since May 14, 2024 and poor ratings, as well as the hosts' other commitments, with Melai Cantiveros hosting her own talk show Kuan on One.

== History ==
Magandang Buhay premiered on ABS-CBN on April 18, 2016, every Monday to Friday at 07:30 (PST), replacing Kris TV. The title of the show is inspired by a popular line from the Philippine television drama series Dream Dad. On June 21, 2016, Magandang Buhay moved its time slot to 08:00 (PST).

On March 10, 2020, the admission of live audience members to the show was suspended following a public health emergency in response to the COVID-19 pandemic. The show was broadcast via Zoom on March 26 due to the COVID-19 pandemic's quarantine in Luzon.

On May 5, 2020, Magandang Buhay was suspended after ABS-CBN permanently ceased the free-to-air broadcast operations as ordered by the National Telecommunications Commission (under the leadership of Gamaliel Cordoba) and Solicitor General Jose Calida. Following the launch of Kapamilya Channel, the show resumed its live studio broadcast on June 15, 2020.

In 2022, Karla Estrada was on temporary leave due to her commitment to Tingog Party List in the Philippine House of Representatives elections. During Estrada's absence, Regine Velasquez and Judy Ann Santos each served as guest co-hosts. On July 22, 2022, Estrada returned in a taped episode, marking her final appearance on the program after six years. On August 8, Velasquez officially became a regular host in the talk show.

In a trade event of TV5 Network, Inc. on November 23, 2022, it was announced that Magandang Buhay would be part of the network's programming line-up. The show aired on TV5 from February 6, 2023 to March 1, 2024. On May 13, 2024, the show had begun its simulcast on All TV, marking its return to channels 2 and 16 in Mega Manila and regional channels previously held by ABS-CBN. This occurred just a month after ABS-CBN Corporation and All TV's owner, Advanced Media Broadcasting System (AMBS), signed content agreements to air ABS-CBN programs on All TV.

== Final Hosts ==
Hosts

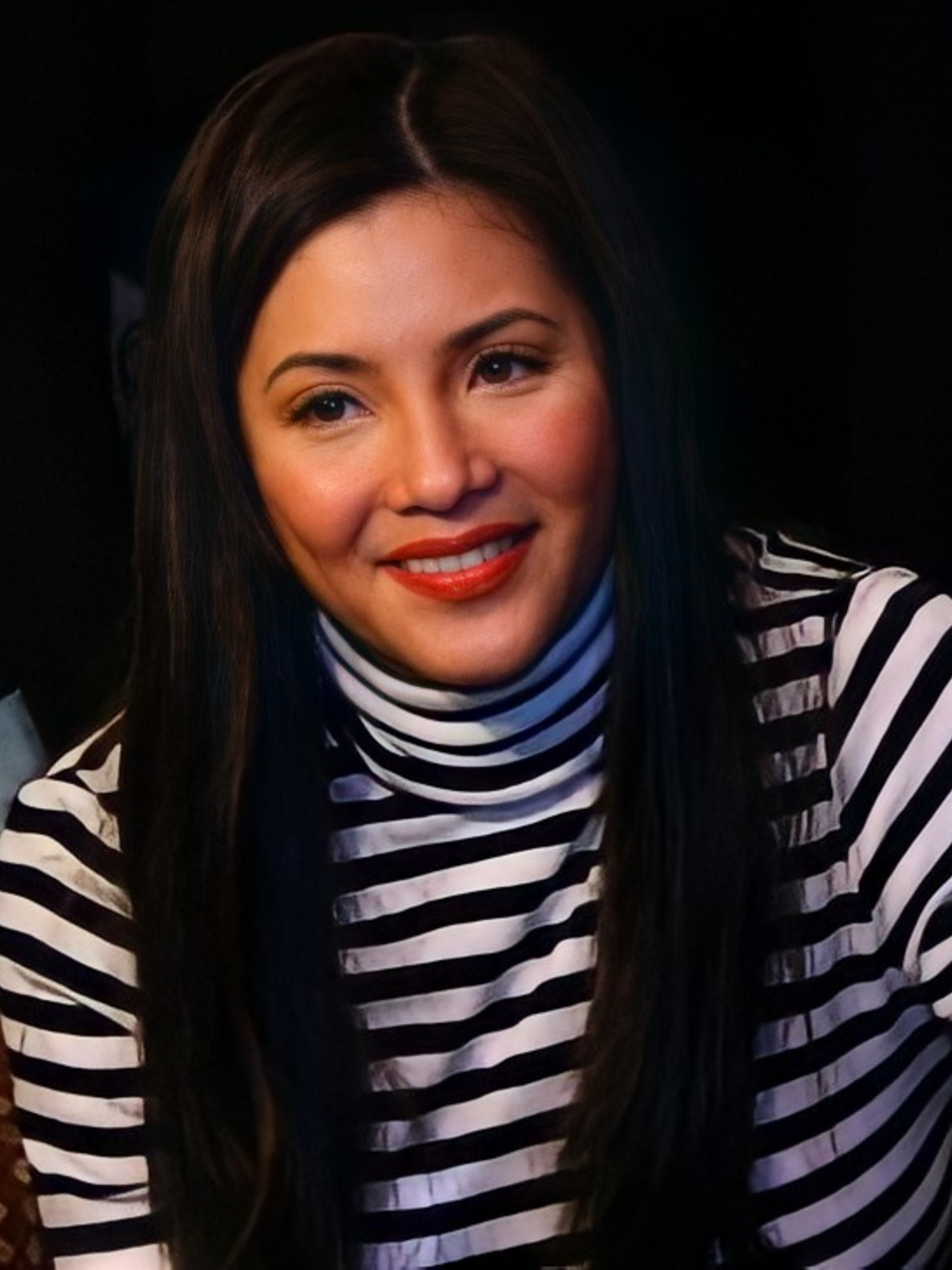
Regine Velasquez

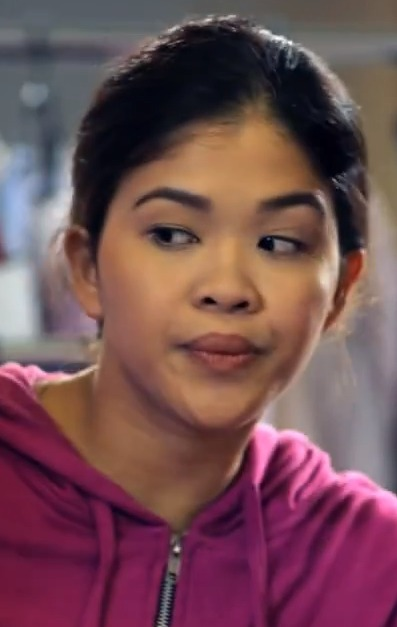
Melai Cantiveros

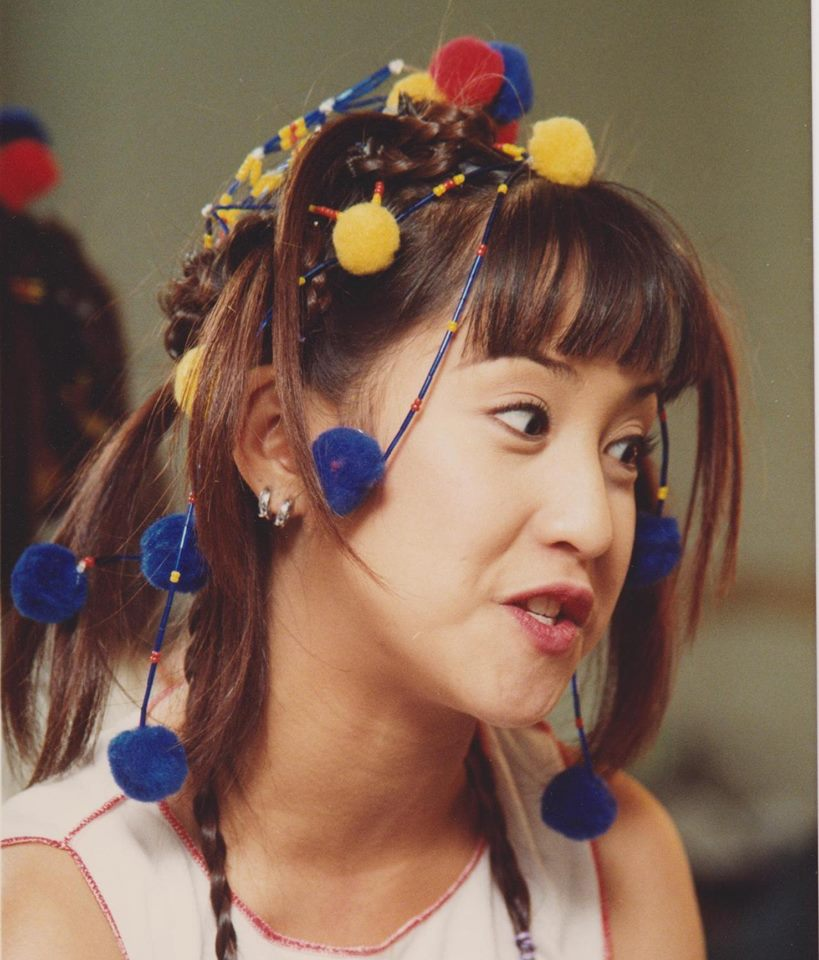
Jolina Magdangal

Final Main hosts

- Regine Velasquez
- Melai Cantiveros
- Jolina Magdangal

Final Segment host

- Hanz Cua

Former host

- Karla Estrada (2016–22)

Guest co-hosts

- Bianca Gonzalez
- Cristine Reyes
- Dimples Romana
- Jodi Sta. Maria
- Janice de Belen
- Precious Lara Quigaman
- Sunshine Dizon
- Tuesday Vargas
- Gelli de Belen
- Ogie Diaz
- Judy Ann Santos
