= The Voice Kids (Philippine TV series) season 3 =

The Voice Kids
- Season 3
- Hosted by: Luis Manzano
- Coaches: Lea Salonga; Bamboo Mañalac; Sharon Cuneta
- Winner: Joshua Oliveros
- Winning coach: Lea Salonga
- Runner-up: Antonetthe Tismo

Release
- Original network: ABS-CBN
- Original release: May 28 – August 28, 2016

Season chronology
- ← Previous; Season 2 Next → Season 4

The third season of The Voice Kids was a Philippine reality singing competition on ABS-CBN. Lea Salonga and Bamboo Mañalac returned to the show as coaches. Sarah Geronimo left the show to focus on her other projects, such as ASAP, and a new album. As a result, Sharon Cuneta replaced her as a coach. Luis Manzano and Robi Domingo returned to host the show; however, Yeng Constantino was replaced by Kim Chiu. Constantino didn't return to the show due to her earlier commitments with some other programs.

It aired May 28 to August 28, 2016, replacing the fifth season of Pilipinas Got Talent and was replaced by Pinoy Boyband Superstar. It airs 7:15 p.m. (PST) every Saturdays; and 7 p.m. (PST) every Sundays.

Joshua Oliveros of FamiLea as the winner, the first male grand champion in the show to do so and marking Salonga's first win in the show as coach.

== Developments ==
After the finale of the second season of The Voice Kids, it was announced that the show will have a third season.

=== Coaches ===
The coaches and hosts of the third season of The Voice Kids

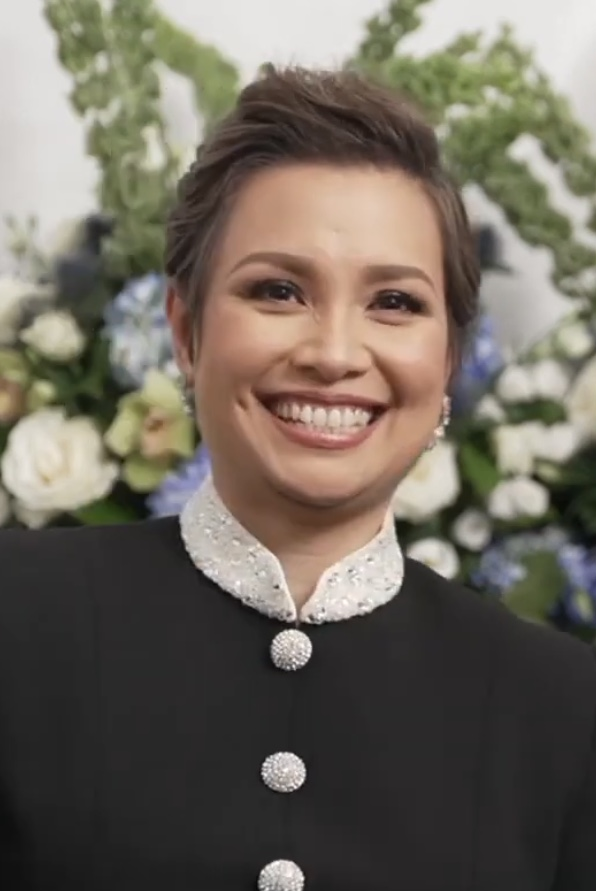
Lea Salonga

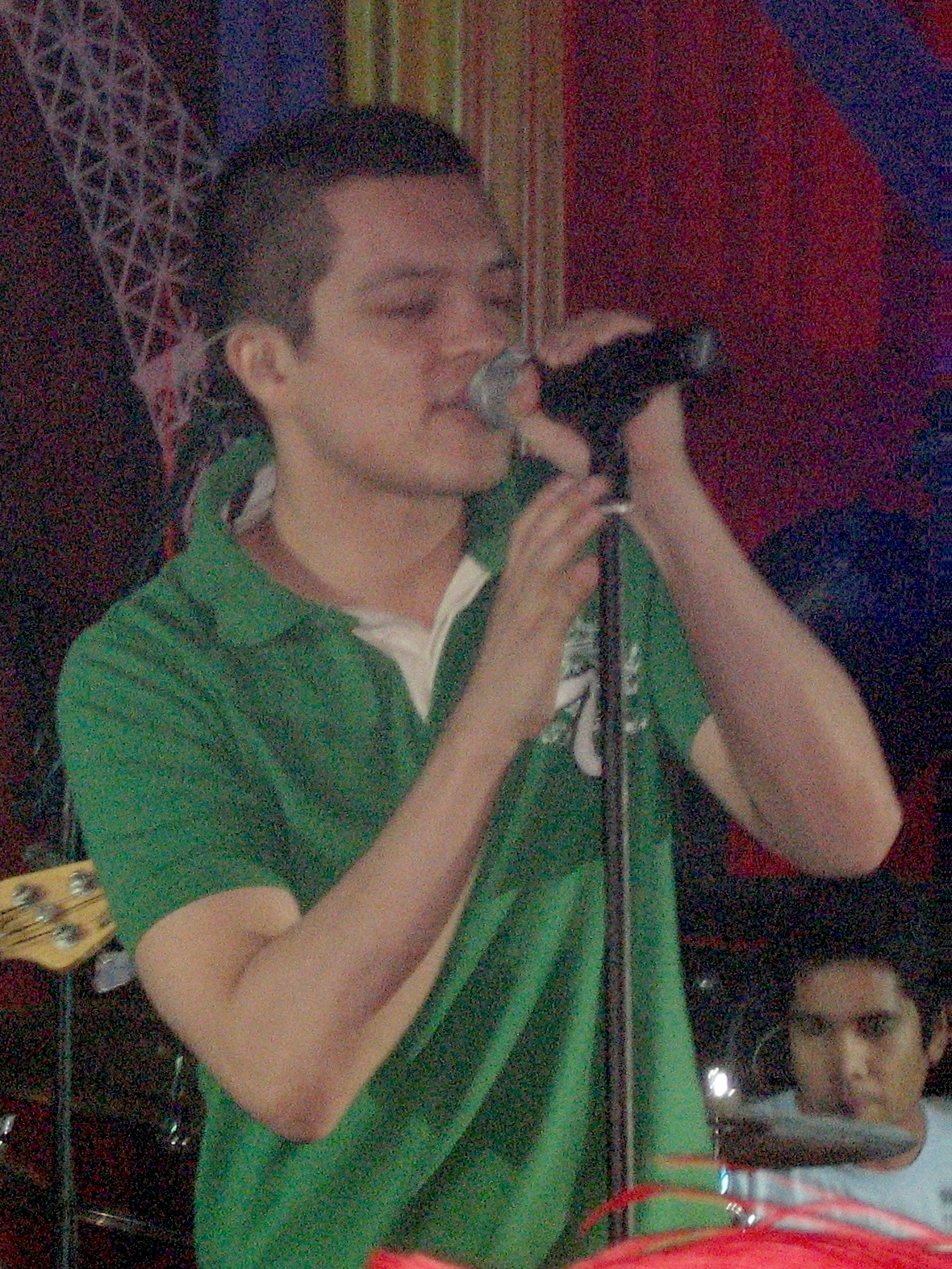
Bamboo Mañalac

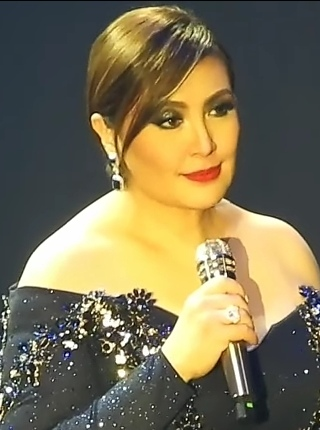
Sharon Cuneta

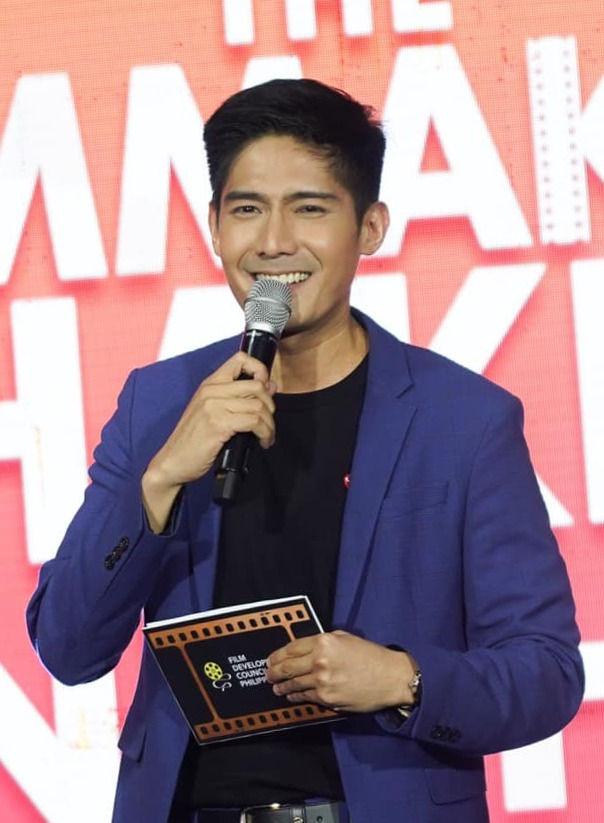
Robi Domingo

Lea Salonga confirmed on an interview that she will be returning for the third season of The Voice Kids; Bamboo Mañalac was also confirmed to return to the show. However, it was announced that Sarah Geronimo will no longer serve as a coach on its third season to focus more on her career as an artist. Rumors circulated that Sharon Cuneta will replace Sarah on the show. On May 2, 2016, she confirmed that she is the new The Voice Kids coach.

=== Hosts ===
Luis Manzano and Robi Domingo were slated to return as hosts of the show. However, Yeng Constantino was not able to return to the show due to her earlier commitments with It's Showtime as a judge of the segment Tawag ng Tanghalan and with We Love OPM as a mentor and she was replaced by Kim Chiu.

=== Auditions ===
Cities in the Philippines where the auditions for the third season of The Voice Kids were held.

The ages of the auditionees were reduced to 6–13 years old; in the previous season, it was 7–13 years old.

On-ground auditions of The Voice Kids
Date	Venue	City	Ref.
April 6, 2016	Pacific Mall Lucena	Lucena, Quezon	
January 10, 2016	Pinoy Big Brother Hall	Quezon City, Metro Manila	
October 17, 2015	CityMall Consolacion	Consolacion, Cebu	
October 17, 2015	Robinsons Place Palawan	Puerto Princesa, Palawan	
October 17, 2015	CityMall Tagbak	Tagbak, Jaro, Iloilo City	
October 10 and 11, 2015	Starmall EDSA-Shaw	Mandaluyong, Metro Manila	
October 10 and 11, 2015	Starmall San Jose del Monte	San Jose del Monte, Bulacan	
October 10 and 11, 2015	Robinsons Place Lipa	Lipa, Batangas	
October 3 and 4, 2015	Robinsons Place Pangasinan	Calasiao, Pangasinan	
October 3 and 4, 2015	Pacific Mall Legazpi	Legazpi, Albay	
October 3 and 4, 2015	Robinsons Starmills	San Fernando, Pampanga	
September 26 and 27, 2015	Robinsons Sta Rosa	Santa Rosa, Laguna	
September 26 and 27, 2015	Starmall Prima Taguig	Taguig, Metro Manila	
September 26 and 27, 2015	Robinsons Starmills	Alabang, Muntinlupa, Metro Manila	
September 19 and 20, 2015	Pacific Mall Cebu	Mandaue, Cebu	
September 19 and 20, 2015	Pacific Mall Lucena	Lucena, Quezon	
September 19 and 20, 2015	Robinsons Novaliches	Novaliches, Quezon City, Metro Manila	
September 12 and 13, 2015	Starmall Las Piñas	Las Piñas, Metro Manila	
September 12 and 13, 2015	Dragon8 Mall Divisoria	Divisoria, Manila, Metro Manila	
September 12 and 13, 2015	Gaisano Mall of Toril	Toril, Davao City	
September 6 and 7, 2015	CityMall Arnaldo–Roxas	Roxas City, Capiz	
September 6 and 7, 2015	CityMall Anabu–Imus	Anabu, Imus, Cavite	
September 6 and 7, 2015	Resorts World Manila	Pasay, Metro Manila	

== Teams ==
Color key:

- Winner
- Runner-up
- Third place
- Eliminated in the Live shows
- Eliminated in the Sing-offs
- Eliminated in the Battles

Coaches	Top 72 artists					
Lea Salonga (FamiLea)						
Lea Salonga (FamiLea)	Joshua Oliveros	Yessha dela Calzada	Ragen Angel Peñaflor	Noel Comia Jr.	Yssa Marie West	Peter Vallejos
Lea Salonga (FamiLea)	Kate Escol	Wayneheart Geonzon	Alfred Baja	Matthew Esconde	Julian Lascota	Nirro Bautista
Lea Salonga (FamiLea)	Carmela Lorzano	Saisha Rae Masirag	Marcuz Bracia	Gabie Mendoza	Natalie Zarene Martinez	Maegan Frondoso
Lea Salonga (FamiLea)	Maria Krischellei Robles	Al Vincent Casela	Henli Asueros	Joseph Miraflores	Hannah Faye Miguel	Eleana Gabunada
Bamboo Mañalac (Kamp Kawayan)						
Bamboo Mañalac (Kamp Kawayan)	Justin John Alva	Wyllian Heart Salvador	Xylein Herrera	Ezra and Elisha Villaluz	Princess Aliyah Rabara	Kenneth Agustin Bardinas
Bamboo Mañalac (Kamp Kawayan)	Bernard Badato	Kyle Philippe Mallari	Aiken Ramos	Thaddeus Salazar	Arnie Maun	Hans Gerald Santos
Bamboo Mañalac (Kamp Kawayan)	Maxine Manzano	Shantii Lim	Bien Makisig Aduca	Bea Roa	Geleina Soriano	Romalyn Quezon
Bamboo Mañalac (Kamp Kawayan)	Cahil Manila	Mark Ahron Cabalona	Miguel Suarez	Alyssa Suzuki	Jean Flores	Julianah Agatha Cruz
Sharon Cuneta (Team Sharon)						
Sharon Cuneta (Team Sharon)	Antonetthe Tismo	Alvin Dahan	John Carlo Tan	Sharla Mae Cerilles	Gella Vergara	Hannah Hakami
Sharon Cuneta (Team Sharon)	Ian Joseph Prelligera	Timoty Pepito	Cyd Pangca	John Paul Gumandoy	John Lozada	Yohance Buie
Sharon Cuneta (Team Sharon)	Krisha Aler	Jhie Anne Guinoo	Beatrice Mariel Ong	Gabrielle Soldevilla	Althea Mignonette Pinzon	Jiewhel Elmido
Sharon Cuneta (Team Sharon)	Dannah Alexa Arciaga	Aradel Bascruz	Yuliyah Agraviador	Memphis Malapad	Patricia Medalla	Misha de Leon

== Blind auditions ==
During the Blind auditions, each coach must now form a team of 24 young artists, instead of the usual 18 during the first and second seasons.

It aired from May 28 to July 16 for 15 episodes with a total of 90 aspiring contestants.

Color key

✔	Coach hit his/her "I WANT YOU" button
	Artist defaulted to this coach's team
	Artist elected to join this coach's team
	Artist eliminated with no coach pressing his or her "I WANT YOU" button

=== Episode 1 (May 28) ===
The first episode was graced by an opening number from the coaches wherein they sang "Heroes" from Alesso.

Order	Artist	Age	Hometown	Song	Coach's and contestant's choices		
Order	Artist	Age	Hometown	Song	Lea	Bamboo	Sharon
1	Yessha dela Calzada	7	Cebu City	"Saan Darating Ang Umaga"	✔	✔	✔
2	Xylein Herrera	12	Boracay, Malay, Aklan	"Raggamuffin"	✔	✔	✔
3	Noel Comia Jr.	11	Batangas City	"Can This Be Love"	✔	–	✔
4	John Paul Gumandoy	9	Liloan, Cebu	"Anak"	✔	✔	✔

=== Episode 2 (May 29) ===
Order	Artist	Age	Hometown	Song	Coach's and contestant's choices		
Order	Artist	Age	Hometown	Song	Lea	Bamboo	Sharon
1	Yuliyah Agraviador	6	San Mateo, Rizal	"Uptown Funk"	–	–	✔
2	Peter Vallejos	9	Las Piñas, Metro Manila	"One Call Away"	✔	✔	–
3	Baina Kae Pangan	8	Taguig, Metro Manila	"Ang Buhay Ko"	–	–	–
4	Eleana Gabunada	7	Parañaque, Metro Manila	"Fight Song"	✔	✔	✔
5	Timoty Pepito	6	San Jose del Monte, Bulacan	"Natutulog Ba ang Diyos?"	✔	–	✔

=== Episode 3 (June 4) ===
Order	Artist	Age	Hometown	Song	Coach's and contestant's choices		
Order	Artist	Age	Hometown	Song	Lea	Bamboo	Sharon
1	Yohance Buie	10	Antipolo, Rizal	"Macho Gwapito"	✔	–	✔
2	Natalie Zarene Martinez	11	Cabanatuan	"Defying Gravity"	✔	–	✔
3	Justin John Alva	12	Lucena City	"The Search Is Over"	✔	✔	✔
4	Matthew Joshua Esconde	7	Subic, Zambales	"What Makes You Beautiful"	✔	– ^{[a]}	✔

Notes

a. Despite Bamboo Manalac not turning for Matthew Esconde, the latter attempted to choose him as his coach.

=== Episode 4 (June 5) ===
Order	Artist	Age	Hometown	Song	Coach's and contestant's choices		
Order	Artist	Age	Hometown	Song	Lea	Bamboo	Sharon
1	Memphis Malapad	7	Olongapo City, Zambales	"Buko"	–	–	✔
2	Aiken Ramos	12	Baguio	"Jeepney Love Story"	✔	✔	✔
3	Gab Beaniza	8	Roxas City, Capiz	"My Way"	–	–	–
4	Saisha Rae Masirag	7	Parañaque, Metro Manila	"Lupa Man Ay Langit Na Rin"	✔	✔	✔
5	Antonetthe Tismo	13	Parañaque, Metro Manila	"Sayang Na Sayang"	✔	✔	✔

=== Episode 5 (June 11) ===
Order	Artist	Age	Hometown	Song	Coach's and contestant's choices		
Order	Artist	Age	Hometown	Song	Lea	Bamboo	Sharon
1	Hannah Faye Miguel	8	Santa Ana, Pampanga	"Malayo Pa Ang Umaga"	✔	–	✔
2	Althea Mignonette Pinzon	10	Calamba, Laguna	"Hulog Ng Langit"	✔	–	✔
3	Gabie Mendoza	11	San Juan, Metro Manila	"Mr. Kupido"	✔	✔	✔
4	Hans Gerald Santos	9	Quezon City, Metro Manila	"Cups"	–	✔	–
5	Alvin Dahan	13	Davao City	"Bukas Na Lang Kita Mamahalin"	✔	✔	✔

=== Episode 6 (June 12) ===
Order	Artist	Age	Hometown	Song	Coach's and contestant's choices		
Order	Artist	Age	Hometown	Song	Lea	Bamboo	Sharon
1	Alyssa Suzuki	10	Marilao, Bulacan	"Ngayon"	✔	✔	✔
2	Kate Escol	12	Meycauayan, Bulacan	"Don't Cry Out Loud"	✔	–	✔
3	Rahdni	N/A	N/A	"Ibong Ligaw"	–	–	–
4	John Kenneth	N/A	N/A	"To Love You More"	–	–	–
5	Omar	N/A	N/A	"Pangako Sa'yo"	–	–	–
6	Bien Makisig Aduca	10	Tarlac	"If I Sing You a Love Song"	–	✔	–
7	Sharla Mae Cerilles	12	Parañaque, Metro Manila	"Power of Love"	✔	✔	✔

=== Episode 7 (June 18) ===
Order	Artist	Age	Hometown	Song	Coach's and contestant's choices		
Order	Artist	Age	Hometown	Song	Lea	Bamboo	Sharon
1	Yedda Lambujon	12	Cainta, Rizal	"Proud Mary"	–	–	–
2	Carmela Lorzano	7	Batangas	"Tomorrow"	✔	✔	✔
3	John Carlo Tan	11	Tondo, Manila, Metro Manila	"Narito"	–	✔	✔
4	Krisha Aler	10	Marikina, Metro Manila	"Through the Rain"	✔	✔	✔
5	Romalyn Quezon	11	Nueva Ecija	"Usok"	–	✔	–

=== Episode 8 (June 19) ===
Order	Artist	Age	Hometown	Song	Coach's and contestant's choices		
Order	Artist	Age	Hometown	Song	Lea	Bamboo	Sharon
1	Maricar Fortus	12	Imus, Cavite	"Dance with My Father"	–	–	–
2	Beatrice Mariel Ong	10	Cainta, Rizal	"Clarity"	✔	–	✔
3	Kenneth Agustin Bardinas	11	Davao del Norte	"All of Me"	–	✔	–
4	Julianah Agatha Cruz	13	Quezon City, Metro Manila	"Tunay Na Mahal"	–	✔	–
5	Joshua Oliveros	11	Hamtic, Antique	"Habang May Buhay"	✔	–	–
6	Miguel Suarez	9	Antipolo, Rizal	"Hallelujah"	✔	✔	✔

=== Episode 9 (June 25) ===
Order	Artist	Age	Hometown	Song	Coach's and contestant's choices		
Order	Artist	Age	Hometown	Song	Lea	Bamboo	Sharon
1	Hannah Hakami	11	Butuan	"Who Says"	✔	✔	✔
2	Kristian Yap	9	Quezon City, Metro Manila	"Rockin' Robin"	–	–	–
3	Cyd Ira Pangca	8	Quezon, Bukidnon	"You Are My Song"	–	–	✔
4	Elisha and Ezra Villaluz	11 & 11	Alaminos, Laguna	"Like I'm Gonna Lose You"	✔	✔	✔
5	Gella Vergara	8	Cebu City	"Somewhere"	✔	✔	✔

=== Episode 10 (June 26) ===
Order	Artist	Age	Hometown	Song	Coach's and contestant's choices		
Order	Artist	Age	Hometown	Song	Lea	Bamboo	Sharon
1	Ian Joseph Prelligera	7	Ligao City, Albay	"Wag Ka Nang Umiyak"	✔	✔	✔
2	Bea Roa	10	Bacoor, Cavite	"Fame"	–	✔	–
3	Patricia Medalla	9	San Mateo, Rizal	"You'll Never Walk Alone"	–	✔	✔
4	Wyllian Heart Salvador	10	Muntinlupa, Metro Manila	"Hello"	–	✔	✔
5	Wayneheart Claire Geonzon	6	Quezon City	"Music and Me"	✔	✔	✔

=== Episode 11 (July 2) ===
Order	Artist	Age	Hometown	Song	Coach's and contestant's choices		
Order	Artist	Age	Hometown	Song	Lea	Bamboo	Sharon
1	Yssa Marie West	10	Honolulu, Hawaii, USA	"I Wanna Dance with Somebody"	✔	✔	✔
2	Jean Arianne Flores	12	Alaminos, Laguna	"One Night Only"	✔	✔	✔
3	Geleina Soriano	10	Porac, Pampanga	"Himala"	–	✔	✔
4	John Lozada	12	Roxas City, Capiz	"Oras Na"	✔	✔	✔
5	Joseph Miraflores	10	Antipolo, Rizal	"Tuwing Umuulan"	✔	✔	✔
6	Alfred Baja	11	Batangas	"Separate Ways"	✔	✔	✔

=== Episode 12 (July 3) ===
Order	Artist	Age	Hometown	Song	Coach's and contestant's choices		
Order	Artist	Age	Hometown	Song	Lea	Bamboo	Sharon
1	Marcuz Bracia	7	Bacacay, Albay	"Drag Me Down"	✔	–	✔
2	Aisling Cully	11	Alabang, Muntinlupa, Metro Manila	"Mr. DJ"	–	–	–
3	Mark Ahron Cabalona	11	Cabanatuan, Nueva Ecija	"I'm Not the Only One"	–	✔	✔
4	Maegan Frondoso	11	Plaridel, Bulacan	"Because of You"	✔	✔	✔
5	Dannah Alexa Arciaga	9	San Jose del Monte, Bulacan	"The Voice Within"	✔	–	✔
6	Princess Aliya Rabara	7	Marilao, Bulacan	"I'm in Love with a Monster"	✔	✔	✔

=== Episode 13 (July 9) ===
Order	Artist	Age	Hometown	Song	Coach's and contestant's choices		
Order	Artist	Age	Hometown	Song	Lea	Bamboo	Sharon
1	Gabrielle Soldevilla	11	Malabon, Metro Manila	"Break Free"	✔	–	✔
2	Jhie Anne Guinoo	9	Malolos, Bulacan	"Kailangan Ko'y Ikaw"	✔	✔	✔
3	Kyle Philippe Mallari	13	Quezon City, Metro Manila	"Skyscraper"	–	✔	–
4	Maria Krischellei Robles	11	Malabon, Metro Manila	"Via Dolorosa"	✔	–	✔
5	Maxine Manzano	11	Caloocan, Metro Manila	"Chinito"	–	✔	–
6	Dane Calesa	8	Cainta, Rizal	"Wag Ka Nang Umiyak"	–	–	–
7	Ragen Angel Peñaflor	12	Biñan, Laguna	"Starting Over Again"	✔	–	✔

=== Episode 14 (July 10) ===
Order	Artist	Age	Hometown	Song	Coach's and contestant's choices		
Order	Artist	Age	Hometown	Song	Lea	Bamboo	Sharon
1	Lucas Gabayeron	8	Iloilo	"Imagine"	–	–	–
2	Star Gonzales	9	Cebu	"Work from Home"	–	–	–
3	Kaisha Montinola	9	Cebu	"Girls Just Want to Have Fun"	–	–	–
4	Thaddeus Salazar	13	Tondo, Manila, Metro Manila	"Jar of Hearts"	–	✔	–
5	Shantii Lim	11	Davao City	"Mahal Kita Pero"	✔	✔	✔
6	Julian Lascota	9	Caloocan, Metro Manila	"Think of Laura"	✔	–	–
7	Nirro Bautista	11	Lipa, Batangas	"I'll Be There"	✔	–	–
8	Arnie Maun	9	Candaba, Pampanga	"Saan Darating Ang Umaga"	–	✔	–
9	Bernard Badato	12	Mercedes, Camarines Norte	"Bulag, Pipi at Bingi"	✔	✔	✔

=== Episode 15 (July 16) ===
Order	Artist	Age	Hometown	Song	Coach's and contestant's choices		
Order	Artist	Age	Hometown	Song	Lea	Bamboo	Sharon
1	Aradel Bascruz	12	Cabuyao, Laguna	"Ikaw"	–	✔	✔
2	Jiewel Elmido	12	Santa Rosa, Laguna	"Tadhana"	–	–	✔
3	Henli Asueros	12	Davao City	"We Built This City"	✔	–	–
4	Al Vincent Casela	12	Bayambang, Pangasinan	"It Will Rain"	✔	✔	✔
5	Lisa	N/A	N/A	"You Light Up My Life"	Team full	–	–
6	Allouette	N/A	N/A	"Hello"	Team full	–	–
7	Cahil Manila	12	Makati, Metro Manila	"Ikot-Ikot"	Team full	✔	✔
8	Coreine	N/A	N/A	"The Impossible Dream"	Team full	Team full	–
9	Twinkle	N/A	N/A	"Dadalhin"	Team full	Team full	–
10	Joana	N/A	N/A	"Set Fire to the Rain"	Team full	Team full	–
11	Misha de Leon	10	Santa Rosa, Laguna	"Bituing Walang Ningning"	Team full	Team full	✔

== The Battles ==
72 artists advanced to the Battles. This part of the competition followed the format of the previous season wherein three artists pit for one of the eight spots per team in the Sing-offs. The Battles aired on July 17, 2016.

Color key

Artist was chosen by his/her coach to advance to the Sing-offs
Artist was eliminated

Episode	Coach	Order	Artists			Song	Source
Episode 16 (July 17)	Lea Salonga	1	Eleana Gabunada	Hannah Faye Miguel	Yessha dela Calzada	"Rain"	
Episode 16 (July 17)	Bamboo Mañalac	2	Kyle Philippe Mallari	Julianah Agatha Cruz	Thaddeus Salazar	"Almost Is Never Enough"	
Episode 16 (July 17)	Lea Salonga	3	Joseph Miraflores	Henli Asueros	Noel Comia Jr.	"Growing Up"	
Episode 16 (July 17)	Sharon Cuneta	4	Misha de Leon	Antonetthe Tismo	Patricia Medalla	"I Turn to You"	
Episode 17 (July 23)	Bamboo Mañalac	1	Miguel Suarez	Arnie Maun	Bernard Badato	"Doo Bidoo"	
Episode 17 (July 23)	Lea Salonga	2	Maria Krischellei Robles	Nirro Bautista	Ragen Angel Peñaflor	"Empire State of Mind (Part II) Broken Down"	
Episode 17 (July 23)	Sharon Cuneta	3	Timoty Pepito	Yuliyah Agraviador	Memphis Malapad	"Hataw Na"	
Episode 17 (July 23)	Lea Salonga	4	Natalie Zarene Martinez	Joshua Oliveros	Maegan Frondoso	"Ngayon at Kailanman"	
Episode 18 (July 24)	Bamboo Mañalac	1	Kenneth Agustin Bardinas	Aiken Ramos	Mark Ahron Cabalona	"Hari ng Sablay"	
Episode 18 (July 24)	Lea Salonga	2	Alfred Baja	Kate Escol	Al Vincent Casela	"Counting Stars"	
Episode 18 (July 24)	Sharon Cuneta	3	Dannah Alexa Arciaga	John Paul Gumandoy	Ian Joseph Prelligera	"Kailangan Kita"	
Episode 18 (July 24)	Bamboo Mañalac	4	Hans Gerald Santos	Justin John Alva	Romalyn Quezon	"I Won't Give Up"	
Episode 19 (July 30)	Lea Salonga	1	Saisha Rae Masirag	Carmela Lorzano	Peter Vallejos	"Bonggahan"	
Episode 19 (July 30)	Sharon Cuneta	2	Hannah Hakami	Jiewhel Elmido	Althea Mignonette Pinzon	"Focus"	
Episode 19 (July 30)	Bamboo Mañalac	3	Princess Aliya Rabara	Bien Makisig Aduca	Bea Roa	"Dream a Little Dream"	
Episode 19 (July 30)	Sharon Cuneta	4	Gabrielle Soldevilla	Beatrice Mariel Ong	Alvin Dahan	"I Believe I Can Fly"	
Episode 20 (July 31)	Lea Salonga	1	Gabie Mendoza	Julian Lascota	Yssa Marie West	"Walking on Sunshine"	
Episode 20 (July 31)	Bamboo Mañalac	2	Maxine Manzano	Shantii Lim	Xylein Herrera	"Can't Stop the Feeling"	
Episode 20 (July 31)	Sharon Cuneta	3	Jhie Anne Guinoo	Cyd Pangca	Gella Vergara	"Healing"	
Episode 20 (July 31)	Bamboo Mañalac	4	Geleina Soriano	Ezra and Elisha Villaluz	Alyssa Suzuki	"Emotion"	
Episode 21 (August 06)	Lea Salonga	1	Marcuz Bracia	Wayneheart Claire Geonzon	Matthew Joshua Esconde	"Born This Way/Express Yourself"	
Episode 21 (August 06)	Sharon Cuneta	2	Yohance Buie	John Lozada	John Carlo Tan	"Pusong Ligaw"	
Episode 21 (August 06)	Bamboo Mañalac	3	Cahil Manila	Wyllian Heart Salvador	Jean Flores	"Mirrors"	
Episode 21 (August 06)	Sharon Cuneta	4	Sharla Mae Cerilles	Krisha Aler	Aradel Bascruz	"On the Wings of Love"	

== The Sing-offs ==
24 artists advanced to the Sing-Offs. This part of the competition followed the format of the previous season wherein remaining artists pit for one of the spots per team in the Live Shows. Instead of having two artists per team, three artists per team advanced to the Live Shows.

Color key

Artist was picked by his/her coach to advance to the live shows
Artist was eliminated

Episode	Coach	Order	Artist	Song	Result
Episode 22 (August 7)	Lea Salonga				
Episode 22 (August 7)	Lea Salonga	1	Yessha dela Calzada	"River Deep, Mountain High"	Advanced
Episode 22 (August 7)	Lea Salonga	2	Noel Comia Jr.	"Kailan"	Eliminated
Episode 22 (August 7)	Lea Salonga	3	Yssa West	"Try"	Eliminated
Episode 22 (August 7)	Lea Salonga	4	Angel Peñaflor	"Hanggang"	Advanced
Episode 22 (August 7)	Lea Salonga	5	Peter Vallejos	"Simpleng Tao"	Eliminated
Episode 22 (August 7)	Lea Salonga	6	Kate Escol	"Hero"	Eliminated
Episode 22 (August 7)	Lea Salonga	7	Claire Geonzon	"Ben"	Eliminated
Episode 22 (August 7)	Lea Salonga	8	Joshua Oliveros	"Ikaw"	Advanced
Episode 23 (August 13)	Sharon Cuneta				
Episode 23 (August 13)	Sharon Cuneta	1	Gella Vergara	"Love on Top"	Eliminated
Episode 23 (August 13)	Sharon Cuneta	2	Ian Prelligera	Natatawa Ako	Eliminated
Episode 23 (August 13)	Sharon Cuneta	3	Hannah Hakami	"Unwritten"	Eliminated
Episode 23 (August 13)	Sharon Cuneta	4	JC Tan	"One Moment in Time"	Advanced
Episode 23 (August 13)	Sharon Cuneta	5	Antonetthe Tismo	"Titanium"	Advanced
Episode 23 (August 13)	Sharon Cuneta	6	Timoty Pepito	"Panalangin"	Eliminated
Episode 23 (August 13)	Sharon Cuneta	7	Alvin Dahan	"Through the Fire"	Advanced
Episode 23 (August 13)	Sharon Cuneta	8	Sharla Cerilles	"Narito Ako"	Eliminated
Episode 24 (August 14)	Bamboo Manalac				
Episode 24 (August 14)	Bamboo Manalac	1	Kenneth Bardinas	"May Bukas Pa"	Eliminated
Episode 24 (August 14)	Bamboo Manalac	2	Xylein Herrera	"Photograph"	Advanced
Episode 24 (August 14)	Bamboo Manalac	3	Princess Rabara	"The Prayer"	Eliminated
Episode 24 (August 14)	Bamboo Manalac	4	Heart Salvador	"On My Own"	Advanced
Episode 24 (August 14)	Bamboo Manalac	5	Ezra and Elisha Villaluz	"Brown Eyes"	Eliminated
Episode 24 (August 14)	Bamboo Manalac	6	Kyle Mallari	"Stay With Me"	Eliminated
Episode 24 (August 14)	Bamboo Manalac	7	Bernard Badato	"Ikaw Lang Ang Mamahalin"	Eliminated
Episode 24 (August 14)	Bamboo Manalac	8	Justin Alva	"7 Years"	Advanced

== Live shows ==
=== Results summary ===
Color key
Artist's info

- Artist from FamiLea
- Artist from Kamp Kawayan
- Artist from Team Sharon

Result details

- Artist was saved after receiving the highest public votes
- Artist was eliminated
- Artist was proclaimed as the winner
- Artist was proclaimed as the runner-up and third placer

Live show results per week
Artist	Week 1	Week 2
Joshua Oliveros	Safe	Winner
Antonetthe Tismo	Safe	Runner-up
Justin Alva	Safe	Third Place
Heart Salvador	Eliminated	Eliminated (Week 1)
Yessha dela Calzada	Eliminated	Eliminated (Week 1)
Alvin Dahan	Eliminated	Eliminated (Week 1)
Xylein Herrera	Eliminated	Eliminated (Week 1)
Angel Peñaflor	Eliminated	Eliminated (Week 1)
JC Tan	Eliminated	Eliminated (Week 1)
References		

=== Live shows details ===
The Live shows were held in Newport Performing Arts Theater, Resorts World Manila, Newport City, Pasay from August 20 until August 28, 2016.

This season followed the format from the previous seasons wherein the outcome of the Live shows were solely from the results of the public's votes. For the third season, since there were nine artists, there were some adjustments to the voting system over the course of the semifinals. After the performance of every three artists per coach, the public got to vote on who should advance to the grand finals. Voting was done during the commercial break and closed once the show goes back.

The top three artists (one per team) came from the results of the public votes advanced to the Finals. The public was only allowed to vote once per mobile number per weekend night.

Color key

Artist was saved by the public's vote
Artist was eliminated

==== Week 1: Semifinals (August 20 & 21) ====
The second night (August 21), the live shows of Coach Lea's three finalists, was also graced by a musical number featuring the champions of the past seasons of The Voice Kids, Lyca Gairanod and Elha Nympha, together with the champions of The Voice of the Philippines, Mitoy Yonting and Jason Dy.

Episode	Coach	Order	Artist	Song	Votes	Result
Episode 25 (August 20)	Sharon Cuneta					
Episode 25 (August 20)	Sharon Cuneta	1	Antonetthe Tismo	"Paano Bang Mangarap"	58.36%	Advanced
Episode 25 (August 20)	Sharon Cuneta	2	JC Tan	"You Raise Me Up"	8.65%	Eliminated
Episode 25 (August 20)	Sharon Cuneta	3	Alvin Dahan	"Pangarap Ko Ang Ibigin Ka"	32.98%	Eliminated
Episode 25 (August 20)	Bamboo Manalac					
Episode 25 (August 20)	Bamboo Manalac	1	Justin Alva	"Open Arms"	47.08%	Advanced
Episode 25 (August 20)	Bamboo Manalac	2	Heart Salvador	"Turning Tables"	35.12%	Eliminated
Episode 25 (August 20)	Bamboo Manalac	3	Xylein Herrera	"Love Yourself"	17.80%	Eliminated
Episode 26 (August 21)	Lea Salonga					
Episode 26 (August 21)	Lea Salonga	1	Angel Peñaflor	"Only Hope"	10.14%	Eliminated
Episode 26 (August 21)	Lea Salonga	2	Yessha dela Calzada	"A Moment Like This"	33.71%	Eliminated
Episode 26 (August 21)	Lea Salonga	3	Joshua Oliveros	"Mama"	56.15%	Advanced

==== Week 2: Finals (August 27 & 28) ====
Prior to the announcement of the grand winner, Kathryn Bernardo and Daniel Padilla came to the stage and sang Nothing's Gonna Stop Us Now, and promoted their upcoming film, Barcelona: A Love Untold.

After being announced as the grand champion, Joshua Oliveros sang Salamat by Yeng Constantino.

Color key

Artist was proclaimed as the winner
Artist ended as the runner-up
Artist ended as the third placer

Coach	Artist	August 27				August 28		Votes	Result
Coach	Artist	Order	Duet song	Order	Upbeat song	Order	Power ballad song	Votes	Result
Bamboo Mañalac	Justin Alva	1	"Stitches"	2	"The Monster"/"Lose Yourself"	3	"How Will I Know"	25.24%	Third place
Lea Salonga	Joshua Oliveros	2	"Nais Ko"	3	"Mangarap Ka"	1	"Salamat"	38.07%	Winner
Sharon Cuneta	Antonetthe Tismo	3	"Batang Bata Ka Pa"	1	"Let's Get Loud"	2	"Pangako"	36.69%	Runner-up

== Reception ==
=== Television ratings ===
Television ratings for the third season of The Voice Kids on ABS-CBN were gathered from two major sources, namely from AGB Nielsen and Kantar Media. AGB Nielsen's survey ratings were gathered from Mega Manila households; it is worth noting that since July 2016, AGB Nielsen expanded their coverage to include urban Luzon. On the other hand, Kantar Media's survey ratings were gathered from urban and rural households all over the Philippines.

Episode		Original airdate	Timeslot (PST)	AGB Nielsen			Kantar Media			Source
Episode		Original airdate	Timeslot (PST)	Rating	Timeslot	Primetime	Rating	Timeslot	Primetime	Source
1	"The Blind auditions premiere"	May 28, 2016	Saturday 7:15 p.m.	18.8%	#2	#5	35.6%	#1	#1	
2	"The Blind auditions – part 2"	May 29, 2016	Sunday 7:00 p.m.	19.2%	#1	#2	36.6%	#1	#1	
3	"The Blind auditions – part 3"	June 4, 2016	Saturday 7:15 p.m.	18.8%	#2	#5	34.7%	#1	#1	
4	"The Blind auditions – part 4"	June 5, 2016	Sunday 7:00 p.m.	20.1%	#2	#2	36.4%	#1	#1	
5	"The Blind auditions – part 5"	June 11, 2016	Saturday 7:15 p.m.	21.6%	#2	#3	38.7%	#1	#1	
6	"The Blind auditions – part 6"	June 12, 2016	Sunday 7:00 p.m.	22.2%	#1	#2	39.7%	#1	#1	
7	"The Blind auditions – part 7"	June 18, 2016	Saturday 7:15 p.m.	18.6%	#2	#5	35.0%	#1	#2	
8	"The Blind auditions – part 8"	June 19, 2016	Sunday 7:00 p.m.	21.1%	#1	#2	35.8%	#1	#1	
9	"The Blind auditions – part 9"	June 25, 2016	Saturday 7:15 p.m.	19.0%	#2	#4	35.2%	#1	#1	
10	"The Blind auditions – part 10"	June 26, 2016	Sunday 7:00 p.m.	21.1%	#1	#4	38.7%	#1	#1	
11	"The Blind auditions – part 11"	July 2, 2016	Saturday 7:15 p.m.	21.6%	#1	#2	35.2%	#1	#1	
12	"The Blind auditions – part 12"	July 3, 2016	Sunday 7:00 p.m.	24.0%	#1	#1	37.0%	#1	#1	
13	"The Blind auditions – part 13"	July 9, 2016	Saturday 7:15 p.m.	23.9%	#2	#3	40.1%	#1	#1	
14	"The Blind auditions – part 14"	July 10, 2016	Sunday 7:00 p.m.	23.6%	#1	#1	37.8%	#1	#1	
15	"The Blind auditions – part 15"	July 16, 2016	Saturday 7:15 p.m.	20.8%	#2	#3	34.25%	#1	#1	
16	"The Battles premiere"	July 17, 2016	Sunday 7:00 p.m.	21.3%	#1	#2	36%	#1	#2	
17	"The Battles – part 2"	July 23, 2016	Saturday 7:15 p.m.	22.4%	#1	#1	36.3%	#1	#1	
18	"The Battles – part 3"	July 24, 2016	Sunday 7:00 p.m.	21.1%	#1	#1	36.7%	#1	#1	
19	"The Battles – part 4"	July 30, 2016	Saturday 7:15 p.m.	21.1%	#2	#2	37.4%	#1	#1	
20	"The Battles – part 5"	July 31, 2016	Sunday 7:00 p.m.	23.3%	#1	#2	38.4%	#1	#1	
21	"The Battles – part 6"	August 6, 2016	Saturday 7:15 p.m.	22.2%	#2	#2	37.0%	#1	#1	
22	"Sing Offs - Team Lea"	August 7, 2016	Sunday 7:00 p.m.	22.6%	#1	#2	38.20%	#1	#1	
23	"Sing Offs - Team Sharon"	August 13, 2016	Saturday 7:15 p.m.	23.9%	#1	#2	39.6%	#1	#1	
24	"Sing Offs - Team Bamboo"	August 14, 2016	Sunday 7:00 p.m.	24.6%	#1	#1	38.6%	#1	#1	
25	"Semifinals 1"	August 20, 2016	Saturday 7:15 p.m.	24.0%	#2	#3	38.8%	#1	#1	
26	"Semifinals 2"	August 21, 2016	Sunday 7:00 p.m.	23.9%	#1	#1	39.7%	#1	#1	
27	"Live Finals 1"	August 27, 2016	Saturday 7:15 p.m.	23.8%	#1	#2	39.0%	#1	#1	
28	"Live Finals 2"	August 28, 2016	Sunday 7:00 p.m.	25.5%	#1	#1	43.3%	#1	#1	
