= The Voice Kids (Philippine TV series) season 2 =

The Voice Kids
- Season 2
- Hosted by: Luis Manzano
- Coaches: Lea Salonga; Bamboo Mañalac; Sarah Geronimo
- Winner: Elha Nympha
- Winning coach: Bamboo Mañalac
- Runner-up: Reynan Dal-Anay

Release
- Original network: ABS-CBN
- Original release: June 6 – August 30, 2015

Season chronology
- ← Previous; Season 1 Next → Season 3

The second season of The Voice Kids aired on ABS-CBN from June 6 to August 30, 2015, replacing the first season of Your Face Sounds Familiar, though it premiered on the same weekend as the aforementioned show's finale, and was replaced by the second season of Your Face Sound Familiar. Lea Salonga, Bamboo Mañalac and Sarah Geronimo returned to the show as coaches. Luis Manzano also returned as host, accompanied by Robi Domingo and Yeng Constantino as the show's backstage and media hosts.

Elha Mae Nympha of Kamp Kawayan was named as the season's winner at the season finale aired on August 30, 2015. Her victory marks Bamboo Mañalac's first win as a coach.

== Developments ==
After the finale of the second season of The Voice of the Philippines, it was announced that The Voice Kids will have a second season. This was also confirmed by Salonga.

Aster Amoyo in Pilipino Star Ngayon wrote that the show will end on August 30, 2015—though there wasn't any definite premiere date for the show. In May 2015, the show was revealed to air on June 6, 2015, replacing the timeslot of the first season of Your Face Sounds Familiar. Coincidentally, the aforementioned show's Grand Showdown was aired on the same weekend as the premiere of The Voice Kids' second season.

=== Coaches and hosts ===
The coaches of the second season of The Voice Kids

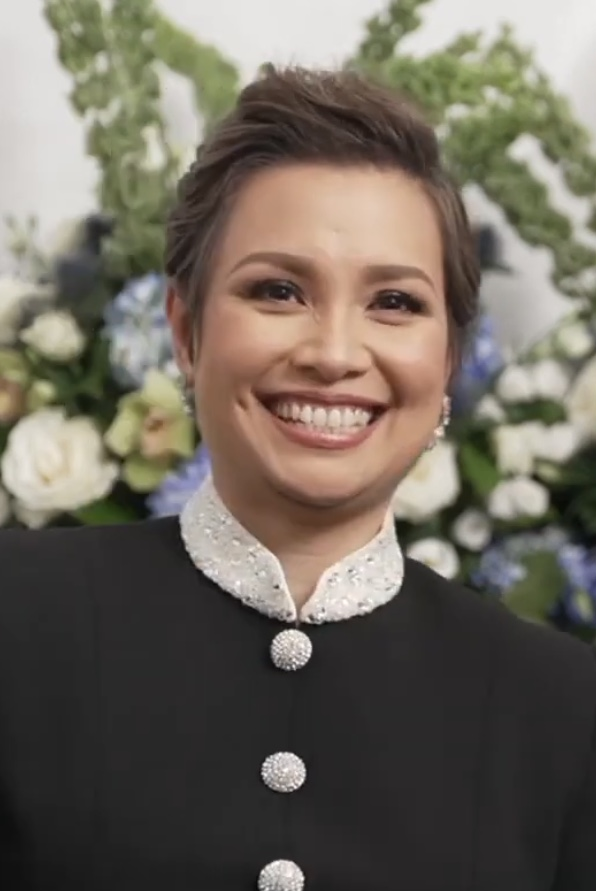
Lea Salonga

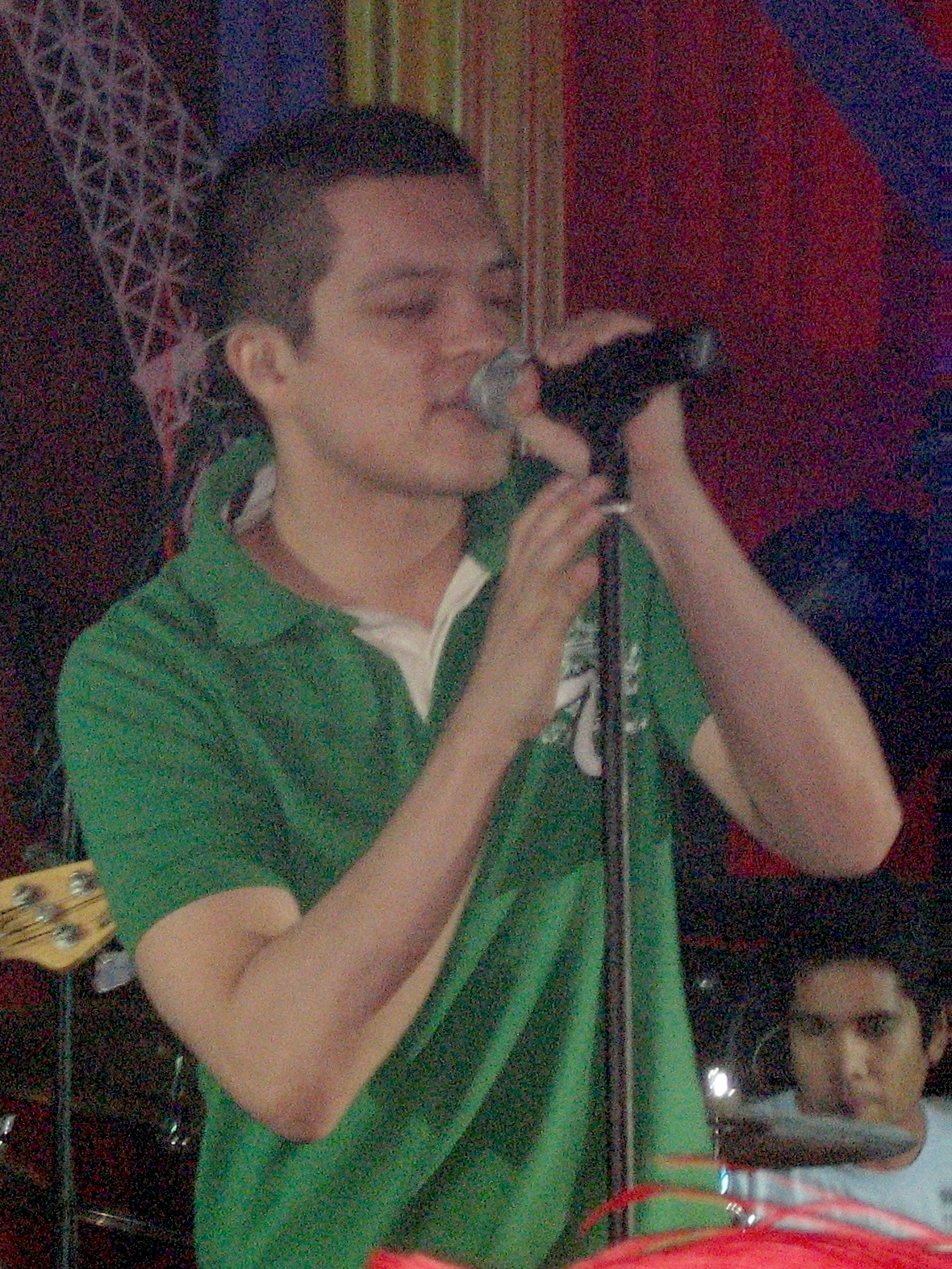
Bamboo Mañalac

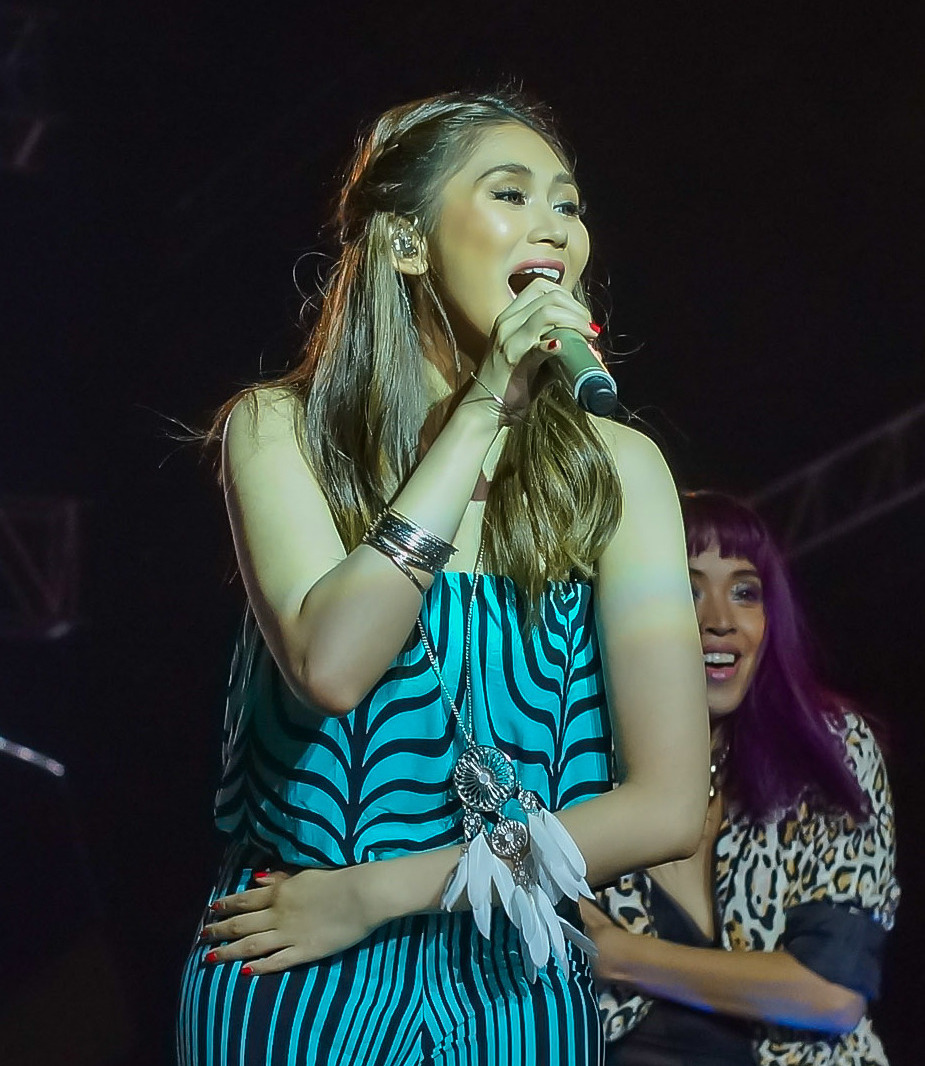
Sarah Geronimo

Lea Salonga confirmed on Twitter and in Aquino & Abunda Tonight that she will be returning for the second season; Bamboo Mañalac and Sarah Geronimo were also confirmed to return to the show. Luis Manzano also returned as host. Alex Gonzaga did not return as host and instead was replaced by Robi Domingo and Yeng Constantino.

=== Auditions ===
Cities in the Philippines where the auditions for the second season of The Voice Kids were held.

The age limit for this season was reduced to 7–13 years old; in the previous season, it was 8–14 years old. The auditions were announced after the finale of the second season of The Voice of the Philippines:

On-ground auditions of The Voice Kids
Date	Venue	City	Ref.
March 7, 2015	Araneta Coliseum	Quezon City, Metro Manila	
March 15, 2015	Starmall Alabang	Muntinlupa, Metro Manila	
March 15, 2015	Starmall San Jose Del Monte	San Jose del Monte, Bulacan	
March 21, 2015	Starmall EDSA-Shaw	Mandaluyong, Metro Manila	
March 21, 2015	Pacific Mall Lucena	Lucena, Quezon	
March 21, 2015	Island City Mall	Tagbilaran, Bohol	
March 25, 2015	Starmall Las Piñas	Las Piñas, Metro Manila	
March 29, 2015	Robinsons Place Santiago	Santiago, Isabela	
March 29, 2015	Robinsons Place Bacolod	Bacolod, Negros Occidental	
March 29, 2015	Starmall Prima Taguig	Taguig, Metro Manila	
April 9, 2015	Starmall Talisay	Talisay, Cebu	
April 9, 2015	The Peak, Gaisano Mall of Davao	Davao City, Davao	
April 9, 2015	KCC Mall of GenSan	General Santos	
April 9, 2015	Robinsons Place Butuan	Butuan, Agusan del Norte	
April 9, 2015	The Atrium, Limketkai Mall	Cagayan de Oro	
April 17, 2015	KCC Mall of GenSan	General Santos	
April 25, 2015	Abreeza	Davao City, Davao	

== Teams ==
Color key

- Winner
- Runner-up
- Third place
- Fourth place
- Semi-finalist
- Eliminated in the Sing-offs
- Eliminated in the Battles

Coaches	Top 54 artists					
Lea Salonga						
Lea Salonga	Reynan Dal-Anay	Esang de Torres	Jhyleanne Rington	Luke Alford	Akisha Sianson	Jonalyn Pepito
Lea Salonga	Angel Enerio	Rovelyn Marquesa	Stephanie Jordan	Bianca Marbella	Jiah Austria	Kiyana Bongat
Lea Salonga	Mary Anne Ramos	Kyla Jose	Noah Anderson	Jhoas Sumatra	Joemar Lazarraga	Aihna Imperial
Bamboo Mañalac						
Bamboo Mañalac	Elha Nympha	Sassa Dagdag	Benedict Inciong	Martina Ortiz-Luis	Narcylyn Esguerra	Altair Aguelo
Bamboo Mañalac	Lance Kharl Macalinao	Crissel Ignacio	Nikki Apolinar	Alexis Prieto	Emman & Sandy Tanio	Romeo Espino
Bamboo Mañalac	Kate Campo	Paul Abellana	Ashley Alcayde	Ataska Mercado	Christian Pasno	Sim Teves
Sarah Geronimo						
Sarah Geronimo	Zephanie Dimaranan	Kyle Echarri	Kristel Belo	Francis Ryan Lim	Amira Medina	Gian Ale
Sarah Geronimo	Alexia Dator	Jolianne Salvado	Krystle Campos	Rock Opong	Owen Gonzaga	Andrew Patuasic
Sarah Geronimo	Joshua Torino	Ken Jhon Mebrano	Kenshley Abad	Mandy Sevillana	Gift Cerna	Therese Celo

== Blind auditions ==
The filming for the Blind auditions started on April 25, 2015.

It aired from June 6 to July 19 for 14 episodes with a total of 79 aspiring contestants.

Color key

✔	Coach hit his/her "I WANT YOU" button
	Artist defaulted to this coach's team
	Artist chose to join this coach's team
	Artist eliminated with no coach pressing his or her "I WANT YOU" button

=== Episode 1 (June 6) ===
The first episode was graced by an opening number from the coaches wherein they sang "Start of Something New" from the High School Musical and "ABC" from the Jackson 5.

This episode aired at an earlier timeslot of 6:45 PM due to the first part of the Grand Showdown of the first season of Your Face Sounds Familiar, pre-empting Mga Kwento ni Marc Logan.

Order	Artist	Age	Hometown	Song	Coach's and contestant's choices		
Order	Artist	Age	Hometown	Song	Lea	Bamboo	Sarah
1	Kyle Echarri	11	Cebu City	"Night Changes"	–	✔	✔
2	Romeo Espino	9	Tondo, Manila	"Hesus"	–	✔	✔
3	Bianca Marbella	8	Batangas City	"Do You Want to Build a Snowman?"	✔	✔	✔
4	Reynan Dal-Anay	11	San Fernando, Bukidnon	"Tagumpay Nating Lahat"	✔	✔	✔

=== Episode 2 (June 7) ===
Order	Artist	Age	Hometown	Song	Coach's and contestant's choices		
Order	Artist	Age	Hometown	Song	Lea	Bamboo	Sarah
1	Ataska Mercado	13	Novaliches, Quezon City	"Rather Be"	✔	✔	✔
2	Francesca Rojas	8	Cebu	"Wings"	–	–	–
3	Zephanie Dimaranan	12	Biñan, Laguna	"Till I Met You"	–	✔	✔
4	Gian Ale	9	Tagbilaran City, Bohol	"Thinking Out Loud"	✔	✔	✔

=== Episode 3 (June 13) ===
Order	Artist	Age	Hometown	Song	Coach's and contestant's choices		
Order	Artist	Age	Hometown	Song	Lea	Bamboo	Sarah
1	Stephanie Jordan	9	Cebu City	"Skyscraper"	✔	–	–
2	RJ	N/A	N/A	"May Bukas Pa"	–	–	–
3	James	N/A	N/A	"Dance with My Father"	–	–	–
4	Francis Lim	12	Caloocan	"I'll Be There"	✔	✔	✔
5	Precious Galvez	8	Cubao, Quezon City	"Better Days"	–	–	–
6	Altair Aguelo	11	San Diego, California, United States	"Stay with Me"	✔	✔	✔
7	Krystle Campos	10	Calamba, Laguna	"Nais Ko"	✔	–	✔

=== Episode 4 (June 14) ===
Order	Artist	Age	Hometown	Song	Coach's and contestant's choices		
Order	Artist	Age	Hometown	Song	Lea	Bamboo	Sarah
1	John Basty Peguerra	9	Pagbilao, Quezon	"Ang Buhay Ko"	–	–	–
2	Therese Celo	11	Bacolod	"Hanggang"	✔	✔	✔
3	Christian Pasno	10	San Juan, Batangas	"Ika'y Mahal Pa Rin"	✔	✔	–
4	Jyrus Bulatao	11	Nueva Vizcaya	"Lipad"	–	–	–
5	Alexia Dator	9	Lucena City	"Blank Space"	–	–	✔
6	Ken Jhon Mebrano	11	Davao City	"I Don't Wanna Miss A Thing"	–	–	✔
7	Lance Kharl Macalinao	7	Carmona, Cavite	"What Makes You Beautiful"	–	✔	–

=== Episode 5 (June 20) ===
Order	Artist	Age	Hometown	Song	Coach's and contestant's choices		
Order	Artist	Age	Hometown	Song	Lea	Bamboo	Sarah
1	Noah Anderson	11	Zambales	"Just Give Me a Reason"	✔	✔	✔
2	Martina Ortiz-Luis	12	Toronto, Canada	"Girl on Fire"	–	✔	–
3	Jan Ge Moraca	11	Cebu City	"Paano"	–	–	–
4	Esang de Torres	8	Tondo, Manila	"Home"	✔	✔	✔

=== Episode 6 (June 21) ===
Order	Artist	Age	Hometown	Song	Coach's and contestant's choices		
Order	Artist	Age	Hometown	Song	Lea	Bamboo	Sarah
1	Benedict Inciong	11	Lipa City	"If I Sing You A Love Song"	✔	✔	–
2	Anika Faith Cara	11	Muñoz, Nueva Ecija	"Kilometro"	–	–	–
3	Kenshley Abad	7	Isabela	"Dance With My Father"	–	–	✔
4	Mariele Ponte	11	Pasig	"Roar"	–	–	–
5	Joemar Lazarraga	7	Cebu	"Sa Mata Makikita"	✔	✔	✔

=== Episode 7 (June 27) ===
Order	Artist	Age	Hometown	Song	Coach's and contestant's choices		
Order	Artist	Age	Hometown	Song	Lea	Bamboo	Sarah
1	Kiyana Bongat	11	Cavite	"Grenade"	✔	✔	–
2	Keith Bryan Sugnot	11	San Fernando, Bukidnon	"Open Arms"	–	–	–
3	Nikki Apolinar	12	Cebu City	"Secrets"	–	✔	–
4	Caryl Brianne Codina	12	Mandaue City, Cebu	"Shake It Off"	–	–	–
5	Luke Alford	10	Batangas City, Batangas	"Hey, Soul Sister"	✔	✔	✔
6	Mandy Sevillana	9	Makati	"Hesus"	–	–	✔

=== Episode 8 (June 28) ===
Order	Artist	Age	Hometown	Song	Coach's and contestant's choices		
Order	Artist	Age	Hometown	Song	Lea	Bamboo	Sarah
1	Dustin Gipala	10	Quezon City	"Simpleng Tulad Mo"	–	–	–
2	Jolianne Salvado	11	Cebu City	"Tattooed Heart"	✔	–	✔
3	Kezia Quizon	11	Canlaon	"Kailan"	–	–	–
4	Sim Teves	12	Dumaguete	"Stay with Me"	✔	✔	✔
5	Emman & Sandy Tanio	12 & 10	Bohol	"Just Give Me a Reason"^{1}	–	✔	–

Note

1. Emman & Sandy Tanio sang the Visayan version of "Just Give Me a Reason."

=== Episode 9 (July 4) ===
Order	Artist	Age	Hometown	Song	Coach's and contestant's choices		
Order	Artist	Age	Hometown	Song	Lea	Bamboo	Sarah
1	Alexis Prieto	13	Cebu	"Balay ni Mayang"	✔	✔	–
2	Angel Enerio	10	Iligan City	"Bulong"	✔	–	–
3	Julia Mandin	10	Loboc, Bohol	"Isang Lahi"	–	–	–
4	Andrew Patuasic	13	Cagayan de Oro	"Give Me Love"	✔	✔	✔
5	Jaffnah Garcia	13	Santa Cruz, Laguna	"Stay"	–	–	–
6	Gift Cerna	10	Butuan	"Malayo Pa Ang Umaga"	–	✔	✔

=== Episode 10 (July 5) ===
Order	Artist	Age	Hometown	Song	Coach's and contestant's choices		
Order	Artist	Age	Hometown	Song	Lea	Bamboo	Sarah
1	Jiah Austria	12	Laguna	"Ang Buhay Ko"	✔	✔	✔
2	Cassandra Alexa Cusimano	8	Bacolod	"Blank Space"	–	–	–
3	Alain Diego Arroyo	13	Occidental Mindoro	"Treasure"	–	–	–
4	Rovelyn Marquesa	12	Davao del Norte	"Empire State of Mind"	✔	–	✔
5	Kate Campo	8	Cardona, Rizal	"Hanggang Kailan Kita Mamahalin"	–	✔	–
6	Jhoas Sumatra	12	Taguig	"Help"	✔	✔	–

=== Episode 11 (July 11) ===
Order	Artist	Age	Hometown	Song	Coach's and contestant's choices		
Order	Artist	Age	Hometown	Song	Lea	Bamboo	Sarah
1	Joshua Turino	10	Calapan, Oriental Mindoro	"Lipad ng Pangarap"	✔	✔	✔
2	Kyla Jose	13	Marikina	"Tunay na Mahal"	✔	✔	–
3	Niña Faith delos Reyes	10	Malita, Davao del Sur	"Narda"	–	–	–
4	Jonalyn Pepito	11	Cebu	"Because of You"	✔	–	–
5	John Gabriel Valenzona	8	Muntinlupa	"All of Me"	–	–	–
6	Amira Medina	12	Naic, Cavite	"Wrecking Ball"	✔	✔	✔

=== Episode 12 (July 12) ===
Order	Artist	Age	Hometown	Song	Coach's and contestant's choices		
Order	Artist	Age	Hometown	Song	Lea	Bamboo	Sarah
1	Sassa Dagdag	12	Angeles City	"Chandelier"	✔	✔	✔
2	Aihna Imperial	9	Sorsogon	"Stand Up for Love"	✔	–	–
3	Ashley Alcayde	11	Quezon City	"Sunday Morning"	–	✔	–
4	Marc Enriquez	11	Davao City	"Maghintay Ka Lamang"	–	–	–
5	Kristel Belo	8	Santo Tomas, Batangas	"Bituing Walang Ningning"	–	–	✔
6	Rock Opong	8	Iloilo City	"No Good in Goodbye"	✔	✔	✔

=== Episode 13 (July 18) ===
Order	Artist	Age	Hometown	Song	Coach's and contestant's choices		
Order	Artist	Age	Hometown	Song	Lea	Bamboo	Sarah
1	Mary Anne Ramos	10	Albay	"Diamonds Are Forever"	✔	✔	✔
2	Joshua Clemente	10	Taytay, Rizal	"Ikaw ang Pangarap"	–	–	–
3	Paul Abellana	11	Cebu	"Marry You"	–	✔	–
4	Norelle Mutya Fernandez	12	Guimaras	"That's the Way It Is"	–	–	–
5	Jhyleanne Rington	11	Marilao, Bulacan	"On My Own"	✔	✔	✔
6	Narcylyn Esguerra	9	San Pablo, Laguna	"Natatawa Ako"	–	✔	–

=== Episode 14 (July 19) ===
Order	Artist	Age	Hometown	Song	Coach's and contestant's choices		
Order	Artist	Age	Hometown	Song	Lea	Bamboo	Sarah
1	Owen Gonzaga	13	Dinagat Islands	"Amazing"	✔	–	✔
2	Ashley Manansala	10	Parañaque	"I Turn to You"	–	–	Team full
3	Crissel Ignacio	9	Cainta, Rizal	"Pangarap na Bituin"	–	✔	Team full
4	Akisha Sianson	12	Cebu	"Lips Are Movin"	✔	✔	Team full
5	Jazmine	N/A	N/A	"Diamonds"	Team full	–	Team full
6	Angel	N/A	N/A	"Titanium"	Team full	–	Team full
7	Elha Nympha	11	Quezon City	"Vision of Love"	Team full	✔	Team full

== The Battles ==
54 artists advanced to the Battles. This part of the competition follows the format of the previous season wherein three artists pit for one of the six spots per team in the Sing-offs. The Battles first aired on July 25, 2015.

On its first episode, Yeng Constantino along with The Voice of the Philippines winners Mitoy Yonting and Jason Dy, and The Voice Kids first season winner Lyca Gairanod sang "Puso" by Sponge Cola and "Liwanag sa Dilim" by Rivermaya.

Color key

Artist won the battle and advance to the Sing-offs
Artist lost the battle and was eliminated

Episode	Coach	Order	Artists			Song	Ref.
Episode 15 (July 25)	Lea Salonga	1	Jonalyn Pepito	Aihna Imperial	Joemar Lazarraga	"Bawat Bata"	
Episode 15 (July 25)	Bamboo Mañalac	2	Sim Teves	Benedict Inciong	Christian Pasno	"Fireflies"	
Episode 15 (July 25)	Sarah Geronimo	3	Therese Celo	Gift Cerna	Francis Lim	"Pyramid"	
Episode 16 (July 26)	Lea Salonga	1	Jhoas Sumatra	Noah Anderson	Luke Alford	"I Want You Back"	
Episode 16 (July 26)	Bamboo Mañalac	2	Ataska Mercado	Martina Ortiz-Luis	Ashley Alcayde	"Birthday"	
Episode 16 (July 26)	Sarah Geronimo	3	Mandy Sevillana	Kristel Belo	Kenshley Abad	"Iduyan Mo"	
Episode 16 (July 26)	Bamboo Mañalac	4	Kate Campo	Paul Abellana	Elha Nympha	"Your Love"	
Episode 17 (August 1)	Sarah Geronimo	1	Ken Jhon Mebrano	Joshua Turino	Zephanie Dimaranan	"I Can"	
Episode 17 (August 1)	Lea Salonga	2	Mary Anne Ramos	Jhyleanne Rington	Kyla Jose	"For the First Time in Forever"	
Episode 17 (August 1)	Sarah Geronimo	3	Andrew Patuasic	Owen Gonzaga	Amira Medina	"Keep Holding On"	
Episode 17 (August 1)	Bamboo Mañalac	4	Romeo Espino	Altair Aguelo	Emman & Sandy Tanio	"Billionaire"	
Episode 18 (August 2)	Lea Salonga	1	Jiah Austria	Kiyana Bongat	Akisha Sianson	"Kapag Tumibok Ang Puso"	
Episode 18 (August 2)	Bamboo Mañalac	2	Sassa Dagdag	Nikki Apolinar	Alexis Prieto	"Hold On"	
Episode 18 (August 2)	Lea Salonga	3	Stephanie Jordan	Bianca Marbella	Esang de Torres	"Somewhere Out There"	
Episode 18 (August 2)	Sarah Geronimo	4	Gian Ale	Rock Opong	Krystle Campos	"Tuwing Umuulan at Kapiling Ka"	
Episode 19 (August 8)	Sarah Geronimo	1	Jolianne Salvado	Alexia Dator	Kyle Echarri	"True Colors"	
Episode 19 (August 8)	Lea Salonga	2	Angel Enorio	Rovelyn Marquesa	Reynan Dal-Anay	"Lupa"	
Episode 19 (August 8)	Bamboo Mañalac	3	Lance Kharl Macalinao	Crissel Ignacio	Narcylyn Esguerra	"Di Bale Na Lang"	

== The Sing-offs ==
18 artists advanced to the Sing-offs. This part of the competition follows the format of the previous season wherein six artists performed for their coach's two spots for the Live shows. The Sing-offs first aired on August 9, 2015.

Color key

Artist was chosen by his/her coach to advance to the semifinals	Artist was eliminated

Episode	Coach	Order	Artist	Song	Result
Episode 20 (August 9)	Lea Salonga				
Episode 20 (August 9)	Lea Salonga	1	Jonalyn Pepito	"I Believe"	Eliminated
Episode 20 (August 9)	Lea Salonga	2	Akisha Sianson	"Invisible"	Eliminated
Episode 20 (August 9)	Lea Salonga	3	Esang de Torres	"Isang Mundo, Isang Awit"	Advanced
Episode 20 (August 9)	Lea Salonga	4	Luke Alford	"Skyfall"	Eliminated
Episode 20 (August 9)	Lea Salonga	5	Jhyleanne Rington	"What the World Needs Now"	Eliminated
Episode 20 (August 9)	Lea Salonga	6	Reynan Dal-Anay	"Amazing Grace"	Advanced
Episode 21 (August 15)	Bamboo Mañalac				
Episode 21 (August 15)	Bamboo Mañalac	1	Altair Aguelo	"When I Was Your Man"	Eliminated
Episode 21 (August 15)	Bamboo Mañalac	2	Narcylyn Esguerra	"Set Fire to the Rain"	Eliminated
Episode 21 (August 15)	Bamboo Mañalac	3	Martina Ortiz-Luis	"Valerie"	Eliminated
Episode 21 (August 15)	Bamboo Mañalac	4	Benedict Inciong	"The Man Who Can't Be Moved"	Eliminated
Episode 21 (August 15)	Bamboo Mañalac	5	Sassa Dagdag	"The Show"	Advanced
Episode 21 (August 15)	Bamboo Mañalac	6	Elha Nympha	"Natutulog Ba ang Diyos?"	Advanced
Episode 22 (August 16)	Sarah Geronimo				
Episode 22 (August 16)	Sarah Geronimo	1	Gian Ale	"Oh Cecilia"	Eliminated
Episode 22 (August 16)	Sarah Geronimo	2	Amira Medina	"Faithfully"	Eliminated
Episode 22 (August 16)	Sarah Geronimo	3	Francis Lim	"When You Believe"	Eliminated
Episode 22 (August 16)	Sarah Geronimo	4	Zephanie Dimaranan	"Problem"	Advanced
Episode 22 (August 16)	Sarah Geronimo	5	Kristel Belo	"Sa Ugoy ng Duyan"	Eliminated
Episode 22 (August 16)	Sarah Geronimo	6	Kyle Echarri	"Just the Way You Are"	Advanced

== Live shows ==
=== Results summary ===
Color key
Artist's info

- Artist from Team Lea
- Artist from Team Bamboo
- Artist from Team Sarah

Result details

- Artist was saved after receiving the highest public votes
- Artist was eliminated
- Artist was proclaimed as the winner
- Artist was proclaimed as runner-up, third and fourth placers

Live show results per week
Artist	Week 1	Week 2
Elha Nympha	Safe	Winner
Reynan Dal-Anay	Safe	Runner-up
Esang de Torres	Safe	Third place
Sassa Dagdag	Safe	Fourth place
Zephanie Dimaranan	Eliminated	Eliminated (Week 1)
Kyle Echarri	Eliminated	Eliminated (Week 1)
References		

=== Live show details ===
The Live shows were held in Newport Performing Arts Theater, Resorts World Manila, Newport City, Pasay from August 22, 2015 to August 30, 2015.

This season followed the format from the previous season wherein the outcome of the Live shows will solely be from the results of the public's votes. Voting lines were opened every Saturdays after all the performances of the artists, and ended on Sundays. In the semifinals, the top four artists coming from the results of the public votes advanced to the Finals. The public was only allowed to vote once per mobile number per weekend night.

Color key

Artist was saved by the public's vote
Artist was eliminated

==== Week 1: Semifinals (August 22 & 23) ====
With the elimination of Kyle Echarri and Zephanie Dimaranan, Sarah Geronimo no longer has any artists remaining on her team, which for the first time in the show's history, a coach's team doesn't have any artists left for the finale.

Coach	Artist	August 22		August 23		Votes	Result
Coach	Artist	Order	Solo song	Order	Three-way ala Battle song	Votes	Result
Lea Salonga	Reynan Dal-Anay	2	"Itanong Mo Sa Mga Bata"	1	"Saranggola ni Pepe"/"Ang Pipit"	32.98%	Safe
Bamboo Mañalac	Sassa Dagdag	3	"If I Were a Boy"	1	"Saranggola ni Pepe"/"Ang Pipit"	13.71%	Safe
Sarah Geronimo	Kyle Echarri	5	"Got To Believe In Magic"	1	"Saranggola ni Pepe"/"Ang Pipit"	6.43%	Eliminated
Sarah Geronimo	Zephanie Dimaranan	1	"Flashlight"	2	"Fame"/"What a Feeling"	9.40%	Eliminated
Lea Salonga	Esang de Torres	4	"Salamat, Salamat Musika"	2	"Fame"/"What a Feeling"	19.24%	Safe
Bamboo Mañalac	Elha Nympha	6	"You'll Never Walk Alone"	2	"Fame"/"What a Feeling"	18.23%	Safe

Non-competition performances
Order	Performer	Song
25.1	The Voice Coaches and Top 6 Artists	Sampaguita medley "Bonggahan", "Sayawan", and "Nosi Balasi"
26.1	Lyca Gairanod	Aegis medley "Halik", "Luha", and "Basang-Basa sa Ulan".

==== Week 2: The Finale (August 29 & 30) ====
Color key

Artist was proclaimed as the winner
Artist ended as the runner-up
Artist ended as the third placer
Artist ended as the fourth placer

Coach	Artist	August 29					August 30		Votes	Result
Coach	Artist	Order	Duet song	with	Order	Upbeat song	Order	Power ballad song	Votes	Result
Bamboo Mañalac	Elha Nympha	2	"Narito"	Jed Madela	4	"Emotions"	3	"Ikaw ang Lahat sa Akin"	42.16%	Winner
Lea Salonga	Reynan Dal-Anay	1	"Babalik Ka Rin"	Gary Valenciano	3	"Toyang"	2	"Magkaisa"	31.64%	Runner-up
Lea Salonga	Esang de Torres	3	"Count On Me"	Billy Crawford	1	"Dancing Queen"	4	"Somewhere"	18.16%	Third place
Bamboo Mañalac	Sassa Dagdag	4	"Ikaw"	Sharon Cuneta	2	"Starships"	1	"Next in Line"	8.04%	Fourth place

Non-competition performances
Order	Performer	Song
27.1	Top 4 Artists	"Forever Young" / "Verge"
28.1	Top 4 Artists	"Larger than Life" / "Spice Up Your Life" / "Cup of Life"
28.2	The Voice Coaches	"Sariling Awit Natin"
28.3	Elha Nympha (winner)	"Ikaw ang Lahat sa Akin"

== Post-season concert special ==
The post-season concert special, Boses ng Bulilit, Muling Bibirit, aired on September 5 and 6, 2015.

== Reception ==
=== Television ratings ===
Television ratings for the second season of The Voice of the Philippines on ABS-CBN were gathered from two major sources, namely from AGB Nielsen and Kantar Media. AGB Nielsen's survey ratings were gathered from Mega Manila households, while Kantar Media's survey ratings were gathered from urban and rural households all over the Philippines.

Episode		Original airdate	Timeslot (PST)	AGB Nielsen			Kantar Media			Source
Episode		Original airdate	Timeslot (PST)	Rating	Timeslot	Primetime	Rating	Timeslot	Primetime	Source
1	"The Blind auditions premiere"	June 6, 2015	Saturday 6:45 p.m.	20.7%	#1	#4	35.4%	#1	#3	
2	"The Blind auditions – part 2"	June 7, 2015	Sunday 7:00 p.m.	19.5%	#1	#4	36.2%	#1	#2	
3	"The Blind auditions – part 3"	June 13, 2015	Saturday 7:15 p.m.	23.4%	#2	#2	40.7%	#1	#1	
4	"The Blind auditions – part 4"	June 14, 2015	Sunday 7:45 p.m.	26.0%	#1	#1	39.9%	#1	#1	
5	"The Blind auditions – part 5"	June 20, 2015	Saturday 7:15 p.m.	24.1%	#2	#2	39.9%	#1	#1	
6	"The Blind auditions – part 6"	June 21, 2015	Sunday 7:45 p.m.	28.3%	#1	#1	40.4%	#1	#1	
7	"The Blind auditions – part 7"	June 27, 2015	Saturday 7:15 p.m.	23.2%	#2	#2	39.6%	#1	#1	
8	"The Blind auditions – part 8"	June 28, 2015	Sunday 7:45 p.m.	26.2%	#1	#1	42.5%	#1	#1	
9	"The Blind auditions – part 9"	July 4, 2015	Saturday 7:15 p.m.	24.6%	#2	#2	42.3%	#1	#1	
10	"The Blind auditions – part 10"	July 5, 2015	Sunday 7:45 p.m.	28.2%	#1	#1	42.5%	#1	#1	
11	"The Blind auditions – part 11"	July 11, 2015	Saturday 7:15 p.m.	26.4%	#1	#1	42.4%	#1	#1	
12	"The Blind auditions – part 12"	July 12, 2015	Sunday 7:45 p.m.	28.5%	#1	#1	45.2%	#1	#1	
13	"The Blind auditions – part 13"	July 18, 2015	Saturday 7:15 p.m.	26.5%	#1	#1	42.0%	#1	#1	
14	"The Blind auditions – part 14"	July 19, 2015	Sunday 7:45 p.m.	28.0%	#1	#1	45.1%	#1	#1	
15	"The Battles premiere"	July 25, 2015	Saturday 7:15 p.m.	27.6%	#1	#1	45.1%	#1	#1	
16	"The Battles – part 2"	July 26, 2015	Sunday 7:45 p.m.	28.1%	#1	#1	46.3%	#1	#1	
17	"The Battles – part 3"	August 1, 2015	Saturday 7:15 p.m.	26.4%	#1	#1	41.0%	#1	#1	
18	"The Battles – part 4"	August 2, 2015	Sunday 7:45 p.m.	27.3%	#1	#1	42.4%	#1	#1	
19	"The Battles – part 5"	August 8, 2015	Saturday 7:15 p.m.	24.9%	#2	#2	41.7%	#1	#1	
20	"The Sing-offs premiere"	August 9, 2015	Sunday 7:45 p.m.	27.4%	#2	#2	44.1%	#1	#1	
21	"The Sing-offs – part 2"	August 15, 2015	Saturday 7:15 p.m.	26.0%	#1	#1	40.5%	#1	#1	
22	"The Sing-offs – part 3"	August 16, 2015	Sunday 7:45 p.m.	26.4%	#2	#2	41.0%	#1	#1	
23	"The Live Semifinals premiere"	August 22, 2015	Saturday 7:15 p.m.	27.2%	#1	#1	39.5%	#1	#1	
24	"The Live Semifinals – part 2"	August 23, 2015	Sunday 7:45 p.m.	28.6%	#1	#1	44.3%	#1	#1	
25	"The Live Grandfinals – part 1"	August 29, 2015	Saturday 7:15 p.m.	26.0%	#2	#2	38.8%	#1	#1	
26	"The Live Grandfinals – part 2"	August 30, 2015	Sunday 7:45 p.m.	27.2%	#1	#1	43.4%	#1	#1	
Season average				26.03%	#1	#2	41.62%	#1	#1	
