= Elha Nympha =

Filipino singer (born 2004)

- Born: Elha Mae Nympha; April 16, 2004 (age 22); Parañaque, Metro Manila, Philippines
- Genres: OPM; pop
- Occupations: Singer, performer
- Instrument: Vocals
- Years active: 2015–present
- Label: UMG Philippines (EMI)

Elha Mae Fronda Nympha (born April 16, 2004) is a Filipino singer who won the second season of The Voice Kids in 2015. She started singing at the age of 3 and started joining a school competition at the age of 7, where she won a Rotary Club competition on Amaranth on February 18, 2014. At the age of 9, she auditioned for the first season of The Voice Kids but did not make it. In 2015, she auditioned for the second season, which she won.

Nympha won a recording contract with MCA Music Inc. (Philippines), a Universal Music Group company in 2015, with her self-titled studio album, Elha, released on October 7, 2016, with the carrier singles "Susunduin", "Emotions", and "Love on Top".

Nympha was a member of the all-female vocal group New Gen Divas together with Janine Berdin, Sheena Belarmino and Fana.

== Early life ==
She lived in Kamuning, Quezon City, and sold banana cue to support herself and her family. Her mother Lucy noticed her talent for singing.

== Career ==
=== 2015: The Voice Kids ===
On the blind auditions, she performed Mariah Carey's "Vision of Love". Coach Bamboo Mañalac pressed the button for her. She advanced to the sing-off round by winning the battles against Kate Campo and Paul Abellana. They sang "Your Love" by Alamid. She was picked until the live shows, and she was called second for the Top 4 together with Reynan del-anay, Esang de Torres and Sassa Dagdag. On her performance in the finale, Nympha received 42.16% of the votes, and won the season, giving Mañalac his first victory on the show.

==== Performances ====
Stage	Song	Original artist	Date	Order	Result
Blind Audition	"Vision of Love"	Mariah Carey	July 19, 2015	14.7	1 chair turned (Default to Team Bamboo Mañalac)
Battle Rounds	"Your Love" (vs. Kate Campo vs. Paul Abellana)	Alamid	July 26, 2015	16.4	Saved by Bamboo
Sing-offs	"Natutulog Ba Ang Diyos?"	Gary Valenciano	August 15, 2015	21.6	Saved by Bamboo
Live (Semifinals)	"You'll Never Walk Alone"	Rodgers and Hammerstein	August 22, 2015	23.6	Saved by Public Vote
Live (Semifinals)	"Fame"/"What a Feeling" (vs. Zephanie Dimaranan vs. Esang de Torres)	Irene Cara	July 19, 2015	14.7	Saved by Public Vote
Live (Finals)	"Narito" (with Jed Madela)	Gary Valenciano	August 29, 2015	27.1	Winner
Live (Finals)	"Emotions"	Mariah Carey	August 29, 2015	27.8	Winner
Live (Finals)	"Ikaw Ang Lahat Sa Akin"	Martin Nievera	August 30, 2015	28.3	Winner

=== 2016–present: International appearances, Your Face Sounds Familiar: Kids, New Gen Divas ===
In 2016, she released her first album. In December 2016 she was a guest performer in the grand final of The Voice Kids Indonesia. Then in 2017, she took part in the first season of Your Face Sounds Familiar: Kids. Nympha appeared during the second season of Steve Harvey's Little Big Shots where she performed Sia's "Chandelier". She also participated at the French version of Little Big Shots named Little Big Stars presented by Cyril Hanouna where she covered the same song. In 2019, a girl group was formed called J.E.Z. where Nympha is a member of along with Janine Berdin and Zephanie. The group would take a hiatus in March 2020, but would reform in 2021 with the addition of Sheena Belarmino as a new member of the group and it would be rebranded to New Gen Divas. The reformed group debuted in April 2021, following Zephanie's return to ASAP, with Nympha representing the color blue in the said group.

In July 2022, Nympha was signed to UMG Philippines' newest label, Republic Records Philippines.

In August 2026, she, along with Esang de Torres, Lance Reblando, and Nar Cabico is announced as one of the artists participating in the Philippine Selection Night, the national selection for the Eurovision Song Contest Asia 2026, with the song "Chéri(e)", composed by Cabico.

Elha Nympha In Inday

Elha Nympha steps out on her comfort zone because she is going to take her first ever musical theater role in "Inday: The Musical." She was "The Former The Voice Kids Philippines" opens up about her initial nerves , the learning process and her hopes of becoming a theater actress.

== Discography ==
Year	Album title	Label	Ref
2015	The Voice Kids Season 2 The Album	MCA Music Inc. (Philippines)	
2016	Elha	MCA Music Inc. (Philippines)	

== Filmography ==
=== Television ===
Year	Show	Role	Ref
2015	The Voice Kids (Philippines season 2)	Contestant	
2017	Gandang Gabi Vice	Guest with YFSF Kids	
2017	Tonight with Boy Abunda	Guest	
2017	Your Face Sounds Familiar Kids (season 1)	Contestant	
2017	The Voice Teens	Guest performer	
2019	Gandang Gabi Vice	Guest with Janine and Zephanie	
2019–present	ASAP	Performer (member of New Gen DIVAS)	
2026	Your Face Sounds Familiar (season 4)	Round 7 Guest Performer as Donna Summer	

== Accolades ==
Year	Award	Category	Notable Work	Result
2017	30th Awit Award	Best Performance by a Female Recording Artist		Nominated

Preceded by Lyca Gairanod	The Voice of the Philippines; Winner; 2015	Succeeded by Joshua Oliveros
Preceded by Lyca Gairanod	The Voice of the Philippines Kids; Winner; 2015	Succeeded by Joshua Oliveros
