= Primark Town Center =

Philippine land developer

Philippine Primark Properties
- Trade name: Primark Town Center
- Formerly: LKY Prime Builders
- Type: Private
- Industry: Retail
- Founded: 1996; 30 years ago
- Headquarters: San Juan, Philippines
- Number of locations: 47
- Area served: Philippines
- Key people: Wilbert T. Lee (President and CEO)
- Parent: LKY Group
- Website: primark.com.ph

Primark Town Center is a Philippine community mall chain. It forms part of the LKY Group, one of the Philippines' largest land developers. The management is handled by Philippine Primark Properties, Inc., and headed by Wilbert T. Lee as the company's president and CEO.

== Etymology ==
Primark is a combination of words "Primary" and "Market". The name is in line to the company's vision by providing prime retail facilities and in providing the basic and primary needs of the community.

== History ==
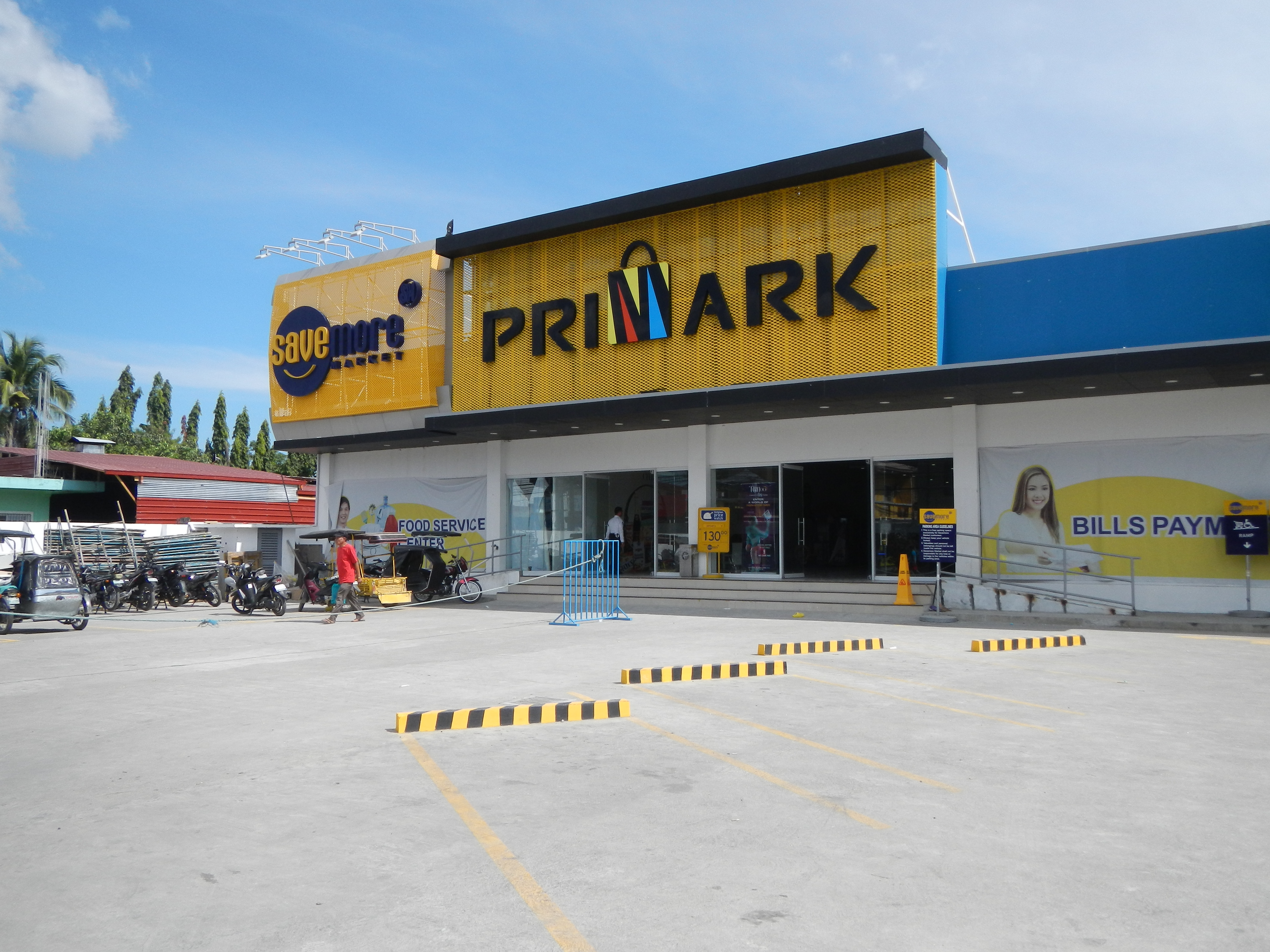
Primark Town Center Cabiao with Primark's old logo in 2015

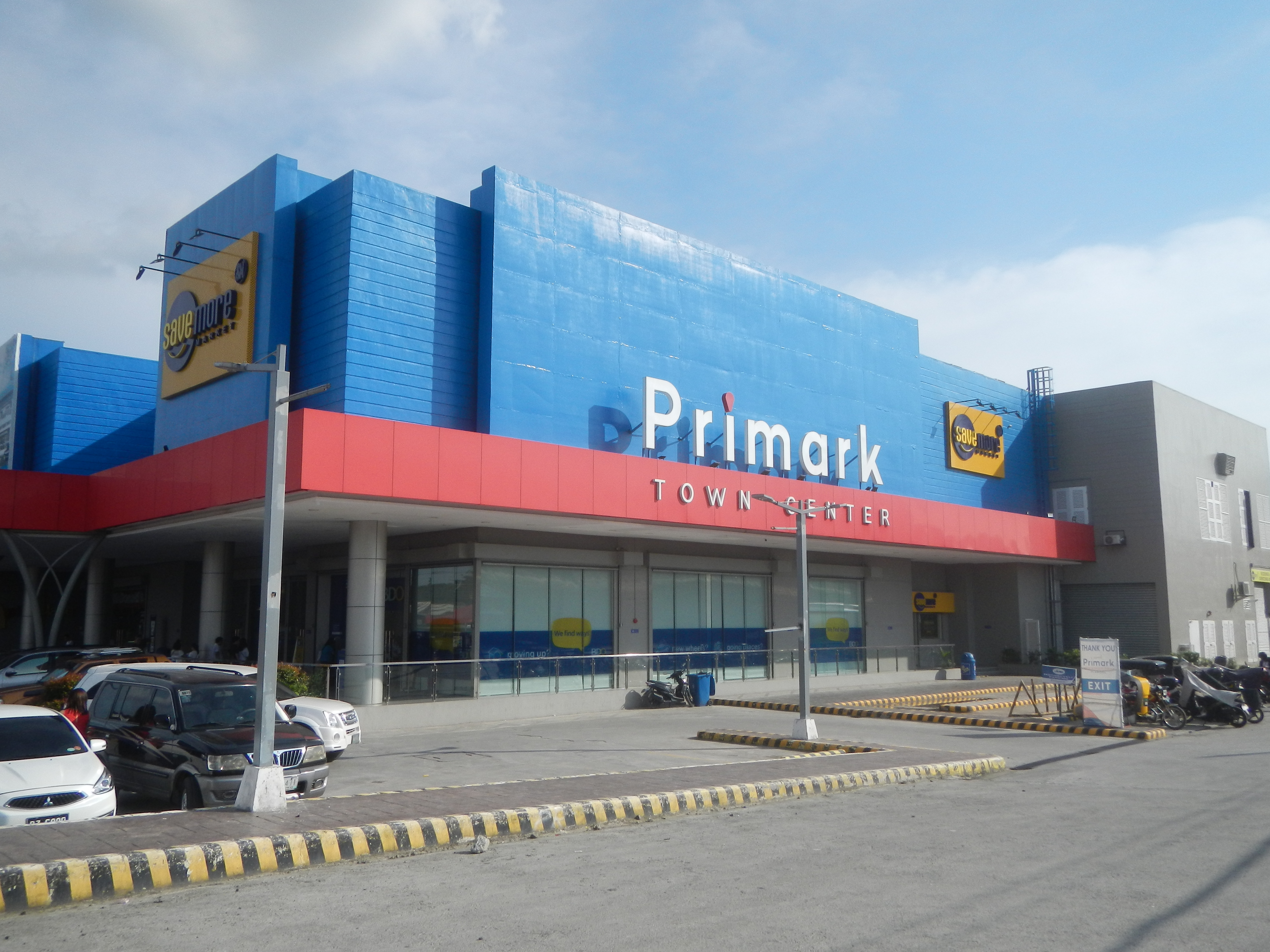
Primark Town Center Plaridel

LKY Prime Builders Inc., a subsidiary of the prominent LKY Group, was established in 1996 with a core focus on construction services and real estate development. After more than a decade in these sectors, the company made a strategic pivot into the mall business.

In 2007, LKY Prime Builders made a significant investment of ₱1.2 billion as its initial public offering (IPO), signaling its serious intent to enter the retail property market. With the green light from the Securities and Exchange Commission (SEC), the company embarked on an ambitious expansion plan to open 12 community malls within its first year of operation.

The rollout of these new retail hubs began with the inauguration of their first mall in Cabiao, Nueva Ecija, on November 28, 2014. This was swiftly followed by the opening of the Echague, Isabela branch in April 2015. Primark's footprint rapidly grew to include three branches in Sorsogon City, one of which was notably acquired from the defunct Sorsogon Shopping Center. Further expansion saw new malls in the cities of Cauayan and Tuguegarao in Isabela and Cagayan provinces respectively, Binmaley, Pangasinan, Antipolo and Teresa in Rizal, and Muñoz, Nueva Ecija.

These initial Primark Town Centers quickly attracted major tenants, including SM Savemore Market, Ace Hardware, BDO, Chinabank and McDonald's, all of which were planned to be key occupants in future mall developments. Of the initial ₱1.2 billion investment, approximately ₱867 million, or 72.25%, was specifically allocated to the construction of these first twelve malls in 2015, with the remaining capital earmarked for future sites across the country.

By early 2016, Primark announced its strategic entry into the Visayas and Mindanao regions. Tacloban was designated as the site for the first Primark branch in Visayas, while Tacurong would host the inaugural Mindanao branch, following Primark's acquisition of Tacurong's MS Store.

Currently, the operations and management of all Primark Town Centers fall under the purview of Philippine Primark Properties Inc., with the LKY Group serving as its overarching parent company.

In 2024, certain Savemore Markets branches located within Primark Town Centers in Rosario, Noveleta, and Macabebe ceased operations.

== See also ==
- CityMall
