= CityMall Imus =

- Location: Imus, Cavite
- Coordinates: 14.397697°N 120.939650°E
- Address: Aguinaldo Highway, Anabu
- Opened: August 12, 2015; 11 years ago
- Developer: DoubleDragon-SMIC
- Owner: CityMall
- Floor area: 20,943 square metres (225,430 sq ft)

CityMall Imus is a shopping mall in Imus, Cavite. It is owned by CityMall. It opened on August 12, 2015.

== Overview ==
CityMall Imus is considered to be one of the biggest independent malls in the Philippines. It has a CFA of 196,465.29 sq ft (18,252.223 square metres).

CityMall Imus is the first CityMall in Luzon and the third nationwide, It has shops from the Jollibee Foods Corporation Group, the SM Group, and other companies including Western Union, Lee, and others. It also has a cinema.
