= Esang de Torres =

Filipina teen singer, songwriter and stage actress

Esang De Torres
- Also known as: The Little Broadway Diva Mini Lea Salonga
- Born: Telesa Marie Castillejo De Torres; February 12, 2007 (age 19); Tondo, Manila, Philippines
- Genres: Broadway; Pop; Contemporary; OPM; Ballad
- Occupations: Singer; Actress
- Instruments: Vocals; Piano; Guitar; Ukulele
- Years active: 2014–present
- Labels: Star Magic (2014–2015, 2025–present); MCA Music Inc. (2015–2016); PolyEast Records (2022–2024)
- Website: Instagram

Telesa Marie Castillejo "Esang" de Torres (born February 12, 2007), is a Filipino singer, songwriter and stage actress best known for appearing as Lea Salonga on the "MiniMe" segment of ABS-CBN's It's Showtime, and joining the second season of The Voice Kids Philippines, ultimately picking Lea Salonga as her coach.

At age 9, De Torres became the youngest artist to stage a major solo concert in the Philippines. At that time she released her first solo album, Ako ay Kakanta." In 2016, she had her professional musical theatre debut as Little Cosette in the Manila run of the musical Les Misérables. De Torres played the same role in the musical's Singapore run. In 2017, De Torres played her first lead role as Matilda in the Manila run of Broadway's Matilda the Musical. She was also a contestant on ABS-CBN's fourth season of Your Face Sounds Familiar: Kids (season 2) where she finished as 3rd placer.

"I believe my music is always based on what I express on. It's like my inner voice coming through," De Torres states.

== Life and career ==
Early life

Esang De Torres was born in Manila, to Mary Joyce and Telesforo De Torres. She hails from Tondo, Manila. Esang has an older brother named James, who is also involved in such musical skills such as playing the guitar and piano. When she was just 2, De Torres started humming tunes. The first song she ever sang on a karaoke machine was Andy Williams' 'The Shadow of Your Smile'. When she turned 3, she could sing anything she listened to. Both her parents' side are musically inclined. Thus, her talents have been very well supported. Her father was her first coach, who taught her the basics of singing. He was a band vocalist and a theatre singer back in the day.

=== 2011–2014: SM Little Stars, I-Shine Talent Camp 3 and It's Showtime's MiniMe ===
De Torres joined various talent shows. Her first singing competition was at the age of 4. At the age of 5, she joined the SM Little Stars 2013 where she sang Beyonce's "Listen" and placed 3rd. In 2014, she was named Best in Talent portraying as Lea Salonga's MiniMe in the noontime show It's Showtime (ABS-CBN). One of the hosts cried after she sang her rendition of "Tomorrow" from Annie as he was touched by her youthful performance. Since then, she was dubbed on TV as "Mini Lea Salonga." On the same year, she became the Grand Winner in Promil Pre-School I-Shine Talent Camp 3 (ABS-CBN), with Zsa Zsa Padilla as her coach. The prize included a contract from Star Magic.

=== 2015: The Voice Kids Philippines Season 2 ===
In 2015, when she was 8, De Torres auditioned for the second season of The Voice Kids Philippines. Her rendition of "Home" (from The Wiz) had all the coaches turning for her. She received a standing ovation from all of them even before the performance ended. Salonga immediately recognized her as the young singer on It's Showtime's MiniMe segment as Lea. Bamboo was speechless, while Sarah Geronimo immediately showed respect to the 8-year-old, telling her that she is an "extraordinary child" and that she is a "big fan" of De Torres. The three coaches fought hard for her, with Geronimo showing the trophy of The Voice, reminding her of Geronimo's wins from previous seasons. However, Salonga immediately dismissed Geronimo's reminder, telling De Torres that "the future is more important." Salonga then brought out a book to write a story about a beautiful princess with a beautiful voice named "Esang", and that she will help the young singer win and they "will live happily ever after." De Torres ultimately picked Salonga as her coach. Her audition has over 28 million views to date.

During the battle rounds, De Torres, along with teammate Bianca and Stephanie sang "Somewhere Out There." When Geronimo was asked to choose among the three of them, she picked Esang, saying "this child has crushed my heart ever since the blind auditions." Salonga chose De Torres to move on to the Sing- offs.

During the Sing-offs, she sang her rendition of Leah Navarro's "Isang Mundo, Isang Awit." She, along with teammate Reynan Dal- Anay moved on to the live shows.

During the semi-finals of the live shows, De Torres sang "Salamat, Salamat Musika" which earned praises from Geronimo and Salonga, the latter saying, "clearly, the moment you entered that stage, you are a star. You are just a star" and that "you are a complete package: the voice, the looks, everything. I thank God that you have chosen me as your coach, and that He gave you that talent. What a talented kid." Geronimo expressed how 'sharpened' already De Torres was, and that she 'salutes' the 8-year-old. De torres moved on to the finals, along with Reynan Dal Anay, Elha Nympha and Sassa Dagdag.

In the first part of the finals, De Torres had a duet with Billy Crawford, singing "Count on Me" by Bruno Mars. This performance earned her a standing ovation from all the coaches. Geronimo remarked on how 'refreshing' her performance was, and that she had shown her 'light and fun side' as compared to her previous performances where she had shown maturity beyond her age. Same goes with Salonga, saying "that was the most fun I have had on this show" and that "you reminded us that you are only 8 years old, but still incredible." Then came the upbeat rounds, with her singing ABBA's "Dancing Queen". On the last part of the finals, the ballad rounds, De Torres sang her rendition of "Somewhere" from West Side Story. Salonga then took the moment to say her final words for De Torres' performance: "You are versatile. Musical. Intelligent- and you are eight years old; and you're a star. You deserve to win this championship: because you have everything that every singer dreams of." Salonga then urged the viewers one last time, saying "you have it all- the heart, the intonation, everything from an 8-year-old. Philippines, vote for this child: she is just incredible." De Torres came in third, with Elha Nympha winning the title.

=== 2015–2016: Post The Voice Kids ===
After her stint on The Voice Kids, De Torres appeared at various TV shows and events. On September 5, she and The Voice Kids Philippines Season 1 and 2 contestants held a concert entitled "Boses ng Bulilit, Muling Bibirit" which was aired on ABS-CBN. On September 20 at FAMAS Awards, De Torres, with Kuh Ledesma serenaded the "Iconic Movie Queens of Philippine Cinema" namely: Susan Roces, Gloria Romero, Nora Aunor, Maricel Soriano, Dawn Zulueta, and Sarah Geronimo. On January 25, 2016, De Torres performed for Miss Universe 2015 Pia Wurtzbach in Manila during her homecoming visit.

=== 2016: Ako ay Kakanta Birthday Concert ===
On February 12, 2016, 9-year-old De Torres held her first major solo concert entitled "Ako ay Kakanta: Birthday Concert" at Skydome, SM North. She then released her first solo album entitled Ako ay Kakanta which is available on iTunes. This made her the youngest artist to stage a major solo concert in the Philippines.

=== 2016: Les Misérables- Auditions and Musical Theatre Debut ===
During the gala night of Les Misérables in Manila, Salonga's mother, Ligaya, recommended the 9-year-old De Torres to musical theatre producer Cameron Mackintosh. The young singer then was invited to audition for the role of Little Cosette at the Opera House. She sang "Castle on a Cloud" in front of the directors and composer himself Claude-Michel Schönberg. One of them stated that she was, indeed, perfect pitch. Another one promised that the 9-year-old would still sing that well ten years later. Four days later, she got a call that she was cast as Little Cosette. Mackintosh then announced that De Torres will part in the international casting of the Manila production of Les Misérables. In the interview, she said that she is very thankful that she is given the role, and that she dreams of making it big in theatre like her coach Lea Salonga. She made her professional theatre debut on April 8 at the Solaire Theatre. Spectators said considering that she was cast with mostly British actors, they did not see any sign of nervousness in her. Few weeks later, De Torres was heading to Singapore to continue her career in musical theatre as she plays the same role in its Singapore run.

=== 2017: Matilda the Musical ===
On August 1, 2017 after going through open call auditions, Atlantis Theatrical Entertainment Group announced that De Torres will play the lead role in the Manila run of Broadway's Tony Award-winning Matilda the Musical starting November 10. This is her first lead role in a Broadway musical. A review of the show's preview night reveals a standing ovation for De Torres and how she has significantly improved her voice since her stint on The Voice Kids.

=== 2018: Your Face Sounds Familiar: Kids ===
In 2018, De Torres joins ABS-CBN's Your Face Sounds Familiar: Kids (season 2) as one of the contestants. from week 1 to week 16, she impersonated Lady Gaga, Cher, Lea Salonga, John Legend, Christina Aguilera, Jake Zyrus, Cyndi Lauper, Adele, Bonnie Tyler, Joey Albert, Freddie Mercury of Queen, Julie Andrews, Liza Minnelli, Aretha Franklin, Jaya with Elizabeth Ramsey impersonated by Awra Briguela and Barbra Streisand. She won on week 5 as Christina Aguilera and week 12 as Liza Minnelli.

=== 2026: Philippine Selection Night ===
In August 2026, she, along with Elha Nympha, Lance Reblando, and Nar Cabico is announced as one of the artists participating in the Philippine Selection Night, the national selection for the Eurovision Song Contest Asia 2026, with the song "Chéri(e)", composed by Cabico.

== Discography ==
=== (2017-2018) ===
- Awit sa Marawi
- Habang Buhay, May Pag-asa
- Limos
- Paraiso
- Pasko ng Pilipino

=== Ako ay Kakanta (2016) ===
- Ako ay Kakanta
- Batang Makulet
- Friend
- Kung Bubuksan Mo Lang ang Puso
- Pag-Ibig ang Sagot
- Nanay Ko, Tatay Ko
- Your Angel
- May Bukas Pa

== See also ==
- The Voice Kids (Philippines Season 2)
