= CityMall (Philippines) =

Shopping mall chain in the Philippines

CityMall Commercial Centers, Inc.

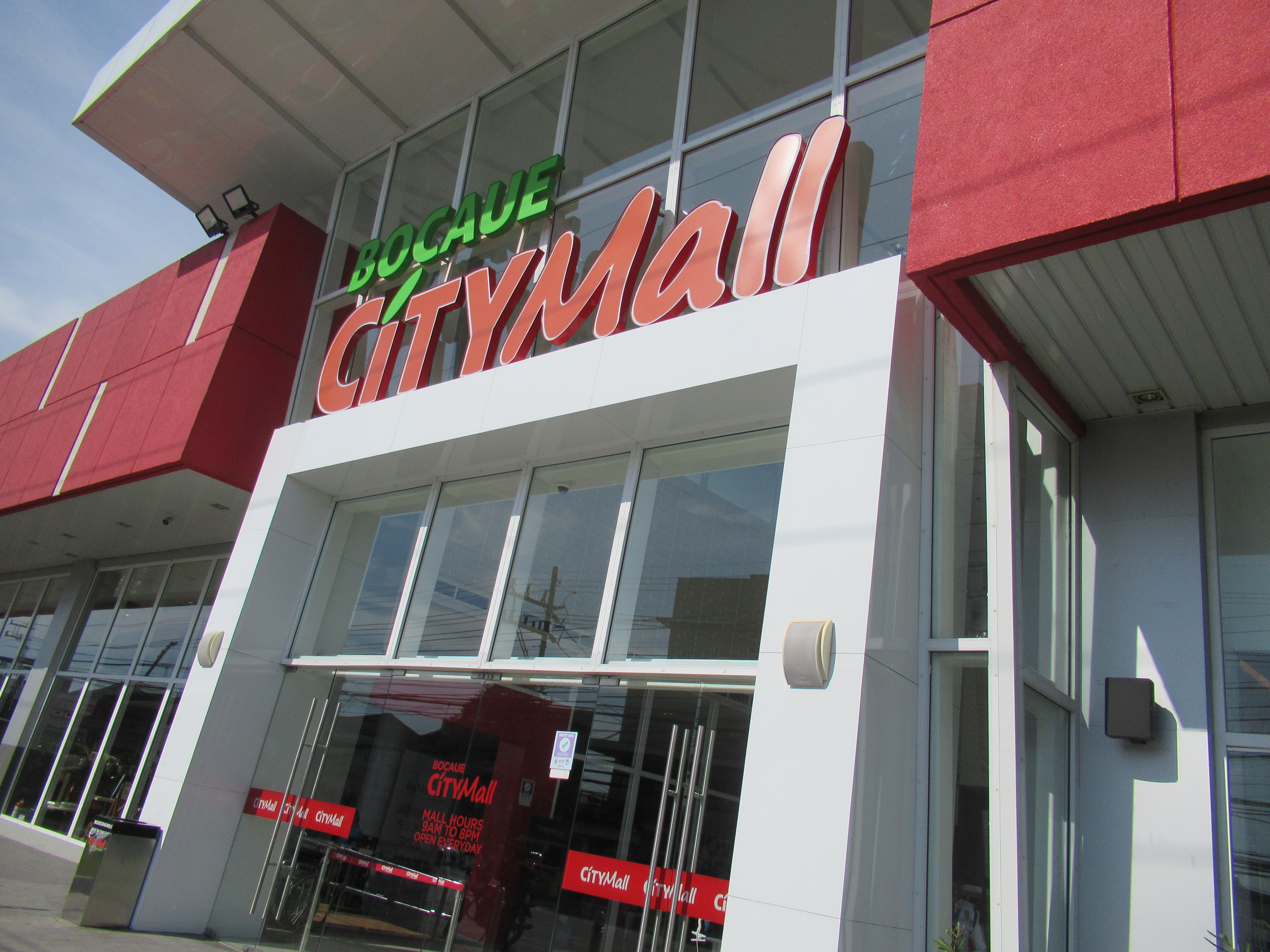
- CityMall branch in Bocaue
- Type: Subsidiary
- Traded as: CityMall Philippines
- Industry: Shopping malls
- Founded: 2013; 13 years ago
- Number of locations: 43
- Area served: Philippines
- Key people: Edgar Sia and Tony Tan Caktiong (co-founders, Chairman and CEO)
- Owner: DoubleDragon Properties (66%); SM Investments (34%)
- Website: www.doubledragon.com.ph/article/citymall

CityMall Commercial Centers, simply known as CityMall, is a Philippine community shopping mall chain formed as a subsidiary of DoubleDragon Properties. As of 2023, it has 43 branches across the Philippines.

== History ==
The CityMall brand was launched in late March 2015, with CityMall Arnaldo, Roxas as its first mall.

In November 2016, Grand CityMall Mandalagan, Bacolod made its grand opening, making it the first Grand CityMall to open.

== Branches ==
Name	Opening Date	Land area (m^{2})	Floor area (m^{2})	Location and description	Remarks
CityMall Arnaldo-Roxas	March 27, 2015	14,000	7,350 + annex	Arnaldo Boulevard, Baybay, Roxas, Capiz	First CityMall to open in both Capiz and Western Visayas. It is anchored by Robinson Retail's Robinsons Supermarket, Robinsons Handyman, Robinsons Appliances, and Daiso Japan.
CityMall Consolacion	May 27, 2015	10,251		Sta. Lucia Townsquare, Cansaga, Consolacion, Cebu	First CityMall with SM Savemore as their anchor supermarket and the first in both Cebu and the Central Visayas region. The mall is contracted with a 30-year leasing agreement with Eagle Land Development Corporation.
CityMall Anabu	August 12, 2015	20,943		Aguinaldo Highway, Anabu, Imus, Cavite	First CityMall in Cavite and Calabarzon. The mall is located at Liwayway Marketing Corporation's vacant lot with a 26-year leasing agreement between CityMall and Liwayway.
CityMall Tetuan	September 30, 2015	15,344		Don Alfaro Street, Tetuan, Zamboanga City	First CityMall in Zamboanga City and Zamboanga Peninsula and the first CityMall with a local anchor supermarket, Shop-O-Rama Hypermarket.
CityMall Tagbak	October 10, 2015	5,500		Tagbak, Jaro, Iloilo City	Supermarket is anchored by Iloilo Supermart. The mall is contracted with a 26-year leasing agreement with Iloilo Commercial Development Corporation.
CityMall Kalibo	April 25, 2016	11,000		F. Quimpo Street Extension, Kalibo, Aklan	
CityMall Tiaong	May 7, 2016	8,000		Maharlika Highway, Lalig, Tiaong, Quezon	Serves residents and tourists inside Villa Escudero Plantations and Resort, CityMall Villa Escudero is set to operate with a 26-year long-term lease. It is also the first CityMall in both Quezon
CityMall Parola	July 14, 2016	12,734		Parola, Iloilo City	CityMall Parola was having trouble before its opening after the officials of Iloilo City found out that it does not have a business permit. It all started when conflicts arose on the joint venture agreement between CityMall and the Parola Ferry Terminal (also known as the Guimaras-Iloilo Ferry Terminal). However, the problem with their permit seemed to be solved following the mall's grand opening last July 14, 2016.
CityMall Cotabato	October 18, 2016	15,000		Gov. Gutierrez Ave., Cotabato City	The biggest CityMall at its opening in terms of gross floor area (with regards to Grand CityMalls) and the first national retail mall in Cotabato City and Bangsamoro. And with regards to Grand CityMalls, CityMall Cotabato will be the first CityMall to have its own cinemas.
CityMall Mandalagan	November 8, 2016	10,000		Lacson St., Mandalagan, Bacolod	First Grand CityMall in Bacolod.
CityMall Kabankalan	February 14, 2017	15,000		Corner Lizaran and Bonifacio Streets, Kabankalan, Negros Occidental	
CityMall Victorias	February 15, 2017	13,734		Osmeña Avenue, Victorias, Negros Occidental	
CityMall Boracay	February 25, 2017	10,000		Boracay Tambisaan Jetty Port Road, Boracay, Malay, Aklan	Like CityMall Anabu, Imus and CityMall Villa Escudero, CityMall Boracay is set to operate with a 26-year long-term lease.
CityMall Tagum	February 28, 2017	19,384		Lapu-Lapu Street, Tagum	The first CityMall in Davao Region. It also anchors the first SM's Simply Shoes in Mindanao.
CityMall Dumaguete	August 8, 2017	13,000		Dumaguete North Road, Daro, Dumaguete City	The first mall to bring SaveMore Market in Dumaguete City and Negros Oriental
CityMall Koronadal	November 8, 2017	14,800		General Santos Drive, Morales, Koronadal, South Cotabato	The first CityMall in Soccsksargen Region
CityMall Iponan	October 12, 2018	11,957		Butuan-Cagayan de Oro-Iligan Road (National Highway), Brgy. Iponan, Cagayan de Oro	The first CityMall to open in Cagayan de Oro and the first in Northern Mindanao.
CityMall Bacalso	April 30, 2022	11,000		N. Bacalso Avenue, Cebu City	Second CityMall in Cebu
CityMall Bocaue	September 8, 2022	9,000		MacArthur Highway, Bunlo, Bocaue, Bulacan	
CityMall Surigao	July 28, 2023	7,200		Pan-Philippine Highway, Luna, Surigao City	First CityMall in Surigao and the first in the Caraga Region (Originally scheduled to open in 2018).

== See also ==
- Primark Town Center
