= Ililigtas Ka Niya =

Single by Gary Valenciano

from the album FPJ's Ang Probinsyano: The Official Soundtrack
- Released: September 26, 2018
- Genre: Soul music, gospel
- Length: 4:55
- Label: Star Music
- Composer: Jonathan Manalo
- Lyricist: Jonathan Manalo

Gary Valenciano singles chronology
| "Anong Nangyari Sa Ating Dalawa" (2018) | "Ililigtas Ka Niya" (2018) |

Lyric video
- "Ililigtas Ka Niya" on YouTube

"Ililigtas Ka Niya" (lit. 'He Will Save You') is a song recorded by Filipino singer Gary Valenciano. The song was released on September 26, 2018 for the soundtrack of FPJ's Ang Probinsyano.

== Other versions ==
In 2020, ABS-CBN singers sang the song for the people who battles the COVID-19.
