= CityMall Arnaldo-Roxas =

- Location: Roxas, Capiz, Philippines
- Coordinates: 11°35′31″N 122°45′9″E
- Address: Arnaldo Blvd, Baybay
- Opened: March 27, 2015; 11 years ago
- Developer: DoubleDragon Corporation
- Manager: CityMall Commercial Centers Inc.
- Floor area: 7,035 m^{2} (75,720 sq ft)
- Floors: 1
- Website: citymall.com.ph

CityMall Arnaldo-Roxas is a shopping mall located at Arnaldo Blvd, Roxas, Capiz. It is the first mall under the CityMall brand in the Philippines which is developed and owned by DoubleDragon Corporation. It was completed on December 15, 2014 and was opened March 27, 2015. The mall is part of the CityMall Arnaldo-Roxas complex and is the first of the two CityMalls in Roxas City.

== Overview ==
CityMall Arnaldo-Roxas has a total land area of 1.2 ha (130,000 sq ft), 7,035 m^{2} (75,720 sq ft) or retail space housing a supermarket, food court, and retail shops. It is equipped with solar panels and a rain collection system.
