= Gary Valenciano discography =

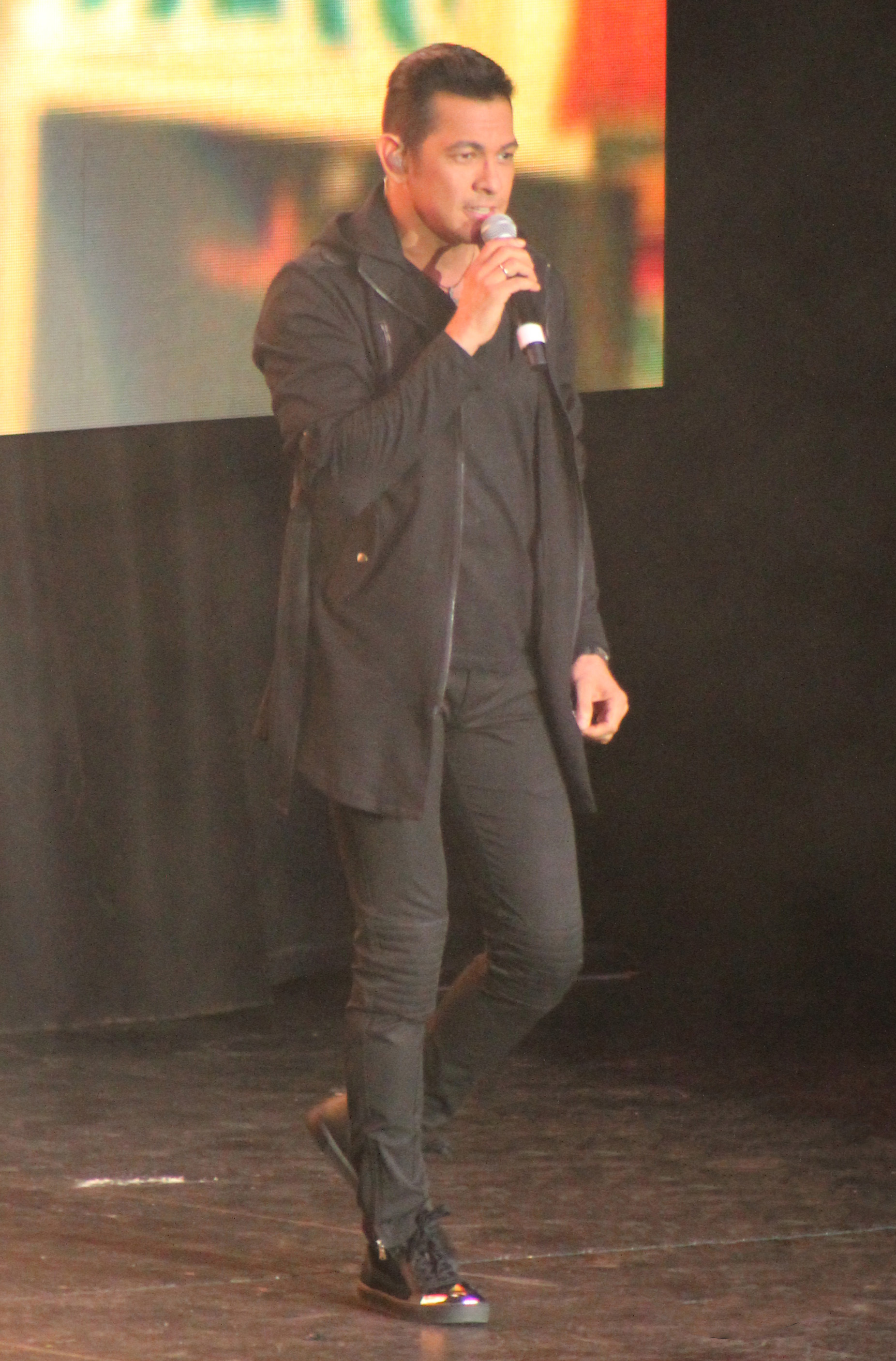
- Valenciano performing in Toronto in 2014
- Studio albums: 26
- Soundtrack albums: 12
- Live albums: 3
- Compilation albums: 7
- Tribute albums: 1
- Music videos: 14

This page presents the albums and singles discography of Filipino multi-awarded singer Gary Valenciano. As of 2000, he has sold more than a million albums in the Philippines, becoming one of the best-selling Filipino recording artist of all time. His album "Shout for Joy" has sold 200,000 copies nationwide.

== Studio albums ==
Year	Album details	Certifications (sales thresholds)
1984	Gary: Released: 1984; Label: Blackgold/Vicor	
1985	Gary... Next: Released: 1985; Label: Blackgold/Vicor	
1986	Gary Inside Out: Released: 1986; Label: Blackgold/Vicor	
1986	From Gary, Merry Christmas: Released: 1986; Label: WEA Records	
1987	Moving Thoughts: Released: 1987; Label: WEA Records	
1989	Faces of Love: Released: 1989; Label: WEA Records	
1991	Shout4Joy: Released: 1991; Label: WEA Records	
1992	Dancin' in the Moonlight (Note: Album was released in Japan under Toshiba-EMI): Released: 1992; Label: Toshiba-EMI	
1993	Hataw Na!: Released: 1993; Label: Universal Records	
1995	Outside Looking In (Note: Album was released internationally under Polygram Records): Released: 1995; Label: PolyGram	
1995	Out of the Dark (Note: Album was released in the United States): Released: 1995; Label: Graceland	
1996	From Gary, Merry Christmas (Repackaged): Released: 1996; Label: Universal Records	
1999	Interactive: Released: 1999; Label: Universal Records	PARI: Gold
2000	Revive: Released: 2000; Label: Universal Records	PARI: 6× Platinum
2002	one2one: Released: 2002; Label: VIVA	PARI: Platinum
2003	At the Movies: Released: 2003; Label: Universal Records	PARI: Platinum
2003	I Will Be Here: Released: 2003; Label: Universal Records	
2003	Beyond Words: Released: 2003; Label: Universal Records	
2005	Soul Full: Released: 2005; Label: Universal Records	PARI: Gold
2005	Pure Heart: Released: 2005; Label: Star Music	PARI: Platinum
2006	Relevance: Released: 2006; Label: Universal Records	PARI: Platinum
2008	Rebirth: Released: April 24, 2008; Label: Universal Records	
2009	As 1 (with Martin Nievera) (Note: As 1 is a collaborative album, with Martin Nievera): Released: 2009; Label: Universal Records	
2010	Replay: Released: 2010; Label: Universal Records	
2011	With Love: Released: 2011; Label: Star Music	
2012	Sings Just For You: Released: 2012; Label: Universal Records	
2014	With You: Released: 2014; Label: Universal Records	
2016	@Primetime: Released: June 26, 2016; Label: Star Music	

== Live albums ==
Year	Album details
1989	Heart And Soul Live!: Released: 1988; Label: WEA Records
1993	Shout Live!: Released: 1993; Label: Universal Records
1995	Move Live!: Released: 1995; Label: Universal Records

== Compilation albums ==
Year	Album details	Certifications (sales thresholds)
1989	The Best Of Gary Valenciano: Released: 1986; Label: Blackgold/Vicor	
1994	Paano: Released: 1994; Label: Blackgold/Vicor	
1997	Greatest Hits Vol. 1 and 2: Released: 1997; Label: Universal Records	PARI: 4× Platinum
2004	Gary V: The Blackgold Box: Released: 2004; Label: Blackgold/Vicor	
2008	The Platinum Ballad Collection: 25th Anniversary Album: Released: 2008; Label: Universal Records	
2014	Gaya Ng Dati: An All Filipino OPM Collection: Released: 2014; Label: Universal Records	
2015	Gold: Released: 2015; Label: Universal Records	

== Collaboration albums ==
- Salubungin Ang Pasko (Universal Records, 1982)
- Ginintuang Diwa ng Pasko (Universal Records, 1989)
- 18 Classic OPM Love Songs (PolyEast Records Philippines, 1998)
- The Best Of Crossover Presents (Viva Records, 2003)
- Only Selfless Love 2 (Universal Records, 2003)
- OPM Rewind (Universal Records, 2004)
- The Love Song Collection (Universal Records, 2004)
- Top Male OPM Hits (Star Music, 2004)
- Various Movie Themes (Vicor Music, 2005)
- Nagmamahal Kapamilya Songs For Global (Star Records, 2005)
- Best Of OPM Inspirational Songs (Universal Records, 2005)
- Best Of OPM Love Duets (Universal Records, 2005)
- Best Of OPM Love Ballads (Universal Records, 2005)
- Best Of OPM Movie & TV Themes (Universal Records, 2005)
- Pinoy Biggie Hits (Star Music, 2006)
- OPM With Love (Universal Records, 2006)
- Lovestruck Vol. 1 (Viva Records, 2006)
- OPM Gold (Universal Records, 2006)
- OPM Superstars Christmas (Universal Records, 2006)
- Hotsilog The ASAP Hotdog Compilation (Star Music, 2006)
- Top Male OPM Hits (Star Music, 2007)
- Pinoy Biggie Hits Rewind (Star Music, 2007)
- Musika At Pelikula: A Star Cinema Music Collection (Star Music, 2008)
- No.1 Signature Hits OPM's Best (Vicor Music, 2008)
- Kris Aquino: The Greatest Love (Universal Records, 2008)
- Wings of the Soul (Star Music, 2008)
- OPM No. 1's (Star Music, 2009)
- I-Star 15: Best Of TV & Movie Themes (Star Music, 2010)
- 60 Taon Ng Musika At Soap Opera (Star Music, 2010)
- OPM All-Star Christmas (Universal Records, 2010)
- Ngayong Pasko Magniningning Ang Pilipino (Star Music, 2010)
- OPM Number 1s Vol.2 (Star Music, 2011)
- I Love You (Star Music, 2011)
- Bida Best Hits Da Best (Star Music, 2011)
- Magsama Tayo Sa Kwento Ng Pasko (Star Music, 2013)

== Popular songs in chronological order ==
Valenciano's songs include:

- 1982 – Pasko Na, Sinta Ko
- 1983 – Growing Up (Theme Song of the Philippine Movie "Bagets", also covered by Mulatto Band in 1995 for the movie TGIS: The Movie.)
- 1983 – You Got Me Working
- 1983 – After All
- 1983 – Hang On
- 1983 – Fool Till The End
- 1983 – Betty's In Bed
- 1984 – Love Of Mine
- 1984 – Reaching Out (also performed by the Stars and Personalities of ABC 5 [Now TV5] as the theme song of their 5th Anniversary in 1997.)
- 1984 – Hotshots
- 1985 – Move Your Body
- 1985 – Once Upon A Life
- 1986 – Paano
- 1987 – 'Di Bale Na Lang
- 1987 – 'Wag Mo Na Sanang Isipin
- 1987 – 'Di Na Natuto
- 1987 - Sana Maulit Muli
- 1988 – Take Me Out Of The Dark
- 1989 – Eto Na Naman
- 1989 – Laughter All The Time
- 1989 – Each Passing Night (with Regine Velasquez)
- 1989 – Narito
- 1989 – Letting Go
- 1989 – Mahal Na Mahal Ko Siya
- 1990 – Natutulog Ba Ang Diyos?
- 1990 – Look In Her Eyes
- 1991 – Shout For Joy
- 1991 – Could You Be Messiah?
- 1991 - Sa Tuwing Naaalala Ka (with Sharon Cuneta)
- 1992 – Gaya Ng Dati
- 1993 – Hataw Na
- 1993 - Sa Yahweh
- 1993 – Muli (with Regine Velasquez)
- 1994 – Babalik Ka Rin
- 1995 – Hele Ni Inay
- 1997 – Until Then
- 1998 – (Everybody) Get Down
- 1998 - Pampanga
- 1999 – More And More
- 2000 – I Will Be Here [remake of an original song by Steven Curtis Chapman]
- 2001 – The Warrior Is A Child [remake of an original song by Twila Paris]
- 2002 – Can We Just Stop And Talk Awhile (with Kyla) [remake of an original song by Jose Mari Chan]
- 2002 – Kung Mawawala Ka (with Zsa Zsa Padilla)
- 2003 - Anak [remake of an original song by Freddie Aguilar]
- 2003 – Kailangan Kita
- 2004 – How Did You Know [remake of an original song by Chiqui Pineda]
- 2005 – Ikaw Lamang [theme song from the movie Dubai]
- 2005 – Break Me
- 2006 – Wait Forever
- 2007 – You Are (with Joni Villanueva)
- 2008 – Only Hope [remake of an original song by Switchfoot]
- 2008 – Ilaan Mo (Theme from ICare Compassion Ministry)
- 2009 – Tayong Dalawa [remake of an original song by Rey Valera]
- 2009 – Ayt! (with Sponge Cola)
- 2009 – And I Love You So [remake of an original song by Don McLean]
- 2010 – Kung Tayo'y Magkakalayo [remake of an original song by Rey Valera]
- 2010 – How Can I? {remake of an original song by Martin Nievera}
- 2010 - Did It Ever
- 2011 - Minsan Lang Kitang Iibigin [remake of an original song by Ariel Rivera]
- 2011 - (Where Do I Begin?) Love Story [remake of an original song by Andy Williams], [theme music from the movie In The Name Of Love]
- 2011 - Home
- 2011 - Wanted Sa Radyo
- 2012 - Hanggang Sa Dulo Ng Walang Hanggan [remake of an original song by Basil Valdez]
- 2013 - Kailangan Ko'y Ikaw [remake of an original song by Regine Velasquez]
- 2013 - Huwag Ka Lang Mawawala [remake of an original song by Ogie Alcasid]
- 2013 - Pananagutan [theme song from the teleserye Honesto]
- 2014 - Ikaw Lamang [theme song from the teleserye Ikaw Lamang, remake of an original song by Ogie Alcasid]
- 2014 - SayTay "Hey Madlang People"
- 2015 - Wag Ka Nang Umiyak [remake of an original song by Sugarfree, theme song from the teleserye FPJ's Ang Probinsyano]
- 2016 - Maalaala Mo Kaya (remake of an original song by Dulce)
- 2016 - I'll Never Love This Way Again [remake of an original song by Dionne Warwick, theme song from the movie Barcelona: A Love Untold]
- 2018 - Anong Nangyari Sa Ating Dalawa [remake of an original song by Aiza Seguerra, theme song from the teleserye FPJ's Ang Probinsyano]
- 2018 - Ililigtas Ka Niya [theme song from the teleserye FPJ's Ang Probinsyano]
- 2023 - Kapalaran (covered version from the late original singer Rico J. Puno & also used as a theme song from the action series FPJ's Batang Quiapo)
- 2023 - Walang Kapalit (covered version from the original singer & songwriter Rey Valera & also used as a 2nd theme song from the action series FPJ's Batang Quiapo)

== Music videos ==
- Bettys In Bed (Gary V's 1st music video, 1983, aired exclusively on MYX Channel in 2019)
- Mahal Na Mahal Ko Siya (1989, available on YouTube)
- Babalik Ka Rin (1992)
- These Eyes (1995)
- Until Then (1997)
- After All (1997)
- I Will Be Here (2000)
- The Warrior Is A Child (2000)
- Lupa (2000)
- Anak (2002)
- Can We Just Stop And Talk Awhile (2003, featuring Kyla)
- Break Me (2005, tribute to the late Bella Tan)
- Ikaw Lamang (2005)
- Wait Forever (2007)
- Only Hope (2008)
- Tayong Dalawa (2009)
- Did It Ever (2010)
- Walang Hanggang (2012)
- Pananagutan (2013)
- Saytay "Hey Madlang People" (2014)
- Wag Ka Nang Umiyak (2015, theme from FPJ's Ang Probinsyano)
- Ililigtas Ka Niya (2018, theme from FPJ's Ang Probinsyano)
- Kunin Mo Na Ang Lahat Sa Akin (2020, theme from FPJ's Ang Probinsyano)
