= List of entertainment events at the SM Mall of Asia complex =

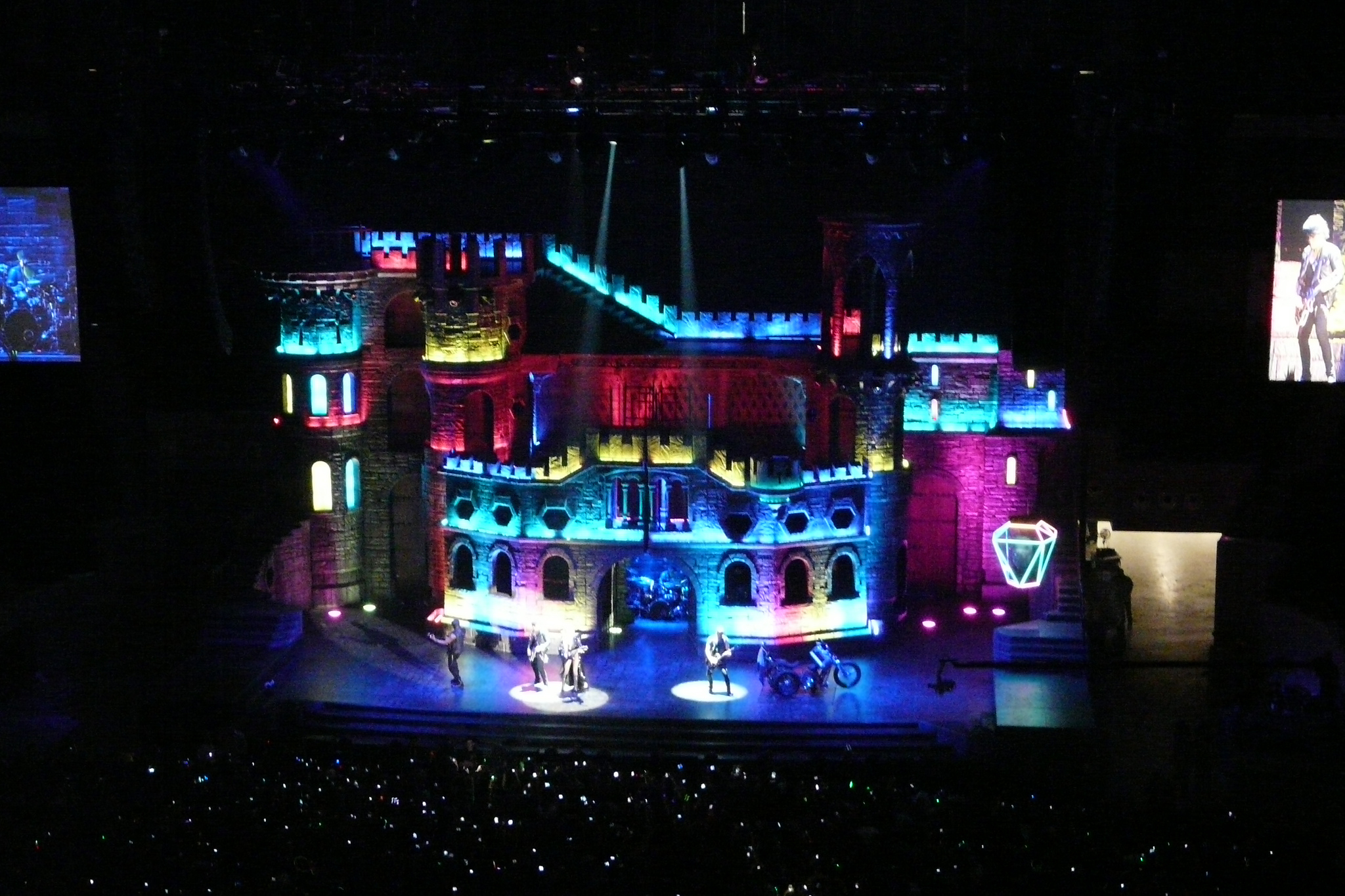
Lady Gaga performing at the SM Mall of Asia Arena on May 21, 2012, as part of the Born This Way Ball. She was the first entertainer to perform at the arena.

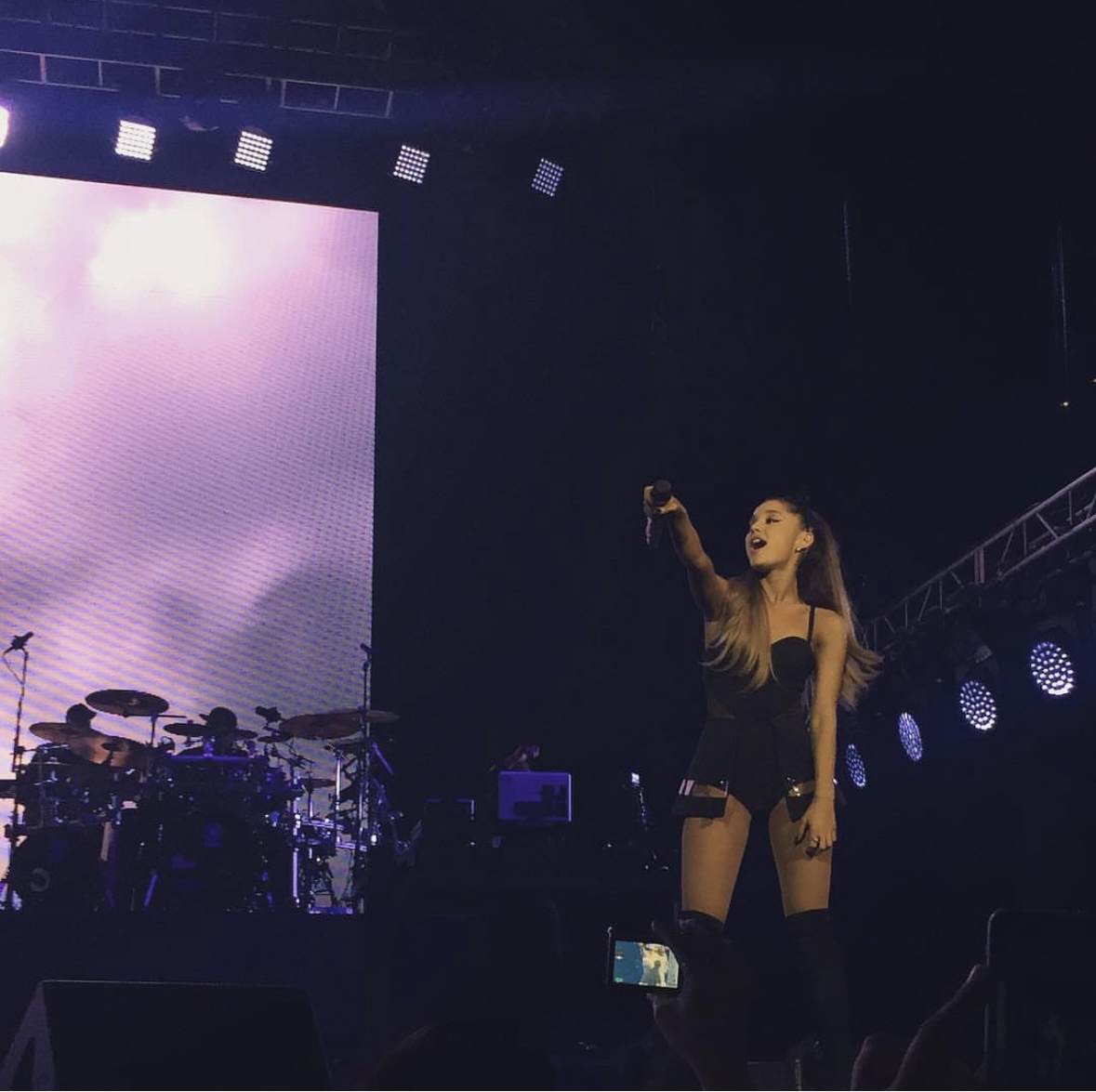
Ariana Grande performing "Best Mistake" at the arena on August 23, 2015, during The Honeymoon Tour.

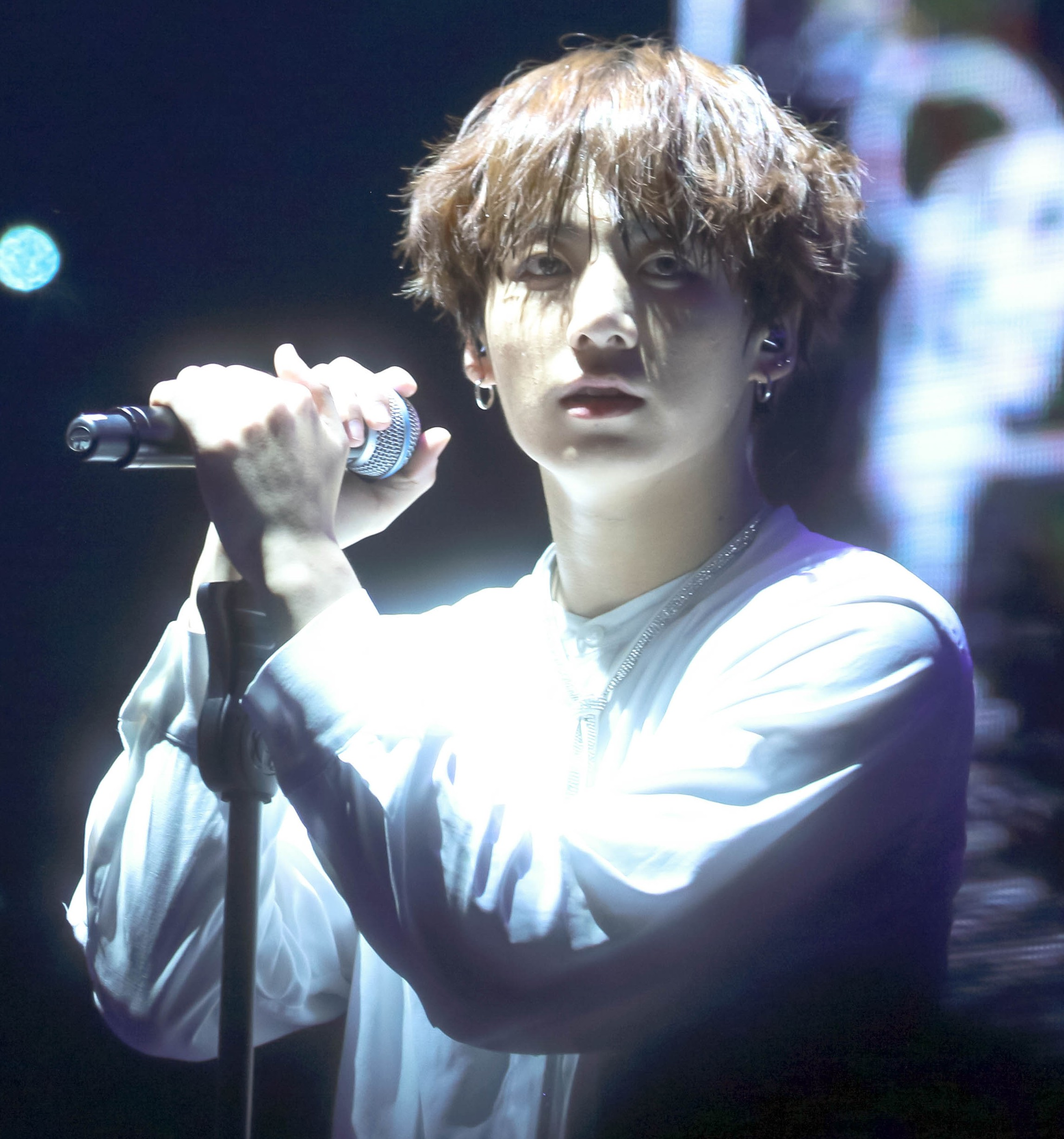
Jung Kook performing at the arena on July 30, 2016, during BTS' The Most Beautiful Moment in Life On Stage: Epilogue.

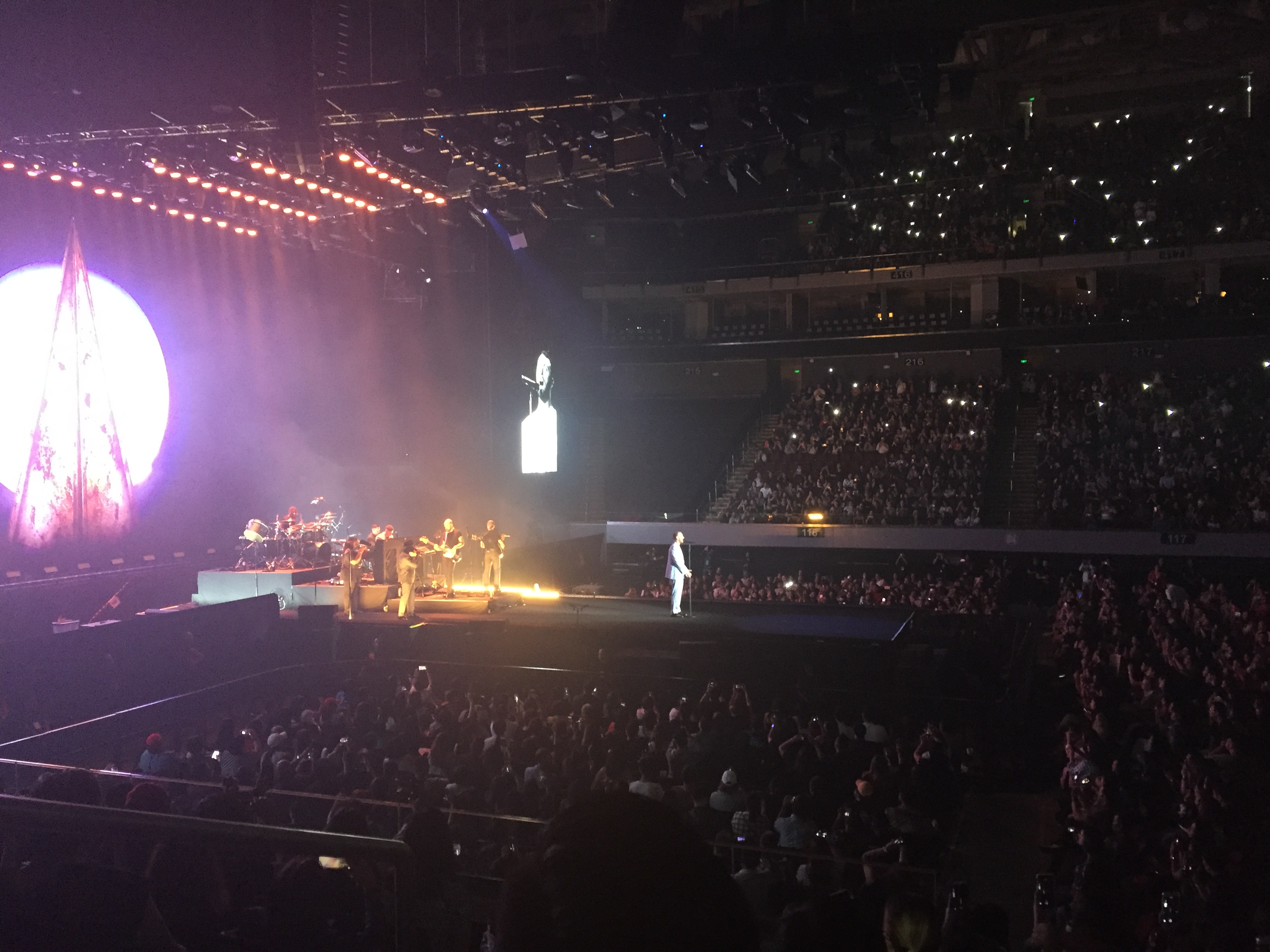
Sam Smith's The Thrill of It All Tour at the SM Mall of Asia Arena on October 5, 2018

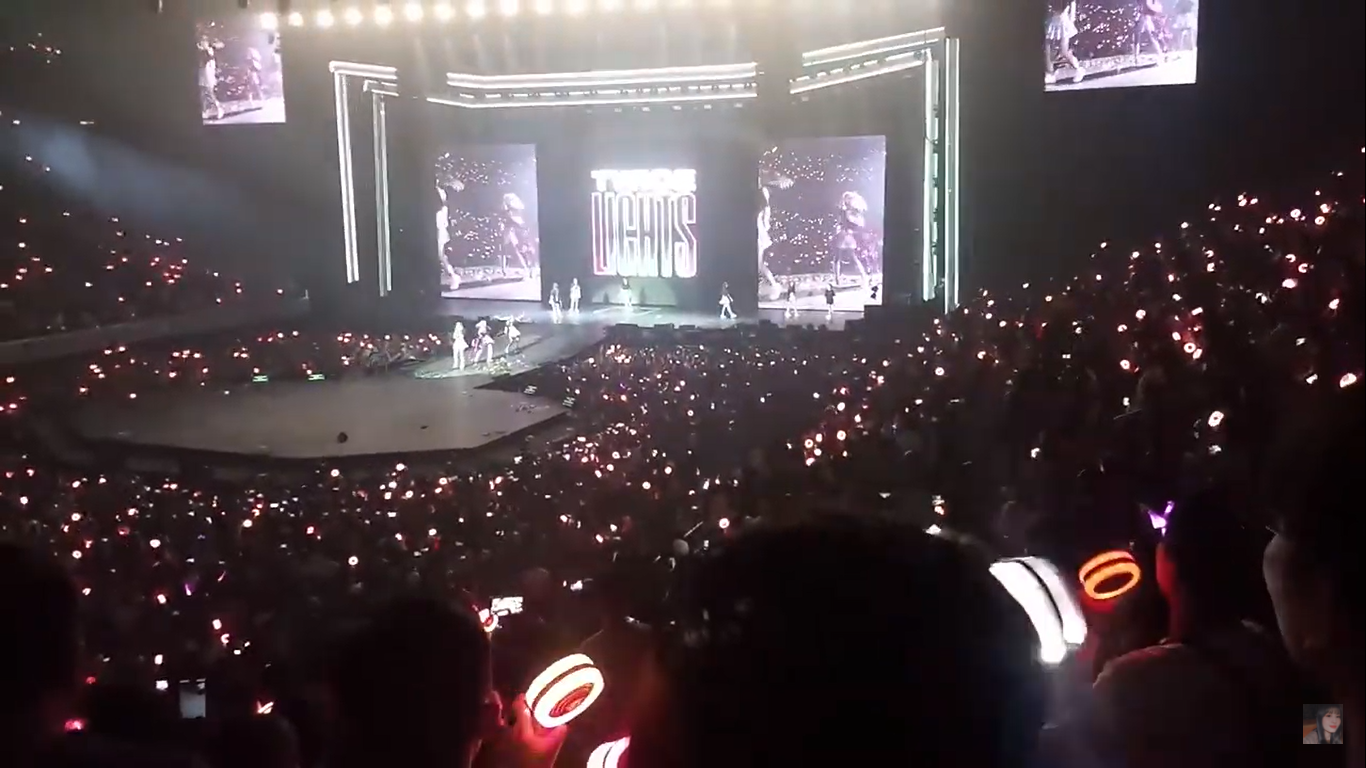
Twice performing at the arena on June 29, 2019, for their Twicelights World Tour.

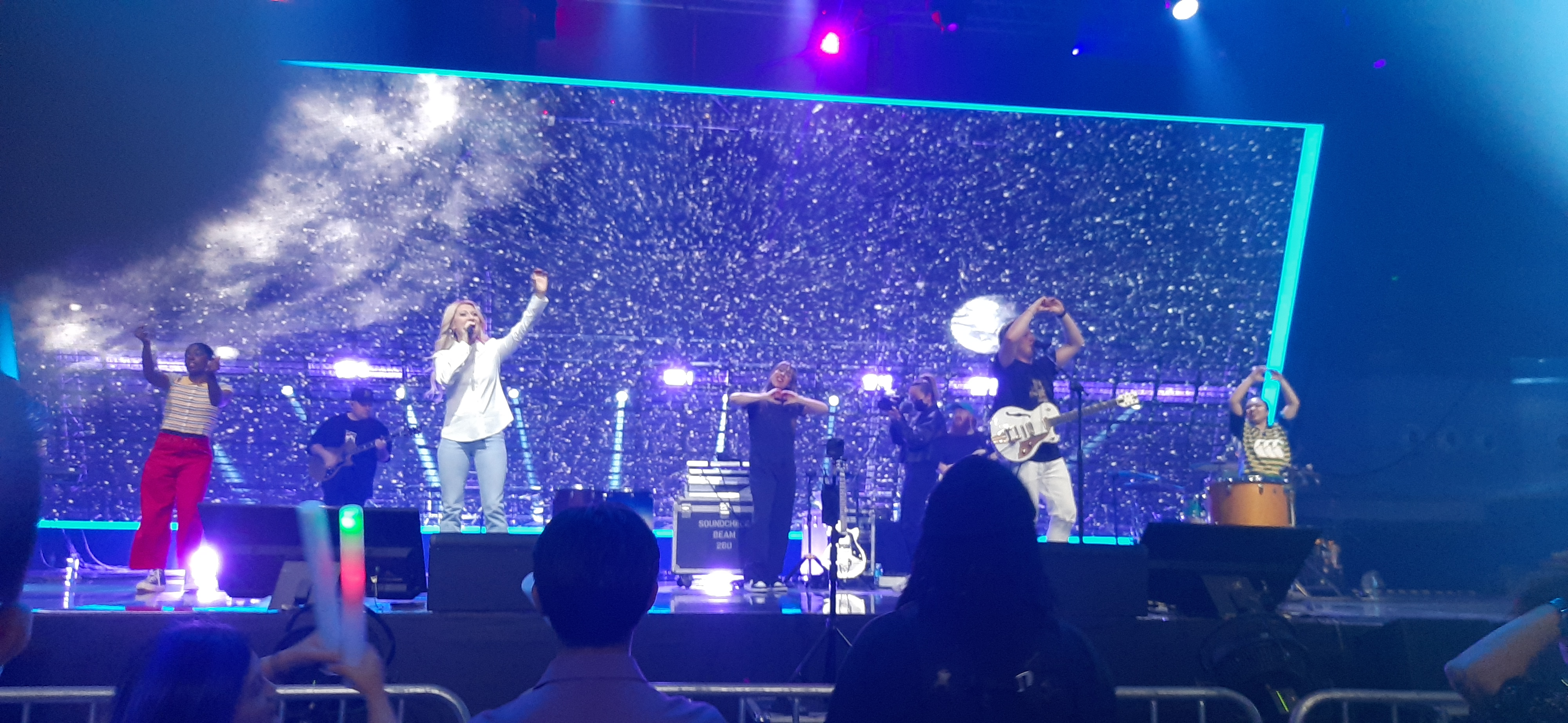
Planetshakers performs at the SM Mall of Asia Arena for the first time in September 2022.

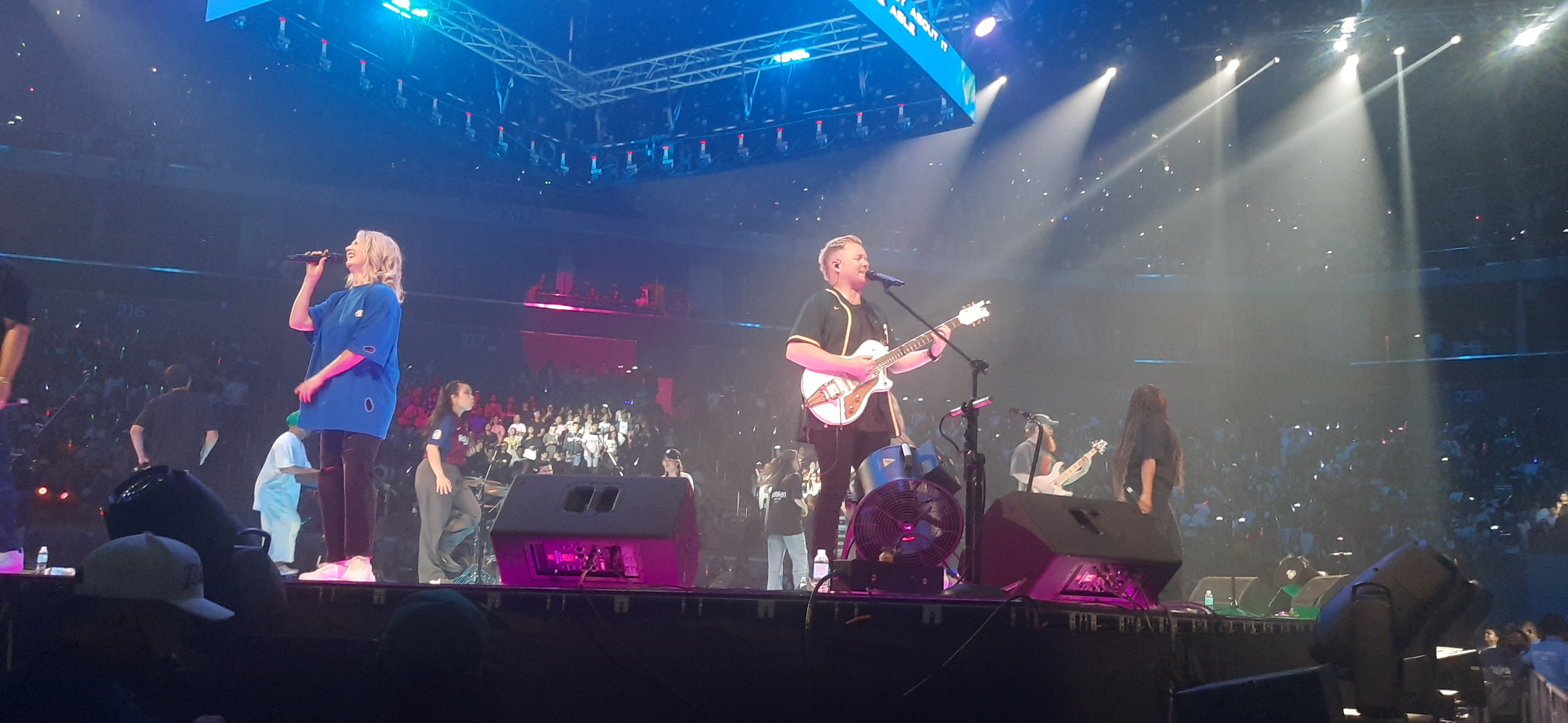
Planetshakers performs "I Know You Can" on the second day of their Show Me Your Glory Tour on July 22, 2023, at the Arena.

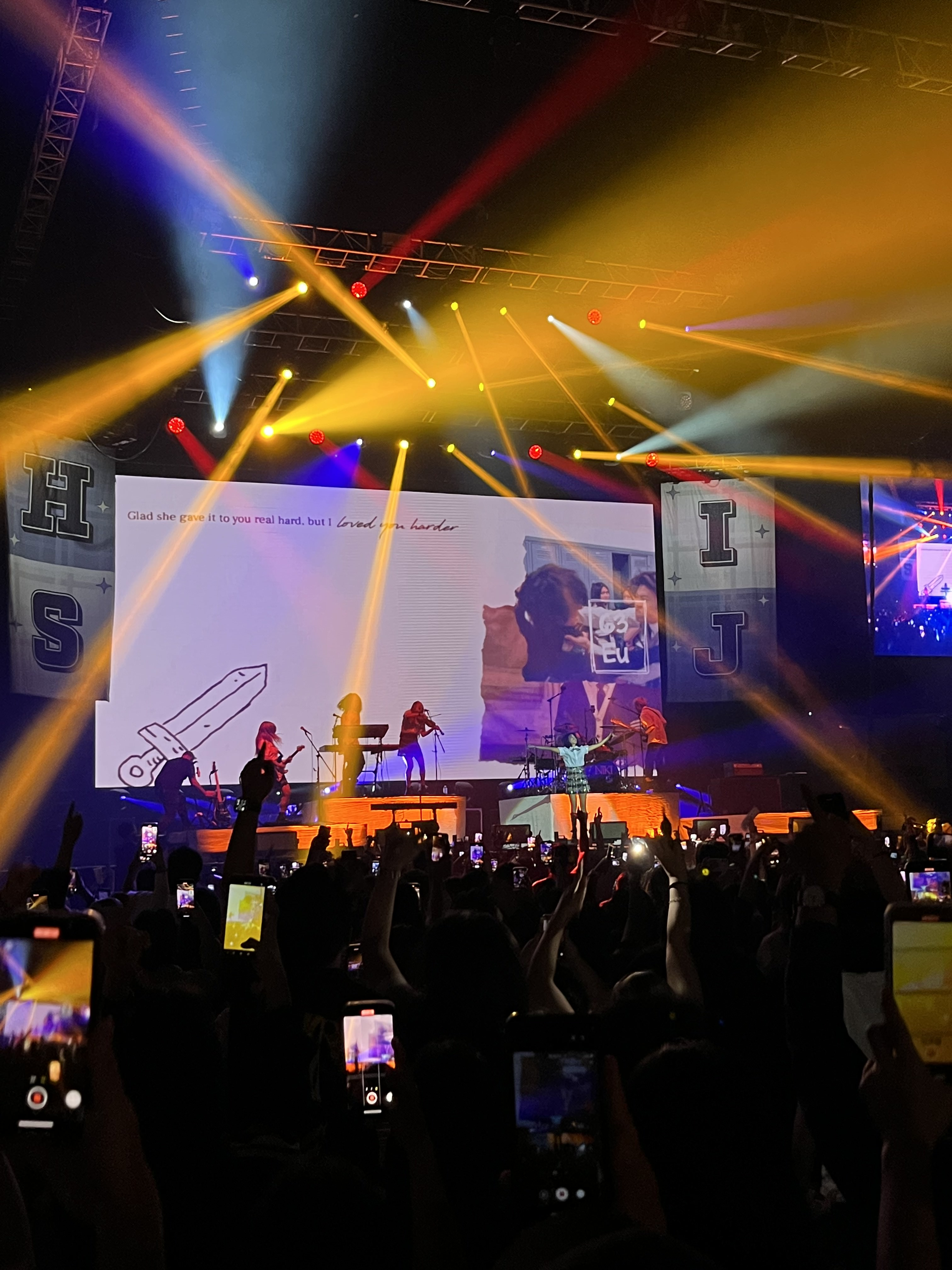
Niki performing at the SM Mall of Asia Arena on September 13, 2023, for the Nicole World Tour. Niki was the first Indonesian artist to perform at the arena.

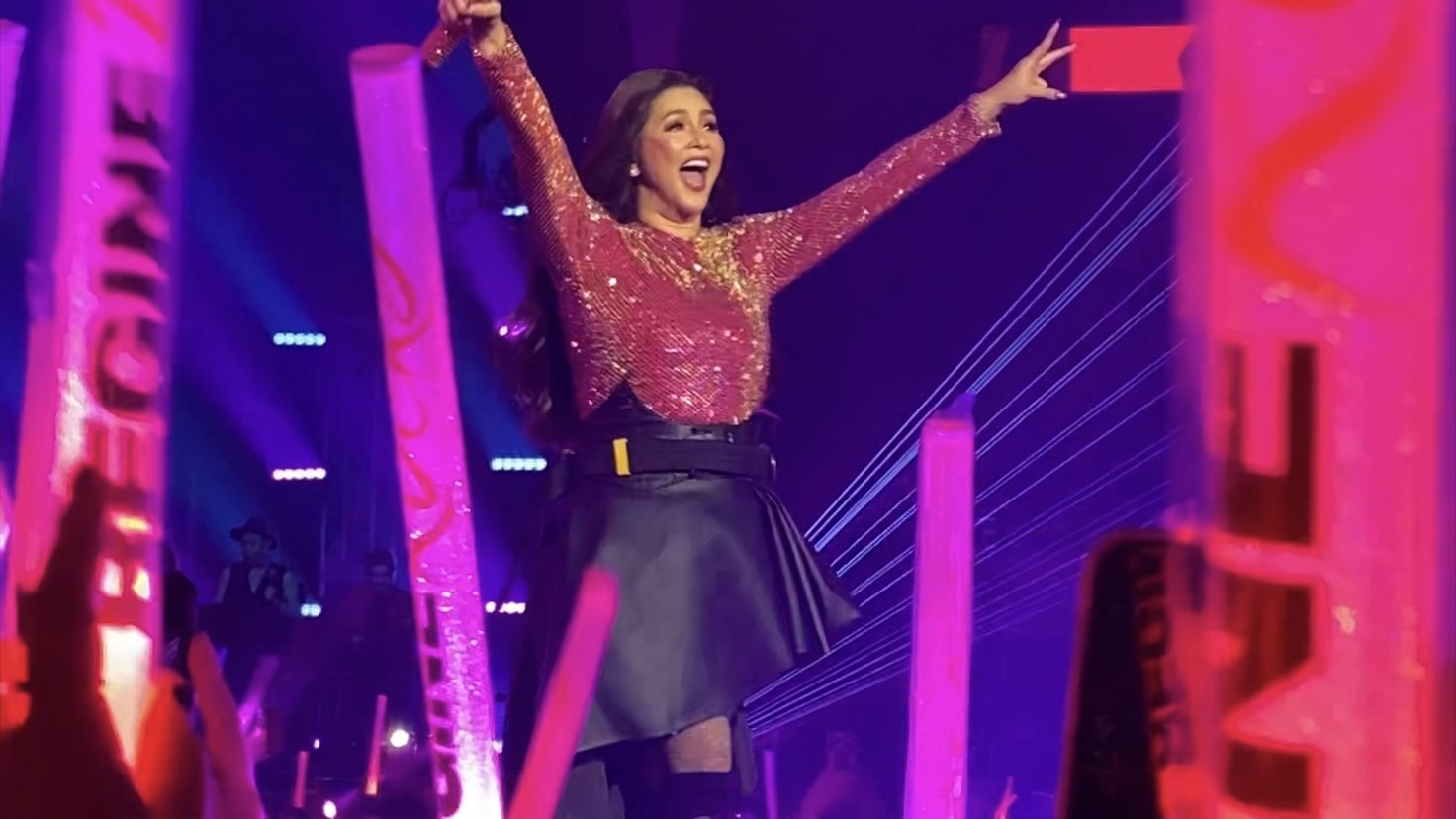
Regine Velasquez performing at the SM Mall of Asia Arena on April 19, 2024, for Regine Rocks: The Repeat.

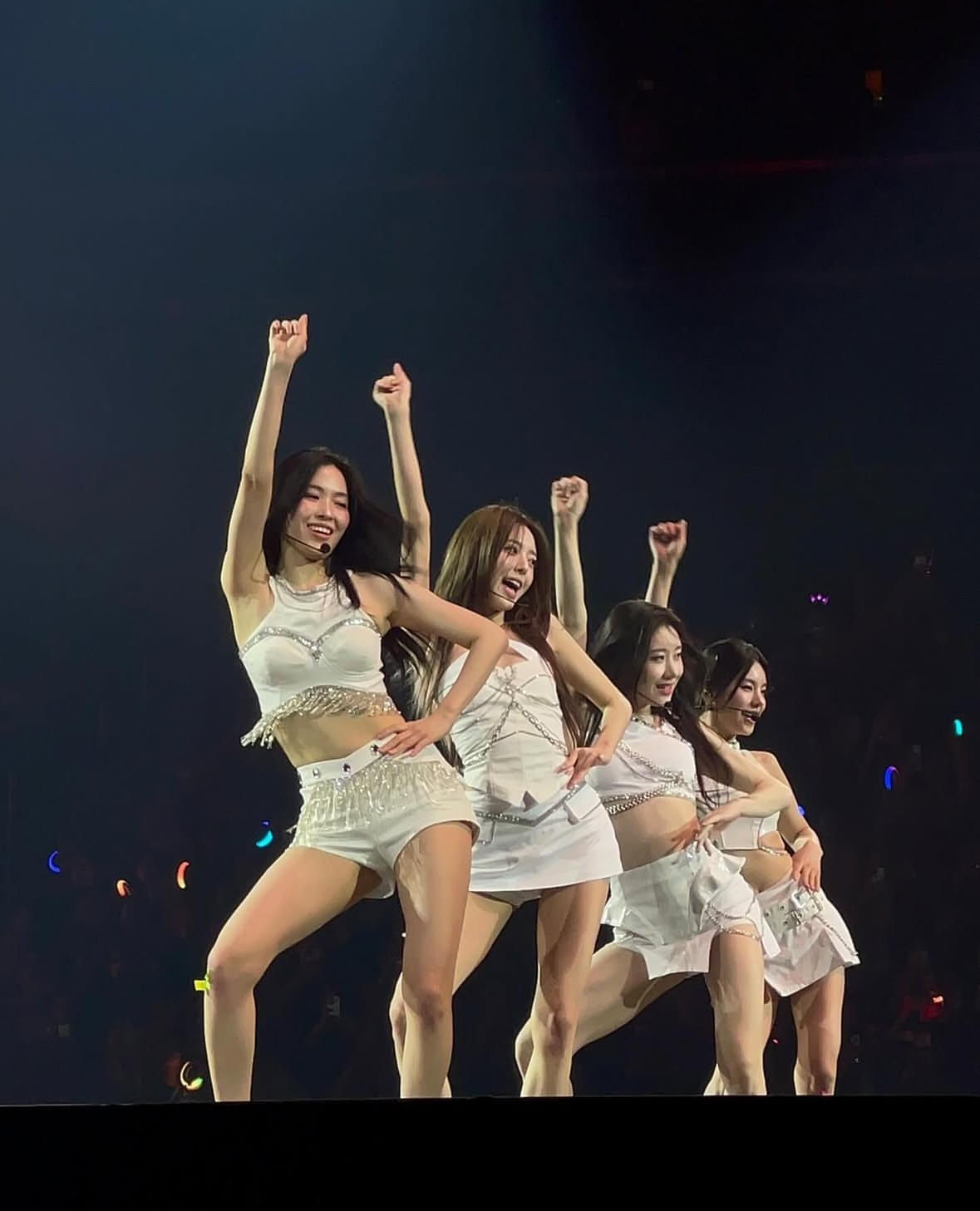
Itzy performing at the arena on August 3, 2024, for their Born to Be World Tour.

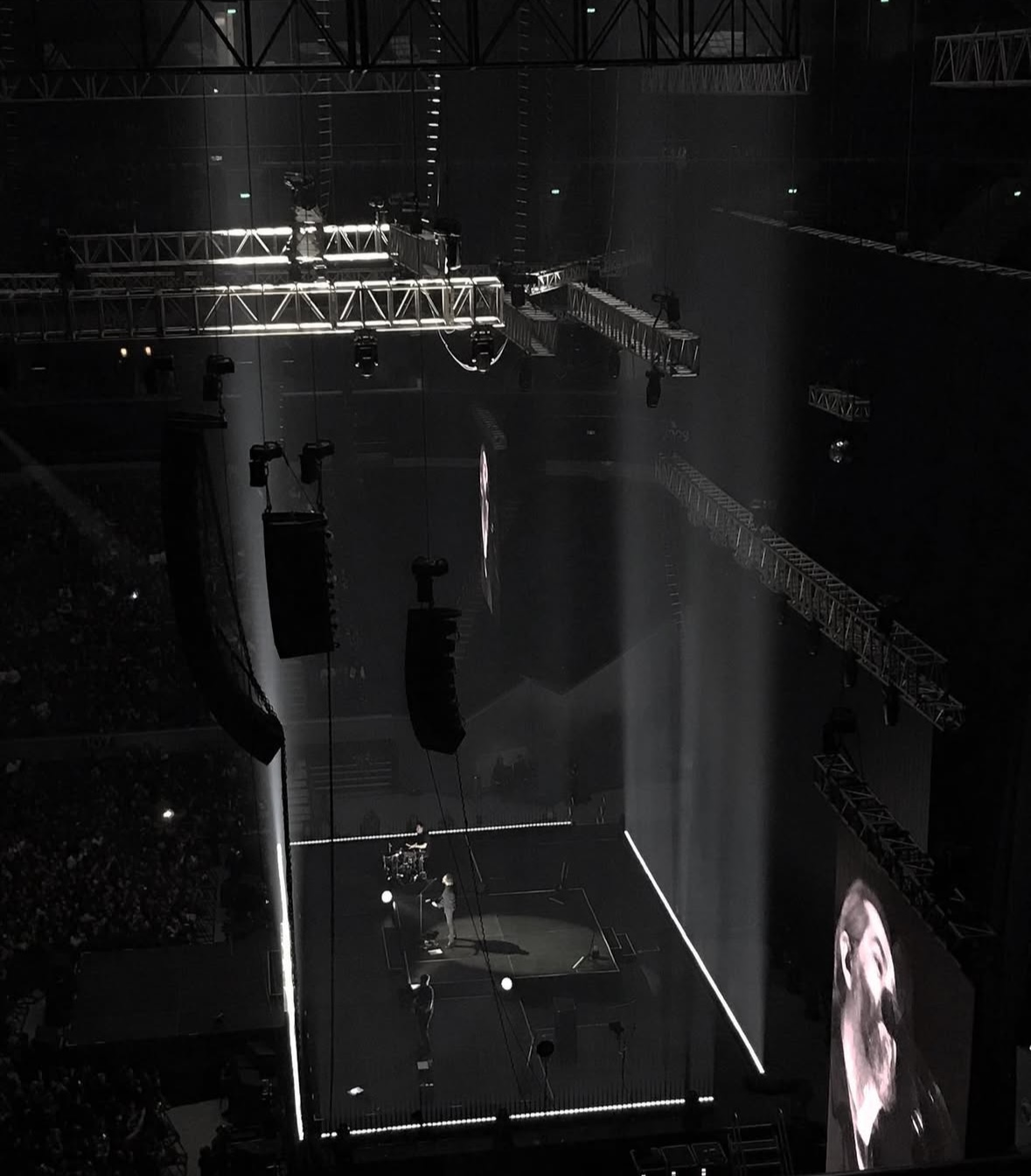
Cigarettes After Sex performing at the SM Mall of Asia Arena on January 14, 2025, as part of the X's World Tour.

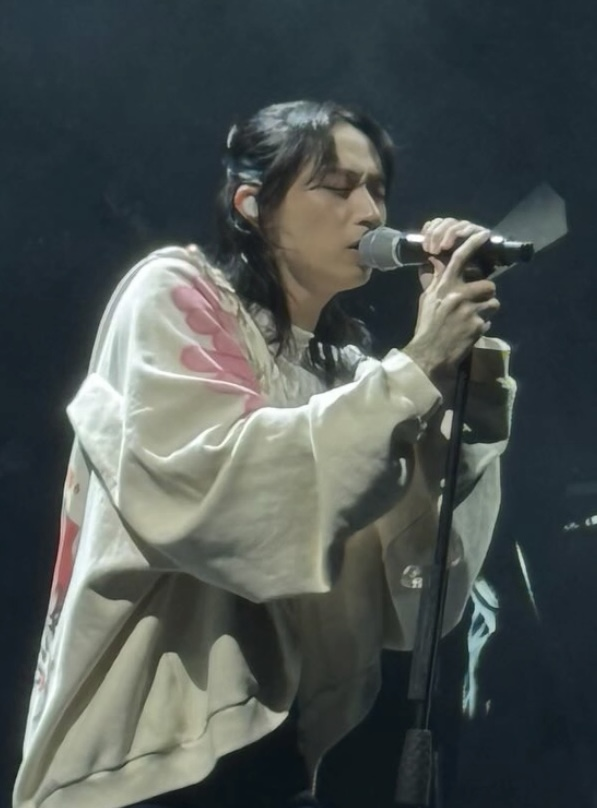
Keshi performing at the arena on March 4, 2025, during his Requiem Tour.

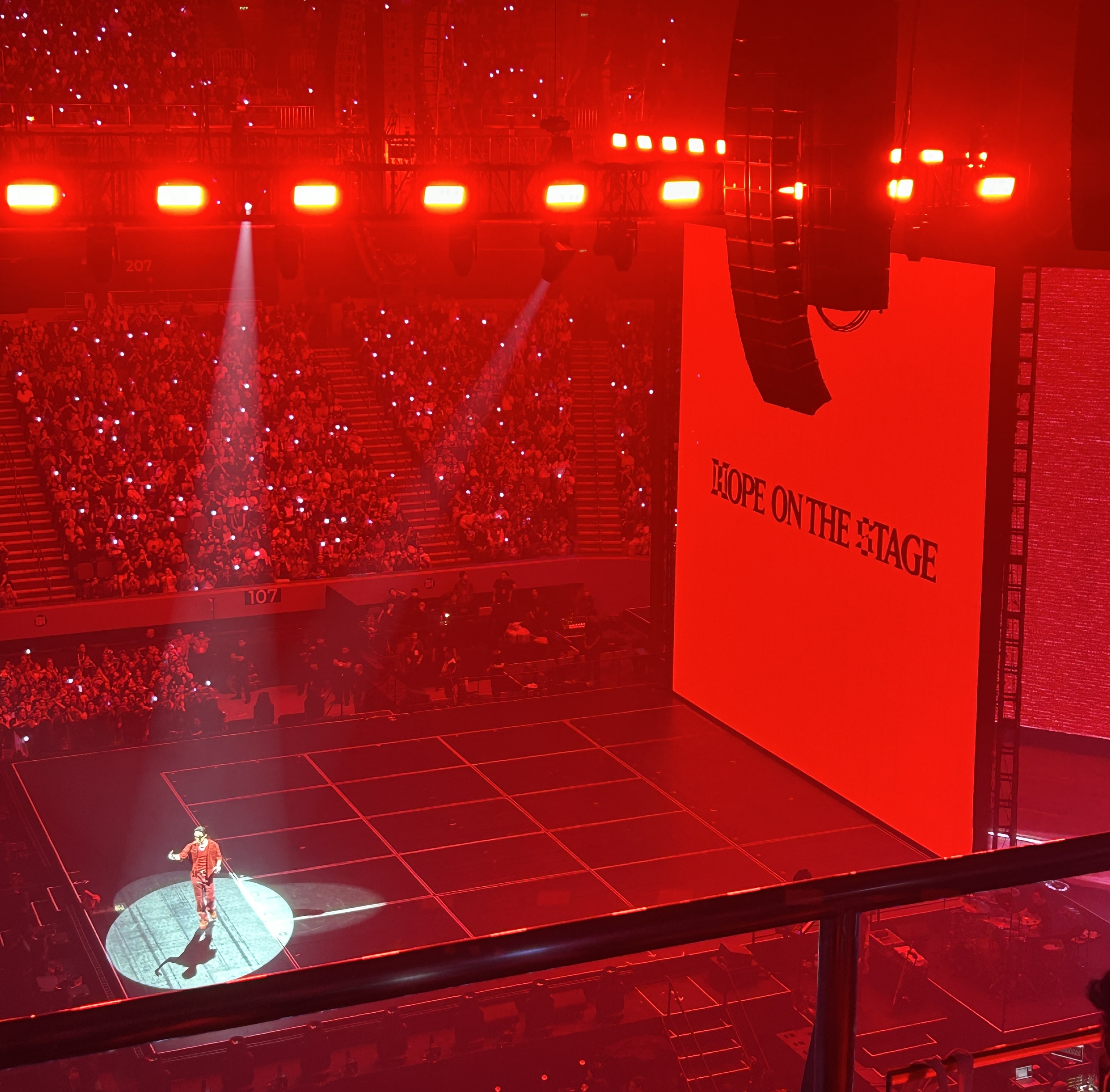
J-Hope's Hope on the Stage at the SM Mall of Asia Arena on April 12, 2025.

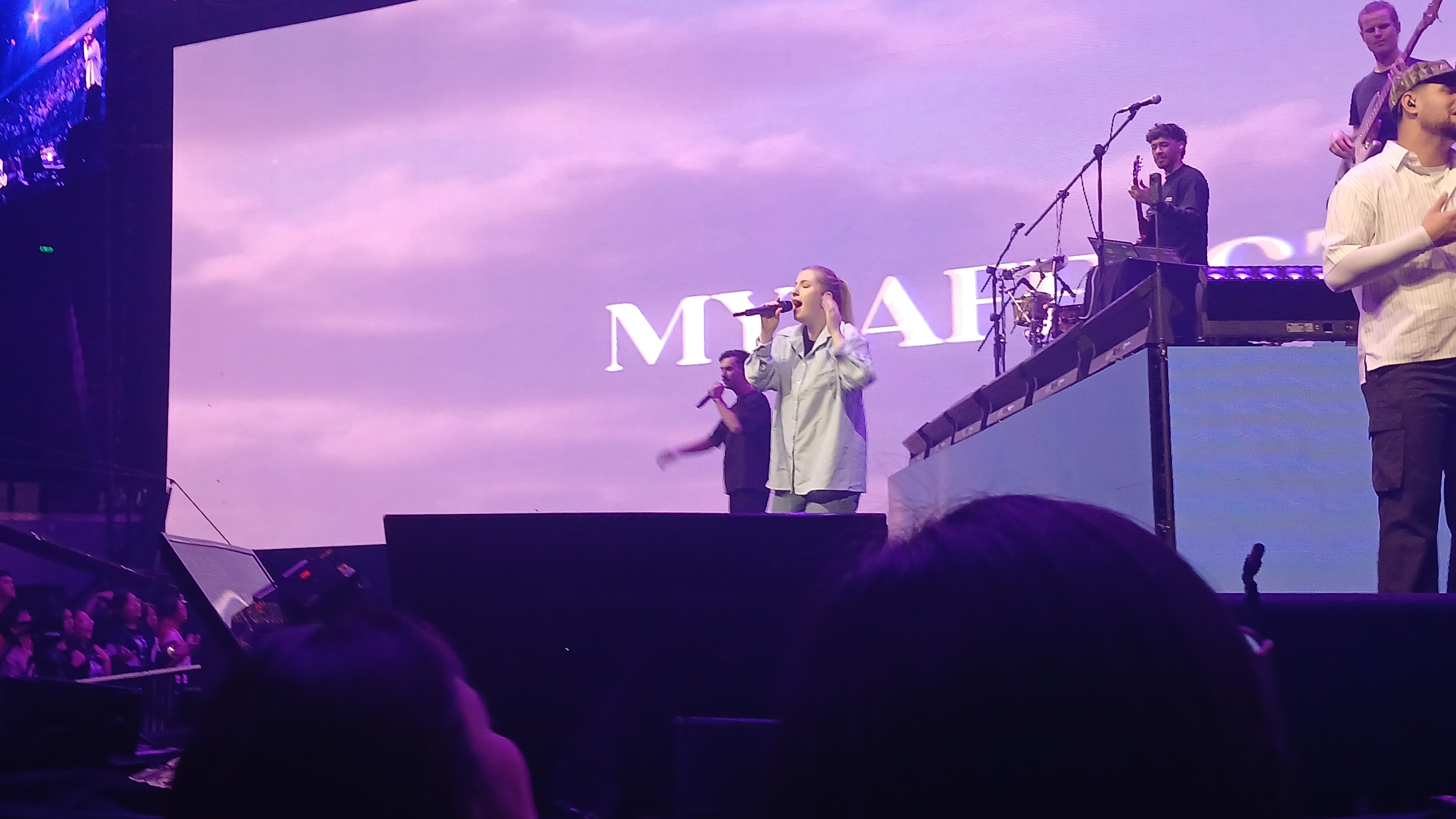
Planetboom's Aimee Evans-Walker performs "Jesus Forever" at the SM Mall of Asia Arena on July 26, 2025.

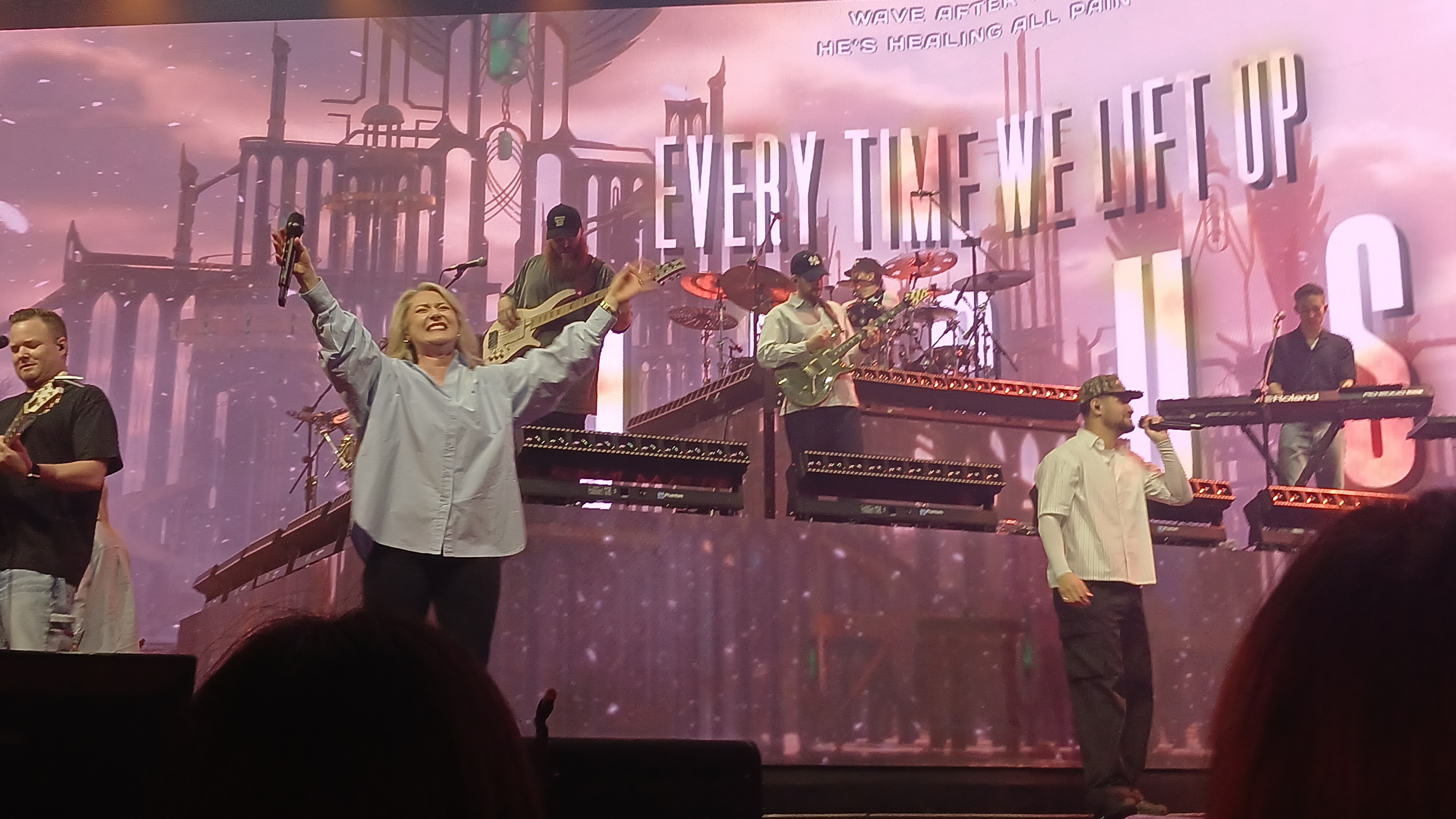
Planetshakers' Samantha Evans (along with Noah Walker) performing for their Abundance Tour at the arena on July 26, 2025.

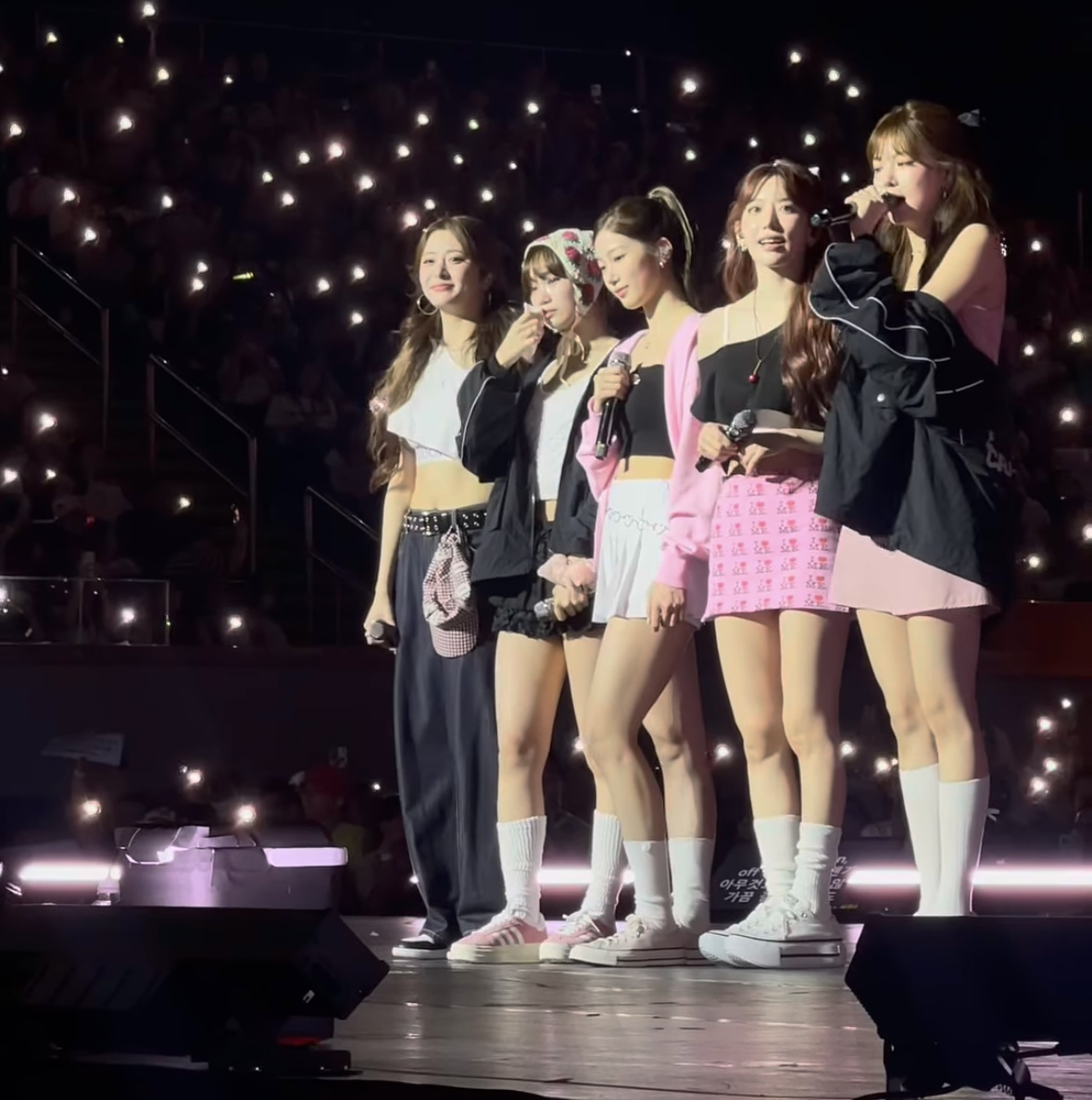
Le Sserafim during their Easy Crazy Hot Tour at the arena on August 2, 2025.

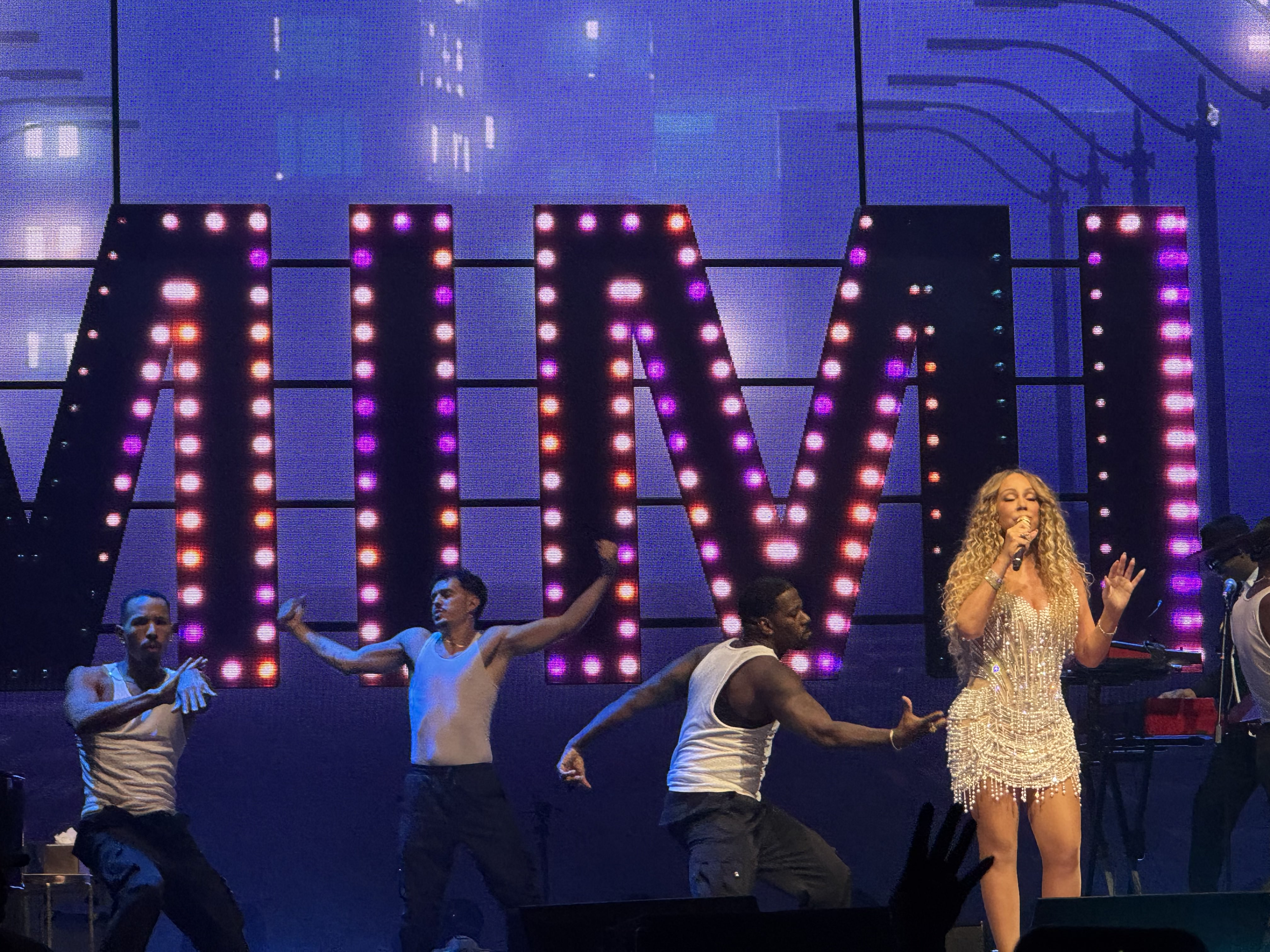
Mariah Carey performing at the SM Mall of Asia Arena on October 14, 2025, as part of The Celebration of Mimi.

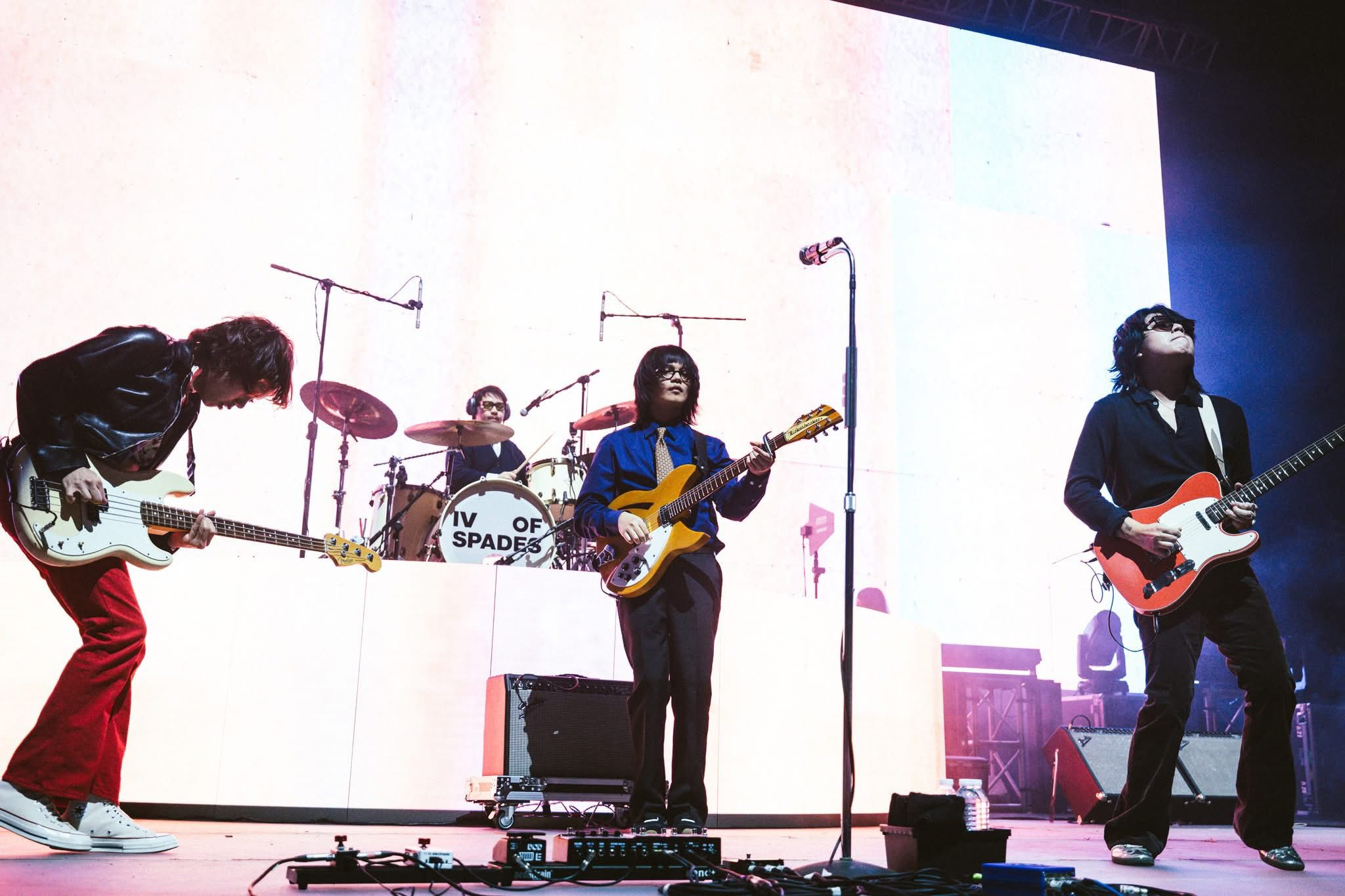
IV of Spades performing at the SM Mall of Asia Arena on December 12, 2025, their first arena headline concert.

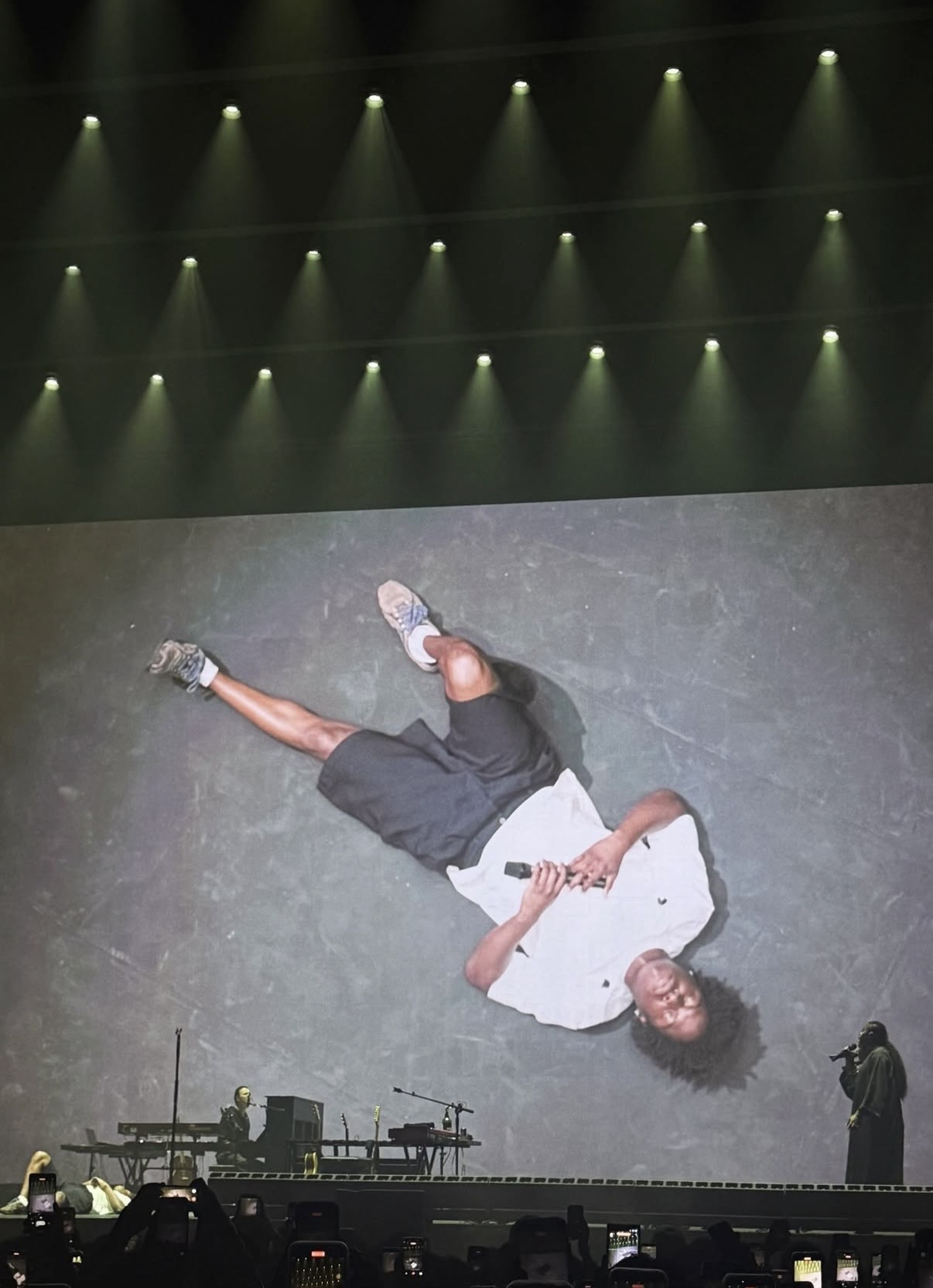
Daniel Caesar performing at the SM Mall of Asia Arena on May 19, 2026, as part of the Son of Spergy Tour.

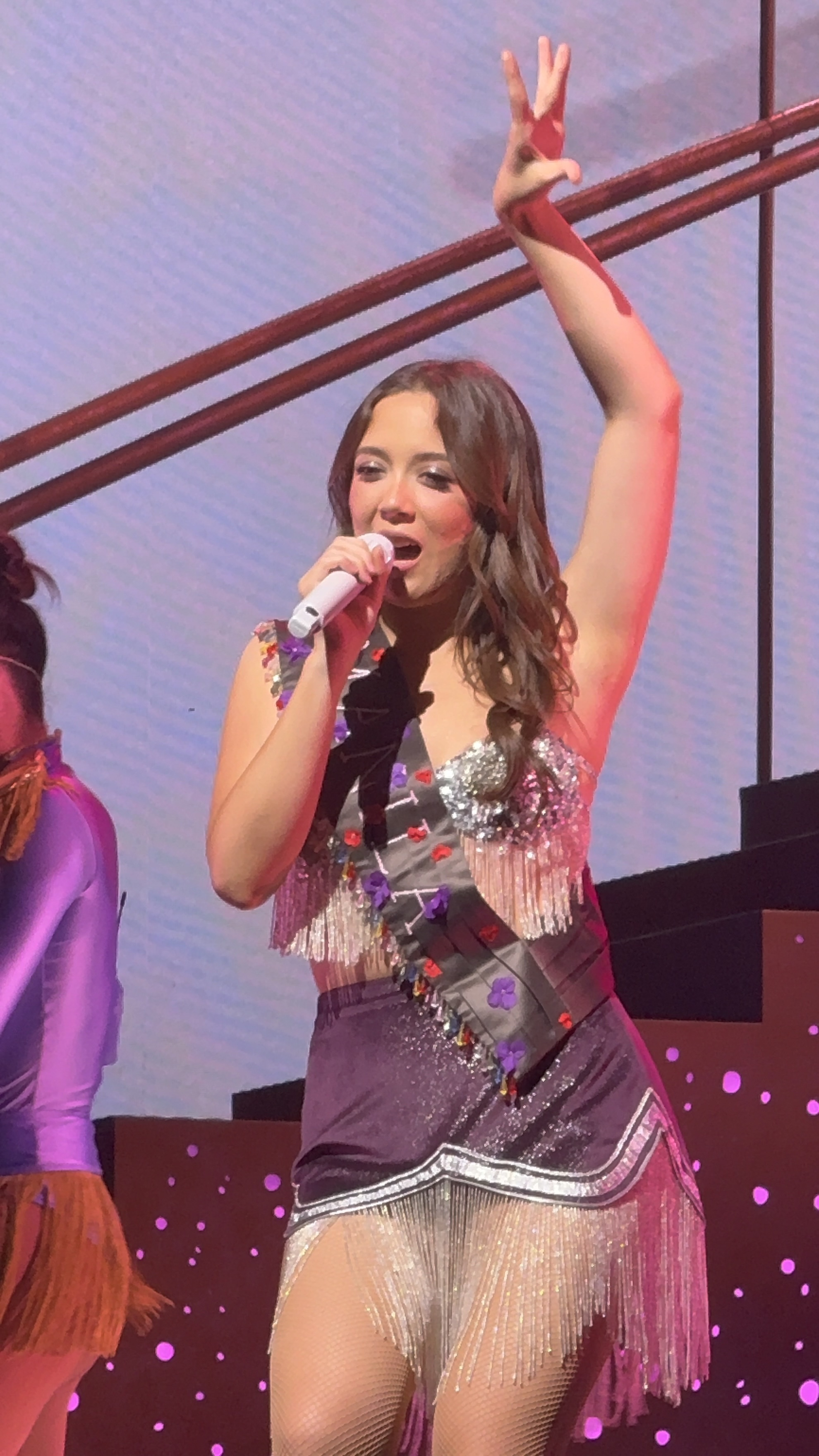
Laufey performing at the SM Mall of Asia Arena on May 26, 2026, as part of her A Matter of Time Tour. Laufey was the first Icelandic artist to perform at the arena.

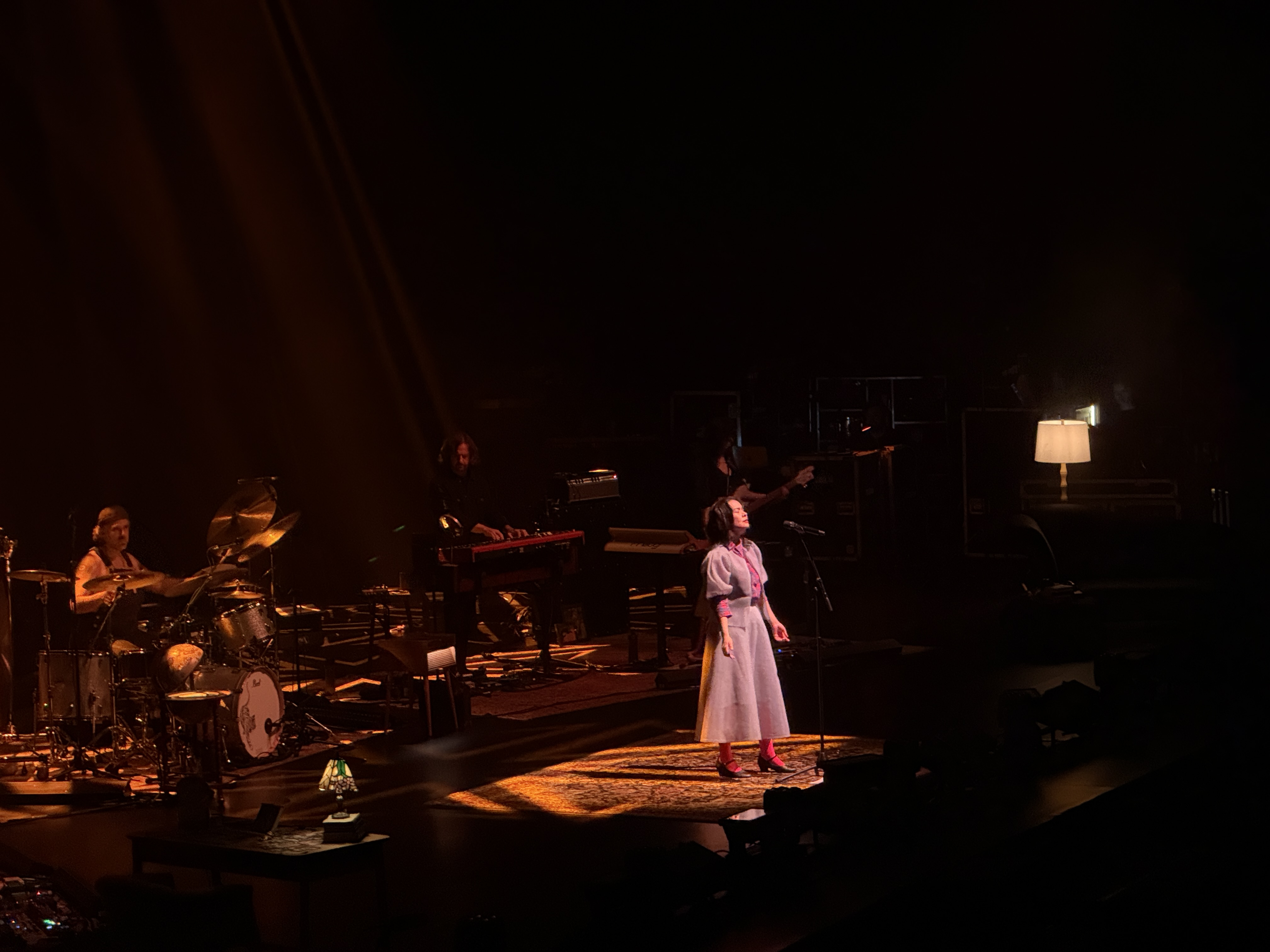
Mitski performing at the SM Mall of Asia Arena on July 14, 2026, as part of her Nothing's About to Happen to Me Live 2026 tour.

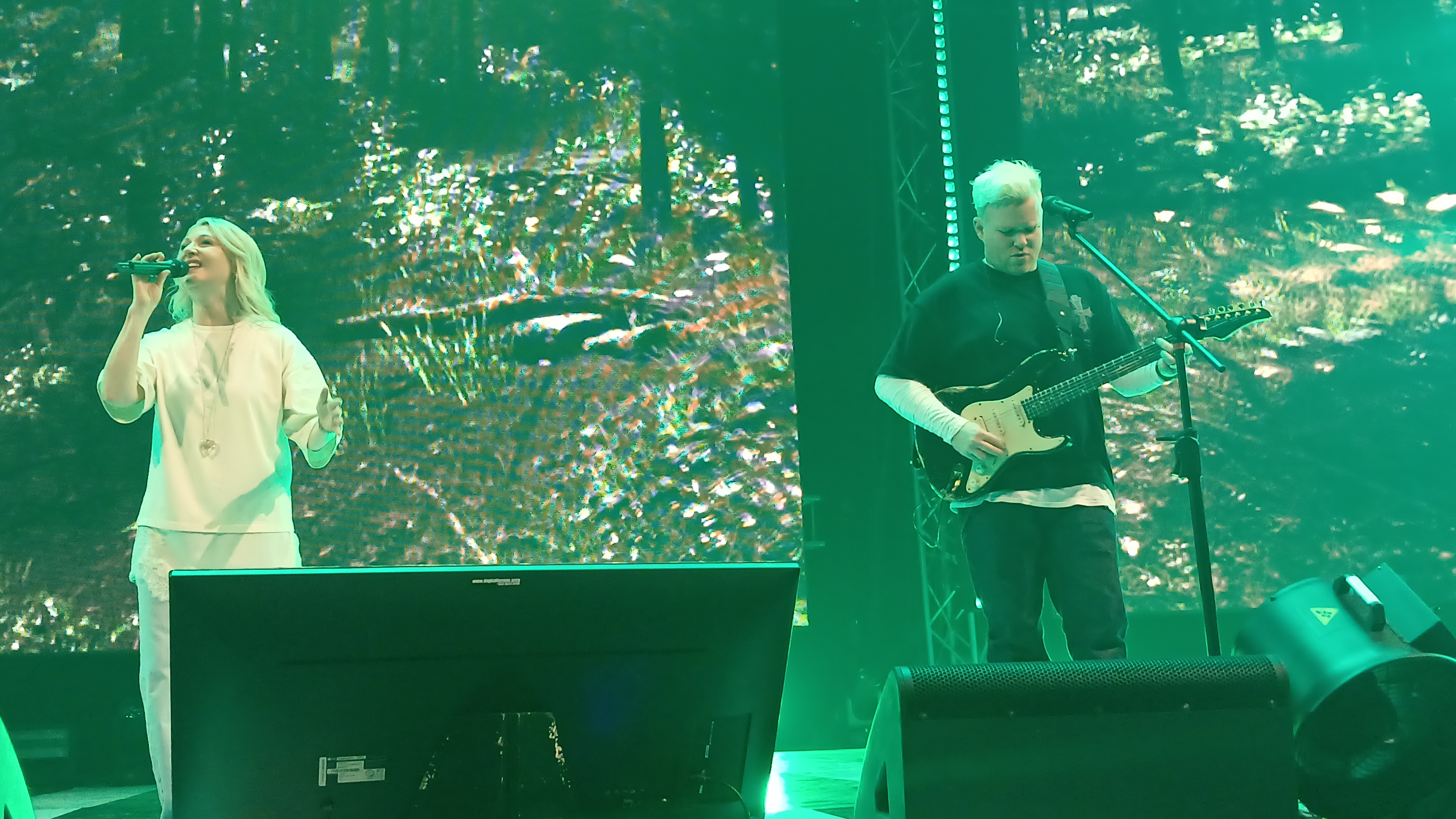
Pastors Sam Evans and Joth Hunt of Planetshakers performing "Speak to Mountains" on July 18, 2026, at the SM Mall of Asia Arena.

This is a list of notable entertainers who have performed within the SM Mall of Asia complex in Pasay, Metro Manila, Philippines, either at the SM Mall of Asia Arena, the Mall of Asia concert grounds, or the SMX Convention Center Manila. The list also includes future scheduled performances at those venues.

Events from local artists
Events from regional (Asian) artists
Events from international artists
Events from both local and international artists

== SM Mall of Asia Arena ==
Entertainment events at the SM Mall of Asia Arena
Date(s)	Headline entertainer(s)	Event
2012
May 21–22	Lady Gaga	Born This Way Ball
June 3	New Kids on the Block; Backstreet Boys	NKOTBSB Tour
June 16	Freddie Aguilar; Ogie Alcasid; Christian Bautista; Wally Bayola; Jose Mari Chan; The Company; Juris Fernandez; Pops Fernandez; Jed Madela; Bamboo Mañalac; Jose Manalo; Martin Nievera; Zsa Zsa Padilla; Jim Paredes; Piolo Pascual; Arnel Pineda; Pokwang; Lea Salonga; Erik Santos; Basil Valdez; Gary Valenciano; Regine Velasquez	ICONS at The Arena
July 11	Nicki Minaj	Pink Friday Tour
August 9	Cirque du Soleil	Saltimbanco
September 13–14	—N/a	Universe: the Bench 25th Anniversary Fashion Show
October 2	Keane	Strangeland Tour
October 12	Wilson Phillips	Wilson Phillips Live in Manila
October 19	Jonas Brothers	Jonas Brothers World Tour 2012/2013
October 24	Big Bang	Alive Galaxy Tour
November 16	Regine Velasquez	Silver
November 26	Jennifer Lopez	Dance Again World Tour
November 30	Ate Gay	Ako Naman!!!
December 15	Various	Rock loQal: i am LoQal, i Rock
2013
January 5	Regine Velasquez	Silver Rewind
January 16	Swedish House Mafia	One Last Tour
February 2	Various	TM Astig Panalo Fest Unli-Saya Show
February 14	Regine Velasquez; Martin Nievera; Pops Fernandez; Ogie Alcasid	Foursome
February 15	Paramore	The Self-Titled Tour
February 16	Psy	Psy(chedelic)
February 24	Various	Himig Handog P-Pop Love Songs: Mga Awit at Kwento ng Pusong Pilipino
March 2	2PM	What Time Is It: 2PM Live Tour in Manila
March 16	Regine Velasquez; Martin Nievera; Pops Fernandez; Ogie Alcasid	Foursome ... the Repeat!
May 3	Modern English, The Alarm	Back To The 80's - New Wave Concert Party
May 8	Aerosmith	Global Warming Tour
May 11	Kamikazee; Urbandub; Franco; Moonstar88; Rocksteddy; Save Me Hollywood; The Chongkeys	Vans Summer Music Jam
May 15	Avicii	Avicii: World Tour
May 19	—N/a	Miss Philippines Earth 2013
July 6	Lee Min-ho	My Everything: World Tour
August 13	Linkin Park	Living Things World Tour
August 16	Ogie Alcasid	I Write Songs ... The 25th Anniversary Celebration
September 4	Pitbull	Planet Pit World Tour
September 19	Rihanna	Diamonds World Tour
October 2–6	Disney Live: Mickey's Magic Show	
October 24	Super Junior	Super Show 5
November 25	Alicia Keys	Set the World on Fire Tour
November 30	Sarah Geronimo	Perfect 10: The Repeat
2014
January 31	Various	Heal Our Land: Stars coming together for the benefit of Typhoon Yolanda victims
February 14	Regine Velasquez, Martin Nievera	Voices of Love
March 16	Macklemore & Ryan Lewis	World Tour 2014
March 22	Bruno Mars	Moonshine Jungle Tour
May 11	—N/a	Miss Philippines Earth 2014
May 17	2NE1	All or Nothing World Tour
May 30	Armin van Buuren	Armin Only: Intense
June 6	Taylor Swift	The Red Tour
August 2	Gary Valenciano	Arise Gary V 3.0: The Repeat
September 10–14	Disney Live: Three Classic Fairy Tales	
October 1	Hardwell	Go Hardwell or Go Home
October 3	Toni Gonzaga	Celestine
October 12	—N/a	Miss World Philippines 2014
October 28	Mariah Carey	The Elusive Chanteuse Show
October 31	Mr. Big	Mr. Big Live in Manila
November 17	Tommy Walker	Living in the Wonder
December 7	BTS	2014 BTS Live Trilogy Episode II: The Red Bullet in Manila
December 13	Julie Anne San Jose	Hologram
2015
January 24	The 1975	The 1975 Tour
January 31	Michael Bublé	To Be Loved Tour
February 1	The Vamps	The Vamps Asia-Pacific 2015 Tour
February 13	Regine Velasquez; Martin Nievera; Lani Misalucha; Gary Valenciano	Ultimate
February 14	Regine Velasquez; Martin Nievera; Lani Misalucha; Gary Valenciano	Ultimate
March 12	Ed Sheeran	X Tour
March 13	Incubus, Lindsey Stirling	Incubus Live in Manila 2015; Lindsey Stirling 2014–2015 Tour
March 19	Various	Songs for Heroes: A Fundraising Concert For the Benefit of the Families of SAF 44
April 10	Hillsong Worship	No Other Name Tour
April 17	The Script	No Sound Without Silence Tour
April 30	Demi Lovato	Demi World Tour
May 2	VIXX	Live Fantasia in Manila Utopia Tour
May 5	Backstreet Boys	In a World Like This Tour
May 29	Darren Espanto	D'Birthday Concert
May 31	—N/a	Miss Philippines Earth 2015
June 7	Idina Menzel	Idina Menzel: World Tour
June 13	Daniel Padilla	DJP: Most Wanted
June 20–21	Monster Jam Philippines 2015	
June 30	The 5th Gen; Wency Cornejo; Jenine Desiderio; Gwyneth Dorado; Gerphil Flores; Jeffrey Hidalgo; Kuh Ledesma; Jed Madela; Sam Shoaf	Songs for Heroes 2: Ang Mamatay Nang Dahil Sa Iyo
July 21	Chris Brown	X Tour
July 30	Big Bang	Made World Tour
August 8	Zedd	True Colors Tour
August 12	All Time Low, The Maine	All Time Low Live in Manila 2015
August 23	Ariana Grande	The Honeymoon Tour
August 27	Imagine Dragons	Smoke + Mirrors Tour
September 17	Maroon 5	Maroon V Tour
September 21	Spandau Ballet	Soulboys of the Western World Live
October 8	Lifehouse	Lifehouse live in Manila 2015
November 7	Infinite	Infinite Effect World Tour
November 13	Maja Salvador	Majasty
November 21	Sam Smith	In the Lonely Hour Tour
2016
January 19	One Ok Rock	2016 35xxxv Asia Tour
January 23–24	Exo	Exo Planet 2 – The Exo'luxion
January 30	The Vamps, Before You Exit, The Tide	3LOGY in Manila
February 13	Regine Velasquez; Martin Nievera; Erik Santos; Angeline Quinto	Royals
February 24	Madonna	Rebel Heart Tour
February 25	Madonna	Rebel Heart Tour
March 12	5 Seconds of Summer	Sounds Live Feels Live World Tour
April 26	Andrea Bocelli	Cinema World Tour
May 22	—N/a	Pilipinas Got Talent Season 5: The Final Showdown
May 27	Jason Derulo, Redfoo	Jason Derulo Live in Manila
June 18–19	Monster Jam Philippines 2016	
July 30	BTS	2016 BTS LIVE "The Most Beautiful Moment in Life on Stage: Epilogue"
July 31	Selena Gomez	Revival Tour
August 18	The 1975; James Bay; Panic! at the Disco; Third Eye Blind; Elle King; Twin Pines	In the Mix 2016
August 19	The Chainsmokers	The Chainsmokers Live in Manila
September 3	Gugudan; KNK; Sonamoo; ASTRO; M&D; AOA; VIXX; B.A.P. BTS	Show Champion
September 9	Big Show; Charlotte Flair; Chris Jericho; Gallows and Anderson; John Cena; Kevin Owens; The New Day; Roman Reigns; Sami Zayn; Sasha Banks; Seth Rollins; The Shining Stars	WWE Live Manila
September 17	Fedde le Grand; Moti; Jauz; Alesso; Tiësto	Road to Ultra: Philippines
October 29	—N/a	Miss Earth 2016
November 11	The Calling	Alex Band, The Calling Live in Manila
November 17	Fat Joe	Fat Joe Live in Manila
November 25	Armin van Buuren	Armin Only: Embrace
December 25–30	The Wonderful World of Disney on Ice	
2017
January 1–4	The Wonderful World of Disney on Ice	
January 30	Miss Universe Organization	Miss Universe 2016
March 2	Psy; Shinee; CNBLUE; B1A4; B.A.P; BtoB; AOA	One Korea Global Peace Concert
March 18	Shawn Mendes	Shawn Mendes World Tour
March 22	Christian Bautista; KC Concepcion; Sam Concepcion; Morissette; Lea Salonga; Aicelle Santos; Erik Santos; Tippy Dos Santos; Julie Anne San Jose; Janina Vela	Disney Princess: I Dare to Dream Concert
March 31	Morissette; Klarisse de Guzman; Jona Viray; Angeline Quinto	ASAP Birit Queens
April 5	Fifth Harmony	The 7/27 Tour
May 6–7	BTS	2017 BTS Live Trilogy Episode III: The Wings Tour
May 20	Autotelic; Jensen and The Flips; MilesExperience; Reese Lansangan; Sud; Gabby Alipe; Somedaydream; NINNO; She's Only Sixteen; Conscious and the Goodness; An Honest Mistake	Get Music Indie-Go
May 31	G-Force	G-Force Project 2017
June 15	Britney Spears	Britney: Live in Concert
June 23 – July 2	Cirque du Soleil	Toruk - The First Flight
July 15	—N/a	Miss Philippines Earth 2017
August 14	Liam Gallagher	Liam Gallagher of Oasis Live in Manila
August 17	5 Seconds of Summer; Zara Larsson; Two Door Cinema Club; DNCE; Daya; Dua Lipa	In the Mix 2017
August 21	Ariana Grande	Dangerous Woman Tour
August 22	All Time Low	The Young Renegades Tour
September 3	—N/a	Miss World Philippines 2017
September 13	The Chainsmokers	Memories Do Not Open Tour
September 30	Eat Bulaga	Miss Millennial Philippines 2017 Grand Coronation Day
October 6	Seventeen	Diamond Edge World Tour
October 21	Regine Velasquez	R3.0
October 31	Chacha Cañete; Bo Cerrudo; Aia De Leon; Ney Dimaculagan; Jason Dy; Darren Espanto; The KNC Kids; Kris Lawrence; Mela; Jett Pangan; Leah Patricio; Plethora; Richard Reynoso; Jamie Rivera; Wish 107.5's Wishcovery's Wishful 20	Songs for Heroes 3: Bayani ng Marawi
November 4	—N/a	Miss Earth 2017
November 18	—N/a	Under the Stars: the Bench 30th Anniversary Fashion Show
December 25–30	The Wonderful World of Disney on Ice: Everyone's Story	
2018
January 1–3	The Wonderful World of Disney on Ice: Everyone's Story	
January 29	One Ok Rock	Ambitions Tour
February 10	Regine Velasquez; Martin Nievera; Ogie Alcasid; Erik Santos	#paMORE
February 18	Paramore	Tour Four
April 2	Katy Perry	Witness: The Tour
April 14	The Script	Freedom Child Tour
April 28	Exo	EXO PLANET #4 – The EℓyXiOn
May 1	Harry Styles	Harry Styles: Live on Tour
May 3–4	Bruno Mars	24K Magic World Tour
May 19	—N/a	Miss Earth Philippines 2018
June 10	Niall Horan	Flicker World Tour
June 22	KZ Tandingan	Supreme
June 30	Super Junior	Super Show 7
July 19–20	Celine Dion	Celine Dion Live 2018
September 1	Wanna One	One: The World
September 14	Dua Lipa	The Self-Titled Tour
September 22	Erik Santos	My Greatest Moments
September 29	Seventeen	2018 Seventeen Concert 'Ideal Cut'
October 7	—N/a	Miss World Philippines 2018
October 20	Panic! At The Disco	Pray for the Wicked Tour
October 25	Kygo	Kids in Love Tour
October 28	Weki Meki; The Boyz; MXM; Xeno-T; Exo; VIXX; Hyeongseop X Euiwoong	Show Champion
November 3	—N/a	Miss Earth 2018
November 10	Winner	Winner Everywhere Tour
November 11	iKon	iKon 2018 Continue Tour
2019
January 19	Seungri	The Great Seungri
January 26	—N/a	Miss Intercontinental 2018
February 2	Blackpink	In Your Area World Tour
March 7	NCT Dream, April, Noir	2019 KPop Friendship Concert in Manila
May 1	Troye Sivan	The Bloom Tour
June 9	Red Velvet; NCT 127; Elris; Kim Dong-han; Sohee	2019 K-Pop World Music Festival
June 29	Twice	Twicelights World Tour
July 23–25	LANY	Malibu Nights Tour
August 24	Exo	Exo Planet 5 – Exploration
September 11	The 1975	Music for Cars Tour
October 26	Got7	Keep Spinning Tour
October 28	Backstreet Boys	DNA World Tour
December 15	Super Junior	Super Show 8 - "Infinite Time"
December 21–31	Disney on Ice: Live Your Dreams	
2020
January 1–5	Disney on Ice: Live Your Dreams	
January 15	Jo Koy	Just Kidding World Tour
January 25	Winner	Winner Cross Tour
February 8	Seventeen	Ode to You World Tour
2022
April 30	—N/a	Miss Universe Philippines 2022
June 5	—N/a	Miss World Philippines 2022
June 10	Kim Soo-hyun	One ExtraOrdinary Day Fan Meeting
June 26	Rowoon	Rowoon Live Fan Meeting in Manila
July 15	1st.One; Alamat; BGYO; BINI; LITZ; MNL48; PPop Generation; Press Hit Play; VXON	Tugatog: Filipino Music Festival
July 22	Red Velvet; BGYO; BINI; Lady Pipay	BE YOU: The World Will Adjust
August 13	Billie Eilish	Happier Than Ever, The World Tour
August 15	All Time Low; Chicosi	Live in Manila
August 31	Jo Koy	Funny Is Funny Tour
September 4	NCT 127	Neo City - The Link
September 8–11	Planetshakers	Greater Asia Tour 2022: Manila/Pasay City
September 23	The Script	The Script: Greatest Hits Tour
September 30	Jessi	Zoom in Manila
October 8–9	Seventeen	Be The Sun World Tour
October 22	KinnPorsche	KinnPorsche The Series World Tour 2022
October 27–28	Tomorrow X Together	Act: Lovesick
October 29	CL; Epik High; Pentagon; Kard; Gaho × Kave; BGYO; DJ Soda; Minty Fresh; Lady Morgana; Lady Gagita	Hallyuween: Philippines' 1st KPOP Halloween Party
November 5	Russ	The Journey is Everything World Tour
November 6	Ji Chang-wook	Ji Chang-wook Reach You in Manila
November 11–13, 15–16	LANY	A November to Remember Tour
November 26	Everglow, Momoland, AKMU	Ripples for Hope
December 17–18	Super Junior	Super Show 9: Road
2023
January 14–15	Itzy	Checkmate World Tour
January 20	Stray Kids	BENCH X Stray Kids Fanmeet
January 22	Kim Seon-ho	One, Two, Three, Smile! 2023 Kim Seon-ho Asia Tour
January 28	Choi Min-ho	2023 Best Choi's Minho Lucky Choi's in Manila
February 3–5	Enhypen	Manifesto
February 17	The Vamps	The Vamps — Greatest Hits Tour
February 18	Conan Gray	Superache Tour
February 20	Backstreet Boys	DNA World Tour
March 11–12	Stray Kids	Maniac World Tour
April 1	Running Man	2023 Running Man: A Decade of Laughter
April 14–15	Treasure	2023 Treasure Tour Hello in Manila
April 16	Itzy	Itzy Wannabe with Bench Fan Meeting
April 29–30	NCT Dream	The Dream Show 2: In A Dream
May 3–4	The 1975, Wallice	At Their Very Best
May 7	Red Velvet	R to V
May 13	—N/a	Miss Universe Philippines 2023
May 16	Gary Valenciano; December Avenue; El Gamma Penumbra; Parokya ni Edgar; Zack Tabudlo	Roar as One
May 21	Various Star Magic artists	Star Magic All-Star Games 2023
June 24	NCT DoJaeJung	Scented Symphony: Fancon in Manila
July 13	—N/a	Miss Grand Philippines 2023
July 21–23	Planetshakers; Planetboom	Planetshakers Manila Tour 2023: Show Me Your Glory Tour
August 1–2	Alanis Morissette	World Tour: 25 Years of Jagged Little Pill
August 6	Sarah Geronimo; Ely Buendia; Sandara Park; Donny Pangilinan; Belle Mariano; Ben&Ben; Sponge Cola; Mayonnaise; December Avenue; Zack Tabudlo; SunKissed Lola	Acer Day Concert 2023
September 11	Lauv	The All 4 Nothing Tour
September 13	Niki	Nicole World Tour
September 18	Post Malone	If Y'all Weren't Here, I'd Be Crying Tour
October 6	Erik Santos	MilEStone: The 20th Anniversary Concert
October 8	Ahn Hyo-seop	Here and Now: Ahn Hyo-seop Asia Fan Meet
October 21	Sam Smith	Gloria the Tour
October 27	Sharon Cuneta; Gabby Concepcion	Dear Heart
November 11	Lee Jun-ho	Junho: The Moment
November 25	Regine Velasquez	Regine Rocks
November 27	Daryl Hall	Daryl Hall and the Daryl's House Band
2024
January 1–7	Disney on Ice: 100 Years of Wonder	
February 22	Jonas Brothers	Five Albums. One Night. The World Tour
February 27–28	Tabernacle Choir; Lea Salonga; Ysabelle Cuevas; Suzy Entrata-Abrera; Paolo Abrera	Hope
March 4	B.I	Privé Alliance meets B.I
March 16	Cha Eun-woo	Mystery Elevator
April 7	BtoB	Our Dream
April 8	James Taylor	An Evening with James Taylor
April 19	Regine Velasquez	Regine Rocks: The Repeat
April 26–27	Gary Valenciano	Pure Energy: One Last Time
May 4	Treasure	Treasure Tour: Reboot
May 13	Niall Horan	The Show: Live on Tour
May 22	—N/a	Miss Universe Philippines 2024
June 1	Twice	TWICE x Oishi Snacktacular Fan meet
July 13	Ive	Show What I Have World Tour
July 19	—N/a	Miss World Philippines 2024
August 3	Itzy	Born to Be World Tour
August 10–11	NCT Dream	The Dream Show 3: Dream( )scape
August 18	Alamat; G22; Hori7on; KAIA; SB19	Watsons Playlist: The P-pop Power Concert
August 25	The Boyz	The Boyz World Tour: Zeneration II
August 30	December Avenue	Sa Ilalim ng mga Bituin: December Avenue 15th Anniversary Concert
September 2	Laufey	Bewitched Tour
September 14	Red Velvet	Happiness: My Dear, ReVe1uv
October 12	Zerobaseone	The First Tour
November 10	Hillsong London	Hillsong London Live
November 16–17	2NE1	Welcome Back Tour
December 10	Fujii Kaze	Best of Fujii Kaze 2020-2024 Asia Tour
December 21–23, 25–30	Disney on Ice: Find Your Hero	
2025
January 1–5	Disney on Ice: Find Your Hero	
January 14	Cigarettes After Sex	X's World Tour
January 25	Maroon 5	Maroon 5 Asia Tour 2025
February 7	Pops Fernandez; Martin Nievera	Always and Forever
February 11–12	Niki	Buzz World Tour
February 22	Taeyang	The Light Year Tour
February 28	Wave to Earth	Wave to Earth Live
March 4	Keshi	Requiem Tour
March 29	Taeyeon	The Tense
April 12–13	J-Hope	Hope on the Stage Tour
May 2	—N/a	Miss Universe Philippines 2025
May 4	Toto	Dogz of Oz Tour
May 8	Ado	Ado World Tour: Hibana
May 9	Boys Like Girls; The Click Five; Secondhand Serenade	Playback Music Festival
May 30–31	98 Degrees	98° Live in Manila
June 7–8	Reuben Morgan; Ben Fielding; Aodhan King	Mighty to Save Tour
June 21	Jo Koy	Just Being Koy Tour
June 29	Bini	Here for You: The Bini Homecoming Fan Meet
July 25–26	Planetshakers	Abundance Tour
August 2	Le Sserafim	Easy Crazy Hot Tour
August 9	G22; Sarah Geronimo; The Itchyworms; Kamikazee; Maki; Pinoy Big Brother: Celebrity Collab Edition contestants SB19	Acer Day 2025: Break the Limit
August 16	D.O.	Doh Kyung-soo Asia Concert Tour: Do it!
August 16	Park Bo-gum	Be With You
August 24	—N/a	Miss Grand Philippines 2025
August 27	Black Eyed Peas	Black Eyed Peas Live in Manila
October 4	Super Junior	Super Show 10
October 14	Mariah Carey	The Celebration of Mimi
October 27	Babyface; Patti Austin	Greatest Hits Concert
November 7	Ogie Alcasid; Odette Quesada	Q&A
November 8	Jona Viray	Jona: Journey to the Arena
November 16	Hatsune Miku	Miku Expo
November 22	Jason Derulo	Jason Derulo in Manila
December 3	Tyla	We Wanna Party Tour
December 7	Doja Cat	Tour Ma Vie World Tour
December 12–13	IV of Spades	IV of Spades Live at the MOA Arena
December 20–30	Disney on Ice: Magic in the Stars	
2026
January 1–4	Disney on Ice: Magic in the Stars	
January 7	Rico Blanco; Ebe Dancel; Kamikazee; Nina; This Band	Broken Hearts Club
January 17	Riize	Riizing Loud
January 18	Israel Houghton	Israel & New Breed
January 24	Day6	Day6 10th Anniversary Tour "The Decade"
January 31	Bryan Adams	Roll With the Punches Tour
February 3	—N/a	Miss World Philippines 2026
February 6–8	SexBomb Girls	Get, Get, Aw!: The SexBomb Concert (rAWnd 3, rAWnd4, rAWnd 5)
February 13	Gigi de Lana; Freestyle; Neocolours	Stages of Love
February 18	Josh Groban	Gems World Tour
March 4	One Ok Rock	Detox: Asia Tour 2025
March 8	Tomorrow X Together	Wonders at 5:53
April 18	Treasure	Pulse On
April 25	Ive	Show What I Am World Tour
April 30	SexBomb Girls	Get, Get, Aw!: The SexBomb Concert — rAWnd 6
May 1	—N/a	Miss Universe Philippines 2026
May 8	Dashboard Confessional; Faber Drive; Red Jumpsuit Apparatus	Playback Music Festival
May 19–21	Daniel Caesar	Son of Spergy Tour
May 26–28	Laufey	A Matter of Time Tour
June 20–21	Bini	Signals World Tour 2026
July 4–5	Exo	Exo Planet 6 – Exhorizon
July 14	Mitski	Nothing's About to Happen to Me Live 2026
July 17–19	Planetshakers; Planetboom	Live in Manila 2026
July 22	XG	The Core World Tour
August 2	IV of Spades; Arvery Love Lagoring; Kolette Madelo; Kai Montinola; Christian Tibayan	Ikalawang Yugto: Buhay at Pag-ibig
August 10	Kodaline	Farewell Tour
August 20	Rex Orange County	Rex Orange County: Exclusive Asia Show
September 5	Babymonster	Choom World Tour
October 14	Charlie Puth	Whatever's Clever! World Tour
October 17–19	Regine Velasquez	FINALE. The Final Major Solo Concert
October 25	Silent Sanctuary	Gabi ng Lambing
October 27	Jason Mraz	Asia 2026 Tour
November 11–12	5 Seconds of Summer	Everyone's a Star! World Tour
November 15	Wave to Earth	The () Pieces Tour
November 29	5 Seconds of Summer	Everyone's a Star! World Tour
December 5	Le Sserafim	Pureflow Tour
December 12	NCT 127	Neo City – The Redline
December 18–30	Disney on Ice: Let's Dance!	
2027
January 1–3	Disney on Ice: Let's Dance!	
January 20–21	Westlife	The 25th Anniversary World Tour
January 29	Katseye	The Wildworld Tour
February 7	Maroon 5	Maroon 5 Asia 2027 Tour
February 15	Kehlani	Kehlani World Tour
March 18–20	The Script	Man in the Arena Tour
March 29	Toto	Toto 50th Anniversary Tour
April 13	Beabadoobee	The Powerlines Tour
May 25	Disturbed	The Sickness 25th Anniversary Tour
TBA	Moira Dela Torre	Where It All Started

== Mall of Asia concert grounds ==
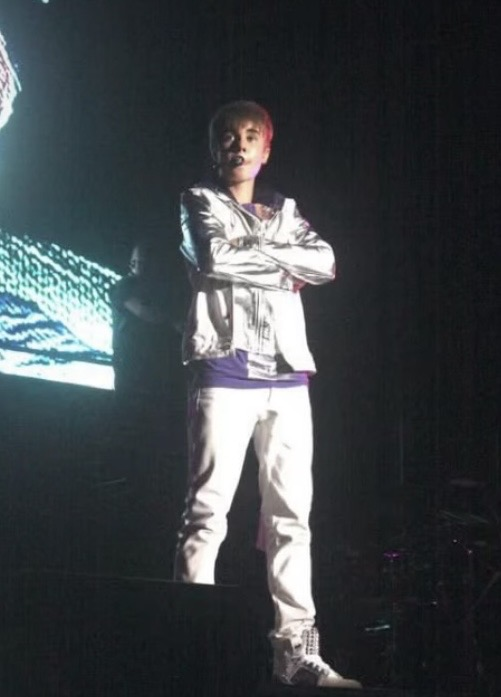
Justin Bieber performing at the Mall of Asia concert grounds on May 10, 2011, as part of the My World Tour.

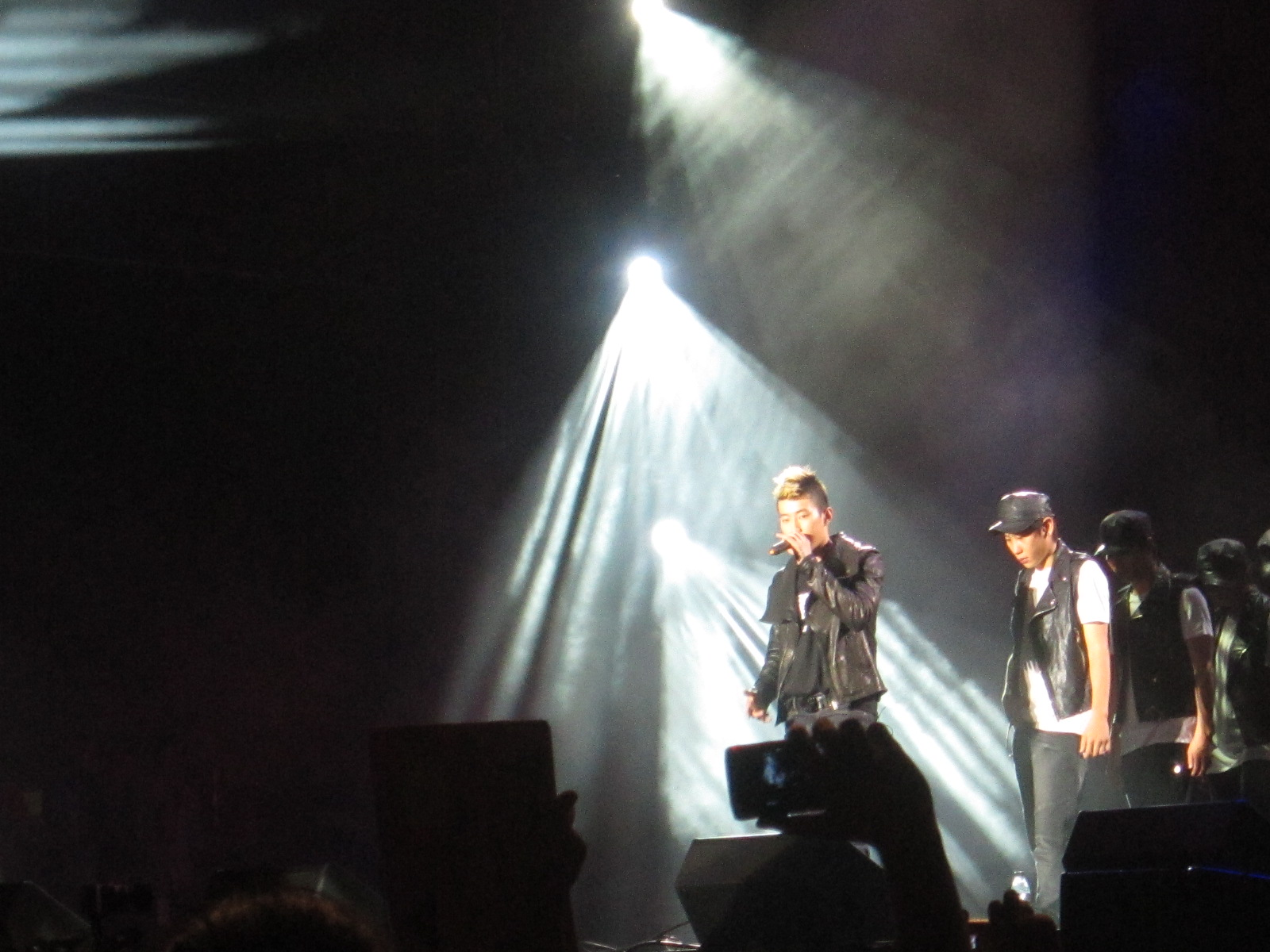
Jay Park performing in front of over 25,000 fans at the concert grounds on October 29, 2011.

Entertainment events at the Mall of Asia concert grounds
Date(s)	Headline entertainer(s)	Event
2009
March 7	Eraserheads	Eraserheads Live! The Final Set
March 14	Journey	Live in Manila
May 16	David Cook; David Archuleta	David Cook & David Archuleta: Live In Manila
June 12	The Pussycat Dolls	Doll Domination Tour
November 14	Katy Perry	Hello Katy Tour
2010
January 9	Ne-Yo	Ne-Yo Live in Manila
March 9	Paramore	Brand New Eyes World Tour
March 27	Timbaland; Justin Timberlake; JoJo	Changing Lives benefit concert (Shock Value II Tour)
July 9	Usher	OMG Tour
September 11	Rain; U-KISS	Intensity Live in Manila
October 1	John Mayer	John Mayer Live in Manila
October 10	Adam Lambert	Glam Nation Tour
2011
January 8	Charice Pempengco; Gary Valenciano	1@11
May 10	Justin Bieber	My World Tour
June 17	Miley Cyrus	Gypsy Heart Tour
October 25	The Black Eyed Peas	The Beginning Massive Stadium Tour
October 29	Jay Park; Evaline; Parokya ni Edgar; Pupil; Ebe Dancel; The Itchyworms	MTV EXIT Live in Manila
2012
January 22	Katy Perry	California Dreams Tour
2013
January 19	Exo; Girls' Generation; Infinite; Tahiti; Tasty; U-KISS	Dream KPOP Fantasy Concert
April 27	Afrojack; Alex Gaudino; Apster; Cedric Gervais; Cobra Starship; Dev; Jump Smokers; Sandwich; Spongecola; Urbandub	Close-Up Summer Solstice: Summer Music Festival
2014
June 11	Apl.de.ap; Funk Avy; Hard Rock Sofa; Infected Mushroom; Laidback Luke; Mars Miranda; Motherbasss	#OneVibePH: One Nation, One Pride Concert
2015
March 21–22	One Direction	On the Road Again Tour
May 16	Martin Garrix with Eva Shaw; Angus & Julia Stone; Autotelic; BP Valenzuela; Motherbasss; Nix Damn P Sinyma	Close-Up Forever Summer 2015
September 26	A-Trak; Fedde le Grand; Mija; Skrillex; W&W; Vicetone; Zeds Dead	Road to Ultra: Philippines
December 13	Axwell and Ingrosso; Dvbbs; Nervo; Oliver Heldens	Sonic Carnival 2015
2016
May 21	Dimitri Vegas & Like Mike; Goldfish & Blink; Julian Jordan; Mattn	Close-Up Forever Summer 2016
June 24	Apink; Bebe Rexha; Far East Movement; Gab Valenciano; Gary Valenciano; James Reid; Nadine Lustre; OneRepublic	MTV Music Evolution Manila
November 12	Borgeous; Mars Miranda; Martin Pulgar; Jessica Milner; Kat DJ; Katsy Lee; Marc Marasigan; Travis Monsod; Carlo Atendido; Aaron Atayde; Ron Thug; Roda King	Unleashed 7
2017
January 14	Various	Rakrakan: OPM Against Drugs Festival
January 27	6cyclemind Aegis; Andrew E. Autotelic; Bamboo Mañalac; Callalily; Gabby Alipe; Gloc-9; Gracenote; James Reid; Lyca Gairanod; Kyle Echarri; Nadine Lustre; The Ransom Collective; Raymond Lauchengco; Regine Velasquez; Sarah Geronimo; Yassi Pressman; Yeng Constantino; Zendee Rose Tenerefe	Fusion 2017: The Philippine Music Festival Year 3
February 17	Journey	Eclipse Tour
April 4	Coldplay	A Head Full of Dreams Tour
December 9	Gab and John of Urbandub; The Ransom Collective; Noel Cabangon; Curtismith; Gracenote; Abra; Ebe Dancel; Autotelic; Moonstar88; Franco; Reese Lansangan; Sandwich; BP Valenzuela	Coke Studio Live: Bringing Music Back to Marawi
2018
April 8	Ed Sheeran	÷ Tour

== SMX Convention Center Manila ==
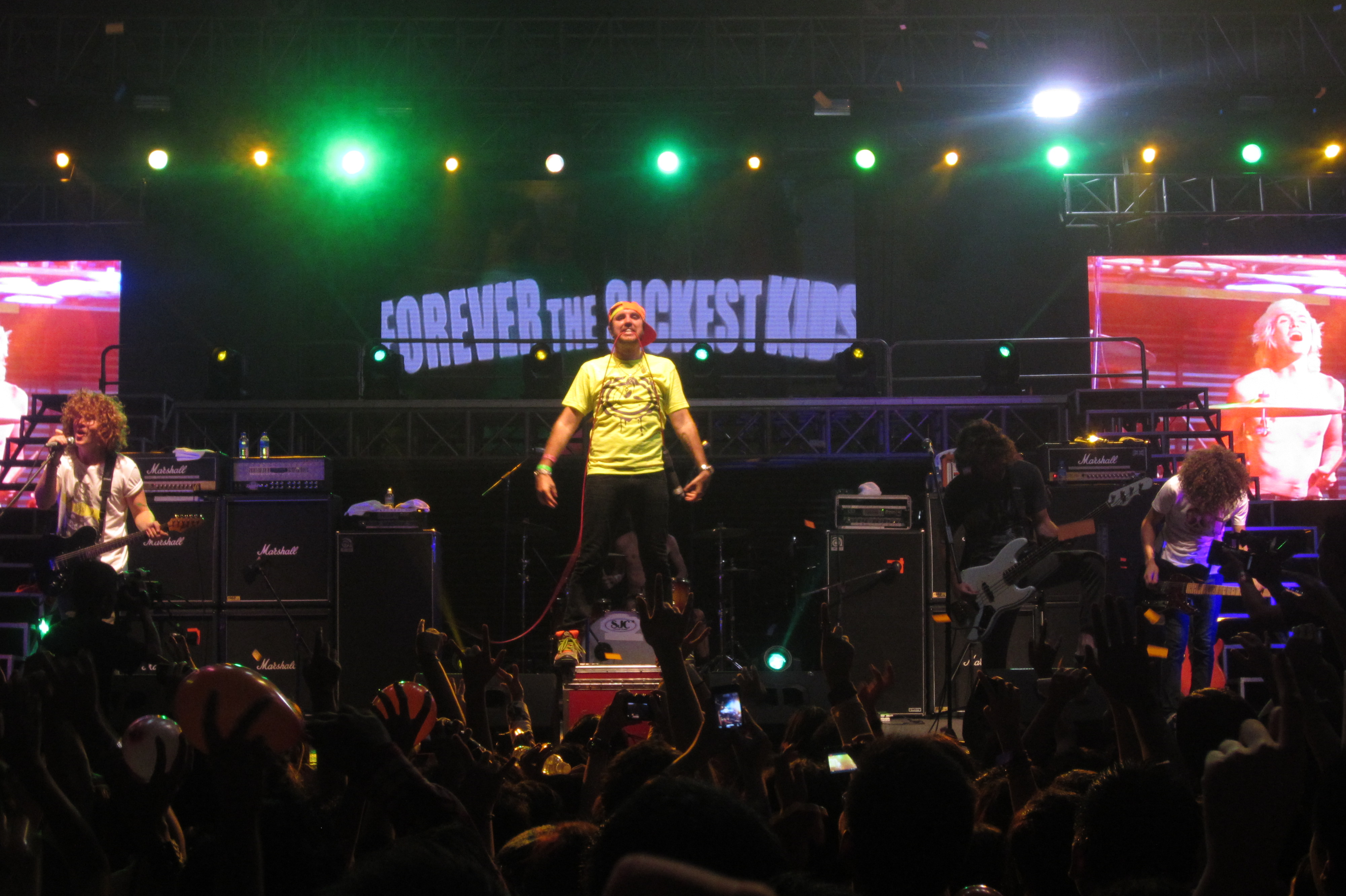
Forever the Sickest Kids performing at the SMX Convention Center on September 30, 2012

Entertainment events at the SMX Convention Center Manila
Date(s)	Headline entertainer(s)	Event
2008
August 5	Alicia Keys	As I Am Tour
2009
June 27	Charice Pempengco, Regine Velasquez	Charice: The Journey Begins
2011
January 8	Bone Thugs-n-Harmony	The Crossroads Asia Tour
May 23	Maroon 5	Maroon 5 Live in Manila 2011
July 4	Bobby Kimball	Greatest Hits Tour
December 2	Coolio	Coolio Live in Manila
2012
September 30	The Pretty Reckless; Mayday Parade; Marianas Trench; A Skylit Drive; Forever the Sickest Kids; The Maine; The Wonder Years; Avastera; Salamin; Robin Nievera; Penguin	Bazooka Rocks Festival
November 17	Village People	Village People Live in Manila
2013
February 14	Angeline Quinto	Angeline Quinto In Love
August 25	A Rocket to the Moon; All Time Low; The Red Jumpsuit Apparatus; Anberlin; We Came as Romans; RadioDriveBy; Tonight Alive; UchuSentai:Noiz; Save Me Hollywood; Faintlight; Mad Hatter Day; Penguin	Bazooka Rocks II Festival
December 12	Zedd	Moment of Clarity World Tour
December 28	Boyfriend; Lunafly; LC9; A.cian	5th Annual Philippine Kpop Convention
2014
June 25–26	Sam Tsui, Kurt Hugo Schneider	Sam Tsui and Kurt Schneider Live in Manila
August 2	Dantz; Ayumi; Tsubee; Dajiro; Ace Ramos; Deuce Manila; Curse and Bless	Tokyo EDM Invasion 2014
August 30	The Used; Taking Back Sunday; Saves the Day; Senses Fail; Brickcity; Ria Bautista; Tiger Pussy; Runway Crimes	Bazooka Rocks III Festival
August 31	You Me at Six; We Are the In Crowd; The Summer Set; Echosmith; Coldrain; Chicosci; Gracenote; December Avenue; Nyctinasty; Paranoid City	Bazooka Rocks III Festival
2015
April 24	Bamboo Mañalac	Bamboo Gig for Giving Benefit Concert
2016
August 26–28	Various	Asia Pop Comic Convention Manila 2016
2024
March 1	Yoona	Yoona Fan Meeting Tour: Yoonite

== See also ==
- List of events held at the Philippine Arena
