= Nothing's About to Happen to Me Live 2026 =

2026 concert tour by Mitski

- Tour by Mitski
- Location: North America; Europe; Australia; Asia
- Associated album: Nothing's About to Happen to Me
- Start date: March 2, 2026
- End date: September 25, 2026
- No. of shows: 36
- Supporting acts: Sex Week; Gustaf; La Zorra Zapata; Haley Heynderickx; Canozan; Maria Somerville; Tarta Relena; Gwenifer Raymond; Folk Bitch Trio

Mitski concert chronology
- The Land is Inhospitable And so Are We Tour (2024); Nothing's About to Happen to Me Live 2026 (2026)

Nothing's About to Happen to Me Live 2026 (also known as Nothing's About to Happen to Me Tour) was a concert tour by American singer-songwriter Mitski, in support of her eighth studio album Nothing's About to Happen to Me (2026). The tour began on March 2, 2026, in New York City, New York and concluded on September 25, 2026, in Columbia, Maryland.

== Background ==
On February 3, 2026, Mitski announced a single from her upcoming album titled "I'll Change for You". On the same day she also announced her upcoming tour, featuring supporting acts Sex Week, Gustaf, La Zorra Zapata, Haley Heynderickx, Canozan, Maria Somerville, Tarta Relena, Gwenifer Raymond and Folk Bitch Trio.

The tour features residency dates in New York City, Los Angeles, and Sydney, as well as other headline shows and festival appearances.

== The Tansy House ==
Prior to the opening residency shows at The Shed, Mitski also had an exhibit at the same venue titled "The Tansy House". Inspired by Grey Gardens and the writer Shirley Jackson, it was meant to be the "spiritual home" of the album. The exhibit features several book and vinyl collections, as well as a space where fans can fill out Post-It notes and take pictures, among other activities.

The exhibit was accessible for ticket holders before the start of each residency show. And prior to the residency, it was accessible for the general public between February 27 and March 1.

== Set list ==
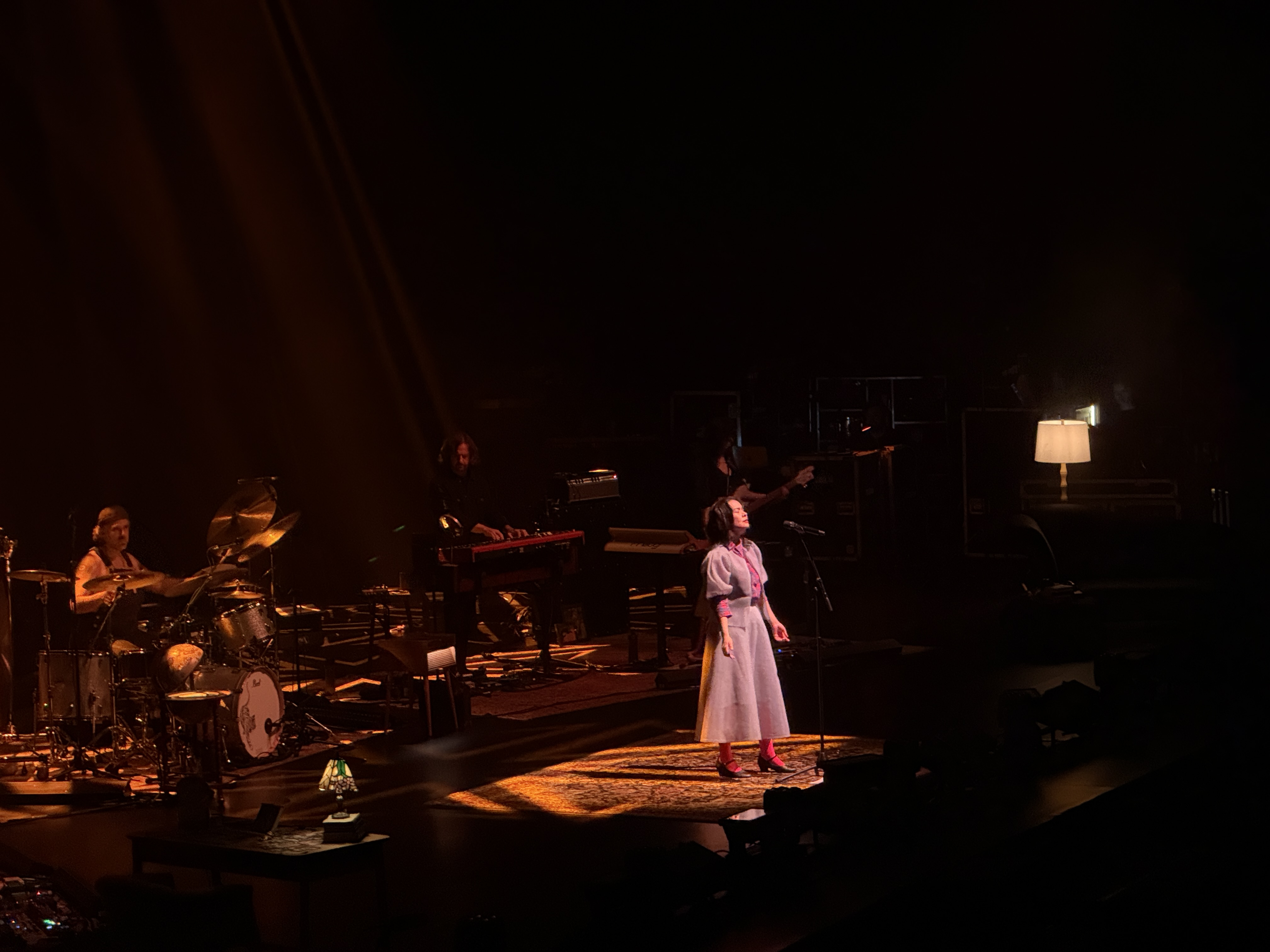
Mitski performing "Working for the Knife" in Pasay, July 2026

This set list is representative of the show on March 3 in New York City. It is not representative of all concerts for the duration of the tour.

1. "In a Lake"
2. "Cats"
3. "Working for the Knife"
4. "Buffalo Replaced"
5. "Dead Women"
6. "I Bet on Losing Dogs"
7. "Where's My Phone?"
8. "Heaven"
9. "I'll Change for You"
10. "When Memories Snow"
11. "Instead of Here"
12. "Circle"
13. "Washing Machine Heart"
14. "Dan the Dancer"
15. "I Want You"
16. "Francis Forever"
17. "If I Leave"
18. "Stay Soft"
19. "A Horse Named Cold Air"
20. "Two Slow Dancers"
21. "Lightning"
22. "My Love Mine All Mine"
23. "That White Cat"

Encore

24. "Pearl Diver"

== Tour dates ==
List of shows, showing date, city, country, venue and supporting acts
| Date | City | Country | Venue | Supporting act(s) |
|---|---|---|---|---|
| March 2 | New York City | United States | The Shed | Sex Week |
| March 3 | New York City | United States | The Shed | Sex Week |
| March 4 | New York City | United States | The Shed | Sex Week |
| March 6 | New York City | United States | The Shed | Gustaf |
| March 7 | New York City | United States | The Shed | Gustaf |
| March 8 | New York City | United States | The Shed | Gustaf |
| March 23 | Mexico City | Mexico | Auditorio Nacional | La Zorra Zapata |
| March 30 | Los Angeles | United States | Hollywood High School | Haley Heynderickx |
| March 31 | Los Angeles | United States | Hollywood High School | Haley Heynderickx |
| April 2 | Los Angeles | United States | Hollywood High School | Haley Heynderickx |
| April 3 | Los Angeles | United States | Hollywood High School | Haley Heynderickx |
| April 4 | Los Angeles | United States | Hollywood High School | Haley Heynderickx |
| May 2 | Istanbul | Turkey | KüçükÇiftlik Park | Canozan |
| May 5 | Paris | France | Zénith Paris | Maria Somerville |
| May 6 | Amsterdam | Netherlands | AFAS Live | Tarta Relena |
| May 7 | Amsterdam | Netherlands | AFAS Live | Tarta Relena |
| May 9 | Brussels | Belgium | Forest National | Gwenifer Raymond |
| May 11 | Glasgow | Scotland | Barrowland Ballroom | —N/a |
| May 13 | Birmingham | England | Birmingham Town Hall | —N/a |
| May 14 | Leeds | England | Project House | —N/a |
| May 15 | Manchester | England | Project Century | —N/a |
| May 17 | Bristol | England | Electric Bristol | —N/a |
| May 18 | Kingston upon Thames | England | Circuit | —N/a |
| May 21 | London | England | Royal Albert Hall | —N/a |
| May 23 (Note: The concert in Sunderland on May 23 is part of BBC Radio 1's Big Weekend.) | Sunderland | England | Herrington Country Park | —N/a |
| May 29 | Sydney | Australia | Sydney Opera House | Folk Bitch Trio |
| May 30 | Sydney | Australia | Sydney Opera House | Folk Bitch Trio |
| May 31 | Sydney | Australia | Sydney Opera House | Folk Bitch Trio |
| June 1 | Sydney | Australia | Sydney Opera House | Folk Bitch Trio |
| July 14 | Pasay (Note: Billed as Manila in promotional materials) | Philippines | SM Mall of Asia Arena | —N/a |
| July 16 | Bangkok | Thailand | UOB Live | —N/a |
| July 18 (Note: The concert in Jakarta on July 18 is part of We The Fest Selects.) | Jakarta | Indonesia | Tennis Indoor Senayan | —N/a |
| July 20 | Kuala Lumpur | Malaysia | Zepp KL | —N/a |
| July 21 | Singapore | | The Star Theatre | —N/a |
| July 26 (Note: The concert in Yuzawa on July 26 is part of Fuji Rock Festival.) | Yuzawa | Japan | Naeba Ski Resort | —N/a |
| September 25 (Note: The concert in Columbia on September 25 is part of All Things Go Festival.) | Columbia | United States | Merriweather Post Pavillion | —N/a |
