= Save Me Hollywood =

Filipino pop punk band

- Origin: Quezon City, Philippines
- Genres: Pop punk; alternative rock
- Years active: 2010–2018
- Labels: 12 Stone; Universal
- Members: Juliann Savard; Calde Calderon; Kenneth Aranza; Aaron Corvera; JR Jabla
- Past members: Francis Tuazon; Ariel Lumanlan; Melvin Macatiag

Save Me Hollywood was a Filipino pop punk band formed in 2010. The band consisted of Myx video jockey Julz Savard, Aaron Isaac Corvera and Kenneth Wayne Aranza of April Morning Skies, Carlos Calderon of Chicosci, and JR Jabla. Melvin Macatiag of Typecast was one of their founding members.

== History ==
The idea of forming a female-fronted band started from Carlos Calderon, the bassist of Chicosci and a marketing person for Myx, sharing it with Typecast drummer Melvin Macatiag. Calderon then met Juliann "Julz" Savard, who also worked for Myx as a video jockey, during a taping session. The plan came into fruition from there with Calderon recruiting guitarists Keneth Aranza and Aaron Corvera from the band April Morning Skies to fill out the band.

In June of 2013, the band released their first album Your Story to Tell. From that album came the singles "High", "Changes", and "Happier This Way". They gained popularity as radio stations started playing their songs and they performed at notable rock music festivals such as the Bazooka Rocks Festival. They also became brand ambassadors for Dr. Martens.

In 2014, the band opened for The Red Jumpsuit Apparatus and MAGIC!. They also went on tour to promote their debut album. In 2015, they released their EP Headlights, with "Everybody Wants You" as its lead single. They also opened for Cody Simpson that year. In 2017, the band performed at the Rakrakan Festival.

Eventually, Savard decided to go solo, first as an indie artist then as a contemporary worship singer. In 2018, Corvera and Calderon formed a new band, bird., and Save Me Hollywood disbanded.

== Discography ==
=== Studio albums ===
- Your Story to Tell (12 Stone/Universal, 2014)

=== Extended plays ===
- Headlights (12 Stone/Universal, 2015)

== Awards and nominations ==
Year	Award giving body	Category	Nominated work	Results	Ref.
2014	Awit Awards	Best Rock/Alternative Recording	"High"	Nominated	
2015	Myx Music Awards	Favorite Rock Video	"Happier This Way"	Nominated	
