= Son of Spergy Tour =

2026 concert tour by Daniel Caesar

- Tour by Daniel Caesar
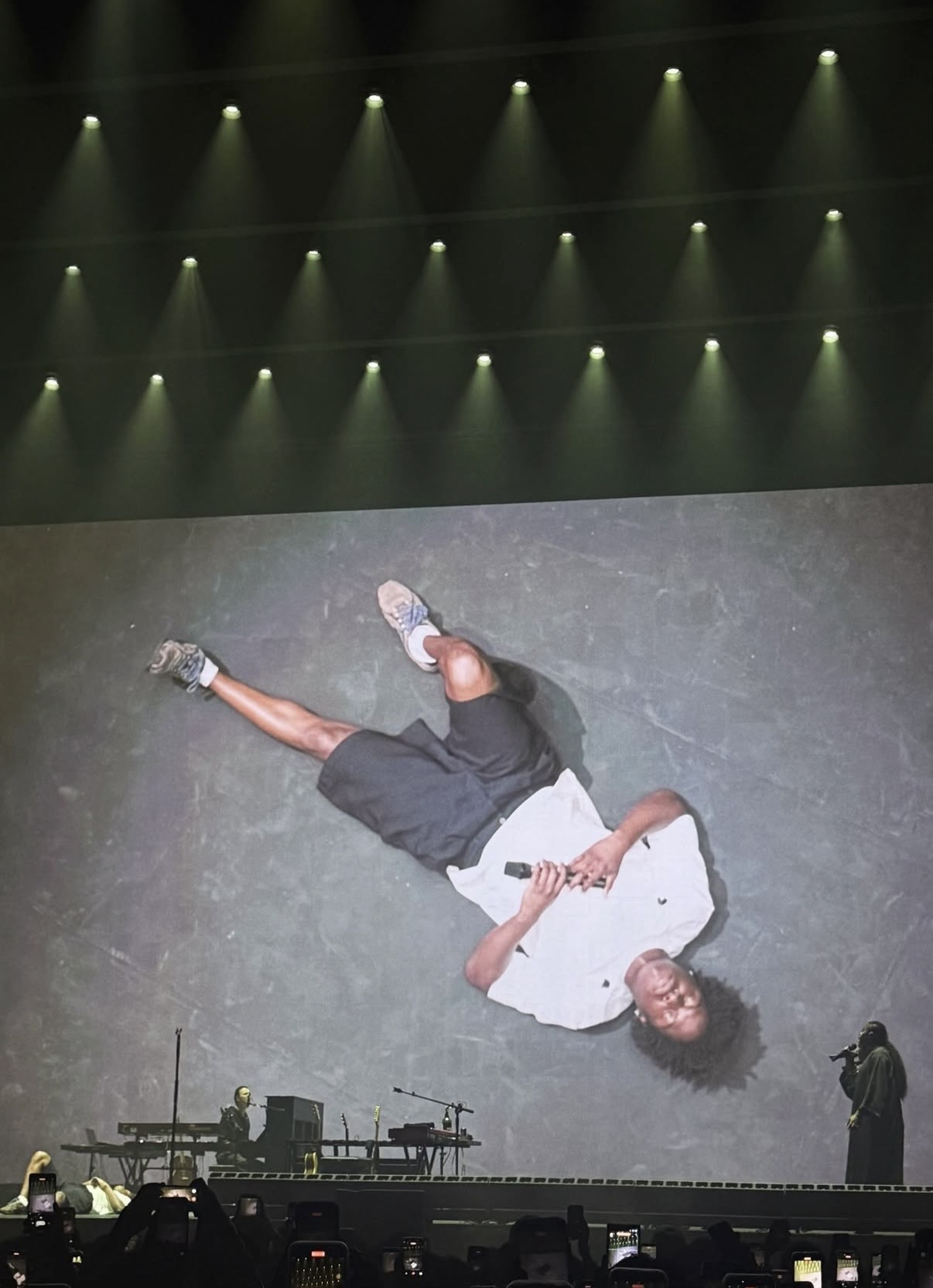
- Caesar performing in the Philippines in May 2026
- Associated album: Son of Spergy
- Start date: May 16, 2026
- End date: November 22, 2026
- No. of shows: 14 in Asia; 28 in North America; 7 in Europe; 49 in total

Daniel Caesar concert chronology
- Superpowers World Tour (2023); Son of Spergy Tour (2026)

The Son of Spergy Tour is the fourth headlining concert tour by Canadian recording artist Daniel Caesar. The tour is in support of his album, Son of Spergy (2025). The tour is the first arena tour Caesar has headlined. Faye Webster and 070 Shake are joining him as opening acts for select North American dates. The tour spans Asia, North America, and Europe.

== Opening acts ==
- Faye Webster (North America, select dates)
- 070 Shake (North America, select dates)

== Tour dates ==
Date	City	Country	Venue
Asia
May 16, 2026	Singapore		Singapore Indoor Stadium
May 17, 2026	Singapore		Singapore Indoor Stadium
May 19, 2026	Pasay (Note: Labelled as Manila in promotional material.)	Philippines	SM Mall of Asia Arena
May 20, 2026	Pasay	Philippines	SM Mall of Asia Arena
May 21, 2026	Pasay	Philippines	SM Mall of Asia Arena
May 24, 2026	Petaling Jaya (Note: Labelled as Kuala Lumpur in promotional material.)	Malaysia	Idea Live Arena
May 25, 2026	Petaling Jaya	Malaysia	Idea Live Arena
May 26, 2026	Petaling Jaya	Malaysia	Idea Live Arena
May 29, 2026	Goyang (Note: Labelled as Seoul in promotional material.)	South Korea	Korea International Exhibition Center
May 31, 2026^{[A]}	Tangerang Regency (Note: Labelled as Jakarta in promotional material.)	Indonesia	Nusantara International Convention Exhibition
June 2, 2026	Hong Kong		AsiaWorld–Expo
June 4, 2026	Tokyo	Japan	Tokyo International Forum
June 6, 2026	Taoyuan (Note: Labelled as Taipei in promotional material.)	Taiwan	Messe Taoyuan
June 9, 2026	Pak Kret (Note: Labelled as Bangkok in promotional material.)	Thailand	Impact Arena
North America
July 14, 2026	Denver	United States	Ball Arena
July 16, 2026	Phoenix	United States	Mortgage Matchup Center
July 19, 2026	Austin	United States	Moody Center
July 20, 2026	Dallas	United States	American Airlines Center
July 23, 2026	Tampa	United States	Benchmark International Arena
July 24, 2026	Atlanta	United States	State Farm Arena
July 25, 2026 (Note: The date is part of the Eaux Claires Festival.)	Eau Claire	United States	Carson Park
July 26, 2026	Chicago	United States	United Center
July 28, 2026	Baltimore	United States	CFG Bank Arena
July 30, 2026	Brooklyn	United States	Barclays Center
July 31, 2026	Boston	United States	TD Garden
August 2, 2026	Toronto	Canada	Scotiabank Arena
August 3, 2026	Toronto	Canada	Scotiabank Arena
August 5, 2026	Ottawa	Canada	Canadian Tire Centre
August 6, 2026	Montreal	Canada	Bell Centre
August 10, 2026	Winnipeg	Canada	Canada Life Centre
August 13, 2026	Edmonton	Canada	Rogers Place
August 14, 2026	Calgary	Canada	Scotiabank Saddledome
August 16, 2026	Vancouver	Canada	Rogers Arena
August 17, 2026	Vancouver	Canada	Rogers Arena
August 18, 2026	Portland	United States	Moda Center
August 20, 2026	San Francisco	United States	Chase Center
August 21, 2026	San Francisco	United States	Chase Center
August 23, 2026	Anaheim	United States	Honda Center
August 24, 2026	Anaheim	United States	Honda Center
Europe
August 29, 2026	London	United Kingdom	Victoria Park
September 2, 2026	London	United Kingdom	The O2 Arena
September 4, 2026	Manchester	United Kingdom	Co-op Live
September 6, 2026	Amsterdam	Netherlands	Ziggo Dome
September 8, 2026	Brussels	Belgium	Forest National
September 9, 2026	Paris	France	Adidas Arena
September 11, 2026	Cologne	Germany	Lanxess Arena
Oceania
November 5, 2026	Sydney	Australia	Afterpay Arena
November 8, 2026	Melbourne	Australia	Rod Laver Arena
November 12, 2026	Brisbane	Australia	Brisbane Entertainment Centre
Latin America
November 20, 2026	Mexico City	Mexico	Autódromo Hermanos Rodríguez
November 29, 2026	Bogotá	Colombia	Vive Claro
December 2, 2026	São Paulo	Brazil	Suhai Music Hall
December 5, 2026	Buenos Aires	Argentina	Estadio Obras Sanitarias
December 8, 2026	Lima	Peru	Costa 21
December 10, 2026	Santiago	Chile	Movistar Arena

Festivals and other miscellaneous performances
^{A} This concert is a part of "Java Jazz Festival"

== Notes ==
Cities
