= Gustaf (band) =

American art punk band

- Origin: Brooklyn, New York, U.S.
- Genre: Art rock, indie rock, post-punk revival
- Years active: 2014–present
- Label: Royal Mountain Records
- Members: Lydia Gammill; Tine Hill; Vram Kherlopian; Tarra Thiessen
- Past members: Melissa Lucciola
- Website: gustaftheband.com

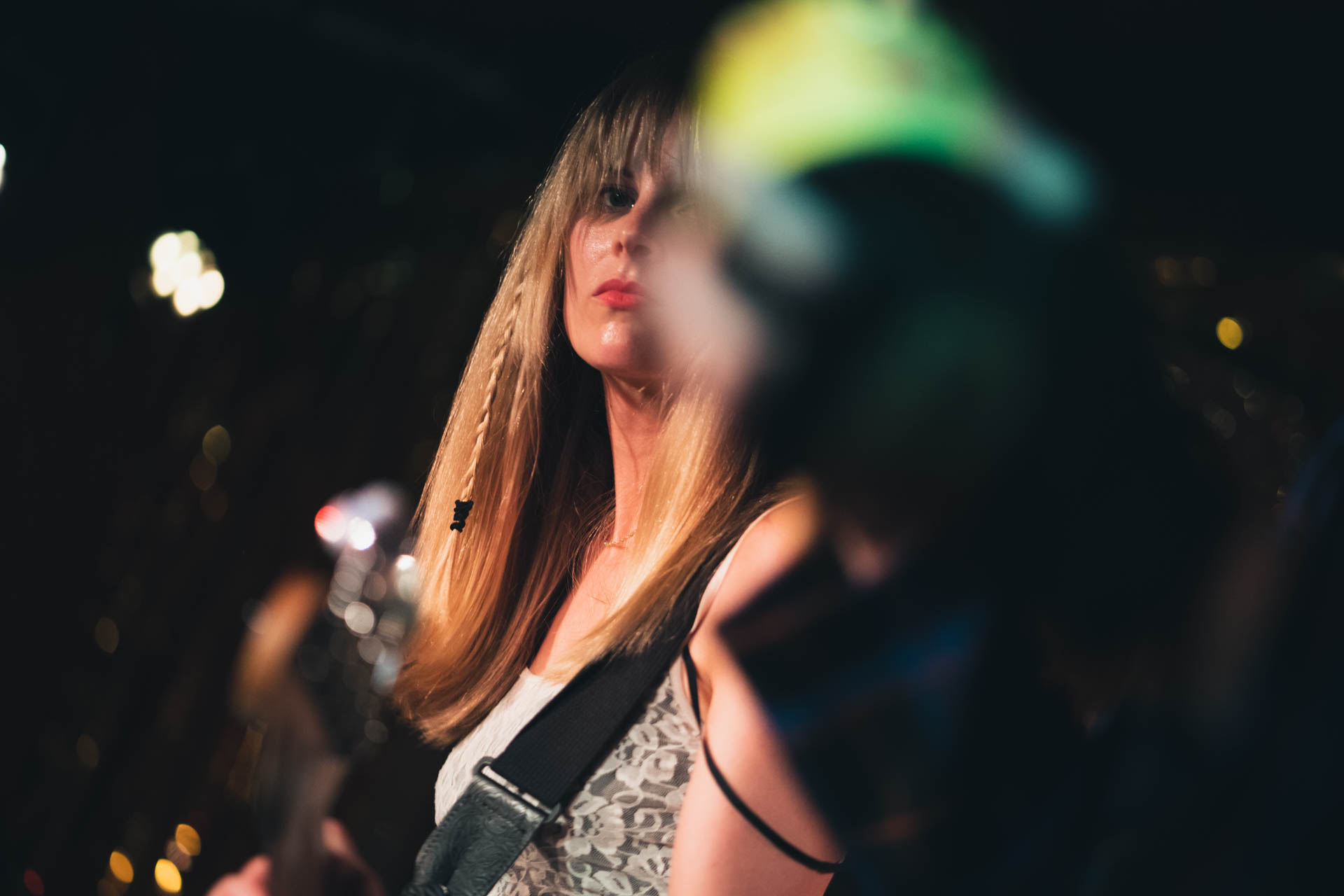
The NYC band Gustaf at the Moth Club - Memorable Order Of Tin Hats.

Gustaf is an American art punk band from Brooklyn, New York.

== History ==
The group formed in 2018. In 2020, the band released two songs, "Mine" and "Design". In 2021, the band released their debut album, Audio Drag for Ego Slobs, through Royal Mountain Records. On January 10, Gustaf announced details of their sophomore album "Package Pt. 2" out on April 5, 2024, alongside a new tour.

The group released a cover of "I Trusted You" by 1970s performance artist Andy Kauffman, a four minute song repeating those same three words. The song was featured in an advertisement for the iPhone.

Lydia Gammill got “Gustaf” from a random poster her dad gave her. When she moved into her first apartment in NYC, her dad gave her this old poster from a 1972 exhibit on King Gustaf III. She liked how the word looked and sounded, so when they suddenly needed a band name (after they’d already booked gigs and taken photos), she grabbed “Gustaf” off the poster.

In August 2026 the band announced via their Instagram page that drummer Melissa Lucciola would be leaving the band to pursue other projects. In the same post they confirmed work on a third studio album and live shows planned for fall 2026.

== Discography ==
Studio albums

- Audio Drag for Ego Slobs (2021)
- Package Pt 2 (2024)
