= Songs for Heroes =

Benefit concert series

Songs For Heroes
- Location: Philippines
- Start date: 19 March 2015
- End date: 31 October 2017
- Legs: 3
- No. of shows: 3 total

concert chronology
- Songs For Heroes 3 (2017–10); Songs For Heroes (2015–03); Songs For Heroes 4 (still unofficial)

The Songs for Heroes is a benefit concert dedicated for the immediate families of soldiers and policemen in the Philippines. It is initiated by the television channel, UNTV, and the Members Church of God International with its leaders Bro. Eli Soriano, Bro. Daniel Razon with special participation of Philippine National Police, Tagaligtas and Armed Forces of the Philippines. It is directed by Floy Quintos with Mon del Rosario as its musical director and Alex Cortez serve as creative director.

== Songs For Heroes 1 ==
It is the first benefit concert dedicated to the families of SAF 44 who were casualties at the Mamasapano clash held at the SM Mall of Asia Arena, Pasay on 19 March 2015. The March concert raised six million pesos.

=== Participants ===
- Noel Cabangon
- Jonalyn Viray
- Gerald Santos
- Faith Cuneta
- Bo Cerrudo
- Neocolours
- Jay Durias
- Mcoy Fundales
- Miro Valera
- Jason Fernandez
- Jek Manuel
- Beverly Caimen
- Shanne Velasco
- The Voysing
- Bueno Sisters
- Bembe and Triposa Erese
- Arnee Hidalgo

=== Other performances ===
- AFP and PNP Talents
- AFP Combo
- PNP Chorale
- Ang Dating Daan Choir

== Songs For Heroes 2 ==
With its theme: Ang Mamatay Nang Dahil Sa Iyo (To Die For You), Songs For Heroes 2 was held on 30 June 2015 also at the SM Mall of Asia Arena. Ticket proceeds of the said concert were given to the AFP and PNP for the fallen and wounded soldiers in line for duty. Several government officials including DOJ Sec. Leila de Lima, Court Administrator Midas Marquez, AFP Chief of Staff Pio Catapang and PNP Chief of Staff Leonardo Espina went there in the concert. PBC President Atom Henares and PBC Chairman Emeritus Larry Henares personally joined the crowd.

=== Participants ===
- Gerphil Flores
- Gwyneth Dorado
- Jed Madela
- Jenine Desiderio
- Sam Shoaf
- Kuh Ledesma
- Wency Cornejo
- Jeffrey Hidalgo

=== Other performances ===
- The 5th Gen
- PNP and AFP Chorale

== Songs For Heroes 3 ==
Recognizing the sacrifices of soldiers and police personnel in Marawi City and to give charity benefits of their immediate families, UNTV hosted Songs For Heroes 3, with the theme Bayani ng Marawi (Heroes of Marawi). A benefit concert aimed to support families of those killed in action (KIA) during the 154-day siege. The concert was held at SM Mall of Asia Area on 31 October 2017. The concert gave financial assistance of 6 million pesos to the Armed Forces of the Philippines (AFP) and two million pesos to the Philippine National Police (PNP).

=== Participants ===
- Kris Lawrence
- Darren Espanto
- Jason Dy
- Richard Reynoso
- Jamie Rivera
- Jett Pangan
- Chacha Cañete
- Bo Cerrudo
- Aia De Leon
- Ney Dimaculagan
- Leah Patricio
- Plethora
- Mela

=== Other performances ===
- The KNC Kids
- Wish 107.5's Wishcovery's Wishful 20
- PNP and AFP Chorale
