= 2017 in Philippine music =

The following is a list of notable events that are related to Philippine music in 2017.

== Events ==
=== January ===
- After 13 years, Up Dharma Down officially renamed themselves as UDD.

=== March ===
- March 11 – Noven Belleza, a farmer from Visayas, was crowned as champion in Tawag ng Tanghalan.

=== April ===
- April 9 – Awra Briguela was declared the first winner of Your Face Sounds Familiar Kids.

=== June ===
- June 10 – Jhon Clyd Talili emerged as the grand champion of Tawag ng Tanghalan Kids that spanned for three months.
- June 12 – Billboard Philippines started compiling three official music charts: Philippine Hot 100, Philippine Top 20 and Catalog Chart.
- June 30 – Magic 89.9, 99.5 Play FM, Wave 89.1, 103.5 K-Lite and Jam 88.3 joined forces for a unified OPM concert series entitled One Sound, with its first event were held at the Eastwood Central Plaza.

=== July ===
- July 30 – Jona Soquite of Davao City won as the first The Voice Teens grand champion.

=== August ===
- August 1 – MTVph was launched on all cable/satellite providers in the Philippines. It is co-owned by Viacom International Media Networks Asia and Solar Entertainment Corporation.

=== September ===
- Coke Studio Philippines announced its lineup of contemporary and indie Filipino acts for its inaugural season, namely: Gab and John of Urbandub, The Ransom Collective, Ebe Dancel, Autotelic, Noel Cabangon, Curtismith, Gracenote, Abra, Moonstar88, Jensen and The Flips (later removed), Franco, Reese Lansangan, Sandwich, and BP Valenzuela.

=== October ===
- October 15 – ASAP launched an acoustic singing group named ASAP Jambayan, composed of Iñigo Pascual, Zia Quizon, Moira Dela Torre, Migz Haleco, Kaye Cal and Isabela Vinzon.

== Debuts ==
=== Soloist ===
- Zsaris
- Kio Priest
- Claudia Baretto
- Volts Vallejo
- Curtismith
- Leila Alcasid
- Donny Pangilinan
- Noel Comia
- Janina Vela
- Gabbi Garcia
- Aia De Leon

=== Duos/bands/groups ===
- BoybandPH
- Hey Joe Show
- Carousel Casualties
- Agsunta
- BennyBunnyBand
- IV of Spades
- Conscious and the Goodness

== Reunions/comebacks ==
- Somedaydream
- Pedicab
- Taken by Cars
- Orange and Lemons
- Kamikazee

== Albums released ==
The following albums are released in 2017 locally. Note: All soundtracks are not included in this list.

Date released	Title	Artist(s)	Label(s)	Source
January 6	D5 Studio Live Originals	Somedaydream and Nicole Asensio	MCA Music	
January 7	High Hello	Wonggoys	22 Tango Records	
January 25	Kian Dionisio	Kian Dionisio	GMA Records	
January 27	JKL	Juan Karlos Labajo	MCA Music	
January 28	Reality & Dreams	Loop	Bomba Press, Yellow Room Music Philippines	
January 28	BoybandPH	BoybandPH	Star Music	
January 29	@LoveAngelineQuinto	Angeline Quinto	Star Music	
January 30	Just Wright	James Wright	GMA Records	
February 10	Nagma(ma)hal, BennyBunnyBand	BennyBunnyBand	Ivory Music and Video	
February 10	Worth	TheSunManager	Bright Rocket Records	
February 13	Soully Yours	Curtismith	Independent	
February 14	May Forever Pa More	Natalia Moon	GMA Records	
February 25	Remuda Triangle	Pedicab	Soupstar Music	
February 27	Jona	Jona	Star Music	
March 3	The Roach Motel	Flying Ipis	Locked Down Entertainment	
March 3	Plagues	Taken by Cars	Party Bear Records, Warner Music Philippines	
March 4	Super Shadow Moses Turbo	Shadow Moses	Futurestudio	
March 10	Mahabang Pila	Toney Chrome	Warner Music Philippines	
March 20	Kaye Cal	Kaye Cal	Star Music	
March 24	Joshua Oliveros	Joshua Oliveros	MCA Music	
March 25	Favorite	Ang Bandang Shirley	Wide Eyed Records Manila	
March 25	Everything and Anything	Persephone	GMA Records	
March 28	Pangako ng Kailanman	Maricris Garcia	GMA Records	
April 7	Hanggang Wakas (Deluxe Edition)	Mitoy Yonting	MCA Music	
April 8	Blackbird	Luke Mejares	Homeworkz Music	
April 14	The Great Moombahton	Moombahton Players	Fastplay Records	
April 28	Edray	Edray Teodoro	MCA Music	
April 28	Metropolitan	Paranoid City	Independent	
April 28	Happier Pretending	Absolute Play	Star Music	
April 29	Sophomore	Gimme 5	Star Music	
April 30	Of Sound Mind and Memory	Reese Lansangan	Independent	
May 4	Sassy Sassa	Sassa Dagdag	PolyEast Records	
May 5	Be with Me (Deluxe Edition)	Darren Espanto	MCA Music	
May 8	SAM: 12	Sam Milby	Star Music	
May 10	LA Santos	LA Santos	Star Music	
May 19	Madison	Carousel Casualties	Independent	
May 20	Traces	The Ransom Collective	Independent	
May 23	Soul Supremacy	KZ Tandingan	Star Music	
May 26	Holographic: Green Year	Somedaydream	MCA Music	
May 27	Nostalgia 2	The Company	Universal Records	
May 31	Magandang Simulain	Glaiza de Castro	PolyEast Records	
June 14	Volts Vallejo	Volts Vallejo	Star Music	
June 16	Unstoppable	Upgrade	Ivory Music and Video	
June 16	Kahit Kunwari	TJ Monterde	PolyEast Records	
June 21	Maymay	Maymay Entrata	Star Music	
June 29	I Belong to the Zoo	I Belong to the Zoo	Independent	
June 30	I Love Acoustic 10.1	Sabrina	MCA Music	
June 30	[escape]	Keiko Necesario	Independent	
July 7	Inner Play (Deluxe Edition)	Apartel	Offshore Music	
July 8	Palm Dreams	James Reid	Viva Records	
July 15	Beaudacious	Gio Levy	Independent	
July 28	Klarisse	Klarisse de Guzman	Star Music	
August 4	Biyaheng Langit	Davey Langit	Star Music	
August 4	Janelle Jamer	Janelle Jamer	Viva Records	
August 11	Byahe Pa Rin	Noel Cabangon	Universal Records	
August 11	Key of X EP	Xian Lim	Star Music	
August 25	The Singles	Curse One	Warner Music Philippines	
August 25	RAP Heartist	Abaddon	Warner Music Philippines	
September 5	AboutRadio	AboutRadio	Warner Music Philippines	
September 15	Sa Kabila ng Lahat	Rivermaya	Star Music	
September 17	Whatever That Was	She's Only Sixteen	Party Bear Records	
September 28	Touch of Your Love	Kim Chiu	Star Music	
September 29	Kapit	Christian Bautista	Universal Records	
October 3	BTTR	Jensen and The Flips	Yellow Room Music Philippines	
October 9	Rotonda	Gloc-9	Universal Records	
October 13	Songs I Grew Up With	RJ Jacinto	RJ Productions	
October 21	Mundane	Lions and Acrobats	Independent	
November 11	Soberhaul	MilesExperience	MCA Music	
December 8	Before the Babies	Cheats	Independent	
December 8	Materyal	Shanti Dope	Universal Records	

== Concerts and music festivals ==
Concert date(s)	Artist(s)	Venue	City	Event / Tour	Ref(s)
January 5	David Guetta	Smart Araneta Coliseum	Quezon City	Unity Tour	
January 13 – 14	Planetshakers	Smart Araneta Coliseum	Quezon City	Planetshakers Live in Manila/Quezon City	
January 14	Various^{Note 1}	Mall of Asia Concert Grounds	Pasay	Rakrakan: OPM Against Drugs Festival	
January 14 – 15	Various (incl. Steve Aoki)	Cebu Business Park	Cebu City	Plus63 Music Festival	
January 18	Bryan Adams	Smart Araneta Coliseum	Quezon City	Get Up Tour	
January 27	Various	Mall of Asia Concert Grounds	Pasay	Fusion: The Philippine Music Festival Year 3	
January 30	Nicky Romero, Bassjackers	Okada Manila, Aseana Business Park	Parañaque	The 65th Miss Universe After-Party	
February 4	Patti Austin	Kia Theatre	Quezon City	Patti Austin Live in Manila	
February 10	Yellowcard	SM City North EDSA – Skydome	Quezon City	The Final World Tour	
February 11	Goo Goo Dolls	Smart Araneta Coliseum	Quezon City	Goo Goo Dolls Live in Manila	
February 14	Vice Ganda	Smart Araneta Coliseum	Quezon City	Pusuan Mo Si Vice Ganda sa Araneta: Nagmahal, Nasaktan, Nag-Concert	
February 14	Ai-Ai Delas Alas, Erik Santos, Ogie Alcasid	Kia Theatre	Quezon City	Hugot Playlist	
February 14–15	Gary Valenciano	Grand Ballroom, Shangri-La at the Fort	Taguig	Gary V. Love in Motion	
February 15	Jon Santos, Kakai Bautista, Rex Navarrete	Resorts World Manila	Pasay	Extra Judicial Kidding	
February 17	Journey	Mall of Asia Concert Grounds	Pasay	Journey Live in Manila	
February 17	Aia de Leon, Barbie Almalbis & Kitchie Nadal	Music Museum	San Juan, Metro Manila	Secrets: The Repeat Concert	
February 18	The Moffatts	Smart Araneta Coliseum	Quezon City	The Farewell Tour	
February 24	Before You Exit	Kia Theatre	Quezon City	Asia Tour 2017	
February 25 – 26	Exo	Smart Araneta Coliseum	Quezon City	Exo Planet 3 – The Exo'rdium	
March 2	PSY, SHINee, CNBLUE, B1A4, BAP, BtoB, and AOA	Mall of Asia Arena	Pasay	Global Peace Concert One K	
March 3	Kiiara	The Palace Pool Club, Uptown Bonifacio	Taguig	/ESCAPE's First Anniversary	
March 4	Various (The Temper Trap, The Ting Tings, Explosions in the Sky, Yuna, Purity Ring, UDD, Honne, LANY, Woodlock, Gab and John of Urbandub, Tom's Story, Fools and Foes, Reese Lansangan, Lola Amour, Banna Harbera, Mickey Sulit)	Filinvest City Event Grounds	Muntinlupa	Wanderland Music and Arts Festival 2017	
March 10–13	Various	Malasimbo Amphitheater	Puerto Galera	Malasimbo Music & Arts Festival 2017	
March 18	Shawn Mendes	Mall of Asia Arena	Pasay	Shawn Mendes World Tour	
March 18	Bethel Music	Smart Araneta Coliseum	Quezon City	Bethel Music Worship Night – Live in Manila	
March 22	Various (Christian Bautista, KC Concepcion, Sam Concepcion, Morissette Amon, Lea Salonga, Aicelle Santos, Erik Santos, Tippy Dos Santos, Julie Anne San Jose, Janina Vela)	Mall of Asia Arena	Pasay	Disney Princess: I Dare to Dream Concert	
March 27	Al McKay	Newport Performing Arts Theater, Resorts World Manila	Pasay	Al McKay's Earth, Wind & Fire Experience	
March 31	Morissette, Jona, Klarisse de Guzman and Angeline Quinto	Mall of Asia Arena	Pasay	ASAP Birit Queens Live at the MOA Arena	
March 31	The Tide	Glorietta	Makati	The Tide: Live @ Ayala Malls	
March 31	The Tide	TriNoma	Quezon City	The Tide: Live @ Ayala Malls	
April 1	The Tide	Market! Market!	Taguig	The Tide: Live @ Ayala Malls	
April 1	The Tide	Alabang Town Center	Muntinlupa	The Tide: Live @ Ayala Malls	
April 1	Iggy Azalea	The Palace Pool Club, Uptown Bonifacio	Taguig	Iggy Azalea: Live in Manila	
April 4	Coldplay	Mall of Asia Concert Grounds	Pasay	A Head Full of Dreams Tour	
April 5	Fifth Harmony	Mall of Asia Arena	Pasay	The 7/27 Tour	
April 8	Various (Jonas Blue, Dyro, Headhunterz, Rave Radio, Onder Koffer, Tony Romera, Zoo Theory, Tom Taus, Callum David, The Zombettes, Cathy Frey, Sai Dy, MC Boo, and Victor Pring)	Globe Circuit Event Grounds	Makati	Chroma Music Festival 2.0	
April 22	Various	B-Side, The Collective	Makati	Red Ninja Year 8 Fest	
April 29	Various (Megadeth, DragonForce, Whitechapel, The Devil Wears Prada, Crossfaith, Gods of Eden, Slapshock, Greyhoundz, WilaBaliW, Razorback, Kjwan)	Amoranto Sports Complex	Quezon City	Pulp Summer Slam XVII Redemption	
May 6–7	BTS	Mall of Asia Arena	Pasay	2017 BTS Live Trilogy Episode III: The Wings Tour	
May 6	Ogie Alcasid, Morissette and Tanya Manalang	Newport Performing Arts Theater, Resorts World Manila	Pasay	Platinum: World's Favorite Hit Songs... Live!	
May 14	Village People, Björn Again	Kia Theatre	Quezon City	Village People: 40th Anniversary Tour	
May 20	Various (including An Honest Mistake)	Mall of Asia Arena	Pasay	Get Music Indie-Go	
May 27	Alden Richards	Kia Theatre	Quezon City	Upsurge	
May 27	Various (William Singe, Bamboo, KZ Tandingan, Kiana Valenciano, Curtismith, Sam Concepcion, Franco, Jess Connelly, Saydie, The Juans, Tukar Sinati, A Team, Ron Poe, Patty Tiu, Carlo Atendido, Tom Taus)	Globe Circuit Event Grounds	Makati	Manila X 2017	
June 11	Various	Globe Circuit Event Grounds	Makati	Neverland Manila: Young Gunz	
June 15	Britney Spears	Mall of Asia Arena	Pasay	Britney: Live in Concert	
June 24	The Maine	SM North EDSA – Skydome	Quezon City	Bazooka Rocks V: A Pop Punk Weekend	
June 25	State Champs, With Confidence, Cambridge	SM North EDSA – Skydome	Quezon City	Bazooka Rocks V: A Pop Punk Weekend	
July 7	Various (Pentagon, B1A4, BAP, BtoB, VIXX, BIG, Kriesha Chu)	Mall of Asia Arena	Pasay	Super Pop Con 2017	
July 7	China Crisis, Peter Coyle	Kia Theatre	Quezon City	China Crisis and Peter Coyle Live in Manila	
July 15	Xian Lim	Solaire Resort & Casino	Parañaque	Song in the Key of X	
July 21	Oh Wonder	SM Aura Premier – Samsung Hall	Taguig	Ultralife World Tour	
July 28	Park Shin-hye	Smart Araneta Coliseum	Quezon City	Flower of Angel: Park Shin Hye Live in Manila	
August 4	LANY	Glorietta	Makati	LANY: Live @ Ayala Malls	
August 5	LANY	Greenbelt	Makati	LANY: Live @ Ayala Malls	
August 5	LANY	Alabang Town Center	Muntinlupa	LANY: Live @ Ayala Malls	
August 6	LANY	Market! Market!	Taguig	LANY: Live @ Ayala Malls	
August 6	LANY	Trinoma	Quezon City	LANY: Live @ Ayala Malls	
August 14	Liam Gallagher	Mall of Asia Arena	Pasay	Liam Gallagher Live in Manila	
August 15	Phoenix	Kia Theatre	Quezon City	Phoenix Live in Manila	
August 17	Various (5 Seconds of Summer, Zara Larsson, Daya, Two Door Cinema Club, DNCE, Dua Lipa)	Mall of Asia Arena	Pasay	In the Mix 2017	
August 18	G-Eazy	The Palace Pool Club, Uptown Bonifacio	Taguig	G-Eazy: Live at The Palace Pool Club	
August 21	Ariana Grande	Mall of Asia Arena	Pasay	Dangerous Woman Tour	
August 22	All Time Low	Mall of Asia Arena	Pasay	The Young Renegades Tour	
August 25	Ogie Alcasid	Kia Theatre	Quezon City	Nakakalokal	
August 31	Michael Learns to Rock	Kia Theatre	Quezon City	Eternal Asia Tour	
September 1	G-Dragon	Smart Araneta Coliseum	Quezon City	Act III, M.O.T.T.E World Tour	
September 8	Jamie Rivera	Music Museum	San Juan City	Hey It's Me, Jamie	
September 13	The Chainsmokers	Mall of Asia Arena	Pasay	Memories Do Not Open Tour	
September 15	Various (Zedd, Hardwell, Getter, REZZ, and Sam Feldt)	Mall of Asia Arena	Pasay	Road to Ultra: Philippines 2017	
September 16	Lucy Rose	19 East Bar	Muntinlupa	Worldwide Cinema Tour 2017	
September 16	Joey Ayala, Various	Music Museum	San Juan City	Mandiriwa: Joey Ayala at ang Bagong Lumad	
September 23	Matisyahu	SM North Skydome	Quezon City	Matisyahu Live in Manila	
September 25	Dream Theater	Kia Theatre	Quezon City	Images, Words & Beyond Tour	
September 30	Against the Current	U.P. Town Center	Quezon City	In Our Bones World Tour II	
October 1	Against the Current	Ayala Malls Solenad	Santa Rosa	In Our Bones World Tour II	
October 6	SEVENTEEN	Mall of Asia Arena	Pasay	2017 SEVENTEEN 1st World Tour: Diamond Edge	
October 6	Jake Zyrus	Music Museum	San Juan	I Am Jake Zyrus	
October 6	The Vamps	Vertis North	Quezon City	Middle of the Night Tour	
October 7	Mayday Parade	Kia Theatre	Quezon City	A Lesson in Romantics 10th Anniversary Tour	
October 11	Slayer	Kia Theatre	Quezon City	Slayer in Manila	
October 12	Mr. Big	Kia Theatre	Quezon City	Defying Gravity World Tour	
October 14	Erykah Badu	Sofitel Philippine Plaza Manila	Pasay	Badu vs. Everything World Tour	
October 20	David Archuleta	Kia Theatre	Quezon City	David Archuleta Live in Manila	
October 21–22	Regine Velasquez	Mall of Asia Arena	Pasay	R3.0	
November 6	Lauv	Alabang Town Center	Muntinlupa	Lauv: Live at the Ayala Malls	
November 7	Lauv	U.P. Town Center	Quezon City	Lauv: Live at the Ayala Malls	
November 15	Kid Ink	House Manila, Resorts World Manila	Pasay	Kid Link: Live in Manila	
November 18	RJ Jacinto	Insular Life Theater	Muntinlupa	Rock 'n Roll Classics	
November 18	Jona Viray	The Theatre at Solaire Resort & Casino	Parañaque	Prima Jona	
November 25	Various (Ely Buendia, Rivermaya, Ebe Dancel, Itchyworms, Barbie Almalbis)	Smart Araneta Coliseum	Quezon City	GetMusic NURock Years	
November 25	Various^{Note 2}	Century City Mall	Makati	The Rest is Noise Year-End 2017	
November 28	Engelbert Humperdinck	Smart Araneta Coliseum	Quezon City	50th Anniversary Tour	
November 30	Ogie Alcasid	Newport Performing Arts Theater, Resorts World Manila	Pasay	The Soundtrack of My Life	
December 2	Various	B-Side, The Collective	Makati	Red Ninja Year-Ender Fest	
December 4	Brian McFadden, Keith Duffy	Kia Theatre	Quezon City	Boyzlife Live in Manila	
December 8	Jessa Zaragoza and Dingdong Avanzado	Newport Performing Arts Theater, Resorts World Manila	Pasay	20/30	
December 9	Flume	The Palace Pool Club, Uptown Bonifacio	Taguig	Flume: Live at The Palace Pool Club	
December 9	CNBLUE	Smart Araneta Coliseum	Quezon City	[BETWEEN US] Tour	
December 13	Rich Chigga, Joji, Higher Brothers	House Manila, Resorts World Manila	Pasay	88rising Asia Tour	
December 16	Anggun	Uptown Mall	Taguig	Anggun Live!	
December 17	Anggun	Eastwood Mall Open Park	Quezon City	Anggun Live!	

Note 1. KZ Tandingan, Taken by Cars, Techy Romantics, Cheats, Bullet Dumas and BP Valenzuela were originally part of the lineup but cancelled their performance due to uncertain reasons.

Note 2. Jensen and The Flips and Poor Taste were originally part of the lineup but dropped by organizers amid sexual harassment allegations.

=== Cancelled/postponed ===
Concert date(s)	Artist(s)	Venue	City	Event / Tour	Reason cited	Ref(s)
February 5	Juan Karlos Labajo	Kia Theatre	Quezon City	JKL Live	Unforeseen circumstances (rescheduled for a later date)	
February 25	James Taylor	Mall of Asia Arena	Pasay	James Taylor with His All-Star Band live in Manila	To protest the extrajudicial killings related to the Philippine drug war.	
March 24	Charice	Kia Theatre	Quezon City	Charice X: End of a Chapter Rock Concert	Personal reasons	
April 21	China Crisis, Peter Coyle	Kia Theatre	Quezon City	China Crisis and Peter Coyle Live in Manila	Unknown reasons (rescheduled for July 7)	
September 30	Justin Bieber	Philippine Arena	Bocaue	Purpose World Tour	Unforeseen circumstances	
November 3	Rain	Smart Araneta Coliseum	Quezon City	Rise 2 Shine: A Benefit Concert	Mismanangement issues (rescheduled for a later date)	
November 7	Ed Sheeran	Mall of Asia Concert Grounds	Pasay	÷ Tour	Injury (rescheduled for April 8, 2018)	
November 14	Various	Ayala Triangle Gardens	Makati	ASEAN Music Festival	Safety concerns due to overcrowding. Some reports claimed that concert-goers fainted.	
November 11	Jona Viray	The Theatre at Solaire Resort & Casino,	Parañaque	Prima Jona	Roadblocking due to the ASEAN summit (rescheduled for November 18)	

== Awarding ceremonies ==
- January 16 – 2nd Wish 107.5 Music Awards, organized by Wish 1075
- March 16 – Myx Music Awards 2017, organized by myx
- August 5 – MOR Pinoy Music Awards 2017, organized by MOR 101.9
- November 26 – 30th Awit Awards, organized by the Philippine Association of the Record Industry
