= 2016 in Philippine music =

The following is a list of notable events that are related to Philippine music in 2016.

== Events ==
=== January ===
- January 1 – Myx introduces the four new VJs of the channel, Sharlene San Pedro, Jairus Aquino, Sarah Carlos and Alex Diaz.
- January 9 – Members from the classic line-up of Rivermaya consisting of Perf de Castro, Nathan Azarcon, Mark Escueta and Rico Blanco reunite at 19 East, Taguig City after an invitation from de Castro following his gig. The gig, which they dubbed as a "secret semi-reunion", was composed of Blanco on keyboards, de Castro on guitars, Azarcon on bass guitar and Escueta on drums. Blanco and de Castro simultaneously switch over lead vocals all throughout the performance while Azarcon and Escueta provided backing vocals. Bamboo Mañalac was invited as well, however it was reported that he was out of the country on that date.
- January 24 – During an episode of Sunday PinaSaya on GMA Network, Julie Anne San Jose receives her triple platinum award for her 2nd album, Deeper.
- January 26 – Darren Espanto takes 7 awards including the Young Artist of the Year award in the 1st Wish Music Awards at the Smart Araneta Coliseum, organized by FM radio station Wish 1075.
- January 31 – Alden Richards, the other half of the phenomenal loveteam Aldub, receives his triple platinum award for his best-selling album, Wish I May, during an episode of Sunday Pinasaya, also on GMA.
- January 31 – After 10 years, rapper Gloc-9 signed a record deal with Star Music the music arm of ABS-CBN Corporation and the record label who introduced Gloc-9 to mainstream listeners. Two of the most successful albums of Gloc-9, G9 and Ako Si... were released under Star Records back in 2003 and 2005 respectively. These albums brought Gloc-9's biggest smash hits with songs like Simpleng Tao and Hinahanap Ng Puso (feat. Hannah Romawac of Session Road).
- January 31 – Ebe Dancel, formerly the vocalist of Sugarfree launched his album "Bawat Daan" at Eastwood Central Plaza. The album art, which features Ebe on a stroll through UP Los Baños' Freedom Park, conjures up a picture of nostalgia, and yet, it is also a movement towards a new chapter for his artistry. Coincidentally, the musician tells the crowd that this album launch is somewhat a send-off party for him, as he moves back to his hometown of Los Baños, Laguna. The song from which the album gets its name, Bawat Daan, is an ode to a lover, the only constant in a world of doubts. It was originally composed for the stage musical Sa Wakas, which featured the music of Sugarfree. He officially launched it in Entablado Cafe in Los Baños on March 10.

=== February ===
- February 20 – The song AlDub You, MaAlden Kita, composed by Ritchi Ramos and Richie Austria crowns as the winner of the AlDub Songwriting Contest organized by Eat Bulaga!
- February 29 – Ma. Jinky Banzon of Barangay 360, Santa Cruz, Manila crowns as the grand champion of the Tinig ng Maynila held at the San Andres Sports Complex. The competition was a project between the Manila government and Viva Live.

=== March ===
- March 15 – Nadine Lustre has 5 wins (Favorite Song, Favorite Collaboration with James Reid, Favorite Music Video, Favorite Artist and Favorite Female Artist). While Abra won the first Best Music Video. And, Ogie Alcasid was the MYX Magna Awardee.
- March 30 – The music of late rapper Francis Magalona is used for the musical Three Stars and a Sun, as the closing presentation of the Philippine Educational Theater Association's 47th theater season.

=== April ===
- April 23 – Yohan Hwang, a Korean tourist based in Manila, bags the first Grand Touristar title of the reality competition show I Love OPM at the Newport Performing Arts Theater of Resorts World Manila in Pasay.

=== May ===
- May 15 – ASAP launched two singing groups, the ASAP Birit Queens, composed of Jona, Morissette, Klarisse de Guzman and Angeline Quinto and the ASAP Soul Sessions, composed of Jason Dy, Daryl Ong, Jay R, KZ Tandingan and Kyla.

=== July ===
- July 17 – The all-male group Tres Kantos, of Bugoy Drilon, Jovit Baldivino, and former Tawag ng Tanghalan contestant Dominador Aviola, also known as Daddy D, mentored by Erik Santos was named the first winner of the celebrity competition We Love OPM during the show's live finale at Resorts World Manila.
- July 23 – Di Na Muli, interpreted by Itchyworms, wins this year's Philippine Popular Music Festival held at the KIA Theater.

=== August ===
- August 1 – Myx introduced two new other VJs, Sunny Kim and Donny Pangilinan.
- August 27 – Joshua Oliveros, coached by Lea Salonga won the third season of The Voice Kids held at the Newport Performing Arts Theater, Resorts World Manila.

=== September ===
- September 15 – Billboard Philippines was officially launched.

=== November ===
- November 11 - Female singing champions Kyla, Angeline Quinto, KZ Tandingan and Yeng Constantino, collectively known as DIVAS staged their first concert at the Smart Araneta Coliseum called DIVAS Live in Manila.

=== December ===
- December 11 – Niel Murillo, Russell Reyes, Ford Valencia, Tristan Ramirez and Joao Constancia were named as the winners of the Pinoy Boyband Superstar and they will officially be called BoybandPH.

== Debuts ==
=== Soloist ===
- Bailey May
- Darlene Vibares
- Derrick Monasterio
- Gabby Alipe
- JC de Vera
- Kenneth Rey Parsad (psalmist during the Pope Francis' mass in the Manila Cathedral in 2015)
- Liza Soberano
- Ylona Garcia
- Zeus Collins

=== Bands/groups ===
- Moombahton Players
- Ex Battalion
- CH4RMD
- Top One Project (T.O.P.)
- Sugar 'N Spice
- #Hashtags
- Migz and Maya
- BoybandPH
- Apartel
- Leanne and Naara
- Banna Harbera

== Reunion/comebacks ==
- Donna Cruz

== Albums released ==
The following albums are released in 2016 locally. Note: All soundtracks are not included in this list.

Date released	Title	Artist(s)	Label(s)	Source
January 3	Swinging the Kundiman	Ramon Jacinto	RJ Productions	
January 11	Sa 'Yo Lamang: Papuri at Inspirasyon	Noel Cabangon	Universal Records, Jesuit Communications	
January 22	Darlene Vibares	Darlene Vibares	MCA Music	
January 27	Liwanag	Aicelle Santos	HomeWorkz Music	
January 28	Tom's Story	Tom's Story	Independent	
January 29	Miro Valera	Miro Valera	Warner Music Philippines	
January 29	Skin	Sud	Warner Music Philippines	
January 31	How I Love	CRWN and Jess Connelly	Independent	
February 12	December Avenue	December Avenue	Tower of Doom	
February 15	Stellar	JC de Vera	Ivory Music and Video	
February 21	Now and Forever	Donna Cruz	Star Music	
February 26	Light of Day	Yolanda Moon	Terno Recordings	
February 29	Transparent	Gracenote	Warner Music Philippines, Soupstar Entertainment	
March 4	Forever Young	Anne Curtis	Viva Records	
March 4	Bago	Sam Concepcion	Universal Records	
March 18	Still	Kenneth Rey Parsad	Universal Records	
April 1	For The Rest of My Life	Mayonnaise	Warner Music Philippines, Yellow Room Music Philippines	
April 5	Derrick Monasterio	Derrick Monasterio	GMA Records	
April 8	Ikaw Ang Buhay Ko	Ogie Alcasid	Universal Records	
April 15	Logiclub X1	Various Artists	Futurestudio, MCA Music	
May 6	Dekada	Bassilyo	MCA Music	
May 6	Medyo Serious	Banda ni Kleggy	Warner Music Philippines	
May 13	#Hashtags	#Hashtags	Star Music	
May 16	Top One Project (T.O.P.)	Top One Project (T.O.P.)	GMA Records	
May 19	TJ Monterde	TJ Monterde	PolyEast Records	
May 20	EDM (Enchong Dee Moves)	Enchong Dee	Star Music	
May 20	Be With Me	Darren Espanto	MCA Music	
May 20	Life of a Champion	Quest	Warner Music Philippines	
May 28	10 Pieces	Jim Paredes	Independent	
May 30	Kahapon... Ngayon	Martin Nievera	PolyEast Records	
June 2	Of the Bed	Moonwlk	Independent	
June 3	Persistence EP	Banna Harbera	Independent	
June 3	Tim Pavino	Tim Pavino	Star Music	
June 5	Sukli	Gloc-9	Star Music	
June 10	What You Want	Rayver Cruz	Star Music	
June 10	Cheats	Cheats	Independent	
June 17	Sab	Sabrina	MCA Music	
June 20	Now Playing: Myrtle	Myrtle Sarrosa	Ivory Music and Video	
June 24	Chapter 8	Eurika	Aika Records, Warner Music Philippines	
June 24	Limerence	Brisom	Warner Music Philippines	
June 26	@Primetime	Gary Valenciano	Star Music	
July 16	A La Hoy!	Giniling Festival	Terno Recordings	
July 17	Chasing the Light	Julie Anne San Jose	GMA Records	
July 17	Hiling	Mark Carpio	Warner Music Philippines	
July 27	Life Songs: MMK 25 Commemorative Album	Various Artists	Star Music	
August 5	My Name Is Ylona Garcia	Ylona Garcia	Star Music	
August 19	Michael	Michael Pangilinan	Star Music	
August 19	Sinag Tala	Sponge Cola	Universal Records	
September 2	Solenn	Solenn Heussaff	Universal Records	
September 2	Sings Your Favorite Love Songs	Richard Poon	Universal Records	
September 2	Sanguine	Run Dorothy	Independent	
September 9	Sa Panaginip Lang	The Ryan Cayabyab Singers	Curve Entertainment	
September 9	Third Culture Kid	NINNO	Futurestudio, MCA Music	
September 12	Ultimate	Jennylyn Mercado	Ivory Music and Video	
September 15	Migz & Maya	Migz & Maya	Star Music	
September 23	It's Me, Kyle	Kyle Echarri	MCA Music	
September 23	Salubungan	Johnoy Danao	Universal Records	
September 26	Richard x Richard: The Chinito Crooners	Richard Poon and Richard Yap	Star Music	
September 29	Inner Play	Apartel	Offshore Music	
September 30	Papunta Pabalik	Autotelic	MCA Music	
September 30	Elmo	Elmo Magalona	Universal Records	
October 7	Elha	Elha Nympha	MCA Music	
October 7	A New Strain	Gabby Alipe	MCA Music	
October 7	Catharsis	Charice	Star Music	
October 10	Say It Again	Alden Richards	GMA Records	
October 14	Vina Morales (30th Anniversary Album)	Vina Morales	Star Music	
October 17	Pogi Years Old	Parokya ni Edgar	Universal Records	
October 21	Inigo Pascual	Inigo Pascual	Star Music	
October 21	To The Moon & Back	Alexa Ilacad	Star Music	
October 22	Romancing RJ	Ramon Jacinto	RJ Productions	
December 9	Taurus	Pino G	PolyEast Records	
December 16	Again & Against	MilesExperience	MCA Music	
December 17	Ben&Ben	Ben&Ben	Warner Music Philippines	
December 19	Karla Estrada	Karla Estrada	Star Music	

== Concerts and music festivals ==
=== January–March ===
Concert date(s)	Artist(s)	Venue(s)	Concert title/tour	Ref(s)
January 15	The Red Jumpsuit Apparatus	SM City North EDSA – Skydome, Quezon City	Don't You Fake It 10th Anniversary World Tour	
January 15	Jessa Zaragosa	Music Museum, San Juan	I Am Me	
January 16	Edgar Allan Guzman	Music Museum, San Juan	#AlwaysEA	
January 16	Jose Manalo, Wally Bayola	SM Mall of Asia Arena, Pasay	Sa Totoong Buhay Naman	
January 16	Karla Estrada, Melai Cantiveros, Jolina Magdangal, Nyoy Volante, Maxene Magalona, Eric Nicolas	Pacific Ballroom, Waterfront Hotel and Casino, Cebu City	Kamukha, Kachika, Kapamilya	
January 19	Nate Ruess	Kia Theatre, Quezon City	Nate Ruess Live in Manila 2016	
January 19	One Ok Rock	SM Mall of Asia Arena, Pasay	2016 35xxxv Asia Tour	
January 20	Chicago	Smart Araneta Coliseum, Quezon City	Chicago Live in Manila	
January 22	The Company	Music Museum, San Juan	Nostalgia	
January 23–24	EXO	SM Mall of Asia Arena, Pasay	Exo Planet #2 - The Exo'luxion	
January 28	Neck Deep	SM City North EDSA – Skydome, Quezon City	Neck Deep 2016 World Tour: South East Asia	
January 28	Cecile Licad	CCP Main Theater, Pasay	Cecile Licad: Encore!	
January 29	Retrospect	Music Museum, San Juan	Retrospect Reunion Concert Tour 2016	
January 29	Jose Mari Chan, Richard Poon (with Francis Kong)	Fairmont Hotel Ballroom, Makati	My FUN+ny Valentine Dinner Concert	
January 29	Various	SM Mall of Asia Concert Grounds, Pasay	Fusion Music Festival	
January 30	The Vamps with Before You Exit and The Tide	SM Mall of Asia Arena, Pasay	The Vamps with Before You Exit and Special Guest The Tide Live in Manila	
February 6	Solenn Heussaff, Lovi Poe	Music Museum, San Juan	Fantaisie	
February 6	Various (incl. Mayonnaise, Silent Sanctuary, Join the Club)	Imus Sports Complex, Imus, Cavite	Pebrerocks	
February 10	Dan Hill	Newport Performing Arts Theater, Resorts World Manila, Pasay	Dan Hill: The King of Romance	
February 11–12	Gerphil Flores	The Theatre, Solaire Resort & Casino, Parañaque	Tales of Love	
February 12	South Border (feat. Top Suzara and Kyla)	Kia Theatre, Quezon City	A Valentine's Concert	
February 13–14	Gladys Guevarra, Boobsie, Ate Gay, Papa Jack	Smart Araneta Coliseum, Quezon City	Panahon Ng May Tama #Comic-Kilig	
February 13	Rico Blanco	Music Museum, San Juan	Your Alternative Valentine	
February 13	Martin Nievera, Regine Velasquez, Erik Santos and Angeline Quinto	SM Mall of Asia Arena, Pasay	Royals	
February 13	Dan Hill	Midas Hotel and Casino Tent, Pasay	Dan Hill: The King of Romance	
February 13	Daryl Ong	Teatrino Prominade, San Juan	Intimate	
February 13	Various (incl. Rico J. Puno, Marco Sison, Raymond Lauchengco, Gino Padilla, Wency Cornejo, Chad Borja, Niña, and Roselle Nava)	PICC Plenary Hall, Pasay	#LoveThrowback	
February 13	Sungha Jung	Newport Performing Arts Theater, Resorts World Manila, Pasay	Sungha Jung Live in Manila	
February 13	The Circus Band and New Minstrels	Kia Theater, Quezon City	The Greatest Hits Reunion Concert: The Best of our Love	
February 13	The Platters (feat. Johnny Thompson, Elvis Presley impersonator)	The Theatre, Solaire Resort & Casino, Parañaque	The World-famous Platters Live in Manila	
February 14	The Platters (feat. Johnny Thompson, Elvis Presley impersonator)	Edsa Shangri-La, Manila Ballroom, Mandaluyong	The World-famous Platters Live in Manila	
February 14	Dennis Lambert, Joey Albert	The Theatre, Solaire Resort & Casino, Parañaque	Celebrate Love	
February 14–15	Lani Misalucha (feat. Philippine Madrigal Singers)	Edsa Shangri-La, Manila Ballroom, Mandaluyong	Love Catcher	
February 16	Libera	PICC Plenary Hall, Pasay	Angels Sing: Libera Valentine's Concert	
February 16	Boyce Avenue	Smart Araneta Coliseum, Quezon City	Boyce Avenue Philippine Tour 2016	
February 18	Boyce Avenue	Waterfront Cebu City Hotel & Casino	Boyce Avenue Philippine Tour 2016	
February 19	Boyce Avenue	Limketkai Mall, Cagayan de Oro	Boyce Avenue Philippine Tour 2016	
February 20	Boyce Avenue	La Salle Coliseum, Bacolod	Boyce Avenue Philippine Tour 2016	
February 19	Johnoy Danao, Ebe Dancel, and Bullet Dumas	Music Museum, San Juan	3D: 1st Anniversary Concert	
February 20	James Reid and Nadine Lustre	Smart Araneta Coliseum, Quezon City	JaDine Love: One Hot Concert	
February 20	Various (incl. Darius Campbell, Chvrches, Myd, Oh Wonder, Passion Pit, and Pedro Winter)	Aseana City Open Grounds, Parañaque	GoodVybes Festival	
February 22	Boyce Avenue	University of Baguio	Boyce Avenue Philippine Tour 2016	
February 24–25	Madonna	SM Mall of Asia Arena, Pasay	Rebel Heart Tour	
February 27	Arnel Pineda	Music Museum, San Juan	Arnel Pineda: Love and Rock N' Roll	
February 27	Daniel Padilla	Ynares Center, Antipolo	Daniel Padilla Live!	
March 3	Chris Botti ft. Sting	Resorts World Manila – Marriott Grand Ballroom, Pasay	Chris Botti featuring Sting: Up Close and Personal	
March 4–6	Various	Puerto Galera	Malasimbo Music & Arts Festival 2016	
March 5	Bon Iver and Death Cab for Cutie ft. Blackbird Blackbird, Chad Valley, Cheats, Commandeur, CRWN and Jess Connelly, Curtismith, Jensen and The Flips, The Naked and Famous, Oh, Flamingo!, Panama, and San Cisco	Globe Circuit Event Grounds, Makati	Wanderland Music and Arts Festival 2016	
March 12	Sergio Mendes	Smart Araneta Coliseum, Quezon City	50 Years of Celebration of Brazil '66	
March 12	5 Seconds of Summer	SM Mall of Asia Arena, Pasay	Sounds Live Feels Live Tour	
March 12	Richard Marx	Kia Theater, Quezon City	Richard Marx Live in Manila	
March 18	Alden Richards	Ynares Center, Antipolo	ALDENVasion	
March 22	Sarah Geronimo	Ilocos Norte Centennial Arena, Laoag	From the Top Tour	

=== April–June ===
Concert date(s)	Artist(s)	Venue(s)	Concert title/tour	Ref(s)
April 2	Il Divo	SM Mall of Asia Arena, Pasay	Amor & Pasion Tour 2016	
April 6	Melissa Manchester and David Pomeranz	Smart Araneta Coliseum, Quezon City	Manchester and Pomeranz Live: A Evening of Timeless Love Songs	
April 8	Hailee Steinfeld	Eastwood City, Quezon City	Hailee Steinfeld: Live!	
April 9	Hailee Steinfeld	Uptown Mall, Bonifacio Global City, Taguig	Hailee Steinfeld: Live!	
April 9	Various (incl. Kanye West, Rudimental, Afrojack and Austin Mahone)	Aseana City – Paradise Grounds, Parañaque	Paradise International Music Festival	
April 9	Kim Chiu	Kia Theatre, Quezon City	Chinita Princess: The FUNtasy Concert	
April 10	Hailee Steinfeld	The Venice Piazza, Taguig	Hailee Steinfeld: Live!	
April 16	Various (feat. Inner Circle and Big Mountain)	SM Mall of Asia Concert Grounds, Pasay	1st International Reggae Festival in Manila	
April 22	Sarah Geronimo	Island Cove Concert Park, Kawit, Cavite	From the Top Tour	
April 26	Andrea Bocelli	SM Mall of Asia Arena, Pasay	Cinema World Tour	
April 28	Copeland	SM City North EDSA – Skydome, Quezon City	Copeland by Request	
April 29	Sarah Geronimo	Alonte Sports Arena, Biñan	From the Top Tour	
April 30	Karla Estrada	Kia Theatre, Quezon City	Her Highness: The Queen Mother Live In Concert	
April 30	Various (incl. Pepe Smith, RJ Jacinto, Aiza Seguerra, Luke Mejares, Pido Lalimarmo, Jimmy Bondoc, Freddie Aguilar, Thor Dulay, Mocha Girls, K.O. Jones, The Brat Pack, Cesar Montano, Moymoy Palaboy, Junior Citizens Band, Climax, Davao Artists, Jerome Rico, Kris Angelica, Isay Alvarez, Robert Seña and Takbo Boys	McKinley Parkway Open Field, Bonifacio Global City, Taguig	Rock d' Avance: Free Concert for Rodrigo Duterte & Alan Peter Cayetano	
May 12	Of Monsters and Men	World Trade Center Metro Manila, Pasay	Of Monsters and Men Live in Manila	
May 14	Julie Anne San Jose	Kia Theatre, Quezon City	In Control	
May 19	The Sam Willows (feat. BP Valenzuela)	U.P. Town Center, Quezon City	Take Heart Tour	
May 20	Sarah Geronimo	Jesse M. Robredo Coliseum, Naga, Camarines Sur	From the Top Tour	
May 20	Little Mix (feat. The Sam Willows)	Kia Theatre, Quezon City	Get Weird Tour	
May 21	Various (incl. Dimitri Vegas & Like Mike, Goldfish & Blink, Julian Jordan, and MATTN)	SM Mall of Asia Concert Grounds, Pasay	Close-Up Forever Summer 2016	
May 24	Florence LaRue & The 5th Dimension	Smart Araneta Coliseum, Quezon City	Florence LaRue & The 5th Dimension Live in Manila: Celebrating 50 years of Music	
May 27	Jason Derulo (feat. Redfoo)	SM Mall of Asia Arena, Pasay	Jason Derulo World Tour	
May 27	Sarah Geronimo	Batangas Provincial Sports Complex, Batangas City	From the Top Tour	
June 4	Citipointe Live	CCF Center, Pasig	Citipointe Live Worship Concert	
June 13	Blessthefall	SM City North EDSA – Skydome, Quezon City	Blessthefall Live in Manila	
June 17	Culture Club	Smart Araneta Coliseum, Quezon City	Culture Club Featuring Boy George: Live in Manila!	
June 24	Various (incl. OneRepublic, Bebe Rexha, Apink, James Reid, and Nadine Lustre)	SM Mall of Asia Concert Grounds, Pasay	MTV Music Evolution Manila 2016	
June 24	Greyson Chance	Eastwood City, Quezon City	Greyson Chance: Live!	
June 25	Greyson Chance	The Venice Piazza, Taguig	Greyson Chance: Live!	
June 26	Greyson Chance	Uptown Bonifacio, Bonifacio Global City, Taguig	Greyson Chance: Live!	

=== July–September ===
Concert date(s)	Artist(s)	Venue(s)	Concert title/tour	Ref(s)
July 10	Engelbert Humperdinck	Smart Araneta Coliseum, Quezon City	Engelbert Humperdinck Live in Manila	
July 12	The Bootleg Beatles	Newport Performing Arts Theater, Resorts World Manila, Pasay	The Bootleg Beatles in Concert at Resorts World Manila: Commemorating 50 Years of Beatles Music	
July 30	BTS	SM Mall of Asia Arena, Pasay	2016 BTS LIVE The Most Beautiful Moment in Life on Stage: Epilogue	
July 31	Selena Gomez	SM Mall of Asia Arena, Pasay	Revival Tour	
August 11	Kenny Rogers	Smart Araneta Coliseum, Quezon City	The Gambler's Last Deal	
August 14	Charlie Puth	Kia Theatre, Quezon City	Nine Track Mind Tour	
August 14	Seventeen	The Theatre, Solaire Resort & Casino, Parañaque	The 1st Asia Tour: Shining Diamonds	
August 14	The Stylistics	Smart Araneta Coliseum, Quezon City	The Stylistics with The Main Ingredient featuring Cuba Gooding, Sr. Live in Manila	
August 18	Various (incl. The 1975, James Bay, Elle King, Panic! at the Disco, and Twin Pines)	SM Mall of Asia Arena, Pasay	In the Mix	
August 19	The Chainsmokers	SM Mall of Asia Arena, Pasay	The Chainsmokers Live in Manila	
August 26	Richard Poon and Richard Yap	The Theatre, Solaire Resort & Casino, Parañaque	Richard x Richard – The Chinito Crooners: A Salute to Classic Love Songs	
August 26 and 27	Ogie Alcasid	Music Museum, San Juan	Ayokong Tumanda	
September 17	Various (incl. Alesso, and Tiësto)^{Note 1}	SM Mall of Asia Arena, Pasay	Road to Ultra: Philippines	
September 17	Jason Dy	Skydome, SM City North EDSA	Breakthrough	
September 24	Pentatonix	Smart Araneta Coliseum, Quezon City	Pentatonix World Tour 2016	

Note 1. Hardwell was originally part of the lineup but cancelled his booking due to uncertain reasons.

=== October–December ===
Concert date(s)	Artist(s)	Venue(s)	Concert title/tour	Ref(s)
October 14	Vina Morales	Kia Theatre, Quezon City	Vina @ 30	
October 15	Ogie Alcasid	Music Museum, San Juan	Ayokong Tumanda: The Repeat	
October 23	A1	Kia Theatre, Quezon City	Here We Come-Back! Tour	
October 25	A1	International Eucharistic Congress Pavilion, Cebu City	Here We Come-Back! Tour	
November 5	The Dawn	Music Museum Greenhills, San Juan	Trenta/Repeat	
November 11	Kyla, Angeline Quinto, KZ Tandingan and Yeng Constantino^{Note 2}	Smart Araneta Coliseum, Quezon City	DIVAS Live in Manila	
November 21	Lucy Rose (feat. Fools and Foes)	12 Monkeys Music Hall and Pub, Century City Mall, Makati	Lucy Rose Live in Manila	
November 25	Jona	Kia Theatre, Quezon City	Queen of the Night: Jona	
December 1	Chairlift (feat. CRWN, Jess Connelly and BP Valenzuela)	Black Market, Makati	Chairlift Live in Manila	
December 8	December Avenue (feat. Gab and John of Urbandub, and Clara Benin)	Teatrino, Greenhills, San Juan City	December Avenue: Live	
December 9	DJ Snake	The Palace Pool Club, Uptown Bonifacio, Taguig	DJ Snake LIVE at the Palace Pool Club	
December 10	Various	B-Side, The Collective, Makati	Red Ninja Year-Ender Fest	
December 17	Ronnie Alonte	Kia Theatre, Quezon City	#KiligKing Concert	
December 17	Various	Route 196, Quezon City	The Rest is Noise Year-End 2016	
December 31	Various (incl. Phoebe Ryan)	Eastwood Mall, Quezon City	Eastwood City New Year Countdown 2017	

Note 2. Rachelle Ann Go was originally part of the lineup, but pulled out due to scheduling conflicts.

=== Cancelled events ===
Concert date(s)	Artist(s)	Venue(s)	Concert title/tour	Reason cited	Ref(s)
January 16	Maja Salvador (with Thou Reyes, Kakai Bautista, and Arjo Atayde)	Urdaneta Cultural Center & Sports Complex, Urdaneta, Pangasinan	Maja Limitless	Producers' "non-compliance" with requirements	
February 14	Gloria Gaynor	Kia Theater, Quezon City	Never Can Say Goodbye World Tour 2016	Internal problems	
February 20	Alden Richards, Jose & Wally, Ruru Madrid, Jon Lucas, Jerald Napoles	Philippine Arena, Bocaue, Bulacan	Sa Totoong Buhay Naman	Producer's decision	
April 2	Tom Jones	Smart Araneta Coliseum, Quezon City	Tom Jones Live in Manila	Due to serious illness in his immediate family	
October 26	Shawn Mendes	SM Mall of Asia Arena, Pasay	Shawn Mendes World Tour	Unforeseen circumstances (postponed to March 18, 2017)	

== Awarding ceremonies ==
- January 26 – 1st Wish 107.5 Music Awards, organized by Wish 1075
- March 15 – Myx Music Awards 2016, organized by myx
- August 7 – MOR Pinoy Music Awards 2016, organized by MOR 101.9 For Life!
- October 23 – 8th PMPC Star Awards for Music, organized by the Philippine Movie Press Club
- December 7 – 29th Awit Awards, organized by the Philippine Association of the Record Industry

== Deaths ==
August

- August 4 – Snaffu Rigor, veteran composer (b. 1947)
- November 21 – Blakdyak, singer, actor, comedian (b.1969)
