= Edray =

Edray may refer to:

- Edray Herber Goins, American mathematician
- Edray Teodoro, Filipino singer
  - Edray (album), 2017 album by Edray Teodoro
- Edray, West Virginia

== See also ==
- Edward Ray (disambiguation)
