= Tanya Markova =

Filipino rock band

- Origin: Manila, Philippines
- Genres: OPM/Pinoy rock, indie rock, pop rock, gothic rock, shock rock, alternative rock, comedy rock
- Years active: 2006–present
- Labels: MCA Music (2010–2014); Tower of Doom (present)
- Members: Angelo "Gel" del Pilar (Iwa Motors); Florante "Rhan" Sabas (Rez Curtis); Francis "Kix" Chavez (Skrovak Iskopanjo); Oliver "Ole" Romblon (Isabel Olé); John Paul "Japo" Anareta (Robot Jaworski); Levi Arago (Levy Poe)
- Past members: Harlon Agsaoay (Norma Love); Philipp Jertie "Pipoy" Alejandro (Mowmow); EJ "Kid" Guevarra (Jennylyn Sucaldito); Jasper "Jass" Borbajo (Heart Abunda); Edson "Edu" Broce (Rufa Mae Milby); Brian Lotho (Sam Quinto); Jollybee "Jbee" Borbajo (Sugar K.)

Tanya Markova is a Filipino rock band formed in the indie scene in 2006 and went mainstream in 2010. The band is currently composed of Angelo del Pilar (vocals), Rhan Sabas (rhythm guitar), Kix Chavez (bass), Ole Romblon (lead guitar, vocals), Japo Anareta (keyboards, vocals), and Levy Arago (drums). The band is recognizable due to their makeup and costumes, with each member having an onstage persona.

== History ==
=== Formation ===
Tanya Markova was formed in 2002 by San Beda University classmates Harlon Agsaoay and Gel del Pilar. Del Pilar immediately thought of an idea to combine sappy melodies and dark caricature-driven lyrics, then they decided to compose songs filled with sarcasm, idiocy, and childish ramblings. During those times the song they have created were only meant to be a joke with nonsensical titles. It took several months before they could find members who would agree to their concept, and almost 2 years to complete the line-up and perform live onstage. The said members originally hail from Bacolod, San Carlos City (Negros Occidental), Isabela, Leyte and some in Metro Manila.

=== Tragedy and hiatus ===
The band was on their lowest point on September 9, 2009 due to the unexpected death of lead guitarist Jollybee "Jbee" Borbajo a.k.a. Sugar K. in a freak vacation accident together with actor and friend Dennis Trillo. Due to this sudden loss, the band declared a hiatus in order to deal with the emotional experience and to think about the band's direction. In December 2009, Kid Guevarra went back to Manila to play lead guitar for Tanya Markova once again. He was actually Tanya Markova’s original guitarist (Sugar K. previously played drums before switching to guitars when Rufa Mae Milby decided to join) and was able to play in a few gigs and became involved on Tanya Markova’s first few demos but he decided to go back to Bacolod due to personal and work reasons. When Sugar K. (who was also originally from Bacolod) died, he was the only guitarist on their mind that could fill his shoes. Kid Guevarra decided to don the Jennylyn Sucaldito suit again.

=== MCA Music, Tanya Markova, and present status (2010–present) ===
On January 19, 2010 the band were signed by MCA Music Philippines (whose OPM line-up includes top brass artists like Chicosci, Urbandub, Pedicab, The Dawn and Franco among others). On April 12, 2010, the band released their self-titled debut album Tanya Markova under MCA Music. They have released the singles "Picture Picture", "Disney", and "Linda Blair". After a few changes in their lineup, the band still continues to release music online.

== Band's name ==
The band got their name from Filipina actress Tanya Garcia and the last name from Dolphy's bakla movie character, Markova. It's also a coincidence that an anagram of "Tanya Markova" is "Natay Karovam/Natay Karubam", an Ilocano word meaning "Dead Neighbor". The concept of the members' stage names is inspired by the band Marilyn Manson whose early members combined the names of notable personalities to form their own stage names.

== Members ==
- Iwa Motors – co-lead vocals, occasional additional guitar
- Rez Curtis – rhythm guitar; additional backing vocals (since 2023)
- Skrovak Iskopanjo – bass guitar
- Isabel Olé – lead guitar; backing vocals (since 2023)
- Robot Jaworski (aka "Android E") – keyboard synthesizer, backing vocals; co-lead vocals (since 2023)
- Levy Poe – drums, percussion

=== Former members ===
- Norma Love – lead vocals (on indefinite hiatus since 2023)
- Mowmow – tambourine, percussion, backing vocals (on indefinite hiatus since 2024)
- Jennylyn Sucaldito – lead guitar
- Heart Abunda – keyboard synthesizer
- Rufa Mae Milby – drums
- Sam Quinto – drums
- Sugar K† (deceased) – lead guitar

==== Touring members ====
- Jun Paredes (Jun Tovera) – bass guitar
- Kenneth B. Reached (Kenneth Floria) – bass guitar

== Discography ==
=== Studio albums ===
- Tanya Markova (2010)
- Tanya Markova Shock Pop Edition (2012)
- Mister Tililing (2016)
- Ang Mga Awitin ng Normal na Tao (Full Album) (2024)

=== EP ===
- Ang mga Awitin ng Normal na Tao (2021)

=== Singles ===
- "Picture Picture"
- "Disney"
- "Linda Blair"
- "P.A. Roadie Fernandez"
- "Da Facebook Song"
- "Jacuzzi"
- "Creep"
- "Hello Hello Hello"
- "Ang Darling Kong Zombie"
- "High-End"
- "Iglap"
- "Stranded"
- "Bituin"
- "Medusa"
- "Tear Gas"
- "Hulog"
- "Tear Gas (2024)"
- "Beautiful AIs"
- "Paging 1997"
- "Panalangin"

=== Music videos ===
- "Picture Picture"
- "Disney"
- "Linda Blair"
- "P.A. Roadie Fernandez"
- "Da Facebook Song"
- "Jacuzzi"
- "Hello Hello Hello"
- "Ang Darling Kong Zombie"
- "High-End"
- "Iglap"
- "Stranded"
- "Bituin"
- "Hulog"

== Awards and nominations ==
Year	Award giving body	Category	Nominated work	Results
2010	Monster Radio RX 93.1	OPM Band of the Year	—N/a	Won
2010	Monster Radio RX 93.1	New Artist of the Year	—N/a	Won
2010	NU Rock Awards	Best New Artist	—N/a	Won
2010	NU Rock Awards	Best Live Act	—N/a	Won
2010	NU Rock Awards	Best Music Video	"Disney"	Won
2010	NU Rock Awards	Artist of the Year	—N/a	Nominated
2010	NU Rock Awards	Album of the Year	"Tanya Markova"	Nominated
2010	NU Rock Awards	Song of the Year	"Picture Picture"	Nominated
2010	NU Rock Awards	Guitarist of the Year	(for Kid Guevarra, Rhan Sabas and Jbee Borbajo)	Nominated
2011	Awit Awards	Best Performance by a Group of Recording Artists	"Picture Picture"	Nominated
2011	Awit Awards	Best Performance by a New Group of Recording Artists	"Picture Picture"	Nominated
2011	Awit Awards	Music Video of the Year	"Disney"	Nominated
2011	MYX Music Awards	Favorite New Artist	—N/a	Won
2011	MYX Music Awards	Favorite Music Video	"Disney"	Nominated
2011	MYX Music Awards	Favorite Song	"Disney"	Nominated
2011	MYX Music Awards	Favorite MYX Live Performance	—N/a	Nominated
2012	PMPC Star Awards For Music	Male Rock Artist of the Year	—N/a	Nominated
2012	PMPC Star Awards For Music	Music Video of the Year		Nominated
