= Gabby Alipe =

Filipino singer-songwriter (born 1979)

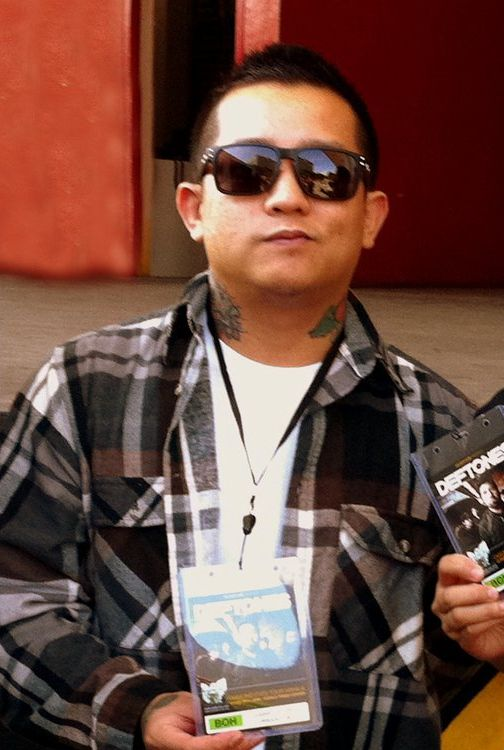
- Alipe in 2011

Background information
- Born: Gabby Alipe; October 13, 1979 (age 47)
- Origin: Cebu, Philippines
- Genres: Alternative rock; hard rock; experimental rock; OPM
- Occupations: Musician; songwriter
- Instruments: Vocals; guitar
- Years active: 2000–present (as a band); 2016–present (as solo artist)
- Labels: PolyEast; MCA Music; Tower of Doom
- Member of: Urbandub
- Formerly of: Franco

Gabby Alipe (born October 13, 1979) is a Filipino musician and songwriter. He known as the frontman and rhythm guitarist of the rock band Urbandub, which formed in 2000. He was also a co-founder and guitarist of the band Franco from 2008 until his departure in 2012. In 2016, Alipe began his solo career and released his debut extended play (EP) A New Strain under MCA Music.

== Early life ==
Alipe was born on October 13, 1979 and hails from Cebu, Philippines. He is the eldest of nine siblings and the son of author Lollétte-Oliva Alipe and Em Alipe. His parents reunited after five years of separation.

== Career ==
=== Urbandub ===
Alipe began his music career during high school, initially seeing himself as a guitarist and songwriter rather than a vocalist. During his college years in Cebu, he played bass in various local bands. After one of his former groups declined to perform original material, he formed a new band with friend Jed Honrado. Due to the lack of available vocalists, Alipe assumed the role of lead singer. This led to the formation of Urbandub, with Alipe serving as both frontman and rhythm guitarist.

The band released their debut album, Birth (2001). Although the album achieved success in Cebu. Their breakthrough came with the release of second album Influence (2003), which received critical acclaim and commercial success. The album earned them two trophies at the NU107 Rock Awards 2003: Album of the Year and Song of the Year for the single "Soul Searching".

His band went on to release several more albums, including Embrace (2005), Under Southern Lights (2007), The Apparition (2009), and Esoteric (2013).

=== Franco ===
In 2008, Alipe became part of the supergroup Franco, which included members from prominent Filipino rock bands such as Jan-Jan Mendoza (Urbandub), Buwi Meneses (Parokya ni Edgar), Paolo Toleran (Queso), and frontman Franco Reyes. While the band was often seen as a "side project" due to its members' commitments to their respective groups. In 2010, the group released their self-titled debut album under MCA Music.

He remained with the band until 2012, when he left the band to pursue other musical and personal projects. Around the same time, Buwi Meneses, Paolo Toleran, and Jan-Jan Mendoza also departed from the group.

=== Solo career and other projects ===
Following his tenure with Urbandub, Alipe explored work behind the scenes, managing bands such as Autotelic, Faspitch, Cables & Space, Sirens and Faintlight under his company Nemesis Music Group. Despite initially being hesitant to return to performing, he eventually re-entered the music scene as a solo artist.

In 2016, he released his debut extended play (EP) A New Strain under MCA Music and produced by Eric Perlas. The EP contains six tracks written by him, including the lead single "Visions", which reached number one on the Spotify Philippines Viral 50 chart a week after its release. The EP also debuted in the Top 5 of the iTunes Philippines album chart on the day of its release.

== Personal life ==
Alipe has been in a long-term relationship with former VJ aspirant and model-entrepreneur Erika Hocson. In 2012, they welcomed their first child.

== Accolades ==
Award	Year	Category	Recipient(s)	Result	Ref.
NU Rock Awards	2006	Vocalist of the Year	Gabby Alipe	Won	
NU Rock Awards	2006	Best Male Award	Gabby Alipe	Nominated	
NU Rock Awards	2008	Vocalist of the Year	Gabby Alipe	Nominated	
NU Rock Awards	2010	Vocalist of the Year	Gabby Alipe	Won	
Awit Awards	2017	Best Performance by a Male Recording Artist	"Visions"	Won	
Awit Awards	2017	Best Rock/Alternative Recording	"Visions"	Won	

== Discography ==
=== With Urbandub ===
- Birth (2001)
- Influence (2003)
- Embrace (2005)
- Under Southern Lights (2007)
- The Apparition (2009)

=== With Franco ===
- Franco (2010)

=== As a solo artist ===
- EP
  - A New Strain (2016), MCA Music
- Singles
  - "Visions" (2016), MCA Music
  - "Guillotine" (2019), MCA Music
  - "Hindi Alam" (2019), MCA Music
  - "Sun and Moon" (2021), Tower of Doom
  - "Fragile and Human" (2021), Tower of Doom
  - "Watawat" (2022), Tower of Doom
  - "Some Time Away" (2022), Tower of Doom
  - "Heartless" (2023), Tower of Doom

=== Collaborations ===
- "Balita" – with Gloc-9 (2009)
- "Better Days" - composed with Franco from the album Soul Adventurer (2013)
- "Hark the Herald Angels Sing" – with John Dinopol and The Ransom Collective (2017)
- "Caution to the Wind" – with John Dinopol and The Ransom Collective (2017)
- "Fools" – with John Dinopol (2017)
- "Run" – with Greyhoundz (2024)
