= List of MYX number one music videos of 2017 =

Myx is a music channel in the Philippines that shows different music videos, domestically and internationally. Every week, its MYX Hit Chart presents the Top 20 most requested music videos voted by people on their website.

== Chart history ==
Key
| † | Number One Music Video of 2017 |

| Issue date | Music Video | Artist(s) | Ref. |
|---|---|---|---|
| January 8 | "Alam Mo Ba" | Elmo Magalona and Janella Salvador | |
| January 15 | "Alam Mo Ba" | Elmo Magalona and Janella Salvador | |
| January 22 | "Alam Mo Ba" | Elmo Magalona and Janella Salvador | |
| January 29 | "Unli" | BoybandPH | |
| February 5 | "Unli" | BoybandPH | |
| February 12 | "Unli" | BoybandPH | |
| February 19 | "Kaibigan Mo" | Sarah Geronimo featuring Yeng Constantino | |
| February 26 | "Kaibigan Mo" | Sarah Geronimo featuring Yeng Constantino | |
| March 5 | "Kaibigan Mo" | Sarah Geronimo featuring Yeng Constantino | |
| March 12 | "Somebody" | BoybandPH | |
| March 19 | "Somebody" | BoybandPH | |
| March 26 | "Sa'yo Pa Rin" | Glaiza de Castro | |
| April 2 | "Sa'yo Pa Rin" | Glaiza de Castro | |
| April 9 | "Beauty and the Beast" | Ariana Grande and John Legend | |
| April 16 | "I'll Be There" | Darren Espanto and Jed Madela | |
| April 23 | "I'll Be There" | Darren Espanto and Jed Madela | |
| April 30 | "I'll Be There" | Darren Espanto and Jed Madela | |
| May 7 | "I'll Be There" | Darren Espanto and Jed Madela | |
| May 14 | "I'll Be There" | Darren Espanto and Jed Madela | |
| May 21 | "Sign of the Times" | Harry Styles | |
| May 28 | "Sign of the Times" | Harry Styles | |
| June 4 | "Walang Dahilan" | Gimme 5 | |
| June 11 | "Kung Pwede Lang" | Alexa Ilacad | |
| June 18 | "Kung Pwede Lang" | Alexa Ilacad | |
| June 25 | "Cool Down" | James Reid | |
| July 2 | "Cool Down" | James Reid | |
| July 9 | "Cool Down" | James Reid | |
| July 16 | "Cool Down" | James Reid | |
| July 23 | "Cool Down" | James Reid | |
| July 30 | "Cool Down" | James Reid | |
| August 6 | "Cool Down" | James Reid | |
| August 13 | "Cool Down" | James Reid | |
| August 20 | "Cool Down" | James Reid | |
| August 27 | "Cool Down" | James Reid | |
| September 3 | "Cool Down" | James Reid | |
| September 10 | "Look What You Made Me Do" | Taylor Swift | |
| September 17 | "Look What You Made Me Do" | Taylor Swift | |
| September 24 | "Look What You Made Me Do" | Taylor Swift | |
| October 1 | "Look What You Made Me Do" | Taylor Swift | |
| October 8 | "Look What You Made Me Do" | Taylor Swift | |
| October 15 | "Look What You Made Me Do" | Taylor Swift | |
| October 22 | "Look What You Made Me Do" | Taylor Swift | |
| October 29 | "Turning Up" | James Reid | |
| November 5 | "Turning Up" | James Reid | |
| November 12 | "Turning Up" | James Reid | |
| November 19 | "Black Suit" | Super Junior | |
| November 26 | "Black Suit" | Super Junior | |
| December 3 | "Black Suit" | Super Junior | |
| December 10 | "Black Suit" | Super Junior | |
| December 17 | "Black Suit" | Super Junior | |
| December 24 | "Perfect" | Ed Sheeran | |

== Chart history of Myx International Top 20 ==
| Issue date | Music Video | Artist(s) |
|---|---|---|
| January 7 | "All Night" | The Vamps featuring Matoma |
| January 14 | "All Night" | The Vamps featuring Matoma |
| January 21 | "Million Reasons" | Lady Gaga |
| January 28 | "We Are" | One Ok Rock |
| February 4 | "We Are" | One Ok Rock |
| February 11 | "We Are" | One Ok Rock |
| February 18 | "We Are" | One Ok Rock |
| February 25 | "We Are" | One Ok Rock |
| March 4 | "Chained To The Rhythm" | Katy Perry |
| March 11 | "Chained To The Rhythm" | Katy Perry |
| March 18 | "Chained To The Rhythm" | Katy Perry |
| March 25 | "Touch" | Little Mix |
| April 1 | "Touch" | Little Mix |
| April 8 | "Beauty and the Beast" | Ariana Grande and John Legend |
| April 15 | "Beauty and the Beast" | Ariana Grande and John Legend |
| April 22 | "No More Sad Songs" | Little Mix featuring Machine Gun Kelly |
| April 29 | "No More Sad Songs" | Little Mix featuring Machine Gun Kelly |
| May 6 | "No More Sad Songs" | Little Mix featuring Machine Gun Kelly |
| May 13 | "No More Sad Songs" | Little Mix featuring Machine Gun Kelly |
| May 20 | "Sign of the Times" | Harry Styles |
| May 27 | "Sign of the Times" | Harry Styles |
| June 3 | "Sign of the Times" | Harry Styles |
| June 10 | "Middle Of The Night" | The Vamps and Martin Jensen |
| June 17 | "Slow Hands" | Niall Horan |
| June 24 | "Down" | Fifth Harmony featuring Gucci Mane |
| July 1 | "Power" | Little Mix featuring Stormzy |
| July 8 | "Power" | Little Mix featuring Stormzy |
| July 15 | "Power" | Little Mix featuring Stormzy |
| July 22 | "Power" | Little Mix featuring Stormzy |
| July 29 | "Power" | Little Mix featuring Stormzy |
| August 5 | "Power" | Little Mix featuring Stormzy |
| August 12 | "Cherry Bomb" | NCT 127 |
| August 19 | "Cherry Bomb" | NCT 127 |
| August 26 | "Sorry Not Sorry" | Demi Lovato |
| September 2 | "Look What You Made Me Do" | Taylor Swift |
| September 9 | "Look What You Made Me Do" | Taylor Swift |
| September 16 | "Look What You Made Me Do" | Taylor Swift |
| September 23 | "Look What You Made Me Do" | Taylor Swift |
| September 30 | "Look What You Made Me Do" | Taylor Swift |
| October 7 | "Look What You Made Me Do" | Taylor Swift |
| October 14 | "Look What You Made Me Do" | Taylor Swift |
| October 21 | "Look What You Made Me Do" | Taylor Swift |
| October 28 | "Look What You Made Me Do" | Taylor Swift |
| November 4 | "Havana" | Camila Cabello feat. Young Thug |
| November 11 | "Havana" | Camila Cabello feat. Young Thug |
| November 18 | "Black Suit" | Super Junior |
| November 25 | "Black Suit" | Super Junior |
| December 2 | "Black Suit" | Super Junior |
| December 9 | "Black Suit" | Super Junior |

== See also ==
- 2017 in Philippine music
- Myx Music Awards 2017
