= I'll Be Seeing You =

I'll Be Seeing You may refer to:

== Film and television ==
- I'll Be Seeing You (2004 film), a TV movie based on the novel by Mary Higgins Clark
- I'll Be Seeing You (1944 film), a 1944 movie starring Joseph Cotten, Ginger Rogers, and Shirley Temple
- "I'll Be Seeing You", a two-part episode of the television series Cheers

== Theatre ==
- I'll Be Seeing You (play), a 2026 play about Liberace

== Music ==
- "I'll Be Seeing You" (song), a popular song published in 1938 with music by Sammy Fain and lyrics by Irving Kahal featured as title track on many of the albums below
- I'll Be Seeing You (Anne Murray album), 2004
- I'll Be Seeing You (Jo Stafford album), 1959
- I'll Be Seeing You (Etta Jones album), 1987
- I'll Be Seeing You (Richard Poon album), 2010
- I'll Be Seeing You, a 2009 album by Kieran Goss
- I'll Be Seeing You: A Sentimental Journey, a 2006 album by Regina Carter
- I'll Be Seeing You: A Sentimental Collection, a 1999 album by Beryl Davis

== Literature ==
- I'll Be Seeing You, a 1996 novel by Lurlene McDaniel
- I'll Be Seeing You, a 1994 novel by Kristine Rolofson
- I'll Be Seeing You, a 1993 novel by Mary Higgins Clark
- I'll Be Seeing You: Poems 1962-1976, an anthology of poems by Larry Fagin

== See also ==
- Be Seeing You, a 1977 music album by Dr. Feelgood
- "Be seeing you", a valediction frequently used in the TV series The Prisoner
