= Edray (album) =

2017 studio album by Edray Teodoro

Studio album by Edray Teodoro
- Released: April 28, 2017
- Genre: Pop
- Length: 34:45
- Label: MCA Music Philippines
- Producer: Francis "Kiko" Guevarra

Edray is the debut studio album by Filipino singer Edray Teodoro, released in 2017 by MCA Music Philippines. The album was released on April 28, 2017, and includes the singles "Puedepende", "Bwelo Lang" and "Wala Lang", as well as Teodoro's recording of "How Far I'll Go" from the Disney animated film Moana.

== Background and release ==
Teodoro was a semi-finalist on the first season of The Voice Kids Philippines, where she competed as a member of Bamboo Mañalac's team. After the competition, she signed with MCA Music Philippines and recorded her debut album.

"Puedepende", written by Jungee Marcelo, was released before the album. The song earned Teodoro a nomination for Best Performance by a New Female Recording Artist at the 29th Awit Awards. "Bwelo Lang", a duet with fellow Voice Kids contestant Juan Karlos Labajo, was also released before the album.

In March 2017, Teodoro released a cover of "How Far I'll Go", written by Lin-Manuel Miranda for Moana. Inquirer's POP! reported that Teodoro had become an MCA Music recording artist and that "Wala Lang", her third single, was from her forthcoming self-titled album.

"Wala Lang" was released on March 17, 2017. Edray followed on April 28.

The album later received international exposure through Emirates' in-flight entertainment system. In November 2017, Edray was featured in the "New Asia" music selection of the airline's ice entertainment guide, which described the album as Teodoro's debut and noted her earlier appearance on The Voice Kids.

== Track listing ==
Edray track listing
No.	Title	Writer(s)	Length
1	"Wala Lang"	Jude Gitamondoc	4:15
2	"What You Doin' Tonight"	Roxanne Seeman, Tinashe Sibanda, Melody Noel Hernandez	3:40
3	"La La Lang"	Edray Teodoro	2:44
4	"Bwelo Lang" (featuring Juan Karlos Labajo)	Jungee Marcelo	3:55
5	"Puedepende"	Jungee Marcelo	3:32
6	"Tulak Ng Bibig, Kabig Ng Dibdib"	Julianne Tarroja	4:35
7	"Beautiful"	Linda Perry	4:01
8	"Wala Lang" (acoustic)	Jude Gitamondoc	5:09
9	"How Far I'll Go"	Lin-Manuel Miranda	2:54

Songwriting credits adapted from AllMusic.

== Personnel ==
- Edray Teodoro – vocals
- Juan Karlos Labajo – featured vocals on "Bwelo Lang"
- Francis "Kiko" Guevarra – production
