= Fresh Filter: Volume 1 =

Compilation album by Various Artists
- Released: May 22, 2015
- Genre: OPM; Indie pop; Alternative pop; Indie rock; Synthpop
- Producer: Russ Davis

Fresh Filter: Volume 1 is a compilation album of OPM songs by various local indie music acts that heard on Jam 88.3's supplemental program Fresh Filter. The compilation album is a joint project of Jam 88.3 and local vinyl retailer Satchmi, and is produced by the show's host Russ Davis.

It is composed of 12 tracks (in a 2-disc vinyl set) which are performed by local and unsigned Filipino indie music artists/bands (A Problem Like Maria, Autotelic, B.P. Valenzuela, Bullet Dumas, Cheats, Flying Ipis, Library Kids, Moonwlk, Ourselves the Elves, Tandems' 91, The Ransom Collective, and Yolanda Moon).

== Track listing ==
Side A
No.	Title	Artist	Length
1.	"Misteryoso"	Autotelic
2.	"Love Like"	A Problem Like Maria
3.	"A Quiet Walk Outside"	Library Kids
4.	"I Wouldn't Mind"	Ourselves the Elves
5.	"Fools"	The Ransom Collective
6.	"Over and Over Again"	Flying Ipis

Side B
No.	Title	Artist	Length
7.	"PSSST!"	Bullet Dumas
8.	"Accidents"	Cheats
9.	"At Last"	Tandems' 91
10.	"Irish"	Moonwlk
11.	"Pretty Car"	B.P. Valenzuela
12.	"Pasensya"	Yolanda Moon
