= Ted Ray =

Ted Ray may refer to:

- Ted Ray (comedian) (Charlie Olden, 1905–1977), British comedian
- Ted Ray (golfer) (Edward Ray, 1877–1943), British golfer

== See also ==
- Ted Wray, Canadian politician
- Edward Ray (disambiguation)
