= Edward Ray =

Edward Ray may refer to:

- Ed Ray (academic) (born 1944), American economist and academic administrator
- Ted Ray (golfer) (1877–1943), British professional golfer
- Eddie Ray (born 1947), former professional American football player
- Frank Edward "Ed" Ray (1921–2012), American bus driver who saved a group of students during the 1976 Chowchilla kidnapping
- Edward Wiley Ray (1926–2026), American record company executive, record producer and songwriter

== See also ==
- Edward Wray, Groom of the Bedchamber to James I
- Ted Ray (disambiguation)
