= MilesExperience =

Filipino rock band

- Origin: Manila, Philippines
- Genres: Rock
- Years active: 2011-Present
- Labels: MCA Music Inc.
- Members: Jose Thomas “Miles” Bondoc Timothy Dadivas (Odulio); Justin Teaño; Guido Hizon Ian Diaz
- Past members: Jonnel Pallasigui
- Website: MilesExperience on Facebook

Milesexperience (stylized as MilesExperience and sometimes shortened as Msex) is a Filipino rock band from Manila, Philippines. Formed in 2011, the band consists of Jose Thomas “Miles” Bondoc on vocals and guitars, Ian Lorenzo Diaz on bass, Justin Teaño on guitars, Guido Hizon on Keyboards and Timothy Dadivas (Odulio) on drums.

== History ==
=== Formation (2011–2015) ===
The band was formed within the halls of the University of Santo Tomas - Conservatory of Music. The members were enrolled on different programs and was originally made up of four members: Miles Bondoc on vocals and guitar, Tim Dadivas (Odulio) on drums, Jonnel Pallasigui on bass, and Justin Teaño on guitar. The band started out as a blues rock outfit and played gigs around the metro. A year later, Guido Hizon joined the group to play the Keyboard. They competed on the First Philippine Blues Competition held on The Roadhouse Manila, year 2012.

Months later, Jonnel left the band for good and was replaced by Ian Diaz to play bass. The band, dissatisfied with their music, almost broke up but went on a hiatus from 2013 to early 2014 instead. Wishing to find and better express themselves through their music, they revamped their sound and image in 2014 into something unique, something barely heard of in the local music scene, something they felt was their own.

=== Major label signing and debut album (2016–present) ===
In August 2016, the band was signed by MCA Music Philippines. Their debut album, Again and Against, re-released under MCA Music Records with the bonus song Anggulo.

On February 14, 2017, one of the Philippines' top TV networks, GMA Network announced via their official Twitter account that MilesExperience's song Anggulo was chosen as the main theme song for the Philippine broadcast of British-German fantasy teen drama television series, Wolfblood.

== Band members ==
=== Current members ===
- Jose Thomas “Miles” Bondoc – lead vocals, guitar (2011–present)
- Timothy Dadivas (Odulio) – drums, percussion (2011–present)
- Justin Teaño – lead guitar (2011–present)
- Guido Hizon – keyboards (2012–present)
- Ian Diaz – bass guitar, backing vocals (2014–present)

=== Past members ===
- Jonnel Pallasigui – bass guitar (2011–2013)

== Discography ==
- Again and Against (2016) (Re-released by MCA Music Inc. with one new song)
- Soberhaul (2017) by MCA Music Inc.
- Cyber World War (2019) by MilesExperience

== Singles ==
Year	Title	Charting		
Year	Title	Spotify Viral Top 50 Philippines	MYX Countdown Charts	Jam 88.3's 2015 Year-End Countdown
2017	Sunshine	1	8	-
2017	Love Supreme	-	-	-
2017	Silakbo	-	13	8
2017	Anggulo	-	8	-

== Music videos ==
Year	Title	Director
2017	Silakbo	Jiggy Gregorio
2017	Love Supreme	Jiggy Gregorio
2017	Anggulo	Jiggy Gregorio

== Awards and nominations ==
Year	Award	Category	Notable Works	Result	References
2017	MYX Music Awards 2017	MYX Favorite New Artist		Nominated	
2017	30th Awit Award	Best Performance by a Group Recording Artist	Love Supreme	Pending	
2017	30th Awit Award	Best Performance by a New Group Recording Artists	Silakbo	Pending	
2017	30th Awit Award	Best Rock/Alternative Recording	Love Supreme	Pending	
