= Volts Vallejo =

Filipino songwriter and recording artist (born 1991)

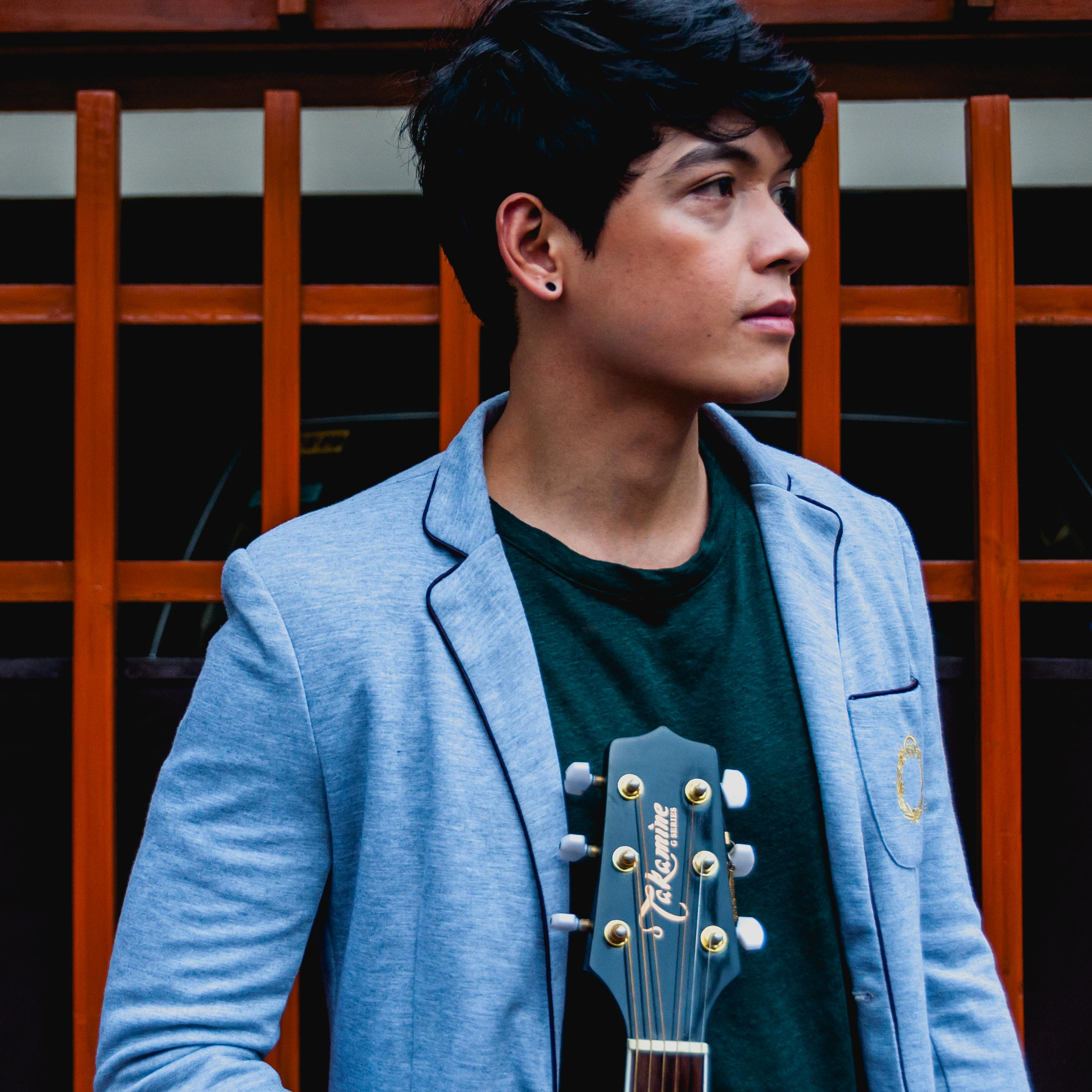
- Born: Voltaire Calahi Vallejo; San Jose City, Nueva Ecija, Philippines
- Occupation: • Singer-songwriter
- Years active: 2016–present
- Website: Volts Vallejo on Facebook

Voltaire Calahi Vallejo, simply known as Volts Vallejo, is a Filipino songwriter and recording artist who rose to popularity when his song "Hey Crush" was chosen as the official theme song for the Metro Manila Film Festival movie Vince & Kath & James under Star Cinema.

== Early life ==
Volts was born in Nueva Ecija, Philippines to Rodolfo and Zenaida Vallejo on October 23, 1991. Volts started out as a dancer and a commercial model before learning how to play the guitar and composing songs.

== Musical career ==
Volts started his musical career on YouTube, posting vlogs and song covers on his own channel. He was later discovered by a local online music hub and discovery site. Volts big break happened when he submitted his song "Hey Crush" to Star Cinema. The song was released on 2016 as his first single. A version of the song was also released by Star Music with Star Magic talent Joshua Garcia lending his vocals to the song.

Volts became the first signed artist of One Music PH. He recorded his self-titled EP in March 2017, with famed local record producer Roque Santos producing the EP. The self-titled EP was released on June 14, 2017, with "Tatapangan" serving as his first single.

== Discography ==
Album
Year	Album title	Recording label	Certification	Ref.
2017	Volts Vallejo EP	One Music PH	TBA	

=== Singles ===
Year	Song title	Album	Composer	Company
2016	Hey Crush	Hey Crush	Volts Vallejo	Star Music
2017	Tatapangan	Volts Vallejo EP	Volts Vallejo	One Music PH
2018	Anuna	Volts Vallejo EP	Volts Vallejo	One Music PH

== Awards and nominations ==
Year	Film Awards/Critics	Award	Nominated work	Result
2016	Metro Manila Film Festival	Best Movie Theme Song	"Hey Crush"	Nominated
