= Rave Radio =

Australian musical duo

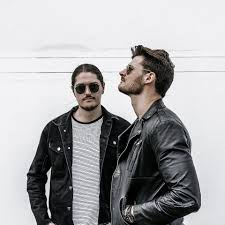
- From left: Brett Allen, James Todman

Background information
- Origin: Gold Coast, Queensland, Australia
- Genres: EDM, trap, dubstep
- Instrument: Drum, piano, guitar
- Years active: 2008–present
- Labels: Ones to Watch; Hype; Central Station/Universal; Moon Records; Vicious; Club Cartel; Armada
- Members: Brett Allen; James Todman

Rave Radio are an Australian electronic dance music duo formed in Queensland in 2008 by DJs and producers, Brett Allen and James Todman. They play a combination of live drum, live vocals, live sampling and mixing up with bass heavy genres. During 2013 they performed 100 shows across 11 countries. They were listed at No. 16 on the inthemix National Top 50 DJs.

Rave Radio have a combined 18 million plays of their tracks on Facebook and have an international fan base. Since the release of Rumble in 2015, they have attracted support from Martin Garrix, Hardwell, David Guetta, Dyro and Laidback Luke.

== History ==
Rave Radio's members, Brett Allen and James Todman, were both studying music at SAE Institute, Gold Coast, when they met. The duo started playing electronic dance music (EDM) together in 2008, and explained their band name, "its a bit deceiving isn't it! We don't play rave music and we're not a radio station haha. We were young and thought it sounded cool and catchy. We stuck with it so have given the name its own identity."

In mid-2010 they provided a remix for Bombs Away's "Big Booty Bitches", which reached No. 23 on the ARIA Club Tracks. Their charting remixes for 2011 are, Stanton Warriors' "Get Up" (April) at No. 5, "Get It Hot" (July) by Rave Radio vs Jolyon Petch featuring I.T. at No. 31, and Bombs Away's "Super Soaker" (October) at No. 10.

Rave Radio issued a single, "Make It Rain" featuring Xamplify, via Central Station Records/Universal Music Australia in May 2012, which was co-written by Allen and Todman with Kwabena Agyei. It peaked at No. 22 on the ARIA Club Tracks. They followed in September with "Botanical", which reached No. 37; and then "Shake Dat" (November 2012), which made No. 17.

During 2013 they issued "One Mind One Heart" (February) as a single, and then provided a remix version of "Hello" by Stafford Brothers featuring Lil Wayne and Christina Milian, which reached No. 1 on the ARIA Club Tracks. In October of that year they issued another single, "Feel the Love", working with Chris Willis, which reached No. 13 on the Club Tracks. It was co-written by Allen, Todman, Willis and Ronald Haryanto; a version was remixed by Nick Skitz. For the inthemix awards of 2013, Rave Radio was listed at No. 16 in the National Top 50 DJs, while in 2015 they were No. 46 for the People's Choice.

In early 2014 they signed with the Ones to Watch Records for international releases and, together with Central Station Records/Universal Music Australia for local product, they provided "Rumble" in July. Another single, "Mugatu" (November), was issued by Rave Radio and Zoolanda (Michael Zuidland), which reached No. 6 on the Club Tracks. During that year the EDM duo toured the United States and Brazil.

They released a song in 2018 "Make it Better" with Vicious recordings Label and FT. GO COMET! Collaborated with Rave Radio

== Discography ==
- The Chant (2014)
- Blackout (2014)

=== Singles ===
- "Make It Rain" featuring Xamplify (May 2012) – Central Station Records/Universal Music Australia. ARIA Club: No. 22
- "Botanical" (September 2012) – Central Station Records/Universal Music Australia. ARIA Club: No. 37
- "Shake Dat" (November 2012) – Central Station Records/Universal Music Australia. ARIA Club: No. 17
- "One Heart One Mind" (February 2013) – Central Station Records/Universal Music Australia. ARIA Club: No. 18
- "Let's Go" (by Mobin Master, Rave Radio & Tate Strauss) (April 2013) – Central Station Records/Universal Music Australia. ARIA Club: No. 18
- "Feel the Love" (by Rave Radio & Chris Willis) (October 2013) – Central Station Records/Universal Music Australia. ARIA Club: No. 13
- "Pump Fiction" (March 2014) – Central Station Records/Universal Music Australia. ARIA Club: No. 30
- "Rumble" (July 2014) – Central Station Records/Universal Music Australia, Ones to Watch Records/Mixmash Records. (OTW068) ARIA Club: No. 30
- "Mugatu" (by Rave Radio & Zoolanda) (November 2014) – Central Station Records/Universal Music Australia. ARIA Club: No. 6
