= Richard Poon =

Chinese Filipino singer-songwriter and TV personality

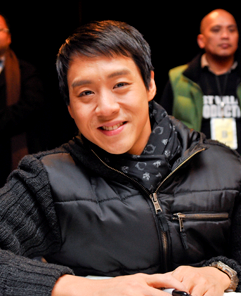

Background information
- Born: December 8, 1973 (age 52); Metro Manila, Philippines
- Genres: Jazz, standards
- Occupations: Singer; songwriter
- Instruments: Vocals, guitar
- Years active: 2002–present
- Labels: MCA Music (2007–2013); Universal Records (2013–present); Star Magic (2007–present); Cornersont Entertainment (present)
- Website: www.richardpoon.ph

Richard Poon (born December 8, 1973) is a Filipino-Chinese singer, songwriter and TV personality in the Philippines.

He is a former member of the group U-Turn.

== Early life ==
Poon was born on December 8, 1973, in Makati, Philippines. His parents, Robert Poon (from Hong Kong) and Eva Huang (from Taiwan), are of Chinese descent. He has a sister named Eva Marie.

== Career ==
As a musician, Poon has performed in various lounges and bars across Metro Manila with his four-piece band, as well as in weddings. He used to regularly perform at Eastwood Central Plaza.

As a recording artist, he is known for covering standards and classic pop songs, including Filipino songs. He has also written songs, including "Lalala" which was performed by Regine Velasquez and Piolo Pascual for the soundtrack of their film Paano Kita Iibigin?.

Poon cites Harry Connick, Michael Bublé and Jose Mari Chan as having influenced his singing style.

=== Television ===
Poon was one of the regular performers in the Sunday variety show ASAP (ABS-CBN channel 2). He was formerly part of the ASAP Sessionistas segment together with Sitti, Aiza Seguerra, Juris Fernandez, Duncan Ramos, Princess Velasco and Kean Cipriano.

== Personal life ==
Poon married Maricar Reyes on June 9, 2013, at the Bellevue Hotel in Alabang, Muntinlupa.

=== Political views ===
Poon is an outspoken supporter of 16th Philippine president Rodrigo Duterte. During the 2016 elections, he stated his disdain for the Liberal Party's "Yellow control" in government. On social media, he has expressed support for United States president Donald Trump and skepticism of mainstream media.

== Awards and nominations ==
Year	Award-giving body	Category	Nominated work	Results
2008	Aliw Awards	Best Male Performer in Hotels, Bars and Music Lounges	—N/a	Won
2008	Awit Awards	Best Performance by a New Male Recording Artist	"I'll Take Care of You"	Won
2008	Awit Awards	Best Performance by a Male Recording Artist (Performance Award)	"I'll Take Care of You"	Nominated
2008	Awit Awards	Best Performance by a Male Recording Artist (People's Choice Award)	"I'll Take Care of You"	Nominated
2009	Dangal ng Bayan Awards	Best Male Entertainer and Recording Artist	—N/a	Won
2009	1st Radio Music Awards	Breakthrough Artist of the Year	—N/a	Won
2010	Aliw Awards	Best Male Concert Performer	—N/a	Won

== Discography ==
=== With U-Turn ===
Albums
Year	Album details
2004	U-Turn: Released: 2004; Label: VIVA
2005	By Request: Released: 2005; Label: VIVA

Singles
Year	Title	Album
2004	"Hurting Inside"	U-Turn
2004	"A Million Miles Away"	U-Turn
2005	"Baby Come to Me"	By Request
2005	"Drive"	By Request
2005	"For You"	By Request
2005	"I Finally Found Someone"	By Request
2005	"I'd Still Say Yes"	By Request
2005	"Make It Real"	By Request
2005	"Spend My Life with You"	By Request
2005	"To Love Again"	By Request

=== Solo albums ===
Year	Album details	Certification
2007	I'll Take Care of You: Released: December 2007; Re-release: September 19, 2008 (Platinum Edition); Label: MCA	PARI: Platinum
2009	For You: Released: March 29, 2009; Label: MCA	PARI: Gold
2010	I'll Be Seeing You: Released: October 2010; Label: MCA	Gold
2012	The Crooner's Songbook: The Best of Richard Poon: Label: MCA	
2013	Legends: Label: Universal	
2014	The Crooner Sings Bacharach: Label: Universal	

=== Christmas albums ===
- Christmas With Richard Poon (2011)

=== Solo singles ===
Year	Title	Album	
2007	"I'll Take Care of You"	I'll Take Care of You	
2008	"The Last Time"	I'll Take Care of You	
2008	"Moon River"	I'll Take Care of You	
2008	"Kahit Maputi na ang Buhok Ko"	I'll Take Care of You	
2009	"Kumot at Unan	For You	
2009	"You and I"	For You	
2009	"Kahit 'Di Mo Napapansin"	For You	
2010	"Panalangin"	I'll Be Seeing You	
2013	"Truly"	Legends	
2023	"Christmas Won't Be the Same Without You"	"Tuloy Na Tuloy ang Pasko	Crooner Carols
