= Mad Mad Fun =

Mad Mad Fun was a youth lifestyle/music show produced by Animax Asia for Philippines. This weekly half-hour show is hosted by Lupin star Rhian Ramos and features interviews and wacky stunts with top Pinoy bands. Bands on the show have include Sandwich, Up Dharma Down, Sugarfree, Imago, Chicosci, Kamikaze and Pedicab. It also showcases the Philippines' first ever search of Kawaii girls. Alodia Almira Gosiengfiao emerged as the top Kawaii girl in the last episode of Mad Mad Fun which was aired on October 27, 2007. The other segments included a tech-review show and hip and happening local events coverages.

The show premiered on August 4, 2007, on Animax Philippines.
