= Franco (band) =

Filipino rock band

FRANCO
- Also known as: Franco Suspitsados
- Origin: Cebu, Philippines
- Genres: Alternative metal; post-grunge; hard rock; nu metal; reggae rock
- Years active: 2008–present
- Labels: Independent; MCA Music Philippines
- Members: Franco Reyes; Paul Cañada; Dave Delfin; Victor Guison
- Past members: Gabby Alipe; Ocho Toleran; Buwi Meneses; JanJan Mendoza

Franco (stylized in all caps) is a Filipino rock band from the Philippines with front man Franco Reyes, Paul Cañada on guitar, Dave Delfin on bass and Victor Guison on drums.

== History ==
Formed in 2008, FRANCO had its beginnings as a supergroup with members from iconic Filipino bands, consisting of Franco Reyes (InYo and Frank!) on vocals, Gabby Alipe (Urbandub) on guitar, 8 Toleran (Queso) on guitar, Buwi Meneses (Parokya ni Edgar) on bass guitar, and JanJan Mendoza (Urbandub) on drums. The band started as a collaboration project between Alipe, Toleran, Meneses and Mendoza, who are prominent musicians in the Pinoy rock scene. In late 2008, deciding to have a front man for their project band, Alipe, Mendoza, Toleran and Meneses collaborated with Reyes, who had returned to the Philippines from a stay in the U.S., thus completing the band, Franco. In 2009, they recorded songs that comprised Franco's first album. Upon the release of the first album in 2010, their songs quickly became hits and topped the charts. The band dominated the 2010 NU Rock Awards with 4 awards and 9 nominations. They were also nominated and won an award in the 2010 Awit Awards. However, in 2012, Alipe, Meneses, Toleran and Mendoza left the group, with Reyes persisting to continue. Recruiting new bandmates, FRANCO, now a principal act, released their sophomore studio album in 2013, entitled Soul Adventurer. In 2018, they released another full-length album Flight with 10 original tracks, including Aurora Sunrise and Lost in Your Universe.

== Music ==
FRANCO's musical roots are traced to a Cebu-based band named Frank!, formed by Reyes in 1996, which is credited for having boosted the Cebu rock scene. However, despite reggae-leaning songs originally composed by Reyes for Frank!, the latter music of Franco became considerably heavier. Two Franco songs — “Touch the Sky” and “Song for the Suspect — have Rastafarian messages.

== Mainstream success ==
In 2010, they released their self-titled full-length album under MCA Music. Music videos for “Castaway” and “This Gathering” were aired on the Filipino music channel, Myx. FRANCO also dominated the 2010 NU Rock Awards by winning four awards—Artist of the Year, Song of the Year for “This Gathering”, Album of the Year for their self-titled album, and the Listeners' Choice Award. The supergroup also won an award during the 2010 Awit Awards as the Best Performance By A Group Of Recording Artists - "Castaway", and was also nominated for the Best Performance By A New Group Of Recording Artists - "Castaway" and Best Rock/Alternative - "Castaway". The band was nominated numerous times for the MYX Music Awards.

In 2013, Soul Adventurer was released as the band's second album. With the new lineup on board, the group won Best Alternative Recording (Awit Awards) for the song Better Days.

On November 9, 2014, FRANCO launched an EP titled Frank! at the St. James Power Station in Sentosa, Singapore.

== Band members ==
Current members

- Franco Reyes – lead vocals, guitar (2008–present)
- Paul "Poldo" Cañada – guitar (2012–present)
- Dave Delfin – bass (2012–present)
- Victor Guison – drums (2012–present)

Former members

- Gabby Alipe – guitar, vocals (2008–2012)
- Paolo "8"/"Ocho" Toleran – guitar (2008–2012)
- JanJan Mendoza – drums (2008–2012)
- Buwi Meneses – bass (2008–2012)

== Discography ==
=== Studio Album ===
- Franco (2010)
- Soul Adventurer (2013)
- Flight (2018)

=== EP ===
- Frank! (2014)

=== Track listing ===
Franco (2010)

No.	Title	Length
1.	"Seasons"	3:56
2.	"Touch The Sky"	3:43
3.	"Castaway"	4:30
4.	"Memorykill"	4:44
5.	"A Mass For The End of Time"	4:20
6.	"Last Waltz"	5:49
7.	"Next Train Out"	3:01
8.	"Song For The Suspect"	5:06
9.	"Tetrahydrochloridedub"	2:15
10.	"This Gathering"	4:21
11.	"For My Dearly Departed"	5:22
Total length:		48:12

Soul Adventurer (2013)

No.	Title	Length
1.	"032"	0:32
2.	"To Survive"	4:38
3.	"Moonset"	5:03
4.	"Better Days"	5:01
5.	"What Is To Be Must Be"	0:21
6.	"Renewal"	5:34
7.	"Drifter"	1:19
8.	"A Beautiful Diversion"	3:57
9.	"Across The Milkyway"	5:15
10.	"Razor"	5:41
11.	"Blame"	5:24
12.	"Follow That Light"	1:18
13.	"Uprising"	5:39
14.	"Babylonian Politicians"	0:31
15.	"Muse"	5:26
16.	"Lover's Fire"	4:27
17.	"A Prayer"	4:16
Total length:		64:36

Flight (2018)

No.	Title	Length
1.	"Afterburn"	4:10
2.	"Last Word"	4:58
3.	"All Nighter"	4:51
4.	"Mondaze"	4:43
5.	"Lost In Your Universe"	4:22
6.	"Best I Ever"	5:06
7.	"Aurora Sunrise"	4:52
8.	"Rebirth"	4:20
9.	"Breaking For The Weekend"	4:49
10.	"Goodbye, Goodnight"	5:10
Total length:		67:21

== Awards and nominations ==
Year	Award giving body	Category	Nominated work	Results
2010	Awit Awards	Best Performance By A Group Of Recording Artists	"Castaway"	Won
2010	Awit Awards	Best Performance By A New Group Of Recording Artists	"Castaway"	Nominated
2010	Awit Awards	Best Rock/Alternative	"Castaway"	Nominated
2010	NU Rock Awards	Artist of the Year	—N/a	Won
2010	NU Rock Awards	Album of the Year	"Franco"	Won
2010	NU Rock Awards	Song of the Year	"This Gathering"	Won
2010	NU Rock Awards	Listeners' Choice Award	—N/a	Won
2010	NU Rock Awards	Vocalist of the Year	(for Franco Reyes)	Nominated
2010	NU Rock Awards	Guitarist of the Year	(for Gabby Alipe, Paolo Toleran, Franco Reyes)	Nominated
2010	NU Rock Awards	Bassist of the Year	(for Buhawi Meneses)	Nominated
2010	NU Rock Awards	Drummer of the Year	(for JanJan Mendoza)	Nominated
2010	NU Rock Awards	Best New Artist	—N/a	Nominated
2011	MYX Music Awards	Favorite New Artist	—N/a	Nominated
2013	Awit Awards	Best Alternative Recording	"Better Days"	Won
2014	MYX Music Awards	Favorite Rock Video	"Better Days"	Nominated
