= I'll Be Seeing You (Richard Poon album) =

Studio album by Richard Poon
- Released: October 2010
- Recorded: 2010
- Genres: Pop, jazz
- Languages: English, Tagalog
- Label: MCA
- Producer: Ricky R. Ilacad

Richard Poon chronology
For You (2009)	I'll Be Seeing You (2010)

Singles from I'll Be Seeing You
- 1. "Panalangin" Released: October 2010

I'll Be Seeing You is the third studio album by Filipino pop-jazz singer Richard Poon, released in the Philippines in October 2010 by MCA Records. The album consists mostly of cover versions of classic hits such as "The Way You Look Tonight", "Fever" and "L-O-V-E". It features the singer's Sessionistas co-performers, Nina and Sitti. It also features a limited edition 2011 photo calendar of Poon.

== Background ==
Poon is known for making pop music out of what is basically in the jazz genre category. He expresses not being bothered by people and listeners, who criticize how he does his music, saying “It’s their opinion. I respect that. Ako [Me], I just do what I love to do”.

== Concept and packaging ==
To increase the chance of getting the album noticed, the label used a novel packaging for the album, incorporating a pull-out calendar in the design. Poon explains, “Eto ‘yung perfect example ‘nung sinasabi ko na minsan [This is a perfect example of what I sometimes say] you have to fight for control. My label suggested the calendar design. Hindi ko gusto [I didn't like it]. I argued about it. Kasi parang andami kong pictures, hindi ako comfortable [Because it's like I have so many pictures, I'm not comfortable]. Pero [But], I’m thankful that they won in the end, kasi maganda naman kinalabasan [because the outcome looks good] and people are noticing it.” Aside from the limited edition 2011 photo calendar, the album comes with a special discount from Hush Puppies.

== Production ==
I'll Be Seeing You consists of classics pop hits that were re-invented by Poon. He stated that his genre is one of the hardest to deal with, especially with complicated big band arrangements that "will make you bleed at least financially". He adds "I’m happy to hit such a wide market". He contended that tunes written today are simpler, still catchy, but has short-term appeal, whereas songs then had complex melodic lines bound to stand the test of time. Among the reinvented tracks are his take on APO Hiking Society’s “Panalangin”, Peggy Lee's “Fever" with Asia's Soul Siren Nina, and the well-loved standard, "The Way You Look Tonight". He also wrote a new song for the album, entitled "Teddy Bear".

== Promotion ==
Poon launched I'll Be Seeing You on Sunday noontime variety show, ASAP XV, performing the lead single "Panalangin", which is an Apo Hiking Society original. He also promoted the album in mall shows, performing in SM Supermalls.

=== Singles ===
"Panalangin", a cover of Apo Hiking Society's hit, was released as the first single along with album. It was performed by Poon on the album's launch on ASAP XV in October 2010.

== Track listing ==
1. "Panalangin"
2. "All the Way"
3. "L-O-V-E"
4. "I'll Be Seeing You"
5. "Fever" (featuring Nina)
6. "The Way You Look Tonight"
7. "Call Me"
8. "That's All"
9. "My Eyes Adored You" (featuring Sitti)
10. "Teddy Bear"
11. "Beyond the Sea"
