= Edray Teodoro =

Filipino singer and semi-finalist on The Voice Kids Philippines

- Born: Philippines
- Occupation: Singer
- Known for: Semi-finalist on The Voice Kids Philippines
- Musical career
- Genres: Pop; R&B
- Instrument: Vocals
- Years active: 2014–present
- Label: MCA Music (Philippines) (now UMG Philippines)

Edray Teodoro is a Filipino singer best known as a semi-finalist on the first season of The Voice Kids Philippines in 2014. She has since built a recording career under MCA Music Philippines and received multiple nominations at the Awit Awards.

== Career ==
Teodoro first gained national attention as a contestant on The Voice Kids Philippines in 2014, where she became one of the semi-finalists.

In 2016, she was nominated for Best Performance by a New Female Recording Artist at the 29th Awit Awards for her recording of the single "Puedepende". She received the same nomination again at the 33rd Awit Awards in 2020 for the song "Sana Hindi Na Kayo", along with her third nominee for Best Pop Recording.

She released her self-titled debut album, Edray, through MCA Music Philippines. The album featured original tracks as well as her earlier singles.

In 2017, she recorded a cover of "How Far I'll Go" from Disney's Moana. During an event at Robinsons Galleria, Teodoro performed the duet "Caught In That Feeling" with fellow The Voice Kids participant Micka Gorospe in celebration of Jason Dy receiving a Gold Record Award.

In 2018, Teodoro collaborated with Indian-American pop artist Amrit Dasu on the single "Okay".

Teodoro has also appeared on the long-running ABS-CBN musical variety show ASAP, and opened for international artists Hailee Steinfeld and Nathan Sykes during their Manila tours.

== Discography ==
=== Studio albums ===
- Edray (2017)
- Covers (2025)

== Awards and nominations ==
=== Awit Awards ===
Year	Nominee / work	Award	Result
2016	Puedepende	Best Performance by a New Female Recording Artist	Nominated
2020	Sana Hindi Na Kayo	Best Performance by a New Female Recording Artist	Nominated
2020	Sana Hindi Na Kayo	Best Pop Recording	Nominated
