= Jensen Gomez =

Producer and musician

Jensen Gomez (born May 4, 1991) is a Filipino vocalist, musician and producer.

His debut album, Umpisa (trans: beginning) was released in 2014 by Universal Records. In 2019 he signed with Sony Music Philippines as a solo act, and released two double singles, HANGIN/INIT and Brand New Man/Chasing and a standalone single, “Gemini Soul”. He also released “Muses” (2019) under the name Memphiis with MCA Music Philippines.

In 2021, he joined an indie record label Off The Record as head of its A&R department and in-house artist. He released Phases Vol. 1, Phases Vol. 2 and Phases Vol. 3 under said record label in the same year.

Gomez is known for the sexual misconduct allegations against him and his band, Jensen and the Flips, by several women.

== Film and television ==
In 2012 Jensen Gomez contributed his song, Umpisa, to the soundtrack of Emerson Reyes’ full-length independent film, “MNL 143”. The soundtrack featured original music written and performed by Jensen Gomez, Peryodiko, Carlos Castano, Rya Petines and Ling Lava, Boogie Romero, Fando and Lis, Archievals and Dalisay Cortes, among others. In 2013, also acted as himself in "My Brother's Lover", an hour-long episode of the television drama, "Maynila" aired by GMA. In 2018, Gomez joined the production crew for the films “Glorious” and “Wild and Free”. In 2020, he did the score for the movie, “Malaya”, directed by Connie Macatuno.

== Jensen and The Flips ==
Jensen and The Flips, active in the years 2013–2018, was an indie pop band organized by Jensen Gomez consisting of himself on vocals and guitars, with Mel Roño on guitar, Choi Padilla on bass, Carlo Maraingan on percussion, Jesser Sison on keyboard, and Fitz Manto on drums, and were featured in various festivals and events. Past members included * Michael Joshua Gemina (drums, backing vocals) and Miggy Concepcion (keyboards). Their first album “Honeymoon LP” was released in 2015 by MCA Music Philippines. In 2017 they released their second album called “BTTR” independently. However, Jensen Gomez and some of the band members were implicated in alleged acts of sexual misconduct leveled on them by some women on social media, most evidently on Twitter and were forced to regroup.

== Discography ==
=== Albums ===
- Umpisa (2014, released by Universal Records)

=== Extended Play ===
- Phases Vol. 1 (2021, released by Off The Record and MCA Music)
- Phases Vol. 2 (2021, released by Off The Record and MCA Music)
- Phases Vol. 3 (2021, released by Off The Record and MCA Music)

=== Singles ===
- "Init" (2019)
- "Hangin" (2019)

=== As Jensen and The Flips ===
- Honeymoon (2015)
- BTTR (2017)

=== As Memphiis ===
- Muses (2019, released by MCA Music)
