= Sabrina (Filipino singer) =

- Born: Roli Alexandra Xanxan Orial; 30 December 1989 (age 36); Laguna, Philippines
- Origin: Philippines
- Genres: Acoustic; pop; OPM
- Occupation: Singer
- Instruments: vocal; guitar
- Years active: 2006–present
- Label: MCA Music

Roli Alexandra Xanxan Orial Guinto (née Orial; born 30 December 1989), also known by her stage name Sabrina, is a Filipina recording artist and acoustic singer of cover versions.

== Music career ==
She has released a series of cover albums titled I Love Acoustic, with some being certified gold in the Philippines, and also in other countries including Indonesia and Thailand.

On 11 October 2015, she represented the Philippines at the 2015 Asia Song Festival held in Busan, South Korea.

She then released her first original album, Sab in 2016. Most of the tracks were composed by her including "Kung Pwede Lang", which was featured as the theme song for Koreanovela Oh My Venus which aired on GMA Network. Another song from the album titled "Permanent", was written by multi-awarded international songwriter Diane Warren, and was featured in Angel's Revenge.

== Discography ==
=== Studio albums ===
- Sabrina (2006)
- I Love Acoustic (2007)
- I Love Acoustic Too (2009)
- I Love Acoustic 3 (2010)
- I Love Acoustic 4 (2011)
- Acoustic Love Notes (featuring Joe D'Mango) (2012)
- I Love Acoustic 5 (2012)
- I Love Acoustic 6 (2013)
- I Love Acoustic 7 (2014)
- I Love Acoustic 8 (2015)
- Sab (2016)
- I Love Acoustic 9 (2016)
- I Love Acoustic 10.1 (2017)
- I Love Acoustic 10.2 (2017)

=== Live albums ===
- I Love Acoustic – Sweetheart (Deluxe) Edition – 2 discs (2013)
- Acoustic Playlist (2013)

=== Compilation albums ===
- Acoustic Greatest Hits (2013)

=== Singles ===
- "Dota o Ako" (Aikee featuring Sabrina) (2012) (originally featured Vanessa in 2011; acoustic version released also in 2012)
- "Di Na Ako Aasa Pa" (originally by Introvoys) (2020)
