= BP Valenzuela =

B.P. Valenzuela
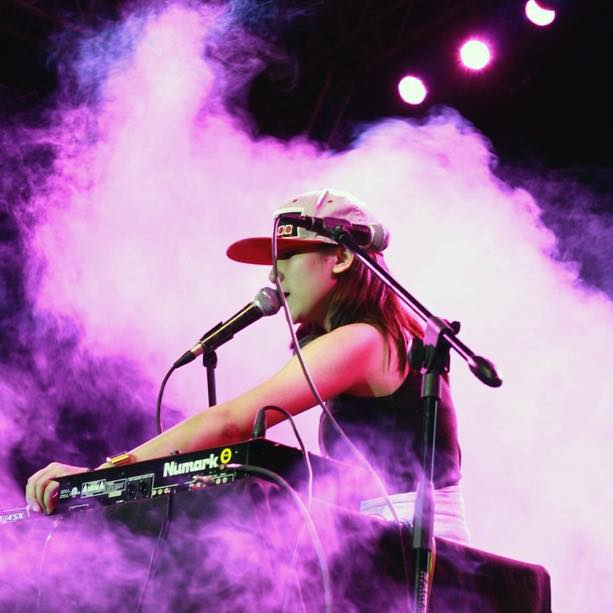
- BP Valenzuela performing for Satchmi Vinyl Day 2015

Background information
- Also known as: Half-lit (side project)
- Born: Manila, Philippines
- Genres: Indie pop; Indie electronic; Electropop; Synthpop
- Instruments: Guitar; Keyboard; Synthesizer; Vocals
- Years active: 2014–present
- Label: Party Bear Records
- Website: bpvalenzuela.bandcamp.com

B.P. Valenzuela is a Filipino singer-songwriter, producer and independent electronic pop artist from the Philippines. She is best known for her debut EP, be/ep (2014), and her debut studio album The Neon Hour (2015) with popular singles like "Pretty Car", and "Steady".

Aside from her main focus as an electropop musician, she also performs as half-lit.

== Life and career ==
Valenzuela started her music career at the age of 18 while a freshman at Ateneo de Manila University, taking up Sociology and Anthropology studies. In 2014, she released her debut EP entitled be/ep and later transferred to De La Salle–College of Saint Benilde to pursue music studies. She worked as a part-time barista at Satchmi, a retail vinyl record store. Later that year, she worked on her debut album, with Nicholas Lazaro (of Twin Lobster and MOONWLK) co-producing "Pretty Car", "Building Too" and "The Fury and Sound". Her debut album, entitled The Neon Hour, was released on March 30, 2015. Her debut single, "Steady", was released in the same year and was featured in the indie film Sleepless.

Valenzuela has performed on various music festivals such as Fête dela Musique Philippines, Wanderland Music and Arts Festival (2015), Goodvybes Festival (2016), Bandwagon Riverboat Festival (2016), and has opened for acts such as No Rome, The Sam Willows and Chairlift.

Valenzuela was set to release her sophomore album, Crydancer, in July 2017.

In mid-2018, she collaborated with rock band Sandwich for the Coke Studio Philippines project.

In 2019, Valenzuela released paradigm shift, a six-song EP under her "half-lit" side project.

== Discography ==
=== Albums ===
==== Studio albums ====
List of studio albums, with selected chart positions, sales figures and certifications
Title	Album details	Peak chart positions	Sales	Certifications
Title	Album details	PHL	Sales	Certifications
The Neon Hour	Released: March 28, 2015; Label: Party Bear Records; Format: Streaming, download	— (Note: The Philippine Hot 100 did not exist yet during this time.)		
Crydancer	Released: 2019 (TBA); Label: Party Bear Records; Format: LP	—		
"—" denotes a recording that did not chart or was not released in that territory.

==== Compilation albums ====
List of compilation albums, with selected chart positions, sales figures and certifications
Title	Album details	Peak chart positions	Sales	Certifications
Title	Album details	PHL	Sales	Certifications
Fresh Filter: Volume 1	Released: May 22, 2015; Format: LP	—		
Logiclub X1	Released: April 15, 2016; Label: Futurestudio; Format: Streaming, download	—		
"—" denotes a recording that did not chart or was not released in that territory.

=== Extended plays ===
As herself

List of extended plays, with selected chart positions, sales figures and certifications
Title	Album details	Peak chart positions	Sales	Certifications
Title	Album details	PHL	Sales	Certifications
be/ep	Released: March 12, 2014; Format: Streaming, download	—		
"—" denotes a recording that did not chart or was not released in that territory.

As half-lit

List of extended plays, with selected chart positions, sales figures and certifications
Title	Album details	Peak chart positions	Sales	Certifications
Title	Album details	PHL	Sales	Certifications
paradigm shift	Released: October 30, 2019; Format: Streaming, download	—		
"—" denotes a recording that did not chart or was not released in that territory.

=== Singles ===
As herself

List of singles, with selected chart positions and certifications, showing year released and album name
Title	Year	Peak chart positions	Certifications	Album
Title	Year	PHL	Certifications	Album
"Geomorph"	2014	—		be/ep (EP)
"Building"	2014	—		be/ep (EP)
"All That You Are"	2014	—		be/ep (EP)
"The General Scheme of Things"	2014	—		be/ep (EP)
"Second Nature"	2014	—		be/ep (EP)
"early/late"	2015	—		The Neon Hour
"Pretty Car"	2015	—		The Neon Hour Fresh Filter: Volume 1
"Logic"	2015	—		The Neon Hour
"Steady"	2015	—		The Neon Hour
"Like Letter"	2015	—		The Neon Hour
"Building Too"	2015	—		The Neon Hour
"Veneers" (feat. Curtismith)	2015	—		The Neon Hour
"Even If You Asked Me"	2015	—		The Neon Hour
"Great Expectations"	2015	—		The Neon Hour
"The Fury and Sound" (feat. Nick Lazaro)	2015	—		The Neon Hour
"All of the Noise"	2015 2016	—		The Neon Hour Logiclub X1
"bbgirl" (feat. August Wahh and No Rome)	2017	—		Crydancer
"Cards" (feat. crwn)	2017	—		Crydancer
"Instead (Hold You Down)"	2017	—		Crydancer
"Minimize" (feat. Nick Lazaro)	2017	—		Crydancer
"Stutter" (with Sandwich)	2017	—		Coke Studio
"—" denotes a recording that did not chart or was not released in that territory.

As half-lit

List of singles, with selected chart positions and certifications, showing year released and album name
Title	Year	Peak chart positions	Certifications	Album
Title	Year	PHL	Certifications	Album
"fri the 13th"	2019	—		paradigm shift (EP)
"cruising on the wavelength"	2019	—		paradigm shift (EP)
"—" denotes a recording that did not chart or was not released in that territory.
