= Autotelic =

Filipino indie-alternative rock band

- Origin: Manila, Philippines
- Genres: Indie; pop rock; alternative rock
- Years active: 2012–present
- Labels: Nemesis Music Group; MCA Music; Yellow Room Music; Sony Music Philippines
- Members: Josh Villena; Neil Tin; Timothy “Pabs” Vargas; Gep Macadaeg; EJ Edralin
- Past members: Eric Tubon; Kai Honasan
- Website: autotelicmusic.bandcamp.com

Autotelic is a Filipino indie-alternative rock band in Manila, Philippines. Formed in 2012, the band consists of Josh Villena (guitars and vocals), Neil Tin (guitars), EJ Edralin (synth), Timothy “Pabs” Vargas (bass guitar), and Gep Macadaeg (drums). The band is currently signed with independent record label Nemesis Music Group, and major record label MCA Music.

== History ==
Autotelic started when Neil Tin, the band’s guitarist, spoke to Josh Villena. Villena is the band’s composer, lead vocalist, and guitarist. The band, which then consisted of Villena, Tin, Pabs Villegas (bassist), and Gep Macadaeg (drummer), who first met at a fast-food court. That is where they started to make music on a synthesis of Japanese and alternative rock and dance music.

Eventually, Eric Tubon, the keyboardist joined the band. He is also with the progressive rock band Fuseboxx. Then later, singer-songwriter Kai Honasan replaced Tubon as their keyboard player, while EJ Edralin later joined the band playing synths. The first song on which they worked with Honasan is the album’s first single, “Dahilan".

== Coke Studio PH collaborations ==
Autotelic collaborated with Sugarfree's former lead vocalist Ebe Dancel for Coke Studio PH. The band played Sugarfree's "Bawat Daan" while Ebe Dancel played Autotelic's "Dahilan". They ended the episode with their collaborated song "Bahagi".

== Discography ==
=== Albums ===
- Papunta Pabalik (2016)

=== Extended plays ===
- Autotelic (2014)
- Takipsilim (2018)

=== Compilations ===
- Fresh Filter: Volume 1 (2015)

=== Singles ===
- "Misteryoso"
- "Dahilan"
- "Close Your Eyes" (2015)
- "Gising" (2016)
- "Laro" (2016)
- "Languyin" (2017)
- "Bahagi" (with Ebe Dancel) (Coke Studio Philippines, 2017)
- "Takipsilim" (2018)
- "Ikaw" (2020)
- "Bago" (2020)
- "Kwentuhan" (2021)
- "Iwan" (2021)
- "Paano" (2025)

== Accolades ==
Year	Award	Category	Notable Works	Result
2017	30th Awit Award	Record of the Year	Laro	Nominated
2017	30th Awit Award	Best Performance by a New Group Recording Artist	Laro	Won
2017	30th Awit Award	Best Rock/Alternative Recording	Gising	Nominated
2017	30th Awit Award	Best Performance by a Group Recording Artist	Gising	Nominated
