= Urbandub =

Filipino rock band

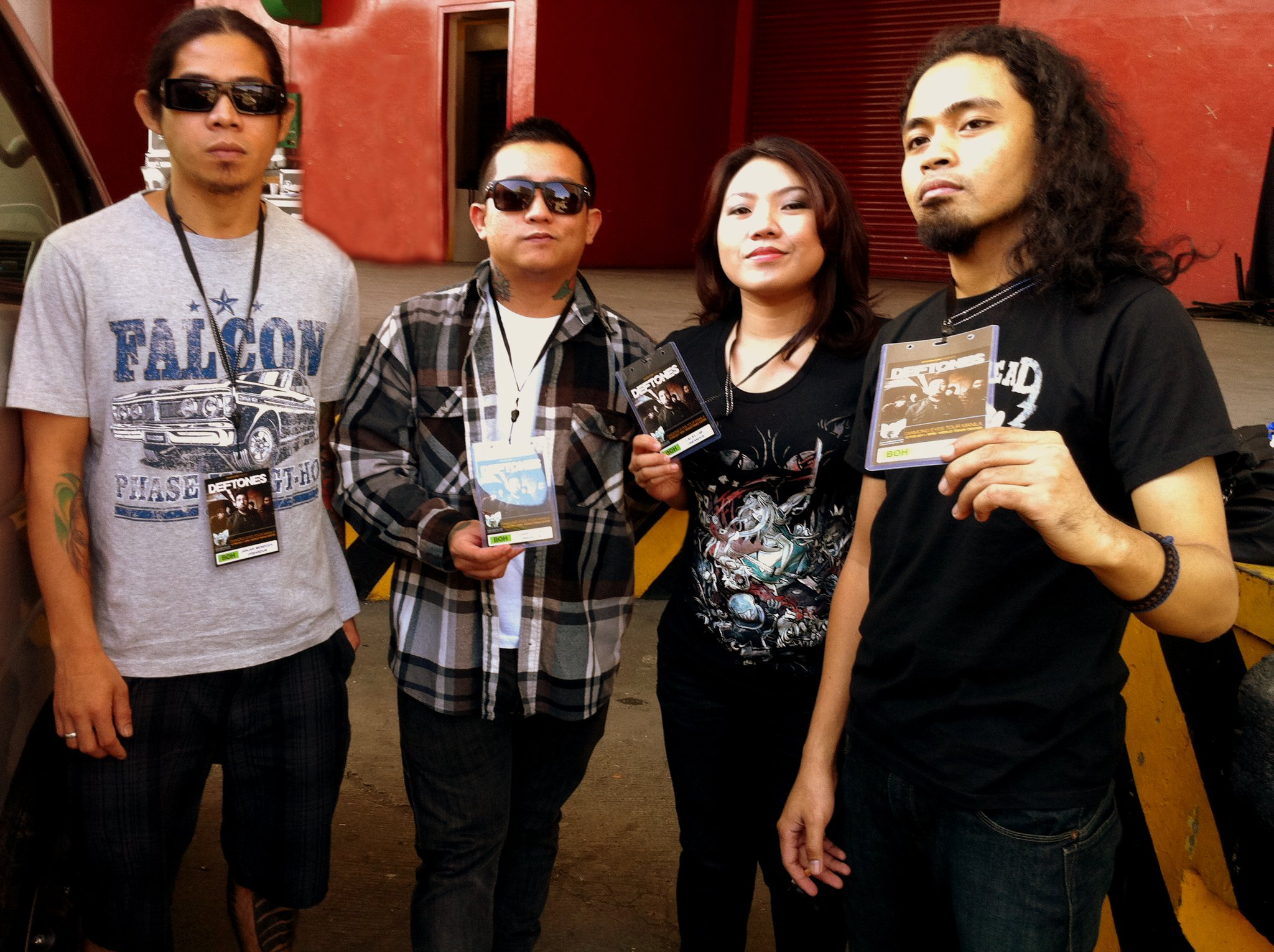
- Urbandub arriving at the venue for the Deftones Diamond Eyes Tour Manila on February 12, 2011 (from L to R: JanJan Mendoza, Gabby Alipe, Lalay Lim, and John Dinopol)

Background information
- Origin: Cebu, Philippines
- Genres: Alternative rock; hard rock; experimental rock; alternative metal; pop punk; nu metal
- Years active: 2000–2015; 2016–present
- Labels: Lighter; PolyEast; MCA Universal
- Members: Gabby Alipe; John Dinopol; Lalay Lim; Sam Saludsong; Russ Manaloto; JanJan Mendoza
- Past members: Jed Honrado; Jerros Dolino
- Website: www.myspace.com/urbandub

Urbandub is a Filipino rock band from Cebu City, Philippines formed in 2000. The band's current line-up consisted of Gabby Alipe, John Dinopol, Lalay Lim, Sam Saludsong and Russ Manaloto.

Urbandub is the first indie band in the Philippines to release albums nationwide with the assistance of a major label. The label also featured Urbandub in a Pinoy rock compilation entitled "FULL VOLUME", with a remake of Sade's "No Ordinary Love". The band recently garnered the attention of fans throughout Southeast Asia with a tour in Singapore.

The band posted on Facebook stating that they would be having their last concert with their original line-up on May 9, 2015. Bass guitarist and back-up vocalist Lalay Lim and drummer JanJan Mendoza left the band to prioritize their families afterwards.

In 2016, Alipe and Dinopol reunited to reform Urbandub (also dubbed as "Gab and John") along with bass player Russ Manaloto and drummer Sam Saludsong. In 2018, Lim and Mendoza returned after a hiatus from the band.

== Background ==
=== Birth (2001) ===
Urbandub's debut album suffered distribution problems due to the lack of support from major record companies. Later in the year, their first single "Come" was released and accompanied with a music video funded by Sonic Boom productions. The following singles from the album included "Boy", "Give", and "Would You Go". Although only a modest success at the time, the album managed to earn the band some degree of notoriety within Cebu City. Though the album's production quality was rough, it emerged as a successor to the scene that dominated independent radio in the mid 1990.

=== Influence (2003) ===
With the release of their second effort, INFLUENCE on Lighter Records (Backyard Studio), Urbandub took on a new form, changing their sound with a new drummer (From Jed Honrado to Jerros Dolino). Jerros continued to record tracks with band, but left sometime in 2003 when he decided to leave for undisclosed reasons. The band then recruited JanJan Mendoza. It was the sound in this album that clearly defined the steps that Urbandub would start to take. INFLUENCE includes radio-released singles such as "Gone" and, their most famous release to date, "Soul Searching", which won the award as Best Song of the Year in the NU107 Rock Awards 2003. The album also won as the Album of the Year Award in the NU107 Rock Awards 2004. They also released a single called "A New Tattoo", dedicated to a former friend Juan Paulo Hidalgo.

During this time, the band also experienced the dangers brought by rival frat/gang wars in Cebu as guitarist John Dinopol was mistakenly shot at by a motorcycle riding headhunter of an undisclosed fraternity. Although not in critical condition, his left arm was injured and had to recover for a few months. Amidst the dilemma, Urbandub enlisted Faspitch guitarist Russell Manaloto and Mong Alcaraz of Chicosci to fill in for John, who was still active with the band despite the injury. John recovered in less than a year and went on to shoot the "A New Tattoo" video and perform live with metal braces on his arm.

=== Embrace (2005) ===
With the 2005 release of the album Embrace, the band has kept Lighter Records as their management arm and guide. In line with their ideals, EMI allowed them the creative freedom to record their album on their home soil of Cebu. Embrace's singles, "Alert The Armory", "Frailty", "Endless, A Silent Whisper" and the pop song "First of Summer" culled from the third album Embrace, became one of the most played songs on local radio.

=== Under Southern Lights (2007) ===
Urbandub released the ten-track album Under Southern Lights on June 15, 2007. This album follows the sale of 10,000 previous albums and national travel. The release features a rock sound and varied songwriting.

Asked about the album title, "The name is our tribute to Cebu City where we came from and where we did most of the writing for the album. It's also a metaphor for our families in Cebu, being that they're our inspiration and guiding light," Alipe said.

=== The Apparition (2009) ===
In 2009, after ending their contract with EMI, urbandub signed with a new label MCA MUSIC and released their fifth and most experimental album entitled "The Apparition" on November 28, 2009

The writing took place again in Cebu, the band's homecourt, with the band renting a house up the mountains and turning it into a home studio for 2 months. after which, they returned to Manila and recorded again in Tracks Studio with their Under Southern Lights producer Angee Rozul. The first few prints of the album included a cover of Depeche Mode's song "Home" and a cover of Sade's "No Ordinary Love". The first single off the album was the song "Gravity", a song that carries the band's trademark heavy riffing balanced with melodies and harmonies that are rarely found in Pinoy rock music.

=== Esoteric (2013) ===
On September 20, 2013. the band released their sixth album (and most recent, before their last gig with the original line-up in 2015), spawned the single "Never Will I Forget" that according to frontman Gabby Alipe, dedicated to their fans (called Dubistas) that they invited some of their fans to record the gang shouts used in the song.

== Hiatus and reformation ==
The band held their 'farewell' concert entitled "Endless" on May 9, 2015, a rainy Saturday night held at Metrotent Convention Center in Metrowalk, Ortigas. Later on the same year, Gabby Alipe briefly performed as a solo artist.

In 2016, the band went active again but performing as a trio, then later as a quartet (Gabby on guitar and vocals, John on guitar, Russ Manaloto of Faspitch on bass, and Sam Saludsong on drums).

On February 25, 2018, the original lineup of the band came together to play their songs at 70s Bistro and on February 26, 2018 at 19 EAST Bar and Grill. It was attended by 750 strong Urbandub followers also known as Dubistas.

== Members ==
Current members

- Gabby Alipe - lead vocals, rhythm guitar (2000–2015; 2016–present)
- John Dinopol - lead guitar, backing vocals (2000–2015; 2016–present)
- Lalay Lim-Geronimo - bass guitar, backing vocals (2000–2015, 2018–present)
- JanJan Mendoza - drums (2003–2015, 2018; currently on hiatus)
- Russ Manaloto - rhythm guitar, backing vocals (2018–present); bass guitar (2016–2018)
- Sam Saludsong - drums (2016–present)

Touring, studio, live, session members

• Eo Marcos - drums

• Macoy Manuel - drums

Former members

- Jed Honrado - drums (2000–2002)
- Jerros Dolino - drums (2002–2003)

== Discography ==
=== Studio albums ===
- Birth (2001)
- Influence (2003)
- Embrace (2005)
- Under Southern Lights (2007)
- The Apparition (2009)
- Esoteric (2013)

Album	Tracks	Year	Records
Birth	Boy; Breakdown; Would You Go; Dissect; Eating Me; Picture; Give; Come; It's Over; Two Things; Apart (a collaboration with Dice & K9); Give (acoustic version)	2001	Lighter Records
Influence	Fallen on Deaf Ears; Under Crisis; Soul Searching; Runaway; Versus; Gone; Sailing; Quiet Poetic; A New Tattoo; Lover Among Ruins	2003	Lighter Records
Embrace	An Interlude Between Closeness; Alert The Armory; Frailty; First of Summer; When Heroes Die; Reveal The Remedy; The Arsonist; Endless, A Silent Whisper; Safety in Numbers; A City of Sleeping Hearts; The End of Something	2005	EMI Philippines
Under Southern Lights	An Invitation; Anthem; The Fight Is Over; Guillotine; Cebuana; Life Is Easy; Evidence; A Method To Chaos; Inside The Mind of A Killer (a collaboration with Kat Agarrado of Sinosikat?); She Keeps Me Warm	2007	EMI Philippines
The Apparition	Meneurs De Loup; The Apparition; Face in the Woods; Gravity; When Shadows Have Eyes; What This Night Brings; A Call To Arms; Arrows; Tongues Like Knives; Bright City Kids; Stars & The Sun; Over The Hill & Back; We Kept It Hidden; Good Morning Bones; Mountains Tell Stories	2009	MCA Music, Inc.
Esoteric	Stars Have Aligned; Hover; Never Will I Forget; Dim the Headlights; Cold Hearted; When Love Is Not an Answer; Sleight of Hand; Between the Earth and Sky (a collaboration with Aia DeLeon, formerly of Imago); Mantra; The Burning Taste	2013	MCA Music, Inc.

=== EP Album ===
- Sending A Message (2011)

Album	Tracks	Year	Records
Sending A Message	Sending A Message; This Used To Be My Playground; A Call To Arms (Stripped Down Version); Home	2011	MCA Music, Inc.

== Singles ==
Year	Single	MYX Hit and Billboard Chart Highest Position	Album
2001	Come	—	Birth
2001	Give	—	Birth
2001	Would You Go	—	Birth
2003	Gone	—	Influence
2003	Soul Searching	—	Influence
2003	A New Tattoo	—	Influence
2005	Alert The Armory	—	Embrace
2005	Frailty	—	Embrace
2006	Endless, A Silent Whisper	11	Embrace
2006	First of Summer	7	Embrace
2007	Guillotine	1	Under Southern Lights
2008	Evidence	1	Under Southern Lights
2008	The Fight is Over	1	Under Southern Lights
2009	Gravity	1	The Apparition
2010	A Call To Arms	—	The Apparition
2011	Sending a Message	—	The Apparition
2013	Never Will I Forget	—	Esoteric
2013	Hover	—	Esoteric

== Videography ==
- From Birth
  - "Come"
- From Influence
  - "A New Tattoo"
- From Embrace
  - "Alert the Armory"
  - "First of Summer"
  - "Endless, A Silent Whisper"
  - "Frailty"
- From Under Southern Lights
  - "Guillotine"
  - "Evidence"
  - "The Fight is Over"
- From The Apparition
  - "Gravity"
  - "A Call To Arms"
  - "Sending a Message"
- From Esoteric
  - "Never Will I Forget"

== Awards and nominations ==
Year	Award giving body	Category	Nominated work	Results
2003	NU Rock Awards	Best Song of the Year	"Soul Searching"	Won
2004	NU Rock Awards	Album of the Year	"Influence"	Won
2006	MYX Music Awards	Favorite Rock Video	"Alert the Armory"	Nominated
2006	NU Rock Awards	Vocalist of the Year	(for Gabby Alipe)	Won
2006	NU Rock Awards	Guitarist of the Year	(for John Dinopol)	Nominated
2006	NU Rock Awards	Bassist of the Year	(for Lalay Lim)	Nominated
2006	NU Rock Awards	Drummer of the Year	(for JanJan Mendoza)	Nominated
2006	NU Rock Awards	Song of the Year	"First of Summer"	Nominated
2006	NU Rock Awards	Artist/ Band of the Year	—N/a	Nominated
2006	NU Rock Awards	Best Male Award	(for Gabby Alipe)	Nominated
2006	NU Rock Awards	Album of the Year	"Embrace"	Nominated
2006	NU Rock Awards	Best Album Packaging	(with Kahlil de Pio for "Embrace")	Nominated
2006	NU Rock Awards	Producer of the Year	(with Kerryl Demetrio for "Embrace")	Nominated
2007	NU Rock Awards	Best Music Video	"Frailty"	Nominated
2008	Awit Awards	Best Performance by a Group Recording Artists (Performance Award)	"Evidence"	Nominated
2008	Awit Awards	Best Rock Recording	"Guillotine"	Nominated
2008	Awit Awards	Best Performance by a Group Recording Artists (People's Choice Award)	"Evidence"	Nominated
2008	MYX Music Awards	Favorite Rock Video	"Guillotine"	Nominated
2008	NU Rock Awards	Listener's Choice Award	—N/a	Won
2008	NU Rock Awards	Vocalist of the Year	(for Gabby Alipe)	Nominated
2008	NU Rock Awards	Guitarist of the Year	(for John Dinopol)	Nominated
2008	NU Rock Awards	Bassist of the Year	(for Lalay Lim)	Nominated
2008	NU Rock Awards	Drummer of the Year	(for JanJan Mendoza)	Nominated
2008	NU Rock Awards	Best Live Act	—N/a	Nominated
2008	NU Rock Awards	Artist of the Year	—N/a	Nominated
2008	NU Rock Awards	Album of the Year	"Under Southern Lights"	Nominated
2008	NU Rock Awards	Best Album Packaging	(Team Manila for "Under Southern Lights")	Nominated
2008	NU Rock Awards	Song of the Year	"Evidence"	Nominated
2008	NU Rock Awards	Best Music Video	"Guillotine"	Nominated
2008	NU Rock Awards	Producer of the Year	(with Angee Rozul for "Under Southern Lights")	Nominated
2010	NU Rock Awards	Vocalist of the Year	(for Gabby Alipe)	Won
2010	NU Rock Awards	Bassist of the Year	(for Lalay Lim)	Won
2010	NU Rock Awards	Artist of the Year	—N/a	Nominated
2010	NU Rock Awards	Album of the Year	"The Apparition"	Nominated
2010	NU Rock Awards	Song of the Year	"A Call to Arms"	Nominated
2010	NU Rock Awards	Guitarist of the Year	(for Gabby Alipe and John Dinopol)	Nominated

OTHER AWARDS:

- Gold Record Award for Outstanding sales (2007) - "EMBRACE" album (EMI)
- "Best Group" - Junk Magazine Regional Music Awards (Malaysia) - (2008)

== Additional information ==
- According to the lead vocalist Gabby Alipe, behind the band's name:
  When we were just starting out..urbandub was supposed to be a reggae band...we were suppose [sic] to play reggae mixed with dub, ska, dancehall, hiphop, and rock. A perfect example of what urbandub would have been--is the song "sailing" and "eating me" --that was the style we were suppose [sic] to be playing around with--since we were suppose [sic] to be a reggae/dub band, hence the name, urbandub. But because of the series of line up [sic] changes--and new influences--we became what we are today! The name just kinda got stuck and we never bothered to change it. So there you go..the story behind the name "urbandub".
- Urbandub's music video "First of Summer" is about a girl rebelliously going out with her boyfriend. The band later released "Endless, A Silent Whisper", which shows the events that happened before and after what was shown in "First of Summer". Both videos were directed by Marie Jamora and were shot in three days.
- Urbandub was interviewed in Animax and later on performed in a show aired on Animax called Mad Mad Fun.
- The mark on Gabby Alipe's right eye isn't a scar nor a tattoo. In an interview, he stated that it is a birthmark shaped like Cebu island.
- In their second live performance on MYX, Gabby Alipe stated that the Urbandub way of making their album is to put exactly ten songs.
- For a short term of their name, they are labeled as "Udub", short for Urbandub.
- The band's lead vocalist and rhythm guitarist Gabby Alipe makes his acting debut in the 2015 film entitled The Breakup Playlist, on which he starred alongside fellow singers Piolo Pascual And Sarah Geronimo
- The genres Urbandub attributed to are Alternative metal, OPM, and Alternative rock. Musically, the band is heavily influenced by Deftones, Metallica, Nirvana, Smashing Pumpkins and Filter.
