= UMG Philippines =

Philippine record label branch of Universal Music Group

UMG Philippines Inc.
- Trade name: Universal Music Philippines (outside Philippine territory)
- Formerly: PolyCosmic Records (1993–1997); PolyGram Records (1997–1999); MCA Universal (1999–2004); MCA Music Inc. (2004–2021)
- Type: Subsidiary
- Industry: Music
- Founded: 1993; 33 years ago
- Headquarters: 12/F The Podium West Tower, 12 ADB Avenue, Ortigas Center, Mandaluyong, Metro Manila, Philippines
- Area served: Philippines
- Key people: Enzo Valdez (Managing Director)
- Parent: Universal Music Group
- Divisions: Def Jam Recordings Philippines; Island Records Philippines; Republic Records Philippines; EMI Records Philippines
- Website: shop.umusic.ph

UMG Philippines Inc. is a record label based in the Philippines and served as its regional branch of the multinational music corporation, Universal Music Group. Formerly known as MCA Music, the record label previously retained the now-discontinued MCA name on legal purposes because of a trademark dispute with an unrelated label known as Universal Records, which preempted the rights to the word "Universal" for recorded music in the Philippines. However, the company adopted the moniker "MCA/Universal", much like Universal Pictures' home video unit from 1990 to 1997, to simplify identification, even though no formal "Universal" branding is exercised. Despite the naming, the label is known outside the Philippines as Universal Music Philippines.

The record label then changed to its current name on November 3, 2021.

== History ==
PolyCosmic Records was formed in 1993 as a joint venture between PolyGram Music Group (Universal Music Group's predecessor, which has 30% of the company's stocks) and a consortium of Philippine businessmen including Dr. James G. Dy (founding chairman of Dyna Products, Inc., which was the local distributor of PolyGram) and Cosmic Records, a company founded in 1992 by Ramon Chuaying.

Universal Records — which would later be involved in a domestic trademark dispute with UMG — had the distribution rights to Polygram; and Chuaying was its first CEO.

In 1998, PolyGram N.V. was purchased by Seagram's and was merged into MCA Inc., and PolyGram Music Group was merged with MCA Music Entertainment to become Universal Music Group. After the merger, PolyCosmic Records was reincorporated as MCA Music Inc. (Philippines). In 2006, Ricky Ilacad was named the managing director and CEO.

MCA Music has a partnership with Smart Communications, Inc. to make music downloads available to phone users via music service Spinnr.

In 2020, UMG formally appointed Sindikato Management founder and former Sony Music Philippines A&R consultant Enzo Valdez as managing director, replacing Ilacad. The same year, UMG launched Def Jam Philippines and Island Records Philippines. In 2021, UMG signed a distribution agreement with Off the Record, a local independent label owned by Ilacad.

On November 3, 2021, after 23 years as MCA Music Inc., the record label was renamed as UMG Philippines Inc. On the same day, UMG Philippines formally launched its digital consumer-facing brand known as UMUSIC Philippines (umusic.ph).

On July 8, 2022, UMG launched its third label, Republic Records Philippines.

On February 5, 2024, UMG relaunched EMI Records Philippines as its fourth label after 22 years.

== Artists (past and present) ==
=== UMG Philippines (formerly MCA Music) ===
- 1:43
- Akafellas
- Johnny Alegre
- Gabby Alipe
- AM/FM
- Nicole Laurel Asensio
- Autotelic
- Bassilyo
- Chicosci
- Billy Crawford (2007–2008)
- The Dawn
- Jason Dy
- Jerry Dexter
- JC Regino
- Kyle Echarri
- Miguel Escueta (2007–2011)
- Fazura
- Pops Fernandez
- Shane Filan
- Barbie Forteza
- Franco
- Jensen and The Flips
- Lyca Gairanod
- Tricia Garcia
- Solenn Heussaff (2011–2014)
- DJ JOSH
- Kjwan
- Krissy and Ericka
- Juan Karlos Labajo
- The Lamars
- Joar Sabate (2019–2022)
- Elliot James Reay
- Kris Lawrence
- Tanya Markova
- MilesExperience
- Jim Paredes
- Pedicab
- Richard Poon
- Pupil
- Veronica and I
- Sabrina
- Jessica Sanchez
- Side A
- Sitti (2013–2017)
- Jona Soquite
- SouthFM
- Square One
- Edray Teodoro
- Vanjoss Bayaban
- Urbandub
- Nyoy Volante
- Mitoy Yonting
- Jim Cummings

=== Def Jam Philippines ===
- VVS Collective
- Fateeha
- DonWilson
- Tommie King
- Tiffany Lhei
- JMara
- Gabrang
- King Promdi
- 8 Ballin'
- Jano
- Karencitta
- Kien47

=== Island Records Philippines ===
- 10 a.m. Departure
- Alex Diaz
- Ang Bagong Luto ni Enriquez
- Blaster Silonga
- Cheats
- Chen Pangan
- Ciudad
- Denova
- Dia Mate
- Elijah Canlas
- Elise Huang
- Fern.
- Firegod
- Hannah + Gabi
- Hey June!
- Janine Berdin
- Jeiven
- Juan Karlos
- Kindred
- One Click Straight
- Over October
- Sepia Times
- Smow
- The Sundown
- THEA
- Us-2 Evil-0
- Zild Benitez

=== Republic Records Philippines ===
- AJAA
- Catriona Gray
- Cydel
- Darren Espanto
- Dom Guyot
- G22
- Huhsmile
- Iñigo Pascual
- Isang
- J-Nine
- Jayda Avanzado
- Justin Vasquez
- Manila Luzon
- Moira Dela Torre
- R Rules
- Richard Poon
- Unit 406
- Vxon
- Xonara
- Yeng Constantino
- Yes My Love
- Ysabelle Cuevas
- Zack Tabudlo
- Zephanie

=== EMI Records Philippines ===
- Shane Bernabe
- CHNDTR
- Dionela
- Cydel Gabutero
- Gracenote
- Jenzen Guino
- Hale
- Miss Ramonne
- Elha Nympha
- Daniel Paringit
- Patrick Quiroz
- Gabriel Tagadtad
- Dave Trinidad
- Waltz

== See also ==
- Universal Music Group
- Universal Records (Philippines)
- Dyna Music
- PolyEast Records
- Sony Music Philippines
- Warner Music Philippines
- List of Universal Music Group labels
