= Puede Nang Mangarap (song) =

2015 song by Lyca Gairanod

Single by Lyca Gairanod

from the album Puede Nang Mangarap
- Language: Filipino
- Released: June 19, 2015
- Genre: OPM, pop
- Length: 4:02
- Label: MCA Music Inc.
- Songwriter: Jungee Marcelo
- Producer: Jungee Marcelo

Lyca Gairanod singles chronology
"Puede Nang Mangarap" (2015)	"Sa Isang Awit" (2015)

Music video
- "Puede Nang Mangarap" on YouTube

Puede Nang Mangarap (lit. 'Now Able to Dream') is a song recorded by Filipino singer Lyca Gairanod. Written and produced by Jungee Marcelo, it was released in 2015 as the lead single and title track of her debut studio album under MCA Music Inc. following her victory in the first season of The Voice Kids Philippines.

== Background and composition ==
Following her win on the first season of The Voice Kids Philippines in July 2014, Gairanod signed a recording contract with MCA Music Inc. with Jungee Marcelo wrote and produced "Puede Nang Mangarap" for Gairanod.

The song is an inspirational OPM pop ballad written in Tagalog. Lyrically, the song reflects Gairanod's life journey from her background in Cavite to her success in the music industry.

Gairanod recorded the song when she was 11 years old and she said that when she recorded it back then, she really didn't know the meaning of the song, she just liking and having fun recording it because it was a dance song.

== Release and reception ==
"Puede Nang Mangarap" served as the title track for Gairanod's debut studio album, which was officially released in May 2015. The song received positive responses from listeners and critics for its inspirational message and the connection of the song with Gairanod's real-life story.

== Track listing ==
Digital download / streaming

- "Puede Nang Mangarap" – 4:02
- "Puede Nang Mangarap (Remix)" - 5:29

== Personnel ==
- Lyca Gairanod – lead vocals
- Jungee Marcelo – songwriting, production

== Virality ==
Over a decade after its original release, "Puede Nang Mangarap" became popular across social media platforms in the Philippines. Driven by dance trends on TikTok and memes on Facebook, netizens recreate the dance steps Gairanod performed in the original 2015 music video.

The trend attracted widespread attention, with Filipino public figures and groups—including BINI and Vice Ganda participating in the challenge. Gairanod also joined the trend herself on TikTok, posting side-by-side videos recreating the original choreography and teasing a potential reimagined version of the track.
