= Demonyo =

2017 song by Juan Karlos

Song by Juan Karlos

from the album JKL
- Released: January 27, 2017
- Genre: Alternative rock, blues rock
- Length: 3:38
- Label: MCA Music
- Producer: Francis Guevarra

"Demonyo" (transl. "Demon") is a song by Filipino singer-songwriter Juan Karlos Labajo. It was released on January 27, 2017, through MCA Music as a single from his sophomore studio album JKL.

The song experienced a commercial resurgence several years after its initial release, considering it a sleeper hit, driven by increased social media engagement.

== Background and release ==
"Demonyo" was written and composed by Juan Karlos Labajo and served as the second single from his sophomore studio album, JKL (2017). The track was a significant departure from the singer's earlier pop-teen idol image established during his time on The Voice Kids, moving toward a more mature sound.

In 2018, a new version of the song titled "Demonyo (Redefined)" was released under the artist name "juan karlos", coinciding with the formation of his namesake band.

== Composition and lyrics ==
Musically, "Demonyo" is an alternative rock and blues rock track. The lyrics utilize religious imagery and metaphors, such as comparing the subject to an "angel in hell" and the narrator to a "demon". Despite its dark title, the song has been described as a romantic track about being opposites and the intensity of devotion. Labajo has stated that his songwriting process for the album was deeply personal, focusing on authenticity over commercial constraints.

== Accolades ==
At the 31st Awit Awards in 2018, "Demonyo" received two nominations, highlighting its critical success in both the pop and rock fields.

| Year | Award | Category | Result |
|---|---|---|---|
| 2018 | Awit Awards | Best Pop Recording | Nominated |
| 2018 | Awit Awards | Best Rock/Alternative Recording | Nominated |

== Production credits ==
Credits adapted from Apple Music and YouTube Music.

- Juan Karlos Labajo – vocals, songwriter, composer
- Francis Guevarra – producer
- Neil Gregorio – producer (Redefined version)
- Josemaria Lorenzo Arguelles – recording arranger
