= Puede Nang Mangarap =

2015 Studio album by Lyca Gairanod

Studio album by Lyca Gairanod
- Released: 25 May 2015
- Recorded: 2015
- Genre: Pop
- Length: 47:09
- Label: MCA Music Inc.

Lyca Gairanod chronology
The Voice Kids the Album (2014)	Puede Nang Mangarap (2015)

Alternative cover
- Puede Nang Mangarap Deluxe Edition cover

Singles from Puede Nang Mangarap
- 1. "Puede Nang Mangarap" Released: 27 April 2015; 2. "Sa Isang Awit" Released: 6 November 2015

Singles from Puede Nang Mangarap (Deluxe edition)
- 1. "Tayo Ay Maglaro" Released: October 3, 2016

Puede Nang Mangarap (It's Okay to Dream Now) is the first studio album by Filipina child singer Lyca Gairanod, who won the first season of The Voice Kids of the Philippines. The album, executive produced by MCA Music Inc. The album was supported by its official single, "Puede Nang Mangarap". Upon its release, Puede Nang Mangarap received generally positive reviews from music critics. The album debuted at number one in Philippines in its first week.

On September 17, 2026, the track "Puede Nang Mangarap" achieved widespread viral popularity primarily driven by dance trends on the social media platform TikTok and memes in Facebook.

== Background ==
The album was released 25 May 2015 by MCA Music, Inc.

== Single ==
The album's lead single "Puede Nang Mangarap" was released on 27 April 2015. On 19 June 2015 the music video was released for the single, and the lyric video was released on 14 August 2015. The album's second single "Sa Isang Awit" was released on 6 November 2015. The lyric video of the single was released on 27 November 2015 and the music video was released on 5 February 2016.

== Reception ==
Puede Nang Mangarap was met with generally positive reviews from music critics. At MYX Daily Top 10, on 29 June 2015 the album received an average score of 9, which indicates "generally favorable reviews", based on 10 reviews.

=== Commercial performance ===
Puede Nang Mangarap debuted at number one in the Philippines.

== Track listing ==
The tracks were co-written by Andrei Panaligan, Jude Gitamondoc, Jamie Rivera, Celso Abenoja, Nonong Pedero, Willy Cruz and Vehnee Saturno. MCA Music Inc was the executive producer and Jungee Marcelo is the producer.

No.	Title	Length
1	Puede Nang Mangarap	4:02
2	Malalampasan	4:42
3	Iingatan Ka	5:33
4	Sa Isang Awit	4:46
5	Ngumiti Ka Lang	3:32
6	Kung Kaya Mong Isipin	4:27
7	Tayo Ay Maglaro	3:16
8	Puede Nang Mangarap (Remix)	5:29
	Total length	35:47

Puede Nang Mangarap (Deluxe Edition)
No.	Title	Length
9.	"Heto Na Yan"	3:58
10.	"Ikaw Ay Ako (with Elha Nympha)"	4:07
11.	"Tayo Ay Maglaro (feat. Reynan Dal-Anay)"	3:17
Total length:		47:09

== Release history ==
Puede Nang Mangarap release history
Region	Date	Format(s)	Edition(s)	Label	Ref.
Various	September 26, 2025	Digital download; streaming	Standard	MCA Music Inc.	
Various	September 30, 2016	Digital download; streaming	Deluxe Edition	MCA Music Inc.	
