= Darren Espanto =

Filipino actor and singer (born 2001)

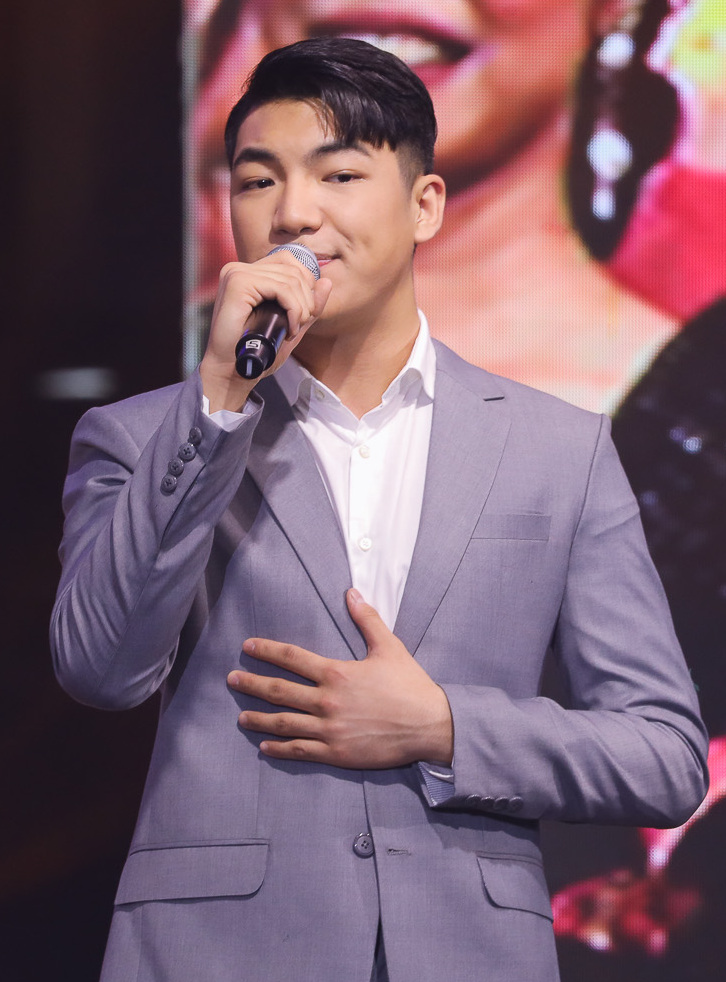
- Espanto in 2023
- Born: Darren Lyndon Espanto (Note: Darren Espanto was born in Canada. Thus, he does not possess his mother's maiden name which is Gonzales.); May 24, 2001 (age 25); Calgary, Alberta, Canada
- Citizenship: Canada; Philippines
- Occupations: Singer; actor; television personality
- Years active: 2011–present
- Musical career
- Genres: Pop; OPM; Broadway
- Instruments: Vocals; piano; percussions; saxophone
- Labels: Corus (2012–2013); Sony (2012–2013); Star Magic (2014–present); UMG Philippines (2014–present); Republic Records Philippines (2022–present); Star Music (2023–present)

Darren Lyndon Espanto (born May 24, 2001) is a Filipino singer, television personality, and actor. He first appeared on television as a contestant on YTV's reality competition series The Next Star (2012) and later gained wider recognition after joining the first season of The Voice Kids Philippines (2014), where he finished as runner-up. Espanto was subsequently signed to ABS-CBN's Star Magic talent agency, and has since established an entertainment career in the Philippines. He is a mainstay host on ABS-CBN's noontime variety show It's Showtime (2024–present).

== Early life and education ==
Darren Lyndon Espanto was born in Calgary, Alberta, Canada on May 24, 2001. He is the eldest child of Filipino registered nurses Marinel Gonzales and Lyndon Espanto, who emigrated to Canada from Nueva Ecija and Nueva Vizcaya provinces in the Philippines. In a concert, Espanto identified Muñoz, Nueva Ecija as his hometown.

Espanto also has a younger sister, Lynelle. He speaks Tagalog. Espanto started singing at the age of three. As a toddler, he sang tunes like "Hakuna Matata" from The Lion King to his parents. When his family realized his talents, they urged him to pursue singing as a career. In an interview aired on Fast Talk with Boy Abunda on April 16, 2024, Espanto discussed aspects of his personal relationships, including past romantic interests and a then-current relationship. In August 2024, Espanto underwent an emergency appendectomy.

Espanto, along with the other The Voice Kids finalists, received a ₱350,000 scholarship from Eton International School. After relocating to the Philippines, he attended Eton International School and later transitioned to homeschooling under The Homeschool of Asia Pacific. He completed his senior high school education with honors, receiving second honors in Grade 11 and graduating with first honors in Grade 12. He also received the Achiever Award and the Excellence in Music and Arts Award.

== Career ==
At age 10, Espanto won the main finals of the Pinoy Singing Sensation competition in Edmonton on August 20, 2011.

=== 2012–2013: The Next Star ===
In 2012, ten-year-old Espanto auditioned for the fifth season of YTV's The Next Star, performing Bruno Mars' "Grenade". Judge Keshia Chanté praised his vocal control, while judge Mark Spicoluk commented on his stage presence. Espanto advanced after receiving a “golden ticket” from the judges.

He reached the competition's Top 6, the youngest finalist in the show's history to do so. His performances on the show included renditions of Rihanna's "Only Girl (in the World)" and Maroon 5's "Payphone" among others. He released the single "Gotta Give A Little Extra", as well as "Now" and "Oh Oh Santa" with the other five finalists. Espanto placed second in the competition after performing his original single in the finals.

In 2013, Espanto made his acting debut with a guest role on YTV's Life with Boys.

=== 2014: The Voice Kids ===
Espanto auditioned for the inaugural season of ABS-CBN’s The Voice Kids Philippines with a performance of Jessie J's "Domino". Coaches Sarah Geronimo and Bamboo Mañalac turned their chairs for him. Espanto later chose Geronimo as his coach.

Espanto advanced to the finals after singing Whitney Houston's "One Moment in Time" during the live semi-finals. He received the second-highest number of votes, after Lyca Gairanod. Judge Lea Salonga commented on his performance, while his mentor, Sarah Geronimo, described him as “a winner and a complete package”. He also performed "Somebody To Love" by Justin Bieber alongside other Star Magic artists.

In the finale, during the first round with a power ballad theme, Espanto performed Basil Valdez's song "Ngayon," which received a standing ovation. Lea Salonga left a warning to older performers, saying: "To every person Darren idolized, this is a warning to all of you: this kid will outshine you someday". (Note: Translated from the Filipino language: "... Sa lahat ng iniidolo ngayon ni Darren, ito ay isang babala sa inyo: ilalampaso kayo ng batang ito balang araw".) Geronimo also commented on his performance, noting his willingness to listen to guidance despite his talent.

In the final round, Espanto accompanied himself on the piano while performing “You Are My Song” in a duet with the song’s original performer, Martin Nievera, which also received a standing ovation. He ultimately finished in second place, again behind Lyca Gairanod.

==== Performances ====
Stage	Song	Original artist	Date	Order	Result
Blind Audition	"Domino"	Jessie J	June 1, 2014	4.12	Sarah Geronimo and Bamboo Mañalac turned (Joined Team Sarah)
Battle Rounds	"What Makes You Beautiful" (vs. JM and JC Urquico vs. Sam Shoaf)	One Direction	July 12, 2014	15.2	Saved by Sarah
Sing-offs	"Listen"	Beyoncé	July 13, 2014	16.1	Saved by Sarah
Live (Semifinals)	"One Moment in Time"	Whitney Houston	July 19, 2014	17.3	Saved by Public Votes (2nd Highest Votes)
Live (Finals)	"Ngayon"	Basil Valdez	July 26, 2014	19.3	Runner-up
Live (Finals)	"Somebody To Love"	Justin Bieber	July 26, 2014	19.8	Runner-up
Live (Finals)	"You Are My Song" (with Martin Nievera)	Martin Nievera	July 27, 2014	20.1	Runner-up

=== 2014–2016 ===
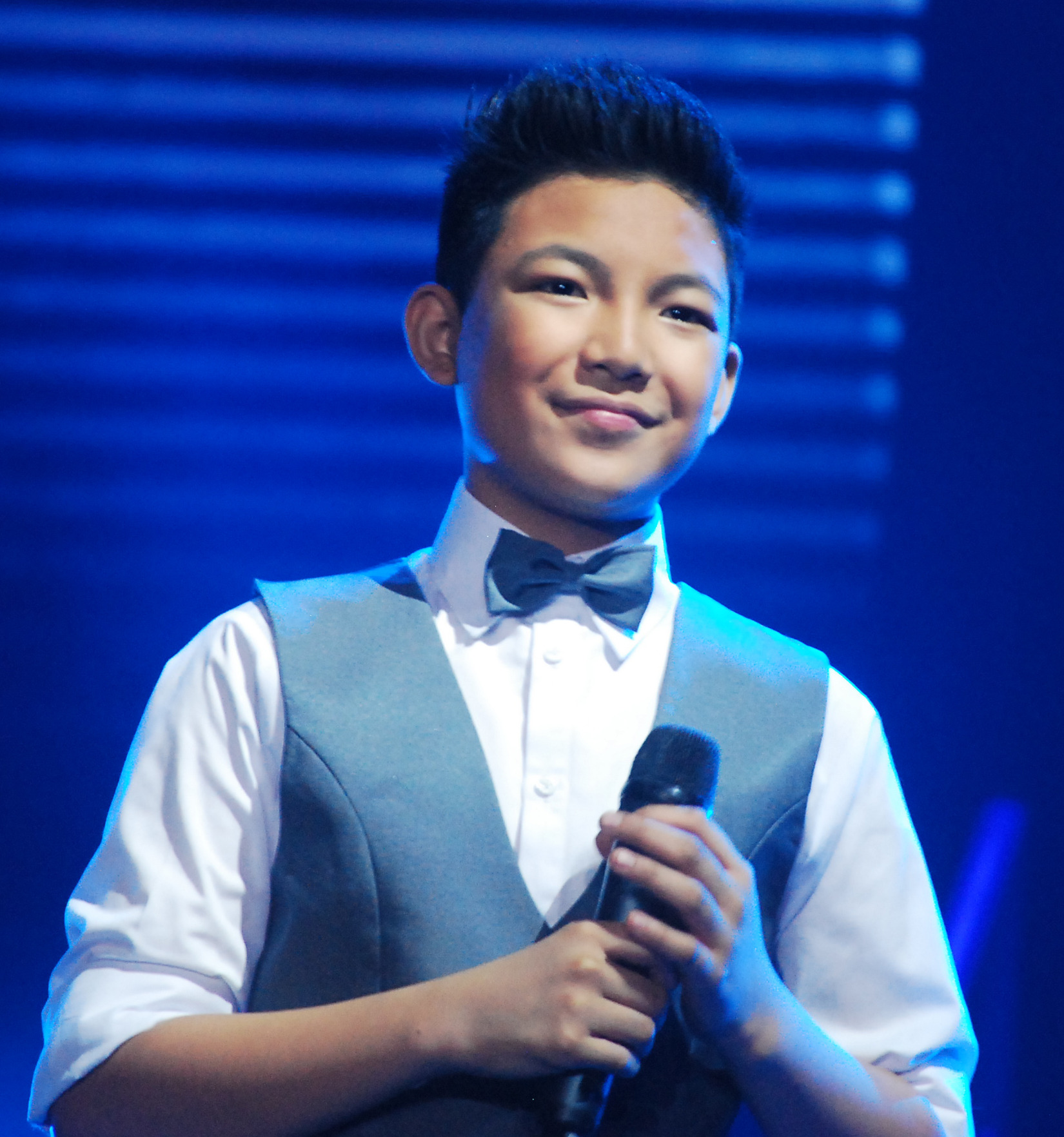
Espanto in 2015

In 2014, Espanto said that he will not return to Calgary, and he was staying in the Philippines to try acting and do a project with his coach and mentor, Sarah Geronimo. In August, Espanto became a part of ABS-CBN's training and management center Star Magic. On September 11, Espanto's rendition of Whitney Houston's "One Moment in Time" topped the Philippine charts of Apple's iTunes store, while his rendition of Justin Bieber's "Somebody to Love" placed second.

He then staged his first solo concert at the Music Museum; a repeat of the concert was staged on December 19, 2014. On October 25, he made his Carnegie Hall debut as the headliner at the Fourth The Outstanding Filipino Americans in New York Awards, which celebrated Filipino American History Month in New York City. On November 18, his rendition of "O Little Town of Bethlehem" topped the iTunes chart, while his rendition of Jessie J's "Domino" placed second, in which the two were the only local songs to be included on the top 15. And on November 29, Espanto signed a record and management deal with MCA Music Inc. (Philippines). A week after, he and the other three finalists of The Voice Kids (Lyca Gairanod, Juan Karlos Labajo, and Darlene Vibares) held a concert at the Philippine International Convention Center. He also released his first solo album, "Darren", with MCA Music Inc. (Philippines). It debuted at number 1 on Philippine charts of Apple's iTunes Store upon its release on December 8.

On January 18, 2015, Espanto performed Trina Belamide's "Tell The World of His Love" (the theme for World Youth Day 1995) at the University of Santo Tomás in Manila for Pope Francis's visit to the Philippines. On May 29, Espanto performed at the Mall of Asia Arena for his birthday concert, making him the youngest performer to stage a solo event in the venue. On November 18, Espanto was among several performers at a state dinner hosted by President Benigno Aquino III in Malacañang Palace, for a delegation from Mexico led by President Enrique Peña Nieto. Later that month, Espanto was chosen to sing the official theme for the Asia-Pacific Economic Cooperation (APEC) Economic Leaders' Meeting, titled "This is Only the Beginning", composed by National Artist Ryan Cayabyab.

In 2016, Espanto released his sophomore album "Be With Me". The album contains eleven songs from the singer, two of which are his original compositions. On July 31, 2016, Espanto opened for the Philippine leg of Selena Gomez's Revival tour.

=== 2017-2019 ===
On May 4, 2017, during his Twitter party, Espanto surprised his fans with a deluxe edition of his sophomore solo album entitled Be With Me, to be released the following day. Be With Me (Deluxe Edition) contains 5 bonus tracks: "I'll Be There" with Jed Madela, Acoustic versions of "7 Minutes" and "Alam", the viral hit, his cover of Sia's "Chandelier", and a stripped version of Young Hearts with Malaysian pop singer Nik Qistina.

In 2018, Espanto made his acting debut in The Hows of Us. Espanto also became a member of the teen pop group ASAP G! Other members of the group are Isabela Vinzon, Jayda Avanzado, Ylona Garcia, Jeremy Glinoga and Kyle Echarri. The group formed on June 3, 2018, and disbanded in November 2018, when the show was reformatted into ASAP Natin 'To.

In 2019, Espanto was part of The Aces concert with fellow singers Lani Misalucha and Jonalyn Viray. The trio performed in Cebu, Davao, and Manila (at the Araneta Coliseum). Espanto and Viray, so called the Pair of Aces, also conducted a tour in Canada (Calgary, Winnipeg and Toronto) in the latter part of the year. On April 12, he also appeared as the only Filipino guest performer in the grand finals of Singer 2019 in China. This was followed by the release of "A Whole New World" on May 24, wherein he and Morissette collaborated to perform the rendition of the song as part of the Philippine promotion of the movie Aladdin as handpicked by Disney. On November 25, the theme song for the ASEAN-ROK Commemorative Summit titled "Side by Side" was launched, where he participated as one of the 11 ASEAN singers representing each member country. And on November 29, he released his single "Sasagipin Kita" which he wrote himself, also under MCA Music Inc. (Philippines) where it debuted at number 1 on the Philippine charts of Apple's iTunes store on the first day of its release.

=== 2020-2023 ===
On May 24, 2020, Espanto celebrated his 19th birthday through an online benefit concert entitled "D Birthday Concert from Home". The concert was streamed live via Espanto's Facebook page and garnered around 12,000 viewers and 251,000 views. Through this event, he was able to raise P838,206.69 which was donated to his home network, ABS-CBN Pantawid ng Pag-ibig program. On June 12, 2020, Espanto, in his capacity as UNDP Philippines Youth Advocate, became part of United Nations Development Programme's #Mission1Point5 climate action global campaign in coordination with The Good Co. via its social media platforms (@thegoodquote) with millions of followers worldwide. On June 14, 2020, Espanto joined the iWant ASAP Online show as host along with the iWant ASAP squad, Robi Domingo, Maymay Entrata and Edward Barber (actor), weekly episode of which airs every Sunday. On July 31, 2020, Espanto and Jayda Avanzado released a collaboration for the track revival "Sana Tayo Na" under Star Music followed by the release of the official music video on the same day. On August 12, 2020, Espanto, also in his capacity as UNDP Youth Advocate, was invited as a keynote speaker for the International Youth Day Youth Forum 2020 with the theme "Building a Better Normal with the Youth", in coordination with IdeasPositive. This event was streamed live via the Facebook Page of Ideas Positive and partners. On October 23, 2020, Espanto as UNDP Youth Advocate, together with Ria Atayde, hosted the UN75 anniversary celebration in the Philippines with the theme "UN75 2020 & Beyond: Shaping the Future Together", which was streamed live via the UN Philippines's FB Page. On November 13, 2020, Espanto released his Christmas single, "Believe in Christmas", under MCA Music Inc. (Philippines). The song reached the number 1 spot of Apple's iTunes store Philippine charts just two hours after its debut. The official music video was released a week after and hit more than a 100,000 views within days after its upload on YouTube.

On February 13, 2021, Espanto released his cover of LANY's song entitled, "If This Is The Last Time", as part of a project with various artists under MCA Music Inc. (Philippines), in coordination with Universal Music Group. On February 20, 2021, Espanto and AC Bonifacio joined the Your Face Sounds Familiar (Philippine season 3) family as online hosts via the KaFamiliar Online and other digital platforms, weekly episode of which airs every Saturday and Sunday. On April 18, 2021, Espanto did a homecoming production on ASAP Natin 'To where he was formally launched as "Asia's Pop Heartthrob" Darren. On May 28, 2021, Espanto released his newest single written and produced by Zack Tabudlo with the title, "Tama Na", under MCA Music Inc. (Philippines). The song climbed to number 3 of Apple's iTunes store Philippines in the first two hours of its release. On June 9, 2021, Espanto was launched as the main host for the weekly online show for TNT PH called TNT PopShow, along with co-host Adrianna So. On June 19, 2021, Espanto has successfully held a sold-out digital concert called "Darren: Home Run (The Comeback Concert)". A re-run of this event was made available on June 20, 2021. Also on June 20, 2021, Espanto and his team released the official music video of "Tama Na" which secured the top spot of music videos on Apple's iTunes store Philippines a day after its release, and reached Top 10 of YouTube's trending videos in music on its first week. On July 11, 2021, Espanto was the special guest performer on the 2021 Bb. Pilipinas' Coronation Night where he performed "Together We Fly" composed and re-arranged by Ms. Chochay Magno. On August 27, 2021, Star Music released the "Marry Me, Marry You" official soundtrack album which includes tracks interpreted by various artists including Espanto who interpreted the main OST of the series also entitled "Marry Me, Marry You". The song skyrocketed to number 10 of the Apple's iTunes store on the day of its release.

On April 1, 2022, Espanto released his latest track, "Pabalik Sa'yo" under UMUSIC Philippines. The track and the lyric video claimed the No. 3 and No. 1 spots of Apple's iTunes store Philippines an hour after its release. On April 26, 2022, Espanto was part of the special guests of P-pop group Calista's debut concert Vax to Normal. Espanto is also part of the EZ Mil: Panalo Homecoming Tour 2022 which kicked off on April 29, 2022, at the New Frontier Theater. On June 9, 2022, Espanto is one of the Southeast Asian artists who collaborated with English music sensation, Calum Scott for the version of Scott's track, "Heaven". The song climbed to No. 2 of iTunes store Philippines immediately after its release. On June 11, 2022, Espanto is also one of Anne Curtis' guest artists in her Luv-Anne: The Comeback Concert held at the Resorts World Manila. In July 2022, Espanto was part of Vice Ganda's Fully VICE-cinated US Tour 2022 which includes performances in California, Seattle and New Jersey. On July 8, 2022, Republic Records Philippines was launched and it will house known recording artists, including Espanto. The same date, the teaser for Lyric and Beat, a musical series under Dreamscape Entertainment was released which stars Espanto among the main casts. The series premiered on August 10, 2022, on iWantTFC. Among the series' soundtracks, "Pagbigyang Muli" and "Duyan" interpreted by Espanto reached No. 5 of iTunes store Philippines' Top Songs a few hours after their release.

In 2023, Espanto performed in various events such as New Year's Eve (SM Mall of Asia) and Chinese New Year Countdowns (Chinatown), and national festivities. On February 21, 2023, Espanto was launched as the newest Hurado in "Tawag ng Tanghalan", a segment of It's Showtime, a daily noontime show airing on Kapamilya Channel and A2Z Channel 11.

=== 2024 ===
As of 2024, It's Showtime moved to GMA Network replacing TAPE Inc.'s Tahanang Pinakamasaya before expanded it broadcast into All TV nearly two months later and Darren was introduced as one of the hosts of the show at the contract signing.

== Other activities ==
=== Philanthropy ===
On April 15, 2020, the United Nations Development Programme under its Philippine office debuted Espanto as its first-ever celebrity Youth Advocate to promote its sustainable development goals (SDGs), focusing on climate action, biodiversity conservation, and youth empowerment. On September 29, 2021, Espanto was reappointed Youth Advocate for a second term.

On January 16, 2022, Espanto was the featured performer on the "By Request (a Benefit Concert)" series launched by ABS-CBN which raised a total of ₱464,000 in aid for victims of Typhoon Odette.

== Achievements ==
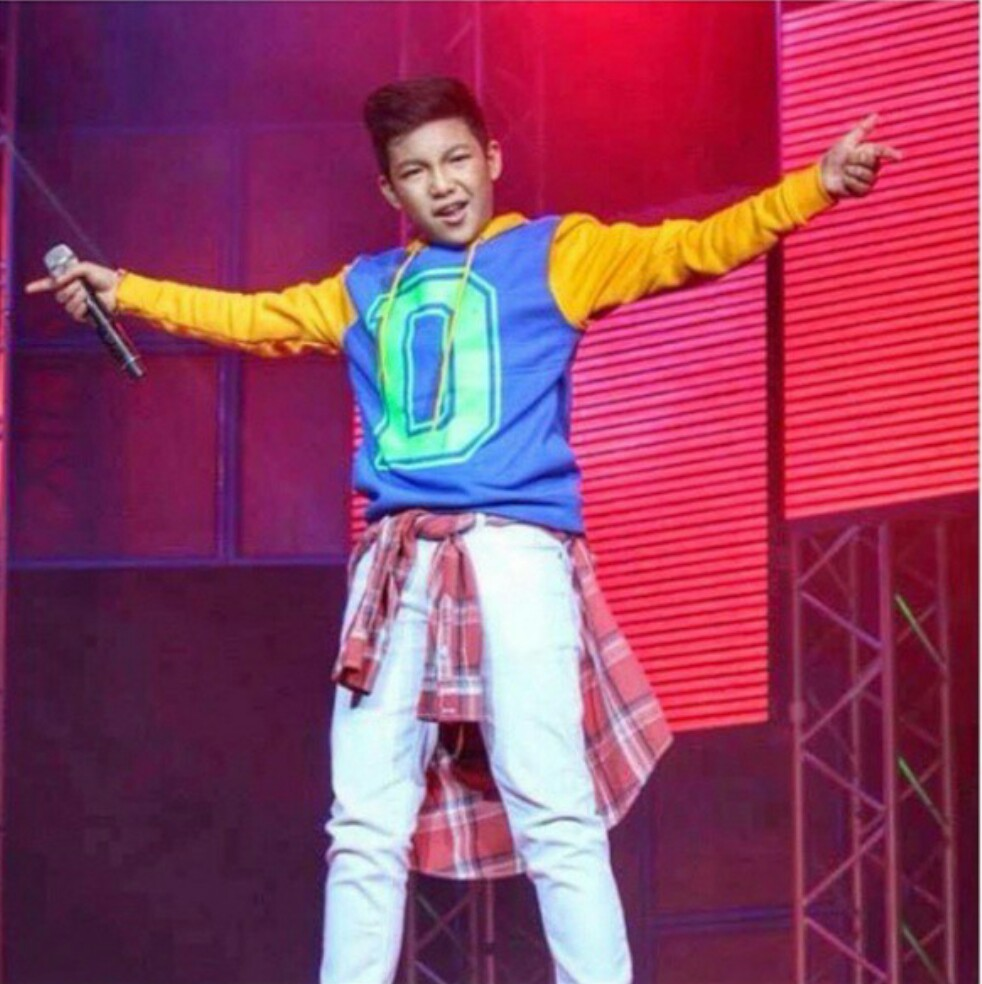
Espanto performing in 2014

Dubbed as "Asia's Pop Hearthrob" by various media outlets, Espanto was the youngest artist to headline a sold-out solo major concert at MOA Arena. He has accumulated over 70 awards and recognitions including 15 Wish Music Awards, 8 Awit Awards, 8 Myx Music Awards, 8 Push Awards and 7 EdukCircle Awards. He performed for Pope Francis during the 2015 Papal Visit in UST. He has also headlined a gala at the legendary Carnegie Hall in New York and performed for presidents and dignitaries during the ASEAN Summits and APEC. He was recently appointed as the first celebrity Youth Advocate for the Sustainable Development Goals (SDGs).

Espanto is one of the country's most successful & top-selling artists of the decade, Billboard reported that his self-titled debut album "Darren" has been certified 2× Platinum in the Philippines, selling over 30,000 units in the country, while his sophomore release "Be With Me" sold 15,000 units (certified Gold) respectively.

=== Chart performance ===
List of other charted songs, with selected chart positions and album name
Title	Year	Peak chart positions		Album
Title	Year	PH		Album
Title	Year	Hit Chart	Pinoy	Album
"Somebody to Love"	2014	3	1	The Voice Kids: The Album
"In Love Ako Sa'Yo"	2015	1	1	Darren
"Stuck"	2015	1	1	Darren
"Build a Girl"	2015	3	3	Darren Espanto: The Early Years
"Makin' Moves"	2015	1	1	Darren
"7 Minutes"	2016	1	1	Be With Me
"Starlight"	2016	1	1	Be With Me
"Parachute"	2016	1	1	Be With Me
"Alam"	2016	1	1	Be With Me
"I'll Be There" (with Jed Madela)	2017	1	1	Life Songs: MMK 25 (Commemorative Album)
"Pasko Na"	2017	2	1	D's Christmas
"Dying Inside to Hold You"	2017	2	2	All of You (Official Soundtrack)
"Poison"	2018	1	1	Non-album singles
"Sasagipin Kita"	2019	2	2	Non-album singles
"Sana Tayo Na" (with Jayda Avanzado)	2020	2	1	Non-album singles
"Believe in Christmas"	2020	5	3	Non-album singles
"Tama Na"	2021	3	2	Non-album singles
"Marry Me, Marry You"	2021	7	5	Non-album singles
"Pabalik Sa'yo"	2022	7	6	Non-album singles
"Bibitaw Na"	2023	7	4	
"Iyo"	2024	6	6	

== Discography ==
=== Studio albums ===
Album
Year	Album title	Recording label	Certification	Check it out here
2014	The Voice Kids: The Album	UMG Philippines	Gold	The Voice Kids: The Album
2014	Darren	UMG Philippines	Double Platinum	Darren Deluxe
2016	Be With Me	UMG Philippines	Platinum	Be With Me
2017	Be With Me (Deluxe Edition)	UMG Philippines	Platinum	Be With Me (Deluxe Edition)
2017	D's Christmas	UMG Philippines	N/A	N/A

=== Special albums ===
Album
Year	Album title	Recording label	Certification
2015	The Next Star Chronicles: The Early Years	Ivory Music	N/A

=== Singles ===
List of singles, showing year released and album name
Title	Year	Album
"In Love Ako Sayo"	2014	Darren
"Stuck"	2015	Darren
"Makin' Moves"	2015	Darren
"7 Minutes"	2016	Be With Me
"Starlight"	2016	Be With Me
"Parachute"	2016	Be With Me
"Alam"	2016	Be With Me
"Poison"	2018	Non-album singles
"Sasagipin Kita"	2019	Non-album singles
"Sana Tayo Na" (with Jayda Avanzado)	2020	Non-album singles
"Believe in Christmas"	2020	Non-album singles
"Tama Na"	2021	Non-album singles
"Pabalik Sa'yo"	2022	Non-album singles
"Heaven" (with Calum Scott)	2022	Non-album singles
"Bibitaw Na"	2023	Non-album singles
"Iyo"	2024	Non-album singles

=== Promotional singles ===
List of promotional singles, showing year released and album name
Title	Year	Album
"Now"	2011	YTV's The Next Star – Season 5
"Oh Oh Santa" (with Brooklyn Roebuck, Ryan Hawken, Amer Dhaliwal, Grace Johnston, and Issy Dahl)	2011	YTV's The Next Star – Season 5
"Thank You, Ang Babait Ninyo"	2014	ABS-CBN Christmas Station ID 2014
"Lord Merry Christmas"	2014	My Christmas Album: All-Stars
"Chandelier"	2016	The Hottest Pinoy Hits ... Ever!
"I'll Be There" (with Jed Madela)	2016	Life Songs (MMK Commemorative Album)
"Dying Inside to Hold You" (All of You (2017 film))	2017	Non-album single
"A Whole New World" (with Morissette)	2019	Non-album single
"Marry Me, Marry You"	2021	Marry Me, Marry You (Original Soundtrack)
"Lyric & Beat" (various artists)	2022	Lyric and Beat, Vol 01 (Original Soundtrack)
"Jonathan Manalo Overture" (various artists)	2022	Lyric and Beat, Vol 01 (Original Soundtrack)
"Tara Tena" (various artists)	2022	Lyric and Beat, Vol 01 (Original Soundtrack)
"Pagbigyang Muli"	2022	Lyric and Beat, Vol 02 (Original Soundtrack)
"Pangarap Kong Pangarap Mo" (with Sheena Belarmino)	2022	Lyric and Beat, Vol 02 (Original Soundtrack)
"Power of the Dream" (with Sheena Belarmino)	2022	Lyric and Beat, Vol 02 (Original Soundtrack)
"Duyan"	2022	Lyric and Beat, Vol 03 (Original Soundtrack)
"Pangarap Kong Pangarap Mo" (various artists)	2022	Lyric and Beat, Vol 03 (Original Soundtrack)
"Bakit Lumuluha?" (with Sheena Belarmino, Andrea Brillantes)	2022	Lyric and Beat, Vol 04 (Original Soundtrack)
"Lyric and Beat (Final Competition Version)" (various artists)	2022	Lyric and Beat, Vol 04 (Original Soundtrack)
"First Day Vibe" (with AC Bonifacio)	2022	Non-album single
"Smile Again" (theme song of Masskara Festival 2022)	2022	Non-album single
"Panghabang Ikaw"		The Secrets of Hotel 88 (Original Soundtrack)

== Filmography ==
=== Television ===
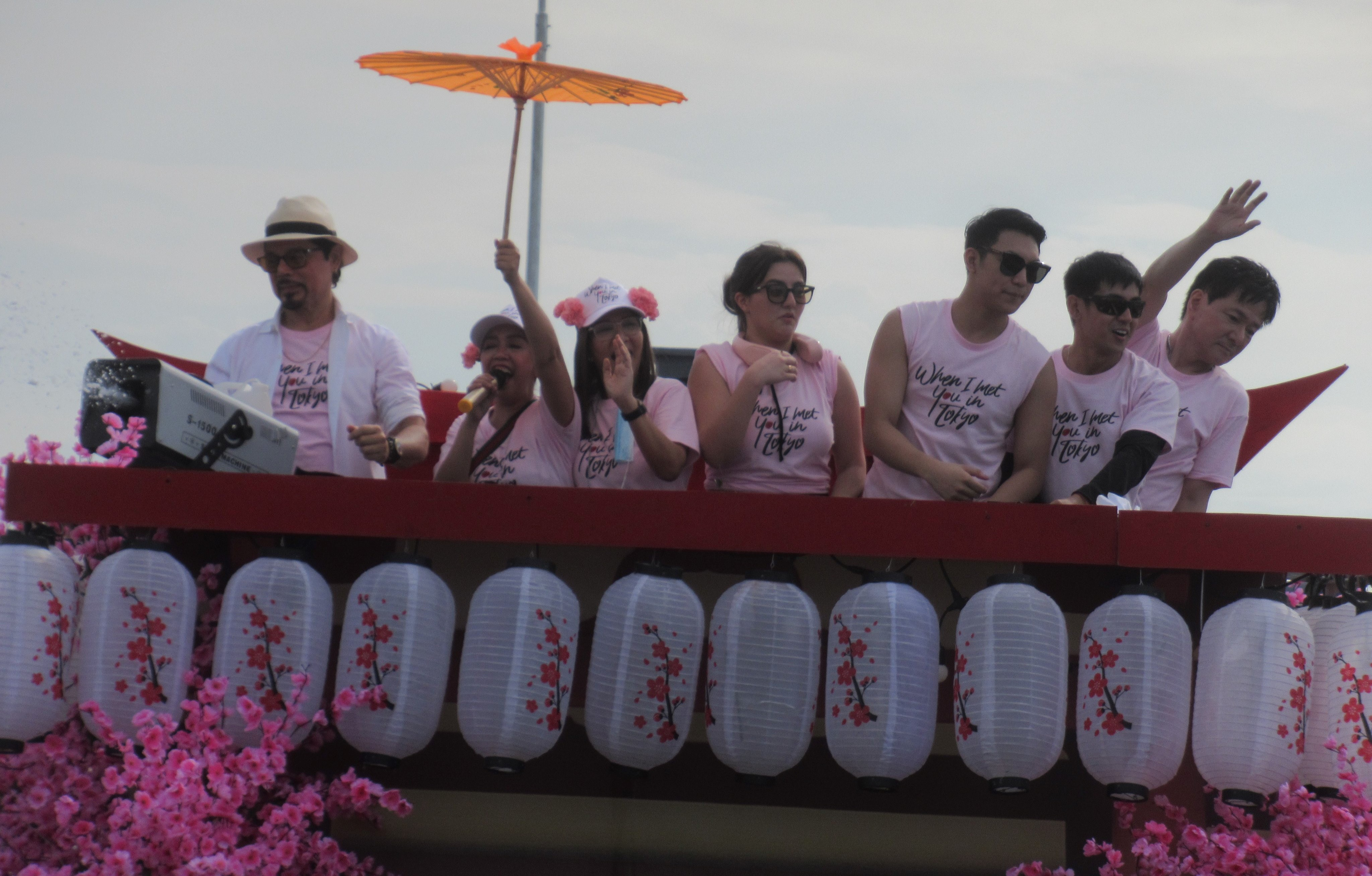
Espanto (third to the right), along with the cast from When I Met You in Tokyo in the 2023 Metro Manila Film Festival in Navotas

Television
Year	Show	Network	Date aired	Notes
2012	The Next Star	YTV	July 16 – December 18	Himself
2013	Life with Boys	YTV	July 23	Himself (Cameo)
2014	The Voice Kids	ABS-CBN	June 1 – July 27	Himself
2015 – present	ASAP	ABS-CBN		Himself (Performer)
2022	Marry Me, Marry You	Kapamilya Channel, A2Z	September 13, 2021 – January 21, 2022	Himself
2022 – 2023	Dream Maker: Search for the Next Global Pop Group	Kapamilya Channel, A2Z	November 19, 2022 – February 12, 2023	Himself (mentor)
2023 – present	It's Showtime	Kapamilya Channel, A2Z, ALLTV, GMA Network, GTV, TV5	February 21, 2023 – present	Himself (Regular host / Tawag ng Tanghalan Hurado)
2023	Can't Buy Me Love	Kapamilya Channel, A2Z, TV5	October 16, 2023 — May 10, 2024	Stephen Tanhueco
2025	Rainbow Rumble	Kapamilya Channel, A2Z, ALLTV	October 19	Himself (Contestant)
2026	Your Face Sounds Familiar (season 4)	Kapamilya Channel, A2Z, ALLTV	January 18	Round 8 Guest Performer as Gary Valenciano

=== Digital ===
Online Show/Series
Year	Show	Platform	Date aired	Notes
2020–present	iWantASAP	iWant and iWanTFC digital platforms	June 14	Himself (Host / Performer)
2021	Your Face Sounds Familiar PH / KaFamiliar Online	YourFacePH/KaFamiliar Online, Kapamilya/iWanTFC digital platforms	February 20	Himself (Host)
2021	TNT PopShow	TNTPh digital platforms	June 9	Himself (Host)
2022	Lyric and Beat	iWantTFC digital platforms	August 10	Jazz Espiritu (main cast)

=== Film ===
Year	Title	Role	Notes	Ref.
2018	The Hows of Us	Yohan Silva	Debut film appearance	
2023	When I Met You in Tokyo	Jomar		

== Concerts ==
=== As Concert Headliner ===
Solo concerts
Year	Title	Details	Notes	Ref.
2014	The Total Performance Concert	Date: October 4, Saturday; Venue: Music Museum, Greenhills, San Juan; Produced by: Aqueous Events Management	First major solo concert	
2014	Homecoming Concert	The Total Performer Returns - November 7 at the Grey Eagle Casino Event Center, Calgary AB Canada; Thank You Canada - November 8 at the Mirage Banquet Hall, Edmonton AB Canada		
2014	The Total Performance Concert 2	Date: December 19, Friday; Venue: Music Museum, Greenhills, San Juan; Produced by: Aqueous Events Management	The Repeat Concert	
2015	The Canada Concert Tour	The Voice of Darren Espanto Live in Ottawa - January 4 at the Bronson Centre Inc., Ottawa, Ontario, Canada; The Voice of Darren Espanto Live In Toronto - January 13 at the Toronto Pavilion, 190 Railside Road, Canada		
2015	The Total Performance Concert 3	Date: January 23; Venue: Albay Astrodome; Produced by: Aqueous Events Management	The 2nd Repeat Concert (Finale)	
2015	Darren Espanto: D' Birthday Concert	Date: May 29, Friday; Venue: Mall of Asia Arena; Produced by: MCA Music Inc.	The Major Birthday Concert	
2015	Canada Concert Tour	Darren Live in Edmonton - October 3 at the Radisson Hotel and Convention Center; Darren Live in Calgary - October 4 at the Jack Singer Concert Hall		
2015	D' Road Tour	October 9 - Araullo University Gymnasium; October 10 - AUF Sports and Cultural Center; October 23 - SMX Davao; November 13 - Waterfront Cebu City Hotel and Casino; December 12 - University of Baguio		
2016	D Total Experience	Date: June 25, Saturday; Venue: Kia Theater, Cubao, Quezon City; Produced by: EG Entertainment Services	2nd major solo concert	
2016	One Music Digital Concert Series Presents: The Other Side of DARREN	Date: October 30, Sunday; Venue: ABS-CBN Compound; Produced by: One Music PH	Digital concert	
2016	D Total Experience with Live Band	Date: November 18, Friday; Venue: Santa Clara Convention Center, Santa Clara, California		
2017	Now Playing: DARREN	Date: April 14, Friday; Venue: TFC Studio, Daly City, CA; Produced by: TFC, OneMusic		
2018	UNSTOPPABLE	Date: May 26, Saturday; Venue: Kia Theatre, Cubao, Quezon City	3rd major solo concert	
2020	D' Birthday Concert From Home	Date: May 24, Sunday; Venue: broadcast via Facebook Live	with special guests Mr. Gary Valenciano and Moira Dela Torre	
2021	Darren: Home Run (The Comeback Concert)	Date: June 19, Saturday (June 20 - rerun); Venue: Digital Concert (KTX, iWantTFC, TFC iPTV, Sky Cable); Produced by: ABS-CBN Events		
2022	By Request: A Benefit Concert (featuring Darren)	Date: January 16, Sunday; Venue: Digital Concert (Kumu, iWantTFC, ABS-CBN FB/YT channels); Produced by: ABS-CBN and ABS-CBN Foundation	a concert series launched for the benefit of the victims of Typhoon Odette	
2024	DARREN: D10 Anniversary Concert	• Date: June 1, Saturday • Venue: Smart Araneta Coliseum • Produced by: ABS-CBN Events	with special guests Vice Ganda, Sarah Geronimo, Gary Valenciano, Ogie Alcasid, Erik Santos and Lyca Gairanod	

=== As Supporting Act or Guest Performer ===
Year	Title	Details	Notes	Ref.
2014	Boses ng Bulilit... Kami Ulit!	Date: July 31, Thursday; Venue: Resorts World Manila; Studio: ABS-CBN	The Voice Kids	
2014	Lani Misalucha's Concert, the Philippine Tour	Date: August 22, Friday; Venue: Waterfront Cebu City Hotel and Casino	Guest with Lyca Gairanod	
2014	Lani Misalucha's Concert, the Philippine Tour	Date: August 29, Friday; Venue: SMX Convention Center, Davao	Guest with Lyca Gairanod	
2014	Jed Madela All Requests 2	Date: September 12, Friday; Venue: Music Museum, Greenhills, San Juan	Guest	
2014	The Voice of Mitoy, Klarrise, Darren	November 21 - Massey Theatre, Vancouver, BC, Canada; November 23 - Century Casino, Calgary, AB, Canada	with Mitoy Yonting and Klarisse De Guzman	
2014	The Voice Kids ALL IN: THE CONCERT	Date - December 6; Venue - PICC Plenary Hall	The Voice Kids	
2015	The Voice Kids ALL IN: THE CONCERT	The Voice Kids All In Sinulog The Concert; Date: January 17; Venue: Waterfront Hotel and Casino, Cebu	The Voice Kids	
2015	Bamboo World Tour	Date: March 15, Sunday; Venue: Singapore Expo Max Pavilion	The Voice Kids	
2015	Little Voices: Live in Australia	Little Voices Live in Brisbane - March 21 at the Diverciti Centre, Newmarket QLD; Little Voices Live in Adelaide - March 22 at the Norwood Concert Hall,178 The Parade, Norwood, SA; Little Voices Live in Sydney - March 27 at the St. Mary's Band Club, Oxley Park NSW; Little Voices Live in Melbourne - March 28 at the Millenium Reception and Function Centre, VIC	with Lyca Gairanod	
2015	Thor: Soulful Major Concert	Date: July 17, Friday; Venue: Music Museum, Greenhills, San Juan	Guest	
2015	Kyla Flying High	Date: November 20, Friday; Venue: Kia Theater, Cubao, Quezon City	Guest	
2015	Jessie J Live in manila	Date: December 10, Thursday; Venue: Kia Theater, Cubao, Quezon City	Front act	
2016	Heartthrobs Reloaded	Date: March 26 & 27, Saturday & Sunday; Venue: Pechanga Resort and Casino, Temecula, CA	with Piolo Pascual, Sam Milby and Pokwang	
2016	Selena Gomez The Revival Tour Live in Manila	Date: July 31, Sunday; Venue: Mall of Asia Arena	Front act	
2017	Star Magic 25 - A Grand Celebration	Star Magic 25 Grand Celebration in Canada - April 9 at the Queen Elizabeth Theater, Vancouver, BC; Star Magic 25 Grand Celebration in the US - April 15 at the California's Great America, Santa Clara, CA	with Star Magic Artists	
2018	Alex Aiono: Manila Tour	Date: February 23, Friday; Venue: Uptown Mall	Special Guest	
2018	Alex Aiono: Manila Tour	Date: February 24, Saturday; Venue: Eastwood Mall Open Park, Eastwood City, Quezon City, Philippines	Special Guest	
2018	Alex Aiono: Manila Tour	Date: February 25, Sunday; Venue: Venice Grand Canal Mall, Taguig, Philippines	Special Guest	
2018	Millennial Voices: Australia Tour	Date: July 27, Friday; Venue: Club Marconi	with Morissette	
2018	Millennial Voices: Australia Tour	Date: July 28, Saturday; Venue: Planetshakers Centre	with Morissette	
2019	The Aces	Date: February 2, Saturday; Venue: Waterfront Cebu City Hotel and Casino, Cebu	w/ Ms. Lani Misalucha and Jonalyn Viray	
2019	The Aces	Date: March 2, Saturday; Venue: SMX Convention Center, Davao	w/ Ms. Lani Misalucha and Jonalyn Viray	
2019	The Aces	Date: March 30, Saturday; Venue: Araneta Coliseum, Manila	w/ Ms. Lani Misalucha and Jonalyn Viray	
2019	One Music X Festival (1MX)	Date: May 26, Sunday; Venue: Scape Playspace Orchard Link, Singapore	Various Artists	
2019	One Music X Festival (1MX)	Date: November 22, Friday; Venue: Centris Elements, Manila	Various Artists	
2019	The Pair of Aces	Date: October 12, Saturday; Venue: Grey Eagle Casino (Calgary), Alberta, Canada	w/ Jonalyn Viray	
2019	The Pair of Aces	Date: October 13, Sunday; Venue: Club Regent Event Center (Winnipeg), Manitoba, Canada	w/ Jonalyn Viray	
2019	The Pair of Aces	Date: October 19, Saturday; Venue: Toronto Pavilion, Toronto, Canada	w/ Jonalyn Viray	
2021	MPowered by Maymay Entrata	Date: November 26, Friday; Venue: online streaming via KTX.ph	guest performer	
2022	10Q: Ten Years of Angeline Quinto	Date: January 28, Friday; Venue: online streaming via KTX.ph	guest performer along with Gary Valenciano	
2022	Calista's Vax to Normal	Date: April 26, Tuesday; Venue: Smart Araneta Coliseum	guest performer along with various artists	
2022	EZ Mil: Panalo Homecoming Tour 2022	Date: April 29, Tuesday; Venue: New Frontier Theater (also known as Kia Theater)	guest performer along with various artists	
2022	Luv-Anne: The Comeback Concert	Date: June 11, Saturday; Venue: Newport Performing Arts Theater (Resorts World Manila)	guest performer along with various artists	
2022	Fully VICE-cinated US Tour 2022	Date: July 2 & 3, Saturday & Sunday; Venue: Pechanga Resort Casino, Temecula, California	guest performer along with various artists	
2022	Fully VICE-cinated US Tour 2022	Date: July 8, Friday; Venue: Angel of the Winds Arena, Seattle, Washington	guest performer along with various artists	
2022	Fully VICE-cinated US Tour 2022	Date: July 10, Sunday; Venue: Borgata Hotel Casino, Atlantic City, New Jersey	guest performer along with various artists	
2022	1MX London 2022	Date: October 1, Saturday; Venue: Apps Court Farm in London, UK	guest performer along with various artists	
2022	Mr. Music: The Hits of Jonathan Manalo	Date: October 15, Saturday; Venue: Newport Performing Arts Theater (Resorts World Manila)	guest performer along with various artists	
2022	Calum Scott: Bridges Asia Tour 2022 Live in Manila	Date: October 20, Thursday; Venue: New Frontier Theater	guest performer	
2022	UMUSIC FanVerse 2022	Date: October 22, Saturday; Venue: The Podium Hall	Various Artists	
2022	ENHYPEN Fun Meet in Manila	Date: December 3, Saturday; Venue: Araneta Coliseum	opening act	
