= Juan Karlos Labajo =

Filipino musician and actor (born 2001)

- Also known as: Juan Karlos; JK Labajo
- Born: Juan Karlos Labajo; February 5, 2001 (age 25)
- Origin: Consolacion, Cebu, Philippines
- Genres: Pop; soul; R&B; standard; jazz; Acoustic; Alternative rock; Pinoy rock
- Occupations: Singer; songwriter; actor; musician; endorser; photographer
- Instruments: Vocals; guitar; ukulele; piano; keyboards; drums
- Years active: 2014–present
- Labels: MCA Music Inc./Island Records Philippines (2014–present); Star Magic (2014–2017)

Juan Karlos Labajo (Tagalog: [hwan ˈkaɾlos lɐˈbaho]; born February 5, 2001) is a Filipino-German singer, songwriter, musician, and actor. Labajo rose to fame at age 13 when he finished third in the first season (2014) of The Voice Kids. He is the frontman and primary songwriter of his namesake band Juan Karlos. He has since released two studio albums as a solo artist and three studio albums with his band.

As an actor, he had supporting roles in the ABS-CBN television series Hawak-Kamay (2014), Pangako Sa 'Yo (2015–16), A Love to Last (2017), and Senior High (2023–24). He was also a celebrity housemate in the reality show Pinoy Big Brother: Lucky 7 (2016). In film, Labajo was nominated for the Gawad Urian Award for Best Supporting Actor for his role in Blue Room (2022). He also portrayed Senator Ninoy Aquino in the musical biopic Ako si Ninoy (2023), and the adult version of the titular kid in the coming-of-age drama film Lolo and the Kid (2024).

== Early life and background ==
Labajo was born on February 5, 2001, and raised in Consolacion, Cebu by his mother, Maylinda Labajo. His German father left them when he was still a baby. His mother died when he was twelve years old, on November 17, 2013. He now lives with his uncle Jovanni and grandmother Linda in Metro Manila.

Growing up, Labajo experienced bullying, especially in school. The bullies, who usually acted in groups, teased and punched him because of his looks. Although his Caucasian appearance gave the impression that his family was well-off, they were actually in debt but still able to afford the luxurious life. (Note: "Marami pong nag aakala na, 'Uy mayaman 'yan!' Dahil nga daw po sa mukha ko. Pero 'di po nila alam, sa Cebu ang dami po naming utang, nangungupahan lang kami, palipat-lipat ng bahay." ("A lot of people seem to think, "Hey, this kid's rich!", just because of my face. But what they don't know was that in Cebu, my family was in massive debt, we didn't have a permanent home, and we always moved from house to house.")) He later revealed that at the time he made the semi-finals of The Voice Kids, his grandmother asked for financial support from Cebu governor Hilario Davide III. Although the amount was only ₱100, he was still grateful for the governor's support.

== Acting career ==
=== 2014:The Voice Kids breakthrough ===
Labajo performed his own rendition of Adam Sandler's song, "Grow Old With You", for ABS-CBN's The Voice Kids season 1 blind auditions, which was broadcast on June 7, 2014. Coaches Sarah Geronimo and Bamboo Mañalac both pressed their buttons to choose him for their teams. Geronimo praised his storytelling. The double selection gave Labajo the choice of coaches. Although Geronimo invited him to be a guest star at her upcoming concert, he picked Mañalac. His new coach called him "the funniest kid I have ever met".

Labajo advanced to the four-person finals after singing "Sway" during the live semi-finals held at the Newport Performing Arts Theater in Resorts World Manila. From the public votes, he received the third-highest total of the semi-finalists, after Lyca Gairanod and Darren Espanto. During the first and second rounds of the finals, Labajo performed "Yesterday" and "Runaway Baby" by The Beatles and Bruno Mars respectively. Coach Lea Salonga said, "You have the looks, the charm, and the heart. With those three, you're guaranteed a future in this business." Mañalac gave him a similar comment: "I see a singer, an artist, and possibly an actor. I see someone who has the charisma to do it all." For the final round in the finals, Labajo sang a duet with Gary Valenciano, the upbeat song "Eto Na Naman". At the end of the competition, he once again came in third from the voting.

The Voice Kids Philippines season 1 performances and results
Week	Theme	Song	Original artist	Date	Result
Blind Audition	—N/a	"Grow Old With You"	Adam Sandler	June 7, 2014	Sarah and Bamboo turned Joined Team Bamboo's Kamp Kawayan
Battle Rounds	—N/a	"A Thousand Years" (vs. Julienne Echavez vs. Maite Zubiri)	Christina Perri	July 5, 2014	Saved by coach
Sing-offs	—N/a	"Stay"	Rihanna	July 6, 2014	Saved by coach
Semi-finals	—N/a	"Sway"	Dean Martin	July 19, 2014	Saved by public votes (third highest vote total)
Finals	Round One: Power Ballad	"Yesterday"	The Beatles	July 26, 2014	2nd runner-up
Finals	Round Two: Upbeat	"Runaway Baby"	Bruno Mars	July 26, 2014	2nd runner-up
Finals	Round Three: Duet with a celebrity	"Eto Na Naman" (with Gary Valenciano)	Gary Valenciano	July 27, 2014	2nd runner-up

After the season of The Voice Kids Philippines Labajo, along with his other three co-finalists in The Voice Kids, officially became a part of Star Magic, ABS-CBN's training and management center.

Labajo's first project as part of Star Magic was in ABS-CBN's family drama series Hawak-Kamay. A preview on August 15, 2014, showed him with the show's cast. His fellow The Voice Kids finalist, Lyca Gairanod, joined him in the cast on August 22. He has also appeared in the drama anthology series Maalaala Mo Kaya playing himself for his own life story.

=== 2015: Pangako Sa 'Yo and debut album ===
To continue Labajo's acting career he played as Nico in ABS-CBN's TV Series Ipaglaban Mo: Sa Dulo ng Daan episode last May 9, 2015. Labajo was also cast in "Pangako Sa 'Yo" and plays the role of "Amboy Mobido", one of friends of Yna (Kathryn Bernardo) and is the brother of "Egoy"/Jonathan Mobido (Grae Fernandez).

In August 2015, Labajo released his debut album, "JK". It has a total of 8 songs, including a special band version of "Para Sa 'Yo," and an acoustic version of "This Gravity". "Di Ka Man Lang Nagpaalam" is a special song on the album, because JK dedicates it to his late mother.

In October, he was the MYX Celebrity VJ for the month of October, which was his first time.

=== 2016: We Love OPM: The Celebrity Sing-Offs and Pinoy Big Brother: Lucky 7 ===
In May 2016, Labajo was one of the contestants in the Filipino reality music competition show We Love OPM The Celebrity Sing-Offs on ABS-CBN which was aired from May 14, 2016, to July 17, 2016. His other co-teammates were The Voice Kids Season 2 Finalist Kyle Echarri and PBB 737 Teens' Finalist Bailey May. Their CelebriTeam's name was supposedly "Poon and Fork", Labajo jokingly suggested to their mentor Richard Poon, but Poon declined Labajo's witty suggestion. And so, the three decided that their CelebriTeam's name would be Voice Next Door. They performed the songs Sa Kanya popularized by Martin Nievera, Pangarap na Bituin by Sharon Cuneta, Lalake by Hagibis, Paano by Gary Valenciano, Kung Tayo'y Magkakalayo by Rey Valera with the Oh My Girls CelebriTeam which consists of Alexa Ilacad, Ylona Garcia, and Krissha Viaje, Macho Gwapito by Rico J. Puno, Sayang na Sayang by Aegis, Wag Kang Pabebe by Vice Ganda, and Blue Jeans by APO Hiking Society.

Labajo wasn't present in some episodes due to fever or for having another schedule during the taping of those episodes. From week nine of the show until the semi-finals, Labajo was permanently absent due to his competition in Pinoy Big Brother: Lucky 7 in Vietnam and in the Philippines. And so his co-teammates Kyle Echarri and Bailey May were the only ones left in the group. The Voice Next Door was eliminated in the Semi-finals of the show.

After, Labajo with Andrea Brillantes and the other Kapamilya Teen Stars' production in ASAP last July 3, 2016, Robi Domingo and Toni Gonzaga announced that he will be joining the new Pinoy Big Brother: Lucky 7. Labajo shared some of his expectations and said that he is excited to be part of the reality show. On "Day 0", he, Yassi Pressman, Jinri Park, McCoy de Leon, and Nikko Natividad were introduced as the first five celebrity housemates. They were flown from Manila to Vietnam becoming the show's first time out of the country experience. Although, Jinri, JK, and Hideo were the only ones left due to their visa and immigration conflict.

On "Day 2", the three were finally able to arrive in Vietnam after the immigration and visa issue. In that morning, they were chained and blindfolded inside the living room in the Big Brother Vietnam House, making the housemates to unchain them within 30 minutes. Luckily, they were successful with their task.

On "Day 19", Labajo came back to the PBB House, since the girl housemates were able to guess him while they were blindfolded.

During their second Lucky Task which was to come up with a water puppet show, Labajo suggested something but Nonong and Chacha didn't approve to his suggestion, making him feel ignored. Labajo later on went to the confession room to have some advice from Kuya. He cried for a little inside the confession room because he felt like he didn't have any worth since he was the youngest among the celebrity housemates. Kuya told him to be more open to his housemates since they were his second family. Nonong and Chacha suspected that he wasn't feeling okay, and so they asked him what was wrong. Labajo didn't say anything about it and both Nonong and Chacha gave him the offer to control the puppets, but he refused and stuck with playing the guitar for the music of their water puppet show. After their successful task, the three of them talked again until Labajo admitted that he was feeling ignored with his suggestions by them. Also, he followed Kuya's advice to be open to them.

On July 15's episode of the show, Kuya asked Labajo in the confession room about his personal life. He then shared about his past in Cebu, how hard it was for him and how he felt about it. After Kuya asking him about his mother, he teared up and told Kuya how regretful he was because he wasn't able to spend much time with his mother like how others kids do with theirs. He also shared that he was present during his mother's death. Kuya told him that his mother is very proud of him, regardless of wherever she is. Kuya also told him that he has come far from where he was, and that he will experience more as he grows older so that he should live his life as a child since he still is.

During the celebrity housemates' Big Jump Challenge, Labajo's helper for that challenge was his younger half-brother Louie Stephan Labajo, who made him shock when he first saw him after many months. After the Big Jump Challenge, Labajo was in the confession room. Kuya asked how his relationship with his brother was, and he told him that it was a neighborly type. He admitted that he was jealous of his mother's second family since his mother spent more of her time with her family rather than with him. He also mentioned that he and his two younger half-brothers weren't close, making him say that he always wanted a sibling. Although mentioned earlier, he wasn't close with them. He cried but Kuya told him that he's still young and he has the ability to spend his time with his brothers because dreams can be reached.

Labajo was unable to pass the Big Jump Challenge, making him be evicted along with Nonong, Elisse, Yassi, and Hideo on Day 23. Moreover, on Day 32 which was the PBB: Lucky 7 Teen Edition, he guested during the SwerTeen Ball, surprising Vivoree Esclito, one of the housemates who didn't have a partner that time. He was asked by Kuya to play Vivoree's own song composition, which he did.

=== 2017: A Love to Last, sophomore album, and film debut ===
Labajo served as the MYX Celebrity VJ for the month of January 2017, his second time wherein his first was last October 2015. On January 9, 2017, ABS-CBN's A Love to Last premiered nationwide on television, making his first appearance on the first episode playing the role of Lucas Noble, the son of Anton Noble IV and Grace Silverio-Noble. On January 16, MCA Music announced on their social media accounts that his first ever major solo concert and birthday concert entitled, "JKL Live" was "postponed indefinitely due to unforeseen circumstances." Last February 6, 2017, Labajo's second album entitled, "JKL", was released in selected Astroplus and Astrovision stores. His album consists of 8 tracks with his 3 own compositions entitled, "Demonyo", "Forever" a wedding song, and "Move On" which he composed when he was still in PBB. It also comes up with an EDM-like version.

Later that year, Labajo made his first movie appearance as part of Joven Tan's indie film Tatlong Bibe.

=== 2018–present: Juan Karlos ===
In 2018, JK revealed that he is forming a band named after him. He released one of his most popular songs, "Buwan" (moon in English) in June 2018.

In January 2024, Labajo and fellow actor-singer Kyle Echarri released "Kasing Kasing" (lit. 'Heart'), a Visayan pop ballad that is fully in Cebuano. Labajo and Echarri initially planned to write the song in Tagalog, but decided to write it in Cebuano, their native language, instead. They shared that they felt Cebuano music lacked representation in the Philippines' mainstream music industry. In an interview, Echarri said, "We wanted to show how Bisaya people are with our language with how we express our emotions[...]," adding that the two hoped to normalize using Cebuano in songs. In July, Labajo announced an end to what he called his phase of producing "sad boy music" through the release of his album Sad Songs and Bulls**t Part 2. In October, Labajo remembered his grandmother Linda in launching “Juan Karlos LIVE” set for November 29 in SM Mall of Asia Arena. His first major concert is directed by Paolo Valenciano, produced by Nathan Studios with Universal Music Group Philippines support.

=== Influences ===
Labajo stated that he wanted to have a career in the entertainment industry since he was very young because he wanted to leave a mark in the world. He was also influenced by his late mother, who hoped he would win a television singing contest. Recently, he's been sharing both in interviews and social media that some of his inspirations in his career are Daniel Day-Lewis, Joel Torre, and some other known jazz artists like Django Reinhardt and Bill Evans. He is also an aspiring photographer.

== Personal life ==
In April 2020, Labajo announced through Instagram that he was searching for his German father, posting an old photo of the latter. A few days later, he shared that he found his father's WhatsApp account and sent messages, but his father blocked him. Labajo then announced "This concludes the end of my search. His bio says, 'Life is beautiful.' I guess he has a family now and he definitely doesn't want me to be part of it. Thank you to everyone who gave their time and efforts in helping me. I appreciate it."

Labajo dated Filipino-German model Maureen Wroblewitz from 2017 to 2022. She appeared in the music video for Juan Karlos's 2018 single "Buwan".

As of February 2024, Labajo is dating beauty queen and musician Dia Maté.

=== Controversy ===
In October 2018, Labajo engaged in a public feud with his The Voice Kids batchmate Darren Espanto, wherein the two singers exchanged homophobic slurs on Twitter. In deleted tweets, Labajo addressed Espanto: "you turned your back on your own friend because of what people around you are saying." He then apologized for explaining himself "out of anger" but denied posting the initial tweet referring to Espanto with a homophobic slur. In March 2019, Espanto's parents filed a cyberlibel case against Labajo for "a malicious comment about [Espanto's] gender." In a 2020 interview, Espanto recalled the feud: "We were like best friends when we were in The Voice. Then, a lot of people started telling me things that they claimed he said about me ... I don't really know where those things came from and why he started doing it." He then claimed that the feud was "not something to dwell on anymore". In an October 2024 press conference, Labajo claimed that the lawsuit against him was dismissed. Recalling the feud, Labajo said "a lot of things are definitely blown out of proportion." While refusing to discuss his relationship with Espanto, he stated that he has "always been open ... from my end" to do a musical collaboration with any musician, including Espanto.

== Acting credits ==
=== Film ===
Key
†	Denotes films that have not yet been released

Juan Karlos Labajo's film credits with year of release, film titles and roles
Year	Title	Role	Ref.
2017	Tatlong Bibe	James	
2022	Blue Room	Anton	
2023	Ako si Ninoy	Benigno Aquino Jr.	
2023	When This Is All Over	The Guy	
2024	Lolo and the Kid	Adult Kid	
2025	Ex Ex Lovers	Joey	
2025	Untold	Jasper Torres	
2025	Meet, Greet & Bye	Leo Facundo	
2025	Sana Sinabi Mo		
2026	Mono No Aware †		

=== Television ===
Key
†	Denotes shows that have not yet been aired

Juan Karlos Labajo's television credits with year of release, title(s) and role
Year	Title	Role	Ref.
2014	Maalaala Mo Kaya: Picture	Himself	
2014	Hawak-Kamay	Charles Kenneth "CK" Rodriguez	
2015	Ipaglaban Mo: Sa Dulo ng Daan	Nico	
2015–2016	Pangako Sa 'Yo	Vincent "Amboy" Mobido	
2017	A Love to Last	Lucas Noble	
2017	Ipaglaban Mo: Pikon	Lemuel Velasco	
2023–2024	Senior High	Gino Acosta	
2024	High Street	Gino Acosta	

== Discography ==
=== Studio albums ===
List of studio albums, with selected details and certifications
Title	Album details	Certifications
JK	Released: July 3, 2015; Label: MCA Music; Formats: CD, digital download, streaming	PARI: Gold
JKL	Released: January 27, 2017; Label: MCA Music; Formats: digital download, streaming	

=== Singles ===
==== As lead artist ====
List of singles as lead artist, showing year released, and associated albums
Title	Year	Album
"Runaway Baby"	2014	The Voice Kids (The Album) and JK
"Para Sa 'Yo"	2015	JK
"Di Ka Man Lang Nagpaalam"	2016	JK
"Summer Time Love"	2016	JK
"This Gravity"	2016	JK
"Sana Kung Pwede Lang"	2016	JKL

==== As featured artist ====
List of singles as featured artist, showing year released, and associated albums
Title	Year	Album
"Bwelo Lang" (Edray Teodoro featuring Juan Karlos Labajo)	2017	Edray

=== Other appearances ===
Title	Year	Album
"Lord Merry Christmas" (with various artists)	2014	My Christmas Album All Stars
"Hark the Herald Angels Sing"	2014	My Christmas Album All Stars
"Thank You, Ang Babait Ninyo" (with Lyca Gairanod, Darren Espanto, and Darlene Vibares)	2014	My Christmas Album All Stars
"Beautiful Girl"	2017	A Love to Last (The Official Soundtrack)
"Leni Laban!" (with various artists)	2022	Non-album single

== Concert ==
Year	Title	Details	Notes	Ref.
2014	Boses ng Bulilit... Kami Ulit!	Date: July 31, Thursday; Venue: Resorts World Manila; Studio: ABS-CBN	The Voice Kids PH	
2014	The Voice Kids ALL IN: THE CONCERT	Date: December 6, Saturday; Venue: PICC Plenary Hall; Studio: MCA Music Inc.	The Voice Kids PH	
2015	Juan Karlos: A Birthday Show	Date: February 20, 2015 Friday; Venue: Teatrino Promenade, Greenhills; Studio: MCA Music Inc.; Juan Karlos United Families Club	SOLD OUT	
2015	Ang Tinig Natin: The Ultimate Kapamilya Song Hits	Date: March 5, 2015 Sunday; Venue: Resorts World Manila; Studio: ABS-CBN	With Other Kapamilya Stars	
2015	Teen Power: The Kabataang Pinoy Concert	Date: August 8, 2015 Saturday; Venue: Aliw Theater; Studio: ABS-CBN	With Other Kapamilya Teen Stars	
2016	ONE Voice Concert	Date: October 1, 2016 Saturday; Venue: Music Museum, Greenhills; Studio: MCA Music Inc.	With Jason Dy and Klarisse De Guzman	
2016	Hi! Music Singtel Concert	Date: December 4, 2016 Sunday; Venue: Republic Avenue, Nicoll Highway MRT, Singapore; Studio: Singtel	OFW Prepaid Concert	
2016	The Hit Parade Canada Tour 2016	Date: October 28, 2016 Friday; Venue: Massey Theatre, Vancouver, Canada; Studio: ABS-CBN	With Elha Nympha, KZ Tandingan, Kean Cipriano, Viveika Ravanes	
2017	JKL Live	Date: February 5, 2017; Venue: Kia Theatre; Studio: MCA Music Inc.	POSTPONED (CANCELLED)	
2017	Love Goals: A Love to Last Concert	Date: September 8, 2017; Venue: Kia Theatre; Studio: ABS-CBN	With Other A Love to Last actors	
2024	juan karlos live	November 29, 2024 MOA Arena Nathan Studios	First Major Solo Concert	

== Awards and nominations ==
Year	Organization	Category	Nominated work	Result	Ref.
2014	28th PMPC Star Awards for Television	Best New Male TV Personality	Maalaala Mo Kaya: Picture	Nominated	
2015	2nd Star Cinema Online Awards	Most Promising TV Star	Pangako Sa 'Yo	Nominated	
2015	1st RAWR Awards	Performer/Artist of the Year (Male)	—N/a	Nominated	
2016	1st Wish Music Awards	Best Wishclusive Performance by a Young Artist	"Photograph"	Nominated	
2016	1st Wish Music Awards	Wish Ballad Song of the Year	"Para Sa 'Yo"	Nominated	
2016	1st Wish Music Awards	Wish Original Song of the Year	"Para Sa 'Yo"	Nominated	
2016	1st Wish Music Awards	Wish Young Artist of the Year	—N/a	Nominated	
2016	11th Myx Music Awards	Favorite Male Artist	—N/a	Nominated	
2016	11th Myx Music Awards	Favorite Mellow Video	"Para Sa 'Yo"	Nominated	
2016	11th Myx Music Awards	Favorite MYX Celebrity VJ	—N/a	Nominated	
2016	29th Awit Awards	Best Performance by a New Male Recording Artist	"Para Sa'Yo"	Nominated	
2016	29th Awit Awards	Best Musical Arrangement	"Para Sa'Yo"	Nominated	
2017	2nd Wish Music Awards	Best Wishclusive Performance by a Young Artist	"Starving"	Nominated	
2017	2nd Wish Music Awards	Wish Young Artist of the Year	—N/a	Nominated	
2017	12th Myx Music Awards	Favorite Mellow Video	"Di Ka Man Lang Nagpaalam"	Won	
2017	4th MPS Online Awards	Favorite Male OPM Artist	—N/a	Nominated	
2017	4th MPS Online Awards	Favorite Mellow Song	"Di Ka Man Lang Nagpaalam"	Nominated	
2017	4th MPS Online Awards	Favorite Chart-Topper Song	"Di Ka Man Lang Nagpaalam"	Nominated	
2017	7th EdukCircle Awards	Best Supporting Actor in a Television Series	A Love to Last	Nominated	
2017	30th Awit Awards	Best Pop Recording	"Sana Kung Pwede Lang"	Nominated	
2018	13th Myx Music Awards	MYX Celebrity VJ of the Year	—N/a	Nominated	
2018	5th MOR Pinoy Music Awards	Album of the Year	JKL	Won	
2018	5th MOR Pinoy Music Awards	OPM Revival of the Year	"Beautiful Girl"	Won	
2018	10th PMPC Star Awards for Music	Male Pop Artist of the Year	"Demonyo"	Nominated	
2018	31st Awit Awards	Best Pop Recording	"Demonyo"	Nominated	
2018	31st Awit Awards	Best Rock/Alternative Recording	"Demonyo"	Nominated	
2019	32nd Awit Awards	Best Performance by a Male Recording Artist	"Buwan"	Won	
2019	32nd Awit Awards	People's Voice Favorite Male Artist	—N/a	Won	
2019	5th Alta Media Icon Awards	Best Male Recording Artist	"Buwan"	Won	
2020	11th PMPC Star Awards for Music	Male Recording Artist of the Year	"Buwan"	Nominated	
2022	13th PMPC Star Awards for Music	All-Around Artist & Frontman Recognition Award	—N/a	Won	
2023	3rd Pinoy Rebyu Awards	Best Supporting Performance	Blue Room	Nominated	
2023	3rd Pinoy Rebyu Awards	Best Ensemble Performance (Note: Shared with the cast of Blue Room.)	Blue Room	Nominated	
2023	6th Entertainment Editor's Choice Awards	Best Theme Song (Note: Shared with various artists.)	"Pag-ibig na Sumpa"	Nominated	
2023	46th Gawad Urian Awards	Best Actor in a Supporting Role	Blue Room	Nominated	
