= Mono No Aware (film) =

2026 drama film by BC Amparado

- Theatrical poster
- Directed by: BC Amparado
- Written by: BC Amparado
- Produced by: Chris Cahilig; Ferdinand Lapuz; Ivy Zharisse Piedad; Jaime G. Baltazar; Tin Velasco
- Starring: Juan Karlos Labajo; Perry Dizon; Momoko Kobayashi
- Cinematography: Timothy M. Malones
- Edited by: Edmund M. Telmo
- Music by: Willie Apa Jr.
- Production companies: Cine Canawili; Ihr HERz
- Release date: 23 September 2026
- Country: Philippines
- Languages: Filipino; Cebuano; Japanese

Mono No Aware (Japanese: 物の哀れ, Hepburn: Mono no aware) is a 2026 Philippine drama film written and directed by BC Amparado. Starring Filipino actors Juan Karlos Labajo and Perry Dizon, and Japanese actress Momoko Kobayashi, the story follows a Filipino kodokushi cleaner who encounters an elderly widower who asks him to fulfill one last request before he dies.

A co-production of Cine Canawili Productions and Ihr HERz, the film was theatrically released in the Philippines on 23 September 2026, as one of the official entries to the 3rd Puregold CinePanalo Film Festival.

== Plot ==
Ichi, a young Filipino man, works as a kodokushi cleaner, who is responsible for cleaning and restoring homes after occupants have died alone. One day, he meets a lonely elderly compatriot, George, who asks him to fulfill his final request before he passes away.

== Cast ==
- Juan Karlos Labajo as Ichi: A young man from Cebu who is employed as a kodokushi cleaner.
- Perry Dizon as George: An elderly man, hailing from Davao, who lives alone after his Japanese wife died.
- Momoko Kobayashi as Mori: A volunteer from a local welfare office.
- Kouichi Hanagasaki as Kaito: A bar owner and George's friend.
- Paolo O'Hara
- Kentarou Furuyama
- Aika Higashimori
- Kaname Nagamori
- Tadashi Watanabe

== Production ==
Mono No Aware was originally envisioned in 2020 by filmmaker BC Amparado as his feature film debut; however, although it is set in Japan, securing an international co-producer for this matter was considered "impossible". He subsequently refined it in an online screenwriting workshop conducted by screenwriter Ricky Lee, where his classmate showed interest in the material, offering to acquire and develop it for a different director, but ultimately failed, and it was put on hold until he began working with actor Perry Dizon via Gulay Lang, Manong.

The film is inspired by Amparado's experiences and memories with his uncle, who worked as an OFW in Japan. These experiences led him to "explore the emotions of grief and loneliness and isolation" after he was sparked an interest in the country and the concept of mono no aware. Apart from his uncle, he also cited films including Wim Wenders' Perfect Days and Hirokazu Kore-eda's Shoplifters as another inspirations.

=== Casting ===
While making Gulay Lang, Manong, Amparado approached actor Perry Dizon, whom he believed was the perfect actor to play George, citing his long hair and apparent reserved appearance at that time and his appearance in Ryusuke Hamaguchi's Drive My Car in 2021. Juan Karlos Labajo was cast as Ichi and began preparing by gaining weight and learning Japanese with the help of a language coach. Additionally, he also served as co-producer, and his professional fee was waived and instead allocated to essential expenses, including airfare, accommodation, and film equipment.

== Reception ==
=== Critical response ===
Fred Hawson, writing for ABS-CBN News and Current Affairs, gave a positive review, praising its technical aspects that depict a challenging tale with a "simple, orderly, and understated yet emotionally refined" Japanese aesthetic; the lead actors' exceptional performances that made a profound emotional resonance with the story; and lastly, its impact as a thought-provoking, poignant, and masterfully crafted cinematic work while dealing with the challenges of lonely death and grief.

Nazamel Tabares, writing for Pelikula Mania, gave the film 4.5 out of 5 stars. She called the film "a refreshing entry in Philippine cinema" and "a thoughtful, honest movie", favorably likening it to the films directed by Hirokazu Kore-eda and Ryusuke Hamaguchi, whose typical themes in their respective works can resonate with the Philippine audience. She also praised the lead actors' performances, along with the film's immersive direction and thematic richness.

Jap Tobias, writing for Interaksyon, gave a mixed review, commending the performances of the lead actors, the emotional impact, and the thematic richness, but criticized its 129-minute runtime and described it as "a test of patience". Brontë H. Lacsamana, writing for BusinessWorld, gave a mixed-to-positive review, with praise towards its strong premise, naturally delivered acting performances, and the technical aspects surrounding Japan, although she encountered two problems: its slow pace and the lack of story depth.

=== Accolades ===
Award-giving organization/Festival	Date of ceremony	Category	Recipient(s)	Result	Ref.
3rd Puregold Cinepanalo Film Festival	30 September 2026	Best Full-Length Film	Mono No Aware	Won	
3rd Puregold Cinepanalo Film Festival	30 September 2026	Best Director	BC Amparado	Won	
3rd Puregold Cinepanalo Film Festival	30 September 2026	Best Actor	Juan Karlos Labajo	Won	
3rd Puregold Cinepanalo Film Festival	30 September 2026	Best Supporting Actress	Momoko Kobayashi	Won	
3rd Puregold Cinepanalo Film Festival	30 September 2026	Best Ensemble	Mono No Aware	Won	
3rd Puregold Cinepanalo Film Festival	30 September 2026	Best Cinematography	Timothy Malones	Won	
3rd Puregold Cinepanalo Film Festival	30 September 2026	Best Editing	Edmund Telmo	Won	
3rd Puregold Cinepanalo Film Festival	30 September 2026	Best Sound Design	Willie Apa Jr.	Won	
3rd Puregold Cinepanalo Film Festival	30 September 2026	International Jury Award	Mono No Aware	Won	
