= Darren (album) =

Studio album by Darren Espanto
- Released: December 10, 2014 (Philippines)
- Recorded: 2014
- Genre: Teen pop, electropop, R&B, OPM
- Length: 33:17
- Label: MCA Music Inc.
- Producer: Ricky R. Ilacad (exec.), Keith Martin, Francis Guevarra, Vehnee Saturno, Lucas Rezza and Adrian Rezza

Darren Espanto chronology
Darren (2014)	Be with Me (2016)

Singles from Darren
- 1. "In Love Ako Sayo" Released: November 14, 2014; 2. "Stuck" Released: May 11, 2015; 3. "Makin' Moves" Released: December 25, 2015

Darren is the first studio album by Filipino-Canadian singer Darren Espanto. It was released on December 10, 2014, under MCA Music Inc. It is the most expensive studio album by a Filipino artist.

Espanto had a press conference on February 17, 2015, to officially launch his debut album. The album, immediately upon release in the Philippines, debuted at number-one on the Apple's iTunes store and Astro Chart, making Darren the youngest artist in the Philippines to reach the top spot on the chart solo. As of August 2015, the album has sold 15,000+ units and is now a certified Platinum.

== Recording ==
For Darren, Espanto worked with local and international producers and most respected composers. The album features the carrier single “In Love Ako sa ’Yo,” (I'm in Love with You) a Vehnee Saturno composition. The latter contributed three more selections to the album – “My Girl,” “Ewan Ko,” (I Don't Know) and “Ah! Basta Gusto Kita.” (Whatever! That's Why I Like You)

Another local composer Kennard Faraon wrote “Stuck” for the album. The rest of the tracks in “Darren” were penned by foreign composers – Keith Martin and Deon Hairston for “You Are the Only One,” Adrian Rezza, Lucas Rezza and Carvin Winans for “I Believe in Me,” and Fil-Am Brad Go for “Makin’ Moves.” A bonus track in the album is the studio version of Jessie J's “Domino”, which Darren performed during The Voice Kids Philippines’ blind audition

== Promotion ==
Before the release of the album, Darren had a concert tour in the Philippines and abroad where he performed, "In Love Ako Sayo"(I'm In Love with you). He also performed Stuck and Ewan ko (I don't know) from his self-titled album during his album mall tour in Fisher Mall. A Grand Fans Day has been scheduled on December 21, 2014, at Robinsons Forum where the album will also be promoted. On February 17, 2015, Espanto had a press conference to officially launch his debut album.

== Singles ==
- "In Love Ako Sayo" (I'm in Love with You) is the carrier single of the album and premiered on radio stations nationwide on November 14, 2014. It was written by Vehnee Saturno

== Track listing ==
No.	Title	Writer(s)	Producer(s)	Length
1.	"In Love Ako Sa 'Yo"	Vehnee Saturno	Vehnee Saturno	3:53
2.	"Stuck"	Kennard Faraon	Francis Guevarra	4:43
3.	"My Girl"	Vehnee Saturno	Vehnee Saturno	3:36
4.	"You Are the Only One"	Keith Martin, Deon Hairston	Keith Martin, Francis Guevarra	3:32
5.	"Ewan Ko"	Vehnee Saturno	Vehnee Saturno	3:34
6.	"Makin' Moves"	Brad Go	Francis Guevarra	4:03
7.	"Ah! Basta Gusto Kita"	Vehnee Saturno	Vehnee Saturno	3:35
8.	"I Believe In Me"	Lucas And Adrian Rezza, Carvin Winans	Lucas And Adrian Rezza	4:25
Total length:				31:21

Bonus tracks (deluxe edition)
No.	Title	Writer(s)	Producer(s)	Length
9.	"Domino" (Original artist: Jessie J)	Claude Kelly, Henry Walter, Jessica Cornish, Lukasz Gottwald, Max Martin	Francis Guevarra, Jr.	3:58
10.	"I Believe" (Original artist: Fantasia)	Louis Biancaniello, Tamyra Gray, Sam Watters	Francis Guevarra, Jr.	5:34
11.	"Stuck (Remix)"	Kennard Faraon	Francis Guevarra; Remixed by Bimbo Yance	4:22
Total length:				45:10

== Certifications ==
Country	Provider	Certification	Sales
Philippines	PARI	Double Platinum	(30,000+ copies)

== Release history ==
Country	Date	Label	Formats
Worldwide	December 6, 2014	MCA Music Inc.	digital download
Philippines	December 10, 2014	MCA Music Inc.	CD
