= Lyca Gairanod =

Filipino singer and actress (born 2004)

- Born: Lyca Jane Epe Gairanod; November 21, 2004 (age 21); Tanza, Cavite, Philippines
- Musical career
- Genres: OPM, pinoy rock, pop rock, folk rock, pop, RnB, soul music, adult contemporary
- Occupations: Singer, actress, vlogger
- Instrument: Vocal
- Years active: 2014–present
- Labels: Star Magic (2014–2020); UMG Philippines (2014–present); Viva Artists Agency (since 2020)

YouTube information
- Channel: Lyca Gairanod
- Years active: 2015–2023
- Genres: Vlogging, singing
- Subscribers: 2.06 million
- Views: 100K
- Last updated: December 8, 2024
- Website: Lyca Gairanod on Facebook; Lyca Gairanod on Instagram; Lyca Gairanod on X

Lyca Jane Epe Gairanod (born November 21, 2004) is a Filipino singer and actress. She won the first season of The Voice Kids Philippines, where she was hailed as “The New Generation Superstar” and landed a recording contract with UMG Philippines She subsequently made her first television appearance as an actress portraying herself in ABS-CBN's Maalaala Mo Kaya and guested in ABS-CBN's Hawak-Kamay the following month.

== Early life ==
Gairanod was born on November 21, 2004, in Tanza, Cavite, Philippines. Her family collected plastic materials, bottles, and other recyclable items for added income. Her father is a fisherman, and her mother, Maria Nessel Gairanod, scavenged used bottles and old newspapers. Gairanod helped her mother and sang for her neighbors in exchange for money and food. Gairanod said she was not forced by her mother to find recyclable materials but wanted to help her family and earn an allowance.

== The Voice Kids' stint and championship ==
During ABS-CBN's The Voice Kids season one auditions, which aired on May 8, 2014, Gairanod performed Aegis' "Halik". Coach Sarah Geronimo pressed the button for her. Coach Lea Salonga was supposed to press her button but did not because she felt that the two were "meant to be".

She advanced to the sing-off round by winning the battles round on July 12, 2014, against Isaac Zamudio and Lee Marcelino. They sang "Isang Lahi" by Regine Velasquez.

The battles round was followed by the sing-offs. Per team, two artists are chosen by their coaches for the live shows. Unlike in the battles where the coach picks the song for the artists, in the sing-offs, the song is chosen by the artists.

She advanced to the semi-finals after being chosen by Sarah Geronimo as one of the two would-be representatives of team Sarah among five contenders, performing the Tagalog version of Luther Vandross' "Dance with My Father".

She advanced to the finals after singing "Pangarap na Bituin" by her mentor Sarah Geronimo during the live semi-finals on July 19, 2014, in Newport Performing Arts Theater, Resorts World Manila, Pasay. She received the highest number of votes. While Salonga stated that the song is usually sung by persons who have dreams to fulfill, Geronimo said that the child is slowly reaching her dream, and that she could help her family escape from poverty.

The voting mechanics for the live finals is based on the accumulated votes per round: power ballad round, upbeat song round, and a duet with a celebrity round. Voting lines are opened between the end and the start of each round. At the end of the three rounds, all votes are tallied and the artist who gains the highest accumulated votes is declared the winner.

The first episode of the finals was opened by the top four artists with a medley rendition of Sponge Cola's "Bitiw", Rocksteddy's "Superhero", and Sandwich's "Sugod".

Gairanod sang Regine Velasquez's "Narito Ako" on the first round of the finals. She also sang Carly Rae Jepsen's "Call Me Maybe" on the second round and Aegis' "Basang-basa sa Ulan" on the third round. She was proclaimed the winner at the end of the competition.

=== Performances ===
Stage	Song	Original artist	Date	Order	Result
Blind Audition	"Halik"	Aegis	May 25, 2014	2.4	1 chair turned (Default to Team Sarah Geronimo)
Battle Rounds	"Isang Lahi" (vs. Isaac Zamudio vs. Lee Marcelino)	Regine Velasquez	July 12, 2014	15.4	Saved by Sarah
Sing-offs	"Dance with My Father" (Tagalog version)	Luther Vandross	July 13, 2014	16.6	Saved by Sarah
Live (Semi-finals)	"Pangarap na Bituin"	Sharon Cuneta	July 20, 2014	18.5	Saved by Public Vote (Highest votes)
Live (Finals)	"Narito Ako"	Regine Velasquez	July 26, 2014	19.4	Winner
Live (Finals)	"Call Me Maybe"	Carly Rae Jepsen	July 26, 2014	19.6	Winner
Live (Finals)	"Basang-Basa sa Ulan" (with Aegis)	Aegis	July 27, 2014	20.4	Winner

== Career after The Voice Kids ==
=== TV guestings and appearances ===
After being the first grand champion of The Voice Kids season one, she had not attended the concert because the singer planned to expatriate in the United States. Only Darlene Vibares, Darren Espanto, and Juan Karlos Labajo attended the concert including the other finalists of the show. The concert was a charity event for the victims of Typhoon Glenda.

She appeared on Rated K with Darlene Vibares, where they shared how they fought poverty at an early age.

The four finalists of The Voice Kids, including Gairanod, Espanto, Vibares, and Labajo, appeared on ASAP 19. Gairanod sang "Halik".

=== Acting career ===
Gairanod started her acting career in the drama anthology show Maalaala Mo Kaya, where she portrayed as herself during her formative years as a junk scavenger and her subsequent musical career.

== Filmography ==
=== Television ===
Year	Title	Role	Notes	Ref.
2014	Hawak-Kamay	Lilet	Guest	
2014	Maalaala Mo Kaya: Red Envelope	Herself	Main	
2014	Goin' Bulilit	Herself	Guest	
2017	Your Face Sounds Familiar Kids	Celebrity Performer		
2022	Masked Singer Pilipinas	Peacock	Song title: Don't Let Me Down; eliminated	
2022	Lakwatsika		Guest	

=== Film ===
Year	Title	Role	Ref.
2017	Tatlong Bibe	Kimberly	
2023	Mary Cherry Chua	Faith	

=== Reality and variety shows ===
Year	Title	Notes	Ref.
2017	Your Face Sounds Familiar Kids (season 1)	Contestant / Performer / Herself	
2014–present	The Voice Kids	Contestant / Grand Champion	
2014–present	ASAP	Herself	
2014–present	It's Showtime	Guest with TVK Top 4	
2014–present	The Voice of the Philippines S2	Herself / Guest	

=== Talk shows ===
Year	Title	Notes	Ref.
2017	Gandang Gabi Vice	Herself / Guest with YFSF Kids Grand Finalists	
2014	Rated K	Herself / Guest with TVK Top 4	
2014	Kris TV	Herself / Guest with TVK Top 4	
2014	The Buzz	Herself / Guest with TVK Top 4	
2014	Gandang Gabi Vice	Herself / Guest with TVK Top 4	
2014	Umagang Kay Ganda	Herself / Guest with TVK Top 4	

== Discography ==
=== Album ===
Year	Album title	Artist	Recording Label	Certification	Ref.
2014	The Voice Kids Album	Lyca Gairanod and The Voice Kids Top 6	MCA Music Inc.	GOLD	
2015	Puede Nang Mangarap	Lyca Gairanod	MCA Music Inc.		

=== Singles ===
Title	Release date	Composer(s)	Album	Ref(s)
"Pangarap Na Bituin"	December 22, 2014	Willy Cruz	The Voice Kids: The Album	
"Puede Nang Mangarap"	June 19, 2015	Proceso Gideon H. Marcelo	Puede Nang Mangarap	
"Sa Isang Awit"	November 6, 2015	Andrei B. Panaligan	Puede Nang Mangarap	
"Miss Kita Kung Christmas"	November 20, 2015	Fe M. Ayala	My Christmas Album All Stars	
"Malalampasan"	April 8, 2016	Noel P. Mahinay	Puede Nang Mangarap	
"Tayo Ay Maglaro" (featuring. Reynan Del-Anay)	October 3, 2016	Mary Jane C. Mendoza	Puede Nang Mangarap	
"Pasko Sa Ating Bayan"	November 29, 2018	Jesusa Sonora Poe, Bernadette Guttierez	Non-album singles	
"Tuloy Parin ang Pasko" (with Katrina Velarde, Billy Crawford and Daryl Ong)	December 9, 2020	Louie Ocampo	Non-album singles	
"Akala Ko Ba"	June 9, 2021	Mark Atienza	Non-album singles	
"Malapit Na Akong Mahulog Sa Iyo"	October 9, 2021	Paul Hildawa	Panibugho (Original soundtrack from the Vivamax movie)	
"Sa Ating Dalawa" (with Aubrey Caraan)	September 22, 2022	Chandler Manzano	(Themesong from the TV Series "Kalye Kweens")	
"Nag-iisang Muli"	October 7, 2022	Gian Bernardino	Non-album singles	
"Isa Lang"	December 4, 2023	Arthur Nery, Dwight Ian Perez, Jean-Paul Verona	Non-album singles	

== Chart performance ==
Year	Title	Peak (Pinoy Myx Countdown)	Peak (Myx Hit Chart)	Album
2014	Pangarap Na Bituin	2	4	The Voice Kids: The Album
2015	Puede Nang Mangarap	2	2	Puede Nang Mangarap: Album
2016	Sa Isang Awit	3	3	Puede Nang Mangarap: Album
2016	Tayo Ay Maglaro (feat Reynan Dal-Anay)	5	11	Puede Nang Mangarap: Album

== Concert ==
Year	Title	Details	Notes	Ref.
2014	Boses ng Bulilit... Kami Ulit!	Date: July 31, Thursday; Venue: Resorts World Manila; Studio: ABS-CBN	The Voice Kids	
2014	Lani Misalucha's Concert, the Philippine Tour	Date: August 22, Friday; Venue: Waterfront Cebu City Hotel & Casino	Guest (with Darren Espanto)	
2014	Lani Misalucha's Concert, the Philippine Tour	Date: August 29, Friday; Venue: SMX Convention Center, Davao	Guest (with Darren Espanto)	
2014	The Voice Kids ALL IN: THE CONCERT	Date: December 6, Saturday; Venue: PICC Plenary Hall; Studio: MCA Music Inc.	The Voice Kids	
2015	Little Voices: Live In Australia	Date: March 27; Venue: Melbourne	Concert (with Darren Espanto)	

== Accolades ==
- This is a list of awards, recognitions, achievements and nominations received by Lyca Gairanod during her career.

Year	Award	Category	Notable Works	Result	Ref.
2014	28th PMPC Star Awards for TV	Best New Female TV Personality	MMK: Red Envelope	Won	
2015	Myx Music Awards 2015	Favorite New Artist	The Voice Kids Album	Nominated	
2015	Myx Music Awards 2015	Favorite Remake	Pangarap na Bituin	Nominated	
2015	PEP List Awards 2015	Child Star of the Year	Herself	Won	
2015	28th Awit Awards	Best Performance by a Child/Children	Narito Ako	Won	

Awards and achievements
Preceded by Jason Dy	The Voice of the Philippines; Winner; 2014	Succeeded by Elha Nympha
First	The Voice of the Philippines Kids; Winner; 2014	Succeeded by Elha Nympha
