= The Voice Kids (Philippine TV series) season 1 =

The Voice Kids
- Season 1
- Hosted by: Luis Manzano
- Coaches: Lea Salonga; Bamboo Mañalac; Sarah Geronimo
- Winner: Lyca Gairanod
- Winning coach: Sarah Geronimo
- Runner-up: Darren Espanto
- Finals venue: Newport Performing Arts Theater, Resorts World Manila, Newport City, Pasay

Release
- Original network: ABS-CBN
- Original release: May 24 – July 27, 2014

Season chronology
- Next → Season 2

The first season of The Voice Kids was a Philippine reality singing competition on ABS-CBN. It was based on the Dutch reality competition of the same name. Lea Salonga, Sarah Geronimo, and Bamboo Mañalac who also sits as coaches in the adult version, are the coaches of the show. It was hosted by Luis Manzano, along with Alex Gonzaga as the show's backstage host. The show was set to premiere in April 2014, but was moved to May 24, 2014 until July 27, 2014, replacing the first season of Bet on Your Baby and was replaced by Mga Kwento Ni Marc Logan. It aired at 6:45 p.m. (PST) every Saturdays, and at 7:30 p.m. (PST) every Sundays.

== Development ==
On November 18, 2013, Lauren Dyogi, the franchise's business unit head, announced on Twitter that there will be a kids version of The Voice of the Philippines. The franchise was launched after the success of the first season of the main version which had garnered high ratings and was trending topic online. The audition dates were announced later in the month.

On March 9, 2014, the show released its first teaser. On March 17, 2014, the production team of the program started to provide updates of the filming of the Blind auditions, posting teasers of the new improved set and chairs and of the coaches in the show's official social media accounts. A second teaser was aired on April 2, 2014. Three teasers, one for each coach, were aired on April 17, 2014. In May, the show aired its first Blind audition teaser.

=== Coaches and host ===
The coaches of the first season of The Voice Kids

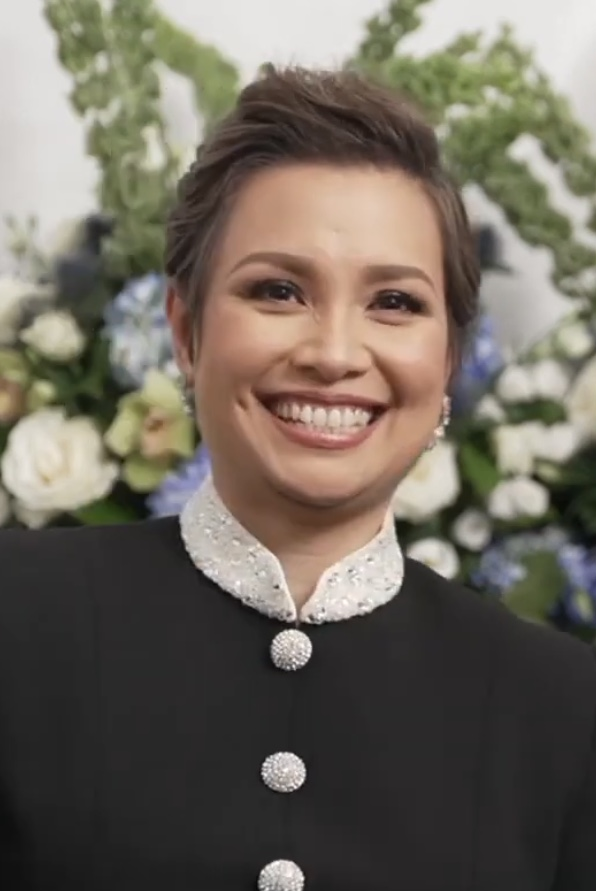
Lea Salonga

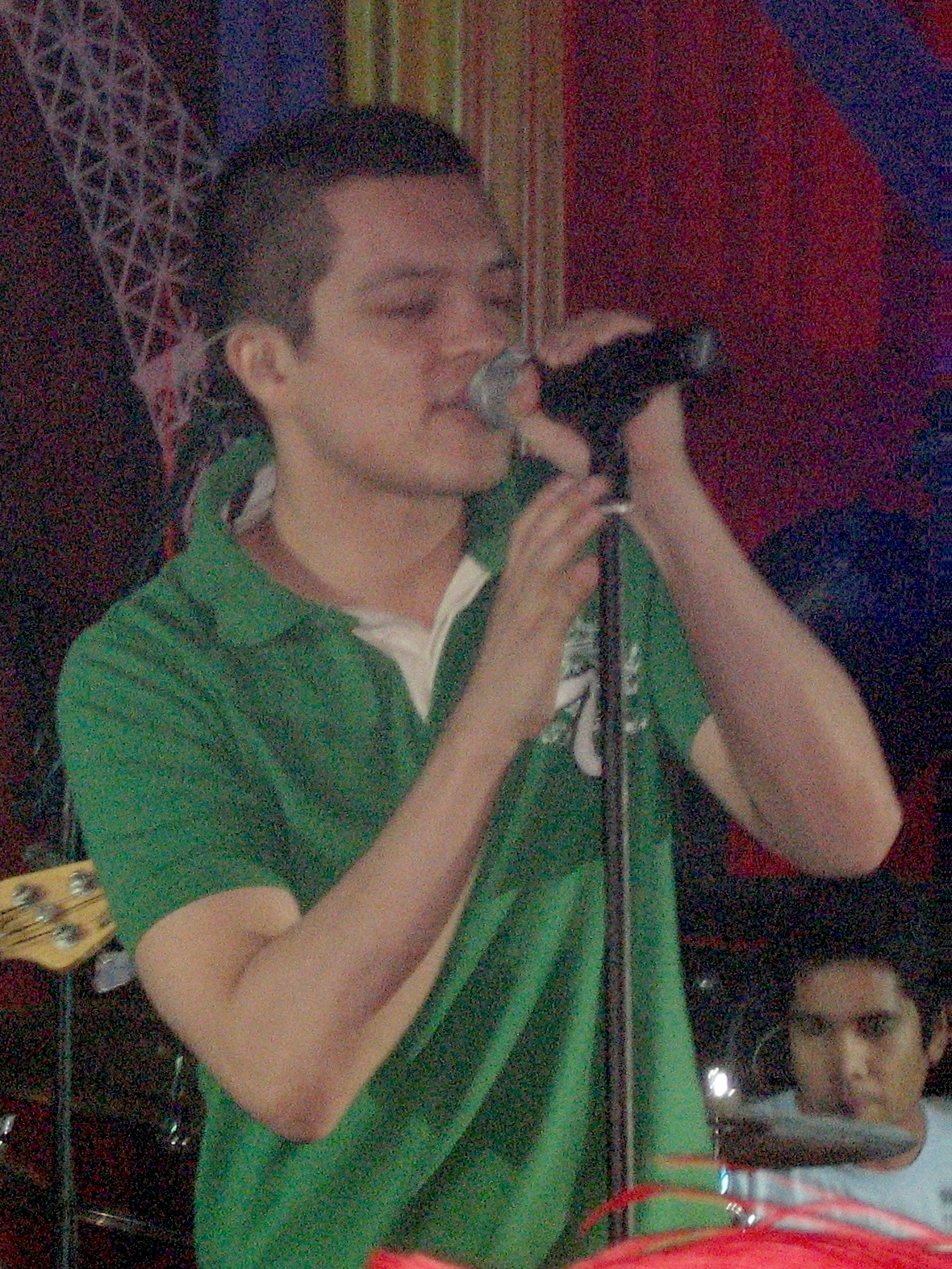
Bamboo Mañalac

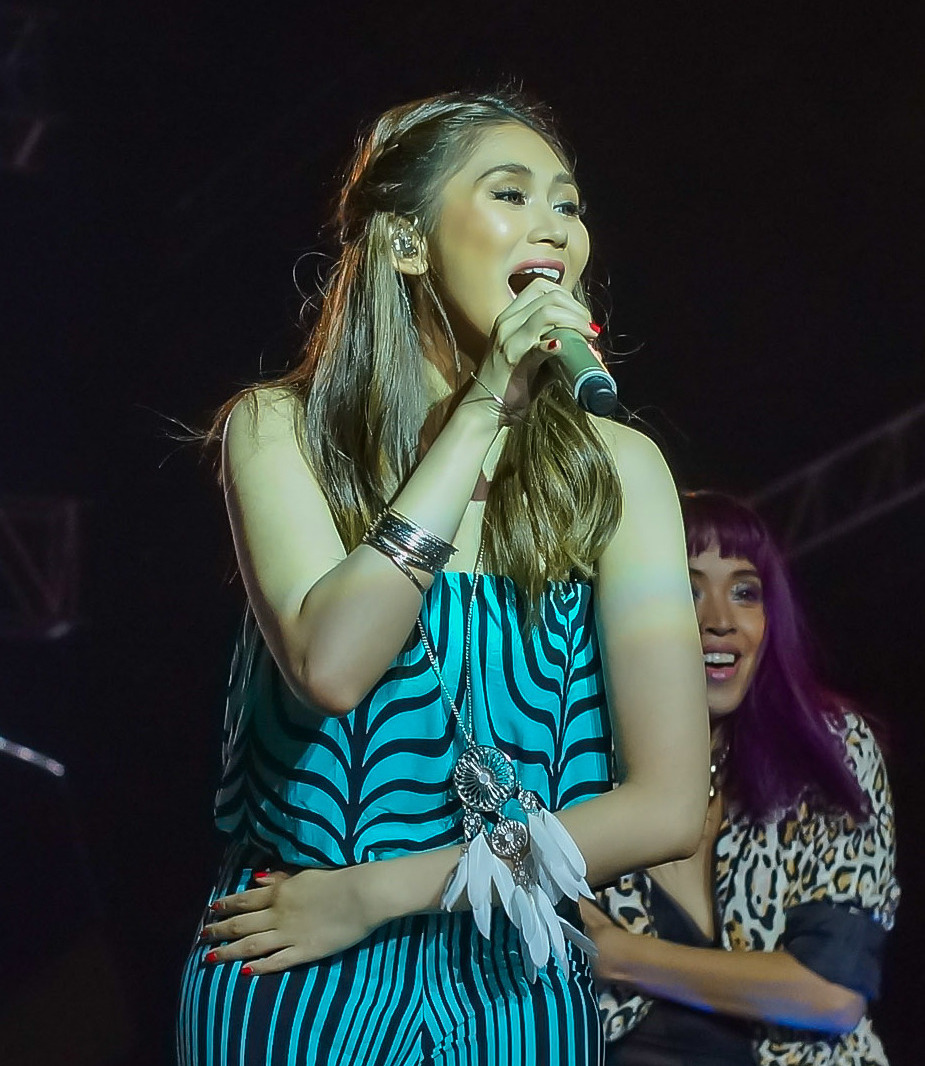
Sarah Geronimo

At first, there were rumors that an unnamed Filipino singer who is popular in Asia, and a Filipina singer who is known for winning an international reality singing competition will sit as coaches for this series. Later on the January 15, 2014 interview by Push, Lea Salonga confirmed that she will join as one of the coaches for the inaugural season of The Voice Kids. Salonga also confirmed that there will only be three coaches in this show, and coach apl.de.ap will not be part of this version. On March 7, 2014, Salonga confirmed on her Twitter that Sarah Geronimo and Bamboo Mañalac will be part of the kids version of the show.

On February 10, 2014 interview of Toni Gonzaga in Banana Nite, Toni Gonzaga confirmed that she will not be hosting the kids version. On March 11, 2014, a rumor was circulating online that Luis Manzano and Alex Gonzaga will be hosting the show. By March 14, the rumor was becoming stronger as The Voice Kids team published a teaser, through the franchise's official Instagram, of an image of two silhouette individuals described as the hosts of the show. Few netizens commented that the silhouette figures highly resembled those of Luis Manzano and Alex Gonzaga. On March 17, 2014, it was confirmed by the official PR website of ABS-CBN that the show will be hosted by Luis Manzano and Alex Gonzaga.

== Auditions ==
Cities in the Philippines where the auditions for the first season of The Voice Kids were held.

The show was created after the main version garnered immense popularity and high television ratings. ABS-CBN later announced that auditions will start November 2013. Later in January 2014, auditions for the Luzon, Metro Manila, Visayas, and Mindanao regions were announced and will be held together with the auditions for the second season of The Voice of the Philippines.

More than ten thousand kids auditioned for the first season.

On-ground auditions of The Voice Kids
Date	Location	Venue	Source
November 23, 2013	Mandaue, Cebu	Metro Gaisano Pacific Mall	
December 1, 2013	Pasay	Resorts World Manila	
January 11, 2014	Dumaguete, Negros Oriental	Robinsons Place Dumaguete	
January 11, 2014	Roxas, Capiz	Capiz Gym Villareal Stadium	
January 18, 2014	Cagayan de Oro	SM City Cagayan de Oro	
January 18, 2014	General Santos	KCC Mall of General Santos	
January 25, 2014	Pasay	Resorts World Manila	
January 25, 2014	Manila	Lucky Chinatown Mall	
February 1, 2014	Lucena, Quezon	Pacific Mall	
February 1, 2014	Dagupan	CSI Stadia	

== Prizes ==
The winner of The Voice Kids will receive one million peso contract from MCA Music, house and lot from Camella Homes, music and home appliance showcases, ₱1,000,000, and ₱1,000,000 worth of trust fund from Systema.

== Teams ==
Color key

- Winner
- Runner-up
- Third place
- Fourth place
- Eliminated in the Live shows
- Eliminated in the Sing-offs
- Eliminated in the Battles

Coaches	Top 54 artists					
Lea Salonga						
Lea Salonga	Darlene Vibares	Tonton Cabiles	Angel Aguilera	Shanne Dandan	Eufritz Santos	Jimboy Garcia
Lea Salonga	Marianne Interino	Karla Cruz	Genmarie Guiao	Echo Claridad	Giedie Laroco	Grace Alade
Lea Salonga	Kobe Viray	Lorenzo Cinco	Koko Luy	Camille Santos	Rein Pineda	Angelique Trinidad
Bamboo Mañalac						
Bamboo Mañalac	Juan Karlos Labajo	Edray Teodoro	Stacy Pineda	Borge Rivera	Nathan Bautista	Gem Capalad
Bamboo Mañalac	Maite Zubiri	Julienne Echavez	Natsumi Saito	Grazz Enriquez	Katherine Medina	Arianna Ocampo
Bamboo Mañalac	Edera Lopez	Allina Malaiba	Junmark Armeci	Douglas Alabe	Zack Tabudlo	Rommel Bautista
Sarah Geronimo						
Sarah Geronimo	Lyca Gairanod	Darren Espanto	Gab Gomez	Diana Agustin	Earl Consolacion	Kyle Bernido
Sarah Geronimo	Isaac Zamudio	Lee Marcelino	JM & JC Urquico	Sam Shoaf	Musika Caubang	Mitz Tanguilan
Sarah Geronimo	Triscia Jumawid	Hannah Mae Uganiza	Twittle Dizon	Don Angelo Santos	Rica Ito	Khen Lobaton

== Blind auditions ==
In an article Lea Salonga wrote in Philippine Daily Inquirer and was published on January 16, 2014, she said the blind auditions will be filmed by March. On March 15, 2014, Sarah Geronimo, in an interview by Jocelyn Dimaculangan from the Philippine Entertainment Portal, revealed that the first day of Blind auditions will be filmed on March 17, 2014. It was filmed until March 20, 2014 at Studio 10 of ABS-CBN Broadcasting Center in Quezon City, Metro Manila. More than 100 kids were invited for the Blind auditions.

In a Philippine Daily Inquirer article posted by Salonga on March 20, 2014, she said that each team will be composed of 18 artists.

It aired from May 24 to June 22 for 10 episodes with a total of 84 aspiring contestants.

Color key

✔	Coach hit his/her "I WANT YOU" button
	Artist defaulted to this coach's team
	Artist elected to join this coach's team
	Artist eliminated with no coach pressing his or her "I WANT YOU" button

=== Episode 1 (May 24) ===
On its first episode, the coaches performed an opening number. Sarah Geronimo sang "Right Now" first, then followed by Bamboo singing "Happy", and Lea Salonga singing "Story of My Life." After their individual performances, all the three of them together performed "Live While We're Young."

Order	Artist	Age	Hometown	Song	Coach's and contestant's choices		
Order	Artist	Age	Hometown	Song	Lea	Bamboo	Sarah
1	Koko Luy	11	Makati	"Forget You"	✔	✔	—
2	Jimboy Garcia	12	Paniqui, Tarlac	"Faithfully"	✔	✔	✔
3	Grazz Enriquez	13	Quezon City	"Born This Way"	—	✔	—
4	JM & JC Urquico	11 & 11	Marikina	"When I Was Your Man"	—	—	✔
5	Don Wilson Mojado	11	Lipa City, Batangas	"The Way You Make Me Feel"	—	—	—
6	Darlene Vibares	10	Antipolo	"Girl on Fire"	✔	✔	✔

=== Episode 2 (May 25) ===
Order	Artist	Age	Hometown	Song	Coach's and contestant's choices		
Order	Artist	Age	Hometown	Song	Lea	Bamboo	Sarah
1	Junmark Armecin	14	Cebu City	"Mula Sa Puso"	—	✔	—
2	Julia Klarisse Base	9	Pasig	"Sunday Morning/Roar"	—	—	—
3	Zack Tabudlo	12	Las Piñas	"Sunday Morning"	—	✔	—
4	Lyca Gairanod	9	Tanza, Cavite	"Halik"	—	—	✔
5	Amy Nobleza	12	Las Piñas	"Defying Gravity"	—	—	—
6	Qrkuni Muyalde	N/A	N/A	"What a Wonderful World"	—	—	—
7	John Alfred	N/A	N/A	"You Give Love a Bad Name"	—	—	—
8	Nathan Bautista	8	Imus, Cavite	"Don't Stop Believin'"	✔	✔	✔

=== Episode 3 (May 31) ===
Order	Artist	Age	Hometown	Song	Coach's and contestant's choices		
Order	Artist	Age	Hometown	Song	Lea	Bamboo	Sarah
1	Echo Claridad	8	Bacolod	"Too Much Heaven"	✔	✔	✔
2	Czexyle Portuza	9	Koronadal City	"Chinito"	—	—	—
3	Julienne Echavez	11	Las Piñas	"Grow Old With You"	—	✔	—
4	Tonton Cabilles	11	Naga, Cebu	"Dance with My Father"	✔	—	—
5	Gab Gomez	13	Quezon City	"Ako Na Lang"	—	—	✔
6	Earl Consolacion	12	Negros Occidental	"Lipad ng Pangarap"	—	—	✔
7	Camille Santos	10	Greenhills, San Juan City	"Maybe"	✔	—	✔

=== Episode 4 (June 1) ===
Order	Artist	Age	Hometown	Song	Coach's and contestant's choices		
Order	Artist	Age	Hometown	Song	Lea	Bamboo	Sarah
1	Peter Angelo Echaluse	8	San Pedro, Laguna	"Iris"	—	—	—
2	Arianna Ocampo	13	Las Piñas	"Tattooed Heart"	✔	✔	✔
3	Isha	N/A	N/A	"Bring Me To Life"	—	—	—
4	LJ	N/A	N/A	"Roar"	—	—	—
5	Richell	N/A	Davao City	"Diamonds"	—	—	—
6	Karla Cruz	8	Taytay, Rizal	"Titanium"	✔	—	—
7	Rommel Bautista	13	Tondo, Manila	"Ako'y Sa'yo, Ika'y Akin"	—	✔	—
8	Genmarie Guiao	9	Dumaguete	"The Greatest Love of All"	✔	—	✔
9	Twittle Dizon	14	Koronadal City	"Gising na, Kaibigan Ko"	—	—	✔
10	Shannon	N/A	N/A	"Chasing Pavements"	—	—	—
11	Alriz	N/A	Australia	"I Have Nothing"	—	—	—
12	Darren Espanto	13	Calgary, Alberta, Canada	"Domino"	—	✔	✔

=== Episode 5 (June 7) ===
Order	Artist	Age	Hometown	Song	Coach's and contestant's choices		
Order	Artist	Age	Hometown	Song	Lea	Bamboo	Sarah
1	Isaac Zamudio	10	Santa Ana, Manila	"Habang May Buhay"	✔	✔	✔
2	Lucky Davon Beronio	12	Cagayan de Oro	"Love on Top"	—	—	—
3	Mitz Tanguilan	12	Montalban, Rizal	"Heaven"	✔	✔	✔
4	Musika Caubang	12	Nueva Ecija	"Secrets"	—	—	✔
5	Angelique Trinidad	12	Calamba, Laguna	"Maghintay Ka Lamang"	✔	—	✔
6	Mega Frandio Oane	12	Occidental Mindoro	"Buko"	—	—	—
7	Edera Lopez	12	Roxas City, Capiz	"Clarity"	—	✔	—
8	Juan Karlos Labajo	13	Cebu City	"Grow Old With You"	—	✔	✔

=== Episode 6 (June 8) ===
Order	Artist	Age	Hometown	Song	Coach's and contestant's choices		
Order	Artist	Age	Hometown	Song	Lea	Bamboo	Sarah
1	Mark Daniel Verdillo	13	Caloocan	"You Give Love a Bad Name"	—	—	—
2	Natsumi Saito	12	Cabanatuan	"Price Tag"	—	✔	—
3	Lee Marcelino	11	Santo Tomas, Batangas	"Bulag, Pipi at Bingi"	—	—	✔
4	Edray Leona Teodoro	13	Navotas	"Killing Me Softly with His Song"	—	✔	—
5	Maite Zubiri	13	Malaybalay City, Bukidnon	"Stuck Like Glue"	—	✔	✔
6	Rica Ito	12	Teresa, Rizal	"Set Fire to the Rain"	—	—	✔
7	Rosarely Avila	13	Pasay	"I Believe"	—	—	—
8	Marianne Interino	11	Olongapo City	"Luha"	✔	—	—
9	Giedie Laroco	13	Dagupan	"The Power of Love"	✔	✔	✔

=== Episode 7 (June 14) ===
Order	Artist	Age	Hometown	Song	Coach's and contestant's choices		
Order	Artist	Age	Hometown	Song	Lea	Bamboo	Sarah
1	Sam Shoaf	9	Parañaque	"Treasure"	✔	—	✔
2	Lorenzo Cinco	13	Cagayan de Oro	"What Makes You Beautiful"	✔	✔	—
3	Don Angelo Santos	12	Imus, Cavite	"L-O-V-E"	—	—	✔
4	Louise Malaza	9	Davao City	"Skyscraper"	—	—	—
5	Eufritz Santos	11	Tondo, Manila	"Hanggang Ngayon"	✔	✔	✔
6	Fatima Duzon	13	Olongapo City	"Love Story"	—	—	—
7	Christa May	N/A	N/A	"Eye of the Tiger"	—	—	—
8	Melvin	N/A	N/A	"Wrecking Ball"	—	—	—
9	Zyrus	N/A	N/A	"Ikaw ang Pangarap"	—	—	—
10	Kobe Viray	13	Koronadal, South Cotabato	"For Once in My Life"	✔	—	✔

=== Episode 8 (June 15) ===
Order	Artist	Age	Hometown	Song	Coach's and contestant's choices		
Order	Artist	Age	Hometown	Song	Lea	Bamboo	Sarah
1	Kyle Bernido	13	Cagayan de Oro	"We Can't Stop"	✔	✔	✔
2	Gem Capalad	10	Indang, Cavite	"Just Give Me a Reason"	—	✔	—
3	Jake Llamas	8	Makati	"Never Say Never"	—	—	—
4	Shello De Castro	14	Santa Cruz, Laguna	"Fame"	—	—	—
5	Shanne Dandan	13	Quezon City	"Tadhana"	✔	✔	—
6	Stacy Pineda	12	Quezon City	"Royals"	—	✔	—
7	Allina Malaiba	14	Batangas City	"Somewhere"	—	✔	—
8	Khen Lobaton	13	Bacolod	"Empire State of Mind"	✔	✔	✔

=== Episode 9 (June 21) ===
Order	Artist	Age	Hometown	Song	Coach's and contestant's choices		
Order	Artist	Age	Hometown	Song	Lea	Bamboo	Sarah
1	Nichole Morgan	9	Baguio	"Dungdungwen Kanto"	—	—	—
2	Isabel Garsuta	13	Tagbilaran, Bohol	"Part of Me"	—	—	—
3	Diana Agustin	11	San Pedro, Laguna	"Next in Line"	✔	—	✔
4	Rein Pineda	11	Valenzuela City	"Kulasisi"	✔	—	✔
5	Douglas Alabe	11	Iloilo City	"Yesterday's Dream"	—	✔	—
6	Katherine Medina	14	Taguig City	"If I Ain't Got You"	—	✔	✔
7	Angel Aguilera	14	Bacoor, Cavite	"Halo"	✔	✔	✔

=== Episode 10 (June 22) ===
Order	Artist	Age	Hometown	Song	Coach's and contestant's choices		
Order	Artist	Age	Hometown	Song	Lea	Bamboo	Sarah
1	Grace Alade	14	Binangonan, Rizal	"Try It on My Own"	✔	✔	✔
2	Billy Joel Mendoza	14	Las Piñas	"Dreams"	Team full	—	—
3	Hannah Mae Uganiza	11	Ilocos Norte	"Lipad ng Pangarap"	Team full	✔	✔
4	Kenneth Semira	10	Angono, Rizal	"Just the Way You Are"	Team full	—	—
5	Triscia Jumawid	13	General Santos	"Halo"	Team full	—	✔
6	Nikolas Graham	14	Manila	"The Way You Make Me Feel"	Team full	—	Team full
7	Franz Palapo	13	Marikina	"No One"	Team full	—	Team full
8	Jaydee	N/A	N/A	"Pusong Bato"	Team full	—	Team full
9	Borge Rivera	13	General Santos	"Stuttering"	Team full	✔	Team full

== The Battles ==
Filming began on June 23 to 25, 2014. From more than 100 kids invited to the Blind auditions only 54 artists advanced to the Battles, where each coach will pick three artists and pit them together into a battle of vocals. The winner of the battle will only be determined by his or her coach while other coaches can only provide their comments to the performances of the artists. The winner will earn a spot in the six artist-slots per team and will advance to the next round, the Sing-offs.

All coaches were aided by Annie Quintos of The Company in vocally coaching the artists during the Battles.

The first episode of the Battles will air on June 28, 2014, while the Sing-offs' first episode will air on June 29, 2014.

Color key

Artist won the Battle and advanced to the Sing-offs
Artist lost the Battle and was eliminated

On June 28, 2014, Team Lea, headed by Lea Salonga, opened the show in singing Sara Bareilles's "Brave." On the opening of the July 5, 2014 episode, Team Bamboo, headed by Bamboo Mañalac, sang Rivermaya's "Awit ng Kabataan." On the July 12, 2014 episode, Team Sarah, headed by Sarah Geronimo, sang Demi Lovato's "Neon Lights."

Episode	Coach	Order	Artists			Song	Ref.
Episode 11 (June 28)	Lea Salonga	1	Tonton Cabiles	Genmarie Guiao	Echo Claridad	"May Bukas Pa"	
Episode 11 (June 28)	Lea Salonga	2	Eufritz Santos	Koko Luy	Camille Santos	"Love Song"	
Episode 11 (June 28)	Lea Salonga	3	Marianne Interino	Karla Cruz	Darlene Vibares	"Firework"	
Episode 11 (June 28)	Lea Salonga	4	Grace Alade	Angel Aguilera	Giedie Laroco	"When You Believe"	
Episode 12 (June 29)	Lea Salonga	5	Angelique Trinidad	Rein Pineda	Jimboy Garcia	"Anak ng Pasig"	
Episode 12 (June 29)	Lea Salonga	6	Kobe Viray	Lorenzo Cinco	Shanne Dandan	"Hey, Soul Sister"	
Episode 13 (July 5)	Bamboo Mañalac	1	Julienne Echavez	Juan Karlos Labajo	Maite Zubiri	"A Thousand Years"	
Episode 13 (July 5)	Bamboo Mañalac	2	Katherine Medina	Stacy Pineda	Arianna Ocampo	"Ain't No Mountain High Enough"	
Episode 13 (July 5)	Bamboo Mañalac	3	Edera Lopez	Borge Rivera	Allina Malaiba	"The Scientist"	
Episode 13 (July 5)	Bamboo Mañalac	4	Douglas Alabe	Nathan Bautista	Junmark Armecin	"I Don't Want to Miss a Thing"	
Episode 14 (July 6)	Bamboo Mañalac	5	Rommel Bautista	Zack Tabudlo	Gem Capalad	"I'll Be There"	
Episode 14 (July 6)	Bamboo Mañalac	6	Natsumi Saito	Edray Teodoro	Grazz Enriquez	"Breakaway"	
Episode 15 (July 12)	Sarah Geronimo	1	Musika Caubang	Gab Gomez	Mitz Tanguilan	"A Thousand Miles"	
Episode 15 (July 12)	Sarah Geronimo	2	JM & JC Urquico	Darren Espanto	Sam Shoaf	"What Makes You Beautiful"	
Episode 15 (July 12)	Sarah Geronimo	3	Triscia Jumawid	Hannah Uganiza	Diana Agustin	"Better Days"	
Episode 15 (July 12)	Sarah Geronimo	4	Isaac Zamudio	Lyca Gairanod	Lee Marcelino	"Isang Lahi"	
Episode 16 (July 13)	Sarah Geronimo	5	Kyle Bernido	Khen Lobaton	Rica Ito	"Telephone"	
Episode 16 (July 13)	Sarah Geronimo	6	Don Angelo Santos	Twittle Dizon	Earl Consolacion	"Dadalhin"	

== The Sing-offs ==
The Sing-offs immediately follows the Battles. Per team, two artists will be chosen by their respective coaches for the Live shows. Unlike the Battles where the coach picks for the song what the artists are going to sing, in the Sing-offs the decision is solely done by the artists.

The first Sing-offs episode was aired on June 29, 2014.

Color key

Artist was saved by his/her coach in the Sing-offs and advanced to the Live-shows
Artist lost the Sing-offs and was eliminated

Episode	Coach	Order	Artist	Song	Result
Episode 12 (June 29)	Lea Salonga	1	Tonton Cabiles	"It Will Rain"	Advanced
Episode 12 (June 29)	Lea Salonga	2	Angel Aguilera	"I Believe I Can Fly"	Eliminated
Episode 12 (June 29)	Lea Salonga	3	Eufritz Santos	"Who You Are"	Eliminated
Episode 12 (June 29)	Lea Salonga	4	Darlene Vibares	"And I Am Telling You"	Advanced
Episode 12 (June 29)	Lea Salonga	5	Shanne Dandan	"On My Own"	Eliminated
Episode 12 (June 29)	Lea Salonga	6	Jimboy Garcia	"Unchained Melody"	Eliminated
Episode 14 (July 6)	Bamboo Mañalac	1	Stacy Pineda	"Payphone"	Eliminated
Episode 14 (July 6)	Bamboo Mañalac	2	Gem Capalad	"Iingatan Ka"	Eliminated
Episode 14 (July 6)	Bamboo Mañalac	3	Juan Karlos Labajo	"Stay"	Advanced
Episode 14 (July 6)	Bamboo Mañalac	4	Edray Teodoro	"Tulak ng Bibig, Kabig ng Dibdib"	Advanced
Episode 14 (July 6)	Bamboo Mañalac	5	Borge Rivera	"Scared to Death"	Eliminated
Episode 14 (July 6)	Bamboo Mañalac	6	Nathan Bautista	"It's My Life"	Eliminated
Episode 16 (July 13)	Sarah Geronimo	1	Darren Espanto	"Listen"	Advanced
Episode 16 (July 13)	Sarah Geronimo	2	Gab Gomez	"American Boy"	Eliminated
Episode 16 (July 13)	Sarah Geronimo	3	Earl Consolacion	"Ikaw"	Eliminated
Episode 16 (July 13)	Sarah Geronimo	4	Kyle Bernido	"No Air"	Eliminated
Episode 16 (July 13)	Sarah Geronimo	5	Diana Agustin	"Natutulog ba ang Diyos"	Eliminated
Episode 16 (July 13)	Sarah Geronimo	6	Lyca Gairanod	"Dance with My Father"^{1}	Advanced

Note

1. Lyca Gairanod sang the Tagalog version of "Dance with My Father."

== Live shows ==
The Live shows were held in Newport Performing Arts Theater, Resorts World Manila, Newport City, Pasay starting from July 19, 2014.

Unlike in the first season of the main version of the franchise, the outcome in the Live shows of the kids version solely came from the results of the public's votes. Voting lines will be opened every Saturdays after all the performances of the artists, and will end on Sundays. In the semifinals, the top four artists coming from the results of the public votes will advance to the Finals.

Color key

Artist was saved by the public's vote
Artist was eliminated

=== Week 1: Semifinals (July 19 & 20) ===
Order	Coach	Artist	Song	Result
1	Lea Salonga	Tonton Cabiles	"One Day in Your Life"	Eliminated
2	Bamboo Mañalac	Edray Teodoro	"Beautiful"	Eliminated
3	Sarah Geronimo	Darren Espanto	"One Moment In Time"	Safe
4	Bamboo Mañalac	Juan Karlos Labajo	"Sway"	Safe
5	Sarah Geronimo	Lyca Gairanod	"Pangarap na Bituin"	Safe
6	Lea Salonga	Darlene Vibares	"I Will Always Love You"	Safe

Non-competition performances
Order	Performer	Song
17.1	Top 6 Artists	"Good Time"/"It's Time"
17.2	Top 6 Artists with their coaches	"Meron Akong Ano"/"Ito ang Gusto Ko"
18.1	Tonton Cabiles, Darren Espanto, and Juan Karlos Labajo	"One Way or Another"
18.2	Alex Gonzaga and Gloc-9	"I Knew You Were Trouble"
18.3	Darlene Vibares, Edray Teodoro, and Lyca Gairanod	"Let It Go"
18.4	Top 6 Artists	"Narda"

=== Week 2: Finals (July 26 & 27) ===
The voting mechanics for the Live finals will be based on the accumulated votes per round: power ballad round, upbeat song round, and a duet with a celebrity round. Voting lines will only be opened between the end and the start of each rounds. At the end of the three rounds, all votes will be tallied and the artist gaining the highest accumulated votes will be declared as the winner.

The first episode of the Finals was opened by the top four artists with their medley rendition of Sponge Cola's "Bitiw," Rocksteddy's "Superhero," and Sandwich's "Sugod."

On the second episode of the Finals, the show was opened by the top four artists of the first season of The Voice of the Philippines, the three coaches, and the top four artists singing American Authors' "Best Day of My Life" and New Radicals' "You Get What You Give."

After being declared as the champion, Lyca Gairanod sang "Narito Ako."

Color key

Artist was proclaimed as the winner
Artist ended as the runner-up
Artist ended as the third placer
Artist ended as the fourth placer

Coach	Artist	July 26				July 27			Result
Coach	Artist	Order	Power ballad song	Order	Upbeat song	Order	Duet song	with	Result
Sarah Geronimo	Lyca Gairanod	4	"Narito Ako"	2	"Call Me Maybe"	4	"Basang-basa sa Ulan"	Aegis	Winner
Sarah Geronimo	Darren Espanto	3	"Ngayon"	4	"Somebody to Love"	1	"You Are My Song"	Martin Nievera	Runner-up
Bamboo Mañalac	Juan Karlos Labajo	1	"Yesterday"	1	"Runaway Baby"	3	"Eto na Naman"	Gary Valenciano	Third place
Lea Salonga	Darlene Vibares	2	"Sana'y Wala Nang Wakas"	3	"Louder"	2	"You Don't Have to Say You Love Me"	Lani Misalucha	Fourth place

Non-competition performances
Order	Performer	Song
19.1	Top 6 Artists	"Bitiw"/"Superhero"/"Sugod"
20.1	The Voice of the Philippines Top 4, Top 4 Artists, and The Voice Kids Coaches	"Best Day of My Life"/"You Get What You Give"
20.2	Lyca Gairanod (winner)	"Narito Ako"

== Elimination chart ==
=== Results summary ===
Color key
Artist's info

- Artist from Team Lea
- Artist from Team Bamboo
- Artist from Team Sarah

Result details

- Winner
- Runner-up
- Third place
- Fourth Place
- Artist was saved by the public
- Artist was saved by his/her coach
- Artist did not perform on that particular week
- Eliminated

Artist	The Sing-offs			Live Shows	
Artist	Sing-offs 1	Sing-offs 2	Sing-offs 3	Week 1: Semi-finals	Week 2: Finals
Lyca Gairanod			Safe	Safe	Winner
Darren Espanto			Safe	Safe	Runner-up
Juan Karlos Labajo		Safe		Safe	Third Place
Darlene Vibares	Safe			Safe	Fourth Place
Edray Teodoro		Safe		Eliminated	Eliminated (Semi-finals)
Tonton Cabiles	Safe			Eliminated	Eliminated (Semi-finals)
Gab Gomez			Eliminated	Eliminated (Sing-offs 3)	
Earl Consolacion			Eliminated	Eliminated (Sing-offs 3)	
Kyle Bernido			Eliminated	Eliminated (Sing-offs 3)	
Diana Agustin			Eliminated	Eliminated (Sing-offs 3)	
Stacy Pineda		Eliminated	Eliminated (Sing-offs 2)		
Gem Capalad		Eliminated	Eliminated (Sing-offs 2)		
Borge Rivera		Eliminated	Eliminated (Sing-offs 2)		
Nathan Bautista		Eliminated	Eliminated (Sing-offs 2)		
Angel Aguilera	Eliminated	Eliminated (Sing-offs 1)			
Eufritz Santos	Eliminated	Eliminated (Sing-offs 1)			
Shanne Dandan	Eliminated	Eliminated (Sing-offs 1)			
Jimboy Garcia	Eliminated	Eliminated (Sing-offs 1)			

=== Teams ===
Artist's info

- Artist from Team Lea
- Artist from Team Sarah
- Artist from Team Bamboo

Result details

- Winner
- Runner-up
- Third place
- Fourth place
- Artist did not perform on that particular week
- Eliminated

Artist	The Sing-offs			Live Shows	
Artist	Sing-offs 1	Sing-offs 2	Sing-offs 3	Week 1: Semi-finals	Week 2: Finals
Darlene Vibares	Coach's Choice			Advanced	Fourth Place
Tonton Cabiles	Coach's Choice			Eliminated	
Angel Aguilera	Eliminated				
Eufritz Santos	Eliminated				
Shanne Dandan	Eliminated				
Jimboy Garcia	Eliminated				
Juan Karlos Labajo		Coach's Choice		Advanced	Third Place
Edray Teodoro		Coach's Choice		Eliminated	
Stacy Pineda		Eliminated			
Gem Capalad		Eliminated			
Borge Rivera		Eliminated			
Nathan Bautista		Eliminated			
Lyca Gairanod			Coach's Choice	Advanced	Winner
Darren Espanto			Coach's Choice	Advanced	Runner-up
Gab Gomez			Eliminated		
Earl Consolacion			Eliminated		
Kyle Bernido			Eliminated		
Diana Agustin			Eliminated		

== Reception ==
=== Television ratings ===
Television ratings for the first season of The Voice of the Philippines on ABS-CBN were gathered from two major sources, namely from AGB Nielsen and Kantar Media. AGB Nielsen's survey ratings were gathered from Mega Manila households, while Kantar Media's survey ratings were gathered from urban and rural households all over the Philippines.

Episode		Original airdate	Timeslot (PST)	AGB Nielsen			Kantar Media			Source
Episode		Original airdate	Timeslot (PST)	Rating	Timeslot	Primetime	Rating	Timeslot	Primetime	Source
1	"The Blind auditions premiere"	May 24, 2014	Saturday 6:45 p.m.	25.0%	#1	#1	33.3%	#1	#1	
2	"The Blind auditions – part 2"	May 25, 2014	Sunday 7:30 p.m.	27.9%	#1	#1	35.8%	#1	#1	
3	"The Blind auditions – part 3"	May 31, 2014	Saturday 6:45 p.m.	25.1%	#1	#2	33.6%	#1	#1	
4	"The Blind auditions – part 4"	June 1, 2014	Sunday 7:30 p.m.	27.0%	#1	#1	35.3%	#1	#1	
5	"The Blind auditions – part 5"	June 7, 2014	Saturday 6:45 p.m.	25.9%	#1	#1	34.4%	#1	#1	
6	"The Blind auditions – part 6"	June 8, 2014	Sunday 7:30 p.m.	29.6%	#1	#1	37.6%	#1	#1	
7	"The Blind auditions – part 7"	June 14, 2014	Saturday 6:45 p.m.	25.7%	#1	#1	35.5%	#1	#1	
8	"The Blind auditions – part 8"	June 15, 2014	Sunday 7:30 p.m.	29.4%	#1	#1	37.5%	#1	#1	
9	"The Blind auditions – part 9"	June 21, 2014	Saturday 6:45 p.m.	23.1%	#1	#3	34.1%	#1	#1	
10	"The Blind auditions – part 10"	June 22, 2014	Sunday 7:30 p.m.	26.7%	#1	#1	36.1%	#1	#1	
11	"The Battles premiere"	June 28, 2014	Saturday 6:45 p.m.	23.7%	#1	#2	34.2%	#1	#1	
12	"The Sing-offs premiere"	June 29, 2014	Sunday 7:30 p.m.	26.9%	#1	#1	35.8%	#1	#1	
13	"The Battles – part 2"	July 5, 2014	Saturday 6:45 p.m.	25.1%	#1	#2	34.8%	#1	#1	
14	"The Sing-offs – part 2"	July 6, 2014	Sunday 7:30 p.m.	27.4%	#1	#1	33.8%	#1	#1	
15	"The Battles – part 3"	July 12, 2014	Saturday 6:45 p.m.	25.1%	#1	#2	33.8%	#1	#1	
16	"The Sing-offs – part 3"	July 13, 2014	Sunday 7:30 p.m.	27.5%	#1	#1	32.8%	#1	#1	
17	"The Live Semifinals premiere"	July 19, 2014	Saturday 6:45 p.m.	23.7%	#1	#1	29.4%	#1	#1	
18	"The Live Semifinals – part 2"	July 20, 2014	Sunday 7:30 p.m.	23.2%	#1	#1	28.6%	#1	#1	
19	"The Live Finals premiere"	July 26, 2014	Saturday 6:45 p.m.	31.8%	#1	#1	37.7%	#1	#1	
20	"The Live Finals – part 2"	July 27, 2014	Sunday 6:15 p.m.	29.2%	#1	#1	37.2%	#1	#1	
Season average				26.45%	#1	#1	34.57%	#1	#1	
