= 2015 in Philippine music =

The following is a list of notable events that are related to Philippine music in 2015.

== Events ==
=== January ===
- January 8 – Diego Loyzaga, Tippy Dos Santos and Erica Abello were announced as the new MYX VJs.
- January 13 – Hale had their mini reunion concert less than 5 years after their break up. On January 27, they released their first single in more than 4 years entitled See You.
- January 25 – Kamikazee announced that after this year they will take a hiatus.

=== February ===
- February 19 – The nominees for the Myx Music Awards 2015 were announced through an online webcast.

=== March ===
- March 1 – Jason Dy of Team Sarah was declared as the grand winner of the second season of The Voice of the Philippines held at the Newport Performing Arts Theater, Resorts World Manila. He was coached by Sarah Geronimo.
- March 14 – The Philippine version of Your Face Sounds Familiar, a singing and impersonation competition wherein celebrities will impersonate other iconic singers premiered on ABS-CBN. It will be hosted by Billy Crawford while Jed Madela, Gary Valenciano and Sharon Cuneta will serve as judges.
- March 25
  - Myx Music Awards 2015 at the Samsung Hall.
  - Joey Generoso had officially left his band, Side A, in pursuit of a solo career.
  - Jamie Rivera received an Award for Excellence for Musical Arts & Culture from the Youth Leadership Summit at the Carlos P. Romulo Auditorium.

=== April ===
- April 1 – Filipino rock band, Urbandub announced that they have decided to call it quits after 15 years in the industry during a radio show in Jam 88.3. Their farewell concert is scheduled on May 9, to coincide with the group's 15th anniversary.
- April 17 – The 12 finalists for the Philippine Popular Music Festival 2015 were announced.

=== June ===
- June 5 – The submission of entries for the Himig Handog P-Pop Love Songs 2016 officially opens. Deadline of submission is on July 31.
- June 6 – The Voice Kids returned to Philippine television on ABS-CBN for a second season. Sarah Geronimo, Bamboo Mañalac and Lea Salonga all returned as coaches while Luis Manzano returned as its main host with Robi Domingo and Yeng Constantino joining him as his new co-hosts, the latter replacing Alex Gonzaga.
- June 7 – Comedian Melai Cantiveros was named the first grand winner of Your Face Sounds Familiar at the Newport Performing Arts Theater at Resorts World Manila.
- June 19 – The interpreters for the Philpop 2015 were unveiled.

=== July ===
- July 1 – Sarah Geronimo with her song Kilometro represented the Philippines in the 10th International Song Contest:The Global Sound hosted by Australian jury, as one of the 70 international semi-finalists and later on advanced as one of the top 25 finalists. At the final round, she won the Gold Global Sound Award as the top recognition.
- July 22 – American singer Chris Brown was placed under the Philippine government's immigration lookout bulletin, hours before his solo concert at the SM Mall of Asia Arena. Brown was able to leave Manila on July 24 after he had filed a departure clearance due to a legal issue between him and the Iglesia ni Cristo that prevented him from leaving the Philippines.

=== August ===
- August 30 – Elha Nympha, coached by Bamboo Mañalac, won the second season of The Voice Kids held at the Newport Performing Arts Theater, Resorts World Manila.

=== September ===
- September 21 – Star Music, the music division of ABS-CBN Corporation's Star Creatives, acquired the copyrights to around 116 original compositions of Tito Sotto, Vic Sotto and Joey de Leon which includes songs popularized by 70's group VST & Co., Sharon Cuneta, and Nora Aunor, and popular songs such as "Ipagpatawad Mo," "Tayo'y Magsayawan" and "Awitin Mo, Isasayaw Ko."

== Debuts ==
=== Soloist ===
- Alex Gonzaga
- Edward Benosa
- Julian Trono
- Rita De Guzman
- Yassi Pressman
- Vanessa Quillao
- Jacob Benedicto
- Maris Racal
- Marlo Mortel
- Alexander Diaz
- Iñigo Pascual
- DJ Moophs
- Alexandra
- Reneé Pionso
- Kay Cal
- JC Padilla
- Hazel Faith dela Cruz
- Aleph
- Muffet
- Yexel Sebastian
- Michelle Ortega
- Migz Haleco
- Pauline Cueto
- Nitoy Mallillin
- Matteo Guidicelli
- Reese Lansangan

=== Bands/Groups ===
- Reo Brothers
- Harana
- Rouge Band
- MMJ
- SUD

== Reunion ==
- Hale
- Idolito dela Cruz

== Disbandment ==
- Urbandub
- Kamikazee (band)

== Albums released ==
The following albums are released in 2015 locally. Note: All soundtracks are not included in this list.

Date released	Title	Artist(s)	Label(s)	Source
January 17	Zilch	Pupil	MCA Music	
January 19	Reo Brothers of Tacloban	Reo Brothers	Star Music	
February 6	Master of Soul	Thor Dulay	Star Music	
February 11	New Heart	Barbie Almalbis	12 Stone Records	
February 14	Reid Alert	James Reid	Viva Records	
February 14	Ultrablessed: Thank You Edition	Sponge Cola	Universal Records	
February 15	Haymabu	Siakol	Synergy Music	
February 26	Debris	Sandwich	PolyEast Records	
March 2	OPM Fresh	Various Artists	Star Music	
March 2	I Am Alex G.	Alex Gonzaga	Star Music	
March 16	Love Revisited	Nikki Gil	Universal Records	
March 19	Harana	Harana	Star Music	
March 20	Morissette	Morissette	Star Music	
March 25	Elevated	Jay R	HomeWorkz Music	
March 30	Time and Space	Hale	Warner Music Philippines	
March 30	Beverly Caimen	Beverly Caimen	GMA Records	
March 30	The Neon Hour	B.P. Valenzuela	Independent	
April 8	Langit. Luha.	Silent Sanctuary	Ivory Music and Video	
April 13	Gravity	Gravity	Ivory Music and Video	
April 18	Synthesis	Glaiza de Castro	Homeworkz Music	
April 19	Chinita Princess	Kim Chiu	Star Music	
April 19	Novela	Janno Gibbs	GMA Records	
April 20	Rebirth	Salbakuta	HomeWorkz Music	
April 26	Rita Daniela	Rita De Guzman	GMA Records	
April 30	Rapsteddy Kinagat ng Seven Lions	Rocksteddy	12 Stone Records	
May 2	Iconic	Jed Madela	Star Music	
May 5	Big Mouth Big Band	Martin Nievera	PolyEast Records	
May 7	In Love	Maja Salvador	Ivory Music and Video	
May 11	Love.Lost.Found	Kithara	Warner Music Philippines	
May 18	Araw Gabi: Mga Awit ni Maestro Ryan	Aiza Seguerra	Universal Records	
May 22	Fresh Filter: Volume 1	Various Artists	Independent	
May 25	Puede Nang Mangarap	Lyca Gairanod	MCA Music	
June 2	Beginnings	Zsa Zsa Padilla	PolyEast Records	
June 7	Yassi	Yassi Pressman	Viva Records	
June 7	I Feel Good	Daniel Padilla	Star Music	
June 8	Screenburn	Never the Strangers	Universal Records	
June 12	Square One	Square One	MCA Music	
June 14	Jukebox	Jovit Baldivino	Star Music	
June 15	YJV	Young JV	Star Music	
June 19	Headlights	Save Me Hollywood	12 Stone Records	
July 3	JK	Juan Karlos Labajo	MCA Music	
July 3	Michelle Ortega	Michelle Ortega	Universal Records	
July 11	Simply Bossa	Shirley Vy	Universal Records	
July 21	Nakakabaliw	Shamrock	Star Music	
July 24	Janella Salvador	Janella Salvador	Star Music	
July 24	Singles – Bossa Nova Trio	Sitti	MCA Music	
July 28	Ryan Christopher	Ryan Christopher Sy	Ivory Music and Video	
July 31	Walking Distance	Smugglaz	Warner Music Philippines	
August 1	RJ Orig	Ramon Jacinto	RJ Productions	
August 7	Z	Zendee Rose Tenerefe	MCA Music	
August 16	Daryl Ong	Daryl Ong	Star Music	
August 21	Honeymoon	Jensen and The Flips	MCA Music	
August 24	Cherryz Infatuation	Cherryz Mendoza	PolyEast Records	
August 28	Most Requested Playlist	Kris Lawrence	Universal Records	
August 28	Jason Dy	Jason Dy	MCA Music	
August 31	Marion	Marion Aunor	Star Music	
September 11	Happy Break Up	Donnalyn Bartolome	Viva Records	
September 25	Schizoprano	Nicole Asensio	MCA Music	
September 25	Hesus Tanging Hiling	April Boy Regino	GMA Records	
October 1	Dreamer	Mica Javier	Homeworkz Music	
October 9	Tippy Dos Santos	Tippy Dos Santos	Universal Records	
October 12	Champion Reborn – EP Part 1	Erik Santos	Star Music	
October 17	Wish I May	Alden Richards	GMA Records	
October 17	My Love Story	Toni Gonzaga	Star Music	
October 20	Rise Heart	Victory Worship	Every Nation Music	
October 22	Maxine Tiongson	Maxine Tiongson	Ivory Music and Video	
October 23	Greetings from Callalily	Callalily	Universal Records	
October 23	Always and Ever	Six Part Invention	Universal Records	
October 30	Bless This Mess	Bamboo Mañalac	PolyEast Records	
November 9	A Different Playground	Karylle	PolyEast Records	
November 11	Champion Reborn	Erik Santos	Star Music	
November 14	Oh, Flamingo!	Oh, Flamingo!	Wide Eyed Records Manila	
November 17	Bawat Daan	Ebe Dancel	Star Music	
November 18	Super Vintage Christmas Guitar Instrumentals	Ramon Jacinto	RJ Productions	
November 19	Falling in Love	Alyssa Angeles	Synergy Music	
November 20	Matteo Guidicelli	Matteo Guidicelli	Star Music	
November 20	Back To Love	Jolina Magdangal	Star Music	
November 20	Bailey	Bailey May	Star Music	
November 27	Dating Gawi	Rico Blanco	Universal Records	
November 30	Lightfoot	tide/edit	A Spur of the Moment Project	
December 4	The Great Unknown	Sarah Geronimo	Viva Records	
December 6	Arigato, Internet!	Reese Lansangan	Independent	
December 7	P.A.R.D.	P.A.R.D.	PolyEast Records	
December 11	Christmas Love Duets	Kathryn Bernardo and Daniel Padilla	Star Music	
December 18	Nostalgia	The Company	Universal Records	
December 24	Through It All	Keiko Necesario	Independent	

== Concerts and music festivals ==
Concert date(s)	Artist(s)	Venue(s)	Concert title	Reference(s)
January 3	Martin Nievera	Samsung Hall	The Big Mouth Rocks the New Year!	
January 5	Bastille	World Trade Center Manila	Bastille Live in Manila	
January 10–11	Boys Republic	Lucky Chinatown; Venice Piazza Mall; Eastwood Mall	Boys Republic Live in Manila	
January 24	The 1975	SM Mall of Asia Arena	The 1975 LIVE!	
January 30	Various Artists	SM Mall of Asia Concert Grounds	Fusion: The 1st Philippine Music Festival	
January 30	Richard Poon and Rico J. Puno	Samsung Hall	Kailangan Kita: A Different Kind of Love	
January 31	Michael Bublé	SM Mall of Asia Arena	To Be Loved Tour	
February 1	The Vamps	SM Mall of Asia Arena	Asia-Pacific 2015 Tour	
February 2	Various Artists	City of Dreams Manila	City of Dreams Manila: Concert of Dreams	
February 3	Tycho	The Theater at Solaire Resort	Awake World Tour	
February 3	The Platters	New Performing Arts Theatre	The World Famous Platters: Valentines World Tour 2015	
February 4	Various Artists	CCP Tanghalang Aurelio Tolentino	The Sound of Life: Symphony Gala Concert Series	
February 7	Architects	SM Skydome	ARCHITECTS Live in Manila	
February 7	Various Artists	SM Mall of Asia Concert Grounds	Jacko Wacko Music Festival	
February 8	New Found Glory	SM Skydome	New Found Glory Live in Manila	
February 10	Dan Hill	New Performing Arts Theatre	Dan Hill: The King of Romance	
February 10	T-Pain	SM Mall of Asia Arena	The Drankin' Patna Tour	
February 10–14	Various Artists	UP Sunken Garden	UP Fair 2015: Soundtrack Natin 'To!	
February 12	Various Artists	Palacio de Maynila	An Evening with the OPM Legends	
February 12	Jed Madela	Music Museum	All Requests 4	
February 13	Jennylyn Mercado	SM Skydome	Jennylyn Mercado: Valentine Concert	
February 13	Joey Albert and The CompanY	Music Museum	Our Love Songs: OPM Greatest Hits Live	
February 13	Various Artists	PICC Plenary Hall	Reunited in Love The Greatest Hits Concert	
February 13	Russell Thompkins, Jr. and the New Stylistics	The Theater at Solaire Resort	Russell Thompkins Jr. and The New Stylistics Live in Manila Valentine's Day Dinner Concert	
February 13 – 14	Martin Nievera, Regine Velasquez, Gary Valenciano and Lani Misalucha	SM Mall of Asia Arena	Ultimate Concert	
February 13 – 14	Marlisa Punzalan	Lucky Chinatown; Eastwood Mall Open Park; Venica Piazza Mall	Marlisa Live in Manila	
February 14	Boyce Avenue	Smart Araneta Coliseum	Boyce Avenue Live in Manila	
February 14	Matt Monro Jr., The Platters and Christian Bautista	PICC Plenary Hall	Only You: An Evening of Romantic Hits	
February 14	Basil Valdez, Jacqui Magno, Pat Castillo, Louie Reyes and Tillie Moreno	Grand Ballroom at Solaire Resort	Here's to Love	
February 14	Kuh Ledesma	The Theater at Solaire Resort	The Music and the Magic of Love	
February 14	Nicole Scherzinger	Chaos Nightclub	Nicole Scherzinger at Chaos Valentine's Day Love Ball	
February 14	Russell Thompkins, Jr. and the New Stylistics	EDSA Shangri-La	Russell Thompkins Jr. and The New Stylistics Live in Manila Valentine's Day Dinner Concert	
February 14	The Platters	Grand Ballroom Fairmont Hotel Makati	A Valentine Date with The World Famous Platters	
February 14	Zsa Zsa Padilla	Music Museum	Beginnings "Zsa Zsa Padilla”	
February 15	Boyce Avenue	SMX Convention Center Davao	Boyce Avenue Live in Davao	
February 16	Matt Monro Jr., The Platters and Christian Bautista	New Performing Arts Theatre	Only You: An Evening of Romantic Hits	
February 19	How to Dress Well	Black Market	How to Dress Well Live in Manila	
February 20	Various Artists	Greenfield District	11:11 Music Festival	
February 20	Juan Karlos Labajo	Teatrino	JK: A Birthday Show	
February 21	Various Artists	Philippine Arena	OPM Live muSIKATin!	
February 25	Aicelle Santos	PETA Theatre	Class A	
February 28 – March 1	Hi-5	Meralco Theater	Hi-5 House Hits!	
March 5	Christina Perri	Smart Araneta Coliseum	The Head or Heart Tour	
March 6	Lamb of God	World Trade Center Manila	Lamb of God Live in Manila	
March 6	Nelly Miricioiu with Najib Ismail	Meralco Theater	Nelly Miricioiu: Live in Manila	
March 6–8	Various Artists	Puerto Galera	Malasimbo Music & Arts Festival 2015 and Malasimbo Lights & Dance Festival 2015	
March 7	Kuh Ledesma	Grand Ballroom at Solaire Resort	The Music and the Magic of Love: The Repeat	
March 12	Ed Sheeran	SM Mall of Asia Arena	X Tour	
March 13	Incubus	SM Mall of Asia Arena	Incubus Live in Manila 2015	
March 13–15	Various Artists	Puerto Galera	Malasimbo Music & Arts Festival 2015 and Malasimbo Lights & Dance Festival 2015	
March 15	Air Supply	The Theatre at Solaire Resort	Air Supply 40th Anniversary Concert	
March 16	Crosby, Stills, Nash & Young	Smart Araneta Coliseum	Crosby, Stills & Nash Live in Manila	
March 20	Big Mountain ft. David DiMuzio	Newport Performing Arts Theater	Irie Friday	
March 21	Various Artists	Island Cove Resort and Leisure Park	Exodus Music Festival	
March 21–22	One Direction	SM Mall of Asia Concert Grounds	On the Road Again Tour	
March 25	Go West	Newport Performing Arts Theater	Go West Live in Manila 2015	
March 26	Big Mountain	The Monastery, Cebu	Big Mountain Live in Cebu	
March 27	Various Artists	Music Museum	OPM Hitmen at the Music Museum	
March 28	Various Artists	Megatent Open Parking Lot	No Ordinary Summer 2015	
March 31	Mutemath	Bonifacio High Street Amphitheater	Mutemath Live in Manila	
April 5–7	Kye Kye	Bonifacio High Street Amphitheater	KYE KYE Live in Manila	
April 10	Hillsong Worship	SM Mall of Asia Arena	No Other Name Tour	
April 10	Julian Jordan	Chaos Nightclub	Julian Jordan Live in Manila	
April 10	Marion Aunor	Teatrino	Take a Chance Concert	
April 11	Rebelution	SM Skydome	Rebelution Live in Manila	
April 11	Songkran	Dusit Thani Manila	Songran at Dusit Thani	
April 11–12	Various Artists	Boracay	Summer MYX Fest 2015	
April 12	Super Junior, Girls' Generation, BtoB and Red Velvet	Philippine Arena	Best of Best in Manila	
April 15	Baek Ji-young	Newport Performing Arts Theater	Baek Z Young CLOSE UP 2015	
April 17	The Script	SM Mall of Asia Arena	No Sound Without Silence Tour	
April 17	KZ Tandingan	Music Museum	KZ: KZ Tandingan's First Major Solo Concert	
April 18	Charli XCX	Samsung Hall	Sucker World Tour	
April 18	Epik High	SM Skydome	Epik High Concert: Parade Manila 2015	
April 18	Nicky Romero	Chaos Nightclub	Nicky Romero Live in Manila	
April 22	U-KISS and Laboum	SM Mall of Asia Music Hall	U-KISS and Laboum Live in Manila	
April 24	Bamboo Mañalac	SMX Convention Center	GIG for GIVING	
April 24	Sitti	The Music Hall	Bossa Nova Night with Sitti	
April 24	Various Artists	Bonifacio Global City	Earth Day Jam 2015: 15 Years and Going Strong	
April 24	DJ Helena	Valkyrie Nightclub	DJ Helena @ Valkyrie Nightclub	
April 24–25	Various Artists	The Meeting Place; The Amphitheater	Castaway 2.0 Music Festival	
April 24–26	Chris Connor and The Steels	Newport Performing Arts Theater	ELVIS Mania in Manila	
April 25	Various Artists	Amoranto Stadium	Pulp Summerslam 15	
April 25	Various Artists (Kid Cudi, RAC, Augustana, Lewis Watson, The Jungle Giants, Youngblood Hawke, Hale, Kate Torralba, Sinyma, The Strange Creatures, Austin, CRWN, Fxxxyblnt, BP Valenzuela, The After School Special, Similar Objects)	Globe Circuit Events Grounds	Wanderland Music and Arts Festival 2015	
April 25	Alex Gonzaga	Smart Araneta Coliseum	AG from the East: The Unexpected Concert	
April 25	DJ Alvaro	Valkyrie Nightclub	DJ Alvaro @ Valkyrie Nightclub	
April 25	Various Artists	Marikina Sports Complex	Isang Bayan Para Kay Pacman	
April 25	Stevie Wonder	The Theater at Solaire Resort	By Invitation Only: Stevie Wonder at Solaire	
April 27	Aly & Fila	Chaos Nightclub	Aly & Fila Live in Manila	
April 30	Demi Lovato	SM Mall of Asia Arena	Demi World Tour	
May 1	Various Artists	Boracay	Jungle Circuit Party	
May 1	R3hab	The Palace Pool Club	R3HAB Live in Manila	
May 2	VIXX	SM Mall of Asia Arena	Live FANTASIA in Manila UTOPIA Tour	
May 2	Knife Party	The Palace Pool Club	Knife Party Live in Manila	
May 5	Backstreet Boys	SM Mall of Asia Arena	In a World Like This Tour	
May 7	Katy Perry	Philippine Arena	Prismatic World Tour	
May 8	Owl City	Bonifacio High Street Central Plaza	Owl City Live in Manila	
May 8	Jed Madela	Music Museum	All Request 5	
May 8	Cedric Gervais	Chaos Nightclub	Cedric Gervais Live in Manila	
May 9	Urbandub	Metrotent Convention Center	Urbandub Endless: The Farewell Concert	
May 11	Various Artists	Newport Performing Arts Theater	The 50th Anniversary of British Invasion	
May 13	Peabo Bryson	Newport Performing Arts Theater	Peabo Bryson	
May 14–15	Eden Shireen	SM City Marikina	Eden Shireen Live in Manila	
May 14	JUSTICE	Valkyrie Nightclub	JUSTICE Live in Manila	
May 15–16	Braiden Wood	SM City Marikina	Braiden Wood Live in Manila	
May 16	Various Artists	SM Mall of Asia Concert Grounds	Close Up Forever Summer 2015	
May 16	Various Artists	Greenfield District Parking Grounds	Bob Marley Festival Manila	
May 17	Various Artists	Quirino Grandstand	MTV Music Evolution	
May 19	Alt-J	The Theatre at Solaire Resort	alt-J Live in Manila	
May 22	Vice Ganda	Smart Araneta Coliseum	Vice Gandang Ganda sa Sarili sa Araneta! Edi Wow!!	
May 22	Swanky Tunes	Chaos Nightclub	Swanky Tunes Live in Manila	
May 26	Boyzone	Smart Araneta Coliseum	BZ20 Tour	
May 29	Darren Espanto	SM Mall of Asia Arena	Darren Espanto: Birthday Concert	
May 29	Jason Chen	The Theatre at Solaire Resort	YouTube Sensation: Jason Chen Live in Manila	
May 29	Mark Bautista	Newport Performing Arts Theater	Here Sings Love	
May 30	Various Artists ft. Robin Thicke	Vista Concert Grounds	Dream Fields Music Festival	
May 30	Michael Bolton	The Theater at Solaire Resort	Michael Bolton: Live in Manila	
June 3	RJ Jacinto	RCBC Plaza, Carlos P. Romulo Theater	RJ's Seventieth Birthday Celebration Concert	
June 5	Pentatonix	Smart Araneta Coliseum	On My Way Home Tour	
June 6	RJ Jacinto, Pepe Smith and Ely Buendia	Ynares Sports Arena	Icons of Pinoy Rock	
June 7	Idina Menzel	SM Mall of Asia Arena	Idina Menzel World Tour	
June 11	Various Artists	Chaos Club	#OnePH2015 Concert	
June 12	Sonny Parsons of Hagibis, Gary & Bob of Boyfriends, and Male Rigor of VST & Co.	Grand Ballroom Fairmont Raffles Hotel Makati	Manila Sound Project Dance Concert	
June 13	Daniel Padilla	SM Mall of Asia Arena	Most Wanted	
June 13	Gerald Santos	PICC Plenary Hall	Gerald Santos: Metamorphosis	
June 13	The Company	The Theater at Solaire Resort	The CompanY: 30th Anniversary Concert Celebration	
June 16	Mitch Valdes, Mel Villena, and The Amp Band	Music Museum	Wow Kokoy!: A Benefit Concert for Kokoy Jimenez	
June 26	Fe Delos Reyes	Teatrino	FEbulous!	
July 1	James Ingram	Marriott Hotel Manila Grand Ballroom	James Ingram Live in Manila	
July 3	Enchong Dee	Music Museum	Detour 2015: The Chinito Live in Concert	
July 3	Fe Delos Reyes	Teatrino	FEbulous!	
July 4	Isabella, Robin Nievera, Paolo Valenciano, and Karylle	Music Museum	Next Attraction	
July 4	Various Artists	Metrotent Convention Center	14th Annual White Party Manila	
July 10	Enchong Dee	Music Museum	Detour 2015: The Chinito Live in Concert	
July 11	JC de Vera, Daniel Matsunaga and Matteo Guidicelli	Music Museum	Dreamboys: A Back to Back to Back Triple Threat Concert	
July 12	The Zombies ft. Colin Blunstone and Rod Argent	Grand Ballroom at Solaire Resort	The Zombies Live in Manila	
July 15–16	Bee Gees	Midas Hotel and Casino Tent; The Monastery Nivel Hills, Lahug, Cebu City	Bee Gees Gold: The Tribute	
July 18–19	Twenty One Pilots	Alabang Town Center; TriNoma	Twenty One Pilots Live in Manila	
July 18	The Company with UNEANS	Music Museum	The CompanY in Silver Harmony	
July 21	Chris Brown	SM Mall of Asia Arena	One Hell of a Nite Tour	
July 22–25	Various Artists	CCP Tanghalang Nicanor Abelardo	Andrea Veneracion International Choral Festival Manila 2015	
July 30	Big Bang	SM Mall of Asia Arena	Made World Tour	
July 31	The Used	SM Skydome	The Used Live in Manila	
July 31	Zsa Zsa Padilla	Newport Performing Arts Theater	Beginnings	
August 8	Zedd	SM Mall of Asia Arena	True Colors Tour	
August 9	Jessica Sanchez	City of Dreams Manila	Jessica Sanchez: Up Close and Personal	
August 11	Sheppard	SM Mall of Asia Music Hall	Sheppard Live in Manila	
August 12	All Time Low ft. The Maine	SM Mall of Asia Arena	All Time Low Live in Manila	
August 12	Cody Simpson	Newport Performing Arts Theater	Cody Simpson Live in Manila	
August 13	Echosmith	Samsung Hall	Echosmith	
August 13–14	Planetshakers	Smart Araneta Coliseum	Planetshakers Live in Manila/Quezon City	
August 18	David Foster with Charice Pempengco, Boyz II Men, Natalie Cole, and Ruben Studdard ft. Mark Mabasa	Smart Araneta Coliseum	Hitman: David Foster & Friends Asia Tour 2015	
August 18–20	Walk the Moon	Alabang Town Center; U.P. Town Center Amphitheater; TriNoma Activity Center; Market! Market! Activity Center; Glorietta Activity Center	Talking Is Hard Tour	
August 20	Jesse Lucas	CCP Tanghalang Aurelio Tolentino	Triple Threats: The Composers	
August 23	Ariana Grande	SM Mall of Asia Arena	The Honeymoon Tour	
August 27	Imagine Dragons	SM Mall of Asia Arena	Smoke + Mirrors Tour	
August 30	Dingdong Avanzado	Teatrino	Hitback	
August 30	Andrew McMahon	Hard Rock Café Makati	Andrew McMahon: In the Wilderness	
September 1–6	Mickey Mouse & Friends	Kia Theatre	Disney Live! Mickey's Music Festival	
September 4	Tres Marias (Bayang Barrios, Cooky Chua, and Lolita Carbon)	Music Museum	Tres Marias Live in Concert	
September 5	Against the Current	Metrotent Convention Center	Gravity World Tour	
September 10	The Cascades (John Gummoe) ft. Mark Preston	Edsa Shangri-La Ballroom	The Cascades with Mark Preston	
September 11	The Cascades (John Gummoe) ft. Mark Preston	Newport Performing Arts Theater	The Cascades with Mark Preston	
September 14	Carly Rae Jepsen	Smart Araneta Coliseum	Carly Rae Jepsen Live in Manila	
September 17	Maroon 5	SM Mall of Asia Arena	Maroon 5 World Tour 2015	
September 18–19	Dulce	Music Museum	The Timeless Diva	
September 18	Postmodern Jukebox	Smart Araneta Coliseum	Postmodern Jukebox Live in Manila 2015	
September 18	FameUs and Asha	Ynares Sports Arena	KPOP! Concert	
September 18	Melai Cantiveros	Teatrino	Melai Mo Mag-Concert	
September 18	Martin Nievera	The Theatre at Solaire Resort	Martin, Home at The Theatre	
September 19	Michael Learns to Rock	Smart Araneta Coliseum	Michael Learns to Rock Live in Manila 2015	
September 21	Spandau Ballet	SM Mall of Asia Arena	Soulboys of the Western World Live	
September 24	Vince de Jesus	CCP Tanghalang Aurelio Tolentino	Triple Threats: The Composers	
September 26	Skrillex, A-Trak, Fedde Le Grand, Mija, Vicetone, W&W, Zeds Dead	SM Mall of Asia Concert Grounds	Road to Ultra: Philippines	
October 1–4	Don Moen ft. Lenny LeBlanc	CCF Center; Waterfront Cebu City Hotel & Casino; La Salle Coliseum; Limketkai Mall	Don Moen Live Tour	
October 2	FameUs and Asha	SMX Convention Center Davao	KPOP! Concert	
October 3	Glaiza de Castro	Music Museum	Dreams Never End	
October 3	Charlie Puth	Eastwood Mall	Charlie Puth Live in Manila	
October 8	Lifehouse	SM Mall of Asia Arena	Lifehouse Live in Manila	
October 10, 17, 24, 31	Gloc 9	Music Museum	Ang Kwento ng Makata	
October 14	Earth, Wind & Fire ft. Al McKay All Stars	Grand Ballroom at Hotel Novotel Manila Araneta Center	Earth, Wind & Fire Experience	
October 15	Earth, Wind & Fire ft. Al McKay All Stars	Grand Ballroom at Solaire Resort & Casino	Earth, Wind & Fire Experience	
October 16	Kuh Ledesma ft. Gary Valenciano, Regine Velasquez, Jaya, Tirso Cruz III, Isabella Gonzalez, and Fernando Carrillo	CCF Center	35+ The KUHL Event	
October 22	Rony Fortich	CCP Tanghalang Aurelio Tolentino	Triple Threats: The Composers	
October 24–25	Gary Mullen and The Works	The Theatre at Solaire Resort	One Night of Queen	
October 30	Gipsy Kings	SM Mall of Asia Arena	Gipsy Kings Live in Manila	
October 30–31	Gary Valenciano	Newport Performing Arts Theater	Gary V Presents	
October 31	Various Artists	SM Mall of Asia Concert Grounds	Myx! Mo 2015	
November 6	The Jets	Kia Theatre	30th Year Anniversary Greatest Hits Concert	
November 7	Infinite	SM Mall of Asia Arena	Infinite Effect Live in Manila	
November 8	The Jets	Waterfront Cebu City Hotel & Casino	30th Year Anniversary Greatest Hits Concert	
November 13	Maja Salvador	SM Mall of Asia Arena	Majasty	
November 17	Michael W. Smith	Smart Araneta Coliseum	An Evening with Michael W. Smith	
November 20	Kyla with Jay-R, KZ Tandingan, and Erik Santos	Kia Theatre	Flying High: The 15th Anniversary Concert	
November 21	Sam Smith	SM Mall of Asia Arena	In the Lonely Hour Tour	
November 21	Firehouse, Drop Decay and Franco Suspitsados	Aboitiz Sports Field (Cebu)	Rock and Rebels (presented and sponsored by Harley Davidson Philippines-Cebu branch)	
November 23	Ai-Ai Delas Alas	SM Mall of Asia Arena	For The Love of Mama (for the benefit of the construction of Kristong Hari Church in Commonwealth, Quezon City)	
November 28	Various Artists	Samsung Hall	Bazooka Rocks 4: Royal Rumble!	
November 28	Sam Milby	Kia Theatre	The Milby Way	
November 30	Rick Astley	The Theatre at Solaire	Rick Astley Live in Manila	
December 1	Bryan White	Smart Araneta Coliseum	God Gave Me You Tour	
December 3	Hotdog with Up Dharma Down	PICC Plenary Hall	Hotdog 40 Years	
December 4–5	Sarah Geronimo	Smart Araneta Coliseum	From The Top	
December 7	Bamboo	Newport Performing Arts Theater	Naughty or Nice: A Kickoff to Christmas	
December 7	Air Supply	The Theatre at Solaire	Air Supply 40 Years Tour	
December 10	Clean Bandit	The Palace Pool Club at Bonifacio Global City	Clean Bandit Live in Manila	
December 10	Jessie J	Kia Theatre	Jessie J Live	
December 10	Kamikazee	Smart Araneta Coliseum	Huling Sayaw Kamikazee: The Final Show	
December 11	Gerphil Flores	The Theatre at Solaire	A Golden Treasure	
December 15	Menudo	Smart Araneta Coliseum	Menudo The Tour 2015	
December 18-22	Hi-5	Newport Performing Arts Theater	Hi-5 House of Dreams in Manila	
December 31	Various (incl. Dawin)	Eastwood Mall	Eastwood City New Year Countdown 2016	

=== Cancelled events ===
Concert date(s)	Artist(s)	Venue(s)	Concert title	Reason cited	Reference(s)
February 12	Ai-Ai delas Alas	The Theatre at Solaire	Ai Heart Papa	Problem with the producers	
March 24	Lenny Kravitz	Globe Circuit Event Grounds	Strut: Lenny Kravitz Live in Manila	Schedule conflict	
May 10	Forevermore cast	Sitio Pungayan, Santo Tomas, Tuba, Benguet	#MayForever: A Thanksgiving Concert	Environmental concerns raised regarding the event's venue	
May 10	Sam Smith	SM Mall of Asia Arena	In the Lonely Hour Tour	Due to issue with vocal folds (postponed to November 21, 2015)	
August 8	Jim Brickman	The Theater at Solaire	Jim Brickman: The Platinum Tour	Legal obligations (copyright infringement case)	
August 13	Passion Pit	World Trade Center Manila	Passion Pit Live in Manila	Citing health reasons	
September 27	Kina Grannis	Kia Theatre	Elements Tour	Legal obligations	
December 18	Hardwell	SM Mall of Asia Arena	I Am Hardwell Tour	Mismanagement issues	

== Awarding ceremonies ==
- March 25: Myx Music Awards 2015, organized by myx
- July 11: 2nd MOR Pinoy Music Awards, organized by MOR 101.9
- November 10: 7th Star Awards for Music, organized by the Philippine Movie Press Club (PMPC)
- December 10: 28th Aliw Awards for Live Entertainment

== Deaths ==
- April 1 – Roel Cortez, Filipino singer-songwriter (born 1967)
- April 17 – Gary Ignacio, Filipino singer-songwriter, lead vocalist of the band Alamid (born 1966)
- July 24 – Jimboy Salazar, Filipino singer (born 1973)
- August 2 – Marcelo Ong, member of the Masculados Dos (born 1985)
- October 8 – Elizabeth Ramsey, comedian, singer and actress (born 1931)
- November 2 – Nolyn Cabahug, classical singer (born 1956)
- December 17 – Emil Sanglay, vocalist of folk-rock band Penpen
