= Metro Manila Popular Music Festival =

Philippine festival

The Metro Manila Popular Music Festival (also known as Metropop) was launched by the Popular Music Foundation of the Philippines in 1977 and was held annually from 1978 to 1985. It was "the country's pioneering and once foremost songwriting competition", according to The Philippine Star. Its objective was to promote the advancement of Filipino music, and its chief proponents were journalist Teodoro Valencia and politician Imee Marcos. Over the years, the festival helped launch the careers of many singers and songwriters, among them Freddie Aguilar.

The songwriting competition was originally open to all composers. From the fourth festival onwards, it was divided into professional and amateur sections, to give new songwriters a level playing field without competing with more well-known composers. Radio Philippines Network served as the official broadcast partner for all editions of the song festival. After 1985, the festival was discontinued due to a decline in public interest.

It was later revived as the Metropop Song Festival, which aired on the GMA Network from 1996 to 2003.

== Original Metropop (1978–1985) ==
=== First Metro Manila Popular Music Festival ===
Year	Winners	Finalists
1978	Grand prize: "Kay Ganda ng Ating Musika"; Music and lyrics: Ryan Cayabyab; Interpreter: Hajji Alejandro Second prize: "Pagdating Mo"; Music and lyrics: Nonoy Gallardo; Interpreter: Celeste Legaspi Third prize: "Narito Ako"; Music and lyrics: Nonong Pedero; Interpreter: Maricris Bermont Fourth prize: "Ibig Kong Ibigin Ka"; Music and lyrics: Vic Villafuerte, Rolando Tinio; Interpreter: Anthony Castelo	"Anak"; Music and lyrics: Freddie Aguilar; Interpreter: Freddie Aguilar "Ang Dampa sa Gulod"; Music and lyrics: Joe Reyes; Interpreter: Imelda Papin "Mahal"; Music and lyrics: James Villafuerte; Interpreter: Lejan Lopez "Minsan Pa"; Music and lyrics: Jose Mari Chan; Interpreter: Janet Basco "Ngumiti. . . Tumawa. . . Magsaya. . . Kumanta"; Music and lyrics: Joe Reyes; Interpreter: Cynthia Garcia and the Kabataan "Pag-ibig, Ano Ka Nga Ba"; Music and lyrics: Cecille Marcaida; Interpreter: Nick Gonzales "Pangako"; Music and lyrics: Vic Villafuerte, Rolando Tinio; Interpreter: Rex Demavivas "Saan Ako Patutungo"; Music and lyrics: Jose Ilacad, Jr., Nannette Inventor; Interpreter: Nannette Inventor "Swerte-swerte Lang"; Music and lyrics: Joel Navarro, Rolando Tinio; Interpreter: Joel Navarro "Tayo'y Mga Pinoy"; Music and lyrics: Heber Bartolome; Interpreter: Judas

"Anak" failed to win any of the prizes but went on to become one of the most popular Philippine pop songs ever and to launch the career of Freddie Aguilar. This was right at the beginning of the Original Pilipino Music (OPM) boom, and after this first festival, the singing careers of Hajji Alejandro, Celeste Legaspi, Maricris Bermont, and Anthony Castelo took off. Heber Bartolome's "Tayo'y Mga Pinoy" became a protest anthem, and Ryan Cayabyab's "Kay Ganda ng Ating Musika" became representative of Original Pilipino Music. Emil Mijares was the musical director for this festival. The first grand finals were held at the Folk Arts Theater; RPN-9 served as the official broadcaster for the inaugural season and the succeeding editions of the festival, until 1985.

=== Second Metro Manila Popular Music Festival ===
Year	Winners	Finalists
1979	Grand prize: "Bulag, Pipi at Bingi (Isang Pag-aalay)"; Music and lyrics: Snaffu Rigor; Interpreter: Freddie Aguilar Second prize: "Ewan"; Music and lyrics: Louie Ocampo, Winnie Arrieta; Interpreter: Apo Hiking Society Third prize: "Lupa"; Music and lyrics: Charo Unite, Ernie dela Pena; Interpreter: Rico J. Puno	"Ako ang Nasawi, Ako ang Nagwagi"; Music and lyrics: George Canseco; Interpreter: Dulce "Ang Aking Awitin"; Music and lyrics: Bong Gabriel; Interpreter: Bong Gabriel "Gusto Kong Umawit"; Music and lyrics: Ernie Tagle, Eduardo Mataranas; Interpreter: Ernie Tagle "Itay, Saan Ka Man Naroroon"; Music and lyrics: Chito Sibayan; Interpreter: Chito Sibayan "Laging Buhay ang Buhay"; Music and lyrics: Celia T. Lising; Interpreter: Jacqui Magno "Laruan"; Music and lyrics: Edgar Guerrero; Interpreter: Cynthia Patag "Masdan, Tingnan ang Buhay"; Music and lyrics: Ma. Isabella Mijares; Interpreter: Malou Evidente "Panaginip, Pangarap"; Music and lyrics: Manuel Perlas; Interpreter: God's Ego "Umagang Kay Ganda"; Music and lyrics: Butch Monserrat, Babes Conde, Gryk Ortaleza, Anabelle Lee; Interpreter: Tillie Moreno and Ray-An Fuentes

This time, Freddie Aguilar's interpretation of Snaffu Rigor's composition won the grand prize. However, the biggest pop hit to come out of the Second Metropop was "Ewan", by Apo Hiking Society. Rico J. Puno, already a big star at this time, interpreted the third-place song, which also became a hit. The song "Umagang Kay Ganda" failed to place, but it went on to be used as the main theme of ABS-CBN's now-defunct weekday morning show of the same title, and it also became the campaign song for the presidential bid of Bongbong Marcos in 2022.

=== Third Metro Manila Popular Music Festival ===
Year	Winners	Finalists
1980	Grand prize: "Isang Mundo Isang Awit"; Music and lyrics: Nonong Pedero; Interpreter: Leah Navarro Second prize: "Ikaw, Ako, Tayo (Magkakapatid)"; Music and lyrics: Jose Lozano; Interpreter: New Minstrels Third prize: "Nandoon Na, Nawala Pa"; Music and lyrics:Freddie Lozano; Interpreter: Ray-an Fuentes	"Buhay Ko'y Mayro'ng Ikaw"; Music and lyrics: Felipe Monserrat, Diana Legaspi; Interpreter: Pinky de Leon "Hahanapin Ko"; Music and lyrics: Jose Mari Chan, Jimmy D. Santiago; Interpreter: Anthony Castelo "Kailangan Ko, Kailangan Mo"; Music and lyrics: Gerry Paraiso; Interpreter: Bambi Bonus and Richard Tan "Langit Mo'y Likha Mo Rin"; Music and lyrics: Babes Tolentino; Interpreter: Babes Tolentino, Celso Llarina, Mon Gaskell "Larawan"; Music and lyrics: Thomas Santos; Interpreter: Joel Navarro "Mahalaga"; Music and lyrics: Louie Ocampo; Interpreter: Rene Puno "Nandoon Na, Nawala Pa"; Music and lyrics:Freddie Lozano; Interpreter:Ray-an Fuentes "Nasaan ang Palakpakan"; Music and lyrics: Nonoy Gallardo; Interpreter: Celeste Legaspi "Sa Duyan ng Pag-ibig"; Music and lyrics: Willy Cruz; Interpreter: Passionata "Sa 'Yong Pag-alis"; Music and lyrics: Felipe Monserrat, Jr. Interpreter: Tillie Moreno

Leah Navarro and "Isang Mundo Isang Awit" represented the Philippines and won the bronze prize at that year's Seoul Popular Music Festival. "Ikaw, Ako, Tayo (Magkakapatid)" turned out to be the biggest hit from the Third Metropop.

=== Fourth Metro Manila Popular Music Festival ===
Year	Division	Winners	Finalists
1981	Amateur	Grand prize: "Sino Ang Baliw"; Music and lyrics: Elizabeth Barcelona; Interpreter: Mon Del Rosario Jr. Second prize: "Kahit Konti"; Music and lyrics: Gary Granada; Interpreter: Florante Third prize: "Magsimula Ka"; Music and lyrics: Gines Tan; Interpreter: Leo Valdez	"Aawitin Ko Na Lang"; Music and lyrics: Gary Granada; Interpreter: Bong Gabriel "Hatinggabi (Bawa't Pangarap)"; Music and lyrics: Conrado Ricafort; Interpreter: Boy Camara "Magkaisa"; Music and lyrics: Juan Miguel Salvador; Interpreter: Eugene Villaluz "Pusong "Rock-N-Roll""; Music and lyrics: Felix Chok-Oy Viernes; Interpreter: Pabs Dadivas
1981	Professional	Grand prize: "Babae Ka"; Music and lyrics: Ananias Montano; Interpreter: Something Special Second prize: "Buhay/Pag-asa"; Music and lyrics: Butch Monserrat, Marilyn Villapando; Interpreter: Pol Enriquez Third prize: "Uhaw Na Lupa"; Music and lyrics: Emilio Sanglay; Interpreter: Emil Sanglay at Ang Bagong Pen Pen	"Ang Buhay Ay Ngayon"; Music and lyrics: Benjamin Chua, B.S. Manas; Interpreter: Rene Puno "Insomnia"; Music and lyrics: Eduardo Achacoso, Joseph Olfindo; Interpreter: Joseph Olfindo "Landas"; Music and lyrics: James Villafuerte; Interpreter: Marco Sison "Mr. Musikero"; Music and lyrics: Sonny Nicolas; Interpreter: Sonny Nicolas

Established singers like Florante, Eugene Villaluz, Leo Valdez, and Marco Sison interpreted their first Metropop entries. Emil Sanglay Sonny Nicolas were the only performers who interpreted their own songs.

=== Fifth Metro Manila Popular Music Festival ===
Year	Division	Winners	Finalists
1982	Amateur	Grand prize: "Kahit La La La"; Music and lyrics: Nonoy Tan; Interpreter: Subas Herrero and Noel Trinidad Second prize: "Give Me a Chance"; Music and lyrics: Odette Quesada; Interpreter: Ric Segreto Third prize: "Pag-ibig Mo, Pag-ibig Ko"; Music and lyrics: Ernesto Mendiola; Interpreter: Zander Kahn and Miriam Pantig	"Memories"; Music and lyrics: Paul Melendez; Interpreter: Eileen Espina "Coming Back"; Music and lyrics: Alden Lim and John Joseph Nite; Interpreter: Zoey Zuñiga "Magbabalik Pa Rin Ako"; Music and lyrics: Jorge Sison; Interpreter: The New Minstrels "Buhay Nasa Ating Palad"; Music and lyrics: Julie Lingan and Butch Monserrat; Interpreter: Ray-an Fuentes
1982	Professional	Grand prize: "Isang Dakot"; Music and lyrics: Vehnee Saturno; Interpreter: Sonia Singson Second prize: " (title) " Music and lyrics: Interpreter: Third prize: " (title) " Music and lyrics: Interpreter:	"Don't Deceive Yourself"; Music and lyrics: Alfredo Lozano Jr. Interpreter: Susanna Pichay "Nothing I Want More"; Music and lyrics: Jun Latonio and Tillie Moreno; Interpreters: Louie Reyes and Eugene Villaluz "Ang Aking Kubo"; Music and lyrics: Gary Granada; Interpreter: Florante "What Are You Doing on a Rainy Sunday Morning"; Music and lyrics: Julie Lingan; Interpreters: Ivy Violan and Rico J. Puno "You Made Me Live Again"; Music and lyrics: Nonoy Tan; Interpreter: Janet Basco "Magkaibigan, Nagkaibigan"; Music and lyrics: Topy Lozano; Interpreter: Something Special "Inay Bakit?"; Music and lyrics: Sonny Nicholas; Interpreter: Sonny Nicholas

=== Sixth Metro Manila Popular Music Festival ===
Year	Division	Winners	Finalists
1983	Amateur	Grand prize: "Pain"; Music and lyrics: Alvina Eileen Sy; Interpreter: Martin Nievera Second prize: " (title) " Music and lyrics: Interpreter: Third prize: " (title) " Music and lyrics: Interpreter:	"Laging Mayroong Bukas"; Music and lyrics: June Cerino; Interpreter: Pat Castillo "Kahit Ako'y Mahirap"; Music and lyrics: Mary Rose del Rosario; Interpreter: Mon del Rosario "My Love, My Soul, My Everything"; Music and lyrics: Elizabeth Mendiola; Interpreter: Verni Varga "We're in Love"; Music and lyrics: Mario Lapid and Roberto Rodriguez; Interpreter: Miriam Pantig "Habang May Sikat Pa"; Music and lyrics: Alex Buenaventura and Menche Soloria; Interpreter: The Rainmakers with Millie Beltran "Still Got Love"; Music and lyrics: Alfredo Marbella; Interpreter: Labuyo
1983	Professional	Grand prize: "Till I Met You"; Music and lyrics: Odette Quesada; Interpreter: Kuh Ledesma Second prize: "Ako'y Ako"; Music and lyrics: Vehnee Saturno; Interpreter: Lerma dela Cruz Third prize: "Gabay Mo Ako"; Music and lyrics: Rey Valera; Interpreter: Rey Valera	"Dapithapon"; Music and lyrics: Boy Christopher; Interpreter: Idonnah "Away from You"; Music and lyrics: Boy Katindig; Interpreter: Jennifer Ramos "Kagandahan"; Music and lyrics: Butch Monserrat and Marilyn Villapando; Interpreter: Filipina "Be My Lady"; Music and lyrics: Vehnee Saturno; Interpreter: Pedrito Montaire

=== Seventh Metro Manila Popular Music Festival ===
Year	Division	Winners	Finalists
1984	Amateur	Grand prize: "A Smile in Your Heart"; Music and lyrics: Rene Novelles; Interpreter: Jam Morales Second prize: " (title) " Music and lyrics: Interpreter: Third prize: "Falling in Love Again"; Music and lyrics: Jose Gabriel La Viña; Interpreter: Louie Reyes and Eugene Villaluz	"Falling in Love Again"; Music and lyrics: Jose Gabriel La Vina; Interpreter: Louie Reyes and Eugene Villaluz "Where Did the Heartaches Go"; Music and lyrics: Jose La Vina; Interpreter: Tillie Moreno "Let Us Stay the Way We Used to Be"; Music and lyrics: Al Lopez and Timmi Li Lopez; Interpreter: Al Lopez "Think It Over"; Music and lyrics: Mel Villena and Eleanor Villena; Interpreter: Richard Tann and Maraya "It Used to Be You"; Music and lyrics: Renato Buzon; Interpreter: Jennifer Ramos "I Don't Want You"; Music and lyrics: Reynaldo Cuerdo; Interpreter: Hiyas
1984	Professional	Grand prize: "Salamat, Salamat Musika!"; Music and lyrics: Gary Granada; Interpreter: Nanette Inventor Second prize: "Mga Kulay"; Music and lyrics: Cynthia Guzman; Interpreter: Dulce Third prize: "Part of the Way"; Music and lyrics: June Latonio; Interpreter: Jacqui Magno	"I Got What It Takes"; Music and lyrics: Ray-An Fuentes; Interpreter: Ray-An Fuentes "You Turn Me On"; Music and lyrics: Jograd dela Torre; Interpreter: Chona Cruz and the Platinumates "A Little Smile"; Music and lyrics: Cynthia Guzman; Interpreter: Carla Martinez "Romeo and Juliet"; Music and lyrics: Jessie Jodloman and Toto Mortel; Interpreter: Musikinesis

=== Eighth Metro Manila Popular Music Festival ===
Year	Division	Winners	Finalists
1985	Amateur	Grand prize: "Kinabukasan"; Music and lyrics: Rudy delos Reyes; Interpreter: Joannie Feliciano Second prize: "Musika, Lata, Sipol at La La La"; Music and lyrics: Tess Concepcion; Interpreter: Lea & Gerard Salonga Third prize: "Pilipino Ako (Ito Ang Alay Ko)"; Music and lyrics: June Sta. Maria – Larry Tan & Nina Florentino; Interpreter: Veronica	"Pag-Ibig Sa Ating Musika"; Music and lyrics: Bobby Bonus; Interpreter: Nailclippers "Ang Sinisisi"; Music and lyrics: Alejandra Ramos; Interpreter: Gloria Belen "Come Be a Part of My Song"; Music and lyrics: Ed Nepumoceno – Edward Granadosin; Interpreter: Iwi Laurel "Ito Na Nga"; Music and lyrics: Angelica Lim; Interpreter: Robby Miguel
1985	Professional	Grand prize: "Pag-Asa ng Mundo"; Music and lyrics: Alvina Aileen Sy; Interpreter: Ivy Violan Second prize: "You're My Home"; Music and lyrics: Odette Quesada; Interpreter: Odette Quesada Third prize: "Anting-Anting"; Music and lyrics: Emil Sanglay; Interpreter: Emil Sanglay at ang Pen-Pen	"Ani-a Ako Ang Imong Higala"; Music and lyrics: Philip Abrogar; Interpreter: Philip Abrogar "Kuwarta, Kuwarta"; Music and lyrics: Sunny Ilacad; Interpreter: Vincent Daffalong "Manalig Ka"; Music and lyrics: Joel Navarro - N. Arnel de Pano; Interpreter: Dio Marco "Sa Ating Daigdig"; Music and lyrics: Sonny Angeles; Interpreter: Manilyn Reynes

== Metropop Song Festival (1996–2003) ==
The Metropop Song Festival (also known as Metropop) was an annual music festival that served as a relaunch of the original competition, running from 1996 until 2003. It was broadcast on the GMA Network. The festival promoted non-mainstream musicians such as Gary Granada and Angelo Villegas, and it boosted the singing careers of Jaya and Carol Banawa, who participated as interpreters.

Another associated event, called Metropop Young Singers (later renamed Metropop Star Search) ran at the same time. Unlike the main festival, this event served as a talent competition for young aspiring singers. The contestants were judged based on their interpretation of existing songs. The most notable participant was Melanie Calumpad, who came third in 1997 and later returned as an interpreter for the actual song festival in 2003, under her stage name Kyla. She went on to have a successful career in music and competed as an interpreter for the winning songs at the Himig Handog and Philippine Popular Music Festival song contests.

=== Metropop Song Festival winners ===
1996:

- "Sometimes You Just Know"; composers: Danny Tan, Edith Gallardo; interpreter: Jaya (grand prize)
- "Shine"; composer: Trina Belamide; interpreter: Ima Castro (recording only) (second prize)
- "Aawitin Ko, Ang Awit Mo"; composer: Greg Caro; interpreter: Rannie Raymundo (third prize)

1997:

- "Para Sa Inyo, 'Tong Kanta Kong 'To"; composer and interpreter: Gideon "Jungee" Marcelo (grand prize)
- "If I Could"; composer: Dodjie Simon; interpreter: Lloyd Umali (second prize)
- "Delikado, Delikadesa"; composer: Soc Villanueva; interpreter: Judith Banal (third prize)

1998:

- "Mabuti Pa Sila"; composer and interpreter: Gary Granada (grand prize)
- "Bring Back the Times"; composer: Eunice Saldaña; interpreter: Dessa (second prize)
- "You Make Me Smile"; composer: Rica Arambulo; interpreter: Carol Banawa (third prize)

1999:

- "Can't Stop Loving You"; composer: Dodjie Simon; interpreter: Lani Misalucha and the Noisy Neighbors (grand prize)
- "Tayo Pa Rin"; composer: Soc Villanueva; interpreter: Zebedee Zuniga (second prize)
- "Clara's Eyes"; composer: Joey Benin; interpreter: Side A (third prize)

2000:

- "Forever and a Day"; composer: Angelo Villegas; interpreter: Rachel Alejandro (grand prize)
- "Paano Na?"; composer: Arnold Reyes; interpreter: Bituin Escalante (second prize)
- "Ganyan Ako"; composer: Vehnee Saturno; interpreter: Jeremiah (third prize)

2001

- "Pag-Uwi"; composers: Louie Ocampo and Joey Ayala; interpreter: Martin Nievera (grand prize)
- "Kawikaan"; composers: Laverne Ducut and Catherine Carlos; interpreter: Cynthia Alexander (second prize)
- "Heaven Sent"; composer: Dennis Garcia; interpreter: Ella Mae Saison with the Saisons and Friends; music arranger: Emil Mayor (third prize)

2003:

- "Malayo Man, Malapit Din"; composer and interpreter: Bayang Barrios (grand prize)
- "Pretend That I Don't Love You"; composer: Mike Villegas; interpreter: Cookie Chua (second prize)
- "Buti Na Lang"; composer: Jonathan Manalo; interpreter: Kyla (third prize)

=== Metropop Star Search winners ===
1997:

- Jonard Yanzon – "I Believe I Can Fly" (champion)
- Carmela Cuneta – "Di Ko Na Kaya" (second place)
- Melanie Calumpad – "Somewhere Over the Rainbow" (third place)

1998:

- Champagne Morales – "Journey to the Past" (champion)
- Roxanne Barcelo – "Part of Your World" (second place)
- Xaxa Manalo – "Bakit Pa?" (third place)

1999:

- Miles Poblete – "Anak ng Pasig" (champion)
- Idelle Martinez – "...Baby One More Time" (second place)
- Jericson Matias – "Stay the Same" (third place)

2000:

- Anna Katrina Lara – "On the Wings of Love" (champion)
- Camile Velasco – "How Could an Angel Break My Heart" (second place)
- Jacky Garcia – "I Don't Wanna Miss a Thing" (third place)

== See also ==
- Himig Handog
- Philippine Popular Music Festival
