= Ang Bandang Shirley =

Filipino pop rock band

- Also known as: Shirley
- Origin: Quezon City, Philippines
- Genres: Indie rock; Post-rock; Alternative pop; Punk rock
- Years active: 2003–2025
- Label: Wide Eyed Records Manila
- Past members: Owel Alvero; Heidi Pascual; Jing Gaddi; Enzo Zulueta; Zig Rabara; Emmanuel Aguila; Debb Acebu; Selena Salang; Joe Fontanilla; Miggy Abesamis; Kathy Gener; Paolo Arciga
- Website: angbandangshirley.bandcamp.com

Ang Bandang Shirley (or Shirley) was a Filipino pop rock band which started in 2003, with Owel Alvero and Emmanuel (Ean) Aguila as the original members. With the eventual addition of other band members—Joe Fontanilla, Zig Rabara, Jing Gaddi, Selena Salang, Heidi Pascual, Kathy Gener, Enzo Zulueta, and Debb Acebu—Shirley is seen by peers and younger artists as one of the most influential groups in the Filipino independent music scene, being dubbed as "masters of romantic songcraft".

The band's name came from one of the b-side songs of fellow Filipino band, Eraserheads, entitled "Shirley". According to Alvero in an interview, the song was chosen to represent their group as the lyrics of its chorus pretty much reflect their music and their personalities. "Ang Bandang" was affixed not only to put the band's name on top of any list arranged alphabetically, but also to add spunk to its sound.

As many feature writers quite unanimously put it, Shirley's complex yet relatable music can be described as having "catchy" beats and "infectious" tunes while still having that ability to sing one's heart out and convey one's innermost feelings, may it be due to a heartbreak or a surge of infatuation. Lyrics laced with colorful and empathetic metaphors, live audience and record listeners are often left more in touch with their feelings after having listened to a song or two.

Shirley has released three full albums since their conception, Themesongs (2008), Tama Na Ang Drama (2012), and Favorite (2017). They usually perform live in local bars, such as Route 196 and Mow's Bar in Quezon City and Saguijo Cafe in Makati City.

Before disbanding in 2025, the band used to be under independent label Wide Eyed Records Manila; previously, the band was with Terno Recordings.

== History ==
Owel Alvero and Ean Aguila came together in December 2003, around the time Eraserheads disbanded, in an audition for a class project at the University of the Philippines in Diliman, but they did not form the band just yet during this time. It was Alvero, together with Rabara, Gaddi, and Fontanilla who started the band that is now known as Ang Bandang Shirley. Not long after, they took in more people as part of their group. This includes Aguila and Salang, who are mainstays of the band until today. Other additions are Pascual and Gener, the former eventually leaving the band and the latter becoming the band's manager. This collaboration translated to an evolution of their sound. By 2006, they have grown to an eight-member group, all of whom came from UP Diliman. This group consequently gave birth to their first album, Themesongs in 2008.

From this point up to 2012, when they released their second album, Tama Na Ang Drama, the band relayed in an interview how each member grew as different persons and how they had to transition to varying phases in their individual lives. Some of the members got married and had children. Pascual had to leave the band to focus on parenthood and other aspects of her life. Others continued to learn more techniques and became more exposed to various influences. Together with these changes, the remaining members adapted by putting a spin to their music, making their sound less saccharine and more courageous and daring. Furthermore, while most of the songs in Themesongs were primarily penned by Alvero and Aguila, Tama Na Ang Drama introduced the works of other members, making the album's sound more eclectic.

In 2015, Gaddi retired from the band to focus on his professional career as a lawyer. This made way for the addition of Enzo Zulueta as the new bass guitar player of the group.

Since the release of their second album, the band has performed live on a number of stages in gigs and music festivals, not only locally but also abroad (see Notable Performances). Some of their songs have also been used in various independently-produced films, such as "Endo", "Ang Nawawala (What Isn't There)", and most recently, "I'm Drunk, I Love You". The band also covered a Sharon Cuneta track, Takot Akong Umibig, for the film, "Every Room is a Planet". Theme Song, the carrier single of their first album, has been used in the Cornetto Disc TVC in 2013. They have also appeared in the TVC and print ads of FWD Insurance.

On March 25, 2017, Ang Bandang Shirley released their new album, Favorite, which includes tracks previously released as singles and played live, such as Siberia, Umaapaw, Karagatan, and Karamay. In their third album, as with the previous two, all the members contributed in terms of songwriting. Out of all the tracks, Alvero wrote seven songs, including one that was co-written with Paolo Arciga of The Strangeness. Aguila, the band's most prolific songwriter and the person behind the cult classics and "mushpit" favorites, Nakauwi Na, 'Di Na Babalik, and Umaapaw, penned six. The ladies, Salang and Gener, contributed one song each to the record. In producing the album, the band did not just single-handedly take care of the technical aspects of the songs. Rather, Favorite became a collaborative project with the help of other talented and skillful musicians: Migi de Belen of Nights of Rizal, "The Ringmaster" Francis Lorenzo, Mario Consunji of the Big Hat Gang, Joon Guillen of Modulogeek, and Mikey Amistoso of Ciudad.

It was also during the latest album launch that Salang announced her temporary departure to make way for personal endeavors.

Debb Acebu was officially announced, after having sessioned for the band several times in the past year, as the band's new lead vocalist during the debut of their Alam Mo Ba? (Ang Gulo) music video on May 19, 2018, at 123 Block in Mandaluyong. Acebu was previously from the Cebu-based band, Honeydrop.

On February 19, 2025, Shirley announced their disbandment in a brief statement on their social media platforms. The decision follows the resurfacing of 2017 sexual harassment allegations involving several band members, with new information in early 2025 implicating Aguila. In both instances, those involved released individual statements taking accountability for their actions. Aguila subsequently chose to leave the band, accepting full responsibility for his behavior, after which the remaining members decided to disband.

== Notable performances ==
=== Siklab Bayan ===
Various Filipino artists and musicians whose cultural influence span across generations came together in solidarity in front of the People Power Monument in EdSA on November 30, 2016, to protest against the hurried burial of the late dictator, Ferdinand Marcos, at the Libingan ng mga Bayani. The likes of Jim Paredes of Apo Hiking Society, Noel Cabangon, Moonstar88, Bayang Barrios, Gary Granada, Bullet Dumas, and Cheats graced the stage along with Ang Bandang Shirley. Visual artist, Toym Imao, and spoken word artists likewise showed their support through their work and performances.

=== Kia Beats Music Festival ===
As a sign of support to local artists and musicians, Philippine's exclusive distributor of Kia vehicles, Columbian Autocar Corporation (CAC), launched Kia Beats Music Festival, a 2-part concert series featuring local bands and musicians, Ang Bandang Shirley, Farewell Fair Weather, Motherbass, and Rico Blanco in collaboration with the 48-piece Metro Manila Concert Orchestra (MMCO) to deliver a full orchestral arrangement of the bands' and musicians' original songs. This was held at the Kia Theatre in the Araneta Center in Cubao on September 9–10, 2016.

On Day 1 of Kia Beats Music Festival, Shirley joined the MMCO onstage to deliver a one of a kind rendition of gig crowd favorites, Tama Na Ang Drama, Siberia, Umaapaw, and Nakauwi Na. The band also debuted one of their new songs, Karagatan, which is part of their newest album, Favorite (2017).

=== Rockin' the Region in Singapore ===
In June 2011, Ang Bandang Shirley worked up the stage at the Esplanade Outdoor Theatre in Singapore as they graced their Filipino and non-Filipino fans with their popular songs, Patintero/Habulan/Larong Kalye, Taksil, and Nakauwi Na. The band also played one of their hit songs, 'Di Na Babalik with an English translation. They also covered Broken Social Scene's 7/4 Shoreline in the same gig.

== Members ==
=== Past members ===
- Emmanuel Aguila (guitar, vocals)
- Debb Acebu (lead vocals)
- Selena Salang (lead vocals)
- Joe Fontanilla (guitar, vocals)
- Paolo Arciga (bass)
- Miggy Abesamis (drums)
- Kathy Gener (vocals, manager)
- Enzo Zulueta (bass)
- Jing Gaddi (bass)
- Heidi Pascual (keyboards, synthesizer)
- Zig Rabara (drums)
- Owel Alvero (guitar, vocals)

== Discography ==
=== Albums ===
- Themesongs (2008)
- Tama Na Ang Drama (2012)
- Favorite (March 2017)

=== EPs ===
- Alam Mo Ba? (Ang Gulo) (2018)

=== Singles ===
- "Theme Song" (2009)
- "Nakauwi Na" (2015)
- "Umaapaw (2016)
- "Siberia" (2016)
- "Favorite" (2017)
- "Alam Mo Ba? (Ang Gulo)" (2018)
- "Isip at Kamalayan" (2022)

=== Music videos ===
	Year	Director
Sa Madaling Salita		
Theme Song	2008	Kathy Gener
Iyong	2013	Ramon De Veyra
Tama Na Ang Drama	2015	Joanne Cesario
Umaapaw	2016	Kathy Gener Shinji Manlangit
Siberia	2016	Kathy Gener
Maginhawa	2017	Patrick Vinalay Patrick Visenio
Alam Mo Ba? (Ang Gulo)	2018	JP Habac
