= Hajji Alejandro =

Filipino singer and actor (1954–2025)

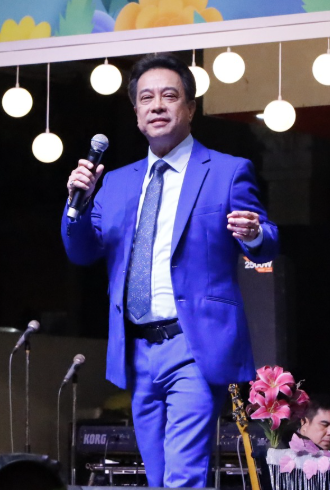
- Alejandro performing in Bayambang in 2024

Background information
- Born: Angelito Toledo Alejandro; December 26, 1954; Manila, Philippines
- Died: April 21, 2025 (aged 70)
- Genres: Pop
- Occupations: Musician, actor
- Instrument: Vocals
- Years active: 1973–2025
- Formerly of: Circus Band (1973–1976); Lovelife

Angelito "Hajji" Toledo Alejandro (Tagalog: [ˈhadʒi ʔɐlɛˈhandɾɔ]; December 26, 1954 – April 21, 2025) was a Filipino singer and actor who was a major pop star in the 1970s and 1980s.

One of the first original Pilipino music (OPM) icons, Alejandro's singing career started from being a member of the Circus Band within almost three years, along with Basil Valdez who had discovered him, before going solo in 1976. At that time, he was dubbed the original "Kilabot ng mga Kolehiyala" (Note: "Kilabot ng mga Kolehiyala" is translated variously: scourge of coeds (young female students); college girls' dream boy.)

Alejandro interpreted the song "Kay Ganda ng Ating Musika", which eventually won grand prizes at the first editions of the Metro Manila Popular Music Festival and the International Seoul Song Festival in South Korea in 1978. He was also best known for songs, "Tag-Araw, Tag-ulan" and "Panakip-butas" (both adaptations of foreign songs), as well as "May Minamahal" and "Nakapagtataka."

== Early life and education ==
Angelito was born in Manila on December 26, 1954, to Edgardo Alejandro and Aida Toledo. He was the oldest of two sons from a family which had been involved in music. His relatives in the mother side consisted of professional musicians mostly playing percussions, including his uncle, 1950s popular singer Paquito Toledo. His nickname, "Hajji", came from the song "Hajji Baba" by Nat King Cole.

Alejandro took a management course at the Ateneo de Manila University, where he was discovered. However, he left college after his second year to concentrate on his music career.

== Career ==
=== Music career ===
==== With the Circus Band and Lovelife ====
Alejandro was the youngest member of the Circus Band, one of the popular music groups in the 1970s, where his career began. The band also produced other soloists, including Tillie Moreno, Pat Castillo, and balladeer Basil Valdez.

Alejandro once recalled that Valdez, an Ateneo alumni, "discovered" him and recruited him to join the band following his performance at the university with his classmates from San Beda.

He had been singing professionally since June 1973, at the time he was an Ateneo freshman, when he was paid to sing "If You Don't Know Me By Now" by Harold Melvin & the Blue Notes, with the band at the Wells Fargo nightclub on Dewey (now Roxas) Boulevard. Every night, he received the sum of ₱35 for his acts. During almost three years with the group, Alejandro recorded at least four albums with them.

After the breakup of the Circus Band, Alejandro, Valdez and Moreno formed a band for a while, named Lovelife.

==== Solo career ====
Alejandro went solo in 1976 with the help of lyricist Willy Cruz, then musical director of the rival band, the Ambivalent Crowd, who would be his mentor. He had worked as a singer for Cruz's advertising jingles. Alejandro met Cruz who had left Vicor Records and became the president of the upstart JEM Records, where the former became one of the first signed artists.

Among his first hit singles were "Panakip-butas," (Note: "Panakip Butas" or "Panakip-butas" is a Filipino slang for a standby boyfriend.) an adaptation of the 5th Dimension's "Worst That Could Happen"; and "Tag-araw, Tag-ulan," that of the Bee Gees' "Charade". In 2018, Alejandro shared in a concert that "May Minamahal" was the first song he recorded and became a hit.

In 1977, his first album, Hajji, was released. To promote this, he did a nationwide campus tour which subsequently earned him the moniker, the original "Kilabot ng mga Kolehiyala."

Alejandro was later introduced by Cruz to (now National Artist for Music) Ryan Cayabyab, also from the same recording label. He interpreted "Kay Ganda ng Ating Musika", composed by Cayabyab, for the inaugural Metro Manila Popular Music Festival (Metropop) in 1978—his first time to join a singing competition—winning the grand prize. Later that year, Alejandro and Cayabyab represented the country in the first International Music Festival in Seoul, South Korea, where they took the Grand Prix for the song, and Alejandro the Best Singer. That Filipino song became the first to win the highest award in an international song competition.

Alejandro went on hiatus since the late 1980s as he went to the United States for a non-showbiz venture. The hiatus ended prior to the end of his business in early 1990s, as he had his first weekend concert with his daughter Rachel at the Music Museum.

In his later years, he performed particularly for Filipinos abroad, with Rachel in their shows; as well as with the group collectively known as The OPM Hitmakers—also composed of Rey Valera, Marco Sison, Nonoy Zuñiga and Rico J. Puno.

=== Acting career ===
His popularity as a pop singer led Regal Films to sign him up to do movies. His initial movie appearance—"Panakip-butas" with Nora Aunor and Trixia Gomez, based on one of his hit songs—became a box office success. However, he later decided to leave the movie industry and to focus more on his singing career, as he felt uncomfortable doing mature scenes on the first shooting day for another movie.

He was also involved in musical theater plays.

=== Business career ===
Leaving his music career, Alejandro moved to Los Angeles, California, where he stayed since 1987, and set up a restaurant along Melrose Avenue with his wife, Rio Diaz. However, Diaz decided to return to the Philippines after about three years. Meanwhile, the business being managed by Alejandro was affected by recession, and eventually closed. He sold his house and likewise went home in 1992.

== Political views ==
In 1986, Alejandro and his then-partner Rio Diaz campaigned for the reelection of president Ferdinand Marcos in the 1986 snap election, with the two continuing to support him even after his overthrow in the People Power Revolution.

== Personal life and death ==
Alejandro was married twice. His first wife was Myrna Demauro, with whom he had two daughters, Barney and singer Rachel.

The second was beauty queen and actress Rio Diaz; they were likewise separated after Diaz went back to the Philippines from the United States around 1990. They had a son, Delara drummer Ali. Diaz died of colorectal cancer in October 2004.

Alejandro was in a long-term relationship with former New Minstrels (another 1970s music group) singer Alynna Velasquez from 1998. In March 2025, Velasquez revealed that he had been diagnosed with stage IV colorectal cancer. He died from the disease on April 21, at the age of 70. His cremated remains were later interred at the Heritage Park after a one-day private wake which was held two days later.

== Discography ==
=== Albums ===
- Hajji (first album, 1977)
- 18 Greatest Hits
- Collection
- Pagbabalik (1992)
- Hajji Alejandro 25: The Silver Anniversary Album (launched May 30, 1999) — released by BMG Records Pilipinas; contains 14 re-recorded songs.

=== Singles ===
- "Kay Ganda ng Ating Musika" – composed by Ryan Cayabyab; grand prize winners at the inaugural Metro Manila Popular Music Festival and at the first International Seoul Song Festival in South Korea, both in 1978.
- "Panakíp Butas" – composed by Willy Cruz and J. Webb; Tagalog adaptation of "Worst That Could Happen" by the 5th Dimension and Jimmy Webb.
- "Tag-araw, Tag-ulan" – Tagalog adaptation of "Charade" by the Bee Gees.
- "May Minamahal" – composed by Willy Cruz; later covered by his daughter Rachel.
- "Nakapagtataka" – composed by Jim Paredes; later covered by his daughter Rachel and by Sponge Cola in 2006.
- "Ang Lahat ng Ito'y Para Sa'yo" – composed by Nonong Pedero; performed by him with Rachel and Cayabyab in a 1989 episode of Ryan Ryan Musikahan.
- "Di Ba Puwede" – composed by Rey Valera
- "If I were Man Enough" – composed by Butch Monserrat
- "Ikaw at ang Gabi"

== See also ==
- Basil Valdez
- Jim Paredes
- Tillie Moreno
- Ryan Cayabyab
- Ariel Rivera
