= Emil Mijares =

Filipino jazz musician (1935–2007)

- Born: March 16, 1935; Roxas City, Capiz
- Origin: Philippines
- Died: October 15, 2007 (aged 72)
- Genres: jazz
- Occupations: musician, composer, arranger, bandleader, producer
- Instruments: vibraphone, piano
- Years active: 1950s - 2007

Emil Mijares (March 16, 1935 – October 15, 2007) was a Filipino jazz musician.

Mijares was born in 1935, the son of Emilio Montilla Mijares, Sr. and O Belo Mijares, and grew up in Roxas City in the province of Capiz. He emerged in the 1950s as a jazz vibist and pianist, and was a musical director on Filipino television, as well as a composer, arranger, bandleader and producer.

Known as the "grandfather of Philippines jazz", Mijares was the musical director for several Metro Manila Popular Music Festivals and won the Aliw Award for best jazz performer (1983) and best musical director (1985). In 2004 and 2006 respectively, Mijares was granted a Lifetime Achievement Award each by Los Angeles–based Filipino-American magazine Celebrity Chronicle and the Jazz Society of the Philippines USA (2006).

Mijares’ career continued until the late 1980s when he left the Philippines and migrated to the United States. He remained active musically in the Los Angeles area until he was taken ill in 2007 and died at the age of 72. In his honor, the Jazz Society of the Philippines in the United States named their annual scholarship grant program the Emil Mijares Scholarship.

== Other sources ==
- "Tribute album for Emil Mijares, 'Grandfather of Pinoy jazz' out in US soon". GMA News Online.
- "Reviews". www.jazzsociety.ph.
- http://www.pinoyinamerica.com/?p=371
