= Emil Sanglay =

Filipino singer-songwriter (1953–2015)

Emil Sanglay (born Emilio Estrella Sanglay Jr.; January 7, 1953 – December 17, 2015) was a Filipino singer-songwriter known for his experimental music and innovation towards ethnic pop music in 1978. Emil Sanglay was also a neo-ethnic musical artist in the Philippines.

== Early life ==
Born in Manila, Philippines, he was the youngest of seven children. Sanglay's father, Emilio Rilloraza Sanglay, was a businessman/lawyer and his mother, Flora Carriaga Estrella, was a daughter of the late ex-mayor Alipio Gutierrez Estrella of Bautista, Pangasinan was a retired educator.

Sanglay studied chemical engineering at Mapúa Institute of Technology and took Advanced Education for Music Teachers and Musicians at the University of the Philippines Diliman College of Music. Sanglay has taught music at every level of elementary and high school at Christ Baptist Academy and was head of the Screening Department in Music of Christ Baptist Church.

== Career ==
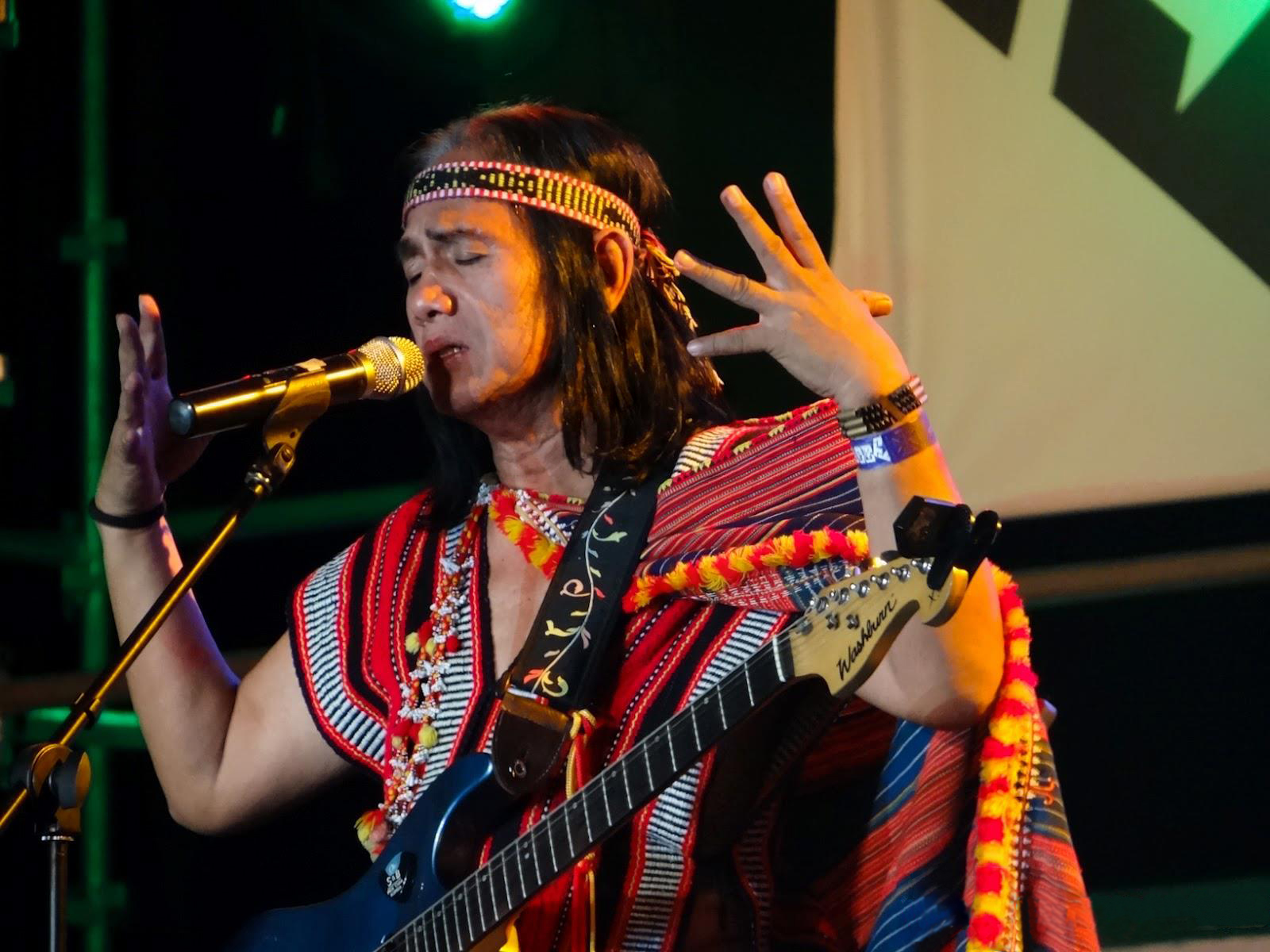
Sanglay with "Pen-Pen Neo-Ethnic Rock Band" at Dutdutan XII

In the early 1970s, Sanglay was the bass and lead guitarist of Acid Tree Rock Band l & ll and Silhouette Band, and served as a choir director of FYM Choral Group at the Sta. Mesa Church in Manila, chord editor of Jingle Chordbook Magazine, researcher, author, and testing officer of Technical Education and Skills Development Authority for Overseas Performing Artists, and Philchime (Philippine Chamber of Industry in Music and Entertainment). Sanglay's professional music career started when Vicor Records released his song "Pen-Pen de Sarapen" in 1978. He was a recording artist for Ivory Music and Video(formerly Ivory Records), Cultural Center of the Philippines artist (Outreach and Exchange Program) and one of the main cast of Lapu-lapu, a multilingual opera by Toto Gentica in 1997. Sanglay died of cardiac arrest in Baguio on December 17, 2015.

Emil Sanglay received multiple awards for his compositions and singing. Together with Sanglay's group Penpen, they had been credited for many innovations and are considered experimentalists; Penpen and Sanglay are well known for their musical style that integrates the sounds of Filipino indigenous instruments with modern pop music.

Most of the Filipino indigenous instruments Sanglay was known for using in his live performances were: "Diwdiw-as", "Tonggatong", "Gangsa", "Gabbang", "Kubing", "Bungkaka", "Maraak", "Tambur", "Patting" or the bamboo guitar of the Cordillerans and the carabao horn "tambuli", stones, frog sounds, rain stick and birds caller. Sanglay and his band Bagong Penpen also used modern, Asian and Vedic instruments in his music, such as the electric guitar, bass guitar, flute, conga, djembe, sitar, tabla, mrdanga, harp, violin, marimba, Chinese gong, udu, doumbek, keyboard synthesizers and drums.

== Death ==
Sanglay suffered a cardiac arrest on December 12, 2015, in Baguio while performing on stage at the Baguio Convention Center; he was in comatose for 5 days and then died on December 17, 2015.

== Affiliations and memberships ==
- Southern Tagalog Alliance for Culture & the Arts (formerly known as KANDILI: Kalinangan ng Diwa ng Lipi Art council) - founder
- Filipino Composer's Development & Cooperative (FILCOMDEC) - chairman, Research & Development
- Filipino Society of Composers, Authors & Publishers Inc. (FILSCAP) - member
- Bagong Penpen - founder, composer, bandleader and arranger
- Asosasyon ng Musikong Pilipino (AMP) - former Vice-President
- Organisasyon ng Pilipinong Mang-aawit (OPM) - member

== Accolades ==
- "ASNA Awards: Most Outstanding Pangasinenses" honoree for the field of Music 2015
- One of the Top 100 semi-finalists in the USA Song Writing Contest 2001
- 1st Awit Awards nominee for two (2) original compositions:
  - “Pinagpalang Lupa” for Best Rock Composition & Best Rock-Vocal & Instrumental Performance
  - “Sabungan” for Best Folk-Pop Vocal Performance
- Number 3 in the TOP 7 Finalists of the aborted 9th METROPOP Music Festival 1986 (Professional Division) as a result of February EDSA Revolution Entry Song: "Pinagpalang Lupa"
- Winner in the 8th METRO MANILA POPULAR MUSIC FESTIVAL 1985 (Professional Division) Entry Song: “Anting-anting”
- One of the Top 12 Semi-Finalists in the 5th METROPOP Music Festival 1982 (Professional Division) The only participant w/two(2) songs in the Top 12 semi-finalists. Entry song: "May Dahilan Din" & "Bilanggo"
- Philippine Representative to the 2nd ASEAN Song Festival 1982 - Ethnic Division, Bangkok, Thailand
- Winner in the 4th METROPOP Music Festival 1981 - Professional Division. Entry song: “Uhaw Na Lupa”
- One of the Top 60 semi-finalists in the Likha-Awit Pambata 1979. Entry song: "Awit-Pambata"
