= Tongatong =

Philippine percussion instrument

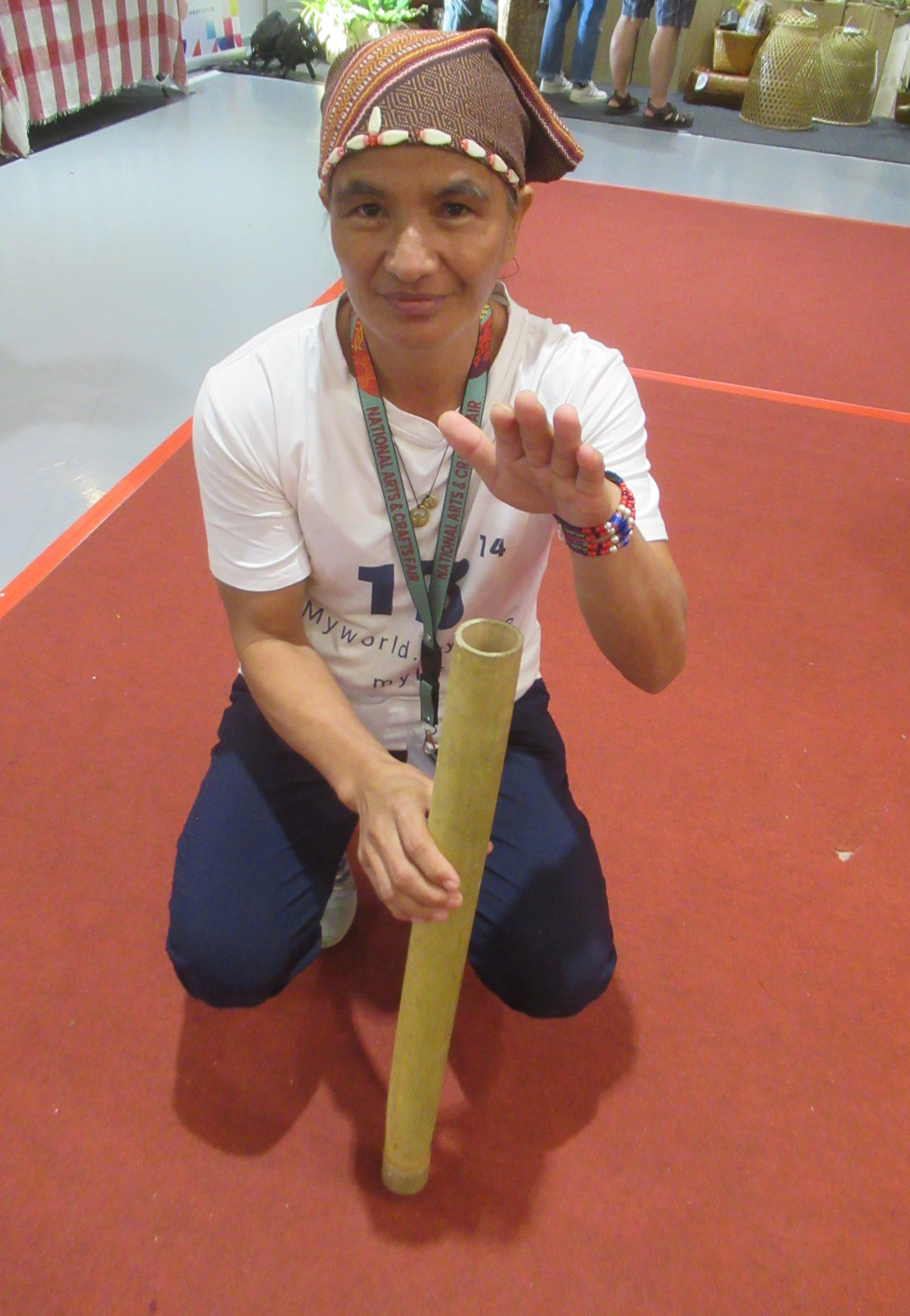
Tongatong played by Kalinga people

A tongatong is a percussion instrument made of various lengths of bamboo, which is found in the Kalinga province of the Philippines. It is played by hitting it against the earth. Traditionally, the tongatong is used by the people of Kalinga to communicate with spirits, particularly as part of healing rituals. In modern times, it is also played recreationally as part of an ensemble.
