= Reo Brothers =

Filipino band

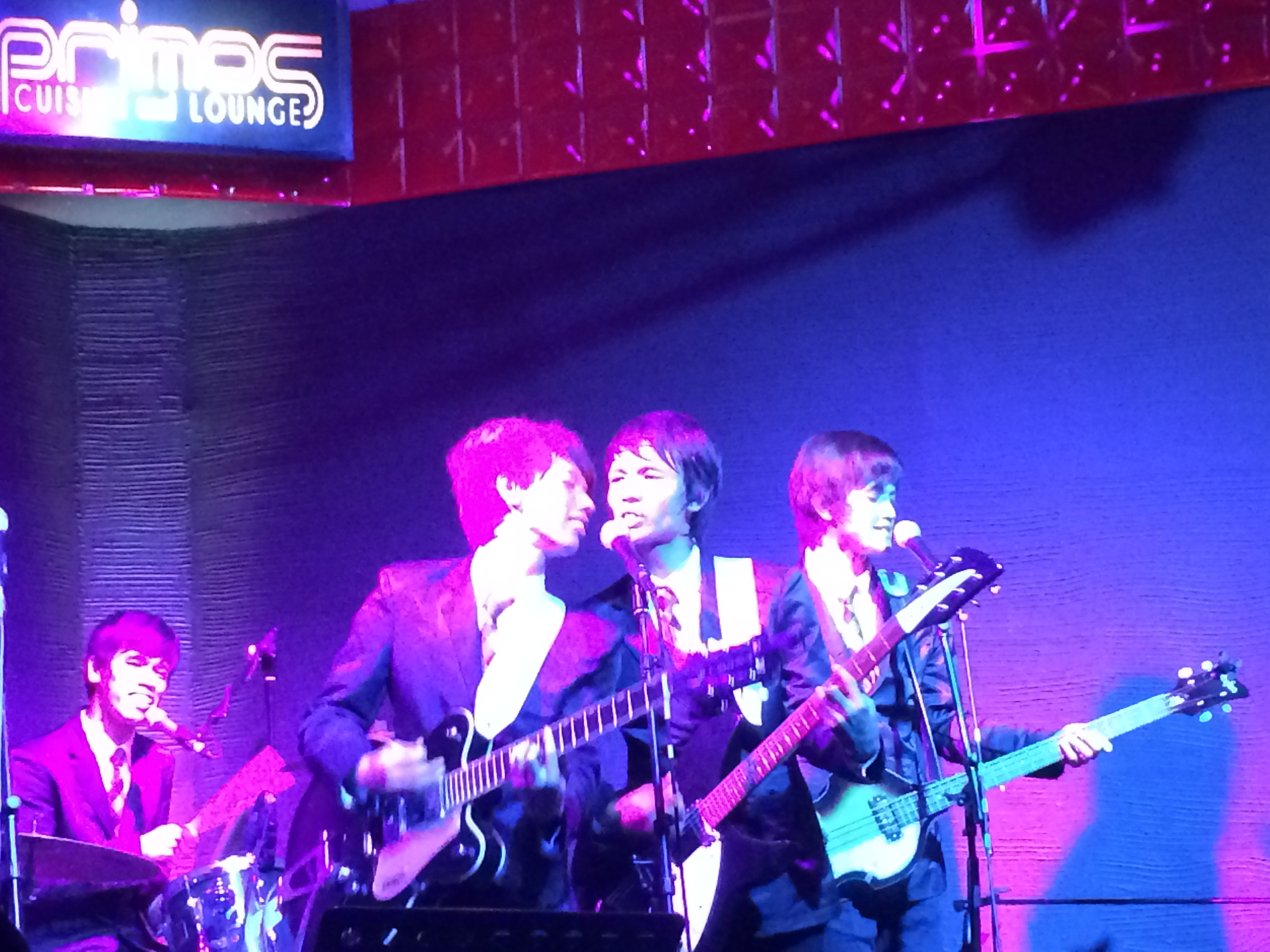
- Reo Brothers in 2014 (from left to right : Reno, Ronjoseph, Raymart, & Ralph)

Background information
- Origin: Tacloban, Philippines
- Genres: Rock, disco, soft rock, pop, pop rock
- Years active: 2009–present
- Label: Star Music
- Members: Reno Evasco Otic – born on September 25, 1989 (age 36); Ronjoseph Evasco Otic – born on February 20, 1992 (age 34); Raymart Evasco Otic – born on February 27, 1994 (age 32); Ralph Evasco Otic – born on November 18, 1996 (age 29); Roy Mark Evasco Otic – born on November 14, 1999 (age 26)
- Website: Reo Brothers on Facebook

The Reo Brothers is a Filipino rock band composed of five brothers. The band performs renditions of music from the 1950s to the 1970s, that of The Beatles, The Beach Boys, The Dave Clark Five, Bee Gees, Gary Lewis & the Playboys, The Lettermen, America, The Ventures, VST & Co., and other prominent bands of the era. The band grew in popularity after they performed at the ABS–CBN Christmas Special 2013 in the Araneta Coliseum. The Reo Brothers band received the only standing ovation that night.

== Background ==
=== Formation and early years in Tacloban (2005-2013) ===
In 2005, lead vocalist Ronjoseph Otic made drums from tin cans covered with potato-chip bags and started teaching himself to play the drums. After learning to play the drums, he then mastered playing the guitar and taught these skills to his three siblings, Ralph, Reno, and Raymart. They started playing OPM songs and songs inspired by their father's collection of 1950s to 1970s songs by The Beatles, Bee Gees, Cliff Richard, etc.

In October 2008, Roger David Gabero Bichachi—an employee of the mayor's office of Tacloban and a member of PGBI (Philippine Guardians Brotherhood Inc), Tacloban Chapter—saw them jam with their friends, singing and playing their improvised instruments. Bichachi then invited them to his birthday party to sing some Beatles songs, with Ronjoseph as lead vocalist and acoustic guitar player. Bichachi was so impressed with the Otic siblings, he then pledged to help with the band's formation. He bought them musical instruments and requested the band play for his other parties and events. The band mastered other songs until they created a full playlist for gigs, events, and competitions. They were later discovered by Bia Ong, a friend and previous employer of Bichachi. Bia Ong is a retired musician, a member of the Biatles band, a band that did renditions of Beatles songs and other prominent bands of that era in Tacloban from the 1970s through the 1990s. He mentored and trained the Otic siblings and gave them support.

The band was then called PGBI–RDGB (Philippine Guardians Brotherhood Inc – Roger David Gabero Bichachi). The first line-up consisted of Ronjoseph on vocals, Ralph on bass guitar, Raymart on rhythm guitar, and Reno on drums. In 2009, they started entering competitions and singing at events to earn a living. Since their father did not have a stable job, singing at these events was a big help in paying for school and meeting their family's financial needs.

They later changed the name of the band to Reo Brothers, derived from the first letters of their first name, middle name, and surname: 'R' for Reno, Ronjoseph, Raymart and Ralph, 'E' for Evasco, their mother's maiden name, and 'O' for Otic, their surname.

More and more people took notice of the band as they went from gig to gig. On June 22, 2012, they met Reynaldo Fuentes. He was so impressed with the band that he gave them his calling card and told them to contact him in case they decided to come to Manila. The band was featured twice on a local religious TV channel in Tacloban. They were content to continue living in Tacloban, where they became popular and earned enough for their financial needs, until a super typhoon, Typhoon Haiyan, known as Typhoon Yolanda in the Philippines, hit Tacloban.

=== Typhoon Haiyan in Tacloban (November 2013) ===
Typhoon Haiyan hit Tacloban, Philippines, on November 8, 2013. There was widespread devastation from the storm surge in Tacloban city, with many buildings and trees destroyed, and cars piled up. The low-lying areas on the eastern side of Tacloban city were the hardest hit, with some areas completely washed away.

The Otic family, residents of Tacloban in the province of Leyte, survived Super Typhoon Haiyan (known in the Philippines as Yolanda), which made landfall on 8 November 2013 and devastated much of the Eastern Visayas region. Although the family came through the storm unharmed, the destruction left them without a home or means of livelihood, as the band's performances had been the household's main source of income. With local telecommunications largely knocked out, it was not until two days after the typhoon that Raymart Otic was able to re-establish contact with relatives in Manila through a social networking site. Upon learning of the family's situation, the siblings based in Manila decided to bring the entire household to the capital.

The Otic family walked for more than an hour to reach the bus terminal, where they were met by a brother-in-law who worked as a driver for Philtranco. The four brothers carried only their guitars and a small change of clothes, and during the journey the family subsisted on biscuits, candies, and a single gallon of water. The trip to Manila took more than two days, after which the family settled in a small apartment in Quezon City. The relocation marked the beginning of the band's transition into the Manila music scene, which culminated weeks later with their appearance at the ABS-CBN Christmas Special at the Araneta Coliseum in December 2013.

=== Reo Brothers in Manila (November 2013 to present) ===
After a week in Manila, they remembered the calling card given to them by Fuentes during one of their gigs in Tacloban. They successfully made contact and met up with Fuentes, who referred them to his friend Tom Banguis Jr., a businessman and band adviser. On November 26, 2013, at the InfinitiF, a professional band rehearsal studio in Makati, Banguis asked them to play three selections. After hearing the band play and sing, Banguis and his band ended up clapping. According to Banguis, they performed with polish and finesse normally associated only with mature, much-older professional bands.

Banguis then called up Bobby Caparas, general manager of the Primos Cuisine and Lounge, and implored him to give these Tacloban boys a try, even if it was just for a meal and transport money. Caparas then booked a slot on Thursday, November 28. The audience was so impressed with their first gig that they did not want them to stop playing that night. The boys gladly obliged, perhaps overwhelmed by the crowd's appreciation. The Primos management then announced that the band would be back the following evening, Friday, November 29. The Friday evening crowd was just as enthusiastic and appreciative of the band, which played almost 3 hours of continuous music. Still, it was just a repeat of a "one-shot" performance. Primos then engaged the band in regular gigs on Tuesday evenings, which provided them needed exposure and financial stability in Manila, where they decided to stay while Tacloban was slowly rebuilding.

Banguis decided to share their story with the national television networks in the Philippines. ABS-CBN responded to his letter and wanted the band to appear on their annual Christmas celebration dubbed Kwento ng Pasko – Pag-asa at Pagbangon (Story of Christmas – Hope and Resurrection) on Tuesday, December 10, at Araneta Coliseum, which was aired on December 14–15.

=== International success ===
The band performed at The Theater at Madison Square Garden in New York for the Pinoy Relief Benefit Concert on March 11, 2014, with other performers, such as Jennifer Hudson, Pentatonix, Plain White T's, A Great Big World, Jessica Sanchez, apl.de.ap, DJ Poet Name Life, and Charice.

After their performance in New York, the band performed for a benefit concert called Here Comes the Sun in Southern California, presented by the Rotary Club of Historic Filipinotown in Glendale.

On June 14, 2014, the band performed at the Sun Pearl Arakawa, Tokyo, Japan called Damo Nga Salamat ("Thank You Very Much"), a thanksgiving concert presented by The Philippine Assistance Group. The event featured the Reo Brothers with guests Charito, FilCom Chorale, and Sayaka Akimoto.

In August 2014, they became the first Filipino musicians to perform at the historic Cavern Club in Liverpool, England, the birthplace of The Beatles. The brothers were doing a 3-day tour of the United Kingdom: on August 1 at the Cavern Club, on August 2 at the Bournbrook and Selly Oak Social Club in Birmingham, and on August 3 at the Northumberland Theatre in London.

Almost three months later, the band was back in the United Kingdom for their second tour. They performed at the Cavern Club on October 31 and November 2 at Ten Foundation in Belfast, Northern Ireland, at Benwell & Springback Club in Newcastle upon Tyne on November 7, and at The Dome in London on November 9, 2014.

On July 15, 2022, the band kicked-off their 12-leg USA tour at the Ahern Hotel, Las Vegas, Nevada and performed their last leg at the Arlington Music Hall, Arlington, Texas on August 14, 2022.

== Discography ==
=== Studio albums ===
| Album | Tracks | Year | Label |
|---|---|---|---|
| The Reo Brothers of Tacloban | "Manila" "Awitin Mo, Isasayaw Ko" "Titser's Enemy #1" "Pinoy Ako" "Ako'y Tinamaan" "Bakit?" | 2015 | Star Music |

== Television appearances ==
Television
| Date | Show | Network |
|---|---|---|
| 2012 | Ang Pamilyang May K, OK | PRTV, IBC 6, AAC 24, CCTN, CAT8 |
| July 2013 | Ang Pamilyang May K, OK | PRTV, IBC 6, AAC 24, CCTN, CAT8 |
| December 10, 2013 | Umagang Kay Ganda | ABS-CBN |
| December 14–15, 2013 | ABS-CBN Christmas Special 2013 | ABS-CBN |
| December 25, 2013 | It's Showtime | ABS-CBN |
| January 31, 2014 | Banana Nite | ABS-CBN |
| February 12, 2014 | Bandila | ABS-CBN |
| February 25, 2014 | Unang Hirit | GMA Network |
| March 2, 2014 | Balitanghali | GMA Network |
| March 3, 2014 | News to Go | GMA Network |
| March 10, 2014 | Coconuts Sessions: The Reo Brothers Band | Coconuts TV (YouTube Channel) |
| March 11, 2014 | TV Patrol | ABS-CBN |
| March 14, 2014 | Kababayan Today L.A. | KSCI |
| April 20, 2014 | Rated K | ABS-CBN |
| April 27, 2014 | Pinoy Big Brother | ABS-CBN |
| April 27, 2014 | Citizen Pinoy | The Filipino Channel, ABS-CBN News Channel |
| June 14, 2014 | Gawad Geny Lopez Jr. Bayaning Pilipino 2014 | ABS-CBN |
| July 13, 2014 | Daniel Padilla 'DOS' on Sunday's Best | ABS-CBN |
| August 4, 2014 | Bandila | ABS-CBN |
| May 29, 2016 | Kapuso Mo Jessica Soho | GMA Network |

== Band members ==
Reno – lead vocals; drums

Ronjoseph – lead vocals; lead guitar

Raymart – lead vocals; rhythm guitar

Ralph – lead vocals; bass

Roy Mark - keys
