= Tillie Moreno =

Filipina singer (born 1953)

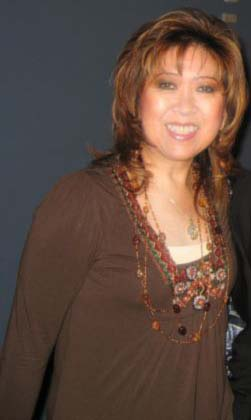

Background information
- Born: May 22, 1953
- Origin: Manila, Philippines
- Genres: R&B, soul, jazz, pop
- Years active: 1972–present
- Website: Official Myspace

Tillie Moreno, also known as "Manila's Queen of Soul", is a Filipino R&B/soul/pop vocalist and entertainer whose career began in the 1970s.

Moreno has been performing since while being a student. She joined the bands, the Circus Band where her career began while in college, as well as Lovelife. Later as a solo artist, she became known with the hit single "Saan Ako Nagkamali," and "Umagang Kay Ganda"—one of the duets with Ray-An Fuentes.

To this day, Moreno continues her singing career even after moving to the United States in the early 1980s.

== Biography ==
=== Early life ===
Tillie Moreno, who was born in Manila, Philippines, became interested in music and performing at the young age of eleven.

At a very young age, Moreno was enrolled by her parents in piano lessons; and learned playing guitar by herself.

Moreno started singing while in grade school in St. Theresa's College. While being a teenager, she formed a singing group Take Five with her classmates. In her college years, along with some friends, she started a band named Ultimate Jury, which composed of her brother and two cousins. She was the keyboardist and taught her co-members harmonization.

=== Career ===
==== With the Circus Band and Lovelife ====
Moreno's career started in 1972, also while in college, as a member of the Circus Band, said to be the top music group in the 1970s, joining Hajji Alejandro, Pat Castillo, and Basil Valdez, among others. They made five albums before its disbandment.

Thereafter, she briefly joined another band, the Lovelife (with Valdez and Alejandro) until they became solo artists. They performed in hotels in Japan, Singapore and Abu Dhabi.

==== Solo music career ====
Going solo in 1978, she had a contract from Blackgold Recording Company and became known for the hit single "Saan Ako Nagkamali." She also recorded four albums with WEA Records.

Within the decade, she recorded two duets with Ray-An Fuentes, "Umagang Kay Ganda" and "Beginnings."

"Nothing I Want More" is her another signature song. Moreno and Jun Latonio initially composed the song, with which Eugene Villaluz and Louie Reyes, both formerly from another 1970s group New Minstrels, won the grand prize in the Seoul International Film Festival.

Being an OPM icon, she has the ability to sing and has been involved in various music genres, particularly rhythm and blues and pop jazz. She does disco, ballad, and slow rock as well.

Moreno decided to leave the Philippines in 1981, moving to the United States where she continued pursuing her singing career. As of early 2010s, she is still performing in shows, mostly for the Filipino communities.

=== Personal life ===
Prior to her departure for the United States, four of her siblings were already living there. She later married American Monty Filsinger; they have two daughters.

By early 2000s, while being based in Chicago, she worked for Kodak, full-time as administrator for distribution of the firm's graphics company.

As of 2012, they are living in Nebraska, except for her older daughter who was based in Chicago.

== Discography ==
=== Singles ===
- "Saan Ako Nagkamali"
- "Umagang Kay Ganda" – duet with Ray-An Fuentes
- "Beginnings" – duet with Ray-An Fuentes
- "Nothing I Want More"
