= Basil Valdez =

Filipino singer (born 1951)

- Born: Basil Salvador Valdez; November 8, 1951 (age 74); Manila, Philippines
- Occupation: Singer
- Years active: 1972–present

Basil Salvador Valdez (Tagalog pronunciation: [bɐlˈdɛs]; born November 8, 1951) is a Filipino singer. He has received several Tinig Awards and the 1991 Tanglaw ng Lahi Award from Ateneo de Manila University.

== Biography ==
Valdez recalled in a 2024 interview that his impromptu performance in a Catholic retreat, which he attended while being a college freshman, marked the beginning of his journey. Despite he barely knew to play the guitar that time, he substituted for the designated guitarist who had fallen ill. He played and sang continuously until he "ran out of songs" and ended singing "The Fool on the Hill" by the Beatles and "Alfie" by Dionne Warwick.

Valdez became the leading balladeer as Original Pilipino Music (OPM) flourished in the 1970s. He was a member of the Circus Band, which also produced other soloists including Hajji Alejandro, Tillie Moreno, Jacqui Magno, Pat Castillo, Pabs Dadivas and Richard Tann. It was Valdez who recruited Alejandro to the band after the latter's performance in Ateneo de Manila University where the former and his fellow alumni, Apo Hiking Society, were among the guests. The band was to conduct for a nationwide campus tour.

After the breakup of the band, Valdez, Alejandro and Moreno, briefly formed another band Lovelife, until they became solo artists.

Valdez has been a recording artist since 1977 when he recorded "Ngayon at Kailanman", a wedding song, and the album containing it. He interpreted the works by composers, Ryan Cayabyab—his long-time musical director; and George Canseco—recording 25. He also have collaboration with Willy Cruz, a composer and conductor; as well as Louie Ocampo and composer Ernani Cuenco.

Valdez's other works include: "Let the Pain Remain," "Nais Ko," and "Salamin ng Buhay." Some of his songs became movie themes from the 1980s.

Valdez has praying first, every performance since the 1970s. By 2024, he is focusing on church performances and corporate shows.

== Discography ==
=== Albums ===
- Ngayon at Kailanman (1977, Blackgold Records)
- Basil (1978, Blackgold Records)
- Ngayon (1979, Blackgold Records)
- Corner of the Sky (1981, Blackgold Records)
- Basil (1982, Blackgold Records)
- Basil (1984, Blackgold Records)
- Nag-Iisang Pangarap (1986, Blackgold Records)
- Sundin Ang Loob Mo (1992, Viva Records)
- Ala-Ala (1998, Viva Records)
- The Best Of Basil Valdez (2004, ANGPED AVR Records Corporation)

=== Compilation albums ===
- The Best of Love Duets (Viva Collection Forever) (1998, Viva Records)

=== Singles ===
- A Memory (1980)
- Ala-Ala
- Alay
- Alfie (1980)
- Ama
- Awit ng Buhay (1979)
- Babalik Ka Rin
- Bakas ng Lumipas
- Bakit Ka Nagbago? (1979)
- Basil S. Valdez (2011)
- Bayan Ko (1977) (original by Ruben Tagalog, Freddie Aguilar, also covered by Kuh Ledesma, also covered by Joanne Lorenzana)
- Bituing Marikit
- Buhay (1978)
- Bukas
- Buksan
- Corner of the Sky (1980)
- Dahil Sa Isang Bulaklak
- Dasal
- Dito
- Di Na Muling Mag-Iisa (duet with Pat Castillo)
- Dito Na Muling Mag-iisa (1986)
- Dito Nagwawakas (1978)
- Diyos Lamang ang Nakakaalam
- Don't Let Me Go (duet with Bambi Encarnacion) (1981)
- Dreamin' (1983)
- Fool That I Am (1983)
- From Now On
- Gaano Kadalas ang Minsan (1981) (covered by La Diva for the theme song of the 2008 TV series of the same name, and Christian Bautista for the TV series Walang Hanggan in 2012)
- Gabing Kulimlim
- Galing Sa Puso
- Hanap-Hanap Ka (1986)
- Hanggang
- Hanggang Kailan Kaya? (1977)
- Hanggang Sa Dulo ng Walang Hanggan (1977) (also covered by Zsa Zsa Padilla for the TV series Sa Dulo ng Walang Hanggan in 2001, and by Gary V. and Nina for the TV series Walang Hanggan in 2012)
- Hawak Mo ang Panahon (1979)
- Hindi Kita Malilimutan (1983) (also covered by Bukas Palad in 1986, also covered by Gary V. in 2000)
- I Just Think You're Beautiful (1981)
- Iduyan Mo (1979)
- Ikaw
- Ikaw, Lamang Pala (1986)
- Ikaw Na Nga
- Imortal
- Inang Mahal (1986)
- Iyong Mga Yapak
- Iyong Pag-ibig
- Kahit Ako'y Lupa (1978)
- Kahit Ika'y Panaginip Lang (1978) (also covered by Regine Velasquez, Nyoy Volante with Mannos in 2003, and by Ice Seguerra & Richard Poon)
- Kahit Na Magtiis (1986) (also covered by Joseph Estrada and Ariel Rivera)
- Kaibigan
- Kaibigang Kalikasan (1979)
- Kailan (1977)
- Kailan Pa (1979)
- Kanlungan (2011) (original by Buklod with Noel Cabangon)
- Kastilyong Buhangin (1977)
- Kay Ganda ng Daigdig (1977)
- Kayumanggi (1979)
- Kristo
- Kundiman (1986)
- Kung Ako Na Lang Sana (2011) (original by Bituin Escalante in 2002; also covered by Sharon Cuneta, by Vina Morales for the TV series Impostor in 2010, by Martin Nievera in 2013, and by December Avenue in 2017)
- Kung Ako'y Iiwan Mo (1977)
- Kung Nagsasayaw Kita
- Kunin Mo (1981)
- Labis Kitang Minamahal (1978)
- Lagi Kitang Naaalala
- Lagi Na Lang (duet with Leah Navarro)
- Laya (1977)
- Lead Me Lord (1983) (also covered by Gary V. in 2000 and Ice Seguerra in 2014)
- Let the Pain Remain (1980) (also covered by Side A in 1998)
- Lift Up Your Hands (1980) (also covered by Gary V. in 2000 and by Kathryn Bernardo in 2017 for the latter's second album Lovelife with Kath)
- Love Card (1981)
- Love Is the Reason
- Lumuhod Ka Sa Lupa
- Madaling Araw
- Magtitiis (duet with Pilita Corrales)
- Mahiwaga (also covered by Fatima Soriano and the Mandaluyong Children's Choir in 2011)
- Maria
- Maybe (1981)
- Michel Legrand Medley (1980)
- Minsan Pa (also covered by Sharon Cuneta)
- Minsan Pa Nating Hagkan ang Nakaraan (1983)
- Muling Buksan ang Puso (1985) (also covered by Erik Santos in 2013)
- Muntik Nang Maabot ang Langit (2011) (original by True Faith in 1994)
- Nag-Iisang Pangarap (1986)
- Nais Ko (1978) (also covered by the late Francis M. & also covered by Ogie Alcasid in 2012)
- Narito Ka (1986)
- Nariyan Ka Rin (1983)
- Ngayon (1979)
- Ngayon at Kailanman (1977) (also covered by Jan Nieto as the theme song of the 2009 TV series of the same title, by Vina Morales for the 2010 TV series Kristine, by Ariel Rivera for the 2012 TV series Ina, Kapatid, Anak, and by Jona for the 2018 TV series of the same title)
- Paalam (1979)
- Paano Ba ang Mangarap? (1981)
- Paano Na Kaya? (2011) (original by Bugoy Drilon in 2008)
- Pagdating ng Panahon (with The Company) (2011) (original by Ice Seguerra in 2001; also covered by Martin Nievera in 2006, and by Kathryn Bernardo for the 2013 TV series Got to Believe)
- Pagputi ng Uwak (1978) (original soundtrack)
- Pagsinta'y Pang-Araw at Ulan (1977)
- Panahon (1981)
- Pangarap Ko'y Ikaw (1978)
- Paraisong Parisukat (1977)
- Pasko na Sinta Ko (2003)
- Pintig ng Dibdib (1986)
- Sa Ugoy ng Duyan (also covered by Jeremiah Boy Group in 1999)
- Salamat Ama
- Salamat Maria (2007) (in celebration of the Centenary of the Canonical Coronation of Our Lady of the Holy Rosary La Naval de Manila)
- Salamin ng Buhay (1983)
- Sana ay Ikaw Na Nga (1981) (also covered by Vina Morales)
- Sana'y Maghintay ang Walang Hanggan (also covered by Zsa Zsa Padilla)
- Sana'y Malaya Ako
- Sapagka't Kami ay Tao Lamang
- Say That You Love Me (1983) (also covered by Martin Nievera in 1989)
- Show Me the Way
- Sino ang Baliw (1983) (original by Mon Del Rosario in 1981, also covered by Kuh Ledesma in 1983)
- Siya Na Ba? (1979)
- Sometime, Somewhere (1980)
- Stars (1983)
- Sumasamba
- Sundin ang Loob Mo
- Tanging Yaman (Original by Bukas Palad in 1989, also covered by Carol Banawa in 2000, Agot Isidro in 2010 and Noel Cabangon in 2016)
- The Harder I Try, The Bluer I Get (2003) (original by The Free Movement & part of the various artists album, "The Best of Crossover Presents" released by VIVA Records Corp. & 105.1 Crossover)
- The Power of Love
- Tuldukan Na'ng Hapis (1983)
- Tunay Na Ligaya (1986) (also covered by Ariel Rivera in 1996 from the various artists' album, "Ryan Cayabyab @ 25: The Silver Album by Sony Music Philippines in 1996)
- Tuwing Umuulan at Kapiling Ka (1980) (also covered by the Eraserheads in 1996, Regine Velasquez in 2000, and Noel Cabangon in 2012)
- We're Falling in Love (duet with Angela Bofill)
- Where Am I Going? (1980)
- With You (1980)
- You (1980)
