= Cooky Chua =

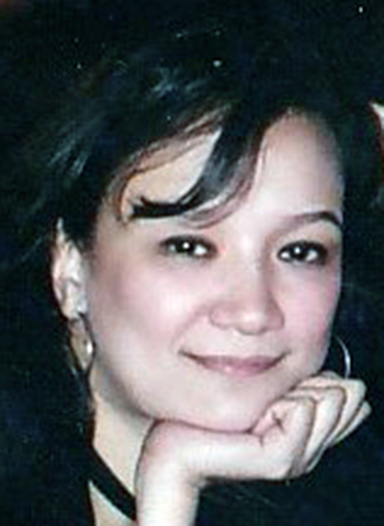
- Cooky Chua

Background information
- Born: 1971 or 1972 (age 54)
- Origin: Philippines
- Genres: Alternative rock, jazz
- Occupations: Singer, works in data management field
- Instrument: Voice
- Years active: 1989 – current
- Member of: Color It Red, Tres Marias
- Award: Golden Voice of Asia Award

Cooky Chua (born 1971 or 1972) is a Filipino singer. She is best known as the vocalist of the band she co-founded, Color It Red, and as a recipient of the Golden Voice of Asia Award in Hanoi, Vietnam. She is also a member of the band Tres Marias that she formed together with Lolita Carbon and Bayang Barrios.

== Career ==
In 1989, while still in high school, Cooky Chua formed the band Color It Red together with Barbi Cristi and Maricar Florendo. They performed at Club Dredd. In 1994, they released their first album titled Hand Painted Sky. They received an Awit Award in 1995 for Best Performance by a New Group. They also won the Katha Awards in 2002 for Best Vocal Performance in the Rock category. Some of their well-known songs include "Paglisan" and "Na Naman." In 1997, Cooky Chua and Wency Cornejo performed a duet on the song "Walang Hanggang," and they won the Awit Award for Best Performance in a Duet.

Aside from singing with the band Color It Red, Cooky Chua also performs in hotels. She also sings jazz pieces and songs from the 1940s and 1950s. Cooky Chua portrayed Lidy, the wife of an activist, in the musical production Lean, a Filipino Musical in 1997.

In 1998, Cooky Chua was awarded the Golden Voice of Asia Award in Hanoi, Vietnam. In 2012, Cooky Chua, Lolita Carbon, and Bayang Barrios formally formed the band Tres Marias.

Cooky Chua was among the performers in a show titled Awit Para Kay Coritha at My Brother's Mustache Folkbar in Quezon City on August 5, 2024. The event aimed to raise funds to help Coritha, who had suffered a stroke.

Cooky Chua also joined Wency Cornejo of AfterImage, Naldy Padilla of Orient Pearl, and Lei Bautista of Prettier Than Pink in a concert of original Filipino music on January 25, 2025, at the Music Museum.

== Personal life ==
Cooky Chua has been working part-time in the field of data management for twelve years whenever she is not busy performing with a band.

Cooky Chua and Earl Ignacio were married, but their marriage was annulled in 2006. They have a child named Joaquin Ignacio, who is also a vocalist and the lead guitarist of his own band, Cutting Corners.
