= Gary Granada =

Filipino musician and poet (born 1960)

- Born: Gary Granada; 1960 (age 65–66)
- Origin: Maco, Davao de Oro
- Genres: Rock, folk rock
- Occupation: Singer-songwriter
- Instruments: Vocals, guitar
- Years active: 1988–present

Gary Gamutan Granada (born 1960 in Maco, Davao de Oro) is a well-known Filipino musician, composer, poet, and singer-songwriter known for writing songs which have strong political themes.

He is also a tutor at the University of the Philippines, an anarchist activist and organizer, broadcaster, voice talent, and a board member in several organizations.

== Early life ==
Granada was born in 1960 to mother Cristina Gamutan (a dressmaker) and father Ireneo (a fisherman). Growing up, he took a number of odd jobs to help support the presumably feeble family income. He graduated valedictorian in both elementary and high school but never attained a diploma in college (he enrolled in the University of the Philippines but was booted out). Even so, he taught graduate classes in both UPLB and UPOU.

== Musical career ==
Granada learned the ukulele at his father's insistence, learned how to play guitar proficiently as well, got up to grade one in piano, and never learned how to read music. He made a lot of compositions: topical compositions as well as advertising jingles, with some becoming hits at one time or another.

Granada is also an avid Barangay Ginebra San Miguel fan, and composed numerous songs about the Ginebra San Miguel Kings basketball team; "Ginebrang Ginebra"; "Kapag Nananalo ang Ginebra (When Ginebra Wins)" sung by Bayang Barrios; and "Kapag Natatalo ang Ginebra (When Ginebra Loses)", sung by himself. The latest of these tribute songs was "Dugong Ginebra", written right after the 2008 PBA Fiesta Conference championship.

In 2009, Granada accused the GMA Kapuso Foundation of violating his intellectual property rights.

In 2017, Granada commissioned with Mariano Kilates in writing the City Hymn of Legazpi "Legazpi Ngonyan (Legazpi Today)". The City hymn was installed in September 2017.

== Popular songs by Gary Granada ==
- Mabuti Pa Sila (1998 Grand Prize Champion, Metropop Song Festival 1998, also covered by the late Rico J. Puno in 2008.)
- Sa Dulang ng Ama(2002)Words and Music: Gary Granada
- Tagumpay Nating Lahat
- Salamat Musika
