= Bayang Barrios =

Filipina musician and singer

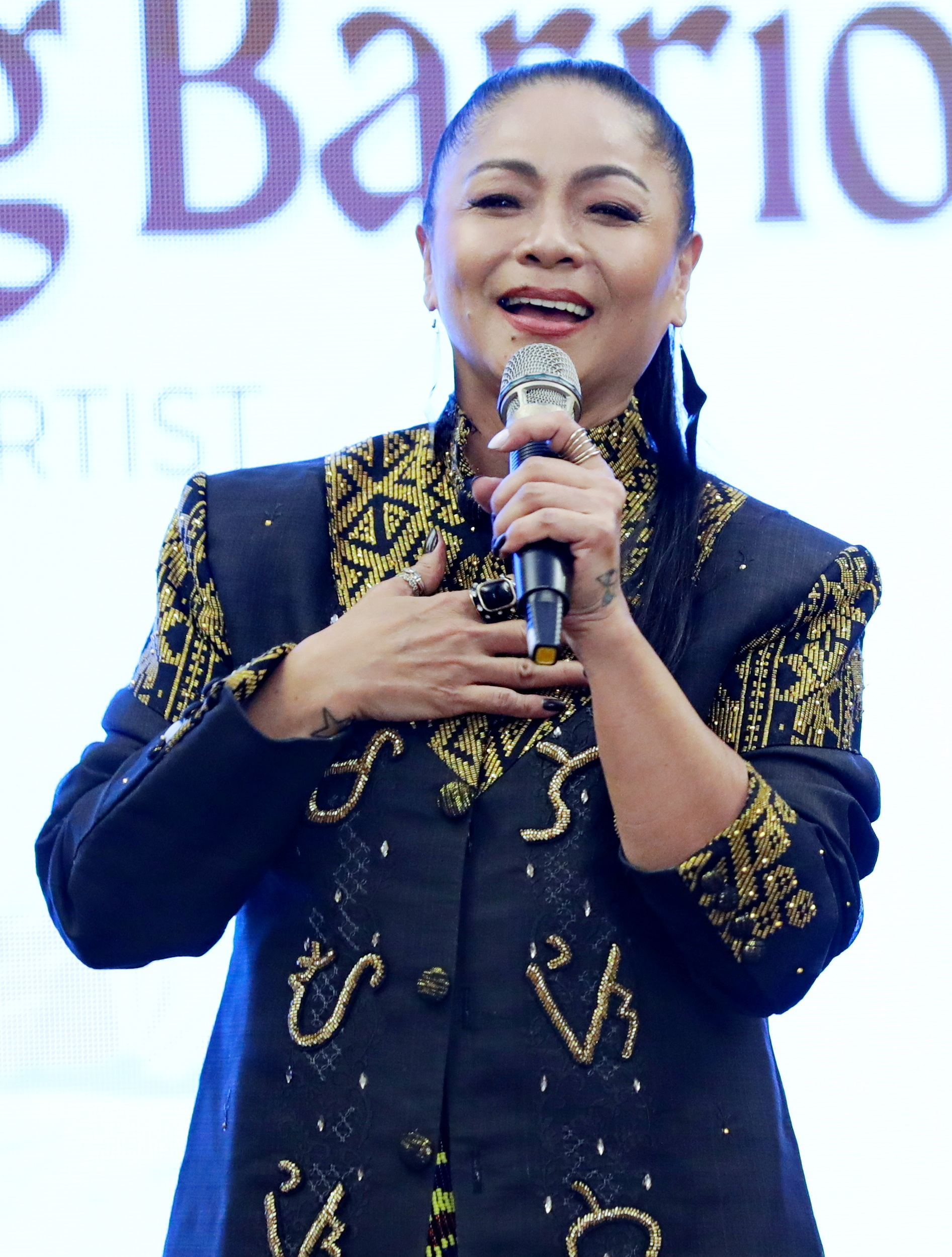
- Barrios in 2025
- Born: Junelle Otero Barrios; June 12, 1968 (age 58); Bunawan, Agusan del Sur
- Occupations: Singer-songwriter, musician, teacher, designer, peace advocate
- Years active: 1988–present
- Notable work: "Tadhana" (Encantadia theme); "Malayo Man, Malapit Din"; "Pag Nananalo Ang Ginebra"
- Spouse: Mike Villegas (m. 2002)
- Children: 1
- Musical career
- Genres: OPM; folk; alternative rock; pop
- Instruments: Vocals
- Labels: Mayumi Records (formerly Produktong Mayumi ni Bayang Barrios); Tao Music
- Member of: Bayang Barrios at ang Naliyagan; Tres Marias
- Formerly of: Joey Ayala at ang Bagong Lumad
- Website: Bayang Barrios

Bayang Barrios (born Junelie Otero Barrios on June 12, 1968) is a Filipina folk musician, singer-songwriter, teacher, designer, and peace advocate who hails from Bunawan, Agusan del Sur. Born to parents of Manobo origin, Barrios was nicknamed “Bayang” after the first word of the Philippine national anthem, Lupang Hinirang, since she was born on Independence Day (Philippines).

Considered as one of the most iconic folk musicians in the Philippines, she initially downplayed her ethnic origins until she met the songwriter-performer Joey Ayala and joined his band, Joey Ayala at ang Bagong Lumad. Many of her known songs, especially those recorded with Ayala, utilized Filipino indigenous instruments. Barrios has received numerous awards, including the Lorenzo Ruiz Award for Music from the Catholic Mass Media Awards in 1997 for her album Bayang Makulay, the Golden Vocalist of Asia Award at a Hanoi music festival in 1999, and the PMPC Best Alternative Album of the Year for her album Biyaya.

She performed her self-written song "Malayo Man, Malapit Din" at the 2003 Metropop Song Festival, where she won the Grand Prize. Some of her popular songs are "Bagong Umaga", "Pag Nananalo Ang Ginebra", and "Tadhana", the theme song for GMA Network's television series Encantadia.

== Early life ==
Bayang Barrios, a Manobo, was born in Bunawan, Agusan del Sur. She was given the nickname Bayang in keeping with her tribe's tradition of naming a child after the first word the mother hears during labor. Born on June 12, 1968, Philippine Independence Day, at exactly 7:30 a.m., Barrios got her nickname from the first word of Lupang Hinirang, the national anthem of the Philippines, as government employees were heard singing it during a flag ceremony.

Because of bullying and discrimination during her childhood due to her ethnicity, which caused her trauma, she initially resisted her indigenous roots but later embraced her identity when she entered the music scene.

Barrios earned a bachelor's degree in education, majoring in catechesis. Although she had initially planned to become a nun because of her major, she ultimately pursued a career as a teacher.

== Career ==
Barrios started her musical career when she met Joey Ayala in Davao before she graduated in college. She joined Ayala's band, Joey Ayala at ang Bagong Lumad, bringing indigenous music with a modern beat and vibe to a mainstream audience. She later embarked on a solo career with the release of her first single, "Ka Tribo Ko", from her debut album Bayang Makulay in 1996. The album received the Lorenzo Ruiz Award for Music from the Catholic Mass Media Awards in 1997, which was personally presented to her by Cardinal Jaime Sin.

Her second album, Harinawa, was released in 2001 under the independent label Tao Music, co-founded by fellow Bunawan native and musician Grace Nono. In 2003, she joined the Metropop Song Festival and her song entry, "Malayo Man, Malapit Din", which she wrote, won the Grand Prize. Eventually, "Malayo Man, Malapit Din" became the opening theme song of GMA Public Affair's show Pinoy Abroad. Her music combines folk and alternative influences, often telling stories rooted in folklore, personal narratives, and everyday experiences. These influences reflect in her 2004 album, Alon, her the third album second indie release.

Among her most notable works is "Tadhana", the theme song of GMA Network's hit television series Encantadia in 2005. The original piece, composed and arranged by Allan Feliciano, had no lyrics. After hearing the instrumental, Barrios improvised the chants at Feliciano's direction, feeling the music as if she were the Encantada, with the forests gone and her people violated.

Also In 2005, Barrios' composition "Isipin Mo Na Lang", co-written with her husband Mike Villegas, played at the ending credits of the indie Filipino film Ang Pagdadalaga ni Maximo Oliveros. In 2008, she released her fourth album, Biyaya, which won Best Alternative Album of the Year at the 1st PMPC Star Awards for Music. This album is another indie release under Mayumi record label, named after her daughter, Mayumi.

In 2012, she joined Lolita Carbon and Cooky Chua to form the female group Tres Marias, while continuing their respective solo careers. September 2013 saw the release of her fifth studio album entitled Malaya. Another one of her famous work, the single "Pag Nananalo Ang Ginebra" that was originally composed by Gary Granada and released in 1997, regained popularity in 2016 when the Philippine basketball team Barangay Ginebra San Miguel won the 2016 PBA Governors' Cup.

Her sixth album, Sariwang Hangin, was released in 2021 with her band Naliyagan. Officially known as Bayang Barrios at ang Naliyagan, the group was formed in 2016. In 2023, after 35 years in the music industry, Barrios held her first solo concert at the CCP Tanghalang Ignacio B. Gimenez.

== Personal life ==
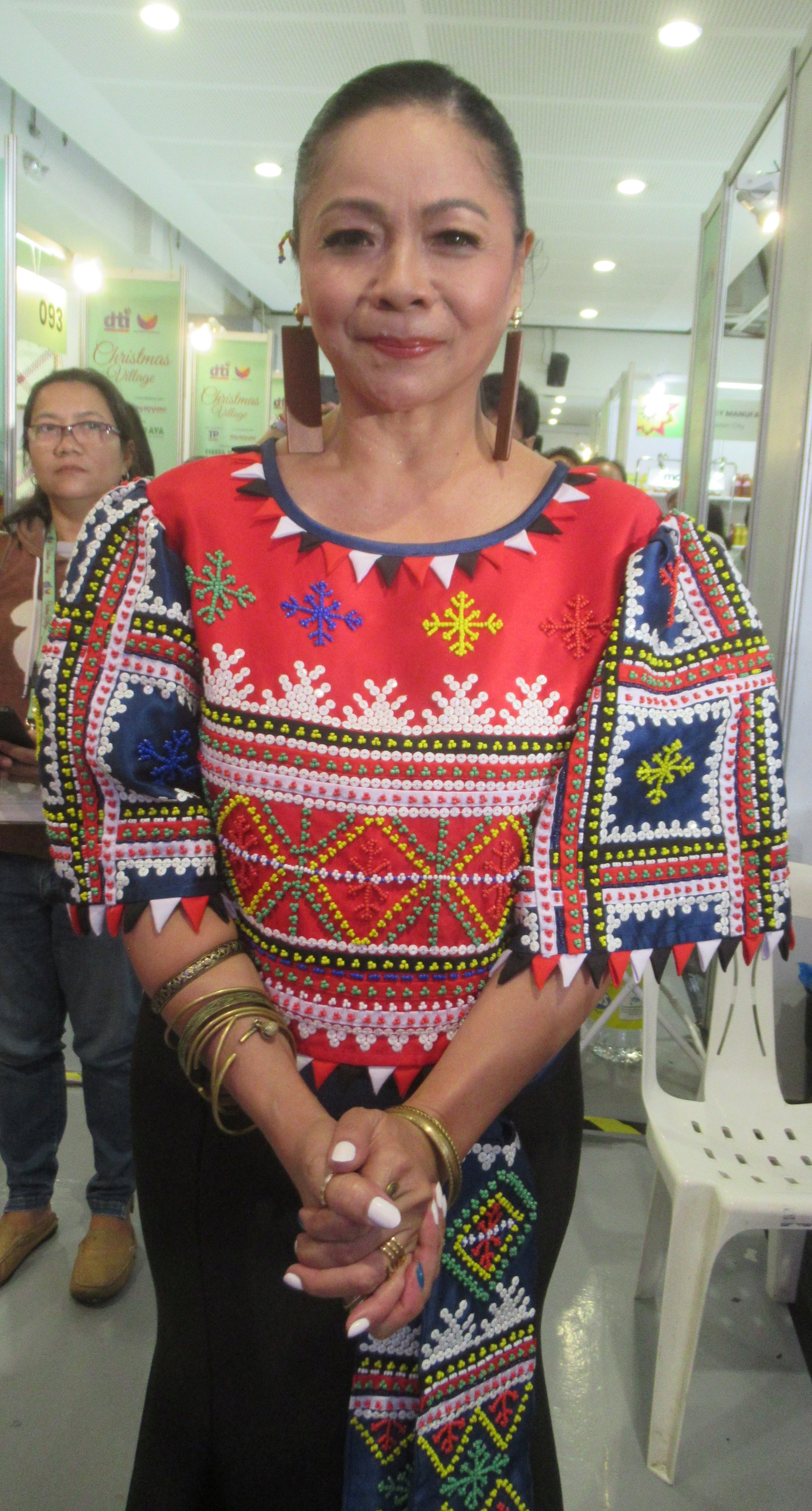
Barrios in traditional Manobo attire, 2025.

Barrios began her advocacy for defending the rights of indigenous peoples when she became a solo singer. Through her music, she promotes the recognition and respect of indigenous cultures as well as the broader Filipino identity.

Barrios married to Rizal Underground guitarist Mike Villegas in 2002. They have a daughter, Mayumi, born in 2006, who has mild autism.

== Discography ==
=== Albums ===
- Bayang Makulay (1996)
- Singles (Bayang Barrios)
- Harinawa (2001)
- Alon (2004)
- Biyaya (2008)
- Malaya (2013)

=== Singles ===
- "Hade!! (Etheria Theme Song)"
- "Alay Sa Aking Mga Kapatid"
- "Ayoko Na"
- "Bagong Umaga"
- "Habang Narito Pa"
- "Ka-Tribo Ko"
- "Kay Tsong"
- "Lalalala-laryang (Himig ni Inay)"
- "Malayo Man, Malapit Din" – (Theme from Pinoy Abroad)
- "Mekaniko Ng Makina Ko"
- "Mulat" – (Theme from Limang Dekada and 70 Years of Philippine TV)
- "Nasaan Na Tayo Ngayon"
- "Saan Nanggagaling Ang Himig?"
- "Sanggol Sa Sinapupunan"
- "Matanglawin"
- "Alon"
- "Gising Na Kaibigan"

== Awards ==
Event	Award	Song/Album	Year	Result
Awit Awards	Best Alternative Song	"Malayo Man, Malapit Din"	2003	Nominated
Metropop Song Festival	Grand Prize	"Malayo Man, Malapit Din"	2003	Win
KATHA Awards	category:World Music Vocal	"Ngansiba"	2002	Nominated
Himig Handog sa Bayaning Pilipino (songwriting contest)		"Bayani" composer: Mike Villegas interpreters: Zebedee Zuñiga, Bayang Barrios and Katrice Gavino	2000	Finalist
Hanoi Music Festival	Asian Vocalist Festival Golden Award		1999	Awarded
Anvil Awards	Lorenzo Ruiz Award for Music	"Lakbayin ang Pilipinas" composer: Gary Granada interpreter: Bayang Barrios	1998	Win
Catholic Mass Media Awards	Lorenzo Ruiz Award for Music	"Bayang Makulay"	1997	Win
KATHA Awards	category:World Music Song	"Bagong Umaga"	1997	Awarded
KATHA Awards	category:Folk Vocal Performance	"Saan Nangagaling ang Himig"	1997	Awarded
KATHA Awards	category:Folk Song	"Saan Nangagaling ang Himig"	1997	Awarded
KATHA Awards	category:Folk Arrangement	"Alay sa mga Kapatid"	1997	Awarded
KATHA Awards	category:Folk Album	"Bayang Makulay"	1997	Awarded
Metropop Song Festival (songwriting contest)		"Bagong Umaga" composed by Mike Villegas and Bayang Barrios	1996	Finalist
