= Louie Reyes =

- Born: Maria Luisa Reyes; March 14, 1951
- Died: October 25, 2025 (aged 74) United States
- Genres: Jazz
- Formerly of: The New Minstrels (1972–1977)
- Spouse: Cesar de la Fuente (m. 1979)

Maria Luisa Reyes de la Fuente (March 14, 1951 – October 25, 2025), professionally known as Louie Reyes, was a Filipina jazz singer known for being a member of The New Minstrels.

== Early life and education ==
Maria Luisa Reyes was born on March 14, 1951. Reyes attended the College of the Holy Spirit Manila where she took up music education.

== Career ==
Reyes became part of The New Minstrels which was founded in 1972. The jazz group was formed from Eugene Villaluz and Cesar de la Fuente who are leftovers of the Minstrels, a five-man group based in San Beda College and four new members from an audition which includes Reyes. Reyes left The New Minstrels in 1977 to go solo.

Reyes and de la Fuente managed the 1985-established group, The Company during its first nine years.

However, Reyes only had limited success only having one single before holding her first concert "Passions" in 1988.

In 1991, Reyes published her album It's Time, which had the songs such as "Body and Soul," "Please Don't Go," and "Out of Words."

== Personal life ==
Reyes married Cesar de la Fuente in January 1979, one of the co-founders of The New Minstrels. The couple emigrated to the United States in 1997. She also taught at the Arts Development School of Music in Bellflower, California, She reportedly died in the United States on October 25, 2025 at age 74 due to ovarian cancer.
