= List of Everybody, Sing! season 3 episodes =

- More about the series

Episodes overview
- Total episode(s): 74 episodes
- Aired episode(s): 38 episodes
- Rerun(s): 36 episodes
- Last updated on August 18, 2024

The third season of the musical game show Everybody, Sing! aired 74 episodes between June 3, 2023, and February 11, 2024, with 38 aired episodes and 36 re-run episodes, the most of any season in the series.

This season, nineteen groups played the entire series, and only five groups claimed the jackpot prize of more than ₱2,000,000, tying the second season.

== Episodes overview ==
Legend

The Songbayanan received the highest possible amount as their winning prize in the jackpot round (more than ₱2,000,000.)
The Songbayanan did not receive the highest possible amount as their winning prize in the jackpot round.
The Songbayanan did not receive any amount as their winning prize in the jackpot round.
No data.

List of Everybody, Sing! season 3 episodes
Episode		Songbayanan	Prize won	Ref.
No.	Airing date	Songbayanan	Prize won	Ref.
Season 3
1	June 3, 2023	100 Pulis (Policemen & Policewomen)	₱150,000 (Note: Excluding additional cash prize given by Vice Ganda.)	
2	June 4, 2023	100 Pulis (Policemen & Policewomen)	₱150,000	
3	June 10, 2023	100 Sanitation Workers	₱230,000	
4	June 11, 2023	100 Sanitation Workers	₱230,000	
5	June 17, 2023	100 Mag-Ama (Fathers and Children)	₱2,140,000	
6	June 18, 2023	100 Mag-Ama (Fathers and Children)	₱2,140,000	
7	June 24, 2023	100 Manila Fire Survivors (May 2023 Sta. Cruz, Manila Fire Incident Survivors)	₱2,200,000	
8	June 25, 2023	100 Manila Fire Survivors (May 2023 Sta. Cruz, Manila Fire Incident Survivors)	₱2,200,000	
9	July 1, 2023	100 Engaged Couples	₱290,000	
10	July 2, 2023	100 Engaged Couples	₱290,000	
11	July 8, 2023	100 Sari-Sari Store Sellers (Variety Store Sellers)	₱150,000	
12	July 9, 2023	100 Sari-Sari Store Sellers (Variety Store Sellers)	₱150,000	
13	July 15, 2023	100 Tattoo & Body Piercing Artists	₱180,000	
14	July 16, 2023	100 Tattoo & Body Piercing Artists	₱180,000	
15	July 29, 2023	100 Nurses	₱190,000	
16	July 30, 2023	100 Nurses	₱190,000	
17	August 5, 2023	100 Government Employees	₱180,000	
18	August 6, 2023	100 Government Employees	₱180,000	
19	September 2, 2023	100 Mangangalakal (Garbage Collectors)	₱2,200,000	
20	September 3, 2023	100 Mangangalakal (Garbage Collectors)	₱2,200,000	
21	September 9, 2023	100 Dancers	₱130,000	
22	September 10, 2023	100 Dancers	₱130,000	
23	September 16, 2023	100 2023 College Graduates	₱210,000	
24	September 17, 2023	100 2023 College Graduates	₱210,000	
25	September 23, 2023	100 Pawnshop & Money Remittance Tellers	₱150,000	
26	September 24, 2023	100 Pawnshop & Money Remittance Tellers	₱150,000	
27	September 30, 2023	100 Band Members	₱170,000	
28	October 1, 2023	100 Band Members	₱170,000	
29	October 14, 2023	100 Taguig Tenement Community (Fort Bonifacio Tenement Occupants)	₱140,000	
30	October 15, 2023	100 Taguig Tenement Community (Fort Bonifacio Tenement Occupants)	₱140,000	
31	November 18, 2023	100 Pharmacists & Botika Employees (Licensed Pharmacists & Pharmacy Employees)	₱2,080,000	
32	November 19, 2023	100 Pharmacists & Botika Employees (Licensed Pharmacists & Pharmacy Employees)	₱2,080,000	
33	November 25, 2023	100 Solo Parents	₱270,000	
34	November 26, 2023	100 Solo Parents	₱270,000	
35	December 2, 2023	100 Magbabalut (Fertilized Duck Egg Vendors)	₱180,000	
36	December 3, 2023	100 Magbabalut (Fertilized Duck Egg Vendors)	₱180,000	
37	February 10, 2024	100 Divisoria Stall Sellers	₱2,040,000	
38	February 11, 2024	100 Divisoria Stall Sellers	₱2,040,000	

== Episodes ==
In each episode's jackpot round (Ultimate Everybody, GuesSing) section:

- The song title with a gold border indicates that it was assigned as the "Golden Time Bonus," which adds ten seconds to their timer when correctly guessed. If the background is green, they correctly guessed the title and ten seconds were added to their timer; if it is red, they did not correctly guess the title and the ten seconds were not added to their timer. The additional time is added to their total number of seconds earned in the second preliminary round.
- The table excludes songs that each group did not correctly guess in the first round of the jackpot round, unless they reached their target number of songs (as in episodes 3, 5, 7, 9, 19, 23, and 33). These unnamed songs were revealed at the end of the round, and they will be replaced with a new song in the final round, along with the remaining number of songs they must identify.

Legend

- – The SONGpu contestant successfully guessed the line of the song correctly.
- – The SONGpu contestant failed to give any correct line of the song.
- – During the Jackpot round ("Ultimate Everybody GuesSing"), the Songbayanan guessed the song correctly.
- – During the Jackpot round ("Ultimate Everybody GuesSing"), the Songbayanan did not guess the song correctly.

Week 1 (June 3–4, 2023)
Episode		Songbayanan	Preliminary Rounds														Jackpot round (Ultimate Everybody GuesSing)		Prize won	Ref.
No.	Airing date	Songbayanan	Game	Song	SONGpu											Timer	Songs		Prize won	Ref.
No.	Airing date	Songbayanan	Game	Song	Row	1	2	3	4	5	6	7	8	9	10	Timer	Songs		Prize won	Ref.
1	June 3, 2023	100 Pulis #EverybodySingPulis #EverybodySingBatas	Sing in the Blank	"Basang-Basa sa Ulan" by Aegis	7											60 secs.	"Mahal Kita Pero" by Janella Salvador	"Beh, Buti Nga" by Hotdog	₱150,000	
1	June 3, 2023	100 Pulis #EverybodySingPulis #EverybodySingBatas	Lights, Camera, Act-Sing	"Chasing Pavements" by Adele	4											60 secs.	"Antukin" by Rico Blanco	"Girl Be Mine" by Francis Magalona	₱150,000	
1	June 3, 2023	100 Pulis #EverybodySingPulis #EverybodySingBatas	A-B-Sing	"Lintik" by Brownman Revival	1											60 secs.	"Sigurado" by Belle Mariano	"'Di Kita Pagpapalit" by Rockstar 2	₱150,000	
1	June 3, 2023	100 Pulis #EverybodySingPulis #EverybodySingBatas	LipSing	"Hinahanap-Hanap Kita" by Rivermaya	8											60 secs.	"Same Ground" by Kitchie Nadal	"Handog" by Florante	₱150,000	
1	June 3, 2023	100 Pulis #EverybodySingPulis #EverybodySingBatas	ReverSing	"Eto Na Naman" by Gary Valenciano	3											60 secs.	"Tunay Na Mahal" by Lani Misalucha	"Meron Ba" by Nikki Valdez	₱150,000	
2	June 4, 2023	100 Pulis #EverybodySingPulis #EverybodySingBatas	Sing-Tunog	"Buwan" by Juan Karlos	6											112 secs.	"Para Lang Sa 'Yo" by Aiza Seguerra	"Mas Mabuti Pa" by Janine Berdin	₱150,000	
2	June 4, 2023	100 Pulis #EverybodySingPulis #EverybodySingBatas	Pic-Sing a Broken Song	"Lord Patawad" by Bassilyo	5											112 secs.	"Majika" by Kitchie Nadal	"Tama Na" by Darren Espanto	₱150,000	
2	June 4, 2023	100 Pulis #EverybodySingPulis #EverybodySingBatas	Engli-Sing ang Lyrics	"'Til I Met You" by Angeline Quinto	2											112 secs.	"Magmahal Muli" by Sam Milby and Say Alonzo	"Time In" by Yeng Constantino	₱150,000	
2	June 4, 2023	100 Pulis #EverybodySingPulis #EverybodySingBatas	The ChooSing One	"Walang Kapalit" by KZ Tandingan	9											112 secs.	"Umiibig Na Nga" by April Boy Regino	"Laro" by Autotelic	₱150,000	
2	June 4, 2023	100 Pulis #EverybodySingPulis #EverybodySingBatas	Ayu-Sing Mo	"Mahal Ko o Mahal Ako" by KZ Tandingan	10											112 secs.	"From the Start" by Rachelle Ann Go	"Nanggigigil" by Hagibis	₱150,000	
Guests: Divine Tetay & Petite (episode 1), KZ (episode 2); Re-broadcast date: January 13–14, 2024

Week 2 (June 10–11, 2023)
Episode		Songbayanan	Preliminary Rounds														Jackpot round (Ultimate Everybody GuesSing)		Prize won	Ref.
No.	Airing date	Songbayanan	Game	Song	SONGpu											Timer	Songs		Prize won	Ref.
No.	Airing date	Songbayanan	Game	Song	Row	1	2	3	4	5	6	7	8	9	10	Timer	Songs		Prize won	Ref.
3	June 10, 2023	100 Sanitation Workers #EverybodySingDumi #EverybodySingLinis	Sing in the Blank	"Sana Ay Mahalin Mo Rin Ako" by April Boys	3											80 secs.	"Laging Tapat" by Jolina Magdangal	"Rock Baby Rock" by VST & Co.	₱230,000	
3	June 10, 2023	100 Sanitation Workers #EverybodySingDumi #EverybodySingLinis	Lights, Camera, Act-Sing	"Mr. Dreamboy" by Sheryl Cruz	10											80 secs.	"Iingatan Ka" by Carol Banawa	"Pen Pen De Sarapen"	₱230,000	
3	June 10, 2023	100 Sanitation Workers #EverybodySingDumi #EverybodySingLinis	LipSing	"Simpleng Tao" by Gloc-9	9											80 secs.	"May Minamahal" by Hajji Alejandro	"Anong Nangyari Sa Ating Dalawa" by Aiza Seguerra	₱230,000	
3	June 10, 2023	100 Sanitation Workers #EverybodySingDumi #EverybodySingLinis	A-B-Sing	"You're Still The One" by Shania Twain	2											80 secs.	"Ang Huling El Bimbo" by Eraserheads	"Tila" by Lani Misalucha	₱230,000	
3	June 10, 2023	100 Sanitation Workers #EverybodySingDumi #EverybodySingLinis	ReverSing	"Tatsulok" by Bamboo	5											80 secs.	"Muli" by Rodel Naval	"Masdan Mo Ang Kapaligiran" by Freddie Aguilar	₱230,000	
4	June 11, 2023	100 Sanitation Workers #EverybodySingDumi #EverybodySingLinis	TagaliSing	"Bumalik Ka Na Sa'kin" by Silent Sanctuary	8											95 secs.	"Dear Heart" by Sharon Cuneta	"Lift Up Your Hands" by Basil Valdez	₱230,000	
4	June 11, 2023	100 Sanitation Workers #EverybodySingDumi #EverybodySingLinis	Pic-Sing a Broken Song	"Tuloy Pa Rin Ako" by Side A	7											95 secs.	"Thank You For the Love" by ABS-CBN All Star	"Ililigtas Ka Niya" by Gary Valenciano	₱230,000	
4	June 11, 2023	100 Sanitation Workers #EverybodySingDumi #EverybodySingLinis	Sing-Tunog	"Someday" by Nina	6											95 secs.	"T.L. Ako Sayo" by Cinderella	"Kung Alam Mo Lang" by Lapis	₱230,000	
4	June 11, 2023	100 Sanitation Workers #EverybodySingDumi #EverybodySingLinis	The ChooSing One	"Sana Dalawa Ang Puso Ko" by Bodjie's Law of Gravity	1											95 secs.	"Pagsamo" by Arthur Nery	"Baa Baa Black Sheep"	₱230,000	
4	June 11, 2023	100 Sanitation Workers #EverybodySingDumi #EverybodySingLinis	Ayu-Sing Mo	"Can This Be Love" by Sarah Geronimo	4											95 secs.	"Torpe" by Hungry Young Poets	"Recuerdo de Amor" by Jessa Zaragoza	₱230,000	
Guests: Didong & Petite (episode 3), Nyoy Volante (episode 4); Re-broadcast date: October 28–29, 2023

Week 3 (June 17–18, 2023)
Episode		Songbayanan	Preliminary Rounds														Jackpot round (Ultimate Everybody GuesSing)		Prize won	Ref.
No.	Airing date	Songbayanan	Game	Song	SONGpu											Timer	Songs		Prize won	Ref.
No.	Airing date	Songbayanan	Game	Song	Row	1	2	3	4	5	6	7	8	9	10	Timer	Songs		Prize won	Ref.
5	June 17, 2023	100 Mag-Ama #EverybodySingPapa #EverybodySingAma	Sing in the Blank	"Yugyugan Na" by P.O.T	9											76 secs.	"Mangarap Ka" by After Image	"Paraluman" by Adie	₱2,140,000	
5	June 17, 2023	100 Mag-Ama #EverybodySingPapa #EverybodySingAma	A-B-Sing	"Peksman" by Siakol	4											76 secs.	"Tong Tong Tong Pakitong-Kitong"	"Kaleidoscope World" by Francis Magalona	₱2,140,000	
5	June 17, 2023	100 Mag-Ama #EverybodySingPapa #EverybodySingAma	Lights, Camera, Act-Sing	"Patuloy ang Pangarap" by Angeline Quinto	5											76 secs.	"Better World" by Smokey Mountain	"Kembot" by Amber Davis	₱2,140,000	
5	June 17, 2023	100 Mag-Ama #EverybodySingPapa #EverybodySingAma	LipSing	"Stay" by Carol Banawa	8											76 secs.	"Boy" by Timmy Cruz	"Kulang Ako Kung Wala Ka" by Erik Santos	₱2,140,000	
5	June 17, 2023	100 Mag-Ama #EverybodySingPapa #EverybodySingAma	Ayu-Sing Mo	"Kisapmata" by Rivermaya	7											76 secs.	"Bagong Umaga" by Agsunta	"O Lumapit Ka" by Ella del Rosario	₱2,140,000	
6	June 18, 2023	100 Mag-Ama #EverybodySingPapa #EverybodySingAma	Sing-Tunog	"Harana" by Eraserheads	2											115 secs.	"Sana Kahit Minsan" by Ariel Rivera	"Porque" by Maldita	₱2,140,000	
6	June 18, 2023	100 Mag-Ama #EverybodySingPapa #EverybodySingAma	TagaliSing	"Mahal Kita Walang Iba" by Ogie Alcasid	1											115 secs.	"Tara Lets" by Imago	"You Are The One" by Toni Gonzaga and Sam Milby	₱2,140,000	
6	June 18, 2023	100 Mag-Ama #EverybodySingPapa #EverybodySingAma	The ChooSing One	"Pangarap Ko Ang Ibigin Ka" by Ogie Alcasid	10											115 secs.	"Rock-a-bye Baby"	"Magasin" by Eraserheads	₱2,140,000	
6	June 18, 2023	100 Mag-Ama #EverybodySingPapa #EverybodySingAma	PicSing a Broken Song	"You" by Roselle Nava	3											115 secs.	"Panaginip" by Morissette	"AMAKABOGERA" by Maymay Entrata	₱2,140,000	
6	June 18, 2023	100 Mag-Ama #EverybodySingPapa #EverybodySingAma	ReverSing	"Kailanman" by Introvoys	6											115 secs.	"Paano Ba Ang Magmahal" by Erik Santos and Liezel Garcia	"Oks Lang" by John Roa	₱2,140,000	
Note: This episode is a Fathers' Day special episode. Guests: Beki Velo & Petite (episode 5), Ogie Alcasid (episode 6); Re-broadcast date: July 22–23, 2023

Week 4 (June 24–25, 2023)
Episode		Songbayanan	Preliminary Rounds														Jackpot round (Ultimate Everybody GuesSing)		Prize won	Ref.
No.	Airing date	Songbayanan	Game	Song	SONGpu											Timer	Songs		Prize won	Ref.
No.	Airing date	Songbayanan	Game	Song	Row	1	2	3	4	5	6	7	8	9	10	Timer	Songs		Prize won	Ref.
7	June 24, 2023	100 Manila Fire Survivors #EverybodySingSurvive #EverybodySingHope	Sing in the Blank	"Alapaap" by Eraserheads	5											78 secs.	"Maling Akala" by Brownman Revival	"Tabing Ilog" by Barbie's Cradle	₱2,200,000	
7	June 24, 2023	100 Manila Fire Survivors #EverybodySingSurvive #EverybodySingHope	TagaliSing	"Muling Ibalik" by First Cousins	10											78 secs.	"Bituing Walang Ningning" by Sharon Cuneta	"Bawal Na Gamot" by Willy Garte	₱2,200,000	
7	June 24, 2023	100 Manila Fire Survivors #EverybodySingSurvive #EverybodySingHope	Lights, Camera, Act-Sing	"Sirena" by Gloc-9	1											78 secs.	"Mula sa Puso" by Jude Michael	"Ikaw Ang Miss Universe ng Buhay Ko" by Hotdog	₱2,200,000	
7	June 24, 2023	100 Manila Fire Survivors #EverybodySingSurvive #EverybodySingHope	LipSing	"Nang Dahil sa Pag-ibig" by Tootsie Guevarra	6											78 secs.	"Paminsan Minsan" by Richard Reynoso	"Hahabol-habol" by Bobby Gonzales	₱2,200,000	
7	June 24, 2023	100 Manila Fire Survivors #EverybodySingSurvive #EverybodySingHope	Ayu-Sing Mo	"Uhaw" by Dilaw	9											78 secs.	"Bikining Itim" by Bert Dominic	"Pangarap Ka" by Geneva Cruz	₱2,200,000	
8	June 25, 2023	100 Manila Fire Survivors #EverybodySingSurvive #EverybodySingHope	A-B-Sing	"Ika'y Mahal Pa Rin" by Rockstar 2	8											82 secs.	"Sa Yahweh Ang Sayaw" by Gary Valenciano	"Kahit Kailan" by South Border	₱2,200,000	
8	June 25, 2023	100 Manila Fire Survivors #EverybodySingSurvive #EverybodySingHope	PicSing A Broken Song	"Doo Bi Doo" by APO Hiking Society	3											82 secs.	"Makita Kang Muli" by Sugarfree	"Macho Gwapito" by Rico J. Puno	₱2,200,000	
8	June 25, 2023	100 Manila Fire Survivors #EverybodySingSurvive #EverybodySingHope	Sing-Tunog	"Gusto Ko Nang Bumitaw" by Sheryn Regis	2											82 secs.	"Kung Kailangan Mo Ako" by Rey Valera	"Nosi Balasi" by Sampaguita	₱2,200,000	
8	June 25, 2023	100 Manila Fire Survivors #EverybodySingSurvive #EverybodySingHope	The ChooSing One	"Come In Out of the Rain" by Wendy Moten	7											82 secs.	"Tagumpay Nating Lahat" by Lea Salonga	"Dito Ba" by Kuh Ledesma	₱2,200,000	
8	June 25, 2023	100 Manila Fire Survivors #EverybodySingSurvive #EverybodySingHope	ReverSing	"Mahal na Mahal Kita" by Aegis	4											82 secs.	"Esperanza" by April Boy Regino	"Taxi Driver" by Bassilyo	₱2,200,000	
Note: This group received additional assistance from ABS-CBN Sagip Kapamilya, aside from the prizes they have won. Guests: Beki Velo & Petite (episode 7), Sheryn Regis (episode 8); Re-broadcast date: August 19–20, 2023

Week 5 (July 1–2, 2023)
Episode		Songbayanan	Preliminary Rounds														Jackpot round (Ultimate Everybody GuesSing)		Prize won	Ref.
No.	Airing date	Songbayanan	Game	Song	SONGpu											Timer	Songs		Prize won	Ref.
No.	Airing date	Songbayanan	Game	Song	Row	1	2	3	4	5	6	7	8	9	10	Timer	Songs		Prize won	Ref.
9	July 1, 2023	100 Engaged Couples #EverybodySingEngaged #EverybodySingKasal	Sing in the Blank	"Paano Ang Puso Ko" by April Boy Regino	3											74 secs.	"Kapayapaan" by Tropical Depression	"Magda" by Rico Blanco and Gloc-9	₱290,000	
9	July 1, 2023	100 Engaged Couples #EverybodySingEngaged #EverybodySingKasal	A-B-Sing	"Only Me and You" by Donna Cruz	2											74 secs.	"Babalik Ka Rin" by Gary Valenciano	"May Bukas Pa" by Rico J. Puno	₱290,000	
9	July 1, 2023	100 Engaged Couples #EverybodySingEngaged #EverybodySingKasal	Lights, Camera, Act-Sing	"Baby I Love Your Way" by Big Mountain	9											74 secs.	"KSP (Kulang sa Pansin)" by Rachel Alejandro	"Bulag, Pipi, at Bingi" by Freddie Aguilar	₱290,000	
9	July 1, 2023	100 Engaged Couples #EverybodySingEngaged #EverybodySingKasal	LipSing	"May Minamahal" by Hajji Alejandro	4											74 secs.	"Cool Off" by Session Road	"Prinsesa" by Teeth	₱290,000	
9	July 1, 2023	100 Engaged Couples #EverybodySingEngaged #EverybodySingKasal	Ayu-Sing Mo	"Be My Lady" by Martin Nievera	5											74 secs.	"London Bridge is Falling Down"	"Muli" by Rodel Naval	₱290,000	
10	July 2, 2023	100 Engaged Couples #EverybodySingEngaged #EverybodySingKasal	Engli-Sing ang Lyrics	"You'll Always Be My Number One" by Sarah Geronimo	6											89 secs.	"Wala Na Talaga" by Klarisse De Guzman	"Kaliwete" by Eraserheads	₱290,000	
10	July 2, 2023	100 Engaged Couples #EverybodySingEngaged #EverybodySingKasal	Sing-Tunog	"Si Aida, Si Lorna, o Si Fe" by Marco Sison	1											89 secs.	"Nung Tayo Pa" by Janella Salvador	"Rampa" by Vice Ganda	₱290,000	
10	July 2, 2023	100 Engaged Couples #EverybodySingEngaged #EverybodySingKasal	The ChooSing One	"My Love Will See You Through" by Marco Sison	10											89 secs.	"I-Swing Mo Ako" by Sharon Cuneta	"Mr. Right" by Kim Chiu	₱290,000	
10	July 2, 2023	100 Engaged Couples #EverybodySingEngaged #EverybodySingKasal	PicSing A Broken Song	"Magbalik" by Callalily	7											89 secs.	"Gusto Ko Lamang Sa Buhay" by Itchyworms	"Ipagpatawad Mo" by VST & Co.	₱290,000	
10	July 2, 2023	100 Engaged Couples #EverybodySingEngaged #EverybodySingKasal	ReverSing	"Bulag sa Katotohanan" by Rachel Alejandro	8											89 secs.	"Bakit Nga Ba Mahal" by Lani Misalucha	"Ang Gaan ng Feeling" by Geneva Cruz	₱290,000	
Guests: Beki Velo & Petite (episode 9), Marco Sison (episode 10); Re-broadcast dates: August 12–13, 2023, February 3–4, 2024

Week 6 (July 8–9, 2023)
Episode		Songbayanan	Preliminary Rounds														Jackpot round (Ultimate Everybody GuesSing)		Prize won	Ref.
No.	Airing date	Songbayanan	Game	Song	SONGpu											Timer	Songs		Prize won	Ref.
No.	Airing date	Songbayanan	Game	Song	Row	1	2	3	4	5	6	7	8	9	10	Timer	Songs		Prize won	Ref.
11	July 8, 2023	100 Sari-Sari; Store Sellers #EverybodySingSuki #EverybodySingBenta	Sing in the Blank	"Bilog Na Naman ang Buwan" by Tropical Depression	7											72 secs.	"Paglisan" by Color It Red	"Yesterday's Dream" by 14-K	₱150,000	
11	July 8, 2023	100 Sari-Sari; Store Sellers #EverybodySingSuki #EverybodySingBenta	A-B-Sing	"Falling In Love" by Six Part Invention	4											72 secs.	"Isang Linggong Pag-Ibig" by Imelda Papin	"I Heart You" by Daniel Padilla	₱150,000	
11	July 8, 2023	100 Sari-Sari; Store Sellers #EverybodySingSuki #EverybodySingBenta	Lights, Camera, Act-Sing	"Pumapatak ang Ulan" by APO Hiking Society	1											72 secs.	"Da Coconut Nut" by Smokey Mountain	"Batang Bata Ka Pa" by APO Hiking Society	₱150,000	
11	July 8, 2023	100 Sari-Sari; Store Sellers #EverybodySingSuki #EverybodySingBenta	LipSing	"Meron Ba" by Nikki Valdez	6											72 secs.	"Bongga Ka Day" by Hotdog	"Walang Hanggan" by Ella May Saison	₱150,000	
11	July 8, 2023	100 Sari-Sari; Store Sellers #EverybodySingSuki #EverybodySingBenta	Ayu-Sing Mo	"Paikot-ikot" by Randy Santiago	9											72 secs.	"Gusto Na Kitang Makita" by Session Road	"Ikaw Lang Naman" by Elaine Duran	₱150,000	
12	July 9, 2023	100 Sari-Sari; Store Sellers #EverybodySingSuki #EverybodySingBenta	Pic-Sing a Broken Song	"Let the Love Begin" by Kyla and Jerome John Hughes	2											74 secs.	"Bulong" by Kitchie Nadal	"I'm Feeling Sexy Tonight" by Chona Cruz	₱150,000	
12	July 9, 2023	100 Sari-Sari; Store Sellers #EverybodySingSuki #EverybodySingBenta	TagaliSing	"Mambobola" by Zsazsa Padilla	3											74 secs.	"Annie Batungbakal" by Hotdog	"Ikaw Pala" by Heaven	₱150,000	
12	July 9, 2023	100 Sari-Sari; Store Sellers #EverybodySingSuki #EverybodySingBenta	Sing-Tunog	"Tahanan" by Adie	8											74 secs.	"Don Romantiko" by Vhong Navarro	"Kakaibabe" by Donnalyn Bartolome	₱150,000	
12	July 9, 2023	100 Sari-Sari; Store Sellers #EverybodySingSuki #EverybodySingBenta	The ChooSing One	"Paraluman" by Adie	5											74 secs.	"Cross My Heart" by Sharon Cuneta	"Banal na Aso Santong Kabayo" by Yano	₱150,000	
12	July 9, 2023	100 Sari-Sari; Store Sellers #EverybodySingSuki #EverybodySingBenta	ReverSing	"Umaaraw, Umuulan" by Rivermaya	10											74 secs.	"Tag-araw" by After Image	"Everlasting Love" by The Company	₱150,000	
Guests: Beki Velo & Petite (episode 11), Adie Garcia (episode 12); Re-broadcast date: August 26–27, 2023

Week 7 (July 15–16, 2023)
Episode		Songbayanan	Preliminary Rounds														Jackpot round (Ultimate Everybody GuesSing)		Prize won	Ref.
No.	Airing date	Songbayanan	Game	Song	SONGpu											Timer	Songs		Prize won	Ref.
No.	Airing date	Songbayanan	Game	Song	Row	1	2	3	4	5	6	7	8	9	10	Timer	Songs		Prize won	Ref.
13	July 15, 2023	100 Tattoo & Body; Piercing Artists #EverybodySingTattoo #EverybodySingPiercing	Sing in the Blank	"Sige" by 6cyclemind	3											88 secs.	"Babaero" by Randy Santiago	"Di Bale Na Lang" by Gary Valenciano	₱180,000	
13	July 15, 2023	100 Tattoo & Body; Piercing Artists #EverybodySingTattoo #EverybodySingPiercing	A-B-Sing	"Ako Naman Muna" by Angela Ken	10											88 secs.	"Without You" by Introvoys	"Kundiman" by Silent Sanctuary	₱180,000	
13	July 15, 2023	100 Tattoo & Body; Piercing Artists #EverybodySingTattoo #EverybodySingPiercing	Lights, Camera, Act-Sing	"Mamang Sorbetero" by Celeste Legaspi	9											88 secs.	"Hataw Na" by Gary Valenciano	"Kasalanan Ba" by Menopause	₱180,000	
13	July 15, 2023	100 Tattoo & Body; Piercing Artists #EverybodySingTattoo #EverybodySingPiercing	LipSing	"How Did You Know" by Chiqui Pineda	8											88 secs.	"Nasa Iyo Na Ang Lahat" by Daniel Padilla	"Miss Na Miss Kita" by Father and Sons	₱180,000	
13	July 15, 2023	100 Tattoo & Body; Piercing Artists #EverybodySingTattoo #EverybodySingPiercing	Ayu-Sing Mo	"Ngiti" by Ronnie Liang	1											88 secs.	"Chuva Choo Choo" by Jolina Magdangal	"Hindi Kita Malilimutan" by Basil Valdez	₱180,000	
14	July 16, 2023	100 Tattoo & Body; Piercing Artists #EverybodySingTattoo #EverybodySingPiercing	EngliSing ang Lyrics	"The Sign" by Ace of Base	6											86 secs.	"Muli Mong Mahalin" by April Boys	"Pamela" by Vhong Navarro	₱180,000	
14	July 16, 2023	100 Tattoo & Body; Piercing Artists #EverybodySingTattoo #EverybodySingPiercing	Pic-Sing a Broken Song	"Yakap" by Zack Tabudlo	5											86 secs.	"Malayo Pa Ang Umaga" by Rey Valera	"Begin" by Morisette	₱180,000	
14	July 16, 2023	100 Tattoo & Body; Piercing Artists #EverybodySingTattoo #EverybodySingPiercing	Sing-Tunog	"Paniwalaan Mo" by Dingdong Avanzado	4											86 secs.	"Love Team" by Itchyworms	"Una At Huling Mamahalin" by Louie Heredia	₱180,000	
14	July 16, 2023	100 Tattoo & Body; Piercing Artists #EverybodySingTattoo #EverybodySingPiercing	The ChooSing One	"Makapiling Ka Sana" by Dingdong Avanzado	7											86 secs.	"Paraiso" by Smokey Mountain	"Elesi" by Rivermaya	₱180,000	
14	July 16, 2023	100 Tattoo & Body; Piercing Artists #EverybodySingTattoo #EverybodySingPiercing	ReverSing	"Dahil Tanging Ikaw" by Jaya	2											86 secs.	"FOJ is Here 2 Rock U" by F.O.J	"Luha" by Aegis	₱180,000	
Guests: Beki Velo & Petite (episode 13), Dingdong Avanzado (episode 14); Re-broadcast date: October 7–8, 2023

Week 8 (July 29–30, 2023)
Episode		Songbayanan	Preliminary Rounds														Jackpot round (Ultimate Everybody GuesSing)		Prize won	Ref.
No.	Airing date	Songbayanan	Game	Song	SONGpu											Timer	Songs		Prize won	Ref.
No.	Airing date	Songbayanan	Game	Song	Row	1	2	3	4	5	6	7	8	9	10	Timer	Songs		Prize won	Ref.
15	July 29, 2023	100 Nurses #EverybodySingNurse #EverybodySingGamot	Sing in the Blank	"Para Sa'yo" by Parokya ni Edgar	1											72 secs.	"Katawan" by Hagibis	"Kiss Kiss" by VST & Co.	₱190,000	
15	July 29, 2023	100 Nurses #EverybodySingNurse #EverybodySingGamot	A-B-Sing	"Sino Nga Ba Siya" by Sarah Geronimo	4											72 secs.	"Pagsubok" by Orient Pearl	"Paano" by Heaven	₱190,000	
15	July 29, 2023	100 Nurses #EverybodySingNurse #EverybodySingGamot	Lights, Camera, Act-Sing	"Hold On" by Neocolours	3											72 secs.	"Halik" by Aegis	"Before I Let You Go" by Freestyle	₱190,000	
15	July 29, 2023	100 Nurses #EverybodySingNurse #EverybodySingGamot	LipSing	"Paubaya" by Moira Dela Torre	2											72 secs.	"Nanghihinayang" by Jeremiah	"Estudyante Blues" by Freddie Aguilar	₱190,000	
15	July 29, 2023	100 Nurses #EverybodySingNurse #EverybodySingGamot	Ayu-Sing Mo	"Bakit Ba" by Siakol	7											72 secs.	"Ate Sandali" by Maris Racal	"So It's You" by Raymond Lauchengco	₱190,000	
16	July 30, 2023	100 Nurses #EverybodySingNurse #EverybodySingGamot	TagaliSing	"Marikit" by Juan Caoile (feat. Kyleswish)	8											90 secs.	"Alumni Homecoming" by Parokya ni Edgar	"Beer" by Itchyworms	₱190,000	
16	July 30, 2023	100 Nurses #EverybodySingNurse #EverybodySingGamot	PicSing a Broken Song	"Sembreak" by Eraserheads	5											90 secs.	"Ibigay Mo Na" by Jessa Zaragoza	"Magdamag" by Maymay Entrata	₱190,000	
16	July 30, 2023	100 Nurses #EverybodySingNurse #EverybodySingGamot	Sing-Tunog	"Pagdating ng Panahon" by Ice Seguerra	10											90 secs.	"Tsinelas" by Yano	"Wag Mo Na Sang Isipin" by Gary Valenciano	₱190,000	
16	July 30, 2023	100 Nurses #EverybodySingNurse #EverybodySingGamot	The ChooSing One	"Power of Two" by Indigo Girls	9											90 secs.	"Your Love" by Alamid	"Tanging Dahilan" by Belle Mariano	₱190,000	
16	July 30, 2023	100 Nurses #EverybodySingNurse #EverybodySingGamot	ReverSing	"Pusong Ligaw" by Jericho Rosales	6											90 secs.	"I'll Never Go" by Nexus	"Ako'y Sayo, Ika'y Akin Lamang" by First Circle	₱190,000	
Guests: Beki Velo & Petite (episode 15), Ice Seguerra (episode 16); Re-broadcast date: October 21–22, 2023

Week 9 (August 5–6, 2023)
Episode		Songbayanan	Preliminary Rounds														Jackpot round (Ultimate Everybody GuesSing)		Prize won	Ref.
No.	Airing date	Songbayanan	Game	Song	SONGpu											Timer	Songs		Prize won	Ref.
No.	Airing date	Songbayanan	Game	Song	Row	1	2	3	4	5	6	7	8	9	10	Timer	Songs		Prize won	Ref.
17	August 5, 2023	100 Government; Employees #EverybodySingService #EverybodySingGovernment	Sing in the Blank	"Ikaw Lang ang Aking Mahal" by Brownman Revival	5											80 secs.	"Ewan" by APO Hiking Society	"Sana Ay Ikaw Na Nga" by Basil Valdez	₱180,000	
17	August 5, 2023	100 Government; Employees #EverybodySingService #EverybodySingGovernment	A-B-Sing	"Paligoy-ligoy" by Nadine Lustre	8											80 secs.	"Sasamahan Kita" by Loisa Andalio	"Buko" by Jireh Lim	₱180,000	
17	August 5, 2023	100 Government; Employees #EverybodySingService #EverybodySingGovernment	Lights, Camera, ActSing	"Tadhana" by Up Dharma Down	1											80 secs.	"Oh Babe" by Singsing	"Mahal Pa Rin Kita" by Rockstar	₱180,000	
17	August 5, 2023	100 Government; Employees #EverybodySingService #EverybodySingGovernment	LipSing	"We Belong" by Toni Gonzaga	4											80 secs.	"Ikaw Ang Miss Universe ng Buhay Ko" by Hotdog	"Sasagipin Kita" by Darren Espanto	₱180,000	
17	August 5, 2023	100 Government; Employees #EverybodySingService #EverybodySingGovernment	Ayu-Sing Mo	"Hanggang Ngayon" by Ogie Alcasid & Regine Velasquez	9											80 secs.	"Kumusta Ka" by Rey Valera	"Disco Araw-Araw" by Pasionada	₱180,000	
18	August 6, 2023	100 Government; Employees #EverybodySingService #EverybodySingGovernment	TagaliSing	"Byahe" by John Roa	10											102 secs.	"Mr. DJ" by Sharon Cuneta	"Matibay" by Jona	₱180,000	
18	August 6, 2023	100 Government; Employees #EverybodySingService #EverybodySingGovernment	PicSing a Broken Song	"Rain" by Boy Mondragon	3											102 secs.	"Sa Aking Puso" by Ariel Rivera	"Tanging Ikaw" by Kyla	₱180,000	
18	August 6, 2023	100 Government; Employees #EverybodySingService #EverybodySingGovernment	Sing-Tunog	"Bakit Ako Mahihiya" by Didith Reyes	6											102 secs.	"Ulan" by Rivermaya	"Magkaisa" by Virna Lisa	₱180,000	
18	August 6, 2023	100 Government; Employees #EverybodySingService #EverybodySingGovernment	The ChooSing One	"Kung Ako Na Lang Sana" by Bituin Escalante	7											102 secs.	"Sayang" by Parokya ni Edgar	"Dahil Mahal na Mahal Kita" by Roselle Nava	₱180,000	
18	August 6, 2023	100 Government; Employees #EverybodySingService #EverybodySingGovernment	ReverSing	"Kung Gusto Mo, Gusto Ko Pa" by APO Hiking Society	2											102 secs.	"Laki sa Layaw" by Mike Hanopol	"Salamat" by Yeng Constantino	₱180,000	
Guests: Beki Velo & Petite (episode 17), Bituin Escalante (episode 18); Re-broadcast date: November 4–5, 2023

Week 10 (September 2–3, 2023)
Episode		Songbayanan	Preliminary Rounds														Jackpot round (Ultimate Everybody GuesSing)		Prize won	Ref.
No.	Airing date	Songbayanan	Game	Song	SONGpu											Timer	Songs		Prize won	Ref.
No.	Airing date	Songbayanan	Game	Song	Row	1	2	3	4	5	6	7	8	9	10	Timer	Songs		Prize won	Ref.
19	September 2, 2023	100 Mangangalakal #EverybodySingKalakal #EverybodySingSideCar	Sing in the Blank	"Jopay" by Mayonnaise	9											74 secs.	"Liwanag sa Dilim" by Rivermaya	"Jingle Bells"	₱2,200,000	
19	September 2, 2023	100 Mangangalakal #EverybodySingKalakal #EverybodySingSideCar	A-B-Sing	"Natatawa Ako" by Gabriella	10											74 secs.	"Legs" by Hagibis	"Ngayon at Kailanman" by Basil Valdez	₱2,200,000	
19	September 2, 2023	100 Mangangalakal #EverybodySingKalakal #EverybodySingSideCar	Lights, Camera, Act-Sing	"Blue Jeans" by APO Hiking Society	7											74 secs.	"Karakaraka" by Vice Ganda	"Wala Na; Bang Pag-ibig" by Jaya	₱2,200,000	
19	September 2, 2023	100 Mangangalakal #EverybodySingKalakal #EverybodySingSideCar	LipSing	"Sana Maulit Muli" by Gary Valenciano	2											74 secs.	"Titser's Enemy; No. 1" by Juan dela Cruz	"Beh, Buti Nga" by Hotdog	₱2,200,000	
19	September 2, 2023	100 Mangangalakal #EverybodySingKalakal #EverybodySingSideCar	Ayu-Sing Mo	"Kasalanan" by Orient Pearl	1											74 secs.	"Umiiyak ang Puso" by April Boy Regino	"Don't Know What To Do, Don't Know What To Say" by Ric Segreto	₱2,200,000	
20	September 3, 2023	100 Mangangalakal #EverybodySingKalakal #EverybodySingSideCar	TagaliSing	"Torete" by Moonstar88	4											96 secs.	"Hindi Na Nga" by This Band	"Maging Sino Ka Man" by Rey Valera	₱2,200,000	
20	September 3, 2023	100 Mangangalakal #EverybodySingKalakal #EverybodySingSideCar	PicSing a Broken Song	"Huwag Kang Matakot" by Eraserheads	5											96 secs.	"Ikaw Ang Aking Mahal" by VST & Co.	"Manok ni San Pedro" by Max Surban	₱2,200,000	
20	September 3, 2023	100 Mangangalakal #EverybodySingKalakal #EverybodySingSideCar	Sing Tunog	"Buko" by Jireh Lim	8											96 secs.	"Stay" by Cueshe	"Alam Mo Ba" by The Company	₱2,200,000	
20	September 3, 2023	100 Mangangalakal #EverybodySingKalakal #EverybodySingSideCar	The ChooSing One	"Magkabilang Mundo" by Jireh Lim	3											96 secs.	"Araw-Araw" by Ben&Ben	"Happy Birthday"	₱2,200,000	
20	September 3, 2023	100 Mangangalakal #EverybodySingKalakal #EverybodySingSideCar	ReverSing	"Totoy Bibo" by Vhong Navarro	6											96 secs.	"Tulak ng Bibig, Kabig ng Dibdib" by Cinderella	"Kabataan Para sa Kinabukasan" by Francis Magalona	₱2,200,000	
Guests: Beki Velo & Petite (episode 19), Jireh Lim (episode 20); Re-broadcast date: December 23–24, 2023

Week 11 (September 9–10, 2023)
Episode		Songbayanan	Preliminary Rounds														Jackpot round (Ultimate Everybody GuesSing)		Prize won	Ref.
No.	Airing date	Songbayanan	Game	Song	SONGpu											Timer	Songs		Prize won	Ref.
No.	Airing date	Songbayanan	Game	Song	Row	1	2	3	4	5	6	7	8	9	10	Timer	Songs		Prize won	Ref.
21	September 9, 2023	100 Dancers #EverybodySingSayaw #EverybodySingHataw	Sing in the Blank	"Sa'yo" by Silent Sanctuary	9											68 secs.	"Next in Line" by Afterimage	"Pakisabi Na Lang" by The Company	₱130,000	
21	September 9, 2023	100 Dancers #EverybodySingSayaw #EverybodySingHataw	A-B-Sing	"Maybe" by Neocolours	10											68 secs.	"Before I Let You Go" by Freestyle	"Binalewala" by Michael Dutchi Libranda	₱130,000	
21	September 9, 2023	100 Dancers #EverybodySingSayaw #EverybodySingHataw	Lights, Camera, Act-Sing	"Para-Paraan" by Nadine Lustre	3											68 secs.	"Huwag Mo Nang Itanong" by Eraserheads	"Boom Panes" by Vice Ganda	₱130,000	
21	September 9, 2023	100 Dancers #EverybodySingSayaw #EverybodySingHataw	LipSing	"Penge Naman Ako N'yan" by Itchyworms	6											68 secs.	"Na Na Na" by BINI	"Limang Dipang Tao" by Ryan Cayabyab	₱130,000	
21	September 9, 2023	100 Dancers #EverybodySingSayaw #EverybodySingHataw	Ayu-Sing Mo	"Araw-Gabi" by Nonoy Zuniga	5											68 secs.	"Doon Lang" by Nonoy Zuñiga	"Firewoman" by Hungry Young Poets	₱130,000	
22	September 10, 2023	100 Dancers #EverybodySingSayaw #EverybodySingHataw	TagaliSing	"Tala" by Sarah Geronimo	4											82 secs.	"'Di Lang Ikaw" by Juris	"So Much In Love" by F.O.J	₱130,000	
22	September 10, 2023	100 Dancers #EverybodySingSayaw #EverybodySingHataw	Pic-Sing a Broken Song	"Parting Time" by Rockstar	1											82 secs.	"Star ng Pasko" by ABS-CBN Music All Star	"For He's a Jolly Good Fellow"	₱130,000	
22	September 10, 2023	100 Dancers #EverybodySingSayaw #EverybodySingHataw	Sing-Tunog	"Kailan" by Smokey Mountain	2											82 secs.	"Awitin Mo, Isasayaw Ko" by VST & Co.	"Mahal Kita, Mahal Mo Siya, Mahal Niya'y Iba" by Sharon Cuneta	₱130,000	
22	September 10, 2023	100 Dancers #EverybodySingSayaw #EverybodySingHataw	The ChooSing One	"Anak ng Pasig" by Geneva Cruz	7											82 secs.	"Superhero" by Rocksteddy	"Pinoy Ako" by Orange & Lemons	₱130,000	
22	September 10, 2023	100 Dancers #EverybodySingSayaw #EverybodySingHataw	ReverSing	"Sana'y Wala Nang Wakas" by Sharon Cuneta	8											82 secs.	"Awit ng Pangarap" by Yeng Constantino	"Balisong" by Rivermaya	₱130,000	
Guests: Beki Velo & Petite (episode 21), Geneva Cruz (episode 22)

Week 12 (September 16–17, 2023)
Episode		Songbayanan	Preliminary Rounds														Jackpot round (Ultimate Everybody GuesSing)		Prize won	Ref.
No.	Airing date	Songbayanan	Game	Song	SONGpu											Timer	Songs		Prize won	Ref.
No.	Airing date	Songbayanan	Game	Song	Row	1	2	3	4	5	6	7	8	9	10	Timer	Songs		Prize won	Ref.
23	September 16, 2023	100 2023; College Graduates #EverybodySingCollege #EverybodySingGraduate	Sing in the Blank	"Iskul Bukol" by Tito, Vic, and Joey	3											46 secs.	"So Many Questions" by Side A	"Kabataang Pinoy" by Itchyworms	₱210,000	
23	September 16, 2023	100 2023; College Graduates #EverybodySingCollege #EverybodySingGraduate	A-B-Sing	"'Di Na Babalik" by This Band	4											46 secs.	"Wansapanataym" by Nyoy Volante	"Oh My Darling, Clementine"	₱210,000	
23	September 16, 2023	100 2023; College Graduates #EverybodySingCollege #EverybodySingGraduate	Lights, Camera, Act-Sing	"Saranggola ni Pepe" by Celeste Legaspi	1											46 secs.	"Paano Kung Naging Tayo" by Jayda	"Langit Na Naman" by Hotdog	₱210,000	
23	September 16, 2023	100 2023; College Graduates #EverybodySingCollege #EverybodySingGraduate	LipSing	"Ikaw Pa Rin Ang Mamahalin" by April Boys	2											46 secs.	"Bakit Papa" by Sexbomb Girls	"Reach for the Sky" by Sarah Geronimo	₱210,000	
23	September 16, 2023	100 2023; College Graduates #EverybodySingCollege #EverybodySingGraduate	Ayu-Sing Mo	"Raining in Manila" by Lola Amour	9											46 secs.	"Parang Tayo Pero Hindi" by Angeline Quinto & Michael Pangilinan	"Bye Bye Na" by Rico Blanco	₱210,000	
24	September 17, 2023	100 2023; College Graduates #EverybodySingCollege #EverybodySingGraduate	EngliSing ang Lyrics	"A Very Special Love" by Maureen McGovern	10											98 secs.	"Mundo" by IV of Spades	"Paalam" by Moira Dela Torre & Ben&Ben	₱210,000	
24	September 17, 2023	100 2023; College Graduates #EverybodySingCollege #EverybodySingGraduate	PicSing a Broken Song	"Kikay" by Viva Hotbabes	5											98 secs.	"I" by 6cyclemind	"Hanggang Wala Nang Bukas" by Ebe Dancel	₱210,000	
24	September 17, 2023	100 2023; College Graduates #EverybodySingCollege #EverybodySingGraduate	Sing-Tunog	"Chinito" by Yeng Constantino	8											98 secs.	"Walang Kapalit" by Rey Valera	"Scared to Death" by KZ Tandingan	₱210,000	
24	September 17, 2023	100 2023; College Graduates #EverybodySingCollege #EverybodySingGraduate	The ChooSing One	"Ikaw" by Yeng Constantino	7											98 secs.	"Never Give Up" by Andrea Brillantes	"We Wish You a Merry Christmas"	₱210,000	
24	September 17, 2023	100 2023; College Graduates #EverybodySingCollege #EverybodySingGraduate	ReverSing	"Kailan" by Eraserheads	6											98 secs.	"Marry Me, Marry You" by Darren Espanto	"Habang May Buhay" by Afterimage	₱210,000	
Guests: Beki Velo & Petite (episode 23), Yeng Constantino (episode 24); Re-broadcast date: November 11–12, 2023

Week 13 (September 23–24, 2023)
Episode		Songbayanan	Preliminary Rounds														Jackpot round (Ultimate Everybody GuesSing)		Prize won	Ref.
No.	Airing date	Songbayanan	Game	Song	SONGpu											Timer	Songs		Prize won	Ref.
No.	Airing date	Songbayanan	Game	Song	Row	1	2	3	4	5	6	7	8	9	10	Timer	Songs		Prize won	Ref.
25	September 23, 2023	100 Pawnshop & Money Remittance Tellers #EverybodySingSanglaan #EverybodySingPadala	Sing in the Blank	"Panalangin" by APO Hiking Society	5											92 secs.	"Hanggang Sa Dulo Ng Walang Hanggan" by Basil Valdez	"How Could You Say You Love Me" by Sarah Geronimo	₱150,000	
25	September 23, 2023	100 Pawnshop & Money Remittance Tellers #EverybodySingSanglaan #EverybodySingPadala	A-B-Sing	"Kabilang Buhay" by Bandang Lapis	8											92 secs.	"Tindahan ni Aling Nena" by Eraserheads	"Hindi Na Magbabago" by Erik Santos	₱150,000	
25	September 23, 2023	100 Pawnshop & Money Remittance Tellers #EverybodySingSanglaan #EverybodySingPadala	Lights, Camera, Act-Sing	"Lipad ng Pangarap" by Dessa	1											92 secs.	"Ako Ay Pilipino" by Kuh Ledesma	"Good Boy" by Blakdyak	₱150,000	
25	September 23, 2023	100 Pawnshop & Money Remittance Tellers #EverybodySingSanglaan #EverybodySingPadala	LipSing	"Kung Mawawala Ka" by Ogie Alcasid & Karylle	4											92 secs.	"Ngayong Pasko Magniningning ang Pilipino" by ABS-CBN Music All Star	"OHA (Kaya Mo Ba 'To?)" by Enrique Gil	₱150,000	
25	September 23, 2023	100 Pawnshop & Money Remittance Tellers #EverybodySingSanglaan #EverybodySingPadala	Ayu-Sing Mo	"Tuliro" by Spongecola	9											92 secs.	"Saan Darating ang Umaga" by Raymond Lauchengco	"Ale" by Richard Reynoso	₱150,000	
26	September 24, 2023	100 Pawnshop & Money Remittance Tellers #EverybodySingSanglaan #EverybodySingPadala	TagaliSing	"Himala" by Rivermaya	2											64 secs.	"Natataranta" by James Reid	"Your Universe" by Rico Blanco	₱150,000	
26	September 24, 2023	100 Pawnshop & Money Remittance Tellers #EverybodySingSanglaan #EverybodySingPadala	PicSing a Broken Song	"'Wag Kang Pabebe" by Vice Ganda	7											64 secs.	"Magkasuyo Buong Gabi" by Rico J. Puno and Elisa Chan	"Ikaw Lamang" by Janno Gibbs & Jaya	₱150,000	
26	September 24, 2023	100 Pawnshop & Money Remittance Tellers #EverybodySingSanglaan #EverybodySingPadala	Sing-Tunog	"Muli" by Rodel Naval	6											64 secs.	"Dulce Tirah-Tirah" by Blanktape & Diorap	"Imahe" by Magnus Haven	₱150,000	
26	September 24, 2023	100 Pawnshop & Money Remittance Tellers #EverybodySingSanglaan #EverybodySingPadala	The ChooSing One	"Paano Na Kaya" by Bugoy Drilon	3											64 secs.	"Usahay" by Pilita Corrales	"This Love Is Like" by Toni Gonzaga	₱150,000	
26	September 24, 2023	100 Pawnshop & Money Remittance Tellers #EverybodySingSanglaan #EverybodySingPadala	ReverSing	"Munting Pangarap" by Aegis	10											64 secs.	"Twelve Days of Christmas"	"Simpleng Tulad Mo" by Daniel Padilla	₱150,000	
Guests: Beki Velo & Petite (episode 25), Bugoy Drilon (episode 26); Re-broadcast date: December 9–10, 2023

Week 14 (September 30–October 1, 2023)
Episode		Songbayanan	Preliminary Rounds														Jackpot round (Ultimate Everybody GuesSing)		Prize won	Ref.
No.	Airing date	Songbayanan	Game	Song	SONGpu											Timer	Songs		Prize won	Ref.
No.	Airing date	Songbayanan	Game	Song	Row	1	2	3	4	5	6	7	8	9	10	Timer	Songs		Prize won	Ref.
27	September 30, 2023	100 Band Members #EverybodySingBanda #EverybodySingGig	Sing in the Blank	"Making Love Out of Nothing at All" by Air Supply	7											72 secs.	"Langis at Tubig" by Sharon Cuneta	"Babalik Sa'yo" by Moira Dela Torre	₱170,000	
27	September 30, 2023	100 Band Members #EverybodySingBanda #EverybodySingGig	A-B-Sing	"Kung Sakali" by Michael Pangilinan	6											72 secs.	"Ang Sa Iyo Ay Akin" by Aegis	"Bawal Lumabas (The; Classroom Song)" by Kim Chiu	₱170,000	
27	September 30, 2023	100 Band Members #EverybodySingBanda #EverybodySingGig	Lights, Camera, Act-Sing	"Eme" by Moira Dela Torre	9											72 secs.	"Song for the Suspect" by Franco	"Migraine" by Moonstar88	₱170,000	
27	September 30, 2023	100 Band Members #EverybodySingBanda #EverybodySingGig	LipSing	"You Won't See Me Crying" by Gerry Paraiso	8											72 secs.	"O Pag-ibig" by Bailey May & Ylona Garcia	"Ang Boyfriend; Kong Baduy" by Cinderella	₱170,000	
27	September 30, 2023	100 Band Members #EverybodySingBanda #EverybodySingGig	Ayu-Sing Mo	"Tensionado" by Soapdish	5											72 secs.	"Lumang Tugtugin" by Iñigo Pascual	"Say You'll Never Go" by Neocolours	₱170,000	
28	October 1, 2023	100 Band Members #EverybodySingBanda #EverybodySingGig	TagaliSing	"Pagbigyang Muli" by Erik Santos & Regine Velasquez	4											102 secs.	"Isang Bandila" by Rivermaya	"Ako Na Lang" by Angeline Quinto	₱170,000	
28	October 1, 2023	100 Band Members #EverybodySingBanda #EverybodySingGig	PicSing a Broken Song	"The Spageti Song" by Sexbomb Girls (feat. Joey de Leon)	1											102 secs.	"Feel Good Pilipinas" by BGYO & KZ Tandingan	"Jeepney Love Story" by Yeng Constantino	₱170,000	
28	October 1, 2023	100 Band Members #EverybodySingBanda #EverybodySingGig	Sing-Tunog	"Araw-Araw" by Ben&Ben	10											102 secs.	"Ang Ganda Ko" by Sandara Park	"Bugambilya" by Belle Mariano	₱170,000	
28	October 1, 2023	100 Band Members #EverybodySingBanda #EverybodySingGig	The ChooSing One	"Pagtingin" by Ben&Ben	3											102 secs.	"Aking Prinsesa" by Gimme 5	"Paano Kita Mapasasalamatan?" by Kuh Ledesma	₱170,000	
28	October 1, 2023	100 Band Members #EverybodySingBanda #EverybodySingGig	ReverSing	"Akin Ka Na Lang" by Morissette	2											102 secs.	"O Come, All Ye Faithful"	"Kahit Na Malayo Ka" by Piolo Pascual	₱170,000	
Guests: Beki Velo & Petite (episode 27), Paolo & Miguel Benjamin of Ben&Ben (episode 28); Re-broadcast date: December 16–17, 2023

Week 15 (October 14–15, 2023)
Episode		Songbayanan	Preliminary Rounds														Jackpot round (Ultimate Everybody GuesSing)		Prize won	Ref.
No.	Airing date	Songbayanan	Game	Song	SONGpu											Timer	Songs		Prize won	Ref.
No.	Airing date	Songbayanan	Game	Song	Row	1	2	3	4	5	6	7	8	9	10	Timer	Songs		Prize won	Ref.
29	October 14, 2023	100 Taguig Tenement Community #EverybodySingTheTenement #EverybodySingTenementCourt	Sing in the Blank	"Pasko sa Pinas" by Yeng Constantino	3											82 secs.	"214" by Rivermaya	"This Guy's In Love; With You Pare" by Chito Miranda	₱140,000	
29	October 14, 2023	100 Taguig Tenement Community #EverybodySingTheTenement #EverybodySingTenementCourt	A-B-Sing	"Sayang Na Sayang" by Aegis	8											82 secs.	"Ikaw at Ako" by Moira & Jason	"Tag-Ulan" by Afterimage	₱140,000	
29	October 14, 2023	100 Taguig Tenement Community #EverybodySingTheTenement #EverybodySingTenementCourt	Lights, Camera, Act-Sing	"Anak" by Freddie Aguilar	1											82 secs.	"Crazy Love" by Kim Chiu	"Kung 'Di Na Ako" by Agsunta	₱140,000	
29	October 14, 2023	100 Taguig Tenement Community #EverybodySingTheTenement #EverybodySingTenementCourt	LipSing	"Kahit Habang Buhay" by Smokey Mountain	6											82 secs.	"Nasa Puso" by Janine Berdin	"Kahit Ayaw Mo Na" by This Band	₱140,000	
29	October 14, 2023	100 Taguig Tenement Community #EverybodySingTheTenement #EverybodySingTenementCourt	Ayu-Sing Mo	"Marry Your Daughter" by Brian McKnight Jr.	9											82 secs.	"Bakit Mo Ako Iniwan" by Jessa Zaragosa	"Kahit Gaano Kalaki" by Alynna	₱140,000	
30	October 15, 2023	100 Taguig Tenement Community #EverybodySingTheTenement #EverybodySingTenementCourt	TagaliSing	"Pangako" by Kindred Garden	10											82 secs.	"Tayo Na Lang" by Michael Pangilinan	"Bakit Lumuluha" by KZ Tandingan	₱140,000	
30	October 15, 2023	100 Taguig Tenement Community #EverybodySingTheTenement #EverybodySingTenementCourt	PicSing a Broken Song	"Catriona" by Matthaios	7											82 secs.	"Philippine Geography" by Yoyoy Villame	"Sana'y Magbalik" by Jovit Baldivino	₱140,000	
30	October 15, 2023	100 Taguig Tenement Community #EverybodySingTheTenement #EverybodySingTenementCourt	Sing-Tunog	"Bakit Ba Ikaw" by Khel Pangilinan	4											82 secs.	"Overdrive" by Eraserheads	"Dahil Sa'yo" by Iñigo Pascual	₱140,000	
30	October 15, 2023	100 Taguig Tenement Community #EverybodySingTheTenement #EverybodySingTenementCourt	The ChooSing One	"Hanggang Kailan" by Khel Pangilinan	5											82 secs.	"You'll Be Safe Here" by Rivermaya	"Friend of Mine" by Odette Quesada	₱140,000	
30	October 15, 2023	100 Taguig Tenement Community #EverybodySingTheTenement #EverybodySingTenementCourt	ReverSing	"Di Ba't Ikaw" by Jessa Zaragoza	2											82 secs.	"Kung Alam Mo Lang" by Bandang Lapis	"Sampung Mga Daliri"	₱140,000	
Guests: Beki Velo & Petite (episode 29), Khel Pangilinan (episode 30); Re-broadcast date: January 6–7, 2024

Week 16 (November 18–19, 2023)
Episode		Songbayanan	Preliminary Rounds														Jackpot round (Ultimate Everybody GuesSing)		Prize won	Ref.
No.	Airing date	Songbayanan	Game	Song	SONGpu											Timer	Songs		Prize won	Ref.
No.	Airing date	Songbayanan	Game	Song	Row	1	2	3	4	5	6	7	8	9	10	Timer	Songs		Prize won	Ref.
31	November 18, 2023	100 Pharmacists & Botika Employees #EverybodySingMedicine #EverybodySingReseta	Sing in the Blank	"Minsan" by Eraserheads	3											74 secs.	"Laguna" by Sampaguita	"Mabagal" by Daniel Padilla & Moira Dela Torre	₱2,080,000	
31	November 18, 2023	100 Pharmacists & Botika Employees #EverybodySingMedicine #EverybodySingReseta	A-B-Sing	"Loving You" by Ric Segreto	10											74 secs.	"Family is Love" by ABS-CBN Music All Star	"So Slow" by Freestyle	₱2,080,000	
31	November 18, 2023	100 Pharmacists & Botika Employees #EverybodySingMedicine #EverybodySingReseta	Lights, Camera, Act-Sing	"Ang Tipo Kong Lalake" by DJ Alvaro	1											74 secs.	"Dahan-Dahan" by Maja Salvador	"Forever's Not Enough" by Sarah Geronimo	₱2,080,000	
31	November 18, 2023	100 Pharmacists & Botika Employees #EverybodySingMedicine #EverybodySingReseta	LipSing	"Halukay Ube" by Sexbomb Girls	8											74 secs.	"Tuloy Pa Rin" by Neocolours	"Hanggang Kailan" by Orange and Lemons	₱2,080,000	
31	November 18, 2023	100 Pharmacists & Botika Employees #EverybodySingMedicine #EverybodySingReseta	Ayu-Sing Mo	"Alipin" by Shamrock	9											74 secs.	"Jeepney" by Spongecola	"Hatid Sundo" by Gimme 5	₱2,080,000	
32	November 19, 2023	100 Pharmacists & Botika Employees #EverybodySingMedicine #EverybodySingReseta	TagaliSing	"Ang Pag-Ibig; Kong Ito" by Leah Navarro	2											80 secs.	"Stars" by Callalily	"Best Time" by BGYO	₱2,080,000	
32	November 19, 2023	100 Pharmacists & Botika Employees #EverybodySingMedicine #EverybodySingReseta	PicSing a Broken Song	"Long Hair" by Weedd	7											80 secs.	"Panaginip Lang" by Alex Gonzaga	"Dati" by Sam Concepcion & Tippy dos Santos feat. Quest	₱2,080,000	
32	November 19, 2023	100 Pharmacists & Botika Employees #EverybodySingMedicine #EverybodySingReseta	Sing-Tunog	"Malaya" by Moira Dela Torre	6											80 secs.	"Sorry Na, Pwede Ba?" by Rey Valera	"Push Mo 'Yan Te" by Vice Ganda & Regine Velasquez	₱2,080,000	
32	November 19, 2023	100 Pharmacists & Botika Employees #EverybodySingMedicine #EverybodySingReseta	The ChooSing One	"Babalik Sa'yo" by Moira Dela Torre	5											80 secs.	"Bring Me Down" by Rivermaya	"Beh, Buti Nga" by Hotdog	₱2,080,000	
32	November 19, 2023	100 Pharmacists & Botika Employees #EverybodySingMedicine #EverybodySingReseta	ReverSing	"Pwede Ba" by Soapdish	4											80 secs.	"Sukob Na" by 1728	"Mag-Exercise Tayo" by Yoyoy Villame	₱2,080,000	
Guests: Beki Velo & Didong (episode 31), Moira (episode 32); Re-broadcast date: December 30–31, 2023

Week 17 (November 25–26, 2023)
Episode		Songbayanan	Preliminary Rounds														Jackpot round (Ultimate Everybody GuesSing)		Prize won	Ref.
No.	Airing date	Songbayanan	Game	Song	SONGpu											Timer	Songs		Prize won	Ref.
No.	Airing date	Songbayanan	Game	Song	Row	1	2	3	4	5	6	7	8	9	10	Timer	Songs		Prize won	Ref.
33	November; 25, 2023	100 Solo Parents #EverybodySingSolo #EverybodySingParent	Sing in the Blank	"Hahabol-Habol" by Victor Wood	5											90 secs.	"Wala Na Bang Pag-Ibig" by Jaya	"Pare, Mahal Mo Raw Ako" by Michael Pangilinan	₱270,000	
33	November; 25, 2023	100 Solo Parents #EverybodySingSolo #EverybodySingParent	A-B-Sing	"Kathang Isip" by Ben&Ben	8											90 secs.	"Mobe" by Enrique Gil	"Tingnan Mo Naman Ako" by Jolina Magdangal	₱270,000	
33	November; 25, 2023	100 Solo Parents #EverybodySingSolo #EverybodySingParent	Lights, Camera, Act-Sing	"Dadalhin" by Regine Velasquez	1											90 secs.	"Isa Lang" by Arthur Nery	"Mahal Kita Pero" by Janella Salvador	₱270,000	
33	November; 25, 2023	100 Solo Parents #EverybodySingSolo #EverybodySingParent	LipSing	"Muntik Na Kitang Minahal" by The Company	6											90 secs.	"Forevermore" by Side A	"No Touch" by Juan Dela Cruz Band	₱270,000	
33	November; 25, 2023	100 Solo Parents #EverybodySingSolo #EverybodySingParent	Ayu-Sing; Mo	"Ikaw Sana" by Ogie Alcasid	3											90 secs.	"Ulan ng Kahapon" by Klarisse de Guzman	"Ang Buhay Ko" by Aegis	₱270,000	
34	November; 26, 2023	100 Solo Parents #EverybodySingSolo #EverybodySingParent	EngliSing ang Lyrics	"Leaving on a Jetplane" by John Denver	2											118 secs.	"'Til My Heartaches End" by Ella May Saison	"Pag-Ibig Ang Piliin" by Moira Dela Torre	₱270,000	
34	November; 26, 2023	100 Solo Parents #EverybodySingSolo #EverybodySingParent	PicSing a Broken Song	"Huwag Ka Nang Magbabalik" by Roselle Nava	9											118 secs.	"Nasa'yo Ako" by Gigi De Lana	"Can Find No Reason" by Louie Heredia	₱270,000	
34	November; 26, 2023	100 Solo Parents #EverybodySingSolo #EverybodySingParent	Sing-Tunog	"Torpe" by Barbie Almalbis	10											118 secs.	"Line to Heaven" by Introvoys	"Paano Bang Mangarap" by Basil Valdez	₱270,000	
34	November; 26, 2023	100 Solo Parents #EverybodySingSolo #EverybodySingParent	The ChooSing One	"Tabing Ilog" by Barbie's Cradle	7											118 secs.	"Kay Ganda Ng Ating Musika" by Hajji Alejandro	"Ikaw Ang Pinili ng Puso Ko" by Fumiya Sankai & Yamyam Gucong	₱270,000	
34	November; 26, 2023	100 Solo Parents #EverybodySingSolo #EverybodySingParent	ReverSing	"Hanggang" by Wency Cornejo	4											118 secs.	"Diamante" by Morissette	"Can We Just Stop and Talk A While" by Jose Mari Chan	₱270,000	
Guests: Beki Velo & Didong (episode 33), Barbie Almalbis (episode 34); Re-broadcast date: January 27–28, 2024

Week 18 (December 2–3, 2023)
Episode		Songbayanan	Preliminary Rounds														Jackpot round (Ultimate Everybody GuesSing)		Prize won	Ref.
No.	Airing date	Songbayanan	Game	Song	SONGpu											Timer	Songs		Prize won	Ref.
No.	Airing date	Songbayanan	Game	Song	Row	1	2	3	4	5	6	7	8	9	10	Timer	Songs		Prize won	Ref.
35	December; 2, 2023	100 Magbabalut #EverybodySingBalut #EverybodySingPenoy	Sing in the Blank	"Esem" by Yano	1											80 secs.	"Pare Ko" by Eraserheads	"Kung Maibabalik Ko Lang" by Regine Velasquez	₱180,000	
35	December; 2, 2023	100 Magbabalut #EverybodySingBalut #EverybodySingPenoy	A-B-Sing	"The One That You Love" by Air Supply	4											80 secs.	"Akin Ka Lang" by The Itchyworms	"Bakit Pa Ba" by Jay-R	₱180,000	
35	December; 2, 2023	100 Magbabalut #EverybodySingBalut #EverybodySingPenoy	Lights, Camera, Act-Sing	"Tayong Dalawa" by Rey Valera	7											80 secs.	"Mr. Kupido" by Rachel Alejandro	"Sinasamba Kita" by Rey Valera	₱180,000	
35	December; 2, 2023	100 Magbabalut #EverybodySingBalut #EverybodySingPenoy	LipSing	"Huwag na Huwag; Mong Sasabihin" by Kitchie Nadal	8											80 secs.	"Kapantay Ay Langit" by Pilita Corrales	"Hawak Kamay" by Yeng Constantino	₱180,000	
35	December; 2, 2023	100 Magbabalut #EverybodySingBalut #EverybodySingPenoy	Ayu-Sing Mo	"Magsimula Ka" by Leo Valdez	9											80 secs.	"Titibo-Tibo" by Moira Dela Torre	"Hanggang Wala Nang Bukas" by Ebe Dancel	₱180,000	
36	December; 3, 2023	100 Magbabalut #EverybodySingBalut #EverybodySingPenoy	TagaliSing	"Iingatan Ka" by Carol Banawa	6											78 secs.	"Ikaw ang Liwanag at Ligaya" by ABS-CBN Music All Star	"Lupa" by Rico J. Puno	₱180,000	
36	December; 3, 2023	100 Magbabalut #EverybodySingBalut #EverybodySingPenoy	PicSing a Broken Song	"Chambe" by Alex Gonzaga	5											78 secs.	"Nobela" by Join the Club	"Kapag Tumibok Ang Puso" by Donna Cruz	₱180,000	
36	December; 3, 2023	100 Magbabalut #EverybodySingBalut #EverybodySingPenoy	Sing-Tunog	"Doon Lang" by Nonoy Zuñiga	2											78 secs.	"Kapalaran" by Ric Manrique Jr.	"Natatawa Ako" by Gabriela	₱180,000	
36	December; 3, 2023	100 Magbabalut #EverybodySingBalut #EverybodySingPenoy	The ChooSing One	"Never Ever; Say Goodbye" by Nonoy Zuñiga	3											78 secs.	"Pusong Bato" by Aimee Torres	"Cool Ka Lang" by Prettier than Pink	₱180,000	
36	December; 3, 2023	100 Magbabalut #EverybodySingBalut #EverybodySingPenoy	ReverSing	"Ayoko Na Sana" by Ariel Rivera	10											78 secs.	"Leron Leron Sinta"	"Binibini" by The Rainmakers	₱180,000	
Guests: Beki Velo & Didong (episode 35), Nonoy Zuñiga (episode 36); Re-broadcast date: January 20–21, 2024

Week 19 (February 10–11, 2024)
Episode		Songbayanan	Preliminary Rounds														Jackpot round (Ultimate Everybody GuesSing)		Prize won	Ref.
No.	Airing date	Songbayanan	Game	Song	SONGpu											Timer	Songs		Prize won	Ref.
No.	Airing date	Songbayanan	Game	Song	Row	1	2	3	4	5	6	7	8	9	10	Timer	Songs		Prize won	Ref.
37	February; 10, 2024	100 Divisoria; Stall Sellers #EverybodySingDivisoria #EverybodySingSeller	Sing in the Blank	"Upside Down" by Two Minds Crack	3											62 secs.	"Panahon Na Naman" by Rivermaya	"Leaves" by Ben&Ben	₱2,040,000	
37	February; 10, 2024	100 Divisoria; Stall Sellers #EverybodySingDivisoria #EverybodySingSeller	A-B-Sing	"Kasalanan Ko Ba" by Toni Gonzaga	10											62 secs.	"Pagsamo" by Arthur Nery	"Huwag Ka Lang Mawawala" by Ogie Alcasid	₱2,040,000	
37	February; 10, 2024	100 Divisoria; Stall Sellers #EverybodySingDivisoria #EverybodySingSeller	Lights, Camera, Act-Sing	"Tagpuan" by Moira Dela Torre	5											62 secs.	"Pano" by Zack Tabudlo	"Nakapagtataka" by Rachel Alejandro	₱2,040,000	
37	February; 10, 2024	100 Divisoria; Stall Sellers #EverybodySingDivisoria #EverybodySingSeller	LipSing	"Magandang Dilag" by JM Bales (feat. KVN)	2											62 secs.	"Rock Baby Rock" by VST & Company	"Ligaya" by Eraserheads	₱2,040,000	
37	February; 10, 2024	100 Divisoria; Stall Sellers #EverybodySingDivisoria #EverybodySingSeller	Ayu-Sing Mo	"Buloy" by Parokya ni Edgar	7											62 secs.	"Hanggang Dito Na Lang" by Jaya	"Kung Ayaw Mo, Huwag Mo" by Rivermaya	₱2,040,000	
38	February; 11, 2024	100 Divisoria; Stall Sellers #EverybodySingDivisoria #EverybodySingSeller	TagaliSing	"Kaba" by Tootsie Guevarra	4											118 secs.	"Para Sa Akin" by Sitti	"Sana Sana" by Angeline Quinto	₱2,040,000	
38	February; 11, 2024	100 Divisoria; Stall Sellers #EverybodySingDivisoria #EverybodySingSeller	PicSing a Broken Song	"Toyang" by Eraserheads	1											118 secs.	"Bonggahan" by Sampaguita	"Catch Me I'm Falling" by Toni Gonzaga	₱2,040,000	
38	February; 11, 2024	100 Divisoria; Stall Sellers #EverybodySingDivisoria #EverybodySingSeller	Sing-Tunog	"Give Me a Chance" by Ric Segreto	6											118 secs.	"High School Life" by Sharon Cuneta	"Laklak" by Teeth	₱2,040,000	
38	February; 11, 2024	100 Divisoria; Stall Sellers #EverybodySingDivisoria #EverybodySingSeller	The ChooSing; One	"A Smile in Your Heart" by Jed Madela	9											118 secs.	"Kailan" by Smokey Mountain	"Paalam Na" by Rachel Alejandro	₱2,040,000	
38	February; 11, 2024	100 Divisoria; Stall Sellers #EverybodySingDivisoria #EverybodySingSeller	ReverSing	"Kunin Mo Na ang Lahat sa Akin" by Fourmula	8											118 secs.	"Kilometro" by Sarah Geronimo	"Kung Ako'y Iiwan Mo" by Basil Valdez	₱2,040,000	
Guests: Beki Velo & Petite (episode 37), Jed Madela (episode 38)

== Statistics ==
=== Scoring ===
This section includes the scoring of all groups throughout their respective games.

Legend

Perfect score (10)
Almost perfect score (9)
Middle score (5 to 8)
Low score (0 to 4)

Table showing the number of correct answers of games played by every Songbayanan
Songbayanan	A-B-Sing	Ayu-Sing Mo	EngliSing ang Lyrics	Lights, Camera, Act-Sing	LipSing	PicSing a Broken Song	Sing in the Blank	Sing-Tunog	ReverSing	TagaliSing	The ChooSing One	Total	Average (Note: The average is rounded off to the nearest number.)
Pulis	3	9	8	4	9	8	10	7	2	—	10	70	7
Sanitation Workers	6	4	—	5	9	4	6	2	7	5	8	56	6
Mag-Ama	7	10	—	4	6	8	1	4	3	9	10	62	6
Manila Fire Survivors	7	7	—	4	10	8	3	7	6	8	7	67	7
Engaged Couples	9	9	8	3	3	8	4	7	6	—	8	65	7
Sari-Sari Store Sellers	9	5	—	2	8	8	7	6	5	6	7	63	6
Tattoo & Body Piercing Artists	1	10	6	6	8	2	9	10	5	—	10	67	7
Nurses	6	6	—	7	6	8	5	9	4	6	9	66	7
Government Employees	0	9	—	6	6	8	10	9	6	7	10	71	7
Mangangalakal	6	6	—	3	8	6	8	4	8	6	10	65	7
Dancers	9	6	—	3	1	9	9	7	3	6	8	61	6
2023 College Graduates	7	3	6	2	6	7	2	7	4	—	10	54	5
Pawnshop & Money Remittance Tellers	7	8	—	5	9	4	9	7	1	9	10	69	7
Band Members	7	7	—	6	3	7	6	8	7	8	9	68	7
Taguig Tenement Community	7	7	—	8	6	4	6	7	7	7	9	68	7
Pharmacists & Botika Employees	7	9	—	6	3	4	3	8	2	9	10	61	6
Solo Parents	5	9	8	5	10	9	7	4	9	—	8	74	7
Magbabalut	8	7	—	6	7	3	4	6	6	10	8	65	7
Divisoria Stall Sellers	7	5	—	8	4	8	2	10	10	8	8	71	7
Average	6	7	7	5	6	6	6	7	5	7	9	65	7

Table of perfect score statistics
Game	No. as of latest episode	Groups
Ayu-Sing Mo	2	Mag-Ama; Tattoo & Body Piercing Artists
Lip-Sing	2	Manila Fire Survivors; Solo Parents
ReverSing	1	Divisoria Stall Sellers
Sing in the Blank	2	Pulis; Government Employees
Sing-Tunog	1	Divisoria Stall Sellers
The ChooSing One	8	Pulis; Mag-Ama; Tattoo & Body Piercing Artists; Government Employees; Mangangalakal; 2023 College Graduates; Pawnshop & Money Remittance Tellers; Pharmacists & Botika Employees

Table of almost perfect score statistics
Game	No. as of latest episode	Groups
A-B-Sing	3	Engaged Couples; Sari-Sari Store Sellers; Dancers
Ayu-Sing Mo	5	Pulis; Engaged Couples; Government Employees; Pharmacists & Botika Employees; Solo Parents
Lip-Sing	3	Pulis; Sanitation Workers; Pawnshop & Money Remittance Tellers
PicSing a Broken Song	2	Dancers; Solo Parents
ReverSing	1	Solo Parents
Sing in the Blank	3	Tattoo & Body Piercing Artists; Dancers; Pawnshop & Money Remittance Tellers
Sing-Tunog	2	Nurses; Government Employees
TagaliSing	3	Mag-Ama; Pawnshop & Money Remittance Tellers; Pharmacists & Botika Employees
The ChooSing One	3	Nurses; Band Members; Taguig Tenement Community

Table of half score statistics
Game	No. as of latest episode	Groups
A-B-Sing	1	Solo Parents
Ayu-Sing Mo	1	Divisoria Stall Sellers
Lights, Camera, Act-Sing	3	Sanitation Workers; Pawnshop & Money Remittance Tellers; Solo Parents
ReverSing	2	Sari-Sari Store Sellers; Tattoo & Body Piercing Artists
Sing in the Blank	1	Nurses
TagaliSing	1	Sanitation Workers

Table of low score statistics
Game	No. as of latest episode	Groups
A-B-Sing	3	Pulis; Tattoo & Body Piercing Artists; Government Employees
Ayu-Sing Mo	2	Sanitation Workers; 100 2023 College Graduates
Lights, Camera, Act-Sing	8	Pulis; Mag-Ama; Manila Fire Survivors; Engaged Couples; Sari-Sari Store Sellers; Mangangalakal; Dancers; 2023 College Graduates
Lip-Sing	5	Engaged Couples; Dancers; Divisoria Stall Sellers; Band Members; Pharmacists & Botika Employees
PicSing a Broken Song	6	Sanitation Workers; Tattoo & Body Piercing Artists; Pawnshop & Money Remittance Tellers; Pharmacists & Botika Employees; Taguig Tenement Community; Magbabalut
ReverSing	7	Pulis; Mag-Ama; Nurses; Dancers; 2023 College Graduates; Pawnshop & Money Remittance Tellers; Pharmacists & Botika Employees
Sing in the Blank	7	Mag-Ama; Manila Fire Survivors; Engaged Couples; Pharmacists & Botika Employees; 2023 College Graduates; Magbabalut; Divisoria Stall Sellers
Sing-Tunog	4	Sanitation Workers; Mag-Ama; Mangangalakal; Solo Parents

=== Time Collection & Usage ===
This section includes the most and least seconds banked by each group, and the fastest time for a group to win the jackpot prize. This section is divided into three parts: the most banked, least banked, and other time collection statistics.

Table of most banked statistics
Statistic	No. of seconds as of latest episode	Group(s)
Banked by group on Round 1	92 seconds	Pawnshop & Money Remittance Tellers
Banked by group to Round 2	41 seconds	Mag-Ama
Banked by group on Round 2	102 seconds	Pulis
Combined seconds by a group on the last 5 games (excluding banked time from Round 1)	118 seconds	Pawnshop & Money Remittance Tellers
Combined seconds by a group on the last 5 games (including banked time from Round 1)	108 seconds	Solo Parents
Combined seconds by a group on all two rounds (including banked time from Round 1)	208 seconds	Solo Parents

Table of least banked statistics
Statistic	No. of seconds as of latest episode	Group	Remarks
Time collected by a group on Round 1	46 seconds	2023 College Graduates	
Time banked by a group to Round 2	2 seconds	Mangangalakal	
Time collected by a group on the last 5 games	54 seconds	Sanitation Workers	
Combined seconds by a group on the last 5 games (excluding banked time from Round 1)	144 seconds	Sanitation Workers	80 + 54 + 10 secs.
Combined seconds by a group on the last 5 games (including banked time from Round 1)	170 seconds	Manila Fire Survivors	78 + 92 secs.
Combined seconds by a group on all two rounds (including banked time from Round 1)	144 seconds	2023 College Graduates	46 + 12 + 76 + 10 secs.

Table of miscellaneous time collection statistics
Statistic	No. of seconds as of latest episode	Group(s)	Remarks
Most combined seconds banked by a group without Golden Time Bonus	164 seconds	Taguig Tenement Community	82 + 82 secs.
Least combined seconds banked by a group without Golden Time Bonus	146 seconds	Sari-Sari Store Sellers	72 + 74 secs.
Fastest time for a group to win the entirety of the jackpot round	96 seconds	Mag-Ama	

=== Ultimate Everybody, GuesSing? ===
This section includes the final outcomes of every group, either good or bad, in the jackpot round.

Table of Ultimate Everybody, GuesSing statistics
Statistic	No. as of latest episode	Group(s)
Highest number of correct streaks	8	Mag-Ama
Highest number of target number of songs required by a group to guess in the jackpot round	17 out of 20	Pulis
Reached target of 10 titles	4	Engaged Couples; Manila Fire Survivors; Mangangalakal; Solo Parents
Reached target of less than 10 titles	4	Mag-Ama; Sanitation Workers; 2023 College Graduates; Pharmacists and Botika Employees
Reached target of 10 titles, guessed all 20 titles	2	Manila Fire Survivors; Mangangalakal
Reached target of 10 titles, failed to guess all 20 titles	2	Engaged Couples; Solo Parents
Reached target of less than 10 songs, guessed all 20 titles	3	Mag-Ama; Pharmacists and Botika Employees; Divisoria Stall Sellers
Failed to reach target of 10 titles in Round 1	10	Pulis; Sari-Sari Store Sellers; Tattoo & Body Piercing Artists; Dancers; Pawnshop & Money Remittance Tellers; Band Members; Taguig Tenement Community; Pharmacists and Botika Employees, Magbabalut; Divisoria Stall Sellers
Failed to reach target of 10 titles in Round 1 and failed to guess all 20 titles	3	Sanitation Workers; Nurses; Government Employees
Failed to reach target of less than 10 titles in Round 1 and failed to guess all 20 titles	2	Nurses; Government Employees
Failed to claim Golden Time Bonus	4	Sari-Sari Store Sellers; Pawnshop & Money Remittance Tellers; Taguig Tenement Community; Magbabalut

=== Overall performance statistics ===
This section contains the overall performance statistics of each and every Songbayanan on their respective games on the season.

Ranking of groups with number of perfect scores
No. of games with perfect score	No. as of latest episode	Group(s)
3	1	Tattoo & Body Piercing Artists
2	4	Pulis; Mag-Ama; Government Employees; Divisoria Stall Sellers
1	7	Manila Fire Survivors; Mangangalakal; 2023 College Graduates; Pawnshop & Money Remittance Tellers; Pharmacists & Botika Employees; Solo Parents; Magbabalut
0	7	Sanitation Workers; Engaged Couples; Sari-Sari Store Sellers; Nurses; Dancers; Band Members; Taguig Tenement Community

== See also ==
- Everybody, Sing!
  - Everybody, Sing! season 1
  - Everybody, Sing! season 2
  - Everybody, Sing! season 3
- List of Everybody, Sing! season 1 episodes
- List of Everybody, Sing! season 2 episodes
