= List of Everybody, Sing! season 1 episodes =

- More about the series

Episodes overview
- Total episode(s): 38 episodes
- Aired episode(s): 30 episodes
- Special episode(s): 6 episodes
- Rerun(s): 2 episodes
- Last updated on August 18, 2024

The first season of the musical game show Everybody, Sing! ran from June 5 to October 10, 2021, and had aired a total of 38 episodes, consisting of 30 aired episodes, six special episodes, and two episode re-runs that were aired due to the implementation of enhanced community quarantine in Metro Manila.

The first season aired the six special episodes which featured the game show's original format which was taped before the COVID-19 pandemic and the ABS-CBN franchise shutdown known as the 100 Songbayanan Special as its season finale one week after the airing of the 25 Perya Performers episode and ran for three weeks with six episodes on September 25 until October 10, 2021.

This season, thirty-three groups played, with thirty in the modified format and three in the original format (100 Songbayanan Special). During the modified format, six groups won the jackpot prize of ₱500,000, the most in a season in the entire series. During the original format, one group won the jackpot prize of ₱2,000,000.

== Episodes overview ==
Legend

The Songbayanan received the highest possible amount as their winning prize in the jackpot round (₱500,000.)
The Songbayanan did not receive the highest possible amount as their winning prize in the jackpot round.
The Songbayanan did not receive any amount as their winning prize in the jackpot round.
No data.

List of Everybody, Sing! season 1 episodes
Episode		Songbayanan	Prize won	Ref.
No.	Airing date	Songbayanan	Prize won	Ref.
Season 1
1	June 5, 2021	25 Community Pantry Volunteers	₱500,000	
2	June 6, 2021	25 Food and Beverage Service Crew	₱40,000	
3	June 12, 2021	25 Janitors and Cleaners	₱30,000 (Note: Excluding additional cash prize given by Vice Ganda.)	
4	June 13, 2021	25 Delivery Riders	₱20,000	
5	June 19, 2021	25 Grocery Frontliners (Note: This episode was supposed to air on June 13, 2021 but moved to June 19, 2021.)	₱30,000	
6	June 20, 2021	25 Fitness Instructors	₱30,000	
7	June 26, 2021	25 Massage Therapists	₱500,000	
8	June 27, 2021	25 Security Guards	₱20,000	
9	July 3, 2021	25 PGH Employees and Volunteers	₱40,000	
10	July 4, 2021	25 Contact Tracers	₱20,000	
11	July 10, 2021	25 Live Online Sellers	₱40,000	
12	July 11, 2021	25 Kasambahay (Housekeepers)	₱10,000	
13	July 17, 2021	25 Comedy Bar Performers	₱45,000	
14	July 18, 2021	25 Teachers	₱500,000	
15	July 24, 2021	25 Street Food Vendors	₱35,000	
16	July 25, 2021	25 Extras and Talents (Note: 25 Extras and Talents was announced to be featured in the show on June 27, 2021, and was supposed to air on July 3, 2021.)	₱30,000	
17	July 31, 2021	25 Bourne to Hike Mountaineers	₱25,000	
18	August 1, 2021	25 Bus, Jeepney, and Tricycle Drivers	₱500,000	
19	August 7, 2021	25 Seafarers	₱35,000	
20	August 8, 2021	25 Labandero at Labandera (Laundry Workers)	₱35,000	
21	August 21, 2021	25 Barangay Tanod (Village Watchmen)	₱25,000	
22	August 22, 2021	25 Call Center Agents	₱500,000	
23	August 28, 2021	25 Flight Attendants	₱70,000	
24	August 29, 2021	25 Factory Workers	₱500,000	
25	September 4, 2021	25 Tourism Industry Workers	₱15,000	
26	September 5, 2021	25 Stage Performers	₱40,000	
27	September 11, 2021	25 Pageant Winners	₱25,000	
28	September 12, 2021	25 Social Media Content Creators	₱35,000	
29	September 18, 2021	25 National Athletes	₱10,000	
30	September 19, 2021	25 Perya Performers (Fair Performers)	₱35,000	

== Season 1 ==
On August 14 and 15, 2021, the program aired replays due to the implementation of enhanced community quarantine in Metro Manila.

Legend

- – The SingKo contestant successfully guessed two lines of the song correctly / The SONGpu contestant successfully guessed the line of the song correctly.
- – The SingKo contestant only guessed one line of the song correctly.
- – The SingKo / SONGpu contestant failed to give any correct line of the song.
- – During the Jackpot round ("Everybody GuesSing"), the Songbayanan guessed the song correctly.
- – During the Jackpot round ("Everybody GuesSing"), the Songbayanan did not guess the song correctly.

Week 1 (June 5–6, 2021)
Episode		Songbayanan	Preliminary rounds								Jackpot round (Everybody GuesSing)			Prize won	Ref.
Episode		Songbayanan	Game	Song	SingKo						Timer	Songs		Prize won	Ref.
No.	Airing date	Songbayanan	Game	Song	Row	1	2	3	4	5	Timer	Songs		Prize won	Ref.
1	June 5, 2021	25 Community Pantry Volunteers #EverybodySing	Sing in the Blank	"Ligaya" by Eraserheads	1						92 secs.	"Mr. DJ" by Sharon Cuneta	"London Bridge Is Falling Down"	₱500,000	
1	June 5, 2021	25 Community Pantry Volunteers #EverybodySing	PicSing a Broken Song	"Your Love" by Alamid	4						92 secs.	"Mula Sa Puso" by Jude Michael	"Kahit Habang Buhay" by Smokey Mountain	₱500,000	
1	June 5, 2021	25 Community Pantry Volunteers #EverybodySing	The ChooSing One	"Bad Romance" by Lady Gaga	5						92 secs.	"May Bukas Pa" by Rico J. Puno	"Kung Kailangan Mo Ako" by Rey Valera	₱500,000	
1	June 5, 2021	25 Community Pantry Volunteers #EverybodySing	EngliSing ang Lyrics	"Forevermore" by Juris	3						92 secs.	"Bongga Ka Day" by Hotdog	"Mr. Right" by Kim Chiu	₱500,000	
1	June 5, 2021	25 Community Pantry Volunteers #EverybodySing	ReverSing	"Tuloy Pa Rin" by Neocolours	2						92 secs.	"Sinta" by Aegis	"Pamela" by Vhong Navarro	₱500,000	
2	June 6, 2021	25 Food and Beverage Service Crew #EverybodySingPH	Sing in the Blank	"Laki sa Layaw" by Mike Hanopol	4						76 secs.	"Don Romantiko" by Vhong Navarro	"Titser's Enemy No. 1" by Juan de la Cruz Band	₱40,000	
2	June 6, 2021	25 Food and Beverage Service Crew #EverybodySingPH	EngliSing ang Lyrics	"Crazy For You" by Madonna	2						76 secs.	"The Light" by BGYO	"Nasa Iyo Na Ang Lahat" by Daniel Padilla	₱40,000	
2	June 6, 2021	25 Food and Beverage Service Crew #EverybodySingPH	PicSing a Broken Song	"Da Coconut Nut" by Bini	5						76 secs.	"Himala" by Rivermaya	"Usahay" by Pilita Corrales	₱40,000	
2	June 6, 2021	25 Food and Beverage Service Crew #EverybodySingPH	The ChooSing One	"Bakit Ba Ikaw" by Michael Pangilinan	3						76 secs.	"Kabataan Para sa Kinabukasan" by Francis Magalona	"Karakaraka" by Vice Ganda	₱40,000	
2	June 6, 2021	25 Food and Beverage Service Crew #EverybodySingPH	ReverSing	"'Wag Na 'Wag Mong Sasabihin" by Kitchie Nadal	1						76 secs.	"Panalangin" by APO Hiking Society	"Spoliarium" by Eraserheads	₱40,000	

Week 2 (June 12–13, 2021)
Episode		Songbayanan	Preliminary rounds								Jackpot round (Everybody GuesSing)			Prize won	Ref.
Episode		Songbayanan	Game	Song	SingKo						Timer	Songs		Prize won	Ref.
No.	Airing date	Songbayanan	Game	Song	Row	1	2	3	4	5	Timer	Songs		Prize won	Ref.
3	June 12, 2021	25 Janitors and Cleaners #EverybodySingLinis	Sing in the Blank	"Dying Inside To Hold You" by Timmy Thomas	2						80 secs.	"Porque" by Maldita	"Legs" by Hagibis	₱30,000	
3	June 12, 2021	25 Janitors and Cleaners #EverybodySingLinis	PicSing a Broken Song	"This Guy Is In Love With You Pare" by Parokya ni Edgar	1						80 secs.	"Magsayawan" by VST & Co.	"Hanggang sa Dulo ng Walang Hanggan" by Basil Valdez	₱30,000	
3	June 12, 2021	25 Janitors and Cleaners #EverybodySingLinis	EngliSing ang Lyrics	"Shout For Joy" by Gary Valenciano	4						80 secs.	"Di Ba't Ikaw" by Jessa Zaragoza	"Each Day With You" by Martin Nievera	₱30,000	
3	June 12, 2021	25 Janitors and Cleaners #EverybodySingLinis	The ChooSing One	"Mahal Ko O Mahal Ako" by KZ Tandingan	3						80 secs.	"Rock-a-bye Baby"	"You're Makin' Me Kilig" by Shawntel	₱30,000	
3	June 12, 2021	25 Janitors and Cleaners #EverybodySingLinis	ReverSing	"Luha" by Aegis	5						80 secs.	"So It's You" by Raymond Lauchengco	"Mangarap Ka" by AfterImage	₱30,000	
4	June 13, 2021	25 Delivery Riders #EverybodySingRider	Sing in the Blank	"Babaero" by Randy Santiago	3						64 secs.	"Araw-araw, Gabi-gabi" by Didith Reyes	"Nang Dahil Sa Pag-Ibig" by Tootsie Guevarra	₱20,000	
4	June 13, 2021	25 Delivery Riders #EverybodySingRider	EngliSing ang Lyrics	"Say You'll Never Go" by Neocolours	1						64 secs.	"Kaliwete" by Eraserheads	"Photograph" by Ariel Rivera	₱20,000	
4	June 13, 2021	25 Delivery Riders #EverybodySingRider	The ChooSing One	"Kapag Tumibok Ang Puso" by Donna Cruz	4						64 secs.	"Lipad ng Pangarap" by Dessa	"You'll Always Be My Number One" by Vernie Varga	₱20,000	
4	June 13, 2021	25 Delivery Riders #EverybodySingRider	PicSing a Broken Song	"Borderline" by Madonna	5						64 secs.	"Hiling" by Jay-R Siaboc	"Malaya" by Moira Dela Torre	₱20,000	
4	June 13, 2021	25 Delivery Riders #EverybodySingRider	ReverSing	"Kaba" by Tootsie Guevarra	2						64 secs.	"Can Find No Reason" by Louie Heredia	"Kung Ako Na Lang Sana" by Bituin Escalante	₱20,000	

Week 3 (June 19–20, 2021)
Episode		Songbayanan	Preliminary rounds								Jackpot round (Everybody GuesSing)			Prize won	Ref.
Episode		Songbayanan	Game	Song	SingKo						Timer	Songs		Prize won	Ref.
No.	Airing date	Songbayanan	Game	Song	Row	1	2	3	4	5	Timer	Songs		Prize won	Ref.
5	June 19, 2021	25 Grocery Frontliners #EverybodySingGrocery	Sing in the Blank	"Dadalhin" by Regine Velasquez-Alcasid	4						90 secs.	"I-Swing Mo Ako" by Sharon Cuneta	"Oh Babe" by Singsing	₱30,000	
5	June 19, 2021	25 Grocery Frontliners #EverybodySingGrocery	PicSing a Broken Song	"Can We Just Stop And Talk a While" by Jose Mari Chan	1						90 secs.	"Unli" by BoybandPH	"Mag-Exercise Tayo" by Yoyoy Villame	₱30,000	
5	June 19, 2021	25 Grocery Frontliners #EverybodySingGrocery	EngliSing ang Lyrics	"I Wanna Dance With Somebody (Who Loves Me)" by Whitney Houston	3						90 secs.	"You Are The One" by Serenity	"Jeepney Love Story" by Yeng Constantino	₱30,000	
5	June 19, 2021	25 Grocery Frontliners #EverybodySingGrocery	The ChooSing One	"Nanghihinayang" by Jeremiah	5						90 secs.	"Ikaw ang Miss Universe ng Buhay Ko" by Hotdog	"Nosi Balasi" by Sampaguita	₱30,000	
5	June 19, 2021	25 Grocery Frontliners #EverybodySingGrocery	ReverSing	"Kailan" by Smokey Mountain	2						90 secs.	"Stars" by Callalily	"Tagpuan" by Moira Dela Torre	₱30,000	
6	June 20, 2021	25 Fitness Instructors #EverybodySingLakas	Sing in the Blank	"Taralets" by Imago	2						76 secs.	"So It's You" by Raymond Lauchengco	"Ewan" by APO Hiking Society	₱30,000	
6	June 20, 2021	25 Fitness Instructors #EverybodySingLakas	EngliSing ang Lyrics	"Stay" by Cueshé	1						76 secs.	"Sumayaw Ka" by Gloc-9	"If" by Nelson Del Castillo	₱30,000	
6	June 20, 2021	25 Fitness Instructors #EverybodySingLakas	PicSing a Broken Song	"Kaleidoscope World" by Francis Magalona	5						76 secs.	"Mundo" by IV of Spades	"Akin Ka Na Lang" by Morissette	₱30,000	
6	June 20, 2021	25 Fitness Instructors #EverybodySingLakas	The ChooSing One	"I Don't Want to Miss a Thing" by Regine Velasquez-Alcasid	3						76 secs.	"Amazing Grace"	"Sa Aking Puso" by Ariel Rivera	₱30,000	
6	June 20, 2021	25 Fitness Instructors #EverybodySingLakas	ReverSing	"No Touch" by Juan de la Cruz Band	4						76 secs.	"Cool Off" by Yeng Constantino	"Stay" by Carol Banawa	₱30,000	

Week 4 (June 26–27, 2021)
Episode		Songbayanan	Preliminary rounds								Jackpot round (Everybody GuesSing)			Prize won	Ref.
Episode		Songbayanan	Game	Song	SingKo						Timer	Songs		Prize won	Ref.
No.	Airing date	Songbayanan	Game	Song	Row	1	2	3	4	5	Timer	Songs		Prize won	Ref.
7	June 26, 2021	25 Massage Therapists #EverybodySingMassage	Sing in the Blank	"Ang Huling El Bimbó" by Eraserheads	4						86 secs.	"Chinito Problems" by Enchong Dee	"Tameme" by Jolina Magdangal	₱500,000	
7	June 26, 2021	25 Massage Therapists #EverybodySingMassage	The ChooSing One	"Sana Kahit Minsan" by Ariel Rivera	5						86 secs.	"Kastilyong Buhangin" by Basil Valdez	"In or Out" by Sandara Park	₱500,000	
7	June 26, 2021	25 Massage Therapists #EverybodySingMassage	PicSing a Broken Song	"Uptown Girl" by Billy Joel	1						86 secs.	"From The Start" by Rachelle Ann Go	"Mahirap Magmahal ng Syota ng Iba" by APO Hiking Society	₱500,000	
7	June 26, 2021	25 Massage Therapists #EverybodySingMassage	TagaliSing	"Urong Sulong" by Regine Velasquez-Alcasid	3						86 secs.	"Iingatan Ka" by Carol Banawa	"Hindi Tayo Pwede" by The Juans	₱500,000	
7	June 26, 2021	25 Massage Therapists #EverybodySingMassage	ReverSing	"Salamat" by Yeng Constantino	2						86 secs.	"Nanggigigil" by Hagibis	"O Lumapit Ka" by Hotdog	₱500,000	
8	June 27, 2021	25 Security Guards #EverybodySingSekyu	Sing in the Blank	"Sayawan" by Sampaguita	1						58 secs.	"Kakaibabe" by Donnalyn Bartolome	"Prom" by Ebe Dancel of Sugarfree and Yeng Constantino	₱20,000	
8	June 27, 2021	25 Security Guards #EverybodySingSekyu	The ChooSing One	"Kung 'Di Rin Lang Ikaw" by December Avenue	3						58 secs.	"Penge Naman Ako Niyan" by Itchyworms	"Sana'y Maghintay ng Walang Hanggan" by Sharon Cuneta	₱20,000	
8	June 27, 2021	25 Security Guards #EverybodySingSekyu	EngliSing ang Lyrics	"We Built This City" by Starship	5						58 secs.	"Bulag, Pipi at Bingi" by Freddie Aguilar	"Pare, Mahal Mo Raw Ako" by Michael Pangilinan	₱20,000	
8	June 27, 2021	25 Security Guards #EverybodySingSekyu	PicSing a Broken Song	"Ale" by the Bloomfields	2						58 secs.	"Hatid Sundo" by Gimme 5	"Bagong Simula" by Jem Macatuno	₱20,000	
8	June 27, 2021	25 Security Guards #EverybodySingSekyu	ReverSing	"Nobela" by Join the Club	4						58 secs.	"Totoy Bibo" by Vhong Navarro	"Gaano Kadalas Ang Minsan" by Basil Valdez	₱20,000	

Week 5 (July 3–4, 2021)
Episode		Songbayanan	Preliminary rounds								Jackpot round (Everybody GuesSing)			Prize won	Ref.
Episode		Songbayanan	Game	Song	SingKo						Timer	Songs		Prize won	Ref.
No.	Airing date	Songbayanan	Game	Song	Row	1	2	3	4	5	Timer	Songs		Prize won	Ref.
9	July 3, 2021	25 PGH Employees and Volunteers #EverybodySingPGH	Sing in the Blank	"All Out of Love" by Air Supply	2						90 secs.	"Baa Baa Black Sheep"	"Paano Kita Mapasasalamatan?" by Juris	₱40,000	
9	July 3, 2021	25 PGH Employees and Volunteers #EverybodySingPGH	TagaliSing	"Sa Iyo" by Sarah Geronimo	5						90 secs.	"May Minamahal" by Rachel Alejandro	"Maghihintay Ako" by Jona	₱40,000	
9	July 3, 2021	25 PGH Employees and Volunteers #EverybodySingPGH	PicSing a Broken Song	"I Can" by Donna Cruz	1						90 secs.	"Simple Lang" by Ariel Rivera	"Mabagal" by Daniel Padilla and Moira Dela Torre	₱40,000	
9	July 3, 2021	25 PGH Employees and Volunteers #EverybodySingPGH	The ChooSing One	"Elesi" by Rivermaya	4						90 secs.	"Doon Lang" by Nonoy Zuñiga	"Can This Be Love" by Smokey Mountain	₱40,000	
9	July 3, 2021	25 PGH Employees and Volunteers #EverybodySingPGH	ReverSing	"Pinoy Ako" by Orange and Lemons	3						90 secs.	"Babae" by Hagibis	"Beh, Buti Nga" by Hotdog	₱40,000	
10	July 4, 2021	25 Contact Tracers #EverybodySingTracers	Sing in the Blank	"Kahit Maputi Na Ang Buhok Ko" by Rey Valera	3						62 secs.	"Ikaw" by Regine Velasquez	"For He's a Jolly Good Fellow"	₱20,000	
10	July 4, 2021	25 Contact Tracers #EverybodySingTracers	TagaliSing	"Akin Ka Na Lang" by Itchyworms	2						62 secs.	"Girl Be Mine" by Francis Magalona	"Miss Flawless" by Angelica Jones	₱20,000	
10	July 4, 2021	25 Contact Tracers #EverybodySingTracers	The ChooSing One	"Let's Get Loud" by Jennifer Lopez	4						62 secs.	"Dito Ba" by Kuh Ledesma	"Princesa" by Teeth	₱20,000	
10	July 4, 2021	25 Contact Tracers #EverybodySingTracers	PicSing a Broken Song	"Maybe The Night" by Ben&Ben	1						62 secs.	"Tag-araw" by AfterImage	"Balisong" by Rivermaya	₱20,000	
10	July 4, 2021	25 Contact Tracers #EverybodySingTracers	ReverSing	"Patuloy Ang Pangarap" by Angeline Quinto	5						62 secs.	"Kailan Kaya" by Sheryn Regis	"Kapantay Ay Langit" by Pilita Corrales	₱20,000	

Week 6 (July 10–11, 2021)
Episode		Songbayanan	Preliminary rounds								Jackpot round (Everybody GuesSing)			Prize won	Ref.
Episode		Songbayanan	Game	Song	SingKo						Timer	Songs		Prize won	Ref.
No.	Airing date	Songbayanan	Game	Song	Row	1	2	3	4	5	Timer	Songs		Prize won	Ref.
11	July 10, 2021	25 Live Online Sellers #EverybodySingOnline	Sing in the Blank	"Otso-Otso" by Bayani Agbayani	3						86 secs.	"We Belong" by Toni Gonzaga	"Sasamahan Kita" by Loisa Andalio	₱40,000	
11	July 10, 2021	25 Live Online Sellers #EverybodySingOnline	EngliSing ang Lyrics	"So Slow" by Freestyle	5						86 secs.	"Mahal Kita Pero" by Janella Salvador	"No Erase" by James Reid and Nadine Lustre	₱40,000	
11	July 10, 2021	25 Live Online Sellers #EverybodySingOnline	PicSing a Broken Song	"Nais Ko" by Basil Valdez	2						86 secs.	"Oha, Kaya Mo Ba 'To?" by Enrique Gil	"Si Felimon" by Yoyoy Villame	₱40,000	
11	July 10, 2021	25 Live Online Sellers #EverybodySingOnline	The ChooSing One	"Bang Bang" by Jessie J, Ariana Grande and Nicki Minaj	1						86 secs.	"Kahit Na" by Zsa Zsa Padilla	"Ngayon At Kailanman" by Basil Valdez	₱40,000	
11	July 10, 2021	25 Live Online Sellers #EverybodySingOnline	ReverSing	"Hanggang Kailan" by Orange and Lemons	4						86 secs.	"Dahil Tanging Ikaw" by Jaya	"Pagtingin" by Ben&Ben	₱40,000	
12	July 11, 2021	25 Kasambahay #EverybodySingKasambahay	Sing in the Blank	"Halik" by Aegis	2						54 secs.	"Kembot" by Amber Davis	"Bye Bye Na" by Rico Blanco	₱10,000	
12	July 11, 2021	25 Kasambahay #EverybodySingKasambahay	PicSing a Broken Song	"Simpleng Tao" by Gloc-9	5						54 secs.	"My Love Will See You Through" by Marco Sison	"Filipina Girl" by Billy Crawford featuring Marcus Davis and James Reid	₱10,000	
12	July 11, 2021	25 Kasambahay #EverybodySingKasambahay	TagaliSing	"Ikot-Ikot" by Sarah Geronimo	1						54 secs.	"Annie Batungbakal" by Hotdog	"Mobe" by Enrique Gil	₱10,000	
12	July 11, 2021	25 Kasambahay #EverybodySingKasambahay	The ChooSing One	"It's All Coming Back to Me Now" by Céline Dion	3						54 secs.	"Paalam Na" by Rachel Alejandro	"Bawat Daan" by Ebe Dancel	₱10,000	
12	July 11, 2021	25 Kasambahay #EverybodySingKasambahay	ReverSing	"Awit Ng Kabataan" by Rivermaya	4						54 secs.	"Pangarap Lang" by Yeng Constantino	"Kahit Kailan" by South Border	₱10,000	

Week 7 (July 17–18, 2021)
Episode		Songbayanan	Preliminary rounds								Jackpot round (Everybody GuesSing)			Prize won	Ref.
Episode		Songbayanan	Game	Song	SingKo						Timer	Songs		Prize won	Ref.
No.	Airing date	Songbayanan	Game	Song	Row	1	2	3	4	5	Timer	Songs		Prize won	Ref.
13	July 17, 2021	25 Comedy Bar Performers #EverybodySingComedy	Sing in the Blank	"Wala Na Bang Pag-ibig" by Jaya	2						102 secs.	"Say That You Love Me" by Martin Nievera	"Laguna" by Sampaguita	₱45,000	
13	July 17, 2021	25 Comedy Bar Performers #EverybodySingComedy	TagaliSing	"Liwanag Sa Dilim"; Rivermaya	5						102 secs.	"Pangarap Ka" by Geneva Cruz	"Sana ay Ikaw Na Nga" by Basil Valdez	₱45,000	
13	July 17, 2021	25 Comedy Bar Performers #EverybodySingComedy	The ChooSing One	"Respect" by Aretha Franklin	4						102 secs.	"Better World" by Smokey Mountain	"Gusto Na Kitang Makita" by SessiOnroad	₱45,000	
13	July 17, 2021	25 Comedy Bar Performers #EverybodySingComedy	PicSing a Broken Song	"Next in Line" by AfterImage	1						102 secs.	"Umiiyak Ang Puso" by Bugoy Drillon	"Kulang Ako Kung Wala Ka" by Erik Santos	₱45,000	
13	July 17, 2021	25 Comedy Bar Performers #EverybodySingComedy	ReverSing	"Tuwing Umuulan at Kapiling Ka" by Regine Velasquez	3						102 secs.	"Paano Ba ang Magmahal" by Piolo Pascual With Sarah Geronimo	"Gisingin ang Puso" by Liezel Garcia	₱45,000	
14	July 18, 2021	25 Teachers #EverybodySingTeachers	Sing in the Blank	"Di Bale Na Lang" by Gary Valenciano	2						78 secs.	"The Alphabet Song" or "Twinkle Twinkle Little Star"	"Makapiling Ka Sana"; Dingdong Avanzado	₱500,000	
14	July 18, 2021	25 Teachers #EverybodySingTeachers	PicSing a Broken Song	"Till My Heartaches End" by Ella May Saison	5						78 secs.	"Muli" by Rodel Naval	"Macho Gwapito" by Rico J. Puno	₱500,000	
14	July 18, 2021	25 Teachers #EverybodySingTeachers	TagaliSing	"Inuman Na" by Parokya Ni Edgar	1						78 secs.	"How Could You Say You Love Me" by Sarah Geronimo	"Hanggang" by Wency Cornejo	₱500,000	
14	July 18, 2021	25 Teachers #EverybodySingTeachers	The ChooSing One	"Finally" by CeCe Peniston	4						78 secs.	"Ye Ye Vonnel" by April Boy Regino	"Boompanes" by Vice Ganda	₱500,000	
14	July 18, 2021	25 Teachers #EverybodySingTeachers	ReverSing	"Pangarap Na Bituin" by Sharon Cuneta	3						78 secs.	"Awitin Mo At Isasayaw Ko" by VST & Co.	"Crazy Love" by Kim Chiu	₱500,000	

Week 8 (July 24–25, 2021)
Episode		Songbayanan	Preliminary rounds								Jackpot round (Everybody GuesSing)			Prize won	Ref.
Episode		Songbayanan	Game	Song	SingKo						Timer	Songs		Prize won	Ref.
No.	Airing date	Songbayanan	Game	Song	Row	1	2	3	4	5	Timer	Songs		Prize won	Ref.
15	July 24, 2021	25 Street Food Vendors #EverybodySingStreet	Sing in the Blank	"Ika'y Mahal Pa Rin" by Jovit Baldivino	1						60 secs.	"Happy Birthday"	"Matud Nila" by Pilita Corrales	₱35,000	
15	July 24, 2021	25 Street Food Vendors #EverybodySingStreet	PicSing a Broken Song	"Cool Ka Lang" by Prettier Than Pink	5						60 secs.	"Natataranta" by James Reid	"Pangarap" by Maymay Entrata	₱35,000	
15	July 24, 2021	25 Street Food Vendors #EverybodySingStreet	EngliSing ang Lyrics	"When I Met You" by Apo Hiking Society	3						60 secs.	"Anong Nangyari Sa Ating Dalawa" by Ice Seguerra	"Manila" by Hotdog	₱35,000	
15	July 24, 2021	25 Street Food Vendors #EverybodySingStreet	The ChooSing One	"Sometimes" by Britney Spears	2						60 secs.	"Manok Ni San Pedro" by Max Surban	"Dahil Mahal Na Mahal Kita" by Roselle Nava	₱35,000	
15	July 24, 2021	25 Street Food Vendors #EverybodySingStreet	LipSing	"Trip" by 6 Cyclemind	4						60 secs.	"Hindi Kita Malilimutan" by Basil Valdez	"Beer" by Itchyworms	₱35,000	
16	July 25, 2021	25 Extras and Talents #EverybodySingTalent	Sing in the Blank	"Superhero" by Rocksteddy	5						58 secs.	"Ikaw Lamang" by Zsa Zsa Padilla	"Simpleng Tao" by Gloc 9	₱30,000	—
16	July 25, 2021	25 Extras and Talents #EverybodySingTalent	EngliSing ang Lyrics	"Hurting Inside" by FOJ	3						58 secs.	"Hulog ng Langit" by Donna Cruz	"Tulak ng Bibig, Kabig ng Dibdib" by Lilet	₱30,000	—
16	July 25, 2021	25 Extras and Talents #EverybodySingTalent	PicSing a Broken Song	"She Will Be Loved" by Maroon 5	2						58 secs.	"Haypa" by MMJ	"Baliw" by Edward Barber and Maymay Entrata	₱30,000	—
16	July 25, 2021	25 Extras and Talents #EverybodySingTalent	The ChooSing One	"Kilometro" by Sarah Geronimo	1						58 secs.	"Oh My Darling Clementine"	"Ikaw ang Aking Mahal" by VST & Co.	₱30,000	—
16	July 25, 2021	25 Extras and Talents #EverybodySingTalent	ReverSing	"Tag-ulan" by AfterImage	4						58 secs.	"Ang Pag-Ibig Kong Ito" by Moonstar88	"Migraine" by Moonstar88	₱30,000	—

Week 9 (July 31-August 1, 2021)
Episode		Songbayanan	Preliminary rounds								Jackpot round (Everybody GuesSing)			Prize won	Ref.
Episode		Songbayanan	Game	Song	SingKo						Timer	Songs		Prize won	Ref.
No.	Airing date	Songbayanan	Game	Song	Row	1	2	3	4	5	Timer	Songs		Prize won	Ref.
17	July 31, 2021	25 Bourne to Hike Mountaineers #EverybodySingBundok	Sing in the Blank	"With a Smile" by Regine Velasquez	2						60 secs.	"Habang May Buhay"; AfterImage	"Tensionado" by Soapdish	₱25,000	—
17	July 31, 2021	25 Bourne to Hike Mountaineers #EverybodySingBundok	PicSing a Broken Song	"Jeepney" by Spongecola	1						60 secs.	"Tindahan Ni Aleng Nena" by Eraserheads	"Gaano Ko Ikaw Kamahal" by Celeste Legaspi	₱25,000	—
17	July 31, 2021	25 Bourne to Hike Mountaineers #EverybodySingBundok	EngliSing ang Lyrics	"It Must Have Been Love" by Roxette	4						60 secs.	"Sukob Na" by 17:28	"Ayoko Na Sana"; Ariel Rivera	₱25,000	—
17	July 31, 2021	25 Bourne to Hike Mountaineers #EverybodySingBundok	The ChooSing One	"Hari Ng Sablay" by Sugarfree	3						60 secs.	"Ako ay Pilipino" by Kuh Ledesma	"Hanggang Kailan" by Michael Pangilinan	₱25,000	—
17	July 31, 2021	25 Bourne to Hike Mountaineers #EverybodySingBundok	ReverSing	"Binibini" by Brownman Revival	5						60 secs.	"You'll Be Safe Here" by Rivermaya	"Kung Akin Ang Mundo" by Erik Santos	₱25,000	—
18	August 1, 2021	25 Bus, Jeepney, and Tricycle Drivers #EverybodySingDrivers	Sing in the Blank	"Estudyante Blues" by Freddie Aguilar	5						72 secs.	"Beautiful Girl" by Jose Mari Chan	"Sana'y Wala Nang Wakas" by Sharon Cuneta	₱500,000	—
18	August 1, 2021	25 Bus, Jeepney, and Tricycle Drivers #EverybodySingDrivers	TagaliSing	"Hindi Na Nga" by This Band	3						72 secs.	"Bawal Lumabas" by Kim Chiu	"Laging Tapat" by Jolina Magdangal	₱500,000	—
18	August 1, 2021	25 Bus, Jeepney, and Tricycle Drivers #EverybodySingDrivers	PicSing a Broken Song	"Hataw Na" by Gary Valenciano	1						72 secs.	"Malayo Pa Ang Umaga" by Rey Valera	"Twelve Days of Christmas"	₱500,000	—
18	August 1, 2021	25 Bus, Jeepney, and Tricycle Drivers #EverybodySingDrivers	The ChooSing One	"I'll Never Love This Way Again" by Dionne Warwick	4						72 secs.	"Kahit Isang Saglit" by Martin Nievera	"Paraiso" by Smokey Mountain	₱500,000	—
18	August 1, 2021	25 Bus, Jeepney, and Tricycle Drivers #EverybodySingDrivers	ReverSing	"Overdrive" by Eraserheads	2						72 secs.	"Iskul Bukol" by Tito Sotto, Vic Sotto and Joey de Leon	"Pakisabi Na Lang" by The Company	₱500,000	—

Week 10 (August 7–8, 2021)
Episode		Songbayanan	Preliminary rounds								Jackpot round (Everybody GuesSing)			Prize won	Ref.
Episode		Songbayanan	Game	Song	SingKo						Timer	Songs		Prize won	Ref.
No.	Airing date	Songbayanan	Game	Song	Row	1	2	3	4	5	Timer	Songs		Prize won	Ref.
19	August 7, 2021	25 Seafarers #EverybodySingDagat	Sing in the Blank	"Mahal Pa Rin Kita" by Rockstar	5						58 secs.	"Kung Tayo'y Magkakalayo" by Rey Valera	"Ikaw ang Pinili ng Puso Ko" by Fumiya Sankai and Yamyam Gucong	₱35,000	—
19	August 7, 2021	25 Seafarers #EverybodySingDagat	TagaliSing	"Torpedo" by Eraserheads	2						58 secs.	"O Come All Ye Faithful"	"Muntik Na Kitang Minahal" by The Company	₱35,000	—
19	August 7, 2021	25 Seafarers #EverybodySingDagat	PicSing a Broken Song	"High School Life" by Sharon Cuneta	3						58 secs.	"P.S. I Love You" by Sharon Cuneta	"Loving You by Nina Girado	₱35,000	—
19	August 7, 2021	25 Seafarers #EverybodySingDagat	The ChooSing One	"...Baby One More Time" by Britney Spears	1						58 secs.	"Tao" by Sampaguita	"Tayong Dalawa" by Rey Valera	₱35,000	—
19	August 7, 2021	25 Seafarers #EverybodySingDagat	ReverSing	"Babalik Ka Rin" by Gary Valenciano	4						58 secs.	"Tuliro" by Spongecola	"Pangarap Kong Pangarap Mo" by Zephanie	₱35,000	—
20	August 8, 2021	25 Labandero at Labandera #EverybodySingLaba	Sing in the Blank	"Mr. Cupido" by Rachel Alejandro	3						64 secs.	"If We Fall In Love" by Yeng Constantino	"This Time" by Freestyle	₱35,000	—
20	August 8, 2021	25 Labandero at Labandera #EverybodySingLaba	PicSing a Broken Song	"Through The Rain" by Mariah Carey	1						64 secs.	"Pumapag-ibig" by Marion Aunor	"Sirena" by Gloc-9	₱35,000	—
20	August 8, 2021	25 Labandero at Labandera #EverybodySingLaba	TagaliSing	"Push Mo Yan 'Teh" by Vice Ganda	4						64 secs.	"Catriona" by Matthaios	"Rock Baby Rock" by VST & Co.	₱35,000	—
20	August 8, 2021	25 Labandero at Labandera #EverybodySingLaba	The ChooSing One	"Pagbigyang Muli" by Erik Santos	5						64 secs.	"Hashtag (Show Me)" by Pacific Noise	"Di Na Muli" by Itchyworms	₱35,000	—
20	August 8, 2021	25 Labandero at Labandera #EverybodySingLaba	ReverSing	"Kay Ganda ng Ating Musika" by Hajji Alejandro	2						64 secs.	"Pagdating ng Panahon" by Ice Seguerra	"Sa'yo" by Silent Sanctuary	₱35,000	—

Week 11 (August 21–22, 2021)
Episode		Songbayanan	Preliminary rounds								Jackpot round (Everybody GuesSing)			Prize won	Ref.
Episode		Songbayanan	Game	Song	SingKo						Timer	Songs		Prize won	Ref.
No.	Airing date	Songbayanan	Game	Song	Row	1	2	3	4	5	Timer	Songs		Prize won	Ref.
21	August 21, 2021	25 Barangay Tanod #EverybodySingTanod	Sing in the Blank	"Pusong Bato" by Alon	1						70 secs.	"Sikat ang Pinoy" by Sam Milby and Toni Gonzaga	"Isang Bandila" by Rivermaya	₱25,000	—
21	August 21, 2021	25 Barangay Tanod #EverybodySingTanod	EngliSing ang Lyrics	"Weak" by SWV	4						70 secs.	"Peksman" by Siakol	"Never Ever Say Goodbye" by Nonoy Zuñiga	₱25,000	—
21	August 21, 2021	25 Barangay Tanod #EverybodySingTanod	The ChooSing One	"Titibo-Tibo" by Moira Dela Torre	3						70 secs.	"Jingle Bells"	"T.L. Ako Sayo" by Cinderella	₱25,000	—
21	August 21, 2021	25 Barangay Tanod #EverybodySingTanod	PicSing a Broken Song	"Superproxy" by Eraserheads	5						70 secs.	"Maging Sino Ka Man" by Rey Valera	"Goodboy" by Blakdyak	₱25,000	—
21	August 21, 2021	25 Barangay Tanod #EverybodySingTanod	ReverSing	"Bakit Pa Ba" by Jay R	2						70 secs.	"Philippine Geography" by Yoyoy Villame	"Pwede Ba" by Soapdish	₱25,000	—
22	August 22, 2021	25 Call Center Agents #EverybodySingCallCenter	Sing in the Blank	"Sayang Na Sayang" by Aegis	3						76 secs.	"Anak" by Freddie Aguilar	"So Many Questions" by Side A	₱500,000	—
22	August 22, 2021	25 Call Center Agents #EverybodySingCallCenter	TagaliSing	"Ang Boyfriend Kong Baduy" by Cinderella	2						76 secs.	"Araw-Araw" by Ben&Ben	"Someday" by Nina	₱500,000	—
22	August 22, 2021	25 Call Center Agents #EverybodySingCallCenter	The ChooSing One	"I'll Never Break Your Heart" by Backstreet Boys	5						76 secs.	"Para-paraan" by Nadine Lustre	"Love of My Life" by South Border	₱500,000	—
22	August 22, 2021	25 Call Center Agents #EverybodySingCallCenter	PicSing a Broken Song	"Dati" by Sam Concepcion and Tippy Dos Santos (feat. Quest)	4						76 secs.	"Esperanza" by April Boy Regino	"'Til I Found You" by Freestyle	₱500,000	—
22	August 22, 2021	25 Call Center Agents #EverybodySingCallCenter	ReverSing	"Kamusta Ka" by Rey Valera	1						76 secs.	"Gusto Kita" by Bailey May	"Buko" by Jireh Lim	₱500,000	—

Week 12 (August 28–29, 2021)
Episode		Songbayanan	Preliminary rounds								Jackpot round (Everybody GuesSing)			Prize won	Ref.
Episode		Songbayanan	Game	Song	SingKo						Timer	Songs		Prize won	Ref.
No.	Airing date	Songbayanan	Game	Song	Row	1	2	3	4	5	Timer	Songs		Prize won	Ref.
23	August 28, 2021	25 Flight Attendants #EverybodySingFlight	Sing in the Blank	"Nasa Iyo Na Ang Lahat" by Daniel Padilla	2						100 secs.	"Ililigtas Ka Niya" by Gary Valenciano	"Umaaraw, Umuulan" by Rivermaya	₱70,000	—
23	August 28, 2021	25 Flight Attendants #EverybodySingFlight	PicSing a Broken Song	"I Believe I Can Fly" by R. Kelly	5						100 secs.	"I Am But a Small Voice" by Lea Salonga	"Leaves" by Ben&Ben	₱70,000	—
23	August 28, 2021	25 Flight Attendants #EverybodySingFlight	EngliSing ang Lyrics	"He's Into Her" by BGYO	1						100 secs.	"Bituin" by Maymay Entrata	"Di Na Babalik" by This Band	₱70,000	—
23	August 28, 2021	25 Flight Attendants #EverybodySingFlight	The ChooSing One	"Bituing Walang Ningning" by Sharon Cuneta	4						100 secs.	"Boy" by Timmy Cruz	"Nasa Puso" by Janine Berdin	₱70,000	—
23	August 28, 2021	25 Flight Attendants #EverybodySingFlight	ReverSing	"Huwag Mo Nang Itanong" by Eraserheads	3						100 secs.	"Rainbow" by South Border	"Baka Ikaw" by The Company	₱70,000	—
24	August 29, 2021	25 Factory Workers #EverybodySingFactory	Sing in the Blank	"You Are My Song" by Regine Velasquez	1						68 secs.	"Kahit Gaano Kalaki" by Alynna	"Rain" by Donna Cruz	₱500,000	—
24	August 29, 2021	25 Factory Workers #EverybodySingFactory	PicSing a Broken Song	"Knocks Me Off My Feet" by Stevie Wonder	5						68 secs.	"Don't Know What To Do, Don't What You Say" by Ric Segreto	"Huwag Ka Lang Mawawala" by Ogie Alcasid	₱500,000	—
24	August 29, 2021	25 Factory Workers #EverybodySingFactory	The ChooSing One	"Kunin Mo Na Ang Lahat Sa Akin" by Angeline Quinto	2						68 secs.	"Umiiyak Ang Puso" by April Boy Regino	"Pop Goes The Weasel"	₱500,000	—
24	August 29, 2021	25 Factory Workers #EverybodySingFactory	TagaliSing	"Antukin" by Rico Blanco	4						68 secs.	"I Think I'm In Love" by Kuh Ledesma	"Chambe" by Alex Gonzaga	₱500,000	—
24	August 29, 2021	25 Factory Workers #EverybodySingFactory	ReverSing	"Kathang Isip" by Ben&Ben	3						68 secs.	"Binalewala" by Michael Dutchi Libranda	"Love Has Come My Way" by Kathryn Bernardo	₱500,000	—

Week 13 (September 4–5, 2021)
Episode		Songbayanan	Preliminary rounds								Jackpot round (Everybody GuesSing)			Prize won	Ref.
Episode		Songbayanan	Game	Song	SingKo						Timer	Songs		Prize won	Ref.
No.	Airing date	Songbayanan	Game	Song	Row	1	2	3	4	5	Timer	Songs		Prize won	Ref.
25	September 4, 2021	25 Tourism Industry Workers #EverybodySingTourism	Sing in the Blank	"Christmas in Our Hearts" by Jose Mari Chan	4						84 secs.	"Dear Heart" by Sharon Cuneta	"Always You" by Charice Pempengco	₱15,000	—
25	September 4, 2021	25 Tourism Industry Workers #EverybodySingTourism	PicSing a Broken Song	"Bulong" by Kitchie Nadal	5						84 secs.	"Tagu-taguan" by Moira Dela Torre	"Chuva Choo Choo" by Jolina Magdangal	₱15,000	—
25	September 4, 2021	25 Tourism Industry Workers #EverybodySingTourism	EngliSing ang Lyrics	"I'll Never Go" by Erik Santos	1						84 secs.	"Diamante" by Morissette	"Connected Na Tayo" by Jem Macatuno, Kiara, Lie Reposposa and Shawntel	₱15,000	—
25	September 4, 2021	25 Tourism Industry Workers #EverybodySingTourism	The ChooSing One	"One In a Million" by Larry Graham	3						84 secs.	"I'm Feeling Sexy Tonight" by Chona Cruz	"Scared To Death" by KZ Tandingan	₱15,000	—
25	September 4, 2021	25 Tourism Industry Workers #EverybodySingTourism	ReverSing	"Sundo" by Imago	2						84 secs.	"Bagong Umaga" by Agsunta	"Lumiliwanag ang Mundo sa Kwento ng Pasko" by All Star Cast	₱15,000	—
26	September 5, 2021	25 Stage Performers #EverybodySingPerformers	Sing in the Blank	"Miss Na Miss Kita" by Father and Sons	5						68 secs.	"Kikay" by Viva Hot Babes	"Ngayong Pasko Magniningning ang Pilipino" by Gary Valenciano and Toni Gonzaga	₱40,000	—
26	September 5, 2021	25 Stage Performers #EverybodySingPerformers	PicSing a Broken Song	"Chinito" by Yeng Constantino	2						68 secs.	"Sana" by I Belong To The Zoo	"Sorry Na, Pwede Ba?" by Rico J. Puno	₱40,000	—
26	September 5, 2021	25 Stage Performers #EverybodySingPerformers	EngliSing ang Lyrics	"Can't Smile Without You" by Barry Manilow	1						68 secs.	"Dulce Tirah-Tirah" by Denelle F	"Masdan Mo Ang Kapaligiran" by Asin	₱40,000	—
26	September 5, 2021	25 Stage Performers #EverybodySingPerformers	The ChooSing One	"Kundiman" by Silent Sanctuary	4						68 secs.	"Paniwalaan" by Blue Jeans	"Gigil si Aquo" by Vice Ganda	₱40,000	—
26	September 5, 2021	25 Stage Performers #EverybodySingPerformers	ReverSing	"Ang Buhay Ko" by Aegis	3						68 secs.	"Raise Your Flag" by Kritiko featuring KZ Tandingan	"Tinatapos Ko Na" by Jona	₱40,000	—

Week 14 (September 11–12, 2021)
Episode		Songbayanan	Preliminary rounds								Jackpot round Everybody GuesSing)			Prize won	Ref.
Episode		Songbayanan	Game	Song	SingKo						Timer	Songs		Prize won	Ref.
No.	Airing date	Songbayanan	Game	Song	Row	1	2	3	4	5	Timer	Songs		Prize won	Ref.
27	September 11, 2021	25 Pageant Winners #EverybodySingPageant	Sing in the Blank	"Be Careful With My Heart" by Jose Mari Chan and Regine Velasquez	2						72 secs.	"Hang On" by Gary Valenciano	"Halik sa Hangin" by Abra with Ebe Dancel	₱25,000	—
27	September 11, 2021	25 Pageant Winners #EverybodySingPageant	PicSing a Broken Song	"Bilanggo" by Rizal Underground	3						72 secs.	"Mga Anghel Na Walang Langit" by Kristel Fulgar	"Feel Good Pilipinas" by BGYO and KZ Tandingan	₱25,000	—
27	September 11, 2021	25 Pageant Winners #EverybodySingPageant	EngliSing ang Lyrics	"Line To Heaven" by Introvoys	1						72 secs.	"Sabihin Mo Na" by Top Suzara	"Ako Naman Muna" by Angela Ken	₱25,000	—
27	September 11, 2021	25 Pageant Winners #EverybodySingPageant	The ChooSing One	"Call Me Maybe" by Carly Rae Jepsen	5						72 secs.	"Awit ng Pangarap" by Yeng Constantino	"Magkaisa" by Virna Lisa	₱25,000	—
27	September 11, 2021	25 Pageant Winners #EverybodySingPageant	ReverSing	"Ikaw ang Lahat sa Akin" by Martin Nievera	4						72 secs.	"Ang sa Iyo ay Akin" by Aegis	"Kahit Ako'y Lupa" by Basil Valdez	₱25,000	—
28	September 12, 2021	25 Social Media Content Creators #EverybodySingContentCreator	Sing in the Blank	"Ikaw" by Yeng Constantino	2						76 secs.	"Silent Night"	"Pinasmile" by Daniel Padilla and Kathryn Bernardo	₱35,000	—
28	September 12, 2021	25 Social Media Content Creators #EverybodySingContentCreator	PicSing a Broken Song	"Sway" by Michael Bublé	3						76 secs.	"Bakit Mahal Pa Rin Kita" by Erik Santos	"Hahabol-habol" by Bobby Gonzales	₱35,000	—
28	September 12, 2021	25 Social Media Content Creators #EverybodySingContentCreator	EngliSing ang Lyrics	"214" by Rivermaya	1						76 secs.	"Tila" by Lani Misalucha	"Naaalala Ka" by Rey Valera	₱35,000	—
28	September 12, 2021	25 Social Media Content Creators #EverybodySingContentCreator	The ChooSing One	"Isa Pang Araw" by Sarah Geronimo	5						76 secs.	"Your Universe" by Rico Blanco	"Magsayawan" by VST & Co.	₱35,000	—
28	September 12, 2021	25 Social Media Content Creators #EverybodySingContentCreator	ReverSing	"Wag Mo Na Sanang Isipan" by Gary Valenciano	4						76 secs.	"Hulog ng Langit" by Donna Cruz	"Kakayanin Kaya" by Maymay Entrata	₱35,000	—

Week 15 (September 18–19, 2021)
Episode		Songbayanan	Preliminary rounds								Jackpot round (Everybody GuesSing)			Prize won	Ref.
Episode		Songbayanan	Game	Song	SingKo						Timer	Songs		Prize won	Ref.
No.	Airing date	Songbayanan	Game	Song	Row	1	2	3	4	5	Timer	Songs		Prize won	Ref.
29	September 18, 2021	25 National Athletes #EverybodySingAtleta	Sing In The Blank	"Buloy" by Parokya Ni Edgar	5						50 secs.	"Star ng Pasko" by Amber Davis and Marcus Davis	"Imposible" by KZ Tandingan	₱10,000	—
29	September 18, 2021	25 National Athletes #EverybodySingAtleta	PicSing a Broken Song	"Your Song" by Elton John	3						50 secs.	"You" by Basil Valdez	"Jam" by Cooky Chua and Kevin Roy	₱10,000	—
29	September 18, 2021	25 National Athletes #EverybodySingAtleta	TagaliSing	"Si Aida, Si Lorna o Si Fe" by Marco Sison	1						50 secs.	"Magmahal Muli" by Say Alonzo and Sam Milby	"Patawad, Paalam" by I Belong To The Zoo and Moira Dela Torre	₱10,000	—
29	September 18, 2021	25 National Athletes #EverybodySingAtleta	The ChooSing One	"A Smile In Your Heart" by Jam Morales	2						50 secs.	"Lead Me Lord" by Basil Valdez	"Kailangan Kita" by Leah Navarro	₱10,000	—
29	September 18, 2021	25 National Athletes #EverybodySingAtleta	ReverSing	"Handog" by Sarah Geronimo	4						50 secs.	"Panaginip" by Morissette	"Nag-iisang Bituin" by Angeline Quinto	₱10,000	—
30	September 19, 2021	25 Perya Performers #EverybodySingPerya	Sing in the Blank	"Bongga Ka Day" by Hotdog	2						64 secs.	"Kahapon Lamang" by Sharon Cuneta	"Bawal Na Gamot" by Willy Garte	₱35,000	
30	September 19, 2021	25 Perya Performers #EverybodySingPerya	TagaliSing	"Ewan" by Imago	5						64 secs.	"Pen Pen De Sarapen"	"We Wish You a Merry Christmas"	₱35,000	
30	September 19, 2021	25 Perya Performers #EverybodySingPerya	PicSing a Broken Song	"Conga" by Miami Sound Machine	4						64 secs.	"Somewhere In My Past" by Julie Vega	"Ikaw Sana" by Ogie Alcasid	₱35,000	
30	September 19, 2021	25 Perya Performers #EverybodySingPerya	The ChooSing One	"Pangako" by Regine Velasquez and Ogie Alcasid	3						64 secs.	"Saan Darating ang Umaga" by Raymond Lauchengco	"Para sa Masa" by Eraserheads	₱35,000	
30	September 19, 2021	25 Perya Performers #EverybodySingPerya	ReverSing	"Toyang" by Eraserheads	1						64 secs.	"Set You Free" by Side A	"Imahe" by Magnus Haven	₱35,000	

== 100 Songbayanan Special ==
From September 25 to October 10, 2021, the program aired special episodes dubbed as "100 Songbayanan Special" which were shot before the COVID-19 pandemic and the ABS-CBN shutdown. These special episodes featured the program's original format with 100 players, 10 rounds and a ₱2 million jackpot prize.

List of Everybody, Sing! 100 Songbayanan Special episodes
Episode		Songbayanan	Prize won	Ref.
No.	Airing date	Songbayanan	Prize won	Ref.
100 Songbayanan Special
1	September 25, 2021	100 Haircutters	₱300,000	
2	September 26, 2021	100 Haircutters	₱300,000	
3	October 2, 2021	100 Palengke Vendors (Wet Market Vendors)	₱400,000	
4	October 3, 2021	100 Palengke Vendors (Wet Market Vendors)	₱400,000	
5	October 9, 2021	100 Taal Survivors (January 2020 Taal Eruption Survivors)	₱2,000,000	
6	October 10, 2021	100 Taal Survivors (January 2020 Taal Eruption Survivors)	₱2,000,000	

Legend

- – The SONGpu contestant successfully guessed the line of the song correctly.
- – The SONGpu contestant failed to give any correct line of the song.
- – During the Jackpot round ("Everybody GuesSing"), the Songbayanan guessed the song correctly.
- – During the Jackpot round ("Everybody GuesSing"), the Songbayanan did not guess the song correctly.

Week 1 (September 25–26, 2021)
Episode		Songbayanan	Preliminary Rounds													Jackpot round (Everybody GuesSing)		Prize won	Ref.
No.	Airing date	Songbayanan	Game	Song	SONGpu											Timer	Songs	Prize won	Ref.
No.	Airing date	Songbayanan	Game	Song	Rows	1	2	3	4	5	6	7	8	9	10	Timer	Songs	Prize won	Ref.
31	September 25, 2021	100 Haircutters #EverybodySing100Buhok	Sing in the Blank	"Top of the World" by The Carpenters	1											79 secs.	"Maling Akala" by Brownman Revival	₱300,000	
31	September 25, 2021	100 Haircutters #EverybodySing100Buhok	Sing in the Blank	"Harana" by Parokya Ni Edgar	5											79 secs.	"Ipagpatawad Mo" by VST & Co.	₱300,000	
31	September 25, 2021	100 Haircutters #EverybodySing100Buhok	PicSing A Broken Song	"Waiting For Tonight" by Jennifer Lopez	10											79 secs.	"Magsimula Ka" by Leo Valdez	₱300,000	
31	September 25, 2021	100 Haircutters #EverybodySing100Buhok	PicSing A Broken Song	"Kahit Ayaw Mo Na" by This Band	2											79 secs.	"Later" by Fra Lippo Lippi	₱300,000	
31	September 25, 2021	100 Haircutters #EverybodySing100Buhok	EngliSing ang Lyrics	"You've Made Me Stronger" by Regine Velasquez	4											79 secs.	"Someone's Always Saying Goodbye" by Allona	₱300,000	
31	September 25, 2021	100 Haircutters #EverybodySing100Buhok	EngliSing ang Lyrics	"Breathless" by The Corrs	9											79 secs.	"O Pag-ibig" by Bailey May and Ylona Garcia	₱300,000	
32	September 26, 2021	100 Haircutters #EverybodySing100Buhok	The ChooSing One	"In Love Ako Sa'yo" by Darren Espanto	3											79 secs.	"Orange Colored Sky" by Nat King Cole	₱300,000	
32	September 26, 2021	100 Haircutters #EverybodySing100Buhok	The ChooSing One	"Catch Me I'm Falling" by Toni Gonzaga	7											79 secs.	"Limang Dipang Tao" by Ryan Cayabyab	₱300,000	
32	September 26, 2021	100 Haircutters #EverybodySing100Buhok	ReverSing	"Natatawa Ako" by Gabriella	8											79 secs.	"Semi-Charmed Life" by Third Eye Blind	₱300,000	
32	September 26, 2021	100 Haircutters #EverybodySing100Buhok	ReverSing	"Di Bale Na Lang" by Gary Valenciano	6											79 secs.	"Bato sa Buhangin" by Cinderella	₱300,000	

Week 2 (October 2–3, 2021)
Episode		Songbayanan	Preliminary Rounds													Jackpot round (Everybody GuesSing)		Prize won	Ref.
No.	Airing date	Songbayanan	Game	Song	Row	1	2	3	4	5	6	7	8	9	10	Timer	Songs	Prize won	Ref.
33	October 2, 2021	100 Palengke Vendors #EverybodySing100Palengke #ESPalengkeJackpot	Sing in the Blank	"Katawan" by Hagibis	2											66 secs.	"Hawak Kamay" by Yeng Constantino	₱400,000	-
33	October 2, 2021	100 Palengke Vendors #EverybodySing100Palengke #ESPalengkeJackpot	Sing in the Blank	"Total Eclipse of the Heart" by Bonnie Tyler	5											66 secs.	"Titibo-tibo" by Moira Dela Torre	₱400,000	-
33	October 2, 2021	100 Palengke Vendors #EverybodySing100Palengke #ESPalengkeJackpot	PicSing a Broken Song	"Magasin" by Eraserheads	7											66 secs.	"Bette Davis Eyes" by Kim Carnes	₱400,000	-
33	October 2, 2021	100 Palengke Vendors #EverybodySing100Palengke #ESPalengkeJackpot	PicSing a Broken Song	"Get Here" by Oleta Adams	4											66 secs.	"Estudyante Blues" by Freddie Aguilar	₱400,000	-
33	October 2, 2021	100 Palengke Vendors #EverybodySing100Palengke #ESPalengkeJackpot	EngliSing ang Lyrics	"Macarthur Park" by Donna Summer	3											66 secs.	"Paraisong Parisukat" by Basil Valdez	₱400,000	-
33	October 2, 2021	100 Palengke Vendors #EverybodySing100Palengke #ESPalengkeJackpot	EngliSing ang Lyrics	"Growing Up" by Gary Valenciano	9											66 secs.	"Better World" by Smokey Mountain	₱400,000	-
34	October 3, 2021	100 Palengke Vendors #EverybodySing100Palengke #ESPalengkeJackpot	The Choosing One	"Electric Youth" by Debbie Gibson	1											66 secs.	"Tainted Love" by Soft Cell	₱400,000	-
34	October 3, 2021	100 Palengke Vendors #EverybodySing100Palengke #ESPalengkeJackpot	The Choosing One	Forever's Not Enough by Sarah Geronimo	8											66 secs.	"Mahal Ka sa Akin" by Tootsie Guevara	₱400,000	-
34	October 3, 2021	100 Palengke Vendors #EverybodySing100Palengke #ESPalengkeJackpot	ReverSing	Bakit Nga Ba Mahal Kita by Roselle Nava	10											66 secs.	"Simple Lang" by Ariel Rivera	₱400,000	-
34	October 3, 2021	100 Palengke Vendors #EverybodySing100Palengke #ESPalengkeJackpot	ReverSing	Dahil Sa'yo by Inigo Pascual	6											66 secs.	"Isang Mundo, Isang Awit" by Leah Navarro	₱400,000	-

Week 3 (October 9–10, 2021)
Episode		Songbayanan	Preliminary Rounds													Jackpot round (Everybody GuesSing)		Prize won	Ref.
No.	Airing date	Songbayanan	Game	Song	Row	1	2	3	4	5	6	7	8	9	10	Timer	Songs	Prize won	Ref.
35	October 9, 2021	100 Taal Survivors #EverybodySing100Taal #EverybodySingTogether	Sing in the Blank	"Bonggahan" by Sampaguita	4											77 secs.	"Sayang Na Sayang" by Aegis	₱2,000,000	-
35	October 9, 2021	100 Taal Survivors #EverybodySing100Taal #EverybodySingTogether	Sing in the Blank	"Ikaw at Ako" by Moira and Jason	7											77 secs.	"Isang Linggong Pag-Ibig" by Imelda Papin	₱2,000,000	-
35	October 9, 2021	100 Taal Survivors #EverybodySing100Taal #EverybodySingTogether	PicSing a Broken Song	"Wind Beneath My Wings" by Bette Midler	8											77 secs.	"Pusong Bato" by Aimee Torres	₱2,000,000	-
35	October 9, 2021	100 Taal Survivors #EverybodySing100Taal #EverybodySingTogether	PicSing a Broken Song	"Time In" by Yeng Constantino	3											77 secs.	"Bukas Na Lang Kita Mamahalin" by Lani Misalucha	₱2,000,000	-
35	October 9, 2021	100 Taal Survivors #EverybodySing100Taal #EverybodySingTogether	EngliSing ang Lyrics	"This I Promise You" by NSYNC	2											77 secs.	"Yugyugan Na" by P.O.T.	₱2,000,000	-
35	October 9, 2021	100 Taal Survivors #EverybodySing100Taal #EverybodySingTogether	EngliSing ang Lyrics	"Before I Let You Go"; Freestyle	9											77 secs.	"Reaching Out" by Gary Valenciano	₱2,000,000	-
36	October 10, 2021	100 Taal Survivors #EverybodySing100Taal #EverybodySingTogether	The ChooSing One	"I Will Survive" by Gloria Gaynor	5											77 secs.	"Insomnia" by Craig David	₱2,000,000	-
36	October 10, 2021	100 Taal Survivors #EverybodySing100Taal #EverybodySingTogether	The ChooSing One	"Narito Ako" by Regine Velasquez	1											77 secs.	"Langis At Tubig" by Sharon Cuneta	₱2,000,000	-
36	October 10, 2021	100 Taal Survivors #EverybodySing100Taal #EverybodySingTogether	ReverSing	"Simpleng Tulad Mo" by Daniel Padilla	10											77 secs.	"Malayo Pa Ang Umaga" by Rey Valera	₱2,000,000	-
36	October 10, 2021	100 Taal Survivors #EverybodySing100Taal #EverybodySingTogether	ReverSing	"Pagsubok" by Orient Pearl	6											77 secs.	"Smoke Gets In Your Eyes" by The Platters	₱2,000,000	-

== Statistics ==
=== Scoring ===
==== Modified format ====
Number of correct answers in games during the modified version
Songbayanan	EngliSing ang Lyrics	LipSing	PicSing a Broken Song	Sing in the Blank	ReverSing	TagaliSing	The ChooSing One	Total	Average per game (Note: Rounded to the nearest whole number.)
25 community pantry volunteers	9	—	6	6	10	—	10	41	8
25 food and beverage service crew	7	—	6	5	5	—	10	33	7
25 janitors and cleaners	2	—	6	9	5	—	9	31	6
25 delivery riders	7	—	3	5	3	—	9	27	5
25 grocery frontliners	6	—	3	9	8	—	10	36	7
25 fitness instructors	7	—	5	8	2	—	8	30	6
25 massage therapists	—	—	5	6	8	8	10	37	7
25 security guards	8	—	5	2	2	—	10	27	5
25 PGH employees and volunteers	—	—	6	8	8	5	10	37	7
25 contact tracers	—	—	2	3	7	8	8	28	6
25 live online sellers	6	—	2	9	7	—	10	34	7
25 housekeepers	—	—	6	2	7	2	8	25	5
25 comedy bar performers	—	—	8	8	9	9	9	43	9
25 teachers	—	—	9	4	6	9	7	35	7
25 street food vendors	3	2	6	—	9	—	7	27	5
25 extras and talents	5	—	5	2	7	—	8	27	5
25 Bourne to Hike Mountaineers	6	—	6	1	7	—	9	29	6
25 bus, jeepney, and rickshaw drivers	—	—	4	6	7	5	8	30	6
25 seafarers	—	—	2	2	7	8	8	27	5
25 labandero at labandera	—	—	3	2	8	7	10	30	6
25 barangay tanod	8	—	4	5	6	—	7	30	6
25 call center agents	—	—	6	6	6	4	7	29	6
25 flight attendants	8	—	10	9	6	—	8	41	8
25 factory workers	—	—	3	4	7	5	10	29	6
25 tourism industry workers	9	—	7	5	10	—	6	37	7
25 stage performers	7	—	2	5	7	—	8	29	6
25 pageant winners	5	—	5	7	3	—	8	28	6
25 social media content creators	9	—	3	4	8	—	10	34	7
25 national athletes	—	—	4	2	3	6	8	23	5
25 perya performers	—	—	2	4	4	8	10	28	6
Average correct answers	7	2	5	5	6	6	9	31	6

==== Original format ====
Each game had two rounds in the original format; the last three groups of the season participated in this format:

Number of correct answers in games during the 100 Songbayanan Specials
Songbayanan	EngliSing ang Lyrics	PicSing a Broken Song	Sing in the Blank	ReverSing	The ChooSing One	Total	Average per game
Haircutters	15	12	13	11	17	68	14
Palengke vendors	11	12	11	10	12	56	11
Taal survivors	15	8	13	16	13	65	13
Average correct answers	14	11	12	12	14	63	13

==== Perfect scores ====
Groups that had a perfect game in a round (10 correct answers):

- PicSing a Broken Song: 1 (flight attendants)
- Sing in the Blank: 2 (community pantry volunteers, tourism industry workers)
- The ChooSing One: 11 (community pantry volunteers, factory workers, food and beverage service crew, grocery frontliners, labandero at labandera, live online sellers, massage therapists, perya performers, PGH employees and volunteers, security guards, social media content creators)

==== Almost perfect scores ====
Groups that almost had a perfect score in a game (9 out of 10 correct answers):

- EngliSing ang Lyrics: 3 (community pantry volunteers, social media content creators, tourism industry workers)
- PicSing a Broken Song: 1 (teachers)
- ReverSing: 4 (flight attendants, grocery frontliners, janitors and cleaners, live online sellers)
- Sing in the Blank: 2 (comedy bar performers, street food vendors)
- TagaliSing: 2 (comedy bar performers, teachers)
- The ChooSing One: 4 (Bourne to Hike Mountaineers, comedy bar performers, delivery riders, janitors and cleaners)

==== Half scores ====
Groups that had five right and wrong answers in a game:

- EngliSing ang Lyrics: 2 (extras and talents, pageant winners)
- PicSing a Broken Song: 3 (massage therapists, pageant winners, security guards)
- ReverSing: 5 (barangay tanod, delivery riders, food and beverage service crew, stage performers, tourism industry workers)
- Sing in the Blank: 2 (food and beverage service crew, janitors and cleaners)
- TagaliSing: 3 (bus, jeepney, and rickshaw drivers, factory workers, PGH employees and volunteers)

==== Low scores ====
Groups that had a low score in a game (0 to 4 correct answers):

- EngliSing ang Lyrics: 2 (janitors and cleaners, street food vendors)
- Lip-Sing: 1 (street food vendors)
- PicSing a Broken Song: 13 (barangay tanod, bus, jeepney, and rickshaw drivers, contact tracers, delivery riders, factory workers, grocery frontliners, labandero at labandera, live online sellers, national athletes, perya performers, seafarers, social media content creators, stage performers)
- ReverSing: 12 (Bourne to Hike Mountaineers, contact tracers, extras and talents, factory workers, housekeepers, labandero at labandera, national athletes, perya performers, seafarers, security guards, social media content creators, teachers)
- Sing in the Blank: 6 (delivery riders, fitness instructors, national athletes, pageant winners, perya performers, security guards)
- TagaliSing: 2 (call center agents, housekeepers)

=== Time collection and usage ===
- Most seconds banked by a group: 102 seconds (25 Comedy Bar Performers)
- Least seconds banked by a group: 50 seconds (25 National Athletes)
- Fastest group to win the jackpot round: TBA seconds (25 TBA)

=== Everybody, GuesSing? ===
- Groups that had a perfect score in the jackpot round: 7 (25 Community Pantries, 25 Massage Therepists, 25 Teachers, 25 Drivers, 25 Call Center Agents, 25 Factory Workers, and last but not least: 100 Taal Survivors during the 100-Player special)
- Groups that had an almost-perfect score in the jackpot round: 1 (25 Comedy Bar Performers)
- Groups that had the lowest score in the jackpot round: 2 (25 Tourism Industry Workers, 25 National Athletes)

== See also ==
- Everybody, Sing!
  - Everybody, Sing! season 1
  - Everybody, Sing! season 2
  - Everybody, Sing! season 3
- List of Everybody, Sing! season 2 episodes
- List of Everybody, Sing! season 3 episodes
