= Hagibis (disambiguation) =

Hagibis is a Filipino comic book character.

Hagibis may also refer to:

== Storms ==
- Typhoon Hagibis (2019)
- Tropical Storm Hagibis (2014)
- Typhoon Hagibis (2007)
- Typhoon Hagibis (2002)

== Other uses ==
- Hagibis (band), a Filipino boy band
  - Hagibis (album)
- Honda Hagibis, a defunct Philippine Basketball Association team

== See also ==
- Typhoon Hagibis (disambiguation), a list of tropical storms named Hagibis
