= Howlin' Dave =

Filipino radio disc jockey (1955–2008)

Dante David
- Born: July 16, 1955; Pasay, Philippines
- Died: May 26, 2008 (aged 52); Quezon City, Philippines
- Other names: Howlin' Dave
- Occupation: radio disc jockey

Dante David (July 16, 1955 – May 26, 2008) was a Filipino radio disc jockey. Better known by his stage name Howlin' Dave, he is credited with introducing Filipino radio listeners to Pinoy (Filipino) rock music in the early 1970s, and to new wave and punk rock in the 1980s.

Howlin' Dave grew up in Pasay and dropped out of high school. While enrolled in a Fine Arts course at the Philippine Women's University, he was hired as a radio announcer on DZRJ-AM in 1974. He adopted the name "Howlin' Dave" after the American blues singer Howlin' Wolf. He soon became the host of Pinoy Rock and Rhythm, a weekend thirty-minute radio program that featured the then-nascent Pinoy rock music. The program was credited with popularizing such Filipino rock acts as the Juan Dela Cruz Band, Asin and the singer Sampaguita. Howlin' Dave himself became known for his trademark mangled grammar and syntax, his atypical on-air use of the Tagalog language, and for his passionate and excitable delivery in his big booming voice. The drummer Pepe Smith called him "the best rock DJ the Philippines ever had.”

Howlin' Dave was also credited with introducing Filipino radio listeners to punk rock and new wave music beginning in the late 1970s, through his program New Wave Nights. His choice to promote punk music was controversial among his fellow deejays and with his station, but his program developed a following, with spikey-haired teens soon showing up at the radio station, drinking gin and breaking bottles. Between 1980 and 1985, Howlin' Dave hosted the annual 'Brave New World' punk concert, which he closed with his take on Sid Vicious's version of "My Way".

In the late 1980s, Howlin' Dave was diagnosed with a brain tumor, as well as several other health problems that left him house-bound for several years. In his later years, he hosted radio programs with DZRJ, ROCK 990, and NU 107. In 2001, he received a Lifetime Achievement Award at the NU Rock Awards. He died in May 2008, two days after collapsing at home following a stroke.
