= Ang Himig Natin =

Single by Juan de la Cruz Band

from the album Himig Natin
- Genre: Folk rock, soft rock
- Label: Vicor Music Corporation
- Songwriter(s): Pepe Smith

Ang Himig Natin (English: Our Hymn) is a song by Filipino Rock band Juan de la Cruz composed by Pepe Smith and was credited to mark the beginning of Pinoy rock music in the Philippines. The song was released and included in Juan de la Cruz's groundbreaking album Himig Natin in 1973 and was said to be the start of the origin of the term Pinoy Rock.
