= Jun Lopito =

Filipino guitarist (died 2022)

- Born: Wolfrando Lavalan Jr. September 25, 1957; Philippines
- Died: March 29, 2022 (aged 64)
- Genres: Rock, blues, reggae, alternative rock, progressive rock
- Occupation: Musician
- Instruments: Vocals, guitar
- Labels: Offshore Music

Wolfrando Lavalan Jr. (September 25, 1957 – March 29, 2022), professionally known as Jun Lopito, was a Filipino guitarist. He worked with most of the Philippines' rock bands and singers such as Pinoy rock legend Pepe Smith and ethnic singer Grace Nono.

== Early life ==
Born as Wolfrando Lavalan Jr., Jun Lopito was the son of Wolfrando Lavalan Sr. better known as "Lopito", a comedian and the original Filipino TV host of Tawag ng Tanghalan in the 1950s. Jun at the age of 8 was caught up in music after seeing The Beatles in concert in 1966. At the age of 17, he played blues and rock. In 1979, the alternative rock and blues band The Jerks was formed and he joined later in the year.

== Career ==
In 1976, Joey Smith of the Pinoy rock band Juan dela Cruz during its hiatus formed the band The Airwaves. In 1978, Lopito joined Anak Bayan along with drummer and lead vocalist Edmond "Bosyo" Fortuno, lead guitarist Gary Perez, and bassist Virgilio "Gil" Lemque. On that year, Anak Bayan released the song "Pagbabalik ng Kuwago" and it topped the charts before Lopito joined The Jerks whilst the remaining trio of Fortuno, Perez, and Lemque became the members of the backing band for Sampaguita by mid-1978. The band The Jerks was formed in 1979 and Lopito joined as a guitarist and left the band in the 90s. The album Bodhisattvas was released in 1995 as his first solo album on which he composed four of the eleven songs.

== Death ==
Jun died on March 29, 2022, at the age of 64.

== Awards ==
Year	Award giving body	Category	Nominated work	Results
1996	Awit Awards	Best Rock Recording	"Pure Souls"	Won
1996	NU Rock Awards	Guitarist of the Year	—N/a	Won
1998	Katha Awards	Best Rock Song	"Reklamo ng Reklamo"	Won
1998	NU Rock Awards	Best Album	"Reklamo ng Reklamo"	Won
