= Take Yokouchi =

Japanese musician

Take Yokouchi (横内 タケ, Yokouchi Take), born 22 February 1954 in Tokyo, is a musician best known for his work with the Japanese glam rock band Vodka Collins. Take (pronounced Ta-kay, real name Takehiro) was originally a live touring guitar player for the popular teen idol band The Four Leaves. When he was approached to join the new band Vodka Collins in 1971, it was on bass guitar. Yokouchi played bass on the 1973 Vodka Collins singles "Sands Of Time" and "Automatic Pilot" from the "Tokyo - New York" album released on the Toshiba-EMI Express label in November 1973.

== Late career ==
After Vodka Collins broke up in 1974, Take Yokouchi went back to playing guitar, ultimately forming the band Tensaw. Take Yokouchi did not take part in the later Vodka Collins reunion albums in the 1990s, being replaced by Masayoshi "Louis" Kabe, of The Golden Cups.
