= Vodka Collins (band) =

Japanese-American rock band (1971–73; 1996-99)

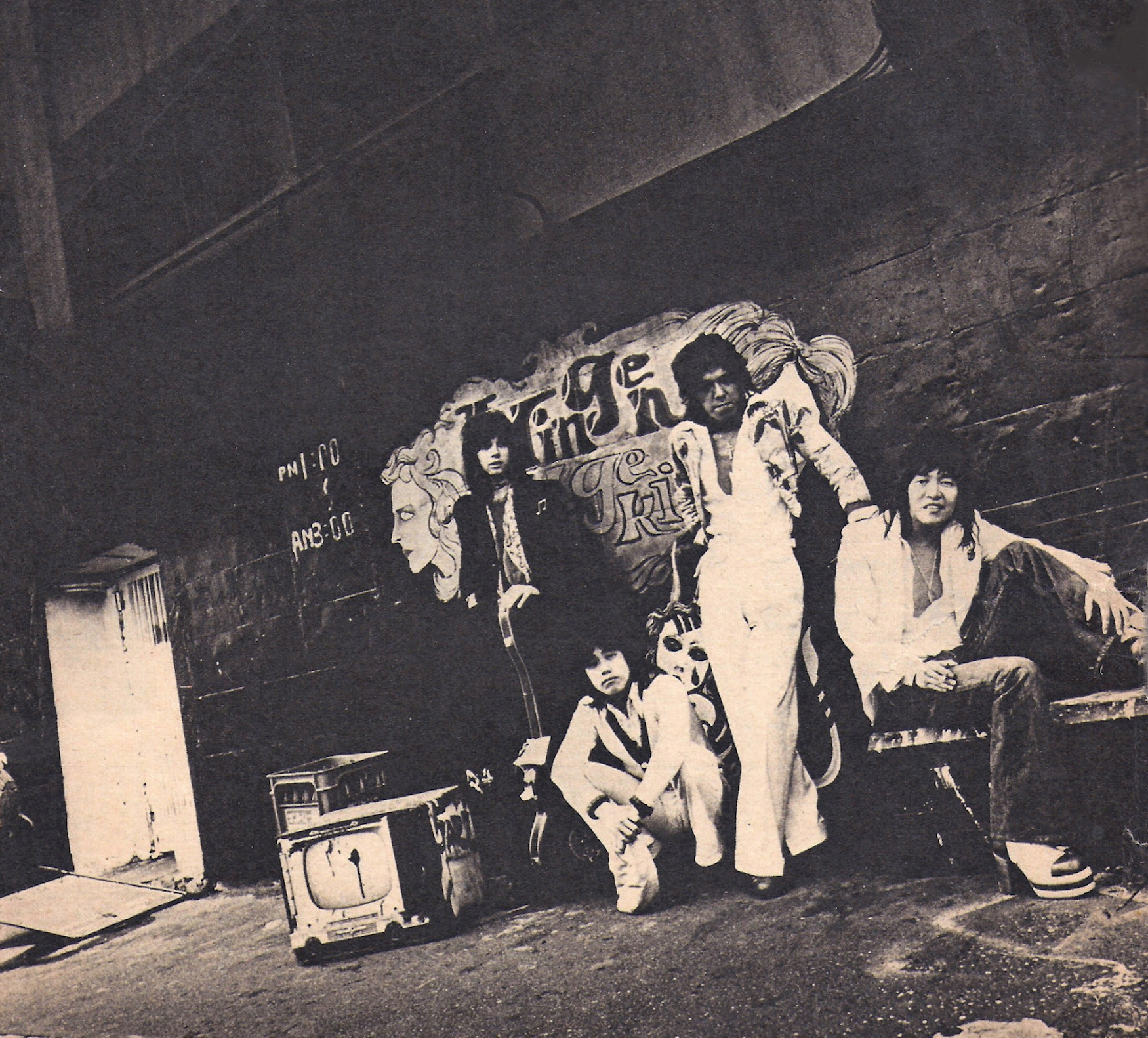
- Vodka Collins, circa 1972.

Background information
- Origin: Tokyo, Japan
- Genres: Glam rock
- Years active: 1971–1973, 1996-1999
- Labels: Toshiba EMI Records (1970s); Polystar (1990s)
- Members: Hiroshi Oguchi, Alan Merrill, Hiroshi "Monsieur" Kamayatsu, Take Yokouchi (until 1995) Masayoshi "Louis" Kabe (1995-2000)

Vodka Collins was a Tokyo-based Japanese-American rock band, formed in 1971. The band members were drummer Hiroshi Oguchi (formerly of The Tempters), singer-guitarist Alan Merrill, singer-guitarist Hiroshi "Monsieur" Kamayatsu (formerly of The Spiders) and bassist Take Yokouchi (formerly of the Four Leaves touring band, High Society). In later reunion recordings in the late 1990s, Yokouchi was replaced by Masayoshi "Louis" Kabe (formerly of The Golden Cups) on bass guitar.

Most of the band's released works were original compositions by the lead singer Alan Merrill. The band recorded four albums, the most well known being the glam rock Tokyo – New York, released in 1973 on Toshiba EMI Records. Later albums from the 1990s reunion period were Chemical Reaction, Pink Soup', Boy's Life and greatest hits compilation Boys In The Band. The band's most notable contribution was recording and releasing one of the first singles in the glam rock genre in Japanese, 1973's double A-sided single "Sands Of Time" and "Automatic Pilot" on Toshiba Express records.

Vodka Collins were the opening act on the Jackson 5's first show in Japan on April 27, 1973, at the Imperial Theater in Tokyo. The show was broadcast live on Fuji Television.

The band's founding member and drummer Hiroshi Oguchi died January 25, 2009. A memorial concert was given for him by all surviving band members on January 25, 2010, at the Duo Exchange in Tokyo, with Yoshihiro Tomioka taking Oguchi's place on drums. The band's rhythm guitarist, Hiroshi Kamayatsu, died on March 1, 2017. Lead singer Alan Merrill hosted a memorial concert for Kamayatsu with star guests in Tokyo in April 2017 at the Duo Music Exchange. Merrill and Kabe both died in 2020.

== Discography ==
- Tokyo – New York (1973)
- Chemical Reaction (1996)
- Pink Soup (1996)
- Boy's Life (outtakes compilation, 1998)
- Boys In The Band (greatest hits compilation, 2004)
