= Takayuki Inoue =

Takayuki Inoue may refer to:

- Takayuki Inoue, Japanese voice actor, best known as Tolle Koenig in Mobile Suit Gundam SEED
- Takayuki Inoue (musician), lead guitarist and backing singer of Japanese band The Spiders
