= Datu's Tribe =

Philippine rock band

- Origin: Laguna, Philippines
- Genres: Pinoy rock, Heavy metal
- Years active: 1989–1998, 2005-present
- Label: UMG Philippines
- Members: Eric Cabrera; Del Visperas; Mark Noval; Dax Padi
- Past members: Ceferino Pacio; Mel Visperas; Gerald Dacayan; Ian Cabanilla

Datu's Tribe is a Philippine rock band. Known for its songs "Sarsa Platoon" and "Praning", it was one of the bands that helped dominate the Philippine rock scene in the 90s, along with Wolfgang, Razorback, and Teeth.

== History ==
Datu's Tribe was formed in 1989 after the annual Battle of the Bands concert at the University of the Philippines Los Baños. The band consisted of Eric "Cabring" Cabrera on vocals, Del Visperas and Ceferino "Dos" Pacio, both on guitars, Mel Visperas on bass, and Gerald "Dax" Dacayan on drums. They first performed on Valentine's Day of 1990 in the university's free concert Unang Sigaw ng Unang Sigwa.

Datu's Tribe initially cover songs from various rock bands, including Guns N' Roses and the Juan de la Cruz Band. They soon started writing their own material, bringing in elements of alternative metal. In 1993, their song "Praning" was submitted to LA 105.9, where it received enough airplay and eventually topped the station's weekly countdown for 6 weeks in a row. They regularly performed in Club Dredd, in which club owner Patrick Reidenbach eventually manage Datu's Tribe.

In 1995, Datu's Tribe released their debut album Galit Kami sa Baboy, which includes "Praning", "Nakakalitong Mga Tao", and the band's signature song "Sarsa Platoon". It became a commercial success, selling more than 20,000 copies in a few months and eventually reaching Gold Record status. Moreover, the band was nominated as Best Rock Group in the Awit Awards and many other accolades. From hereon, the band embarked on several major tours across the country.

In July 1998, with the decline of the local alternative rock and the band's financial constraints, Datu's Tribe took a hiatus. The members took different respective jobs.

In 2005, Cabrera and Visperas reformed the band with Dax Padi on drums and Mark Noval on guitars. In April that year, Datu's Tribe released their EP Fat Burner. Those songs would later on appear in their second album Whoa! Pilipinas!, released in 2007. The album includes "Lakambini Bottom", "Para Que Elsa", and "Magtanggol".

== Discography ==
=== Albums ===
- 1995 - Galit Kami sa Baboy
- 2007 - Whoa! Pilipinas!

=== EPs ===
- 2005 - Fat Burner
