= Hagibis (album) =

Studio album by Hagibis
- Released: November 27, 1979
- Recorded: 1979
- Genre: Manila sound
- Label: Blackgold
- Producers: Mike Hanopol, Tony Huelves

Hagibis chronology
Hagibis (1979)	Huma Hagibis (1980)

Hagibis is the debut self-titled studio album by the first Filipino boyband Hagibis formed by leader, songwriter/composer and producer Mike Hanopol of Juan de la Cruz Band. Released on Blackgold Records (a sublabel of Vicor)

== Track listing ==
All tracks are written by Mike Hanopol except where noted.

Side one
No.	Title	Length
1.	"Ilagay Mo Kid" (Joey de Leon, Mike Hanopol)	5:06
2.	"Babae"	4:47
3.	"Nangigigil"	4:41
4.	"Legs"	5:21
Total length:		19:15

Side two
No.	Title	Length
1.	"Katawan"	6:07
2.	"Iduduyan Kita" (Mike Hanopol, Tony Huelves)	3:32
3.	"Bintana" (Mike Hanopol, T. Gloria)	4:18
4.	"Hagibis"	5:04
Total length:		19:02

== Credits ==
According to the album liner notes

Hagibis

- Sonny Parsons - vocals
- Bernie Fineza - vocals
- Mike Respall - vocals
- Joji Garcia - vocals
- Mon Picazzo - vocals

Personnel

- Mike Hanopol - vocals, arranger (rhythm section)
- Joey de Leon - songwriter, contributing vocals (1)
- Joel Ortega - vocals
- Yujin Baydal - vocals
- Tony Huelves - songwriter (6–7), producer
- Vic Jose - associate producer
- Lorrie Illustre - arranger (strings & bass), piano
- Panting Katindig - congas, whistle
- Nardi Manalastas - coordinator (strings & bass)
- Joe Katindig - cowbell, timbales, cabasa
- Jun Regalado - drums
- Dindo Aldecoa III, Edwin Luna - engineers
- Dindo Aldecoa III - mastered & mixed
- Edwin Que - design (cover)
- Dick Baldovino - photography
- Vic del Rosario Jr. - executive producer
