= Speed, Glue & Shinki =

Japanese musical trio

- Origin: Tokyo, Japan
- Genres: Heavy metal, hard rock, stoner rock, psychedelic rock
- Years active: 1970–1972
- Labels: Atlantic
- Past members: Joey Smith; Masayoshi Kabe; Shinki Chen; Mike Hanopol

Speed, Glue & Shinki (Japanese: スピード・グルー&シンキ, Hepburn: Supīdo, Gurū ando Shinki) was a Japanese heavy metal/psychedelic rock power trio formed in Tokyo in 1970 by guitarist Shinki Chen and record producer Ikuzo Orita. Initially consisting of Chen, Masayoshi Kabe on bass and Joey Smith on drums and vocals, they released one studio album before Masayoshi Kabe left during the recording sessions for the second studio album in late 1971. Joey Smith then recruited fellow Filipino musician Mike Hanopol into the band and released second studio album before disbanding in late 1972. Despite not receiving much acclaim while active, Speed, Glue & Shinki have since gained a cult following worldwide as a hidden gem of 1970s psychedelic rock.

== History ==
=== Formation ===
Ikuzo Orita produced a solo LP by Shinki Chen, who was considered the Japanese equivalent of Jimi Hendrix. The 1971 self-titled album features a group of backing musicians credited as "Shinki Chen & His Friends", including Golden Cups members George Yanagi and Masayoshi Kabe. After the release of Chen's debut LP, Orita took over the Japanese division of Atlantic Records and brought the guitarist over to the label. Orita then formed the trio Speed, Glue & Shinki with Kabe on bass, and Filipino singer-drummer Joey Smith, whom Chen had discovered performing with the band Zero History at a shopping center in Yokohama. The band took their name from Smith's use of amphetamines and Kabe's interest in sniffing Pro-Bond glue during the 1960s.

=== Career ===
Speed, Glue & Shinki released their debut album, Eve, in 1971 but split up shortly after due to mixed reviews, low sales, and Chen and Kabe not being able to tolerate Smith's personal life. After they disbanded, a large double-LP was independently released by Smith, titled Speed, Glue & Shinki, which was mostly the work of him and new bassist/co-lead vocalist Mike Hanopol, from Smith's band Zero History. Smith also sampled guitar recordings of Chen from previous studio work. The album featured two unreleased songs, titled "Sniffin & Snortin" and "Run And Hide", which were recorded for Eve but excluded from the final release as they did not fit the album's overall sound.

=== Aftermath ===
Due to Smith stealing his recordings, Chen took a dislike to recording music and decided to become solely a live musician, which he continues doing to this day. Kabe continued his own successful music career, most prominently with Char and Johnny Yoshinaga in the supergroup Pink Cloud, while Smith reinvented his stage persona as "Pepe Smith" and he and Hanopol returned to the Philippines, reuniting with their Zero History ex-bandmate and guitarist Wally Gonzalez, where the three became something of a phenomenon with their Pinoy rock power trio supergroup, Juan de la Cruz Band. Joey Smith died in January 2019 aged 71. Masayoshi Kabe died in September 2020 aged 70.

On December 25, 2019, both of the group's albums were officially reissued on vinyl by Atlantic, the first official vinyl reissues of the albums in 48 years in Japan.

On October 6, 2021, Super Fuji Discs released a live album dating from 1971 titled Maahngamyauh.

On April 23, 2022, Atlantic / Run Out Groove reissued Eve for Record Store Day 2022 in the United States, marking the first time the album was officially released outside of Japan.

== Members ==
- Joey Smith – drums, vocals (1970–1972; died 2019)
- Masayoshi Kabe – bass (1970–1972; died 2020)
- Shinki Chen – guitar (1970–1972)
- Mike Hanopol – bass, vocals (1972)

== Discography ==
Studio albums

- Eve (1971)
- Speed, Glue & Shinki (1972)

Singles

- "Mr. Walking Drugstore Man" (1971)
- "Run And Hide" (1972)

Live albums

- Maahngamyauh (2021)
