= Yokouchi =

Yokouchi (written: 横内) is a Japanese surname. Notable people with the surname include:

- Akinobu Yokouchi (横内 昭展; born 1967), Japanese footballer
- Shōmei Yokouchi (横内 正明; 1942–2020), Japanese politician
- Tadashi Yokouchi (横内 正; born 1941), Japanese actor
- Take Yokouchi (横内 タケ), Japanese musician
