= Lolita Carbon =

Filipina singer and songwriter

- Also known as: Nene Carbon
- Born: Lolita Carbon; 13 November 1957 (age 68)
- Origin: Manila, Philippines
- Genres: Pinoy rock, folk
- Occupation: Singer-songwriter
- Instruments: Guitar, vocals
- Years active: 1970–present
- Labels: Vicor Music; Ivory Music Philippines

Lolita Carbon (born 13 November 1957) is a Filipina singer and songwriter best known for her work with the musical group, Asin, and her influence in the Pinoy Folk rock genre. She has been active as a composer and performer from 1970 to the present day who performs in the Philippines as well as internationally. She is known for her songs "Masdan Mo ang Kapaligiran", "Ang Buhay Ko", "Pagbabalik", "Himig ng Pag-ibig" and "Usok".

== Career ==
Carbon grew up in Malate, Manila. At age 10, she won a singing contest on the radio program Tita Betty's Children's Show with a performance of "The Impossible Dream". At age 13, she held a 6 month residency as a singer with the Philippine Navy Band N2 Division and sang songs by Shirley Bassey. Despite her father's wishes, Carbon decided to drop out of high school to pursue a career in music.

By 1976, Carbon had become an active musician who was booked to a full-time singing slot at a club called the Kola House. At that time, the Filipino popular music scene was undergoing a folk music revival associated with the Pinoy Rock movement. While working at the Kola House, Carbon met fellow musicians Cesar Bañares Jr. and Mike Pillora Jr. and together with them, she would eventually form the ensemble known as Asin. One of the band's early successes came when they were signed by a record company and Carbon was tasked with singing a Japanese overdub of the hit song Anak, written by fellow filipino musician Freddie Aguilar.

While the band saw great success and popularity, Carbon and the other band members had extremely turbulent relationships. After alternating periods of collaboration and hiatus, Asin officially disbanded in 1990. From the time since, Carbon contributed to many musical collaborations. She was a part of an album 'supergroup', Lokal Brown (known for their radio hit, "This Is Not Amerika") in 1990; and in 1991 formed her own band by the name of Nene. In 2012, she formed the vocal trio, Tres Marias, with fellow female musicians Cooky Chua and Bayang Barrios.

== Personal life ==
Carbon was married twice and has four children.

== Contributions ==
Through her work with Asin, Carbon has contributed to the representation of indigenous Filipino instruments in popular music. She is also notable as a female band leader who has been consistently performing with various outfits since the 1970s.

== Collaborations ==
- One Way Up Band
- Asin
- Lolita and The Boys
- Sulabama
- Holy Smoke Band
- Lokal Brown
- NENE
- Tres Marias

== Honors and awards ==
- Winner, singing contest on Tina Betty’s Children’s Show at age 10 for a performance of “The Impossible Dream”
- Best Folk Song of the Year for “Pagbabalik” - Aliw Awards 1978
- Best Rock Recording for "Paraisong Liku-liko" - AWIT Awards 1990
- Best Musical Arrangement for "Dalawang Dekada ng ASIN (Overture)" (a classical arrangement of all of ASIN's top hit songs) - AWIT Awards 2002
