= Dominion (Filipino band) =

Filipino rock band

- Origin: Manila, Philippines
- Genres: Pinoy rock, goth rock
- Labels: Subkulture
- Members: Doi Porras (Vocals); Gary Gimena (Bass); Roldan Rapisora (Guitars); Dan Whitmore (Drums); Krystal (Guitars)
- Past members: Mike Strange (Vocals, Guitars); Iman Leonardo (Bass); Raymund Paras (Guitar); Ady Baesa (Synth); Mario Zialcita (Drums); Czandro Pollack (Synth); Paul Casper (Guitar); Rhyknow (Guitar); Mark King (Bass); Michael Ramos (Guitars); Luis Murillo (Bass); Dave Jurgens (Drums); Ollie Palma (Synths); Arnel Paminiano (Bass); Robert Ballesteros (Drums); Tolitz Rosel (Synths); Hector Aguilar (Guitars); Jade Figueroa (Guitars)
- Website: www.dominionvisions.com

Dominion is a rock band originally formed in Manila, Philippines in 1994.

Often credited as a forerunner in Filipino styled goth music by the Philippine media. Some of their songs are in Tagalog, a Philippine language.

== History ==
Dominion was formed in 1994 by members of various local live bands that frequented the Manila rock club scene. Songwriter/drummer Doi Porras, then of the band Psycho Candle, was seeking a more atmospheric musical vehicle.

This led to the recruitment of the First Line-up responsible for the cult tracks "Margaux", "Within these Walls" & "The Hand of Cain" EP. Not long after, The Band found themselves back in the thick of Manila's Live Rock Circuit again but this time without a name. It is said that due to a Sisters of Mercy Track being looped endlessly for days, Singer Mike Strange Hesitantly responded to an Overbearing club patron that the Band's name was Dominion, This stuck and the Band retained it out of convenience.

More shows, A well defined Image and a residency at the influential Manila Rock Club; Club Dredd, Finds the Band attracting and inspiring a growing audience that mostly emerges in black. The Band's Dark Image and sound in a Dominantly Catholic Country catches the Eye of Mainstream Media and ensues the band being featured various times over National TV, Most Notably Being International Music Channel Channel V guesting the band on a special feature and exposing them to a Larger Asian Market outside the Philippines.

Despite this, it is noted that the band seems to have a recluse and lax attitude on releasing records or singles. Almost giving an idle impression of not wanting to sell anything, they are notorious for not releasing anything for years, and those that are available are very difficult to find. The Band regularly cites British Bands and Artists such as The Cure, The Sisters of Mercy, The Cult, Bauhaus, Peter Murphy and Fields of the Nephilim as Major Influences.

In 1997, Major label Alpha Records invited the band to work with them on a CD compilation entitled The Alpha Numeric Sampler, and the band's cult track "Within These Walls" was released to the public. Unfortunately, The band was not consulted on the mixing phase of recording and this incident resulted in what the band felt an inferior version of track, due to this, Dominion released under its own Independent label and re-released a proper version of "Within these walls" as illustrated by the Debut EP " The Hand of Cain".

Subkulture Records, an Independent label co-founded by Doi Porras, was later formed to release Dominion's music exclusively. The EP Hand of Cain was released by the band, which included a proper remixed track of "Within These Walls". Philippine Rock Magazines such as Pulp and Lemon celebrated the band as "Pioneers of Philippine Goth Rock", including Newspapers also describing them as such.

Although their current Reverbnation page refers to their sound as "Gloom Rock".

The band has shared stages with Japan's Eve of Destiny, Közi (ex-Malice Mizer), Skeletal Family (UK), Former Humans (US), Peeling Grey (US), The Last Cry (UK) and Strap on Halo (US), amongst others.

== Recent work ==
In 2012, Dominion resurfaced with a new lineup and a single entitled "Mandirigma". They have been playing selected shows in California, particularly San Francisco and Los Angeles. ["The Examiner". Archived from the original on 4 March 2016.]

== Last known releases ==
- Luksa
- Mandirigma
- Father Chains

== Media appearances ==
- Dominion in Pulp Magazine: Philippine Gothic Scene
