= Sampaguita (singer) =

Pinoy rock singer

- Born: María Teresa Alfonso; Pangil, Laguna
- Genres: Pinoy rock
- Occupations: Musician; songwriter
- Years active: 1977–1994, 2010–present
- Labels: Vicor Music; Alpha Records

Maria Teresa Alfonso, also known as Tessy Alfonso and better known by her stage name Sampaguita, is a Pinoy rock singer from the Philippines, active during the 1970s and 1980s. Sampaguita had released several albums and songs that went successful and are now considered classics. She is also dubbed as the "Queen of Filipino rock music."

== Origins ==
Sampaguita started out as a model under then-First Lady Imelda Romualdez-Marcos' Bagong Anyo. She was discovered by her then-husband Nilo Santos. Her stage name was coined by the percussionist Nick Boogie, after the species of jasmine locally known as sampaguita, which is also the national flower. Her first performance was at the New Moon Concert in 1977 at the Folk Arts Theater in Pasay, Metro Manila.

== Present ==
In 1994, Alfonso retired from the Philippine music scene when according to her own words: "[Life became] too dangerous, with sex, drugs and rock and roll, rock until you drop."

In 1996, She released an album "Laguna".

On December 3, 2010, she went onstage again at the Ugat, The Legends of Pinoy Folk Rock concert held at the Araneta Coliseum. She performed along with other Filipino rock artists from the 1970s and 1980s.

== Personal life ==
Alfonso is the mother of three children: Dolly and Kowboy Santos (with Nilo Santos), and Jacinta Romero (with Miguel Romero). Kowboy Santos, is also a musician, and is the frontman of the band Generation. Alfonso currently resides in Parañaque with Romero and their daughter, Jacinta.

== Discography ==
=== Albums ===
Title	Year
Sampaguita	1978
Vol. 2	1980
Beatwave	1984
Nosi Ba Lasi	1989
Sa Ngayon	1992
Laguna	1996

=== Songs ===
1. Babalik Sa Iyo
2. Beat Wave
3. Blind Date
4. Bonggahan
5. CB Gypsy
6. Chance to Change
7. Children No Longer Young
8. Crazy Tonite
9. Easy Pare
10. Estudyante Blues
11. Go Find Another One
12. Hanggang Saan
13. I'm Behind You
14. I'm Sorry
15. Kumadre
16. Laguna
17. Liwanag
18. Mahamantra
19. Mahilig
20. Napupuyat
21. New Moon Dance
22. No Guidance
23. Nosi Ba Lasi (Hit Single 1989)
24. Para Sa Iyo
25. Sa Diyos Lamang
26. Sa Isip Di Mabura
27. Salamat
28. Sayawan
29. Takipsilim
30. Tao
31. The Party
32. Uling

=== Music ===
1. Salamat
2. Tao

=== Lyrics ===
1. Salamat
2. Tao
3. Babalik Sa Iyo
4. CB Gypsy
5. I'm Behind You
6. Kumadre
7. Liwanag
8. Salamat
9. Sayawan
10. Tao

== See also ==
- Aegis (band)
- Asin
- Freddie Aguilar
- Juan de la Cruz Band
- Mike Hanopol
