= Hiroshi Kamayatsu =

Japanese singer and guitarist (1939–2017)

Hiroshi Kamayatsu かまやつ ひろし
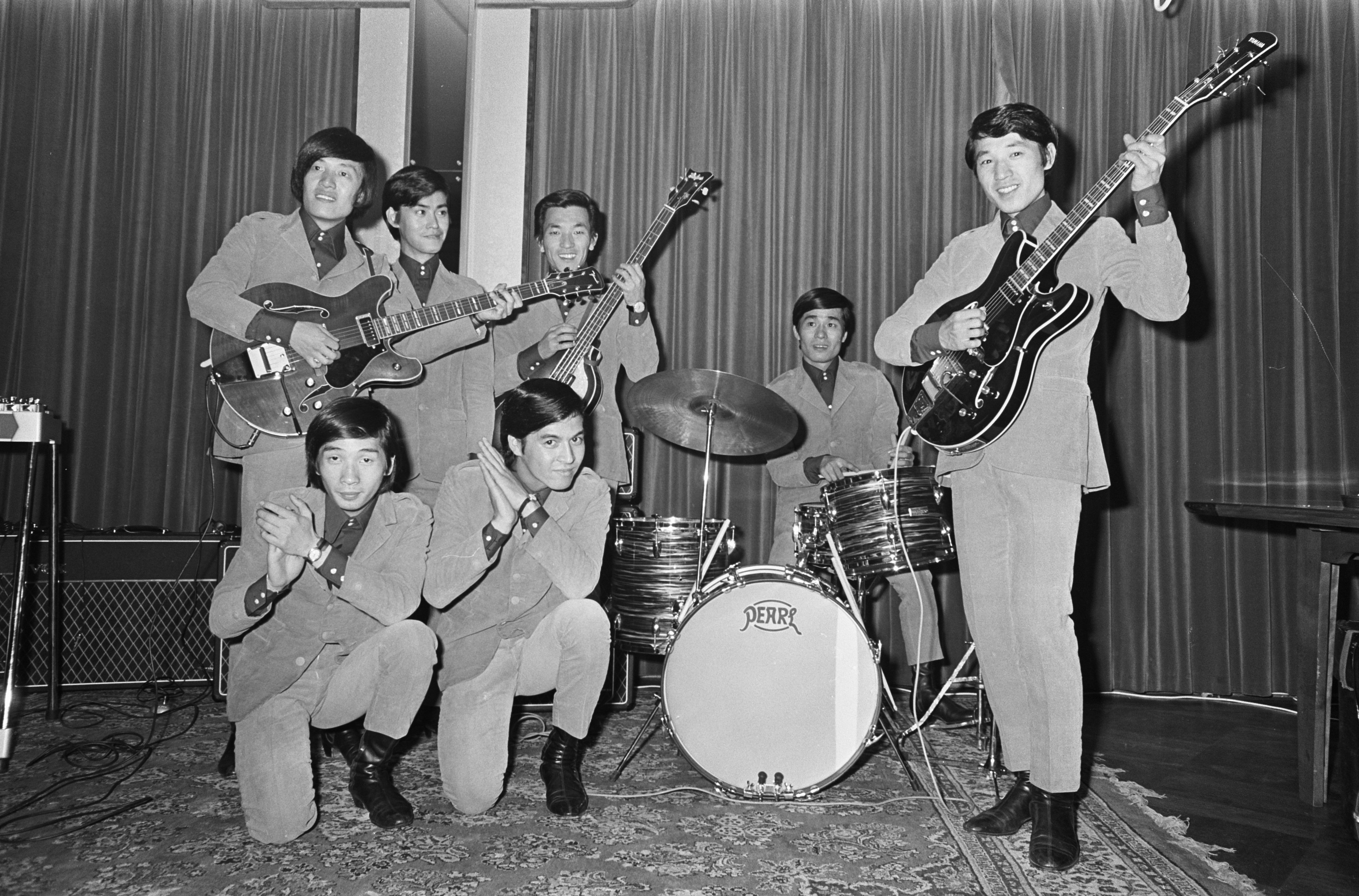
- Kamayatsu, 1966

Background information
- Also known as: Monsieur
- Born: 釜萢 弘 January 12, 1939; Tokyo Prefecture (1868–1943), Empire of Japan
- Died: March 1, 2017 (aged 78)
- Genres: Group sounds, contemporary folk, rock, rock and roll
- Occupations: Folk singer Composer; DJ; Guitarist
- Instruments: Singing; Guitar (Steinberger GL-2T, Vox Mark 4, Rickenbacker 345)
- Labels: Teichiku Records, Philips Records (as Phonogram Japan), EXPRESS, Warner Music Japan, For Life Music, avex io
- Formerly of: The Spiders, Vodka Collins, Sans Filtre

Hiroshi "Monsieur" Kamayatsu (かまやつひろし, Kamayatsu Hiroshi; 12 January 1939 – 1 March 2017) was a Japanese singer and guitarist born in Tokyo.

He composed the music for Download, a direct-to-video anime release based on PC Engine games.

== Profile ==
"Monsieur" was a founding member of bands The Spiders, Vodka Collins, and also a solo act.

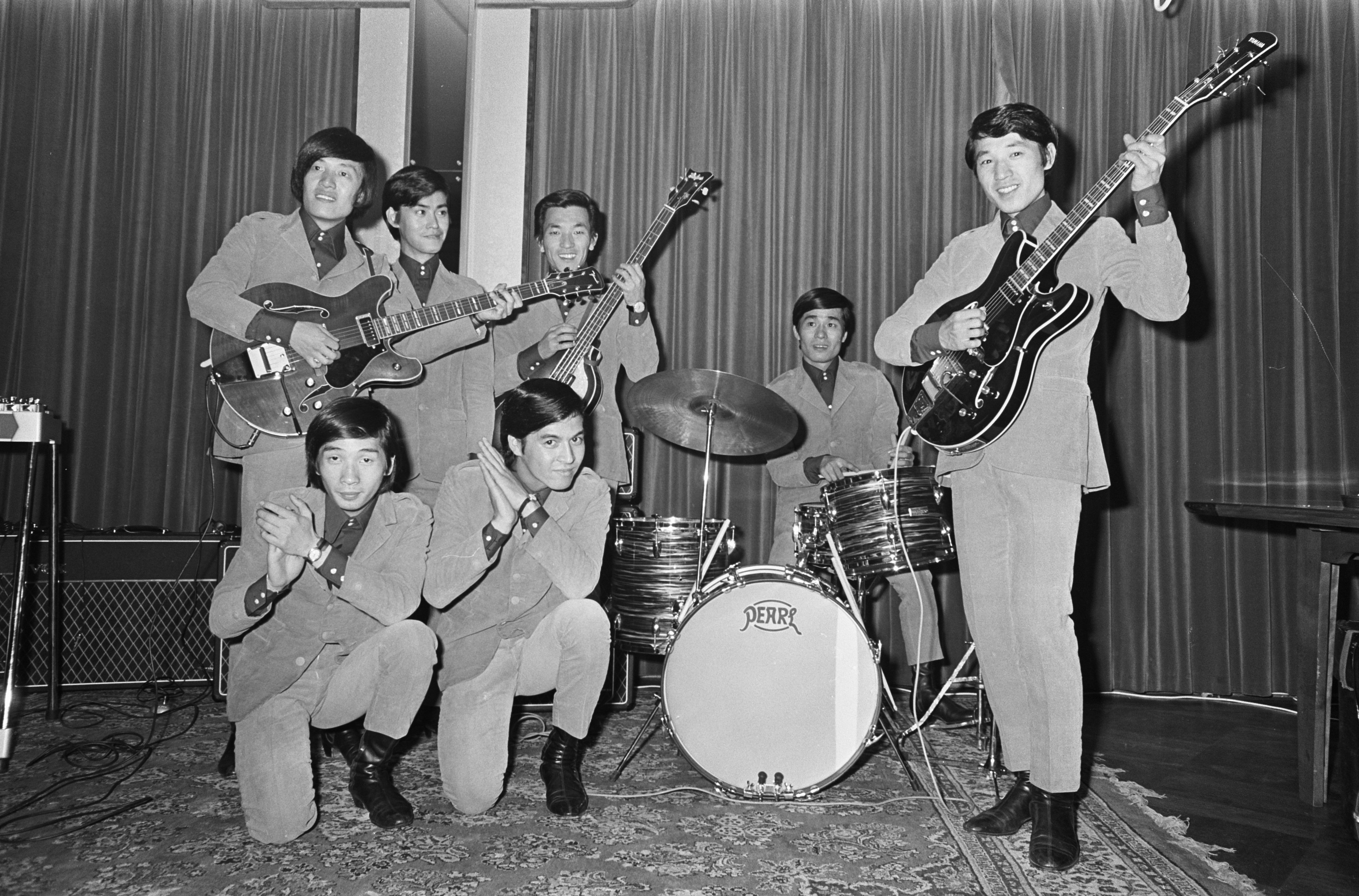
Hiroshi (top left) with The Spiders in 1966

In 2001 he had a reunion with some former members of The Spiders, as the band Sans Filtre. Among his recent work was his performance of the song "RTB", the ending song to the anime Sentou Yousei Yukikaze. He performed for over five decades. He also had a cameo appearance as a priest in 1984's "The Return of Godzilla".

== Death ==
Kamayatsu died from pancreatic cancer on 1 March 2017, aged 78.
