= Hagibis (band) =

Filipino band

- Origin: Manila, Philippines
- Genres: Manila sound; pop; disco; OPM
- Years active: 1979–1997; 2013-present
- Past members: Bernie Fineza; Joji Garcia; Sonny Parsons; Mon Picazo; Mike Respall; Pete Gatela; Carlos Parsons

Hagibis is a Filipino disco group best known for their macho image, on-stage costumes, and macho songs about women. Originally formed by Juan dela Cruz Band singer and bassist Mike Hanopol and record executive Vic del Rosario, they are cited as the "first boyband in the Philippines" and later were dubbed the "Filipino Village People", The original line-up was composed of Sonny Parsons, Bernie Fineza, Mike Respall, Joji Garcia and Mon Picazo.

== History ==
According to Mike Hanopol, who composed almost all of Hagibis' tracks, Vic del Rosario wanted to recruit famous actors and singers for a new singing group, but later changed his mind, and instead, recruited unknown musicians. Hanopol also revealed in the same interview that he also sung the band's recorded songs himself. Sonny Parsons said during Hagibis' guest appearance on Tonight with Arnold Clavio that he originally auditioned for VST & Co. before joining Hagibis. The group borrowed some elements of the American disco group Village People, such as the line dancing, leather clothing, and accompaniment of motorcycles.

In 1980, the film Dolphy's Angels was released which contained a musical number by Hagibis.

Tony Ferrer's directorial debut, the musical film Legs... Katawan... Babae! which premiered on July 2, 1981, was a film vehicle for the group. The film co-stars Myrna Castillo, Laarni Enriquez, Dinah Dominguez, and Val Iglesias. That same year in Lito Lapid's Macho Gigolo, Hagibis performed its theme song.

Group member Sonny Parsons would go on to be a director and action star in the film industry.

The new lineup of Hagibis appeared on Tonight with Arnold Clavio in 2014 with Sonny Parsons, Mike Respall, Carlos Parsons and Pete Gatela.

Original members Bernie Fineza died on January 15, 2015 and Sonny Parsons died on May 10, 2020.

In a Facebook post by the band on October 22, 2021, original member Mike Respall announced that Pete Gatela was given the authority to select the new members of the group. Gatela was recruited in 2009 by original members Sonny Parsons, Mike Respall and Bernie Fineza; and was also accepted by Mike Hanopol.

While The Group Of Pete Gatela is looking for a Favorable member, Mike Hanopol Recruited a member Yujin Baydal to make a new version of Hagibis In this Generation 2024 to continue the legacy of Late Sonny Parsons; and was accepted by Mike Hanopol Going on shows back to back.

In 2025, brand disputes emerged between the Hagibis group of Carlos Parsons (brother of the late Sonny Parsons) and Pete Gatela, and Hagibis Live of Yujin Baydal. Gatela and Parsons accused Baydal of tarnishing the legacy and claim that because they performed with the original members, they are the “rightful” owners of the Hagibis trademark. Yujin Baydal denied the accusations, saying that he was personally handpicked by Hagibis co-creator Mike Hanopol to continue the Hagibis legacy through Hagibis Live. Nonetheless, Baydal, with the endorsement of Hanopol, continued scouting for new talent to complete the new lineup.

In 2026, Hagibis Live received further endorsement by surviving original members Mike Respall and Joji Garcia, while it continued to set out finding new members for its new 5-man lineup. On October 20, Hagibis Live announced its 5-man lineup: Yujin, Erich, Darryl, CM and JP.

In the poster posted on Mike Hanopol's Facebook account for July 2026, the new Hagibis Rock has been included in their promotional posters. This hints that Yujin Baydal's Hagibis Live band is no longer directly endorsed by Mike Hanopol.

Even on October 14, 2026, it can be seen that Mike Hanopol has posted a video with Hagibis Rock as the contributor, for a performance at D'Frame Bar during their September 19, 2026 performance. This signifies that Mike Hanopol is performing with Hagibis Rock. On the other hand, no recent information or post has been seen by this time in regards to Mike Hanopol performing with Hagibis Live or with Yujin Baydal himself.

On October 27, Hagibis Live signed a recording contract with Viva Records, marking a reunion for the name Hagibis with one of its co-creators, Vic Del Rosario. As seen in the pictures posted by Viva Records, Mike Hanopol was not present at this moment.

On October 28, 2026, Mike Hanopol posted 2 text posts, reminding owners of the bar that those with "Hagibis" in their names are not allowed to use his songs anymore.

On October 30, 2026, Mike Hanopol has reposted a post under the official page of Hagibis Rock in regards to the controversy behind the Hagibis trademark and Hagibis Live signing a record contract with Viva Records without the presence of Mike Hanopol himself. Alongside the controversy on Yujin Baydal and the post of Mike Hanopol in regards to the usage of songs at bars while stating to be "Hagibis", they have revealed that Yujin Baydal is not authorized by Mike Hanopol to use the name and songs composed for Hagibis. Mike Hanopol has acknowledged the claim that Hagibis Rock is the only authorized Hagibis related group as of October 30, 2026. From the original post's screen shot, it can be seen that Hagibis Live refuses to admit or acknowledge the ongoing issue of custody when questioned.

== Discography ==
=== Albums ===
Title	Album details
Hagibis	Released: November 27, 1979; Label: Blackgold
HumaHagibis	Released: November 4, 1980; Label: Blackgold
Walang Katapat	Released: 1997; Label: Star Music

=== Compilations ===
- 1994: Katawan
- 2012: OPM Back to Back Hits (with VST & Co.)

=== Songs ===
- "Lalake"
- "Katawan" (1979) (former theme song of the popular comedy show Palibhasa Lalake from 1987 to 1998 on ABS-CBN 2; also covered by Parokya Ni Edgar in 2002's Edgar Edgar Musikahan and also the theme song of the movie channel, Cine Mo!)
- "Legs" (1979)
- "Babae"
- "Ilagay Mo Kid"
- "Nanggigigil" (1979) (also covered by TNT Boys in 2018 & iDolls in 2021)
- "Malikot"
- "Mama Monchang"
- "Mandurugas"
- "Maginoo"
- "G.R.O."
- "O.C.W."
- "Macho"
- "Walang Gulat"
- "Damit"
- "Darating Ako"
- "Hard to Let You Go"
- "A Feeling Just for You"

== Filmography ==
=== Film ===
- 1981: Legs, Katawan, Babae

== See also ==
- Manila sound
