= Wally Gonzalez =

Filipino bluesman and guitarist (1949–2021)

- Also known as: Wally Gonzales
- Born: December 27, 1949; Sampaloc, Manila, Philippines
- Died: July 23, 2021 (aged 71) Parañaque, Philippines
- Genres: Pinoy rock
- Occupation: Guitarist
- Instruments: Guitar (electric, acoustic and dobro)
- Years active: 1960s–2021
- Formerly of: Juan de la Cruz Band

Wally Gonzalez (December 27, 1949 – July 23, 2021) was a Filipino bluesman, guitarist and proponent of Pinoy rock. Gonzalez formed and led the Juan de la Cruz Band which, with the collaboration of bassist-vocalist Mike Hanopol and drummer-vocalist Pepe Smith, rose to unprecedented national prominence as a power trio.

== Early career ==
Wally Gonzalez formed the Juan de la Cruz Band with drummer Edmond Fortuno in 1968, although the collaboration was disrupted by Fortuno's departure and splinter group, Anak Bayan. Left to his own devices, Gonzalez soldiered on with new incarnations of Juan de la Cruz, sustaining sufficient interest towards the release of the band's first album, Up In Arms (1971), despite meeting only with moderate success. The timely arrivals of Pepe Smith and Mike Hanopol from their extended engagements in Japan, however, created a propitious situation for Gonzalez to create a power trio under a reinvigorated Juan de la Cruz identity. The reinvention resulted in the groundbreaking album and its title track, the Pinoy Rock anthem Himig Natin (trans. "Our Melody") (1973). Prior to their culminating partnership, Gonzalez, Hanopol and Smith have played together in varying combinations in earlier groups, such as the Downbeats, Jungle Cats, Zero History and Smith's "Japrock" excursion, Speed, Glue & Shinki (later joined by Hanopol). The innovative triumvirate's launch was heralded among Philippine music circles as the pioneering Pinoy rock initiative in the field of OPM. Their landmark trio album was followed by a more ambitious work, the album Maskara (1974), that featured a ballad composed and sung by Gonzalez, complemented by a full string orchestra.

== Later career ==
Gonzalez was dubbed as "the quiet Juan" because of his reticent and non-flamboyant demeanor. Parallel to the spinoff solo works released by his Juan de la Cruz Band colleagues, Wally Gonzalez released two solo albums of his own, Tunog Pinoy (trans. "Filipino Sound") (1977) and On the Road (1978). He broke through the charts with a guitar instrumental entitled "Wally's Blues", featured in his second solo album. As a fitting epilogue, Gonzalez returned to the recording studio for what became the final Juan de la Cruz album project, four years later since the band's prior release; with their most accessible albeit commercial work, Kahit Anong Mangyari (trans. "Whatever Happens") (1980).

In 1986, Wally Gonzalez retired as a musician and worked as a shipping company's treasurer for ten years, but decided on re-emerging sporadically starting in 1995. Onwards, Wally and Friends began the rounds of bars in Metro Manila, transforming into the Wally Gonzalez Bandwagon in 2002. His groups were a revolving door for emergent Pinoy Rock talent such as drummers Chris Messer, Vic Mercado, Bea Lao and Wendell Garcia; bassists Dondi Ledesma, Louie Talan and Norman Ferrer; keyboardist Wowie Posadas; vocalists Joonie Centeno and Kat Agarrado; and second guitarists such as Ted Nicholoff, King Pineda and Armand Quimpo.

== Discography ==
Artist	Album	Catalog	Label	Year	Personnel
Juan de la Cruz Band	Up In Arms	TSP-5054	Sunchine	1971	Wally Gonzalez (guitar), Rene Sogueco (keyboards), Clifford Ho (bass guitar), Bobot Guerrero (drums), Romy Santos (sax), Sandy Tagarro (vocals)
Juan de la Cruz Band	Himig Natin	TSP-5104	Sunshine	1973	Wally Gonzalez (guitar), Mike Hanopol (bass guitar, piano, vocals), Joey Smith (drums, vocals)
Juan de la Cruz Band	Maskara	TSP-5127	Sunshine	1974	Wally Gonzalez (guitar, vocals), Mike Hanopol (bass guitar, vocals), Joey Smith (drums, vocals)
Juan de la Cruz Band	Super Session	TSP-5152	Sunshine	1976	Wally Gonzalez (guitar), Mike Hanopol (bass guitar, vocals), Nides Aranza-Mendez (drums), Joey Smith (acoustic guitar, vocals)
Mike Hanopol	Buhay Musikero	JLP-105	JEM	1977	Mike Hanopol (bass guitar, piano, vocals), Wally Gonzalez (guitar), Edmond Fortuno (drums), Joey Smith (backing vocals)
Wally Gonzalez	Tunog Pinoy	BA-5009	Blackgold	1977	Wally Gonzalez (guitar, vocals), Boy de Jesus (bass guitar, vocals), Fernando Balagtas (drums, vocals), Danny Villaroza (keyboards)
Juan de la Cruz Band	Live & In Concert	TSP-5249	Sunshine	1978	Wally Gonzalez (guitar), Mike Hanopol (bass guitar, vocals), Joey Smith (drums, vocals)
Wally Gonzalez	Wally On The Road	BA-5024	Blackgold	1978	Wally Gonzalez (guitar, vocals), Boy de Jesus (bass guitar, vocals), Fernando Balagtas (drums, vocals)
Juan de la Cruz Band	Kahit Anonng Mangyari	BA-5064	Blackgold	1980	Wally Gonzalez (guitar), Mike Hanopol (bass guitar, guitar, vocals), Joey Smith (drums, vocals), Nick Boogie (drums) featuring Lorrie Ilustre, Homer Flores & Mike Hanopol (piano), Chito Ilagan & Danny Bornilla (bass guitar), Edmond Fortuno (drums)

== Juan Dela Cruz Band reunion ==
Spurred by a slew of bar gigs featuring Wally Gonzalez and Pepe Smith performing together as a duo in the early 2000s, the Juan de la Cruz Band were engaged for a reunion concert on June 11, 2005 at the Philippine World Trade Center in Pasay City.

== Death ==
Wally Gonzalez died in his sleep in the morning of July 23, 2021 in his home in Don Galo, Parañaque, Philippines from COVID-19 during the COVID-19 pandemic in the Philippines. Months earlier, in January 2021, Gonzalez had suffered a stroke that rendered him weak and unable to move. His son later confirmed that his father also tested positive for COVID-19 and had been fighting a blood infection.
