= List of storms named Hagibis =

The name Hagibis (Tagalog: hagibis, [hɐ.ɣɪ.ˈbɪs], ha-GHEE-bis) has been used for four tropical cyclones in the northwestern Pacific Ocean. The name was contributed by the Philippines and means "rapidity" or "swiftness" in Tagalog.

- Typhoon Hagibis (2002) (T0203, 05W) – Category 5 super typhoon that never affected land
- Typhoon Hagibis (2007) (T0724, 23W, Lando) – traversed the Philippines twice
- Tropical Storm Hagibis (2014) (T1407, 07W) – made landfall over southern China
- Typhoon Hagibis (2019) (T1919, 20W) – long-lived and violent Category 5 super typhoon that caused widespread destruction in Japan

The name Hagibis was retired following the 2019 Pacific typhoon season and was replaced with Ragasa (Tagalog: ragasa, [ɾɐɣɐ,ˈsaʔ], ra-GAH-sa), meaning "sudden acceleration" in Tagalog.

- Typhoon Ragasa (2025) (T2518, 24W, Nando) – a Category 5 super typhoon that caused devastation across the Batanes, Taiwan, and South China

The name Ragasa was retired following the 2025 Pacific typhoon season and a replacement name will be given at the 59th WMO/Typhoon Committee Annual Session in spring 2027.
