= Pepe Smith =

Filipino-American musical artist (1947–2019)

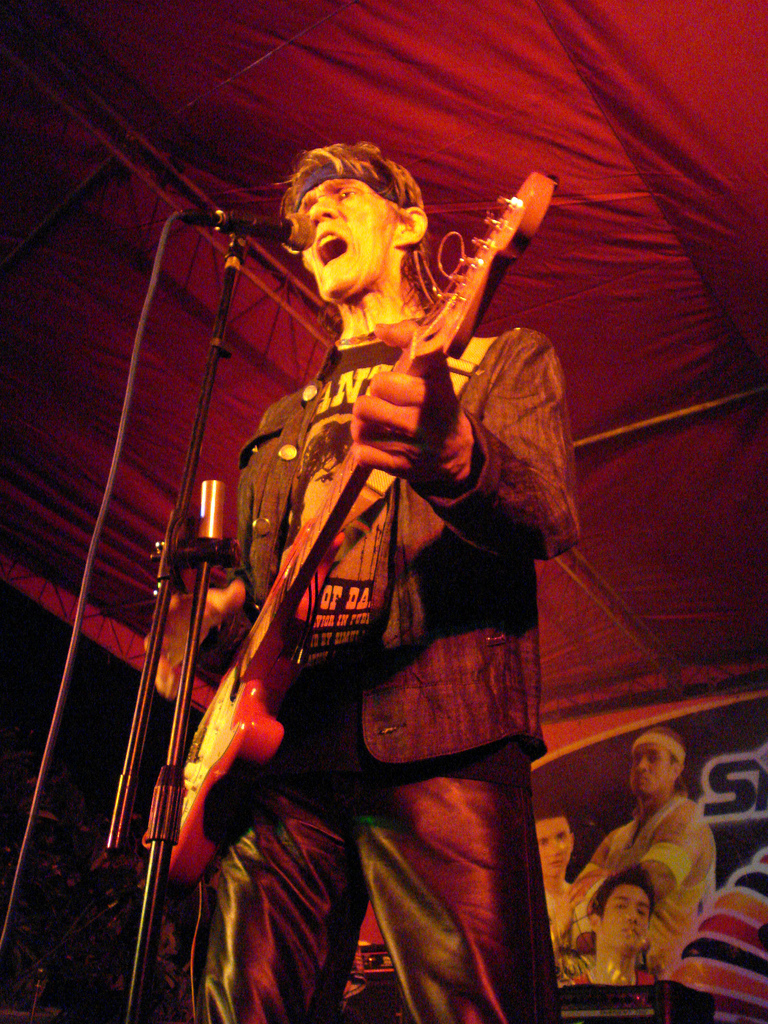
- Smith in 2008

Background information
- Also known as: Joey Smith; Pepe Smith
- Born: Joseph William Feliciano Smith; December 25, 1947; Angeles City, Pampanga, Philippines
- Died: January 28, 2019 (aged 71) Cainta, Rizal, Philippines
- Genre: Pinoy rock
- Occupations: Musician, songwriter, guitarist
- Instruments: Vocals, guitar, bass guitar, drums
- Years active: 1958–2019
- Formerly of: Speed, Glue & Shinki; Juan de la Cruz Band

Joseph William Feliciano Smith (December 25, 1947 – January 28, 2019) was a Filipino-American singer-songwriter, drummer and guitarist. Known by his stage names Joey Smith and Pepe Smith, he gained prominence as drummer / lead vocalist of Speed, Glue & Shinki from Japan, and drummer / co-lead vocalist of Juan de la Cruz Band from The Philippines, which became pioneering figures in original Filipino rock music or "Pinoy rock".

== Early life ==
Smith was born on December 25, 1947, to Edgar William Smith, a U.S. serviceman; and Conchita Feliciano, a native of Angeles, Pampanga where Clark Air Force base was then located.

When he was eight years old, his parents separated, and his mother died from hepatitis. Smith and his younger brother Raymond went to live with their grandmother, Concordia Go, in Kamuning, Quezon City.

== Early career ==
Smith learned to play the drums by about age 9, and formed his first rock band at age 11, in 1959. This group, composed of friends from the Kamuning district, was first called the Blue Jazzers, later the Villains, then the Surfers. As the Surfers, they got a 6-month gig in Vietnam in the early 1960s. A few years later, Smith became a rock sensation in Manila as the drummer and lead vocal of D’Downbeats band, imitating Mick Jagger of the Rolling Stones, which earned him the title "Mick Jagger of the Philippines".

The Downbeats, managed by the Reyes clan of Pasig, owners of RCR Productions, appeared in contemporary TV specials and movies. Eddie Reyes and The Downbeats opened for the Beatles at their concert of July 4, 1966, at the Rizal Memorial Stadium with Orlando Muñoz in Manila, performing "Get Off Of My Cloud", originally by the Rolling Stones. The Downbeats was the highest paid international band in Hong Kong during their time.

Smith formed an embryonic version of the seminal Pinoy rock group Juan de la Cruz Band in the Philippines in 1968. In 1969 along with Mike Hanopol and Wally Gonzalez (who had a close Japanese friend and contact living in Tokyo) sailed on President Lines to Japan and shortly after arriving formed Zero History. After impressing a Shinjuku nightclub owner who gave them a nightly live gig residency, the band also branched out to play nightclubs and shopping malls in the Tokyo metropolitan area. Zero History and Juan de la Cruz Band core members were Smith, with Wally Gonzalez (guitar) and Mike Hanopol (bass).

Pepe Smith was discovered by Shinki Chen (ex The Midnight Blues Band, The Bebes, Powerhouse, Foodbrain, & Shinki Chen & Friends) and Ikuzo Orita (Polydor Records Japan & Atlantic Records Japan) in 1970 and along with Masayoshi Kabe (ex The Golden Cups) was subsequently headhunted to join a new Japanese supergroup, which became known as Speed, Glue & Shinki. Smith played drums and sang for the Japanese rock trio. An interest in amphetamines was the attribution for his "Speed" moniker in the name of the band.

Subsequently, Wally Gonzalez sailed home to form the first version proper of Juan de la Cruz Band, which released their debut studio album “Up In Arms” in 1972. After releasing Speed, Glue & Shinki's debut studio album Eve in June 1971, bassist Masayoshi Kabe left the group to be replaced by Mike Hanopol. The new lineup released Speed, Glue & Shinki's final studio album in 1972. After a trip to England where he performed and hung out with members of Free (including the current Free & future Faces Japanese bassist Tetsu Yamauchi), Pepe Smith’s Japanese passport had expired. After renewing his passport in the Philippines en route to an outgoing flight back to Japan, Pepe was notified he wouldn’t be permitted to leave the country as a result of martial law in September 1972.

With Pepe Smith now a permanent resident of his home country again, he rejoined Juan de la Cruz Band in 1973 and the group downsized to a power trio playing once again with Wally Gonzalez and Mike Hanopol. Juan de la Cruz Band was signed to Orlando P. Muñoz Management. "Juan dela Cruz" is a Filipino term for "everyman" similar to "Joe Blow" in the USA. The band had some earlier lineups, but this trio came to be considered as the classic one. It became a quartet a few years later with the addition of Edmond "Bosyo" Fortuno from D’Swooners on drums, when Smith decided to play guitar instead.

Among their first gigs was the 1970 Antipolo Rock Music Festival, an open-field concert similar to Woodstock, attended by thousands. Juan de la Cruz Band arguably invented the Pinoy rock genre, focusing on original songwriting in Tagalog, instead of covers of foreign hit songs in English. It made superstars of all four members.

Smith composed Juan de la Cruz Band's arguably most classic song "Himig Natin" backstage in a ladies' toilet (he said the door to the men's toilet was busted) in 1972, while waiting for his turn to play in a concert called "Himig Natin" at the Rizal Park grounds in Manila.

Although "Himig Natin" and many other songs of the Juan de la Cruz Band have become rock anthems in the Philippines, none of the group members profited from the recordings. The rights to the whole catalog had been sold in perpetuity to Vicor Music from the very beginning of the band, a practice that might today be regarded as exploitative, but was apparently commonplace during the era. The band members were paid monthly stipends and other fees for live appearances and recording dates.

Smith and Fortuno were lifelong friends and frequent bandmates; in fact, Fortuno was Smith's drum teacher and mentor. Smith's other nickname was "Kalabog" from "Kalabog en Bosyo", the long-running Larry Alcala comic strip (1947–1995) about two dimwitted detectives, one tall, the other short, like Smith and Fortuno.

During a hiatus of Juan de la Cruz, Smith formed his own band, The Airwaves c. 1976. The members were Smith (vocals/dobro/drums), Jun Lopito (guitar), Gary Perez, formerly of Sampaguita (guitar), Gil Cruz (bass) and Edmond Fortuno (drums).

== Later career ==
On October 5, 1991, Smith was arrested in his home in Quezon City for illegal possession of methamphetamine (locally known as "shabu"). He was jailed for 19 months for alleged drug trafficking beginning in 1992. His constant jail visitor in the Quezon City Jail was Apa Ongpin, who, with Pepito Bosch and other friends, mounted a legal defense for him. He was eventually released for lack of evidence.

In 1994, he survived a car accident that damaged his jaw, and put him out of action for some months.

Smith released his first solo album, Idiosyncrasies, on Alpha Records in 2005. The 14-track album was three-years in the making; the recording project had started in 2002. The album was released simultaneously with the Juan dela Cruz three-CD collection from rival Vicor Music. In the late 2000s, Smith played a comedic role on an ABS-CBN sitcom entitled The Smiths, a funky reality show about his unconventional family and starring himself and three of his five children.

Journalist Howie Severino produced and directed a documentary on Smith's life titled, Pepe's Myth. It aired on GMA Network on April 24, 2006. The raw footage consisted of several days of interviews with Smith, his friends and family, and included a poignant concert at the Quezon City Jail, organized by Severino, 12 years after Smith's release from the facility.

Smith played as one of the two main characters in the 2014 movie, Above the Clouds, directed by Pepe Diokno, the movie also uses some of his songs.

== Reunion concert ==
During the first Juan de la Cruz reunion concert in 1998, the band members appeared one by one on stage, adding one instrument at a time, building to a dramatic crescendo accompanied by fog and light effects.

== Awards ==
Year	Award giving body	Category	Nominated work	Results
1994	NU Rock Awards	Rock Legend Award	—N/a	Won

== Personal life ==
Smith had been associated with several women over the course of his life, and had five children. It has been rumored that his eldest, Queenie, born 1976, also a rock singer, is the daughter of noted artist Agnes Arellano. But Arellano categorically denies this: "Joey and I never had a child; I am not the mother of Queenie. The only issue that came out of our short wedded life was the song "Himig Natin". I didn't help him write it but we were together when he did." Queenie is followed by former MYX VJ Sanya Smith, born 1985, Beebop, born 1989, Desiderata (Daisy), born 1991, and Delta, born 1992. The last three children were born from Smith's wife Rosuela Cruz.

== Death ==
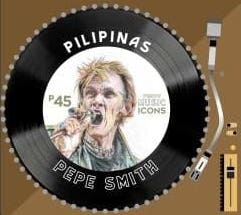
Pepe Smith on a 2019 stamp of the Philippines in the series "Pinoy Music Icons"

He had suffered his third stroke in 2017, with the first leaving him with a speech impediment. Smith died on January 28, 2019, at the Arnaiz Hospital at age 71, after being rushed to the hospital after he complained of chest pain while practicing playing the guitar that day in Cainta, Rizal. He died of cardiac arrest. Smith was laid to rest at the Loyola Memorial Park in Parañaque.

== Discography ==
=== Speed, Glue & Shinki ===
- 1971: Eve
- 1972: Speed, Glue & Shinki

=== Juan de la Cruz Band albums with Joey "Pepe" Smith ===
- 1973: Himig Natin (translation: "Our Music" _{{Hymn}})
- 1974: Maskara (trans.: "Mask")
- 1975: Super Session
- 1981: Kahit Anong Mangyari (trans.: "Whatever Happens")

=== Solo Album ===
- 2005: Idiosyncrasies

== Sources ==
- Pepe Smith biography
