= Tokyo – New York =

Studio album by Vodka Collins
- Released: (Japan) 5 November 1973
- Recorded: 19 March to 3 September 1973
- Genre: Glam rock
- Length: 28:42
- Label: Express Records
- Producer: Masatoshi Hashiba

Vodka Collins chronology
| Tokyo – New York (1973) | Chemical Reaction (1996) |

Professional ratings
Review scores
| Source | Rating |
|---|---|
| AllMusic | 4/5 stars |

Tokyo – New York by the band Vodka Collins is an LP on the Toshiba EMI Express label, recorded 19 March to 3 September 1973, and released 5 November 1973. It was produced by Masatoshi Hashiba.

The album yielded singles "Sands of Time" and "Automatic Pilot". Tokyo – New York has been re-issued several times.

== Track listing ==
A-side

1. Automatic Pilot
2. Billy Mars
3. Terminal City
4. Sands of Time
5. Pontiac Pan

B-side

1. Diamond to Dungarees
2. Monitor
3. Vacuum Girl
4. Scratchin'
