= Asin (band) =

Filipino folk rock band

ASIN
- Also known as: Salt of the Earth; Asin ng Lupa
- Origin: Manila, Philippines
- Genres: Folk rock; Manila sound
- Years active: 1976–1980; 1983–1985; 1988–1990; 1992–present
- Labels: Vicor; Ivory
- Members: Mike Pillora Jr.; Lolita Carbon
- Past members: Cesar Bañares Jr. (deceased); Pendong Aban Jr.
- Website: www.asinpilipinas.com

Asin (sometimes stylized as ASIN) are a Pinoy folk rock band from the Philippines. They started as a trio in the late 1970s before becoming a quartet, and were originally known as the Salt of the Earth. Their name asín means salt in the Filipino language.

== History ==
=== Formation and early success ===
ASIN was formed in late 1976, the nucleus of which was the duo of Mike Pillora Jr. of Negros Occidental and Cesar Bañares Jr. of South Cotabato, who were playing at folk joints and pub houses in Manila as 'Mike and Cesar'. A year later, Lolita Carbon was recruited by the duo to fill in the missing middle voice and eventually became the third member. Pillora named the trio 'Salt of the Earth', after the song recorded originally by The Rolling Stones, later by Joan Baez, written and composed by Mick Jagger and Keith Richards. Other than that song's title, Pillora also meant for the name to reference the Biblical metaphor "salt of the earth", which represents the humble and sincere masses.

In 1978, the trio (who were all songwriters, composers and arrangers) signed their first recording contract and localized their name "Salt of the Earth" into its Tagalog equivalent, "Asin ng Lupa", ultimately shortened to ASIN. The members also adopted handles (sobriquets) based on local-style nicknames, becoming known to their fans as "Nonoy" (Pillora), "Saro" (Bañares), and "Nene" (Carbon).

In the same year, their eponymous debut LP Asin was released, giving birth to an alternative form of music that was different and distinct from what was mainstream. Their songs conveyed a message that roused a social consciousness among the vast majority of Filipinos, becoming a rallying call for social and political aspirations.

In the last quarter of 1979, they launched another album titled Himig ng Pag-ibig (Hymn of Love). The group's breakup abruptly followed. However, their absence from the music scene did not hamper their growing popularity.

The group was not heard from until 1983. In the summer of that year, AIESEC (Association Internationale des Etudiants en Sciences Economiques et Commerciales), an international students’ business organization the Philippine headquarters of which was based in Cebu, made a project to reunite the group. Nonoy was summoned and was tasked with reuniting his band. This resulted in a jam-packed reunion concert of the group at the Cebu Coliseum, Cebu City. From then on, ASIN, with their manager Dindo, rolled into a series of performances in Mindanao, sporadic shows in the Visayas, and marathon concerts in Luzon.

This culminated in the creation and launch of their third album, Himig ng Lahi (Hymn of the Race) in the same year. Through Nonoy, Fred Aban Jr., the session bass player known by the name "Pendong", was adopted by the trio and became the group's fourth member although he had not previously been a songwriter ("Mga Limot na Bayani", "Siglo", "Pag-asa", among others, were later written by Aban for the group). Since each male member was a "junior" carrying his father's first name, Nene (Carbon) also proclaimed herself a "junior".

In early 1984, the group released an experimental album titled Ang mga Awitin ng Bayan kong Pilipinas, an adaptation of traditional and contemporary songs from various regions of the Philippines.

In November 1985, they released another original compilation that Nonoy titled ASIN...Sa Atubiling Panahon (Asin...In A Doubtful Time). This unfolded through the series of events early the following year, among which was the EDSA Revolution that toppled the ruling Marcos regime in February. ASIN called the period "atubilíng panahón" (doubtful time), during which the group disbanded for a second time.

In 1988, they decided to regroup once again, hoping to create new material for another album speaking of the new decade. Instead, they were urged by their new manager to make an adaptation of outdated songs, resulting in the duology album Himig Kayumanggi and Sinta.

Later on, various intrigues led to the expulsion of Nonoy, who was disgruntled and decided to travel through Thailand, Sri Lanka, India, Greece, Israel and Egypt to "look for his soul". Back home, the dream of making a new album was not fulfilled, with Saro and Nene, still performing under the name ASIN, joining the band Lokal Brown.

In 1990, the remaining members (who were in a clique headed by their new manager) disbanded. Saro returned to his home province of South Cotabato, while Nene formed her eponymous band, and Pendong formed Grupong Pendong.

In 1992, a concert promoter gathered the three original members, Nonoy, Saro and Nene for a reunion concert, clarifying that Pendong was not included due to scheduling issues. The concert was staged at the Folk Arts Theater, but it was merely a one-night event, after which the members again went their separate ways.

=== Death of Bañares ===
At around 9:00 p.m. on March 18, 1993, Cesar "Saro" Bañares Jr. was at a karaoke bar in his hometown of Koronadal when a brawl erupted among several customers. A single gunshot was fired, which hit Bañares in the forehead. He was brought to a hospital but eventually died.

After a seven-year trial, lawyer Gualberto Cataluña Jr. and brothers Joelito and Joel Castracion were found guilty of the murder of Bañares. The three were sentenced to life imprisonment, and ordered to pay Bañares' family more than ₱1 million in damages. According to the prosecution's witnesses, Cataluña and the Castracion brothers assaulted Bañares over a misunderstanding, with Cataluña allegedly starting the fight by throwing a beer bottle at Bañares' forehead. While the Castracion brothers were assaulting Bañares, Cataluña passed a handgun to Joelito Castracion who then shot Bañares. The three served their sentences at New Bilibid Prison in Muntinlupa. On June 1, 2007, Cataluña was released after a successful appeal that changed his charge from murder to homicide. The court considered his sentence served after he had spent spending seven years in detention and another seven incarcerated. Cataluña later resumed his law practice.

=== Later years ===
Between the late 1990s and early 2000s, Nene, who carried the Asin name among her fans in Cagayan, frequented her friend Willi Catral who arranged for some performances. Her frequent visits to Tuguegarao helped her establish contacts with environmental groups like the Sierra Madre Outdoor Club.

In 2000, a British expatriate named Craig Burrows, MBE conceptualised a reunion album for the three surviving members of the band. He first spoke with Nonoy, who eagerly agreed, and later brought Nene and Pendong to Nonoy's island residence. The three had a few meetings wherein Nonoy came up with the concept for the album, which the two eagerly accepted. The album was not released, and Nonoy’s concept was never realized. In 2002, with the support of Burrows, Nene and Pendong made their own album Pag-ibig, Pagbabago, Pagpapatuloy. Later, Pendong told the media how Nonoy finally decided to leave the spotlight and settle into a more peaceful life, the band's beginnings, and how together with Nonoy and Saro he had met Nene at the folk rock club Kola House, and decided to form their own musical group, naming it 'Salt of the Earth'.

Nonoy continued to perform with a new partner named Ginji as Noyginji Interaktiv. They distributed CDs with new compositions, such as "...Ang Karugtong" (...The Continuation).

In the middle of 2006, Nene and Pendong parted ways, the latter emigrating with his family to the United States, where he continued playing as Grupong Pendong. In the last quarter of that same year, Nonoy and his family emigrated to Israel and continued to perform as Noyginji Interaktiv. Nene stayed in the Philippines and played as a soloist.

On July 14, 2010, Nonoy and Nene reunited as ASIN to pay tribute to Cesar "Saro" Bañares Jr. in his hometown of Koronadal, South Cotabato. Their performance opened the 44th T’nalak Festival, a yearly celebration showcasing the dances and crafts of the tribal communities as well as the produce of South Cotabato. The following day, they were invited by Manny Pacquiao to play before a large crowd in his home province of Sarangani. On the third day, they casually played for invited guests of the mayor of Lake Sebu in Surallah, South Cotabato.

ASIN were presented a MYX Magna Award at the MYX Music Awards 2021, held virtually on August 6, 2020 during the COVID-19 pandemic. The award recognizes their contributions to the OPM industry.

== Artistry ==
Asin was the first group to incorporate Filipino indigenous instruments into Filipino pop/rock music. They also studied Filipino tribal music and did what they could to be true to its origins. Instead of plagiarizing Indigenous music, they set about educating the wider public about respecting the origins of the music and representing it with agreement from various indigenous people groups.

Although Asin admittedly did not set out to be a political band, their songs which have themes of loneliness and longing, reflected the tumultuous undercurrent of the 1970s in the Philippines under President Ferdinand Marcos. The band's relation with the Marcos government is conflicted and ambivalent: the government sometimes deemed their recordings subversive and confiscated these, and at other times called the band’s music patriotic. Nevertheless, Asin's songs like "Balita", "Bayan Kong Sinilangan (Cotabato)", "Magnanakaw", "Gising na Kaibigan", "Mga Limot na Bayani", among others, have become favourites particularly among activists and ordinary people critical of the dictatorship.

== Legacy ==
A number of their songs have been extensively sampled and interpolated by other Filipino artists. The Tagalog-language hook from The Black Eyed Peas' "The Apl Song" is based on "Balita", whose original lyrics reflect the horrors of the Moro conflict in Mindanao; "The Apl Song" is a brief autobiographical account of Black Eyed Peas member apl.de.ap, who was born in Angeles City to an African-American serviceman who left him shortly after his birth. He chose the song as he grew up listening to Asin. His next song from the album Monkey Business entitled "Bebot" also sampled the guitar riff from "Ang Bayan Kong Sinilangan (Cotabato)".

"Balita" is also sampled on the sixth track of Gloc-9's 2009 album Matrikula, which features Gabby Alipe of Urbandub.

The song "Masdan Mo ang Kapaligiran" was dedicated to Pasig River. It was used as the closing credits for the 1993 film Engkanto, starring Janice de Belen, Roderick Paulate, Vilma Santos and rapper Francis Magalona and released by OctoArts Films.

In 2010, Yeng Constantino covered "Himig Ng Pag-Ibig" as the theme for the ABS-CBN teleserye Dyosa, arranged by Paolo Zarate. The original version was sampled by hip hop artist Pio, featuring Lolita Carbon, and released by Viva Records in 2012. The song was also covered by actress Glaiza de Castro for the Cinemalaya film Liway (2018). This has also been a cover soundtrack for the film Adan, starring Cindy Miranda and Rhen Escaño. The 2021 film Whether the Weather Is Fine used the song in a climactic sequence.

== Members ==
=== Current ===
- Mike "Nonoy" Pillora Jr. (1976–present)
- Lolita "Nene" Carbon (1978–present)

=== Former members ===
- Cesar "Saro" Bañares Jr. (1976–93; died in 1993)
- Fred "Pendong" Aban Jr. (1983–1990; 2002–2006)

Note: There are only 4 official members of ASIN, all other backup players are session musicians.

=== Touring and session members ===
- Henry "Douggy" Jamisola (1976–1978) – drummer
- Benjamin "Ben" Abcede (1983–1987) – session drummer

== Discography ==
=== Albums ===
- Asin (Vicor Music, 1978)
- Himig ng Pag-ibig (Vicor Music, 1979)
- Himig ng Lahi (Ivory Music, 1983)
- Ang Mga Awitin ng Bayan Kong Pilipinas (Ivory Music, 1984)
- Asin sa Atubiling Panahon (Ivory Music, 1986)
- Himig Kayumanggi (Vicor Music, 1987)
- Sinta (Vicor Music, 1988)
- Pag-ibig, Pagbabago, Pagpapatuloy (Vicor Music, 2001)

=== Compilation albums ===
- Mga Ginintuang Awitin ng Asin (Vicor Music, 1983)
- Masdan Mo ang Kapaligiran (Vicor Music, 1994)
- Ang Bayan Kong Sinilangan: Paglalakbay sa mga Awitin ng Asin (Vicor Music 40th Anniversary) (Vicor Music, 2005)
- 18 Greatest Hits (Vicor Music, 2009)

=== Singles ===
- "Masdan Mo Ang Kapaligiran" (Vicor Music, 1978)
- "Pagbabalik" (Vicor Music, 1978)
- "Ang Bayan Kong Sinilangan" (Vicor Music, 1978)
- "Itanong Mo Sa Mga Bata" (Vicor Music, 1979)
- "Ang Buhay Ko" (Vicor Music, 1979)
- "Himig ng Pag-ibig" (Vicor Music, 1979) (Re-recorded by original Asin lead singer Lolita Carbon Feat. hip hop artist Pio in 2012)
- "Balita" (Vicor Music, 1979) (sampled by Black Eyed Peas as "The Apl Song" in 2005)
- "Gising Kaibigan" (Vicor Music, 1979)
- "Usok" (Vicor Music, 1979)
- "Lupa" (Vicor Music, 1984) (Original by the late Rico J. Puno)

=== Album appearances ===
- Ugat: The Best Of OPM Folk Rock Vol. 1 (Vicor Music, 2008)
- Ugat: The Best Of OPM Folk Rock Vol. 2 (Vicor Music, 2010)

== Awards ==
- Best Folksong of the Year for "Orasyon" – AWIT Awards 1984
- Best Album of the Year for Himig ng Lahi – AWIT Awards 1984
- Album of the Year for Himig ng Lahi – Jingle Magazine Awards 1984
- Best Vocal Arrangement for Group in "Lupa" – Cecil Awards 1986
- Department of Environment and Natural Resources Likas Yaman Award for Masdan Mo and Kapaligiran 1991
- For Lolita Carbon – Best Rock Recording for "Paraisong Liku-liko", AWIT Awards 1990
- For Pendong Aban, Jr. – Best World Music Album for Ang Grupong Pendong – Dito Sa Lupa
- Album – Katha Music Awards 1995
- Best Folksong for "Pagbabalik" – Aliw Awards 1979
- Nominated as Best Rock Recording for "Usok" in the 1st Cecil Awards
- Best Musical Arrangement for Dalawang Dekada ng Asin (Overture), AWIT Awards 2002
- Environmental Champions 2004 – DENR/WORLD BANK Publication – Environmental Monitor 2004, given June 20, 2005
- Winner, MYX Magna Award, MYX Music Awards 2021

== See also ==
- Juan de la Cruz Band
- Mike Hanopol
- Pinoy rock
- Sampaguita
- Protest music against the Marcos dictatorship
