= The Spiders (Japanese band) =

Japanese rock band

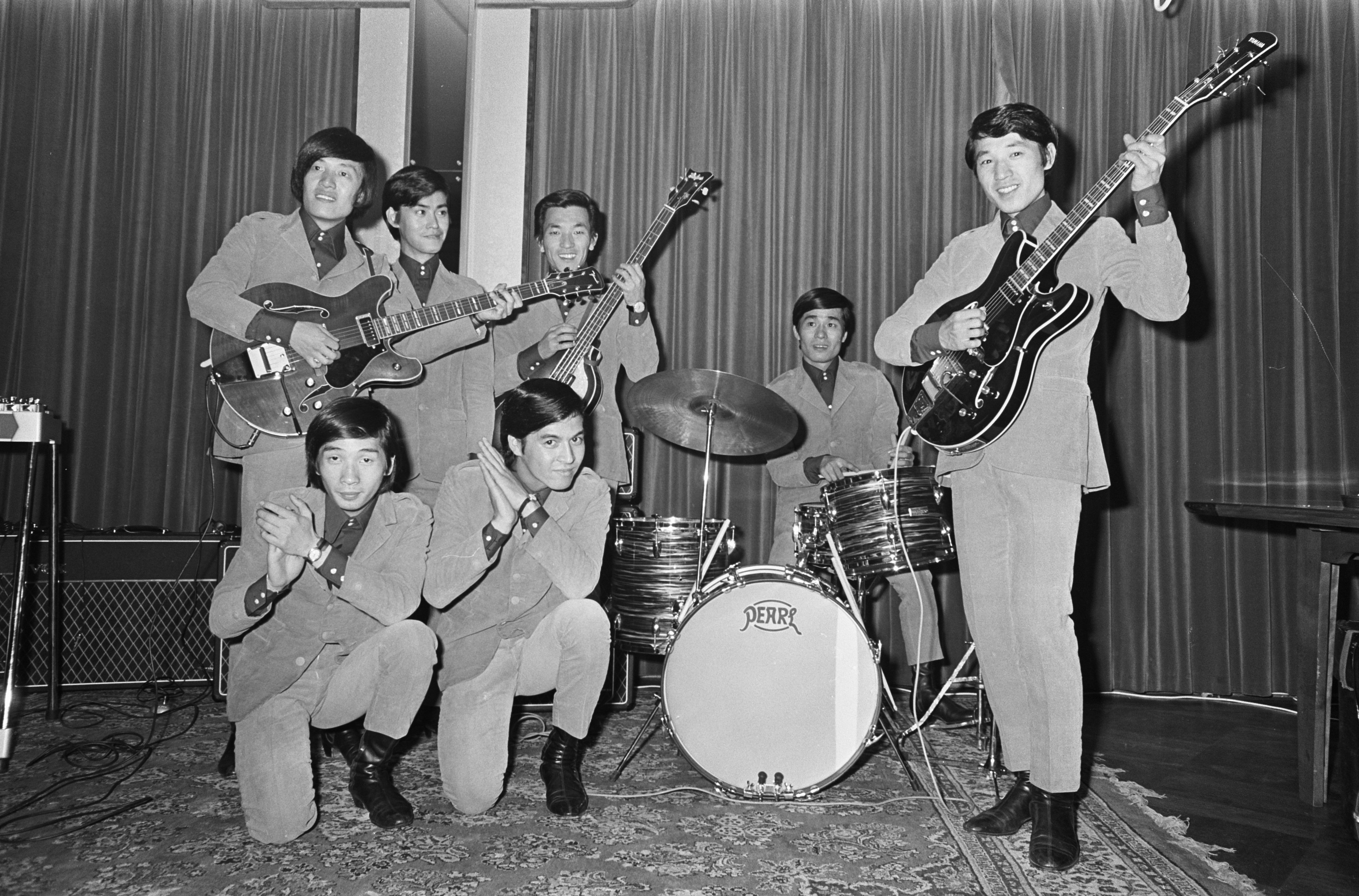
- The Spiders during their 1966 visit to the Netherlands

Background information
- Also known as: ザ・スパイダース
- Origin: Tokyo, Japan
- Genres: Group Sounds; beat; garage rock
- Years active: 1961–1970
- Label: Philips
- Past members: Masaaki Sakai; Jun Inoue; Hiroshi Kamayatsu (deceased); Takayuki Inoue; Katsuo Ōno; Mitsuru Kato; Shochi Tanabe

The Spiders were a Japanese rock band formed in Tokyo in 1961, as one of the leading groups of the Group Sounds genre.

== History ==
Band members were Hiroshi "Monsieur" Kamayatsu (rhythm guitar and backing singer), Jun Inoue (singer), Masaaki Sakai (tambourine and backing singer), Shochi Tanabe (drums), Takayuki Inoue (lead guitar and backing singer), Mitsuru Kato (bass guitar) and Katsuo Ōno (electronic organ and steel guitar). They had many hit singles, made feature films and were popular in the late 1960s and early 1970s in Japan. They toured Europe in 1966, and the United States, including Hawaii, in 1967. Most of the band members are still active in the music industry, with the exception of Monsieur, who died on 1 March 2017 and Takayuki Inoue, who died on 2 May 2018.

Their biggest selling record was "Yuhiganaiteiru" which sold over 1.2 million copies, and was awarded a gold disc.

== Selected discography ==
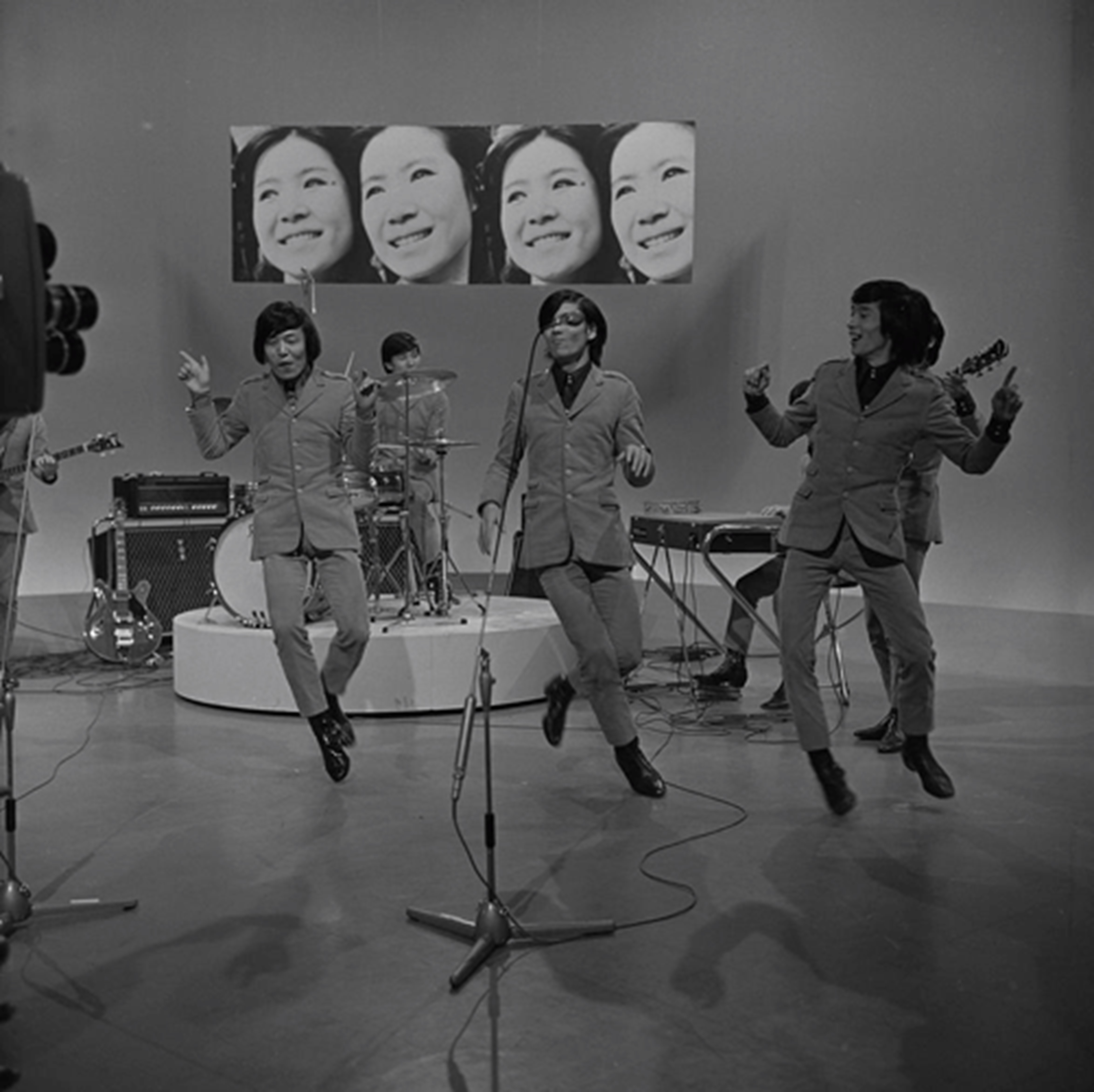
The Spiders (1966)

=== Albums ===
- Album No. 1 (Rel. 15 April 1966)
- Album No. 2 (Rel. 1 June 1966)
- Album No. 3 (Rel. 1 February 1967)
- The Spiders Meets The Savage (Rel. March 1967)
- Album No. 4 (Rel. 5 September 1967)
- Album No. 5 (Rel. 15 March 1968)
- Meiji Hyakunen Spiders Nana Nen (Rel. 25 October 1968)
- The Spiders '69 (Rel. 25 May 1969)
- Rock 'N' Roll Renaissance (Rel. 25 May 1970)

=== Singles ===
- Furi Furi b/w Monkey Dance (Crown CW-291 - Rel. 10 May 1965)
- Etenraku Go, Go b/w Twilight Zone (Victor SS-1597 - Rel. 15 November 1965)
- No No Boy b/w Little Robby (Philips SFL-1034 - Rel. 1 February 1966)
- Seishun a Go Go b/w Kurai Ando Kurai (Crown CW-444 - Rel. 10 March 1966)
- Hey Boy b/w Michelle (Philips SFL-1043 - Rel. 15 April 1966)
- Summer Girl b/w Up-Side-Down (Philips SFL-1057 - Rel. 1 July 1966)
- Yuhiganaiteiru b/w Chibi No Julie (Philips FS-1003 - Rel. 15 September 1966)
- Nantonaku Nantonaku b/w Boom Boom (Philips FS-1007 - Rel. 25 December 1966)
- Taiyo No Tsubasa b/w Sora No Hiroba (Philips FS-1013 - Rel. 1 March 1967)
- Balla Balla b/w Land Of 1,000 Dances (Philips FS-1014 - Rel. 20 April 1967)
- Kazeganaiteiru b/w Kimi Ni Ageyou (Philips FS-1020 - Rel. 15 July 1967)
- Ano Niji Wo Tsukamo b/w Koi No Doctor (Philips FS-1022 - Rel. 25 August 1967)
- Itsumademo Dokomademo b/w Ban Ban Ban (Philips FS-1030 - Rel. 25 October 1967)
- Anotoki Kimi Wa Wakakatta b/w Mo Ichido Mo Ichido (Philips FS-1040 - Rel. 5 March 1968)
- Shinjyu No Namida b/w Akai Dress No Onna No Ko (Philips FS-1050 - Rel. 5 June 1968)
- Kuroyuri No Uta b/w Rock And Roll Boy (Philips FS-1060 - Rel. 5 September 1968)
- Glass No Seijo b/w Kaze Wa Liyatsu (Philips FS-1065 - Rel. 25 November 1968)

== Films ==
- Friends (1964, Nikkatsu) Director: Nozomu Yanase
- Highland Lady (1965, Nikkatsu) Director: Nozomu Yanase
- Youth A Go-Go (1966, Nikkatsu) Director: Kenjiro Morinaga
- Goodbye Mr. Tear (1966, Nikkatsu) Director: Shōgorō Nishimura
- You Are A Lover (1967, Nikkatsu) Director: Buichi Saitō
- Kigeki ekimae hyakku-nen (1967, Toho) Director: Shirō Toyoda
- The Sunset Is Crying (1967, Nikkatsu) Director: Kenjiro Morinaga
- Wild Scheme A Go Go (1967, Nikkatsu) Director: Buichi Saitō
- Go Forward! (1968, Nikkatsu) Director: Kō Nakahira
- Big Commotion! (1968, Nikkatsu) Director: Kenjiro Morinaga
- Road To Bali (1968, Nikkatsu) Director: Katsumi Nishikawa
- The Wonderful Ones (1968, Shochiku) Director: Kōichi Saitō
- Nippon oyafukō jidai (1968, Toho) Director: Kunihiko Yamamoto
