= Masayoshi Kabe =

Japanese guitarist (1949–2020)

Masayoshi Kabe (加部 正義, Kabe Masayoshi) (5 November 1948 – 26 September 2020) often known by his stage names Louis or Louise Louis, was a Japanese bassist and guitarist from Yokohama, Japan. Numerous online sources present him as half-French and half-Japanese, but this was actually a marketing creation from the producers of the Golden Cups; Kabe was half-American and half-Japanese. He began his career in 1966 as a member of The Golden Cups. He was a studio musician throughout the 1970s and also a member of various bands such as Speed, Glue & Shinki until he joined the group Johnny, Louis & Char (later renamed Pink Cloud) in 1978. After they disbanded in 1994 he formed the instrumental side-project ZokuZokuKazoku (ZZK) while providing support to other musicians as a bassist. He also recorded three albums as bass player for a reunion version of the 1970s band Vodka Collins from 1995 to 1998. He died on 26 September 2020, of multiple organ failure.
