= The Golden Cups =

Japanese pop/rock band

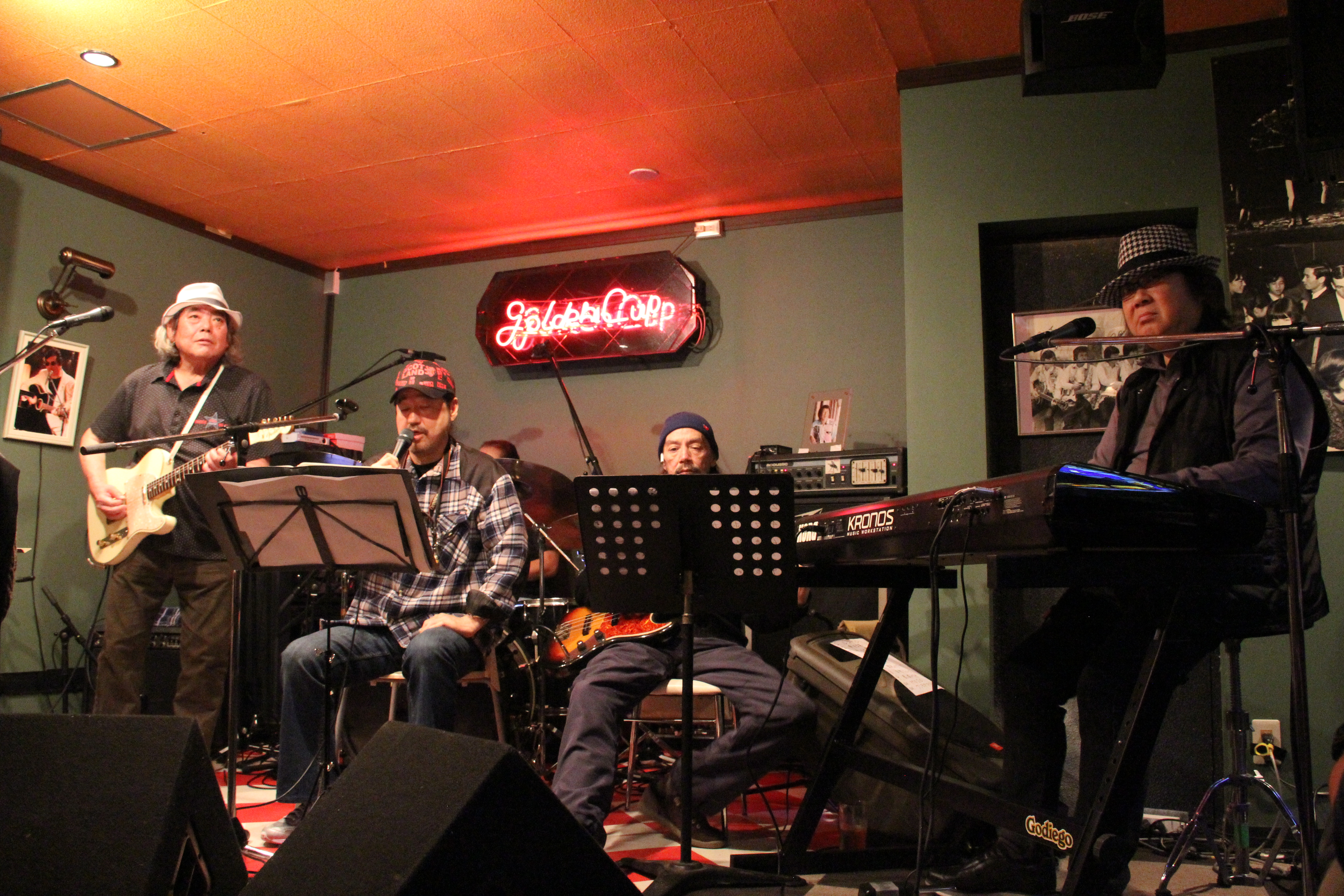
- The Golden Cups, 2013

Background information
- Also known as: Group & I
- Origin: Yokohama, Japan
- Genres: Pop, garage rock, blues rock
- Years active: 1966–1971; 2003–present
- Past members: Tokimune "Dave" Hirao; Masayoshi "Louis" Kabe; Eddie Ban; Kenneth Ito; Mamoru Manu; Mickie Yoshino; George Yanagi; Ai Takano; Keibun Lin; John Yamazaki
- Website: http://www.goldencups.com/

The Golden Cups (ザ・ゴールデン・カップス, Za Gōruden Kappusu) are a Japanese pop and rock band, who were one of the top bands performing in the Group Sounds scene in the late 1960s.

== Career ==
The band formed in November 1966 in Yokohama, and initially comprised locally born singer Tokimune "Dave" Hirao (November 17, 1944 – November 10, 2008), guitarist Guang-yuan "Eddie" Ban (June 22, 1947 - May 10, 2025), Hawaiian-born guitarist Kenneth Ito (January 1, 1946 – March 2, 1997), bassist Masayoshi "Louis" Kabe (November 5, 1948 – September 26, 2020), and drummer Mamoru Manu (June 3, 1949 – September 2020).

Hirao had previously sung in local band The Sphinx, and had recently traveled to the US, as had Ban who returned to Japan with one of the first fuzzboxes in the country. The new band initially called themselves Group & I, and were influenced by the rock and roll music broadcast on the Far East Network from the local US Army base at Honmoku, and more generally by contacts made with Americans and others in the port city of Yokohama.

They began playing sets consisting of covers of American pop and rock hits such as "Hey Joe", "Got My Mojo Workin'" and "I Feel Good". They became the house band at the Golden Cup discotheque close to the US Army base, and the club's owner persuaded them to change their name to the Golden Cups. The band also soon won a regular place on the NHK-TV morning show, Young 720, and a recording deal with the Capitol label owned by Toshiba. In June 1967, they released their first single, "Itoshi No Jizabel" / "Hiwa Mata Noboru". The record label compelled the group to record bland pop songs written by staff songwriters for most of their A-sides, only allowing them free rein on the records' B-sides and some album tracks. The same approach was imposed on their performances, with the band obliged to play pop ballads at their major concerts, while playing eccentric garage band covers and hard rock when appearing in small clubs. They released their first album, The Golden Cups Album, in March 1968, and had their biggest pop hit, "Nagai Kami No Shoujo" ("Girl With Long Hair") soon afterwards.

Kenneth Ito traveled to Hawaii in mid-1968, and was not allowed a visa to return to Japan. He was replaced by keyboard player Mickey Yoshino, in time to record the band's second album The Golden Cups Album Vol. 2. This again featured covers of American pop hits like "Woman, Woman" alongside more adventurous numbers, producing what Julian Cope has called "a schizophrenic stalemate". Their next album was a live recording, Blues Message, on which the band performed versions of three of the tracks on the Paul Butterfield Blues Band's album East-West.

In 1969, Eddie Ban left the group to form his own band, and Louis Kabe took over on guitar. Later albums included Super Live Session, heavily influenced by the album Super Session by Al Kooper and Mike Bloomfield; Recital, which featured orchestral versions of some of the group's hits; and Live Album with the Golden Cups, described by Julian Cope as "abominable". During this period the band underwent many personnel changes, with only Hirao and Kabe remaining constant. On New Year's Eve 1971/72, the band were playing in a club in Okinawa when the building caught fire and burned to the ground, taking all of the band's equipment and possessions with it. Although the group members were unharmed, they split up immediately afterwards.

== Aftermath ==
Louis Kabe later played bass in the psychedelic blues rock group Speed, Glue & Shinki, and was then a member of rock bands Pink Cloud and Vodka Collins. Eddie Ban returned to running his parents' Chinese restaurant in Yokohama. In 2003, most of the band's original members reunited for a concert in Yokohama and released as a live album. A full-length documentary about the band, The Golden Cups One More Time, was released in late 2004 and was followed by further concerts.

Kenneth Ito died in 1997. Dave Hirao died as a result of oesophageal cancer in 2008 at the age of 63. Kabe died in 2020 at the age of 71. Manu also died in 2020 at the age of 71.
