= Mike Hanopol =

Filipino musician and Messianic religious leader of Russian-Jewish descent (born 1946)

- Also known as: Mike Hanopol
- Born: Michael Abarico Hanopol; April 10, 1946 (age 80); Leyte, Philippines
- Genres: Pinoy rock, hard rock, rock and roll
- Occupations: Musician, songwriter,
- Instruments: Vocals, guitar, bass
- Years active: 1960s–present
- Labels: Vicor Music; Star Music (music rights)

Michael Abarico Hanopol (born April 10, 1946), also known as Mike Hanopol, is a Filipino rock singer, guitarist, recording artist and Messianic religious leader. He was a former bass guitarist for the Juan de la Cruz Band. He is a pioneer of rock music in the Philippines active in the 1970s, along with Pepe Smith and Wally Gonzales.

During his career as a musician, Hanopol produced twenty albums, three of which became Gold prize awardees while another three received the Aliw Awards. Hanopol's trademark is the beret, leather clothing, and his Steinberger guitar. He was the mentor and songwriter for Hagibis.

== Influences ==
Despite being a rock-and-roll figure, Hanopol's experience in the seminary influenced him to compose song lyrics based on Bible passages. Examples are the first two stanzas for Hanopol's song "Balong Malalim" ("Deep Well") which were based on the Book of John, and the "Laki sa Layaw" song that conveys the biblical message of avoiding arrogance. "Laki sa Layaw", also known as "Laki sa Layaw Jeproks", is Hanopol's trademark and favorite song. Some of the songs in Hanopol's latest album Lagablab, under Warner Music Philippines, were based on the Book of Psalms (Psalm 75:3–16 and Psalm 37:1–6) and the Ten Commandments. Hanopol's Lagablab is a "10-track guitar album" that features "inspiring and original compositions" aimed at imparting life's lessons to the younger generation of Filipinos. Lagablab is an assortment of jazz, rock, hip-hop, fusion, and ballad music. The rap song in the album was performed with Filipino rapper Francis Magalona.

== Life in the U.S. ==
Hanopol left the Philippines in 1982 to live in the North Miami beach area of South Florida, United States. His album Pilyong Bata was produced in Fort Lauderdale, Florida. Hanopol relocated to New York City in 1983. After playing music with Filipino and American bands in New York, Hanopol went back to the North Miami beach area in 1987. He returned to the Philippines in 1993.

It was said in an interview, he saw a very great guitarist performing and he was so impressed that he told the guitarist that he wanted some lessons with him. That guitarist turned out to be Joe Satriani.

== Present status ==
A legendary rock artist recognized in Asia and the Western world, Hanopol is a "frequent show-opener" for concerts such as Asian performances by Western rock artists Pink Floyd and Led Zeppelin. Hanopol was the founder of the Asian pop band known as Tribu Kemistri, a group of musicians which play rock, ethnic rhythms, and new age music. On June 11, 2005, Hanopol and the Juan de la Cruz Band held a reunion concert at the World Trade Center in Pasay.

In July 2018, Hanopol released his latest album Mike Hanopology: Ang Sekreto recorded in 1993 on a 12-track analog recorder by Butch Dans with members of the Ugoy-Ugoy Band, including George San Jose on drums, Meong Pacana, bass, Bond Samson, keyboards and Noel Santiago, second guitar.

== Personal life ==
Hanopol married Herminia in 1973 and they have a daughter named Michelle, nicknamed "Yummy". He is a practicing Messianic religious leader, having converted to Messianic Judaism upon learning about his Russian-Jewish heritage in New York.

Mike Hanopol was diagnosed with COVID-19 on June 10, 2021.

== Discography ==
=== Songs ===
- "Katawan"
- "No Touch"
- "Laki sa Layaw Jeproks"
- "Buhay Musikero"
- "Awiting Pilipino"
- "Ichon"
- "Tulungan Natin"
- "Tribu Kemistri"
- "Mr. Kenkoy"
- "Balong Malalim"
- "Titsers Enemi No.1"
- "Lagot Ka Isusumbong Kita"
- "Peace Naman"
- "Sa Aking Pag-uwi"
- "Ang Magulang Mo"
- "Hawakan Mong Mabuti"
- "Hindi Ka Magsisisi"
- "Talamak"
- "Buhay Musikero"
- "Buhay Amerika"
- "Anong Ganda"

== See also ==
- Asin (band)
- Juan de la Cruz Band
- Pinoy rock
