= Pinoy rock =

Brand of rock music produced in the Philippines or by Filipinos

- Other names: Filipino rock
- Stylistic origins: Rock music, Manila sound, Philippine folk music
- Cultural origins: 1950s, Manila, Philippines
- Derivative forms: Pinoy reggae

Subgenres
- Bisrock

Other topics
- Pinoy pop; Pinoy hip hop; Pinoy reggae

Pinoy rock, or Filipino rock, is the brand of rock music produced in the Philippines or by Filipinos. It has become as diverse as the rock music genre itself, and bands adopting this style are now further classified under more specific genres or combinations of genres like alternative rock, post-grunge, ethnic, new wave, pop rock, punk rock, funk, reggae, heavy metal, ska, and recently, indie. Because these genres are generally considered to fall under the broad rock music category, Pinoy rock may be more specifically defined as rock music with Filipino cultural sensibilities.

== History ==
=== 1960s: Early years ===
In the early 1960s, electric guitars, drum sets, amplifiers, and echo machines became more available. Filipino instrumental bands popularly called "combos" formed all over the country. They emulated American and British bands like the Fireballs, the Ventures, the Gamblers, and the Shadows. Ramon Jacinto (RJ) and his band the Riots were considered the Ventures of the Philippines.

The arrival of the Beatles in 1966 signaled the end of instrumental music as a genre. Influenced by the British Invasion of which the Beatles were a part of, many Filipino bands began adopting similar musical styles. The Dynasonics (later known as the Dynasouls, and also known as the "Pinoy Beatles") were the premier Beatles band in the country. Other popular combos of the era were D'Swooners (featuring Edmond Fortuno, future drummer for Juan de la Cruz Band and Anak Bayan), D'Downbeats (featuring Pepe Smith, future drummer / lead vocalist for Speed, Glue & Shinki and Juan de la Cruz Band), who were the top billed opening act for The Beatles concert on July 4, 1966, at the Rizal Memorial Coliseum in Manila, the Hi-Jacks (featuring Eddie Mesa, "The Filipino Elvis"), the Bits N’ Pieces, the Boots 'n' Saddles, the Moonstrucks, Tilt Down Men and hundreds of others.

Only a few years earlier, teens formed informal groups using instruments like ukuleles, guitars, and gas cans with a single rope for a stand-up bass and often without amplification. It was similar to the British with their skiffle music, except that Pinoys sang Elvis's songs, not railroad songs. One of the first popular Filipino rockers was Bobby Gonzales, had a hit called "Hahabol-Habol". Eddie Mesa, another teen idol from the period, became known as the "Elvis Presley of the Philippines". As in the 1960s, many Filipinos referred then to rock bands as "combos". Many of these used nontraditional instruments like floor-bass bongos, maracas, and gas tanks.

Easy listening was the popular genre for much of the decade which saw the popularity of Patti Page, Jo Stafford, Perry Como, and Pat Boone, among others. Ricky Nelson, Paul Anka, and Neil Sedaka became teen favorites in the last years of the 1950s. Rock as Filipinos know it did not really attract teenage Filipinos attention until the Ventures and the Shadows came along.

=== 1970s: Manila sound and classic Pinoy rock ===
Into the early 1970s, Filipino music was growing more nationalistic and socio-political in nature, as well as using Tagalog more often. Pop music still dominated the airwaves with disco and funk bands such as Hotdog (band) and APO Hiking Society. Songs like Hotdog's "Ikaw ang Miss Universe ng Buhay Ko" ("You're the Miss Universe of My Life") combined Filipino and English (also known as Taglish) within the same song. Rico J. Puno's cover of "The Way We Were" dominated the airwaves in the mid 1970s and slowly but surely, the popularity of Pinoy pop continued till the end of the decade. Coinciding with the slow demise of that genre was the birth and acceptance of OPM rock. This helped innovate the so-called "Manila sound". Coincidentally, punk and grunge music were re-directing musical trends world-wide and Pinoy rockers followed suit in no time with their own original material.

At this point in time, emerging social and political consciousness somehow crept into the industry with the traditional allied genres that are folk and rock music. Folk musicians and bands included Freddie Aguilar, Asin, Heber Bartolome and Florante. (In 1978, Freddie Aguilar's debut single, "Anak", became the most commercially successful Filipino recording in history. The song became known also in other Asian countries and in Europe.) Perhaps Asin, an ethnic-folk band, was the first commercial band to successfully bring a pro-environment song to the airwaves with "Masdan Mo ang Kapaligiran". Also famous for providing subtle rebellious (anti-Marcos dictatorship sentiment was growing at that time) and peace messages behind its skillful vocal harmonizing, Asin gave the masses hits such as "Bayan Kong Sinilangan (Cotabato)" and "Balita".

Juan de la Cruz Band, a garage and blues-rock influenced group consisting of drummer Joey "Pepe" Smith, bassist Mike Hanopol, and lead guitarist Wally Gonzales, are often credited for ushering in the first "rock & roll revolution" in the Philippines that lasted from the late 1960s to the late 1970s (also known as the "Golden Age of Pinoy Rock").

Being influenced by the counterculture, the bands of the 1970s were known to have never been sidelined commercially and sometimes took the center stage by storm. The radio station DZRJ, particularly the AM weekend "Pinoy Rock and Rhythm" show hosted by the ex-Fine Arts student from Philippine Women's University named Dante David, also known as Howlin' Dave, provided the much-needed support and publicity to Pinoy rock during this era. Another radio program of the 70's was Cousin Hoagy and his Rock and Roll Machine of Blues, Rock and Jazz late into the Martial Law nights. He is still on the air waves.

=== 1980s ===
In the early to mid-1980s, groups like RP, with Goff Macaraeg and Bob Aves, Nuklus, Sinaglahi, UP Sintunado, Patatag, Tambisan, and soloists like the nationalist folk rock singers Paul Galang and Jess Santiago, the progressive folk duo Inang Laya, the progressive Pinoy rock band the Jerks, and Noel Cabangon were a hit on street concerts and campus tours. These groups of artists reunited and formed Buklod (Bukluran ng mga Musikero para sa Bayan), which later Rom Dongeto of Sinaglahi, Noel Cabangon, and Rene Bongcocan of Lingkod Sining took as their new band name when it disbanded after the EDSA Revolution.

The Dawn is another Pinoy rock band that emerged in the 1980s; the songs that they created were influenced by new wave and post-punk. The Dawn released their independently released single "Enveloped Ideas" in 1986.

Many music journalists and enthusiasts, as well as musicians themselves, attributed the flourishing in the mid-1980s of new wave and post-punk influenced bands to DWXB-FM, which began playing independently released singles of unsigned local bands. Other bands emerged, including Dean's December, Ethnic Faces, Identity Crisis, and Violent Playground, all of which were able to record and release their respective albums in the years that followed.

Another band named the Wuds was formed in the 1980s; its members were composed of Alfred Guevara (bass), Bobby Balingit (guitar) and Aji Adriano (drums). The group was established in July 1983. Guevara and Bobby Wuds Balingit were sing-along home boys that were born and bred in the streets of a tough Manila neighborhood. Before forming the group, Guevera and Balingit had first created an acoustic folk singing group called Think God, playing covers of James Taylor and Crosby, Stills and Nash songs at various Shakey's Pizza parlors in the Philippines. They changed their name to the Woods, after the Jethro Tull album Songs from the Wood. Bobby Wuds continues to perform; he attended a street concert in Baguio City during the Baguio Day Celebrations in 2012 that was organized in Assumption Road by Christel Pay Seng.

=== 1990s: Genre expansion ===
During the start of the decade, the Hayp, Introvoys and After Image were among the prominent bands receiving mainstream recognition. An underground music scene was already burgeoning in some unknown bars in Manila. Red Rocks (which later became Club Dredd), together with Mayric's (Sazi's Music Bar) and Kampo (Yosh in the mid-'90s), were the only venues where unsigned bands were allowed to play their own songs. Bands were influenced by such genres as power pop, shoegaze, post-punk, alternative rock (Eraserheads, Color It Red, the Youth, Half Life Half Death, Feet like Fins, Advent Call, Alamid, Parokya ni Edgar), gothic rock (Dominion), hard rock, heavy metal (Razorback, Askals, Wolfgang, Dahong Palay, Datu's Tribe), hardcore (Loads of Motherhood, RDA), punk (Philippine Violators, Bad Omen) and death metal (Skychurch, Genital Grinder, Death After Birth, Disinterment, Mass Carnage, Aroma, Kabaong ni Kamatayan, Barang, WUDS, Yano, Bad Omen, Rumblebelly, Disinterment, Dethrone, Signos, Infernus, and Iconoclast).

The late 1980s and early 1990s marked the beginning of what was known as the era of underground rock and progressive music, with NU 107 playing unknown bands through Francis Brew's In the Raw. It was through this station that many of the prominent and promising rock bands were discovered such as the Breed, GreyHoundz, Slapshock, Sugar Free, Fatal Posporos, Itchyworms, Peryodiko, Monsterbot, Tanya Markova, Pedicab, and many others. NU 107 was the only radio station that played music longer than the standard radio format would allow, as well as soundtracks (The Reel Score). Apart from allotting air time to new and known foreign rock bands such as Save Ferris, Veruca Salt, Metallica, Firehouse, Bon Jovi, Harem Scarem, Audioslave and Soundgarden etc., it gave full exposure to Filipino groups such as Sugar Hiccup, Eraserheads, Imago, Cynthia Alexander, Parokya ni Edgar, Wolfgang, Razorback, Ciudad, Teeth, Urbandub, Put3ska, Tropical Depression, Rivermaya, Yano, Siakol, and Cheese. Its prestigious NU 107 Rock Awards honored the Philippine rock industry's best and brightest for 17 years.

To add to the plight of the underground bands, radio stations would not play their music due to the payola system in the radio industry despite the fact that most of these bands, if not all, had self-produced (indie) albums. But LA 105.9 challenged the current system by providing a venue for the bands to broadcast their original songs. Pinoy rock enthusiasts were finally elated to hear their favorite underground bands ruling the airwaves.

The commercial success of Eraserheads paved the way for more Pinoy rock acts such as Rivermaya, Siakol, Rizal Underground and the Youth getting record deals and spawning singles such as "Ulan" and "Bilanggo". Some brave all-female bands got signed (Kelt's Cross, Tribal Fish, Agaw Agimat) and a few solo artists as well (Maegan Aguilar, Bayang Barrios, DJ Alvaro). Rappers crossed over with great success (Francis M with Hardware Syndrome and Erectus), despite some earlier controversy with hip hop-bashing allegedly incited by some artists. These bands adopted a variety of influences both in image and music; many fell under a particular genre; however, the crossing over of styles was most often inevitable.

The logo of defunct Pinoy rock radio station, NU 107.

By the 1990s, the hardcore punk scene had begun to die down in Manila. "All the punks disappeared," recalls Jep Peligro, creator of Konspirazine, a prominent zine published in the late '90s and early 2000s documenting the local DIY music scene. Still, there were hubs of activity in places such as in Laguna, a province southeast of Manila with a rich DIY punk culture, and the neighboring Cavite region, which is jointly called Strong South known as the punk capital of the Philippines.

=== 2000s ===
In the early 2000s, hip hop, reggae, acoustic pop/jazz and R&B-influenced bands dominated the Philippine music scene, causing Pinoy rock to take a backseat. Only a number of Pinoy rock bands managed to stay in the mainstream during this period. In 2003, a not-so-well-known home-educated DJ named DJ RO started playing in a small bar and restaurant known as Gweilos; DJ RO helped promote the club every Monday night while there was an emergence of Filipino rock bands like Bamboo, Orange and Lemons and Kitchie Nadal that started performing in Gweilos and eventually became popular. In 2004, Pinoy rock once again gained prominence, with the rise of yet another wave of Filipino rock bands. During this time, the Pinoy rock music scene in Cebu also gained exposure.

2001 saw the indie band the Pin-Up Girls, made up of former Keltscross members and underground musicians, signing to Know-It-All Records in Tacoma, Washington, making them the first Manila-based band to sign with an American label. The Pin-Up Girls released an EP worldwide called Taste Test that sold out. Know-It-All then printed a new batch dubbed "Taste Test: The Expanded Menu". The rest of the 2000s further ushered in the mainstream buzz on Pinoy rock, and along with it bands that leaned more towards pop sensibilities. During this time, bands such as Hale, Cueshe, Sponge Cola and Callalily gained mainstream exposure.

2006 was when Filipino band, Kāla appeared in the commercial music scene with their full-length album titled Manila High, distributed by SonyBMG Music Entertainment. Their first hit was "Jeepney" which was released in the summer of 2006. According to the Philippine Daily Inquirer, the band started the resurgence of the Manila sound genre into the modern world through their own mix of funky, jazzy electronic rock music. The band was also part of the tribute album Hopia Mani Popcorn. They made a funky remake of VST & Co.'s "Rock Baby Rock" which hit number 1 in the airwaves.

In recent years as well, bands like Urbandub, Pupil, Chicosci, Slapshock and Typecast have also played in other countries such as Singapore and the US, amongst others. Some have even garnered nominations and recognition from internationally based publications and award-giving bodies. This is mainly attributed to the effect of the internet and globalization on almost anything including music, as listeners from other countries can now see and hear songs and videos of bands overseas without leaving their country.

=== 2010s ===
In mid-2010, NU 107, known as the nation's premier FM station using a rock format, had been taken down as it was sold by its management after declining interest in the audience. In the early 2010s, rock music was still largely popular in the country despite a decline in sales, due to the domination of K-pop, pop and electronic music, and the rise of music streaming services.

During the early 2010s, new acts emerged such as Gracenote and Tanya Markova. Up Dharma Down, later became UDD in 2017, became an early staple of a resurgence with the popularity of their signature single "Tadhana" and the release of their 2012 album Capacities.

Following NU leaving the airwaves, another FM station, Jam 88.3 fully transitioned to alternative rock/indie pop, including songs played by local popular rock artists and bands. Since 2013, the station began playing songs from local and unsigned Filipino independent artists/bands through its supplemental program Fresh Filter.

2013 saw the re-emergence of Pinoy indie music. Some indie acts became popular (and eventually went mainstream) such as Autotelic, Bullet Dumas, Ang Bandang Shirley, Cheats, BP Valenzuela, She's Only Sixteen, The Ransom Collective, Oh, Flamingo!, Sud, MilesExperience, Tom's Story, Ben&Ben, IV of Spades, December Avenue (band), Clara Benin, Reese Lansangan, and others. Today, various indie bands continue to perform through daily/weekly gig schedules at popular gig places like B-Side and SaGuijo in Makati, Route 196 (closed in 2020) and Mow's Bar in Quezon City, 19 East in Parañaque, 70s Bistro in Anonas, and at various music festivals (such as Wanderland, UP (University of the Philippines) Fair, Rakrakan Festival, and Fete de la Musique Philippines).

In 2015, entrepreneur and musician Ramon "RJ" Jacinto launched the Pinoy Rock 'n Roll Hall of Fame, which was established to recognize notable Filipino musicians.

During the final years of the 2010s, the genre also gave prominence of Pinoy artists from outside the Philippine territory, including UK-based Filipino independent artists Beabadoobee and No Rome.

=== 2020s ===
The COVID-19 pandemic halted the Philippine music industry, with many music venues being closed and concerts/festivals being either postponed or canceled. But the pandemic also gave artists and bands more time to bring new releases, recorded from their respective homes.

The late 2010s/early 2020s gave birth of new breed of rock and indie artists/bands: Magnus Haven, Bandang Lapis, the Vowels They Orbit, Maki, Lola Amour, Nobita, SunKissed Lola, Dilaw, Zild Benitez, Ena Mori, Cup of Joe, Over October, and Hey June! released their own respective recordings.

== See also ==
- List of Pinoy rock groups
- Music of the Philippines
