= Juan de la Cruz Band =

Filipino rock band

- Origin: Manila, Philippines
- Genres: Manila sound, Pinoy rock, OPM
- Years active: 1970–1981; 1998–2019
- Labels: Vicor Music Corporation; Blackgold Records
- Past members: Mike Hanopol; Wally Gonzalez; Joey "Pepe" Smith; Edmond Fortuno; Bing Labrador; Alex Cruz; Bó Razon; Sandy Tagarro; Clifford Ho; Rene Sogueco; Romy Santos; Bobot Guerrero; Tony Rodriguez; Larry Martinez; Nides Aranzamendez; Nick Boogie

The Juan de la Cruz Band was a Filipino rock group formed in 1970, that pioneered what became known as Pinoy rock.

The Juan de la Cruz Band formed in early 1970. Founding band members Mike Hanopol, Wally Gonzalez and Joey "Pepe" Smith credited fellow founding member, drummer Edmond Fortuno (a.k.a. "Bosyo"), with having introduced the band's name (Tagalog to English translation - “John Doe”). In December 1970, the band was lauded for headlining the first open field rock festival in the Philippines. In 1972, they released their first album as a quintet, and thereafter gained momentum when it was performed in a rock opera with the Manila Symphony Orchestra, the first production of its kind in the country. Juan de la Cruz reinvented itself in 1973 as a power trio and rose to stardom as the premier rock band in the Philippines.

== History ==
=== Up in Arms ===
The original Juan de la Cruz Band, consisting of Mike Hanopol (bass / lead vocals), Edmond Fortuno (drums / backing vocals), Bó Razon (lead guitar), Bing Labrador (electric piano / electric organ) and Alex Cruz (alto saxophone / baritone saxophone / flute), was formed in 1970. In 1971 Wally Gonzalez (lead guitar, backing vocals) joined replacing Bó Razon. Some time later Sandy Tagarro joined (bass / backing vocals) replacing Mike Hanopol (who was contacted to join Joey Pepe Smith's Japanese group, Speed, Glue & Shinki to replace the original bassist Masayoshi Kabe). In December 1970, they performed in the Antipolo Rock Festival (the Philippine equivalent to the Woodstock festival of 1969). They were subsequently tapped in September 1971 as the featured rock band in tandem with the Manila Symphony Orchestra (conducted by Redentor Romero) for the Philippine production of the rock opera by Tim Rice and Andrew Lloyd Webber, Jesus Christ Superstar, at the Cultural Center of the Philippines. Consequent to his dramatic part as the Judas character in the rock opera production, Sandy Tagarro vacated his bass guitar instrumentalist role in the group and was replaced by Clifford Ho (bass / vocals).

Upon the conclusion of the Jesus Christ Superstar production, Edmond Fortuno (aka “Edmund”, or by his nickname "Bosyo"), Bing Labrador and Alex Cruz (with guitarists Vic Naldo, Marlon Ilagan, and bassist Sonny Tolentino) formed a splinter group, Anak Bayan in late 1971 (Tagalog to English translation - “Child Of The Land”) which, together with the Manila Symphony Orchestra, performed for another major production run at the Cultural Center, the rock opera, Tommy by the Who. Anak Bayan would later release their self-titled album in 1977 (although recorded on a band session in 1973), and in 1978, they released the single "Pagbabalik ng Kuwago" (and its B-side, "Sirang Plaka") with the new lineup aside from Bosyo: Jun Lopito and Gary Perez on guitars, and Gil Lemque on bass.

The versatile Sandy Tagarro (drums / lead vocals) returned to the Juan de la Cruz Band, occupying the drummer's seat as Edmond Fortuno's replacement, and also as the band's lead vocalist; while Clifford Ho continued on bass. Rene Sogueco (electric piano electric organ / vocals) was also recruited to replace Bing Labrador. A musician from the Manila Symphony Orchestra (whom they had befriended in the Jesus Christ Superstar production), Romy Santos (alto saxophone / baritone saxophone / flute / clarinet), replaced Alex Cruz.

In the wake of this major revamp, the Juan de la Cruz Band recorded its first album in 1972, entitled Up in Arms, which was released by Vicor Music Corporation under its Sunshine Records imprint in July 1972. However, complications in the band caused Sandy Tagarro to leave abruptly barely after concluding the Up in Arms recording sessions; not even to pose for the album's photography. Consequently, the group picture for the LP's album cover showed a different drummer (Bobot Guerrero), with Sandy Tagarro's name stricken off the personnel credits, with exception of a parenthetical credit of him as composer of one song ("Lady in White Satin"). Bobot Guerrero's entry as the new drummer of Juan de la Cruz continued through the promotional run of the album and into concerts and club stints.

The Up in Arms album was not a commercial success and had not been reissued, by Vicor Music Corporation to date. An unauthorized compact disc translation of the LP (albeit excellently remastered and packaged) by Shadoks/Normal Music (Bonn, Germany) with spurious bonus tracks from a later edition of the band—is sold in online Internet shops. Wally Gonzales is showcased as a rock guitarist with progressive leanings in this early effort. In several months, bassist Clifford Ho (briefly replaced by Tony Rodriguez), and keyboardist Rene Sogueco had also left (briefly replaced by Larry Martinez).

It was during this transition phase that Mike Hanopol and Joey Smith had recently returned to the Philippines in September 1972 from a successful sojourn in Japan. In early 1973, Mike Hanopol (bass / piano / lead vocals) rejoined the group and Joey “Pepe” Smith (drums / acoustic & electric guitar / lead vocals) also joined the Juan de la Cruz Band for the first time.

Joey Smith had also accepted a cameo singing role at the Cultural Center's "Little Theater" for an abortive rock musical (produced by Carlitos Benavides) based on Erich Segal's novel then in vogue, Love Story, in which the Juan de la Cruz Band was once again called upon to perform.

This was also the period when the members of Juan de la Cruz Band and Anak Bayan were freely associating and performing collectively as a "supergroup" ensemble in various concerts. Nides Aranzamendez (drums) notable rock drummer also jammed with the group and performed on the classic first live album, "Super Session".

=== Himig Natin ===
The state of Juan de la Cruz's flux and gradual dissolution led Wally Gonzalez to reconvene an all-new powerhouse trio, together with Joey Smith (later a.k.a. "Pepe Smith") as singer-drummer-composer; and with singer-bassist-composer Mike Hanopol. Smith and Hanopol collaborated in Tokyo with Japanese guitarist Shinki Chen in a heavy psychedelic blues "free-rock" trio setup called Speed, Glue & Shinki, which had released two seminal albums for Atlantic Records Japan. Rock music historian Julian Cope narrates in his book, Japrocksampler (Bloomsbury, 2007), that Shinki Chen had recruited Joey “Pepe” Smith on drums / lead vocal (and Masayoshi Kabe on bass guitar and later Kabe's replacement, Mike Hanopol on bass guitar) from a Filipino rock group called Zero History, which he found performing at Astro shopping mall in Yokohama, Japan. (Zero History additional members included Mike Hanopol on bass guitar & Wally Gonzalez on lead guitar.) And thus the vibe of Speed, Glue & Shinki is noteworthy in the earliest contributions of Smith and Hanopol for the Juan de la Cruz collaboration, especially in the stop-start heaviness of "Take You Home" (a song by the American heavy psych group Fields, originally released in 1969, revived from the eponymous second album of S,G&S), and the talking blues of "Blues Train".

The track, "Himig Natin" (English translation: "Our Hymn") by the trio Gonzalez, Smith & Hanopol, became a part of Manila's post-hippie culture and underground radio network, particularly the DZRJ-AM radio show, Pinoy Rock 'n' Rhythm, later on shortened to "Pinoy rock". The song is known as the first example of Pinoy rock. Himig Natin rallied Pinoy rock, which swelled into a movement and provided indicators of its yet-unrealized commercial fuel. The impact of the Juan de la Cruz Band inadvertently became the catalyst for the inception of Original Pilipino Music (OPM) and the viability for diverse, originally-authored musical genres to emerge and thrive in the Philippines.

== Deaths ==
Longtime band drummer / guitarist / lead vocalist Joey "Pepe" Smith died on January 28, 2019, at the age of 71. Founding lead guitarist Wally Gonzales died on July 23, 2021, also aged 71.

== Band members ==
=== Former ===
- Sandy Tagarro
- Edmund Fortuno
- Bing Labrador
- Alex Cruz
- Clifford Ho
- Larry Martinez
- Tony Rodriguez
- Pepe Smith (1947–2019) his death)
- Wally Gonzalez (1949–2021)
- Mike Hanopol

== Discography ==
=== Studio albums ===
- 1972: Up in Arms (Philippines LP - Vicor/Sunshine Records / German CD - Normal Records/Shadoks Music, 2001)

Note: The Juan Dela Cruz management had issued a statement that the German CD reissue is unauthorized. The CD also contains six unverified "live" bonus tracks, which may have been lifted from The Super Hits of the Juan Dela Cruz Band / Live and In Concert album, which is also tagged as being unauthorized and spurious.

- 1973: Himig Natin (LP, Vicor/Sunshine Records / CD, Vicor/Sunshine, released 2004 - officially reissued on LP by Vicor 2021)
- 1974: Maskara (LP, Vicor/Sunshine Records / CD, Vicor/Sunshine, released 2004)
- 1981: Kahit Anong Mangyari (LP, Blackgold Records)

=== Live / compilation albums ===
- 1975: Super Session (LP, Vicor/Sunshine Records)
- 1977: The Super Hits of the Juan Dela Cruz Band / Live and in Concert (LP, Vicor/Sunshine Records)

Note: The Juan Dela Cruz management had issued statements that this release was spurious. Tracks were implied to be original studio tracks with applause merely added artificially.

=== Compilations ===
- 1980: The Best of Juan Dela Cruz Band (LP, Vicor/Sunshine Records)
- 1983: The Best of Pinoy Rock (LP, Blackgold Records)
- 1985: The Best of Pinoy Rock Vol. 1 & 2 (Collectors' Edition LP, Blackgold Records)
- 1994: Himig Natin (Special Collector's Edition) (Vicor Music Corporation / Blackgold Records

Note: This compilation is actually a 15-track hodge-podge of selections from Himig Natin, Maskara, Super Session and Kahit Anong Mangyari.

- Pinoy Rock (undated, circa 2008) (Vicor)
- 2014: Tatak: Greatest Hits (Poly East Records)

== Awards ==
The band were awarded the ASAP Pinoy Band's Special Lifetime Achievement Award on ASAP Natin 'To (formerly ASAP) in 2017, for their contributions to Filipino music as one of the greatest Pinoy rock bands in OPM rock history.

== See also ==
- Asin
- Freddie Aguilar
- Sampaguita
