= List of Everybody, Sing! season 2 episodes =

- More about the series

Episodes overview
- Total episode(s): 44 episodes
- Aired episode(s): 26 episodes
- Rerun(s): 18 episodes
- Last updated on August 18, 2024

The second season of the musical game show Everybody, Sing! ran from September 24, 2022, until February 19, 2023, and had aired a total of 44 episodes, consisting of 26 aired episodes and 18 episode re-runs.

Twenty six groups have played for this season and only five groups had won the jackpot prize of ₱1,000,000 during the entire run.

== Episodes overview ==
Legend

The Songbayanan received the highest possible amount as their winning prize in the jackpot round (₱1,000,000.)
The Songbayanan did not receive the highest possible amount as their winning prize in the jackpot round.
The Songbayanan did not receive any amount as their winning prize in the jackpot round.
No data.

List of Everybody, Sing! season 2 episodes
Episode		Songbayanan	Prize won	Ref.
No.	Airing date	Songbayanan	Prize won	Ref.
Season 2
1	September 24, 2022	50 Beauticians	₱1,000,000	
2	September 25, 2022	50 Mall Sale Clerks	₱70,000	
3	October 1, 2022	50 Kusinero't Kusinera (Chefs)	₱50,000	
4	October 2, 2022	50 Quiapo Vendors	₱40,000 (Note: Excluding additional cash prize given by Vice Ganda.)	
5	October 8, 2022	50 Construction Workers	₱80,000	
6	October 9, 2022	50 Sales Agents	₱60,000	
7	October 15, 2022	50 Mananahi (Dressmakers)	₱90,000	
8	October 16, 2022	50 Bank Employees	₱1,000,000	
9	October 29, 2022	50 Funeral and Cemetery Workers	₱50,000	
10	October 30, 2022	50 Repair and Service Technicians	₱90,000	
11	November 5, 2022	50 Gasoline Station Employees	₱1,000,000	
12	November 12, 2022	50 Karding Survivors & Heroes	₱60,000	
13	November 13, 2022	50 Mangingisda (Fishermen)	₱40,000	
14	November 19, 2022	50 Kambal at Triplets (Twins & Triplets)	₱40,000	
15	November 20, 2022	50 Drag Queens	₱60,000	
16	December 4, 2022	50 MMK Letter Senders	₱70,000	
17	December 10, 2022	50 Models	₱30,000	
18	December 17, 2022	50 Christmas Workers	₱50,000	
19	January 1, 2023	50 Bartenders	₱1,000,000	
20	January 7, 2023	50 Magsasaka (Farmers)	₱20,000	
21	January 15, 2023	50 Traffic Enforcers	₱80,000	
22	January 21, 2023	50 Overseas Filipino Workers (OFWs)	₱40,000	
23	January 28, 2023	50 Tricycle Drivers	₱70,000	
24	February 4, 2023	50 Pahinante (Porters)	₱70,000	
25	February 11, 2023	50 Dentists	₱70,000	
26	February 19, 2023	50 Magkasintahan at Mag-ex (Lovers and Exes)	₱1,000,000	

== Episodes ==
Legend

- – The SONGpu contestant successfully guessed the line of the song correctly.
- – The SONGpu contestant failed to give any correct line of the song.
- – During the Jackpot round ("Everybody GuesSing"), the Songbayanan guessed the song correctly.
- – During the Jackpot round ("Everybody GuesSing"), the Songbayanan did not guess the song correctly.

Week 1 (September 24–25, 2022)
Episode		Songbayanan	Preliminary rounds														Jackpot round (Everybody GuesSing)		Prize won	Ref.
Episode		Songbayanan	Game	Song	SONGpu											Timer	Songs		Prize won	Ref.
No.	Airing date	Songbayanan	Game	Song	Row	1	2	3	4	5	6	7	8	9	10	Timer	Songs		Prize won	Ref.
1	September 24, 2022	50 Beauticians #EverybodySingBeauticians	Sing in the Blank	"Mangarap Ka" by AfterImage	2											80 secs.	"Iskul Bukol" by Tito Sotto, Vic Sotto and Joey de Leon	"Hurting Inside" by FOJ	₱1,000,000	
1	September 24, 2022	50 Beauticians #EverybodySingBeauticians	PicSing a Broken Song	"Magkasuyo Buong Gabi" by Agsunta	5											80 secs.	"Ako Naman Muna" by Angela Ken	"Araw-araw, Gabi-gabi" by Didith Reyes	₱1,000,000	
1	September 24, 2022	50 Beauticians #EverybodySingBeauticians	The ChooSing One	"And I Am Telling You I'm Not Going" by Jennifer Hudson	1											80 secs.	"Spoliarium" by Eraserheads	"Pare, Mahal Mo Raw Ako" by Michael Pangilinan	₱1,000,000	
1	September 24, 2022	50 Beauticians #EverybodySingBeauticians	TagaliSing	"AMAKABOGERA" by Maymay Entrata	4											80 secs.	"London Bridge Is Falling Down"	"Tensionado" by Soapdish	₱1,000,000	
1	September 24, 2022	50 Beauticians #EverybodySingBeauticians	ReverSing	"Mula sa Puso" by Jovit Baldivino	3											80 secs.	"Ang Pag-Ibig Kong Ito" by Moonstar88	"Mahal Na Kita" by BGYO	₱1,000,000	
2	September 25, 2022	50 Mall Sales Clerks #EverybodySingMall	Sing in the Blank	"Bitiw" by Sponge Cola	2											85 secs.	"Bongga Ka Day" by Hotdog	"Mr. Right" by Kim Chiu	₱70,000	
2	September 25, 2022	50 Mall Sales Clerks #EverybodySingMall	TagaliSing	"Sila" by SUD	1											85 secs.	"Pangarap" by Maymay Entrata	"Boy" by Timmy Cruz	₱70,000	
2	September 25, 2022	50 Mall Sales Clerks #EverybodySingMall	PicSing a Broken Song	"A Thousand Miles" by Vanessa Carlton	5											85 secs.	"Better World" by Smokey Mountain	"Lagi" by Bini	₱70,000	
2	September 25, 2022	50 Mall Sales Clerks #EverybodySingMall	The ChooSing One	"Diwata" by Sam Concepcion	4											85 secs.	"Ipagpatawad Mo" by VST & Co.	"Malaya" by Moira Dela Torre	₱70,000	
2	September 25, 2022	50 Mall Sales Clerks #EverybodySingMall	ReverSing	"Ibigay Mo Na" by Jessa Zaragoza	3											85 secs.	"Sigurado" by Belle Mariano	"Kembot" by Amber Davis	₱70,000	

Week 2 (October 1–2, 2022)
Episode		Songbayanan	Preliminary rounds														Jackpot round (Everybody GuesSing)		Prize won	Ref.
Episode		Songbayanan	Game	Song	SONGpu											Timer	Songs		Prize won	Ref.
No.	Airing date	Songbayanan	Game	Song	Row	1	2	3	4	5	6	7	8	9	10	Timer	Songs		Prize won	Ref.
3	October 1, 2022	50 Kusinero't Kusinera #EverybodySingKusina	Sing in the Blank	"Pare Ko" by Eraserheads	1											96 secs.	"Bawal Lumabas" by Kim Chiu	"You're Makin' Me Kilig" by Shawntel	₱50,000	
3	October 1, 2022	50 Kusinero't Kusinera #EverybodySingKusina	PicSing a Broken Song	"Don't Cry Out Loud" by Melissa Manchester	2											96 secs.	"Kung Ako Na Lang Sana" by Bituin Escalante	"Jam" by Cooky Chua and Kevin Roy	₱50,000	
3	October 1, 2022	50 Kusinero't Kusinera #EverybodySingKusina	TagaliSing	"Oo" by UDD	4											96 secs.	"Baka Ikaw" by The Company	"In or Out" by Sandara Park	₱50,000	
3	October 1, 2022	50 Kusinero't Kusinera #EverybodySingKusina	The ChooSing One	"Paraluman" by Adie	5											96 secs.	"Sasamahan Kita" by Loisa Andalio	"Kahit Ayaw Mo Na" by This Band	₱50,000	
3	October 1, 2022	50 Kusinero't Kusinera #EverybodySingKusina	ReverSing	"Makita Kang Muli" by Sugarfree	3											96 secs.	"Unli" by BoybandPH	"Awit ng Pangarap" by Yeng Constantino	₱50,000	
4	October 2, 2022	50 Quiapo Vendors #EverybodySingQuiapo	Sing in the Blank	"Titser's Enemy No. 1" by Juan de la Cruz Band	4											62 secs.	"You'll Always Be My No. 1" by Vernie Varga	"Ikaw Lamang" by Zsa Zsa Padilla	₱40,000	
4	October 2, 2022	50 Quiapo Vendors #EverybodySingQuiapo	EngliSing ang Lyrics	"This Love" by Maroon 5	2											62 secs.	"Each Day With You" by Martin Nievera	"Pangarap Kong Pangarap Mo" by Zephanie	₱40,000	
4	October 2, 2022	50 Quiapo Vendors #EverybodySingQuiapo	The Choosing One	"Gusto Ko Nang Bumitaw" by Morissette	5											62 secs.	"Boom Panes" by Vice Ganda	"Kaleidoscope World" by Francis Magalona	₱40,000	
4	October 2, 2022	50 Quiapo Vendors #EverybodySingQuiapo	PicSing a Broken Song	"Maling Akala" by Brownman Revival	1											62 secs.	"Sana Kahit Minsan" by Ariel Rivera	"Ale" by the Bloomfields	₱40,000	
4	October 2, 2022	50 Quiapo Vendors #EverybodySingQuiapo	ReverSing	"Kapag Ako Ay Nagmahal" by Jolina Magdangal	3											62 secs.	"Usahay" by Pilita Corrales	"Somewhere In My Past" by Julie Vega	₱40,000	

Week 3 (October 8–9, 2022)
Episode		Songbayanan	Preliminary rounds														Jackpot round (Everybody GuesSing)		Prize won	Ref.
Episode		Songbayanan	Game	Song	SONGpu											Timer	Songs		Prize won	Ref.
No.	Airing date	Songbayanan	Game	Song	Row	1	2	3	4	5	6	7	8	9	10	Timer	Songs		Prize won	Ref.
5	October 8, 2022	50 Construction Workers #EverybodySingConstruction	Sing in the Blank	"Princesa" by Teeth	2											70 secs.	"Ikaw Ang Aking Mahal" by VST & Co.	"Bagong Simula" by Jem Macatuno	₱80,000	
5	October 8, 2022	50 Construction Workers #EverybodySingConstruction	PicSing a Broken Song	"Magandang Dilag" by JM Bales	1											70 secs.	"Ulan" by Rivermaya	"Kung Ako’y Iiwan Mo" by Basil Valdez	₱80,000	
5	October 8, 2022	50 Construction Workers #EverybodySingConstruction	TagaliSing	"Torpe" by Hungry Young Poets	3											70 secs.	"Sama-sama" by Alamid	"Girl Be Mine" by Francis Magalona	₱80,000	
5	October 8, 2022	50 Construction Workers #EverybodySingConstruction	The ChooSing One	"Heaven" by Bryan Adams	5											70 secs.	"Goodboy" by Blakdyak	"Thank You For The Love" by All Star Cast	₱80,000	
5	October 8, 2022	50 Construction Workers #EverybodySingConstruction	ReverSing	"Hawak Kamay" by Yeng Constantino	4											70 secs.	"Buko" by Jireh Lim	"Anong Nangyari Sa Ating Dalawa" by Ice Seguerra	₱80,000	
6	October 9, 2022	50 Sales Agents #EverybodySingSales	Sing in the Blank	"Sa Aking Puso" by Ariel Rivera	3											96 secs.	"Baliw" by Edward Barber and Maymay Entrata	"Raise Your Flag" by Kritiko featuring KZ Tandingan	₱60,000	
6	October 9, 2022	50 Sales Agents #EverybodySingSales	TagaliSing	"Migraine" by Moonstar88	5											96 secs.	"I-Swing Mo Ako" by Sharon Cuneta	"Paano Ba ang Magmahal" by Piolo Pascual With Sarah Geronimo	₱60,000	
6	October 9, 2022	50 Sales Agents #EverybodySingSales	PicSing a Broken Song	"Barely Breathing" by Duncan Shiek	1											96 secs.	"Nanghihinayang" by Jeremiah	"Cool Off" by Yeng Constantino	₱60,000	
6	October 9, 2022	50 Sales Agents #EverybodySingSales	The Choosing One	"Kulang Ako Kung Wala Ka" by Erik Santos	4											96 secs.	"Bye Bye Na" by Rico Blanco	"Can This Be Love" by Smokey Mountain	₱60,000	
6	October 9, 2022	50 Sales Agents #EverybodySingSales	ReverSing	"Maging Sino Ka Man" by Erik Santos	2											96 secs.	"Tag-ulan" by AfterImage	"I'm Feeling Sexy Tonight" by Chona Cruz	₱60,000	

Week 4 (October 15–16, 2022)
Episode		Songbayanan	Preliminary rounds														Jackpot round (Everybody GuesSing)		Prize won	Ref.
Episode		Songbayanan	Game	Song	SONGpu											Timer	Songs		Prize won	Ref.
No.	Airing date	Songbayanan	Game	Song	Row	1	2	3	4	5	6	7	8	9	10	Timer	Songs		Prize won	Ref.
7	October 15, 2022	50 Mananahi #EverybodySingTahi	Sing in the Blank	"Halaga" by Parokya ni Edgar	4											69 secs.	"Nosi Balasi" by Sampaguita	"Akin Ka Na Lang" by Morissette	₱90,000	
7	October 15, 2022	50 Mananahi #EverybodySingTahi	EngliSing ang Lyrics	"Friend of Mine" by Odette Quesada	3											69 secs.	"Babalik Sa'yo" by Moira Dela Torre	"Kabataan Para sa Kinabukasan" by Francis Magalona	₱90,000	
7	October 15, 2022	50 Mananahi #EverybodySingTahi	PicSing a Broken Song	"I Want You Back" by NSYNC	1											69 secs.	"Si Felimon" by Yoyoy Villame	"Ikaw ang Miss Universe ng Buhay Ko" by Hotdog	₱90,000	
7	October 15, 2022	50 Mananahi #EverybodySingTahi	The ChooSing One	"Pangako Sa'yo" by Vina Morales	5											69 secs.	"Oh My Darling Clementine"	"Sukob Na" by 17:28	₱90,000	
7	October 15, 2022	50 Mananahi #EverybodySingTahi	ReverSing	"Imahe" by Magnus Haven	2											69 secs.	"Love Has Come My Way" by Heart Evangelista	"Photograph" by Ariel Rivera	₱90,000	
8	October 16, 2022	50 Bank Employees #EverybodySingBank	Sing in the Blank	"Gitara" by Parokya ni Edgar	5											69 secs.	"Liwanag sa Dilim" by Rivermaya	"Limang Dipang Tao" by Ryan Cayabyab	₱1,000,000	
8	October 16, 2022	50 Bank Employees #EverybodySingBank	PicSing a Broken Song	"Achy Breaky Heart" by Billy Ray Cyrus	2											69 secs.	"Kakaibabe" by Donnalyn Bartolome	"Karakaraka" by Vice Ganda	₱1,000,000	
8	October 16, 2022	50 Bank Employees #EverybodySingBank	TagaliSing	"Ako'y Sa'yo, Ika'y Akin Lamang" by I Axe	1											69 secs.	"So It's You" by Raymond Lauchengco	"Gusto Na Kitang Makita" by SessiOnroad	₱1,000,000	
8	October 16, 2022	50 Bank Employees #EverybodySingBank	The Choosing One	"Pagsamo" by Arthur Nery	4											69 secs.	"No Erase" by James Reid and Nadine Lustre	"Kailan Kaya" by Sheryn Regis	₱1,000,000	
8	October 16, 2022	50 Bank Employees #EverybodySingBank	ReverSing	"Para Sa Akin" by Sitti	3											69 secs.	"Jeepney Love Story" by Yeng Constantino	"Say That You Love Me" by Martin Nievera	₱1,000,000	

Week 5 (October 29–30, 2022)
Episode		Songbayanan	Preliminary rounds														Jackpot round (Everybody GuesSing)		Prize won	Ref.
Episode		Songbayanan	Game	Song	SONGpu											Timer	Songs		Prize won	Ref.
No.	Airing date	Songbayanan	Game	Song	Row	1	2	3	4	5	6	7	8	9	10	Timer	Songs		Prize won	Ref.
9	October 29, 2022	50 Funeral and Cemetery Workers #EverybodySingUndas	Sing in the Blank	"Habang Buhay" by Zack Tabudlo	1											62 secs.	"Otso Otso" by Bayani Agbayani	"Ang Lahat Para Sa'yo" by Sheryn Regis	₱50,000	
9	October 29, 2022	50 Funeral and Cemetery Workers #EverybodySingUndas	A-B-Sing	"I Believe In Dreams" by Janno Gibbs	4											62 secs.	"Mga Anghel Na Walang Langit" by Kristel Fulgar	"Sana'y Maghintay ng Walang Hanggan" by Sharon Cuneta	₱50,000	
9	October 29, 2022	50 Funeral and Cemetery Workers #EverybodySingUndas	PicSing a Broken Song	"Dangerous" by Roxette	3											62 secs.	"Awitin Mo, Isasayaw Ko" by VST & Co.	"Crazy Love" by Kim Chiu	₱50,000	
9	October 29, 2022	50 Funeral and Cemetery Workers #EverybodySingUndas	The ChooSing One	"Hanggang Dito Na Lang" by Jaya	5											62 secs.	"Sa Panaginip Na Lang" by Alamat	"Nanggigigil" by Hagibis	₱50,000	
9	October 29, 2022	50 Funeral and Cemetery Workers #EverybodySingUndas	Ayu-SING Mo	"Suntok Sa Buwan" by SessiOnroad	2											62 secs.	"Baa Baa Black Sheep"	"Oha "Kaya Mo Ba 'To" by Enrique Gil	₱50,000	
10	October 30, 2022	50 Repair and Service Technicians #EverybodySingRepair	Sing in the Blank	"Sinta" by Aegis	3											74 secs.	"This Time" by Freestyle	"Isang Bandila" by Rivermaya	₱90,000	
10	October 30, 2022	50 Repair and Service Technicians #EverybodySingRepair	PicSing a Broken Song	"I Want to Know What Love Is" by Tina Arena	1											74 secs.	"Kikay" by Viva Hot Babes	"Diamante" by Morissette	₱90,000	
10	October 30, 2022	50 Repair and Service Technicians #EverybodySingRepair	A-B-Sing	"Kumpas" by Moira Dela Torre	4											74 secs.	"Doon Lang" by Nonoy Zuñiga	"Kung Alam Mo Lang" by Bandang Lapis	₱90,000	
10	October 30, 2022	50 Repair and Service Technicians #EverybodySingRepair	The ChooSing One	"Everlasting Love" by The Company	5											74 secs.	"Forevermore" by Side A	"One" by Heart Evangelista	₱90,000	
10	October 30, 2022	50 Repair and Service Technicians #EverybodySingRepair	Ayu-SING Mo	"Ikaw Lamang" by Silent Sanctuary	2											74 secs.	"Tumitigil Ang Mundo" by BGYO	"Alipin Ako" by Laarni Lozada	₱90,000	

Week 6 (November 5, 2022)
Episode		Songbayanan	Preliminary rounds														Jackpot round (Everybody GuesSing)		Prize won	Ref.
Episode		Songbayanan	Game	Song	SONGpu											Timer	Songs		Prize won	Ref.
No.	Airing date	Songbayanan	Game	Song	Row	1	2	3	4	5	6	7	8	9	10	Timer	Songs		Prize won	Ref.
11	November 5, 2022	50 Gasoline Station Employees #EverybodySingGas	Sing in the Blank	"Sandalan" by 6 Cyclemind	2											70 secs.	"Pen Pen De Sarapen"	"Tuloy Pa Rin" by Neocolours	₱1,000,000	
11	November 5, 2022	50 Gasoline Station Employees #EverybodySingGas	A-B-Sing	"All I Have to Give" by Backstreet Boys	3											70 secs.	"Gisingin ang Puso" by Liezel Garcia	"O Pag-ibig" by Bailey May and Ylona Garcia	₱1,000,000	
11	November 5, 2022	50 Gasoline Station Employees #EverybodySingGas	The ChooSing One	"Kung Maibabalik Ko Lang" by Regine Velasquez	5											70 secs.	"Kilometro" by Sarah Geronimo	"Superhero" by Rocksteddy	₱1,000,000	
11	November 5, 2022	50 Gasoline Station Employees #EverybodySingGas	PicSing a Broken Song	"Porque" by Maldita	4											70 secs.	"Sorry" by Paolo Sandejas	"Pangarap Ka" by Geneva Cruz	₱1,000,000	
11	November 5, 2022	50 Gasoline Station Employees #EverybodySingGas	Ayu-SING Mo	"Ngayon" by Basil Valdez	1											70 secs.	"Mr. DJ" by Sharon Cuneta	"Sirena" by Gloc-9	₱1,000,000	

Week 7 (November 12–13, 2022)
Episode		Songbayanan	Preliminary rounds														Jackpot round (Everybody GuesSing)		Prize won	Ref.
Episode		Songbayanan	Game	Song	SONGpu											Timer	Songs		Prize won	Ref.
No.	Airing date	Songbayanan	Game	Song	Row	1	2	3	4	5	6	7	8	9	10	Timer	Songs		Prize won	Ref.
12	November 12, 2022	50 Karding Survivors & Heroes #EverybodySingTulong	Sing in the Blank	"As Long As You Love Me" by Backstreet Boys	4											87 secs.	"Kailan" by Smokey Mountain	"Patawad, Paalam" by I Belong To The Zoo and Moira Dela Torre	₱60,000	
12	November 12, 2022	50 Karding Survivors & Heroes #EverybodySingTulong	PicSing a Broken Song	"Tabing Ilog" by Barbie's Cradle	3											87 secs.	"Miss Flawless" by Angelica Jones	"Jingle Bells"	₱60,000	
12	November 12, 2022	50 Karding Survivors & Heroes #EverybodySingTulong	A-B-Sing	"Simpleng Tulad Mo" by Daniel Padilla	5											87 secs.	"Ang Huling El Bimbo" by Eraserheads	"Dati" by Sam Concepcion and Tippy Dos Santos (feat. Quest)	₱60,000	
12	November 12, 2022	50 Karding Survivors & Heroes #EverybodySingTulong	The ChooSing One	"Pangarap Ko Ang Ibigin Ka" by Regine Velasquez	1											87 secs.	"Pumapag-ibig" by Marion Aunor featuring Rizza Cabrera and Seed Bunye	"Kahit Saan, Kahit Kailan" by Alexa Ilacad	₱60,000	
12	November 12, 2022	50 Karding Survivors & Heroes #EverybodySingTulong	AYU-Sing Mo	"Habang May Buhay" by After Image	2											87 secs.	"Nasa Puso" by Janine Berdin	"Philippine Geography" by Yoyoy Villame	₱60,000	
13	November 13, 2022	50 Mangingisda #EverybodySingIsda	Sing in the Blank	"Umiiyak Ang Puso" by April Boy Regino	3											63 secs.	"Loving You" by Ric Segreto	"Nais Ko" by Basil Valdez	₱40,000	
13	November 13, 2022	50 Mangingisda #EverybodySingIsda	PicSing a Broken Song	"Mahika" by Adie and Janine Berdin	2											63 secs.	"Deck The Halls"	"Tagu-taguan" by Moira Dela Torre	₱40,000	
13	November 13, 2022	50 Mangingisda #EverybodySingIsda	A-B-Sing	"Everybody Wants to Rule the World" by Tears for Fears	4											63 secs.	"Ikaw Ang Idol Ko" by Cinderella	"Sa Iyo" by Sarah Geronimo	₱40,000	
13	November 13, 2022	50 Mangingisda #EverybodySingIsda	The ChooSing One	"Wala Na Talaga" by Klarisse	1											63 secs.	"Haypa" by MMJ	"Ikaw Pala" by Heaven Peralejo	₱40,000	
13	November 13, 2022	50 Mangingisda #EverybodySingIsda	AYU-Sing Mo	"Paalam Na" by Klarisse	5											63 secs.	"Reaching Out" by Gary Valenciano	"Dapat Ka Bang Mahalin" by Sharon Cuneta	₱40,000	

Week 8 (November 19–20, 2022)
Episode		Songbayanan	Preliminary rounds														Jackpot round (Everybody GuesSing)		Prize won	Ref.
Episode		Songbayanan	Game	Song	SONGpu											Timer	Songs		Prize won	Ref.
No.	Airing date	Songbayanan	Game	Song	Row	1	2	3	4	5	6	7	8	9	10	Timer	Songs		Prize won	Ref.
14	November 19, 2022	50 Kambal at Triplets #EverybodySingMukha	Sing in the Blank	"Don't Know What To Do, Don't What You Say" by Ric Segreto	4											88 secs.	"Mobe" by Enrique Gil	"Isang Linggong Pag-Ibig" by Imelda Papin	₱40,000	
14	November 19, 2022	50 Kambal at Triplets #EverybodySingMukha	PicSing a Broken Song	"Nakapagtataka" by Rachel Alejandro	1											88 secs.	"O Come All Ye Faithful"	"Ang Lahat Para Sa'yo" by Sheryn Regis	₱40,000	
14	November 19, 2022	50 Kambal at Triplets #EverybodySingMukha	A-B-Sing	"Stars" by Callalily	3											88 secs.	"Sundo" by Imago	"Mahal Kita Pero" by Janella Salvador	₱40,000	
14	November 19, 2022	50 Kambal at Triplets #EverybodySingMukha	The ChooSing One	"Pano" by Zack Tabudlo	5											88 secs.	"Paraisong Parisukat" by Basil Valdez	"Sana Sana" by Angeline Quinto	₱40,000	
14	November 19, 2022	50 Kambal at Triplets #EverybodySingMukha	AYU-Sing Mo	"Buko" by Jireh Lim	2											88 secs.	"Kundiman" by Rob Deniel	"Manok Ni San Pedro" by Max Surban	₱40,000	
15	November 20, 2022	50 Drag Queens #EverybodySingDrag	Sing in the Blank	"Asan Ka Na Ba" by Zack Tabudlo	1											71 secs.	"Babae" by Hagibis	"Tag-araw" by AfterImage	₱60,000	
15	November 20, 2022	50 Drag Queens #EverybodySingDrag	A-B-Sing	"Shine" by Regine Velasquez	2											71 secs.	"Miss Na Miss Kita" by Father and Sons	"No Touch" by Juan de la Cruz Band	₱60,000	
15	November 20, 2022	50 Drag Queens #EverybodySingDrag	PicSing a Broken Song	"Boom Panes" by Vice Ganda	3											71 secs.	"Sana'y Maghintay ng Walang Hanggan" by Sharon Cuneta	"Elesi" by Rivermaya	₱60,000	
15	November 20, 2022	50 Drag Queens #EverybodySingDrag	The Choosing One	"How Could You Say You Love Me" by Sarah Geronimo	5											71 secs.	"Boom Goes My Heart" by Bailey May	"Away in a Manger"	₱60,000	
15	November 20, 2022	50 Drag Queens #EverybodySingDrag	AYU-Sing Mo	"Defying Gravity" by Idina Menzel	4											71 secs.	"Malayo Pa Ang Umaga" by Rey Valera	"T.L. Ako Sayo" by Cinderella	₱60,000	

Week 9 (December 4, 2022)
Episode		Songbayanan	Preliminary rounds														Jackpot round (Everybody GuesSing)		Prize won	Ref.
Episode		Songbayanan	Game	Song	SONGpu											Timer	Songs		Prize won	Ref.
No.	Airing date	Songbayanan	Game	Song	Row	1	2	3	4	5	6	7	8	9	10	Timer	Songs		Prize won	Ref.
16	December 4, 2022	50 MMK Letter Senders #EverybodySingMaalaala	Sing in the Blank	"Magsayawan" by VST & Co.	3											77 secs.	"If We Fall In Love" by Yeng Constantino	"No Way To Treat A Heart" by Martin Nievera	₱70,000	
16	December 4, 2022	50 MMK Letter Senders #EverybodySingMaalaala	PicSing a Broken Song	"Left And Right" by Charlie Puth ft. Jungkook	2											77 secs.	"Say You'll Never Go" by Neocolours	"Magkaisa" by Virna Lisa	₱70,000	
16	December 4, 2022	50 MMK Letter Senders #EverybodySingMaalaala	EngliSing ang Lyrics	"To Love Again" by Sharon Cuneta	5											77 secs.	"12 Days of Christmas"	"Langit Lupa" by Moira Dela Torre	₱70,000	
16	December 4, 2022	50 MMK Letter Senders #EverybodySingMaalaala	The Choosing One	"Ordinary People" by John Legend	4											77 secs.	"Patuloy Ang Pangarap" by Angeline Quinto	"Halik sa Hangin" by Abra with Ebe Dancel	₱70,000	
16	December 4, 2022	50 MMK Letter Senders #EverybodySingMaalaala	AYU-Sing Mo	"Nangangamba" by Zack Tabudlo	1											77 secs.	"I Can" by Do-Re-Mi (Donna Cruz, Mikee Cojuangco and Regine Velasquez)	"Happy To Be Me" by Andrea Brillantes	₱70,000	

Week 10 (December 10, 2022)
Episode		Songbayanan	Preliminary rounds														Jackpot round (Everybody GuesSing)		Prize won	Ref.
Episode		Songbayanan	Game	Song	SONGpu											Timer	Songs		Prize won	Ref.
No.	Airing date	Songbayanan	Game	Song	Row	1	2	3	4	5	6	7	8	9	10	Timer	Songs		Prize won	Ref.
17	December 10, 2022	50 Models #EverybodySingModels	Sing in the Blank	"Macho Gwapito" by Rico J. Puno	1											73 secs.	"Leron Leron Sinta"	"Simpleng Tao" by Gloc-9	₱30,000	
17	December 10, 2022	50 Models #EverybodySingModels	PicSing a Broken Song	"Til I Found You" by Freestyle	2											73 secs.	"Recuerdo de Amor" by Jessa Zaragoza	"Para sa Masa" by Eraserheads	₱30,000	
17	December 10, 2022	50 Models #EverybodySingModels	A-B-Sing	"Bakit" by Rachelle Ann Go	5											73 secs.	"Rainbow" by South Border	"Dulce Tirah-tirah" by Denelle F	₱30,000	
17	December 10, 2022	50 Models #EverybodySingModels	The Choosing One	"I Like Me Better" by Lauv	3											73 secs.	"Bulag Pipi At Bingi" by Freddie Aguilar	"Alipin" by Shamrock	₱30,000	
17	December 10, 2022	50 Models #EverybodySingModels	AYU-Sing Mo	"Mahal Kita Pero" by Janella Salvador	4											73 secs.	"Ikaw Lang Naman" by Elaine Duran	"Sana Ikaw" by Piolo Pascual	₱30,000	

Week 11 (December 17, 2022)
Episode		Songbayanan	Preliminary rounds														Jackpot round (Everybody GuesSing)		Prize won	Ref.
Episode		Songbayanan	Game	Song	SONGpu											Timer	Songs		Prize won	Ref.
No.	Airing date	Songbayanan	Game	Song	Row	1	2	3	4	5	6	7	8	9	10	Timer	Songs		Prize won	Ref.
18	December 17, 2022	50 Christmas Workers #EverybodySingPasko	Sing in the Blank	"Kamusta Ka" by Rey Valera	2											91 secs.	"You Are The One" by Toni Gonzaga	"You'll Be Safe Here" by Rivermaya	₱50,000	
18	December 17, 2022	50 Christmas Workers #EverybodySingPasko	PicSing a Broken Song	"Babaero" by Randy Santiago	1											91 secs.	"Ilagay Mo Kid" by Hagibis	"Sa Panaginip Lang" by Alamat	₱50,000	
18	December 17, 2022	50 Christmas Workers #EverybodySingPasko	The ChooSing One	"Tahanan" by Adie	5											91 secs.	"Pwede Ba" by Soapdish	"Everyday" by Agot Isidro	₱50,000	
18	December 17, 2022	50 Christmas Workers #EverybodySingPasko	TagaliSing	"Puede Ba" by Maymay Entrata	5											91 secs.	"May Minamahal" by Hajji Alejandro	"Ikaw" by Sharon Cuneta	₱50,000	
18	December 17, 2022	50 Christmas Workers #EverybodySingPasko	AYU-Sing Mo	"Pakisabi Na Lang" by The Company	4											91 secs.	"Christmas in Our Hearts" by Jose Mari Chan	"Ibulong Sa Hangin" by Sarah Geronimo	₱50,000	

Week 12 (January 1, 2023)
Episode		Songbayanan	Preliminary rounds														Jackpot round (Everybody GuesSing)		Prize won	Ref.
Episode		Songbayanan	Game	Song	SONGpu											Timer	Songs		Prize won	Ref.
No.	Airing date	Songbayanan	Game	Song	Row	1	2	3	4	5	6	7	8	9	10	Timer	Songs		Prize won	Ref.
19	January 1, 2023	50 Bartenders #EverybodySingBar	Sing in the Blank	"Manila" by Hotdog	5											93 secs.	"Taralets" by Imago	"Ang Boyfriend Kong Baduy" by Cinderella	₱1,000,000	
19	January 1, 2023	50 Bartenders #EverybodySingBar	PicSing a Broken Song	"Mundo" by IV of Spades	1											93 secs.	"Langit Na Naman" by Hotdog	"Kahit Kailan" by South Border	₱1,000,000	
19	January 1, 2023	50 Bartenders #EverybodySingBar	A-B-Sing	"Isa Lang" by Arthur Nery	2											93 secs.	"Silent Night"	"Tinatapos Ko Na" by Jona	₱1,000,000	
19	January 1, 2023	50 Bartenders #EverybodySingBar	The Choosing One	"Sayang Na Sayang" by Aegis	4											93 secs.	"Ika’y Mahal Pa Rin" by Rockstar	"Ikaw At Ako" by Jason Marvin and Moira Dela Torre	₱1,000,000	
19	January 1, 2023	50 Bartenders #EverybodySingBar	AYU-Sing Mo	"Babalik Sa'yo" by Moira Dela Torre	3											93 secs.	"Huwag Mo Nang Itanong" by Eraserheads	"Time In" by Yeng Constantino	₱1,000,000	

Week 13 (January 7, 2023)
Episode		Songbayanan	Preliminary rounds														Jackpot round (Everybody GuesSing)		Prize won	Ref.
Episode		Songbayanan	Game	Song	SONGpu											Timer	Songs		Prize won	Ref.
No.	Airing date	Songbayanan	Game	Song	Row	1	2	3	4	5	6	7	8	9	10	Timer	Songs		Prize won	Ref.
20	January 7, 2023	50 Magsasaka #EverybodySingMagsasaka	Sing in the Blank	"Beh, Buti Nga" by Hotdog	2											69 secs.	"Hindi Kita Malilimutan" by Basil Valdez	"Ako'y Maghihintay" by Mark Bautista and Sarah Geronimo	₱20,000	
20	January 7, 2023	50 Magsasaka #EverybodySingMagsasaka	TagaliSing	"Langis At Tubig" by Sharon Cuneta	4											69 secs.	"Mahal Pa Rin Kita" by Rockstar	"Walang Kapalit" by Rey Valera	₱20,000	
20	January 7, 2023	50 Magsasaka #EverybodySingMagsasaka	PicSing a Broken Song	"Duyan" by Sarah Geronimo	5											69 secs.	"Tong Tong Tong Pakitong Kitong"	"Bukas Na Lang Kita Mamahalin" by Lani Misalucha	₱20,000	
20	January 7, 2023	50 Magsasaka #EverybodySingMagsasaka	The Choosing One	"Esperanza" by April Boy Regino	1											69 secs.	"Mas Mabuti Pa" by Janine Berdin	"Umiibig Na Nga" by April Boy Regino	₱20,000	
20	January 7, 2023	50 Magsasaka #EverybodySingMagsasaka	AYU-Sing Mo	"No One Else Comes Close" by Backstreet Boys	3											69 secs.	"If" by Nelson Del Castillo	"Hanggang Wala Nang Bukas" by Ebe Dancel	₱20,000	

Week 14 (January 15, 2023)
Episode		Songbayanan	Preliminary rounds														Jackpot round (Everybody GuesSing)		Prize won	Ref.
Episode		Songbayanan	Game	Song	SONGpu											Timer	Songs		Prize won	Ref.
No.	Airing date	Songbayanan	Game	Song	Row	1	2	3	4	5	6	7	8	9	10	Timer	Songs		Prize won	Ref.
21	January 15, 2023	50 Traffic Enforcers #EverybodySingTraffic	Sing in the Blank	"Luha" by Aegis	3											97 secs.	"Ganyan Talaga Ang Pag-Ibig" by April Boys	"I Heart You" by Daniel Padilla	₱80,000	
21	January 15, 2023	50 Traffic Enforcers #EverybodySingTraffic	A-B-Sing	"Chinita Girl" by Lil Vinceyy ft. Guel	2											97 secs.	"Nung Tayo Pa" by Janella Salvador	"Da Coconut Nut" by Smokey Mountain	₱80,000	
21	January 15, 2023	50 Traffic Enforcers #EverybodySingTraffic	The Choosing One	"Minsan Lang Kita Iibigin" by Ariel Rivera	5											97 secs.	"Sampung Mga Daliri"	"Oh Babe" by Singsing	₱80,000	
21	January 15, 2023	50 Traffic Enforcers #EverybodySingTraffic	PicSing a Broken Song	"Won't Go Home Without You" by Maroon 5	1											97 secs.	"Lift Up Your Hands" by Basil Valdez	"Love Without Time" by Nonoy Zuñiga	₱80,000	
21	January 15, 2023	50 Traffic Enforcers #EverybodySingTraffic	AYU-Sing Mo	"Kung Kailangan Mo Ako" by Rey Valera	4											97 secs.	"Wala Na Bang Pag-ibig" by Jaya	"Tagpuan" by Moira Dela Torre	₱80,000	

Week 15 (January 21, 2023)
Episode		Songbayanan	Preliminary rounds														Jackpot round (Everybody GuesSing)		Prize won	Ref.
Episode		Songbayanan	Game	Song	SONGpu											Timer	Songs		Prize won	Ref.
No.	Airing date	Songbayanan	Game	Song	Row	1	2	3	4	5	6	7	8	9	10	Timer	Songs		Prize won	Ref.
22	January 21, 2023	50 Overseas Filipino Workers #EverybodySingOFW	Sing in the Blank	"Rock Baby Rock by VST & Co.	2											66 secs.	"Before I Let You Go" by Freestyle	"I" by 6cyclemind	₱40,000	
22	January 21, 2023	50 Overseas Filipino Workers #EverybodySingOFW	PicSing a Broken Song	"High" by Lighthouse Family	5											66 secs.	"Imposible" by KZ Tandingan	"Bakit Papa" by SexBomb Girls	₱40,000	
22	January 21, 2023	50 Overseas Filipino Workers #EverybodySingOFW	A-B-Sing	"Dito Ba" by Kuh Ledesma	3											66 secs.	"Kung Tayo'y Magkakalayo" by Rey Valera	"Salamat" by Yeng Constantino	₱40,000	
22	January 21, 2023	50 Overseas Filipino Workers #EverybodySingOFW	The Choosing One	"Time Machine" by Six Part Invention	1											66 secs.	"Stay" by Cueshé	"Naririnig Mo Ba" by Morissette	₱40,000	
22	January 21, 2023	50 Overseas Filipino Workers #EverybodySingOFW	AYU-Sing Mo	"Dati Dati" by Sarah Geronimo	4											66 secs.	"Abot Langit" by Maris Racal and Rico Blanco	"Ayoko Na Sana" by Ariel Rivera	₱40,000	

Week 16 (January 28, 2023)
Episode		Songbayanan	Preliminary rounds														Jackpot round (Everybody GuesSing)		Prize won	Ref.
Episode		Songbayanan	Game	Song	SONGpu											Timer	Songs		Prize won	Ref.
No.	Airing date	Songbayanan	Game	Song	Row	1	2	3	4	5	6	7	8	9	10	Timer	Songs		Prize won	Ref.
23	January 28, 2023	50 Tricycle Drivers #EverybodySingToda	Sing in the Blank	"...Baby One More Time" by Britney Spears	1											58 secs.	"Kabataang Pinoy" by Itchyworms	"Ililigtas Ka Niya" by Gary Valenciano	₱70,000	
23	January 28, 2023	50 Tricycle Drivers #EverybodySingToda	A-B-Sing	"Nang Dahil Sa Pag-ibig" by Tootsie Guevarra	3											58 secs.	"Kaliwete" by Eraserheads	"Para Lang Sa'yo" by Ice Seguerra	₱70,000	
23	January 28, 2023	50 Tricycle Drivers #EverybodySingToda	PicSing a Broken Song	"Awit Ng Kabataan" by Rivermaya	5											58 secs.	"Iingatan Ka" by Carol Banawa	"Mag-Exercise Tayo" by Yoyoy Villame	₱70,000	
23	January 28, 2023	50 Tricycle Drivers #EverybodySingToda	The Choosing One	"Bakit Nga Ba Mahal Kita" by Roselle Nava	4											58 secs.	"Feel Good Pilipinas" by BGYO and KZ Tandingan	"Kung Akin Ang Mundo" by Erik Santos	₱70,000	
23	January 28, 2023	50 Tricycle Drivers #EverybodySingToda	AYU-Sing Mo	"Chinito" by Yeng Constantino	2											58 secs.	"Stay" by Carol Banawa	"Bring Me Down" by Rivermaya	₱70,000	

Week 17 (February 4, 2023)
Episode		Songbayanan	Preliminary rounds														Jackpot round (Everybody GuesSing)		Prize won	Ref.
Episode		Songbayanan	Game	Song	SONGpu											Timer	Songs		Prize won	Ref.
No.	Airing date	Songbayanan	Game	Song	Row	1	2	3	4	5	6	7	8	9	10	Timer	Songs		Prize won	Ref.
24	February 4, 2023	50 Pahinante #EverybodySingBuhat	Sing in the Blank	"Laklak" by Teeth	4											78 secs.	"Pinoy Ako" by Orange and Lemons	"Nasa Iyo Na Ang Lahat" by Daniel Padilla	₱70,000	
24	February 4, 2023	50 Pahinante #EverybodySingBuhat	A-B-Sing	"Dahil Mahal na Mahal Kita" by Roselle Nava	1											78 secs.	"Kulang Ang Mundo" by Sam Mangubat	"Sumayaw Ka" by Gloc-9	₱70,000	
24	February 4, 2023	50 Pahinante #EverybodySingBuhat	Pic-Sing a Broken Song	"Trip" by 6cyclemind	2											78 secs.	"Balisong" by Rivermaya	"Hiling" by Jay-R Siaboc	₱70,000	
24	February 4, 2023	50 Pahinante #EverybodySingBuhat	The ChooSing One	"New Rules" by Dua Lipa	5											78 secs.	"Gaano Ko Ikaw Kamahal" by Celeste Legaspi	"Ako Ay Pilipino" by Kuh Ledesma	₱70,000	
24	February 4, 2023	50 Pahinante #EverybodySingBuhat	Ayu-Sing Mo	"Naaalala Ka" by Rey Valera	3											78 secs.	"Unbreakable" by Regine Velasquez-Alcasid and Moira Dela Torre	"Mahal Kita, Mahal Mo Siya, Mahal Niya ay Iba" by Sharon Cuneta	₱70,000	

Week 18 (February 11, 2023)
Episode		Songbayanan	Preliminary rounds														Jackpot round (Everybody GuesSing)		Prize won	Ref.
Episode		Songbayanan	Game	Song	SONGpu											Timer	Songs		Prize won	Ref.
No.	Airing date	Songbayanan	Game	Song	Row	1	2	3	4	5	6	7	8	9	10	Timer	Songs		Prize won	Ref.
25	February 11, 2023	50 Dentists #EverybodySingSmile	Sing in the Blank	"Ulan" by Cueshe	2											87 secs.	"Next in Line" by Afterimage	"Pagbigyang Muli" by Erik Santos	₱70,000	
25	February 11, 2023	50 Dentists #EverybodySingSmile	PicSing a Broken Song	"Paraiso" by Smokey Mountain	1											87 secs.	"Halukay Ube" by Sexbomb Girls	"Matibay" by Jona	₱70,000	
25	February 11, 2023	50 Dentists #EverybodySingSmile	TagaliSing	"Init sa Magdamag" by Jona	5											87 secs.	"Mahal Kita Ayaw Mo Na" by Bugoy Drilon	"Raise Your Flag" by Kritiko	₱70,000	
25	February 11, 2023	50 Dentists #EverybodySingSmile	The ChooSing One	"Dying Inside to Hold You" by Timmy Thomas (version of Darren Espanto)	4											87 secs.	"Ikot-ikot" by Sarah Geronimo	"Higher Love" by Angeline Quinto	₱70,000	
25	February 11, 2023	50 Dentists #EverybodySingSmile	Ayu-Sing Mo	"In Love Ako Sa 'Yo" by Nyoy Volante (version of Darren Espanto)	3											87 secs.	"Aking Prinsesa" by Gimme 5	"Hanggang May Kailanman" by Carol Banawa	₱70,000	

Week 19 (February 19, 2023)
Episode		Songbayanan	Preliminary rounds														Jackpot round (Everybody GuesSing)		Prize won	Ref.
Episode		Songbayanan	Game	Song	SONGpu											Timer	Songs		Prize won	Ref.
No.	Airing date	Songbayanan	Game	Song	Row	1	2	3	4	5	6	7	8	9	10	Timer	Songs		Prize won	Ref.
25	February 19, 2023	50 Magkasintahan at Mag-Ex #EverybodySingLove	Sing in the Blank	"Tuloy Pa Rin" by Neocolours	5											91 secs.	"Titibo-tibo" by Moira Dela Torre	"Natataranta" by James Reid	₱1,000,000	
25	February 19, 2023	50 Magkasintahan at Mag-Ex #EverybodySingLove	PicSing a Broken Song	"Banal na Aso, Santong Kabayo" by Yano	2											91 secs.	"Tao" by Sampaguita	"Kahit Habang Buhay" by Smokey Mountain	₱1,000,000	
25	February 19, 2023	50 Magkasintahan at Mag-Ex #EverybodySingLove	EngliSing ang Lyrics	"Let the Pain Remain" by Rachel Alejandro	1											91 secs.	"Tayong Dalawa" by Rey Valera	"Laki sa Layaw" by Mike Hanopol	₱1,000,000	
25	February 19, 2023	50 Magkasintahan at Mag-Ex #EverybodySingLove	The ChooSing One	"Last Dance" by Donna Summer	4											91 secs.	"Antukin" by Rico Blanco	"The Spageti Song" by Sexbomb Girls	₱1,000,000	
25	February 19, 2023	50 Magkasintahan at Mag-Ex #EverybodySingLove	Ayu-Sing Mo	"Ikaw" by Yeng Constantino	3											91 secs.	"Tagumpay Nating Lahat" by Lea Salonga	"Panahon Na Naman" by Rivermaya	₱1,000,000	

== Statistics ==
=== Scoring ===
This section includes the scoring of all groups throughout their respective games.

Table showing the number of correct answers of games played by every Songbayanan
Songbayanan	A-B-Sing	Ayu-Sing Mo	EngliSing ang Lyrics	PicSing a Broken Song	ReverSing	Sing in the Blank	TagaliSing	The ChooSing One	Total No. of Correct Answers	Avg. No. of Correct Answers (Note: The average is rounded off to the nearest number.)
50 Beauticians	—	—	—	5	9	1	4	10	29	6
50 Mall Sales Clerks	—	—	—	4	5	8	7	9	33	7
50 Kusinero't Kusinera	—	—	—	7	8	8	9	9	41	8
50 Quiapo Vendors	—	—	3	7	5	3	—	7	25	5
50 Construction Workers	—	—	—	5	5	7	5	8	30	6
50 Sales Agents	—	—	—	2	10	7	9	10	38	8
50 Mananahi	—	—	3	5	5	6	—	9	28	6
50 Bank Employees	—	—	—	4	5	2	9	7	27	5
50 Funeral & Cemetery Workers	4	4	—	4	—	4	—	9	25	5
50 Repair & Service Technicians	2	7	—	3	—	9	—	9	30	6
50 Gasoline Station Employees	6	4	—	5	—	7	—	9	31	6
50 Karding Survivors & Heroes	4	8	—	5	—	10	—	9	36	7
50 Mangingisda	2	3	—	2	—	10	—	9	26	5
50 Kambal at Triplets	5	8	—	9	—	7	—	6	35	7
50 Drag Queens	8	4	—	5	—	3	—	9	29	6
50 MMK Letter Senders	—	4	9	7	—	3	—	9	32	6
50 Models	6	6	—	5	—	3	—	8	28	6
50 Christmas Workers	—	9	—	8	—	8	4	7	36	7
50 Bartenders	6	6	—	9	—	8	—	9	38	8
50 Magsasaka	—	4	—	4	—	5	5	10	28	6
50 Traffic Enforcers	4	9	—	7	—	9	—	8	37	7
50 Overseas Filipino Workers	7	4	—	3	—	6	—	9	29	6
50 Tricycle Drivers	9	2	—	3	—	3	—	10	27	6
50 Pahinante	8	6	—	4	—	10	—	5	33	7
50 Dentists	—	7	—	6	—	7	7	7	34	7
50 Magkasintahan at Mag-Ex	—	7	7	8	—	6	—	8	36	7
Avg. No. of Correct Answers	5	6	6	5	7	6	7	8	32	6

==== Perfect scores ====
This section includes the groups that have a perfect game of a round (10 correct answers).

- ReverSing: 1 (50 Sales Agents)
- Sing in the Blank: 3 (50 Karding Survivors and Heroes, 50 Mangingisda, 50 Pahinante)
- The ChooSing One: 4 (50 Beauticians, 50 Sales Agents, 50 Magsasaka, 50 Tricycle Drivers)

==== Almost perfect scores ====
This section only includes the groups that almost had a perfect score on a game (9 out of 10 correct answers).

- A-B-Sing: 1 (50 Tricycle Drivers)
- Ayu-Sing Mo: 2 (50 Christmas Workers, Traffic Enforcers)
- EngliSing ang Lyrics: 1 (50 MMK Letter Senders)
- PicSing a Broken Song: 2 (50 Kambal at Triplets, Bartenders)
- ReverSing: 1 (50 Beauticians)
- Sing in the Blank: 2 (50 Traffic Enforcers, Repair and Service Technicians)
- TagaliSing: 3 (50 Kusinero't Kusindera, Sales Agents, Bank Employees)
- The ChooSing One: 12 (50 Mangingisda, Repair and Service Technicians, Bartenders, Karding Survivors and Heroes, Gasoline Station Employees, Overseas Filipino Workers, Mananahi, Funeral and Cemetery Workers, MMK Letter Senders, Drag Queens, Kusinero't Kusinera, Mall Sales Clerks)

==== Half scores ====
This section only includes the groups that had five correct and wrong answers in a game.

- A-B-Sing: 1 (50 Kambal at Triplets)
- PicSing a Broken Song: 7 (50 Beauticians, Construction Workers, Karding Survivors and Heroes, Models, Drag Queens, Gasoline Station Employees, Mananahi)
- ReverSing: 5 (50 Quiapo Vendors, Construction Workers, Mananahi, Mall Sales Clerks, Bank Employees)
- Sing in the Blank: 1 (50 Magsasaka)
- TagaliSing: 2 (50 Construction Workers, Magsasaka)
- The ChooSing One: 1 (50 Pahinante)

==== Low scores ====
This section only includes the groups that had a low score on a game (0 to 4 correct answers).

- A-B-Sing: 5 (50 Karding Survivors & Heroes, Funeral & Cemetery Workers, Traffic Enforcers, Mangingisda, Pahinante, Magsasaka, Magkasintahan & Mag-Ex)
- Ayu-Sing Mo: 8 (50 Drag Queens, Gasoline Station Employees, Magsasaka, Funeral & Cemetery Workers, Overseas Filipino Workers, MMK Letter Senders, Mangingisda, Tricycle Drivers)
- EngliSing ang Lyrics: 2 (50 Quiapo Vendors, Mananahi)
- PicSing a Broken Song: 10 (50 Mall Sales Clerks, Bank Employees, Pahinante, Magsasaka, Funeral and Cemetery Workers, Repair and Service Technicians, Overseas Filipino Workers, Tricycle Drivers, Sales Agents, Mangingisda)
- Sing in the Blank: 8 (50 Funeral & Cemetery Workers, MMK Letter Senders, Models, Drag Queens, Tricycle Drivers, Quiapo Vendors, Bank Employees, Beauticians)
- TagaliSing: 2 (50 Christmas Workers, Beauticians)

=== Time Collection & Usage ===
This section includes the most and least seconds banked by each group, and the fastest time for a group to win the jackpot prize.

- Most seconds banked by a group, including extra seconds garnered from Singko Segundo challenge: 97 seconds (50 Traffic Enforcers)
- Most seconds banked by a group, excluding extra seconds garnered from Singko Segundo challenge: 97 seconds (50 Kusinero't Kusinera, 50 Sales Agents)
- Least seconds banked by a group, including extra seconds garnered from Singko Segundo challenge: 58 seconds (50 Tricycle Drivers)
- Least seconds banked by a group, excluding extra seconds garnered from Singko Segundo challenge: 58 seconds (50 Mangingisda, Tricycle Drivers)
- Fastest time for a group to win: 50 seconds (50 Bank Employees)

=== Everybody, GuesSing? ===
This section includes the final outcomes of every group, either good or bad, in the jackpot round.

- Group that almost got the perfect score in Everybody, GuesSing: 2 (50 Mananahi, 50 Repair and Service Technicians)
- Group that got the lowest score in Everybody, GuesSing: 2 (50 Magsasaka) (Note: In total, as calculated at the end of the round, their final score was confirmed two out of ten. They only guessed song numbers three and eight)
- Group that had the highest number of correct streaks in Everybody, GuesSing?: 7 (50 Bartenders) (Note: This Songbayanan correctly guessed the first seven songs in a row during the jackpot round, and then when approached to Song number eight, nine, and ten and started breaking up and that was the only moment they started getting wrong answers.)

== See also ==
- Everybody, Sing!
  - Everybody, Sing! season 1
  - Everybody, Sing! season 2
  - Everybody, Sing! season 3
- List of Everybody, Sing! season 1 episodes
- List of Everybody, Sing! season 3 episodes
