= Snaffu Rigor =

Filipino songwriter and vocalist

- Born: Roberto Nicolas Rigor; August 8, 1946; Abra, Philippines
- Died: August 3, 2016 (aged 69) Manila, Philippines
- Genres: Manila sound
- Occupations: Vocals; songwriter; musician
- Years active: 1964–2016

Roberto Nicolas "Snaffu" Rigor (August 8, 1946 – August 3, 2016) was a Filipino songwriter and vocalist.

He started composing in 1964. His first recorded Tagalog composition was "T.L. Ako Sa'yo", a hit by Cinderella in 1975. He also wrote the lyrics to Ernani Cuenco's "Bato sa Buhangin" and the English version of "Araw-araw, Gabi-gabi". Rigor was a member of the bands Ramrods, Cinderella, Backdoor and Blackbuster, and head of Domestic A&R of Blackgold and 70's Superband.

Rigor died of lung cancer on August 3, 2016, at age 69.

== Personal life ==
Snaffu Rigor was a brother to Spanky Rigor and Male Rigor of the VST & Company.

== Notable compositions ==
- "T.L. Ako sa 'Yo" (music) – recorded by Cinderella
- "Bato sa Buhangin" (lyrics) – co-written with Ernani Cuenco and recorded by Cinderella; used as the theme for the film of the same name starring Fernando Poe Jr. and Vilma Santos. (Won Best Theme Song at the 1977 FAMAS Awards)
- "Bulag, Pipi at Bingi" (music and lyrics) – recorded by Freddie Aguilar (Grand Prize of the 2nd Metropop Music Festival, 1979)
- "Macho Gwapito" (lyrics) – recorded by Rico J. Puno
- "Mr. Dreamboy" (music and lyrics) – recorded by Sheryl Cruz
- "Boy, I Love You" (lyrics adaptation) – recorded by Cherie Gil and re-adapted for Donna Cruz
- "Eto Na Naman" (lyrics) – recorded by Gary Valenciano
- "Gusto Kita" (lyrics) – recorded by Gino Padilla
- "Paano ang Puso Ko" (lyrics) – recorded by April Boy Regino
- "Larawang Kupas" (music and lyrics) – recorded by Jerome Abalos
- "Bumper to Bumper" (music and lyrics) – recorded by Love Añover
- "Byaheng Jeepney" (music and lyrics) – recorded by Nicole & Cris
- "Jowadik" (music and lyrics) – recorded by Nicole & Cris
- "Tambalan" (music and lyrics) – recorded by Nicole & Cris

== Awards ==
- Ulirang Ama Awards, 2006 Ulirang ama sectoral awardee for Arts and Culture conferred by the National Mother's Day and Fathers' Day Foundation, Inc. (June 18, 2006)
- A joint award from The JB Soul Music Specialists, JB Music Studio Multi-purpose Cooperative, and JB Music Studio and Management Co. as "The Incomparable Father of Soul Music in the Philippines". (April 21, 2006)
- Gold Record Award from WEA Records for the outstanding sale of the Album "Walang Ganyanan" as Album Producer (September 29, 1991)
- Awit Awards' Best Album of the Year Album-"for Broken Hearts Only" (June 29, 1991)
- Platinum Record Award from WEA Records for the outstanding sale of the Album "Sheryl" as Album Producer (December 31, 1989)
- Gold Record Award from WEA Records for the outstanding sale of the Album "Sheryl" as Album Producer (August 13, 1989)
- Second Asian Popular Song Festival Awardee as Finalist for the song entry "Illusions". (1982)
- The 2nd Metro Manila Popular Music Festival Awardee as Finalist for the song entry "Bulag Pipi at Bingi". On the same day, this same entry won First Place. (March 2, 1979)
