= Cinderella (Filipino band) =

Filipino pop band

- Origin: Philippines
- Genres: Pop; Manila sound
- Years active: 1974–2011
- Members: Yolly Samson; Violy Estrellado; Sunny Ilacad; Bob Guzman; Celso Llarina; Gig Ilacad
- Past members: Cecile Colayco; Snaffu Rigor

Cinderella is a Filipino pop group that rose to prominence in the 1970s. The group recorded for Sunshine Records, and together with contemporaries Hotdog, formed the impetus of what would be the Manila sound movement. Cinderella's most recognized single is "T.L. Ako Sa'yo" (loosely translated to "You're My True Love", where T.L. is an acronym for "True Love"). Other stand-out songs include such eventual classics as "Bato sa Buhangin" ("Pebbles in the Sand"), "Sa Aking Pag-iisa" ("In My Solitude") and "Superstar ng Buhay Ko" ("Superstar of My Life").

== Background ==
Cinderella's initial line-up consisted of Snaffu Rigor (vocals and drums), Sunny Ilacad (keyboard), Bob Guzman (guitars and vocal back-up), Celso Llarina (rhythm guitar and vocal back-up), Gig Ilacad (bass guitar), Cecile Colayco (lead vocals), and Violy Estrellado (back-up vocals). After the release of their eponymous debut album, Colayco and Estrellado left the group. With the role of lead vocalist having been vacated, University of Santo Tomas student Yolly Samson successfully auditioned for Sunshine and was hired as Colayco's permanent replacement; subsequently becoming the face of Cinderella. Comedians Vic Sotto and Joey de Leon, affiliates of Sunshine and good friends of the group, also contributed songs, the most notable being the hit single "Ang Boyfriend Kong Baduy". With the increase of their popularity, Rigor was commissioned to collaborate with film composer Ernani Cruz and pen the lyrics for the theme song of the Fernando Poe Jr. and Vilma Santos vehicle Bato sa Buhangin (1976), to be recorded by the group. The song gained a sudden resurgence after being covered by Glaiza de Castro for the historical drama picture Goyo (2018).

On November 21, 1997, Yolly Samson died from complications of brain cancer, aged 41. On August 4, 2016, Snaffu Rigor died of lung cancer.

== Language ==
The band wrote their songs in Taglish (code-switching between Tagalog and English) and street jargon that was popular in urban areas during the 1970s.

For example, in the song "T.L. Ako Sa'yo", Cinderella used the word "dehins", formed from hindi ("no"). It is Tagalog street jargon which reverses the word, thereby making it sound like it is English. Also as previously mentioned, the acronym "T.L." stands for "True Love".

The title of the song "Ang Boyfriend Kong Baduy" is also in Taglish, as are its lyrics:

- ...but when we go out dating na, kulay ng polo niya'y pula... ("but when we already go out dating, the colour of his shirt is red")
- ...but when the guests go dancing na, lagi pa syang nauuna... ("but when the guests already go dancing, he's always first")
- ...'di ko ma-take ang gusto. Siya ay in-na-in, ngunit out pa rin... ("I can't stand his tastes. He's so in but still so out")

In the song "Ang Boypren Ko", the word "boypren" is an alteration of the English "boyfriend"; the title literally means "My Boyfriend".

The song "Sana'y Maging Steady Mo" translates to "I Wish I Could Be Your Boyfriend/Girlfriend". In this context, the word "steady" is used as a noun that refers to one's boyfriend or girlfriend.

== Discography ==
=== Albums ===
- Cinderella (1975)
- Ang Boyfriend Kong Baduy (1976)
- Cinderella 2 (1976)
- Yolly Samson Is Cinderella (1977)

=== Songs ===
The band is famous for its soft romantic ballads. Listed below are some of their more prominent hit songs:

- "First Kiss"
- "Love Letters"
- "Tayo'y Mag-Boogie" ("Let's Boogie")
- "First and Last Love"
- "Sana'y Maging Steady Mo"
- "T.L. Ako Sa'yo" (also covered by Jolina Magdangal-Escueta feat. Marvin Agustin in 1997; also covered by Kitchie Nadal in 2007)
- "Sa Aking Pag-iisa"
- "Ikaw ang Idol Ko"
- "Ang Boyfriend Kong Baduy" (also covered by Prettier Than Pink in 1999)
- "Ang Boypren Ko"
- "Tulak ng Bibig, Kabig ng Dibdib"
- "Paano Pa kita Malilimutan"
- "Ang Pag-ibig Mo"
- "Superstar ng Buhay Ko" (also covered by Nora Aunor in 1975; also covered by Pilita Corrales in 1977; also covered by Lindsay Custodio in 1997, Pinoy Gregorian in 2008, Swissy in 2009 & Laura Sophia in 2020)
- "Pag-ibig Ko'y Ibang-iba"
- "May Crush Ako Sa'yo"
- "Ligaw Tingin" (also covered by Leah Navarro in 1979)
- "Nakikining ang Buong Pilipinas"
- "Bato sa Buhangin" (also covered by Juan Pablo Dream in 2009; also covered by Ogie Alcasid in 2012)
- "Love of My Life"

== Covers ==
- Lilet covered "Tulak ng Bibig, Kabig ng Dibdib", which was included on her album In Bloom, released in April 1992.
- Jolina Magdangal and Marvin Agustin covered "T.L. Ako Sa'yo", from the film Kung Ayaw Mo, Huwag Mo!. Magdangal also covered "Tulak ng Bibig, Kabig ng Dibdib", both featured on the film soundtrack and Jolina '98.
- Kitchie Nadal also covered "T.L. Ako Sa'yo", from the various artists album, Hopia Mani Popcorn in 2009.
- Juan Pablo Dream covered "Bato sa Buhangin", from the various artists album, Hopia Mani Popcorn 2 in 2010.
- Ric Manrique, Jr. also covered "Bato sa Buhangin".
- Ogie Alcasid also covered "Bato sa Buhangin".
- Prettier Than Pink covered "Ang Boyfriend Kong Baduy".
- Kathryn Bernardo also covered the song as "First Kiss" and "Superstar ng Buhay Ko", in her second album Lovelife with Kath, released in July 2017.
- Kisses Delavin also covered "Tulak ng Bibig, Kabig ng Dibdib", which was included on her debut album Kisses, released in November 2017.
- Glaiza de Castro also covered "Bato sa Buhangin" as the theme song from the 2018 film Goyo: Ang Batang Heneral.
- Morissette and Jane Oineza also covered "Bato sa Buhangin" in her duet song in 2019.
