= The Best of Manila Sound: Hopia Mani Popcorn =

Compilation album by Various Artists
- Released: 2006
- Genres: OPM, Manila Sound
- Label: Viva Records
- Producers: Vic Del Rosario Jr. and Vincent Del Rosario

Various Artists chronology
The Best of Manila Sound: Hopia Mani Popcorn (2006)	The Best of Manila Sound: Hopia Mani Popcorn 2 (2007)

Singles from The Best of Manila Sound: Hopia Mani Popcorn
- 1. "No Touch"; 2. "Ipagpatawad Mo"; 3. "Rock Baby Rock"

The Best of Manila Sound: Hopia Mani Popcorn is a compilation album of Manila Sound hit songs that gained popularity in the Philippines during the 1970s. The album is composed of 13 classic Manila Sound tracks which are interpreted and performed by modern Filipino bands such as Rocksteddy, Mayonnaise, Kapatid, Soapdish, Kala, Up Dharma Down, 6cyclemind, Protein Shake, DRT, Radioactive Sago Project, Sound, Join the Club and Kitchie Nadal.

The album was released by Viva Records in the Philippines in 2006 with the two carrier singles "No Touch" by Rocksteddy and "Ipagpatawad Mo" by Mayonnaise. "Rock Baby Rock", performed by Kala was the third single taken from the album.

== Background ==
In 2006, Viva Records began conceptualizing a project to bring back the Manila Sound hit songs that were largely popular in the country during the 1970s. Viva made a shortlist of Filipino bands that could join the project, which was welcomed with enthusiasm by the bands.

According to the press release of Viva Records for the album:

The Best of Manila Sound: Hopia, Mani, Popcorn is not your usual tribute album. It doesn't pay tribute to the music of just one artist or band, but to the music of a whole generation.

The album is sponsored by DWTM Magic 89.9, Information Gateway, GMA-7, Manila Bulletin and MYX.

== Track listing ==
1. "No Touch" - 03:15 by Rocksteddy (originally by Juan de la Cruz Band)
2. "Ipagpatawad Mo" - 04:04 by Mayonnaise (originally by VST & Co.)
3. "Hanggang Magdamag" - 03:41 by Kapatid (originally by Soul Jugglers)
4. "TL Ako Sa'yo" - 03:26 by Kitchie Nadal (originally by Cinderella)
5. "Kahit Maputi Na ang Buhok Ko" - 02:59 by SoapDish (originally by Rey Valera)
6. "Rock Baby Rock" - 04:29 by Kala (originally by VST & Co.)
7. "Bitin Sa'yo" - 02:54 by Up Dharma Down (originally by Hotdog)
8. "Bonggahan" - 03:10 by 6cyclemind (originally by Sampaguita)
9. "Macho Gwapito" - 02:56 by Protein Shake (originally by Rico J. Puno)
10. "Tao" - 05:44 by DRT (originally by Sampaguita)
11. "Kapalaran" - 03:26 by Radioactive Sago Project (originally by Rico J. Puno)
12. "Ako Si Superman" - 03:37 by Sound (originally by Rey Valera)
13. "Handog" - 04:12 by Join the Club (originally by Florante)

== Album sales performance ==
The album received a Gold Record certification as of January 2007. The certification was awarded to the participating artist on January 14, 2007 on SOP.
