= Florante =

Filipino singer-songwriter (born 1952)

- Born: Florante De Leon; April 29, 1952 (age 74); Manila
- Other name: Florante
- Occupation: Singer-songwriter

Florante de Leon, known mononymously as Florante, is a Filipino singer-songwriter.

== Career ==
He was a pioneer and leading exponent of Pinoy folk rock during the DZRJ-AM radio boom in Manila during the 1970s. His more popular singles include the hit ballad, "Handog" (Offering) and other songs, such as "Ako'y Isang Pinoy" (I Am A Filipino), "Abakada" (A-B-C-D), "Digmaan" (War) and "Pinay" (Filipino Woman), which form part of the musical genre called Manila sound. He influenced other singer-songwriters that followed, particularly during the emergence of OPM; these artists include Joey Ayala, Freddie Aguilar and Heber Bartolome.

=== Manila sound ===
Even though a folk singer, Florante also became a part of the 1970s Manila sound. In 2006, Join the Club's hard rock revival of "Handog" was included in the Hopia Mani Popcorn revival album.

== Political views ==
In 1986, Florante campaigned for the reelection of president Ferdinand Marcos in the 1986 snap election, being a friend of Marcos' son Bongbong. In 2004, Florante stated that his 1983 allegorical song "Upuan", which alluded to Marcos and his military officers, managed to predict his downfall three years before he was deposed in the People Power Revolution.
