= Minsa'y Isang Gamu-gamo =

1976 film directed by Lupita Aquino-Kashiwahara

- Directed by: Lupita Aquino-Kashiwahara (Note: Credited as Lupita A. Concio)
- Written by: Marina Feleo-Gonzales
- Produced by: Cirio H. Santiago; Digna H. Santiago
- Starring: Nora Aunor; Jay Ilagan; Gloria Sevilla; Perla Bautista; Eddie Villamayor
- Cinematography: Jose Batac Jr.
- Edited by: Edgardo Vinarao
- Music by: Restie Umali
- Production company: NV Productions
- Distributed by: Premiere Productions
- Release date: December 25, 1976
- Running time: 110 minutes
- Country: Philippines
- Languages: Filipino; English

Minsa'y Isang Gamu-gamo (English: Once a Moth) is a 1976 Filipino protest drama film directed by Lupita Aquino-Kashiwahara from a story and screenplay written by Marina Feleo-Gonzales. It stars Nora Aunor, Jay Ilagan, Gloria Sevilla, and Perla Bautista. Set near Clark Air Base in Pampanga, the film depicts the lives of two families affected by the American military presence in the Philippines.

Premiering at the 2nd Metro Manila Film Festival, the film won Best Story for Feleo-Gonzales. In 2018, the film was digitally restored by the ABS-CBN Film Restoration Project with a subsequent theatrical premiere at the Cinema One Originals festival of that year.

It was the first important film to address the subject of the American military presence in the Philippines during the Bases era. The film ultimately argues for the closure of these facilities.

== Plot ==
Set in 1969, the film tells the intertwined stories of a couple and their families, both of a lower-middle-class background, living near Clark Air Base in Pampanga.

Corazon de la Cruz is a nurse who plans to go to the United States as a trainee. She hopes to one day get a green card that would allow her to stay in the United States, gain immigrant status, and eventually bring her family there so they can lead a better life. Corazon's mother, Chedeng, and younger brother, Carlito, encourage her. However, her grandfather, Inkong Menciong is critical of her plans, saying that it is a betrayal of their country.

Meanwhile, Bonifacio Santos intends to join the United States Navy so that he can follow his girlfriend, Corazon, to the United States. His mother, Yolanda, a worker in the American Base commissary, attempts to help however she can.

The young couple's dreams begin to break down after Yolanda is wrongfully accused of theft, strip-searched, and humiliated by a Filipino merchandise officer working at the Base. Bonifacio convinces his mother to file charges of "slander by deed" against the officer, and their lawyer files a letter of protest against the American base commander. In response, the merchandise officer, accompanied by two American service personnel, raided Yolanda's store and confiscated all of her merchandise. The goods are eventually returned, but a case against the Base personnel for conducting the illegal raid cannot prosper due to a lack of jurisdiction. A disillusioned Bonifacio no longer wishes to join the US Navy.

On the night of Corazon's farewell party, Carlito is shot dead by a serviceman while flying a red, blue, and white kite near the Base. A group of American officers attend the funeral and offer a donation to the de la Cruz family, adding that the serviceman had thought Carlito was a wild boar. An outraged Corazon yells back at them, "My brother is not a pig!" During the funeral procession, Inkong's memory of World War II is triggered, and the film cuts to historical footage of the Bataan Death March.

The de la Cruz family files a criminal case against the American serviceman. During the hearing, the lawyer representing the American base notifies the court that there is lack of jurisdiction as the corporal responsible for Carlito's death had returned to the United States upon the termination of his tour of duty. The judge dismisses the case. Walking down the steps of the courthouse, the base lawyer attempts to give Corazon an envelope filled with dollars from the corporal, reiterating that he thought her brother was a wild boar. Corazon shows the lawyer a photo of her brother and pushes the envelope back to him.

A motorcycle accident occurs outside the courthouse. Corazon's lawyer pushes through the crowd, exclaiming that there is a nurse. The motorcycle driver's helmet is removed, and it is revealed to be a white man. The film closes with a shot of Corazon looking down at the victim.

== Cast ==
- Nora Aunor as Corazon "Cora" de la Cruz, a nurse who hopes to have a good life in the United States
- Jay Ilagan as Bonifacio "Boni" Santos, Cora's boyfriend who applied to be a service personnel at the US Navy
- Gloria Sevilla as Chedeng de la Cruz, Cora and Carlito's mother who works as a surplus dealer
- Perla Bautista as Yolanda Santos, Boni's mother who works as a commissary at the air base
- Eddie Villamayor as Carlito de la Cruz, Cora's younger brother who was killed by an American soldier
- Paquito Salcedo as Inkong Menciong, Corazon and Carlito's grandfather who survived and witnessed the brutalities of the Bataan Death March
- Luz Fernandez
- Lily Miraflor as Esther, Boni and Yolanda's family friend
- German Moreno as one of Flor's relatives
- Leo Martinez as Travel Agent

== Production ==
=== Development ===
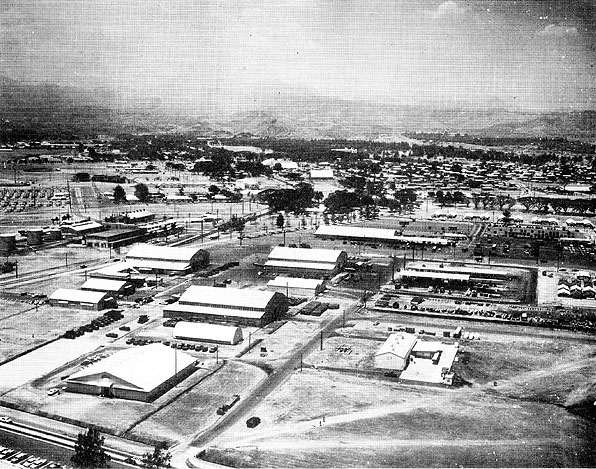
Aerial shot of Clark Air Base in Pampanga in 1967.

Screenwriter Marina Feleo-Gonzales became interested in the political topic in 1971 after seeing a student protest in Rizal Park. The students were running from police who were breaking up the protest, and some student protestors asked Feleo-Gonzales to pretend to be their mother as a form of protection from the police. Producer Digna Santiago and director Lupita Aquino-Kashiwahara were interested in working together on a political film addressing the American military presence in the Philippines. Feleo-Gonzales had previously worked with Aquino-Kashiwahara on the 1975 historical drama Lakambini at Supremo, about Andres Bonifacio and his wife Gregoria de Jesus, which was produced by Armida Siguion-Reyna.

The shooting of Corazon de la Cruz's younger brother Carlito was inspired by two incidents, at Clark Airbase in 1964, and Subic Naval Base in 1969. The Clark Air Base incident was the November 25, 1964 shooting of Filipino 14 year old Rogelio Balagtas at the base target range by off-duty US Airman First Class Larry Cole. The father of Balagtas was given $787 as death compensation. The Subic Naval Base incident was the June 10, 1969 killing of 21 year old Filipino laborer Glicerio Amor by US Navy Gunner's Mate 3/E Michael Moomey, who claimed during his trial that he had mistaken Amor for a Wild Boar when he was hunting at the Boton Valley Rifle and Pistol Range while off duty.

=== Casting ===
Nora Aunor suggested her real-life brother, Eddie Villamayor, for the role of her on-screen brother. Both producer Digna Santiago and director Lupita Aquino-Kashiwahara agreed, the latter saying the casting "gave authenticity to the searing scenes of grief, pain and loss." Aquino-Kashiwara previously directed Villamayor in the 1975 film Alkitrang Dugo, a Filipino adaptation of William Golding's novel Lord of the Flies.

=== Filming ===
The film was shot in Pampanga over 17 days.

== Themes and allusions ==
When the film was made in the 1970s, US military bases were a dominant presence in the Philippines and, in many cases, Filipinos were treated as second-class citizens in our own country. So the film was important in exposing these abuses. Some have called the film anti-American; I viewed it as pro-Filipino.

— Lupita Aquino-Kashiwahara in a 2018 interview

The film has been described by film historian Jose Capino as belonging to the "cinema of decolonization" along with Lino Brocka's PX and Augusto Buenaventura's Sa Kuko ng Agila, all explicitly addressing the issue of the American military presence in the Philippines during the Bases era, as the 1970s saw growing political and legal debates over Philippine sovereignty and the American bases. In the film, Philippine sovereignty is both literally and metaphorically compromised.

In particular, towards the end of the film, Corazon de la Cruz struggles to perform the traditional tinikling dance during her farewell party, and the scene is juxtaposed with her brother flying a red, blue, and white kite (the colors of both the American and the Philippine flag) over Crow Valley near Clark Air Base. At the point where Corazon errs in the tinikling, her leg caught between the bamboo poles, the film cuts to Carlito falling after being shot by an American officer. According to Capino, the film "marks the impossibility–at least during its historical moment–of parity between ex-colonizer and ex-colonized." Carlito dies when his family is busy celebrating Corazon's departure for the United States, so the "juxtaposition of the tinikling and kite scenes forms a rather pedantic image of cultural conflict." After Carlito's death, Inkong Menciong burns the kite, recalling the laws against flag burning during the American colonial period.

There is a parallelism between Carlito and the spit-roasted pig served at the farewell party of Corazon, foreshadowed in the film when Carlito and Inkong watch the pig's slaughter before the party. The defense given by the American personnel is that the shooter mistook Carlito for a wild boar. In response, Corazon asserts the film's famous line: "My brother is not a pig!"

The film makes several historical allusions, including Inkong's memory of the Bataan Death March; the Vietnam War, with Clark Air Base used as a refueling station; and the 1969 Moon landing, with Inkong asking, "Corazon, do they [the Americans] also own the Moon now?"

== Release ==
The film premiered on December 25, 1976, as an entry for the 2nd Metro Manila Film Festival.

=== Restoration ===
In 2018, the film was digitally restored and remastered by the ABS-CBN Film Restoration Project. The restoration was done at the Kantana Film Institute. On the film restoration, director Lupita Aquino-Kashiwahara said:

I'm very pleased that the film has been restored so it can be viewed again, especially by the current generation which wasn't around to experience the events portrayed in the film. It is part of their history, too. Although it's a dramatic movie, many of the scenes are based on real stories, real incidents, real tragedies.

The restored version premiered on October 16, 2018, at Cinema Centenario in Quezon City as part of the Cinema One Originals festival.

=== Home media ===
The film was released on Blu-ray by Kani Releasing in 2023.

== Reception ==
The film received mixed reviews. Nicanor Tiongson, writing for The Philippine Daily Express, praised Nora Aunor's performance and concluded by stating, "flaws notwithstanding, the film stands as one of the best in 1976 Filipino Film Festival and in the year 1976 as well not only because the story and screenplay, and most of all, the point of view of the movie are unequivocally and passionately Filipino."

In 2022, following the recognition of Nora Aunor as a National Artist of the Philippines, Filipino film critic-archivist Jojo Devera wrote that Minsa'y Isang Gamu-Gamo "features what still remains Aunor's most complex film performance" and that her "moving treatment of the material is some of the finest screen time she has ever occupied."

=== Government reaction ===
After the film was released, the U.S. Embassy in Manila requested a copy from Premiere Productions. In 1980, when traveling to the United States, Marina Feleo-Gonzales, the film's writer, was interrogated by immigration officers over the film.

=== Accolades ===
| Year | Award | Category | Nominee(s) | Result |
|---|---|---|---|---|
| 1976 | Metro Manila Film Festival | Best Film | Minsa'y Isang Gamu-gamo | Nominated |
| 1976 | Metro Manila Film Festival | Best Actress | Nora Aunor | Nominated |
| 1976 | Metro Manila Film Festival | Best Story | Marina Feleo-Gonzales | Won |
| 1976 | Metro Manila Film Festival | Best Editing | Edgardo Vinarao | Won |
| 1977 | FAMAS Awards | Best Picture | Minsa'y Isang Gamu-gamo | Won |
| 1977 | FAMAS Awards | Best Director | Lupita Aquino-Kashiwahara | Won |
| 1977 | FAMAS Awards | Best Supporting Actor | Paquito Salcedo | Nominated |
| 1977 | FAMAS Awards | Best Supporting Actress | Perla Bautista | Nominated |
| 1977 | FAMAS Awards | Best Supporting Actress | Gloria Sevilla | Nominated |
| 1977 | FAMAS Awards | Best Screenplay | Marina Feleo-Gonzales | Won |
| 1977 | FAMAS Awards | Best Story | Marina Feleo-Gonzales | Won |
| 1977 | FAMAS Awards | Best Editing | Edgardo Vinarao | Won |
| 1977 | Gaward Urian Awards | Best Picture (Pinakamahusay na Pelikula) | Minsa'y Isang Gamu-gamo | Nominated |
| 1977 | Gaward Urian Awards | Best Direction (Pinakamahusay na Direksyon) | Lupita Aquino-Kashiwahara | Nominated |
| 1977 | Gaward Urian Awards | Best Supporting Actor (Pinakamahusay na Pangalawang Aktor) | Paquito Salcedo | Nominated |
| 1977 | Gaward Urian Awards | Best Screenplay (Pinakamahusay na Dulang Pampelikula) | Marina Feleo-Gonzales | Nominated |

== Adaptations ==
In 1991, the Philippine Educational Theater Association (PETA) staged an adaptation of the film. The stage play also starred Nora Aunor, reprising her role, in her first appearance on stage. The adaptation was written by Rodolfo Vera and directed by Soxy Tapacio. It premiered at the Raha Sulayman Theater in Fort Santiago. The source material was chosen as that year Philippine senators moved to vote against renewing the Military Bases Agreement, effectively removing the presence of the United States military in the country for the time being.
