= Constantino =

Constantino is a Portuguese and Spanish given name and surname. It is derived from Latin Constantinus. Notable people with the name include:

== Given name ==
- Constantino Barza, Brazilian photographer
- Constantino of Braganza (1528–1575), Portuguese nobleman
- Constantino Brumidi (1805–1880), born Costantino Brumidi, Italian-American painter
- Constantino Cajetan (1568–1650), also known as Costantino Gaetani, Italian scholar
- Constantino Chiwenga (born 1956), real name Constantine Chiwenga, Zimbabwean politician
- Constantino Mollitsas (1899–1966), Brazilian association football player
- Constantino de Oliveira Júnior (1968–2026), Brazilian businessman

== Surname ==
- Anthony Constantino (born 2002), Filipino influencer
- Anthony Constantino (politician) (born 1982), American politician and businessman
- Florencio Constantino (1869–1919), Spanish operatic tenor
- Renato Constantino (1919–1999), Filipino historian

== Fictional characters ==
- Phil Constantino, a character in the Jericho television series

== See also ==
- Costantino
- Constantine (disambiguation)
- Constantina (disambiguation)
