= 1977 FAMAS Awards =

24th edition of Filipino movie awards

25th FAMAS Awards
- Date: 1977
- Site: Philippines

Highlights
- Best Picture: Minsa'y isang Gamu-gamo ~ Premiere Productions
- Most awards: Minsa'y isang Gamu-gamo ~ Premiere Productions ( 5 wins)
- Most nominations: Minsa'y isang Gamu-gamo ~ Premiere Productions ( 8 nominations)

The 24th Filipino Academy of Movie Arts and Sciences Awards Night was held in 1977. The event recognized achievements in Filipino films released in 1976.

A Nora Aunor film, Minsa'y isang gamu-gamo from Premiere Productions, was the most nominated with eight nominations and the most awarded with five wins including FAMAS Award for Best Picture and the Best Director for Lupita Aquino-Kashiwahara. However, Aunor was not nominated for this film but she did win for another film, Tatlong taong walang Diyos, her first award from FAMAS after five nominations. Christopher de Leon won his second best actor trophy from FAMAS, making it only the second time a husband and wife had won the major acting awards in FAMAS history.

== Awards ==
=== Major awards ===
Winners are listed first and highlighted with boldface.

Best Picture	Best Director
**Minsa'y isang Gamu-gamo** **— Premier Productions**; Ganito kami noon... Paano kayo ngayon? — Hemisphere; Insiang — Cinemanila; The Rites of May — Cinema Artist; Tatlong taong walang Diyos — NV Productions	**Lupita Aquino-Kashiwahara — Minsa'y isang Gamu-gamo**; Eddie Romero — Ganito Kami Noon... Paano Kayo Ngayon?; Lino Brocka — Insiang; Mike de Leon — The Rites of May; Mario O'Hara — Tatlong taong walang Diyos
Best Actor	Best Actress
**Christopher de Leon — Ganito kami noon... Paano kayo ngayon?**; Rudy Fernandez — Bitayin si... Baby Ama!; Vic Silayan — Ligaw na bulaklak; Dindo Fernando — May langit ang bawat nilikha; Tommy Abuel — Putik ka man... sa alabok Magbalik	**Nora Aunor — Tatlong taong walang Diyos**; Pinky de Leon — Ang daigdig ay isang patak ng luha; Hilda Koronel — Insiang; Pilar Pilapil — May langit ang bawat nilikha; Alma Moreno — Mrs. Eva Fonda, 16
Best Supporting Actor	Best Supporting Actress
**Leopoldo Salcedo — Ganito kami noon... Paano kayo ngayon?**; Dick Israel — Escolta; Mayo 13; Biyernes Ng Hapon!; Ruel Vernal — Insiang; Paquito Salcedo — Minsa'y isang Gamu-gamo; Johnny Delgado — Mrs. Teresa Abad ako po si Bing	**Mona Lisa — Insiang**; Laurice Guillen — Lunes, Martes, Miyerkules, Huwebes, Biyernes, Sabado, Linggo; Perla Bautista — Minsa'y isang Gamu-gamo; Gloria Sevilla — Minsa'y isang Gamu-gamo; Anita Linda — Mrs. Teresa Abad ako po si Bing
Best Child Performer	Best Theme Song
**Niño Muhlach — Kutong Lupa**	**Ernani Cuenco — Bato Sa Buhangin**
Best Screenplay	Best Story
**Marina Feleo-Gonzales — Minsa'y isang Gamu-gamo**	**Marina Feleo-Gonzales — Minsa'y isang Gamu-gamo**
Best Sound	Best Musical Score
**Luis Reyes, Ramon Reyes, Sebastian Sayson — The Rites of May**	**Lutgardo Labad — Ganito Kami Noon, Paano Kayo Ngayon?**
Best Cinematography	Best Production Design
**Ely Cruz, Rody Lacap — The Rites of May**; Arnold Alvaro — Nunal sa Tubig	**Mel Chionglo — The Rites of May**; Laida Lim-Perez, Peque Gallaga — Ganito kami noon... Paano kayo ngayon?
Best Editing	Best Comedy Film
**Edgardo Vinarao — Minsa'y isang gamu-gamo**	**Hoy Mister, Ako Ang Misis Mo**
Best Musical Film	Best Theme Song
**Sinta**	**Ernani Cuenco — Bato sa Buhangin for the movie Bato sa Buhangin**
