= Manila sound =

Philippine popular music genre

- Stylistic origins: Rock and roll; country; kundiman; jazz; disco; funk; Philippine folk rock
- Cultural origins: Mid-1970s, Metro Manila, Philippines
- Typical instruments: Vocals; acoustic guitar; bass guitar; drums; piano
- Derivative forms: Pinoy rock

Other topics
- Worldbeat; Pinoy pop; OPM

Manila sound (Filipino: Tunog ng Maynila) is a music genre in the Philippines that began in the mid-1970s in Metro Manila. The genre flourished and peaked in the mid to late-1970s during the Philippine martial law era and has influenced most of the modern genres in the country by being the forerunner to OPM.

== Characteristics ==
Manila sound is styled as catchy and melodic, with smooth, lightly orchestrated, accessible folk/soft rock, sometimes fused with funk, country, light jazz and disco. However, broadly speaking, it includes quite a number of genres (e.g. pop, vocal music, soft rock, folk pop, disco, soul, Latin jazz, funk etc.), and should therefore be best regarded as a period in Philippine popular music rather than as a single musical style. Manila sound typified the prevailing pop sound of the era, and drew its influences from the singer-songwriter genre of American music during the 1970s. A majority of Manila sound songs were composed in Tagalog or Taglish, although some were also written entirely in English. Sometimes, these songs included "juvenile lyrics", and less frequently, "swardspeak" (aka "gayspeak", i.e. homosexual slang) recast with novelty, comedic or satirical undertones.

== History ==
Manila sound was popularized by the pop rock band Hotdog with their many hit singles, including "Ikaw ang Miss Universe ng Buhay Ko" (You Are the Miss Universe of My Life), "Panaginip" (Dream), "Langit Na Naman" (Heaven Once Again), "O, Lumapit Ka" (Oh, Come Closer), "Bitin sa Iyo" (Left Hanging Over You), and "Dying to Tell You", among others. The term "Manila sound" was used in the early seventies to label pop music by young bands like Hotdog and Cinderella, and young singers who sang in Tagalog/Taglish and English, such as Rico J. Puno and Hadji Alejandro. In 1975, Vicor Music Corporation released the album The Manila Sound.

Manila sound is characterized by catchy melodic phrases. In its later period, Manila sound was dominated by the disco mania that swept the Philippines, led by groups such as VST & Company, the Boyfriends and Hagibis, among others. Alternately described as "the marshmallow sound", Manila sound generated a string of calculated radio hits by artists such as Cinderella, Apolinario Mabini Hiking Society, Florante, Rico J. Puno, Sharon Cuneta, and many others.

Manila sound's unprecedented and meteoric appeal provided viability to a Philippine recording industry that until then had relied on cover versions and imitation of foreign hits to entice consumers. Popular music in the 1970s was disseminated and consumed almost exclusively through AM and later also FM radio, which also measured, as did record sales, which songs were popular. During that period, MTV and music video formats were nearly non-existent (MTV started airing music videos only in 1981) and television was not really considered the means by which record producers and music artists marketed their songs. Popular music was listened to (on the radio) and not viewed (on television), and consequently, many musicians, apart from their band names, were not generally known to listeners. Furthermore, the Internet had not yet been developed and consequently, modern-day promotional mechanisms like streaming formats or YouTube videos, were non-existent.

In the genre's later years, lyrics skewed towards camp humor and parody eventually caused Manila sound to devolve into an explicitly theatrical, if not juvenile, sub-genre, as exemplified by Hagibis (a mimicry of the Village People) and the Boyfriends, until it diminished in the late 1970s under a wave of dance-oriented hits from American films such as Saturday Night Fever, Grease and Footloose. By the early 1980s, disco had waned in popularity, mirroring disco's serious backlash and decline that occurred earlier in the United States. Moreover, musical tastes had changed, moving away from soft rock into newer musical forms, particularly adult contemporary, and to a lesser extent punk rock and new wave, and radio airplay reflected these changes.

Manila sound's laid-back and unpretentious musical style gave way to the intricate, multi-layered, and sometimes symphonic arrangements of OPM (Original Pilipino Music) that dominated popular, radio-friendly Philippine music starting in the late 1970s until the early 2000s. OPM, spawned initially or heavily influenced by the annual Metro Manila Popular Music Festival, emerged as the radio favorites. Two of OPM's early and highly successful releases were the songs "Anak" by folk rock singer-songwriter Freddie Aguilar, along with "Kay Ganda ng Ating Musika" by pianist/composer/conductor Ryan Cayabyab. Both songs produced a new generation of Original Pilipino Music represented by artists such as Kuh Ledesma, Zsa Zsa Padilla, Basil Valdez, Gary Valenciano, Martin Nievera and later, Regine Velasquez.

== Resurgence ==
In 2005, the Filipino funk band Kala appeared in the music scene with its retro-sounding first single, "Jeepney", which became a hit. According to the Philippine Inquirer, the band revived and redefined the Manila sound genre through their funk-rock-hip music. Rene Garcia (co-founder of the band Hotdog) praised Kala by "carrying out the funky groove of the 1970s with the sounds of today". The band also took part in the tribute album, Hopia Mani Popcorn. Kala's funky cover version of VST and Co.'s "Rock Baby Rock" became a hit.

The following year, the Apo Hiking Society relaunched their retro hits in a double-CD package, coupled with reinterpretations of each by Manila's young alternative bands. Riding on the appeal of this revival, The Best of Manila Sound: Hopia Mani Popcorn was released the same year, featuring interpretations of a number of classic Manila sound hits. The Best of Manila Sound: Hopia Mani Popcorn 2 followed in 2008.

Over the years since Manila sound's decline, many performers have released cover versions of the more popular songs of this genre, indicating its continuing appeal to new generations of listeners. These artists and their covers include Barbie's Cradle ("Langit Na Naman"), Donna Cruz ("Boy"), Erik Santos ("Bitin sa Iyo"), Freestyle ("Bakit Ba Ganyan"), Gary Valenciano ("Manila"), Janno Gibbs ("Binibini", "Ipagpatawad"), Jolina Magdangal ("T.L. Ako sa Iyo"), Mark Bautista ("Beh Buti Nga" (featuring Anne Curtis)), Manilyn Reynes ("Mr. Disco", "Shake It Baby", "Nais Kong Malaman Mo" (with Keempee de Leon)), Prettier Than Pink ("Ang Boyfriend Kong Baduy"), Piolo Pascual ("Ms. Universe"), Sarah Geronimo ("Pers Lab"), Sheryn Regis ("Bongga Ka Day"), Sitti Navarro ("Samba Song"), Tina Paner ("Sana"), Vina Morales ("Pers Lab"), and White Lies ("First Love Never Dies").

== Artists ==
- Hotdog
- VST and Company
- Boyfriends
- Cinderella
- APO Hiking Society
- Sampaguita
- Hagibis
- Rey Valera
- Sharon Cuneta
- Florante
- Rico J. Puno
- Tito, Vic & Joey
- Asin
- Celeste Legaspi
- Jose Mari Chan
- Juan Dela Cruz Band
- Ella del Rosario
- Fred Panopio
- Junior
- Mike Hanopol
- Yoyoy Villame
