= Bato sa Buhangin =

1976 romantic drama film by Pablo Santiago

- Theatrical release poster
- Directed by: Pablo Santiago
- Screenplay by: Fred Navarro
- Story by: Herminio "Butch" Bautista
- Produced by: FPJ
- Starring: Fernando Poe Jr.; Vilma Santos
- Cinematography: Sergio Lobo
- Edited by: Augusto Salvador
- Music by: Ernani Cuenco
- Production company: FPJ Productions
- Distributed by: FPJ Productions
- Release date: August 13, 1976
- Country: Philippines
- Language: Filipino

Bato sa Buhangin is a 1976 Filipino romantic drama film directed by Pablo Santiago and written by Fred Navarro from a story by Herminio Bautista. It stars Fernando Poe Jr. and Vilma Santos in their second on-screen team up following the success of Batya't Palu-palo (1974). The film was released by FPJ Productions on August 13, 1976.

== Plot ==
An intriguing revelation from a fortune teller leaves the spoiled Bamba (Vilma Santos) restless to meet her destined lover. One day, the anxious Bamba comes across the humble taxi driver Rafael (Fernando Poe Jr.) after their vehicles collide on the street. To make up for Bamba’s blunder, Bamba’s father offers the poor Rafael to work as his daughter’s bodyguard. Being the snotty brat she is, Bamba punishes Rafael by bossing him around and embarrassing him in front of her friends. Through it all, however, Bamba suddenly finds herself irresistibly falling in love with Rafael — the one man who has patiently put up with all her mischief. The only hurdle to Bamba and Rafael’s love story, though, is the secret Bamba has been keeping from everybody all her life – even to her beloved Rafael. Will this secret ruin the chance for Bamba to be with her fated partner?

== Cast and characters ==
Main cast

- Fernando Poe Jr. as Rafael "Paeng" Longalong
- Vilma Santos as Barbara "Bamba" Montinola

Supporting cast

- Dencio Padilla as Lucio
- Robert Talabis as Joseph
- Millie Mercado as Rose
- Connie Angeles as Gigi
- Jun Soler as Gil
- Jumbo Salvador as Teddy
- Phillip Salvador as Phil
- Yvonne Salcedo as Gelyn
- Tina Monasterio as Lala
- Rowell Santiago as Rowell
- Fred Montilla as Mr. Montinola
- Nello Nayo as Dr. Vergara
- Imelda Ilanan as Lorna
- Romy Diaz as Boy Hernandez
- Mary Walter as Impong Sela
- Alfonso Carvajal as Asst. Fiscal Magtanggol
- Naty Hernando as The Taxi Operator
- Ely Roque as The False Fortune Teller
- Resty Samuel as The Motorcycle Policeman
- Ruby Rose as Ms. San Diego, the private nurse

== Music ==
The film's theme was written specifically for the film by Ernani Cuenco and Snaffu Rigor and performed by the latter's band, Cinderella.

== Accolades ==
Award-giving body	Category	Recipient	Result	Source
1977 FAMAS Awards	Best Theme Song	Ernani Cuenco	Won	
