= Kala (band) =

Filipino rock band

KALA
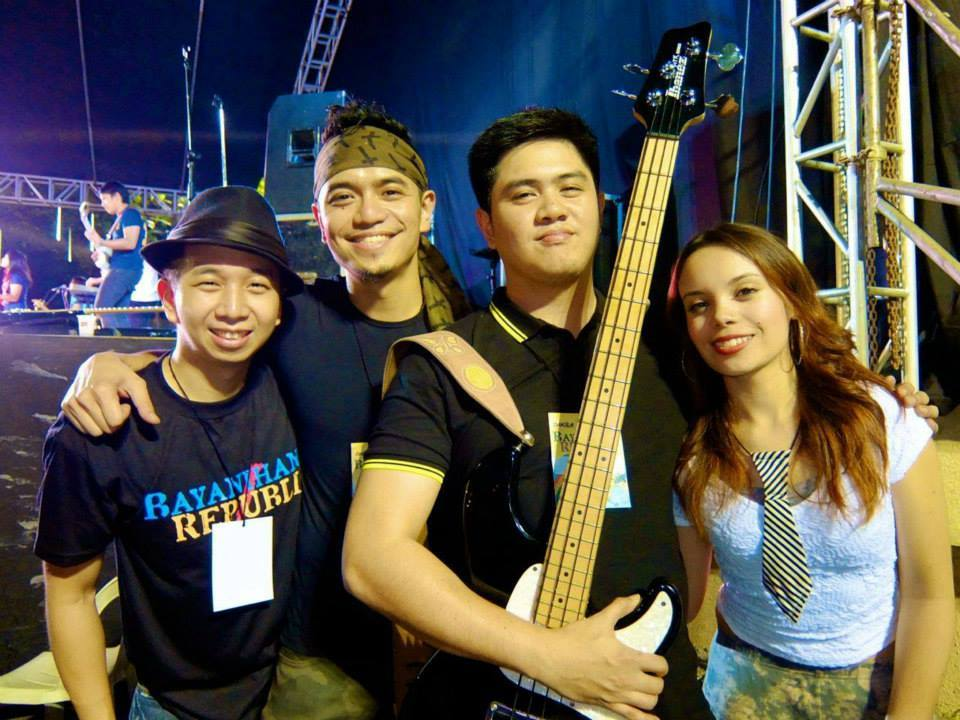
- from left to right: Voopee Elviña, Brian Tanchanco, Raymond Daylo and Jade Justine from KALA in Bayanihan Republic 2013

Background information
- Origin: Makati City, Philippines
- Genres: Funk; nu-disco; Manila sound; acid jazz; electronic; rock
- Years active: 2004–2008, 2010–present
- Labels: Sony BMG, Believe Digital, flat FIVE Records
- Members: Brian Tanchanco; JP Tanchanco; Jade Justine; Andrew Contreras
- Past members: Voopee Elviña (deceased); Raymond Daylo; Lyle Pasco; William Gabaldon; Mike Grape (deceased)
- Website: kalafunk.com

Kala (stylized in all caps) is a Filipino band that blends funk, nu-disco, acid jazz, electronic and rock music. Its members are Brian Tanchanco, JP Tanchanco, Jade Justine, and Andrew Contreras.

== History ==
KALA's first full-length album came on the music scene in 2005 with their debut album under Sony BMG entitled Manila High. The group is most noted for its hit single “Jeepney” and is credited with the resurgence of a distinct and defining genre of Filipino music known as “Manila sound”. The name “Kala” originates from the original members’ college cake-making venture called the “Kala Cake Project”.

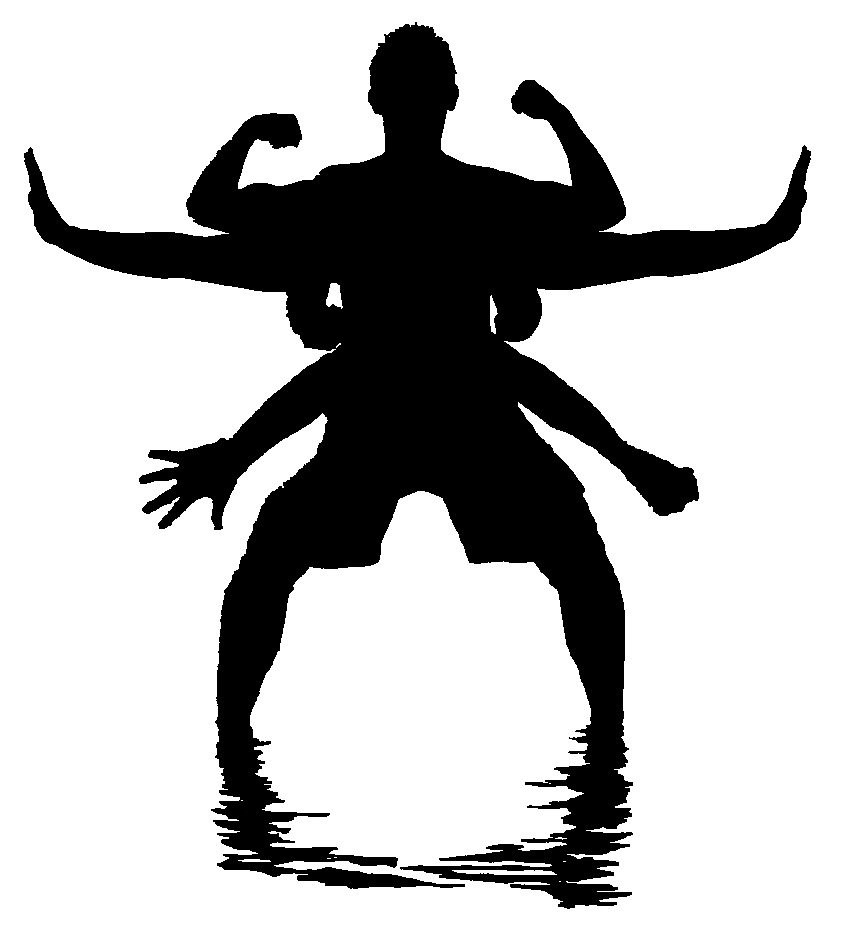
Kalaman

In 2008, KALA underwent a self-imposed hiatus following the departures of bassist Lyle Pasco, lead guitarist JP Tanchanco and lead vocalist Mike Grape from the band.

In 2011, KALA resurfaced with new members Jade Justine and Voopee Elviña.

Following their come back, KALA performed in Jack Daniel's third Philippine tour entitled “Jack Daniel’s On Stage: Scouting Gigs” on November 22, 2013.

Lead guitarist Voopee Elviña died on December 4, 2015, after a battle with nasopharyngeal cancer.

=== KALAMAN ===
During a summer vacation in Boracay last 2004, some of the old band members had a picture posing in silhouette against the sunset. Various poses were made which represented each of the band members. Brian decided to combine prominent elements of each pose in order to blend it in one unifying image. This became the official logo of KALA. It represents convergence and harmony with the sharing of friendship, talents and passion from each of the band members.

== Advocacy ==
In 2004, KALA started performing for Rock Ed Philippines, a nationwide volunteer group that offers alternative education to underprivileged Filipino youth through art, music, poetry, and the like. In the same year, the band released an EP entitled “RockEdition: For the Benefit of the Filipino Youth” by way of support for the UN's “Millennium Development Goals” and “Global Call to Action Against Poverty.”

In 2011, KALA performed for Rock Ed once again in their “Rock the Riles: Rocking for Education” tour.

== Awards and nominations ==
Year	Award giving body	Category	Nominated work	Results
2006	MTV Philippines	Rising Star of the Month	—	Won
2006	NU Rock Awards	Best New Artist	—	Nominated
2007	20th Awit Awards	Best Performance by a New Group Recording Artist	—	Won
2007	20th Awit Awards	Favorite New Group Artist	—	Won
2007	20th Awit Awards	People’s Choice Favorite Group	"Jeepney"	Won
2007	20th Awit Awards	People’s Choice Favorite New Group	"Manila High"	Won
2007	MYX Music Awards	Favorite New Artist	—	Won
2008	GMMSF Box-Office Entertainment Awards	Most Promising Recording Group	—	Won

== Band members ==
=== Current members ===
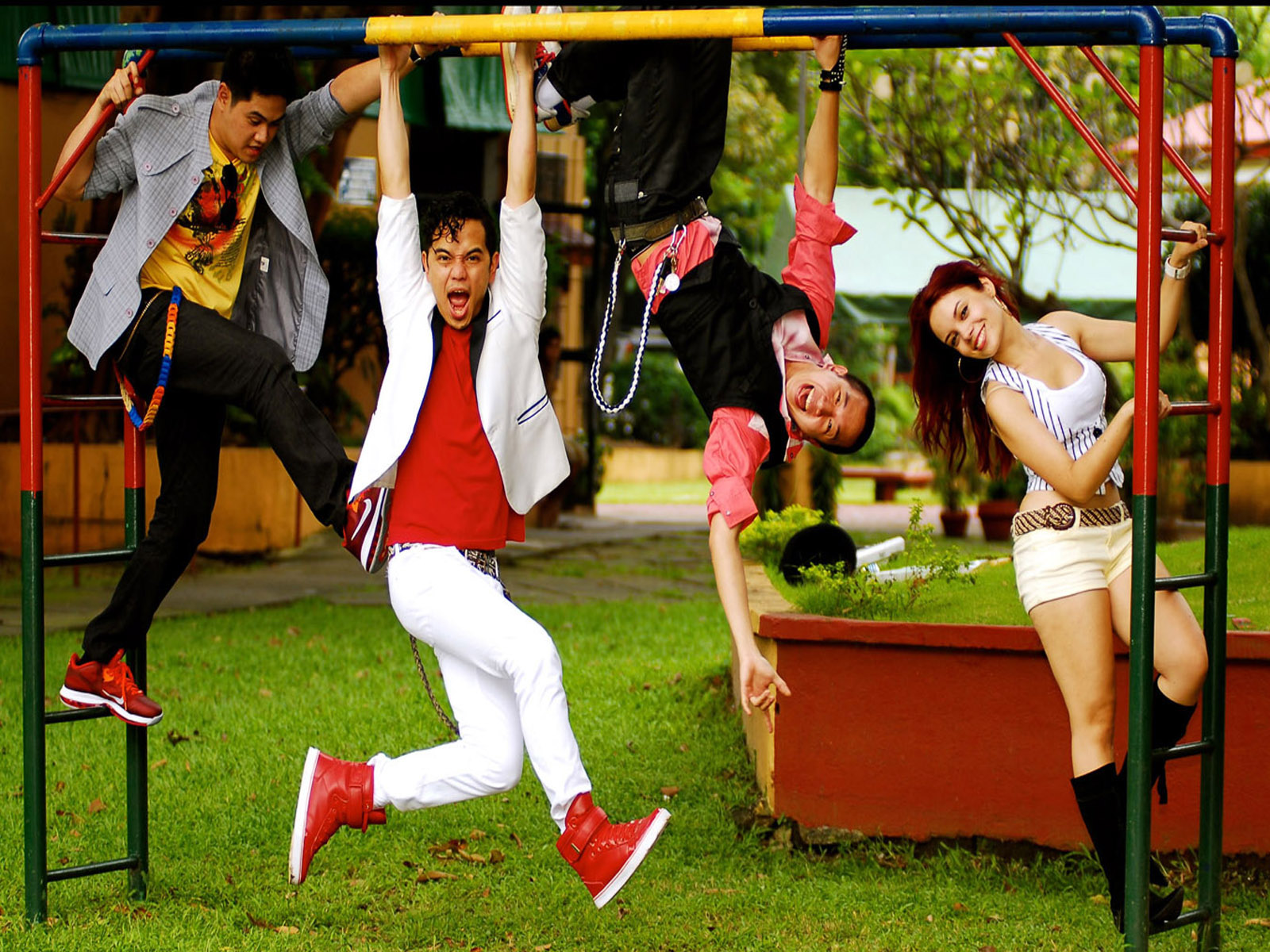
Playground photo shoot

- Brian Tanchanco: lead vocals, keytar, keyboards, synths (2004-2008; 2010–present)
- JP Tanchanco: lead guitar (2004-2008; 2015–present)
- Jade Justine: bass guitar (2010–present)
- Andrew Contreras: drums (2015–present)

=== Former members ===
- Voopee Elviña: lead guitar, backup vocals (2010–2015, deceased)
- Raymond Daylo: drums, backup vocals (2004-2008; 2010–2015)
- Lyle Pasco: bass guitar (2005-2008)
- William Gabaldon: bass guitar (2004-2005)
- Mike Grape: lead vocals (2004-2008; 2010-2012, deceased)

== Discography ==
=== Future Disco (2013) ===
1. Touch Me Kiss Me
2. Ella Villamor
3. Dr. Strange
4. Tipar
5. Imaginary Lucy
6. Future Disco
7. Libot
8. The Race
9. Pag Ikot
10. Feel My Love

=== Manila High (2005) ===
1. Pulis Pangkalawakan
2. Parapap
3. Jeepney
4. Sync of 8
5. South Side
6. Piso Pisong Paraiso
7. Manila High
8. Salamin
9. Bakbakan Na
10. Tubero
11. Weather Forecast
12. Jeepney (Nude Mix)

=== RockEdition: For the Benefit of the Filipino Youth (2004) ===
1. Pulis Pangkalawakan
2. Pira Pirasong Paraiso
3. Southside
4. Salamin
5. Bakbakan Na

== Collaborations ==
- The Best of Manila Sound: Hopia Mani Popcorn (Viva Records, 2006)
- Environmentally Sound: A Select Anthology of Songs Inspired by the Earth (World Wide Fund for Nature, 2006)
- Pinoy Soul Movement (Warner Music Philippines, 2007)
