= Perla Bautista =

Filipino actress

- Born: Perla Marcial Bautista; 18 February 1940 (age 86); Manila, Philippines
- Occupation: Actress
- Years active: 1957–present

Perla Marcial Bautista (born February 18, 1940) is a Filipino actress whose career span more than six decades. She began her career playing minor roles in the late 1950s until she became a top-billed actress in the 1960s. She is known for portraying maternal roles in the succeeding decades and has since received five FAMAS Awards and a Gawad Urian.

== Career ==
Bautista, at the age of 17, joined LVN Pictures together with teenage stars such as Bernard Bonnin, Luz Valdez, Marita Zobel and Hector Reyes. She was formally introduced in the movie Eddie, Junior Detective (1958). She appeared such films like Malvarosa (1958), Casa Grande (1958), Venganza (1958), Black Beauty (1960) with Charito Solis, and Kilabot sa Barilan (1960) starring Fernando Poe Jr.

The first independent outfit Tagalog Ilang Ilang Productions under the late Atty. Espiridion Laxa built up the unique loveteam of Joseph Estrada-Perla Bautista in their first film together Markang Rehas (1962), both won the FAMAS best actor and best actress trophies.

Bautista did films like De Colores (1968) starring Joseph Estrada, Amalia Fuentes, and Leopoldo Salcedo, and Crush Ko Si Sir (1971) starring Dante Rivero, Hilda Koronel and Jay Ilagan. She played the mother of Nora Aunor in the classic film Minsa'y Isang Gamu-gamo (1976).

She starred in the film Grandpa Is Dead (2009) with Elizabeth Oropesa, Roderick Paulate and Manilyn Reynes, directed by Soxy Topacio. Bautista played the title role in the independent film Hermana Fausta (2009). She played the lead role in Ang Maestra, about a retired teacher with Alzheimer's disease and starred in the horror film Huling Habilin, about an old woman's ghost seeking justice.

She was cast in the television series Apoy sa Dagat starring Piolo Pascual, Diether Ocampo, and Angelica Panganiban.

== Personal life ==
She is the fifth of eight children of Vicente Bautista and Carmen Marcial. She finished secondary education at the Torres High School and enrolled in Commerce at the Lyceum of the Philippines. She has one son, Jude.

== Filmography ==
=== Film ===
Year	Title	Role(s)
1958	Eddie, Junior Detective	
1958	Malvarosa	Melanio's Woman #2
1960	Kilabot sa Barilan	
1962	Markang Rehas	
1967	Maruja?	
1968	De Colores	
1971	Wait for Me	Rosie Rosales
1976	Babae... Sa Likod ng Salamin	
1976	Minsa'y Isang Gamu-gamo	Yolanda Santos
1978	Bakekang	
1980	Nang Bumuka ang Sampaguita	
1981	Kumander Alibasbas	
1981	San Basilio	Dolor
1982	Get My Son Dead or Alive	Martha Parrraguas
1983	Paano Ba ang Mangarap?	Aling Ising
1984	Hindi Mo Ako Kayang Tapakan	Dolores
1984	Bulaklak sa City Jail	Viring
1986	Bukas... Uulan ng Bala	Aling Anselma
1987	Anak ng Lupa	Nana Tale
1988	Anak ng Cabron	
1988	Puso sa Puso	
1988	Alega Gang: Public Enemy No.1 of Cebu	
1988	Sa Akin Pa Rin ang Bukas	Aling Norma
1988	Minsan Pa, Mahalin Mo Ako	
1989	Bilangin ang Bituin sa Langit	Mercedes "Cedes" Santos
1989	Carnap King? (The Randy Padilla Story)	Mama Lita
1990	Dyesebel	Mother of Dyesebel
1990	Ikasa Mo, Ipuputok Ko!	Tinay
1990	Gumapang Ka sa Lusak	
1990	Bad Boy	Aling Monang
1990	Andrea, Paano Ba ang Maging Isang Ina?	
1991	Noel Juico, 16: Batang Kriminal	Lola Meding
1992	Working Students	Aling Rosa
1994	The Elsa Castillo Story... Ang Katotohanan	Mother of Elsie
1994	Bawal Na Gamot	
1994	The Fatima Buen Story	Corazon
1994	Iukit Mo sa Bala	Noemi's mother
1994	Lipa Arandia Massacre: Lord, Deliver Us from Evil	Crispina
1994	Pedrito Masangkay: Walang Bakas na Iniwan	Caridad Ventura
1994	Iligpit si Victor Sarraza	Mrs. Sarraza
1995	Lt. Rolito Reynoso: Mahirap Patayin	Mother of Lito
1995	Tomboy: The Movie	Madam X
1995	Hanggang sa Huling Bala	Kapitana
1996	Cara y Cruz: Walang Sinasanto	Aling Ason
1996	Tubusin Mo ng Bala ang Puso Ko	Kate's mother
1998	Balasubas	Brando's Mother
2000	'Di Ko Kayang Tanggapin	Lola Tuding
2000	Sagot Kita: Mula Ulo Hanggang Paa	Maring
2001	Kaaway Hanggang Hukay	Mamang
2001	Dugong Aso: Mabuting Kaibigan, Masamang Kaaway	Tiya Lumen
2002	Jologs	Ruben's grandmother
2006	TxT	Lola Lilia
2007	Ouija	Lagring
2008	Anak ng Kumander	Aling Marcela
2008	Adela	Glenda
2009	When I Met U	Eva
2009	Grandpa Is Dead	
2011	Manila Kingpin: The Asiong Salonga Story	Maria Salonga
2011	Shake, Rattle & Roll 13	Old woman
2013	She's the One	
2014	Shake, Rattle & Roll XV	Lola Amah Choleng (segment: Ulam)
2015	Chain Mail	Grandma of Aileen and Sandra
2015	Heneral Luna	Trinidad Aguinaldo
2015	Honor Thy Father	Nanang
2016	Kabisera	
2017	Tatlong Bibe	Auring
2018	Goyo: The Boy General	Doña Trinidad Aguinaldo
2020	Suarez: The Healing Priest	Mysterious candle vendor

=== Television ===
Year	Title	Role
1985–1987	Lovingly Yours, Helen	
1987	Regal Shocker: Kasal sa Hukay	
1988	Regal Shocker: Taong Paniki	Esther
1988	Regal Shocker: Susunod Kang Mamamatay!	Belinda
1988	Coney Reyes on Camera	
1989	Regal Shocker: Nagbabagang Mata	Paula
1993	Noli Me Tangere	Tia Isabel
1995	GMA Telecine Specials	
1998	Maalaala Mo Kaya: Talaarawan	
1999–2001	Marinella	Mameng Santiago
2000	Maalaala Mo Kaya: Postcard	Recurring Role
2000–2002	Pangako Sa 'Yo	Chayong De Jesus
2001–2003	Recuerdo de Amor	Carlotta / Ninang
2001	!Oka Tokat: Forest Fright	old Eleanor
2002	Bituin	Ofelia
2002	Kay Tagal Kang Hinintay	Lucila Guinto
2003–2004	Walang Hanggan	Recurring Role
2004	Te Amo, Maging Sino Ka Man	Catalina
2004	Spirits	Nanang
2005	Love to Love: Wish Upon A Jar	Recurring Role
2006	Wansapanataym: Ang Alamat Ng Pinya	Recurring Role
2006	Agawin Mo Man ang Lahat	Meding Dueñas
2007	Maalaala Mo Kaya: Blue Rose	Recurring Role
2007	Mga Kuwento ni Lola Basyang: Ang Mahiwagang Biyulin	Tandang Epang
2007	Ysabella	Guadalupe "Lupe" Amarillo
2008	Maalaala Mo Kaya: Salamin	Recurring Role
2009	Sugat ng Kahapon	Salve
2009	Maalaala Mo Kaya: Diary	Recurring Role
2009	The Wedding	Greta
2009–2010	Mars Ravelo's Darna	Mirren
2010	5 Star Specials: Putik	Recurring Role
2010	Your Song Presents: Andi	Recurring Role
2010	Star Confessions	Flocerpida
2010	Maalaala Mo Kaya: Basura	Recurring Role
2010	Maalaala Mo Kaya: Pera	Recurring Role
2011	Alakdana	Ising Perez
2011	Iglot	Ester
2011	Maalaala Mo Kaya: Birth Certificate	Conchita
2011	Wansapanataym: Apir Disapir	Rosario
2011	Wansapanataym: Wan Tru Lab	Recurring Role
2011	Rod Santiago's The Sisters	Consuelo
2011–2012	Amaya	Uray Gurang
2012	Regal Shocker Presents: Perya	Recurring Role
2012	Nandito Ako	Rosa
2012	Maria la del Barrio	Tita
2012	Hiram na Puso	Minda
2012	Oka2kat	Aring
2012	Maalaala Mo Kaya: Singsing	Recurring Role
2012	Maalaala Mo Kaya: Korona	Recurring Role
2012	Wansapanataym: Mini-Mimi	Paul's grandmother
2012	Wansapanataym: Yaya Yaya Puto Maya	Lyn
2013	Apoy sa Dagat	Lornita Mirasol
2013	My Little Juan	Sunshine Domingo
2013	Maalaala Mo Kaya: Elevator	Flor
2013	Wansapanataym: The Christmas Visitor	Joey's mother
2014	Moon of Desire	Amor Martinez
2014	Maalaala Mo Kaya: Tutong	Lola Ina
2015	Wansapanataym: Once Upon a Lusis	Dolores
2015	Magpakailanman: Ang Lolang Mapagbiro (The Josefina Arellano Story)	Lola Amparing
2015	Ipaglaban Mo: Sinirang Tiwala	Carrie's mother
2015	Maynila: Nobody's Princess	Lola Hilda
2015	Karelasyon: Mrs. Husband	Sonia
2015	Love Hotline: Ang Barumbadong Anak	Lourdes
2015	Maalaala Mo Kaya: Sinigang	Nanay
2015	All of Me	Estrella
2015	Ipaglaban Mo!: Buhay Mo o Buhay Ko?	Loleng
2015	Magpakailanman: Ang Batang Isinilang sa Bilangguan (The Paul Oliver Pili Story)	Percy
2016	Karelasyon: Pag-ibig na Nakatadhana	Mely
2016	Maalaala Mo Kaya: Bangketa	Soledad
2017	A Love to Last	Carla "Mameng" Agoncillo
2018	Maynila: My Lolo's Wish	Lola Rustica
2018	Eat Bulaga's Lenten Special: Haligi ng Pangarap	Lina
2018	Maynila: Millennial Lolas	Lola Vicky
2018	Ika-5 Utos	Aurora Aquino
2018–2019	Precious Hearts Romances Presents: Los Bastardos	Marta Evangelista
2019–2020	Pamilya Ko	Caridad "Caring" Potenciano-Mabunga
2025–2026	FPJ's Batang Quiapo	Lola Florie Garcia
2026	Eat Bulaga's Lenten Special: The CEO	Elizabeth Villareal-Tenorio

== Awards and nominations ==
Year	Category	Award	Nominated work	Result
1963	Best Actress	FAMAS Award	Markang Rehas (1962)	Won
1964	Best Actress	FAMAS Award	Patapon (1963)	Nominated
1966	Best Actress	FAMAS Award	Labanang Lalake! (1965)	Nominated
1969	Best Actress	FAMAS Award	De Colores (1968)	Nominated
1977	Best Supporting Actress	FAMAS Award	Minsa'y Isang Gamu-gamo (1976)	Nominated
1980	Best Supporting Actress	FAMAS Award	Ang Alamat ni Julian Makabayan (1979)	Won
1981	Best Supporting Actress	FAMAS Award	Nang Bumuka ang Sampaguita (1980)	Won
1982	Best Supporting Actress	Gawad Urian Award	Kumander Alibasbas (1981)	Nominated
1982	Best Actress	FAMAS Award	Kumander Alibasbas (1981)	Nominated
1983	Best Supporting Actress	FAMAS Award	In This Corner (1982)	Nominated
1985	Best Supporting Actress	Gawad Urian Award	Bulaklak sa City Jail (1984)	Nominated
1985	Best Supporting Actress	FAMAS Award	Bulaklak sa City Jail (1984)	Won
1987	Best Supporting Actress	Gawad Urian Award	Bagong Hari (1986)	Nominated
1989	Best Supporting Actress	FAMAS Award	Anak ng Cabron (1988)	Nominated
1989	Best Supporting Actress	Gawad Urian Award	Anak ng Cabron (1988)	Won
2000	Life Achievement Award	PMPC Star Awards for Movies	Herself	Won
2011	Best Actress	9th Gawad Tanglaw Awards	Presa	Won
