= Rocksteddy =

Filipino rock band

- Origin: Metro Manila, Philippines
- Genres: Pinoy rock; alternative rock; pop-punk
- Years active: 2003–present
- Labels: PolyEast; Universal; 12 Stone
- Members: Teddy Corpuz; Jeff Cucullo; Christian Sindico; Juven Pelingon
- Past members: Howie Ramos; Alfie Guttierez
- Website: Official site

Rocksteddy is a Filipino rock band signed to 12 Stone Records.

== History and singles ==
Formerly known as Acoustic Faith, Rocksteddy was founded in March 2003 by fellow church members, a trio of Christian rockers including singer Teddy Corpuz, drummer Jeff Cucullo, and rhythm guitar Howie Ramos. In 2005, they decided to drop the Christian lyricism and acoustic style and turned to alternative rock. Corpuz however did not drop the spoken word element of their former music, which became the signature sound of Rocksteddy. The band opened 2006 with the release of their debut album Tsubtsatagilidakeyn. It features the hits "Lagi Mo Na Lang Akong Dinededma," "Gising Na," and the Close Up single "Smile at Me." They also provided the theme song, "Superhero," for the ABS-CBN fantasy show Super Inggo and contributed to the "Kami nAPO Muna: Tribute to the APO Hiking Society" album with a cover of "Blue Jeans". They became part of the Manila sound tribute album, "Hopia, Mani, Popcorn", with their rendition of the Juan dela Cruz song, "No Touch".

Teddy Corpuz is a cousin of TV reporter, host and radio anchor Niña Corpuz-Rodriguez.

In 2007, the band launched their second album with their single, "Break Na Tayo".

In 2009, Rocksteddy launched their third album, Ayos Lang Ako, now under PolyEast Records, with their single "Boy Kulot".

In 2013, Rocksteddy released Instadramatic, now with Universal Records alongside their single, "Matutunan Mo Rin", the concept of the album cover was a similar to the Instagram logo.

In 2014, Rocksteddy launched their fourth album Kinagat Ng Seven Lions, via Universal Records, with their new single "Sa Panaginip".

== Band members ==
=== Current ===
- Teddy Corpuz – lead vocals
- Jeff Cucullo – drums, percussion
- Christian Sindico – bass guitar, backing vocals
- Juven Pelingon – lead guitars, rhythm guitar

=== Former ===
- Howie Ramos – rhythm guitar & backup vocals
- Alfie Guttierez – drums

== Discography ==
Tsubtsatagilidakeyn is Rocksteddy's debut album released on January 6, 2006 which made a hit out of "Lagi Mo Na Lang Akong Dinededma". Tsubtsatagilidakeyn is a popular phrase Filipino children would blurt out playing 'Teks', a card game where the correct side of a flipped card wins. In the same year, Rocksteddy was also invited to join the tribute album Kami nAPO muna doing their version of Apo Hiking Society's "Blue Jeans". Another tribute album followed, The Best of Manila Sound: Hopia Mani Popcorn, this time they did "No Touch" by the Juan de la Cruz Band.

In 2007, Rocksteddy released EP album – dubbed a "maxi" album by Corpuz — Patipatopanabla, which contained their hit songs from different projects. It includes “Superhero”, the TV soundtrack to ABS-CBN's series Super Inggo, starring Makisig Morales. The album also included the band's music videos.

Rocksteddy returned with a new album in 2008 with Ayos Lang Ako, which they recorded at musician Vic Mercado's (formerly of band Bamboo) house and co-produced with Lean Ansing, guitarist of metalcore band Slapshock.

While working on their fourth album, Rocksteddy released the single "Matutuhan Mo Rin", a love song about a guy who is willing to wait for a girl to feel the same for him. Corpuz directed its music video which stars actors Jason Abalos and Maan Marquez.

== Albums ==
=== Studio albums ===
- Tsubtsatagilidakeyn (released by 12 Stone and Sony Music on January 26, 2006)
- Patipatopanabla (released by 12 Stone and Sony Music in 2007)
- Ayos Lang Ako (released by 12 Stone and PolyEast Records in 2008)
- Kinagat Ng Seven Lions (released by 12 Stone and Universal Records in 2014)

=== EPs ===
- Instadramatic (released by 12 Stone and Universal Records in 2013)

=== Collaborations ===
- Kami nAPO Muna (Universal Records, 2006)
- The Best Of Manila Sound: Hopia Mani Popcorn (Viva Records, 2006)
- 60 Taon Ng Musika At Soap Opera (Star Music, 2010)
- I-Star 15: The Best Of Alternative & Rock Songs (Star Music, 2010)

=== Music videos and singles ===
- Lagi Mo Na Lang Akong Dinededma (first funny music video)
- Gising Na
- Blue Jeans (Original by APO; taken from the tribute compilation album Kami nAPO muna)
- Superhero (Super Inggo TV soundtrack)
- Magpakailanman
- No Touch (Original by Mike Hanopol; taken from the tribute compilation album The Best of Manila Sound: Hopia Mani Popcorn Directed by: Topel Lee)
- Bale wala
- Wag na lang
- Kung wala na tayo
- Tara
- Playing safe
- Impossible
- Super nova
- Non-stop Summer
- Break na Tayo
- Kung Fu Fighting feat. Gloc 9 (Kung Fu Kids TV soundtrack)
- Ka-Blog (Theme from Ka-Blog TV Show)
- Boy Kulot (second funny music video)
- Smile At Me (Close up Commercial)
- Leslie
- Skulin Bukulin
- Love is Your Bullet
- Matutuhan Mo Rin
- Sama-Sama
- Right By Your Side
- Pagkakataon
- Drown
- Sa Panaginip
- Katol
- U.T.I (Umasa Tapos Iniwan) (2017)
- No Label (2019)

== Styles and influences ==
Rocksteddy is classified under the hard rock, pop punk and alternative rock genres. Their music contains influences from metal, post-grunge, and punk rock, on 2015 single "Katol" they use rapping.

== Other projects ==
Rocksteddy's lead singer Teddy Corpuz is also an actor and host, currently seen in ABS-CBN's hit noontime show “It's Showtime”. He has appeared in commercials for Globe and TV shows such as GMA's “Sugo” and TV5's “Shock Attack”. Corpuz is also an actor on a Holy Week Drama Special on It's Showtime held every Holy Week of every year together with his fellow Itchyworms band member long time best friend Jugs Jugueta also on the drama special, he both and Jugs are also hosted a Holy Week Public Service Documentary Special of Its Showtime in 2018.

== Awards and nominations ==
Year	Award giving body	Category	Nominated work	Results
2006	NU Rock Awards	Best New Artist	—N/a	Nominated
2008	Awit Awards	Music Video of the Year	"Break na Tayo"	Nominated
2008	Awit Awards	Music Video of the Year (People's Choice Award)	"Break na Tayo"	Nominated
