= Constantina (disambiguation) =

Constantina is the feminine form of Constantine. It may refer to:

- Constantina, a Byzantine saint, the eldest daughter of Roman Emperor Constantine I and his second wife Fausta
- Constantina (empress), Byzantine empress, daughter of Tiberius II and wife of Maurice
- Constantina, Brazil, a Brazilian municipality in Rio Grande do Sul
- Constantina, Seville, a Spanish municipality in the province of Seville.
- Constantina (Osrhoene), a Roman/Byzantine city in northern Mesopotamia

== See also ==
- Constantine (disambiguation)
