= The Best of Manila Sound: Hopia Mani Popcorn 2 =

Compilation album by Various Artists
- Released: 2007
- Recorded: 2007
- Genre: OPM
- Length: 58:42
- Label: Viva Records
- Producers: Vic Del Rosario, Jr. Vincent Del Rosario

Various Artists chronology
The Best of Manila Sound: Hopia Mani Popcorn (2006)	The Best of Manila Sound: Hopia Mani Popcorn 2 (2007)

The Best of Manila Sound: Hopia Mani Popcorn 2 is compilation album of Manila sound songs that gained popularity in the Philippines during the 1970s. It is a follow-up to The Best of Manila Sound: Hopia Mani Popcorn album that was launched in 2006. The album is composed of 14 tracks, all in Tagalog, and performed by Giniling Festival, Imago, Juan Pablo Dream, Melany, Swissy, Session Road, Chilitees, Brownman Revival, Pedicab, Color It Red, Blue Ketchup, After Image and Cueshe. It was released under the Viva Records in 2007.

== Background ==
During the conceptualization of the "Best of Manila Sound" project by Viva Records, the company came up with a list of Filipino bands that could be part of the project which the bands enthusiastically welcomed. But all the bands could not be accommodated in the first album, The Best of Manila Sound: Hopia Mani Popcorn, and before its release, talks have already started for a second album. The Best of Manila Sound: Hopia Mani Popcorn 2 album was then started and eventually launched in 2007. Unlike its predecessor album, tracks in the Hopia Mani Popcorn 2 album are all in Tagalog.

== Track listing ==
1. "Titser's Enemy No. 1" - 03:13 by Giniling Festival (Original by Juan Dela Cruz Band)
2. "Bakit Ba Ganyan" - 04:14 by Imago (Original by Dina Bonievie)
3. "Bato Sa Buhangin" 03:26 by Juan Pablo Dream (Original by Cinderella)
4. "Bakit Labis Kitang Mahal" - 04:40 by Melany (Original by Boyfriends)
5. "Superstar Ng Buhay Ko" - 03:19 by Swissy (Original by Cinderella)
6. "Kung Kailangan Mo Ako" - 04:11 by sessiOnroad (Original by Rey Valera)
7. "Saan Ako Nagkamali" - 04:59 by Chilitees (Original by Tillie Moreno)
8. "Binibini" by - 04:34 Brownman Revival (Original by The Rainmakers)
9. "Awitin Mo Isasayaw Ko" - 04:40 by Pedicab (Original by VST & Company)
10. "Kartada Diyes" - 03:31 by Color It Red (Original by Rico J. Puno)
11. "Kamusta Ka" - 04:12 by Blue Ketchup (Original by Rey Valera)
12. "Tayong Dalawa" - 05:32 by Kiko Machine (Original by Rey Valera)
13. "Iduyan Mo" - 04:34 by After Image (Original by Basil Valdez)
14. "Laki Sa Layaw" - 03:37 by Cueshe (Original by Mike Hanopol)
