= Prettier Than Pink =

Female Filipino pop rock group

- Origin: Philippines
- Genres: Pinoy pop
- Years active: 1991–2016
- Label: Neo Records
- Past members: Lei Bautista (Vocals); Annie Trillo (Bass); Gretchen Gregorio (Keyboard); Vanessa Garcia (Drums)

Prettier Than Pink was an all-female Filipino pop rock group. The band went professional in 1991 with members Lei Bautista (lead vocalist), Annie Trillo (bass guitars), Gretchen Gregorio (keyboards), and Vanessa Garcia (drummer). Originally called Pretty and Pink, the band started playing 1960s music and progressed to playing 1980s music by artists such as Go-Go's, the Bangles, and the B-52s.

In 1995 a self-produced demo garnered interest from various record labels and the group changed its name to Prettier Than Pink. Neo Records (now VIVA Records) eventually signed them up. After five months, an eponymous debut album went gold. The single "Cool Ka Lang", written and composed by Bautista, reached no. 1 on the OPM charts.

By 1997, Prettier Than Pink's line-up had changed, with Bautista remaining the group's leader. Their second album, UnPink, was less commercially successful turn, but the song "Baby" received regional airplay. In 1998, Bautista was nominated for an Awit Award for "Baby".

Bautista left for the U.S. shortly thereafter, reviving Prettier Than Pink in America as a new wave-styled group. In 2005, Prettier Than Pink started recording their U.S. debut for the Sutton Records label.

== Members ==
=== Final line-up ===
- Lei Bautista - lead vocals/guitar
- Pamela Aquino - lead guitar
- Melanie Sarao - bass
- Amy Behrman - keyboards/vocals
- Jasmin Guevara - drums

=== Former line-up ===
- Gretchen Gregorio - keyboards
- Anne Trillo - bass
- Vanessa Garcia - drums
- Rozylyn Torres - lead guitar

== Discography ==
- Prettier in Pink (1995, VIVA Records)
- Un-Pink (1997, VIVA Records)
- Chop Suey (2005, Sutton Records)
