= Join the Club (band) =

Filipino alternative rock band

- Origin: Valenzuela, Metro Manila, Philippines
- Genres: Alternative rock; Pop-punk; Pinoy rock
- Years active: 2001–present
- Labels: Warner Music Philippines; Redrum Music; Universal Records; Viva Records; Sony Music Philippines; Ivory Music; MCA Music; Hello Sunrise Records
- Members: Biboy Renia; Migs Mendoza; Congie Lulu
- Past members: Aris Manjares †; Paolo Santiago; Brian Lotho; Louie Dela Cruz; Mark Garchitorena

Join the Club is a Filipino alternative rock band formed in Valenzuela, Metro Manila, in 2001. The band is known for songs including "Nobela", "Lunes", "Tinig" and "Paano Sasabihin".

The band's debut album, Nobela, was released in 2005 through Redrum Music and Warner Music Philippines. The album's songs, including "Nobela", helped establish the band in the Philippine music scene.

== History ==
=== 2001–2004: Formation and early years ===
Join the Club was formed in 2001 in Valenzuela. The band's early lineup consisted of Biboy Renia on vocals and guitar, Congie Lulu on bass, and Migs Mendoza on guitars, vocals and synthesizer. The group initially performed in the local punk scene in Valenzuela, Quezon City, Pasay, Pasig, Bulacan and other parts of Metro Manila.

Louie Dela Cruz initially played drums for the band before being replaced by Paolo Santiago. Santiago was a fellow music student of Renia and Mendoza at the University of Santo Tomas Conservatory of Music. Brian Lotho later became the band's drummer.

The band released an early demo and performed in local band competitions. Their song "Mahiwaga" was included on the compilation Full Volume, released by EMI Philippines.

=== 2005–2007: Nobela and mainstream success ===
Join the Club signed with Redrum Music and subsequently released their debut studio album, Nobela, through Redrum Music and Warner Music Philippines. The album was built around songs concerning romantic relationships and heartbreak.

Among its most prominent songs was "Nobela", which became one of the band's best-known songs. Other songs associated with the period include "Lunes", "Tinig", "Mahiwaga" and "Paano Sasabihin".

In 2007, Philstar.com described Join the Club as part of the wave of new Philippine rock bands that had emerged during the preceding year and reported that Nobela had become a major commercial success.

=== 2008–2012 ===
Following the success of Nobela, the band continued performing and releasing material. Their work during this period included additional recordings and appearances in the Philippine rock scene.

=== 2013–2015: Gera ng Balarila ===
Join the Club released their second studio album, Gera ng Balarila, in 2013. The album was released through Universal Records and included songs such as "Rakista", "Balewalang Pag-Ibig" and "Bagong Panimula".

The band continued to develop a sound that combined elements of alternative rock and punk with other influences. Apple Music describes the band's later work as incorporating post-punk and psychedelic elements.

=== 2015–present ===
Join the Club continued to release singles and other recordings after Gera ng Balarila. Their later catalog includes "Nahihibang", "Kahit Sa Panaginip Na Lang", "Gintong Nadarang Sa Apoy", "Solitaryo", "Paano Sasabihin", "Every Yakap Mo Pasko", "Going Home", "Going Home '82", "Sa Gabi Ng Pasko", "Laruan" and "My Heart".

In 2023, the band released the single "Going Home '82". In an interview with the BusinessMirror, vocalist Biboy Renia discussed the band's plans to release Christmas music, while drummer Mark Garchitorena discussed the challenges of producing Christmas songs.

== Musical style and influences ==
Join the Club has been described as an alternative rock and pop-punk band. Apple Music describes the band's music as drawing from rock, post-punk and psychedelic influences.

The band has cited artists and groups including Yano, Eraserheads, The Beatles, The Strokes, The Clash and Ramones among its influences.

== Band members ==
=== Current members ===
- Biboy Renia – lead vocals, acoustic guitar
- Migs Mendoza – lead guitar, keyboard synthesizer, backing vocals
- Congie Lulu – bass guitar, backing vocals
- Mark Garchitorena – drums, percussion

=== Former members ===
- Louie Dela Cruz – drums
- Paolo Santiago – drums
- Brian Lotho – drums
- Aris Manjares – rhythm guitar

== Awards and nominations ==
Year	Award giving body	Category	Nominated work	Results
2006	NU Rock Awards	Drummer of the Year	(for Paolo Santiago)	Nominated
2006	NU Rock Awards	Best Live Act	—N/a	Nominated
2006	NU Rock Awards	Rising Sun Awards	—N/a	Nominated
2006	NU Rock Awards	Song of the Year	"Nobela"	Nominated

== Discography ==
=== Studio albums ===
- Nobela (2005)
- Gera ng Balarila (2013)

=== Selected singles ===
- "Lunes"
- "Nobela"
- "Tinig"
- "Paano Sasabihin"
- "Nahihibang"
- "Kahit Sa Panaginip Na Lang"
- "Gintong Nadarang Sa Apoy"
- "Solitaryo"
- "Every Yakap Mo Pasko"
- "Going Home"
- "Going Home '82"
- "Sa Gabi Ng Pasko"
- "Laruan"
- "My Heart"
