= Ernani Cuenco =

Filipino composer (1936–1988)

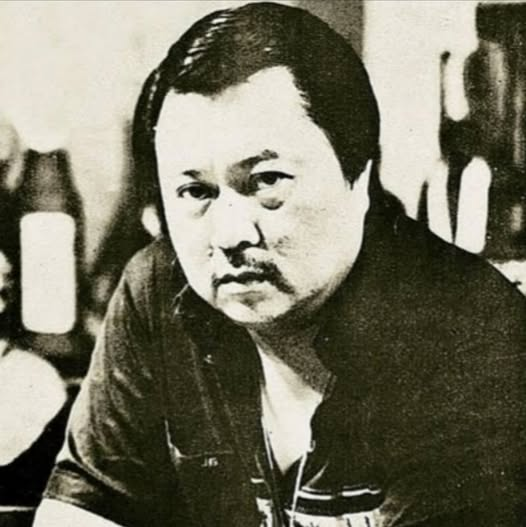
- Born: Ernani Joson Cuenco; May 10, 1936; Malolos, Bulacan, Philippines
- Died: June 11, 1988 (aged 52)
- Occupations: Composer; film scorer; musical director; music teacher
- Years active: 1960–1988
- Spouse: Magdalena Noel Marcial
- Children: 2
- Relatives
- Awards: Order of National Artists of the Philippines

Ernani Joson Cuenco (May 10, 1936 – June 11, 1988) was a Filipino composer, film scorer, musical director, and music teacher who was named a Philippine National Artist for Music in 1999.

== Life and career ==
He was born on May 10, 1936, Cuenco was born to Feliz Cuenco and Maria Joson in Malolos, Bulacan.

He played with the Filipino Youth Symphony Orchestra, and the Manila Symphony Orchestra from 1960 to 1968 as a cellist, and with the Manila Chamber Soloists from 1966 to 1970. He completed a music degree in piano and cello from the University of Santo Tomas where he also taught for decades until his death in 1988.

In 1968 he completed his master's degree in music at Sta. Isabel College in Manila.

He co-wrote the music for Bato sa Buhangin (1976). His other famous works include songs such as "Nahan, Kahit na Magtiis," and "Diligin Mo ng Hamog ang Uhaw na Lupa," "Pilipinas, Inang Bayan," "Isang Dalangin," "Kalesa", and "Gaano Ko Ikaw Kamahal".

He had two children with his wife, Magdalena, including Ernani Jr., or Jong, who is also a musician and composer.

He died on June 11, 1988.

== Awards ==
Year	Group	Category	Work	Result
1977	FAMAS Awards	Best Theme Song	Bato sa Buhangin	Won
1982	Metro Manila Film Festival	Best Music	Ang Panday: Ikatlong Yugto	Won
