= Ang Ating Musika =

2007 concert residency by Regine Velasquez

- Residency by Regine Velasquez
- Promotional poster for the show
- Location: Pasay, Metro Manila, Philippines
- Venue: Aliw Theater
- Start date: November 9, 2007
- End date: November 24, 2007
- Legs: 1
- No. of shows: 6

Regine Velasquez concert chronology
- Twenty (2006); Ang Ating Musika (2007); Silver (2012)

Ang Ating Musika (Tagalog: [ʔaŋ ˈaːtiŋ ˌmuːsiˈka]; transl. Our Music) was a concert residency by Filipino singer Regine Velasquez at the Aliw Theater in Pasay. The residency began on November 9, 2007, and concluded on November 24, 2007, after completing six shows. The set list featured all OPM numbers that were curated from a catalogue of Filipino composers and songwriters. These included material from George Canseco, Ryan Cayabyab, Rey Valera, and Basil Valdez, among others. The show was produced by Aria Productions, with GMA Network as its broadcast partner. Velasquez served as the stage director, while Raul Mitra was chosen as the music director. Martin Nievera, Jona Viray, Aicelle Santos, Maricris Garcia, Kyla, and April de los Santos performed as guest acts. Reviews for the shows were generally positive, receiving praise for the theme and Velasquez's live performance.

== Background and development ==
Early in her career, Regine Velasquez's musical style encompassed Original Pilipino Music (OPM) characterized by "kundiman" ballads and bubblegum pop love songs. These genres were particularly apparent during the late 1980's when she released her self-titled debut album. In an article published by the Philippine Daily Inquirer promoting her reality show Celebrity Duets: Philippine Edition on October 14, 2007, Velasquez revealed that she would headline a concert the following month at the Aliw Theater in Pasay titled Ang Ating Musika. The show's name and concept was crafted from Velasquez's desire to perform OPM material, which she described as a "tribute to the country's best songwriters and composers". The set list featured songs selected by Velasquez and her team from the catalogue of notable Filipino musicians, including Freddie Aguilar, George Canseco, Ryan Cayabyab, Louie Ocampo, Vehnee Saturno, Rey Valera, Basil Valdez, and Yoyoy Villame.

The show was produced by Aria Productions, in partnership with GMA Network. Velasquez served as the stage director, while Raul Mitra was chosen as the music director. Martin Nievera, Jona Viray, Aicelle Santos, Maricris Garcia, and Kyla were selected as guest acts. Velasquez described the song selection process as a daunting task, saying, "I don't want to miss out on any song or songwriter that's why I thought of doing two concerts-in-one." During planning and rehearsals, the production team initially came up with eighty song titles, which was eventually reduced. "Narrowing it down to only 19 proved difficult, if not impossible", she said. At Velasquez's request, several living composers and songwriters were invited to attend the concerts. Ang Ating Musika was aired as a television special on December 2, 2007, on GMA.

== Synopsis and reception ==
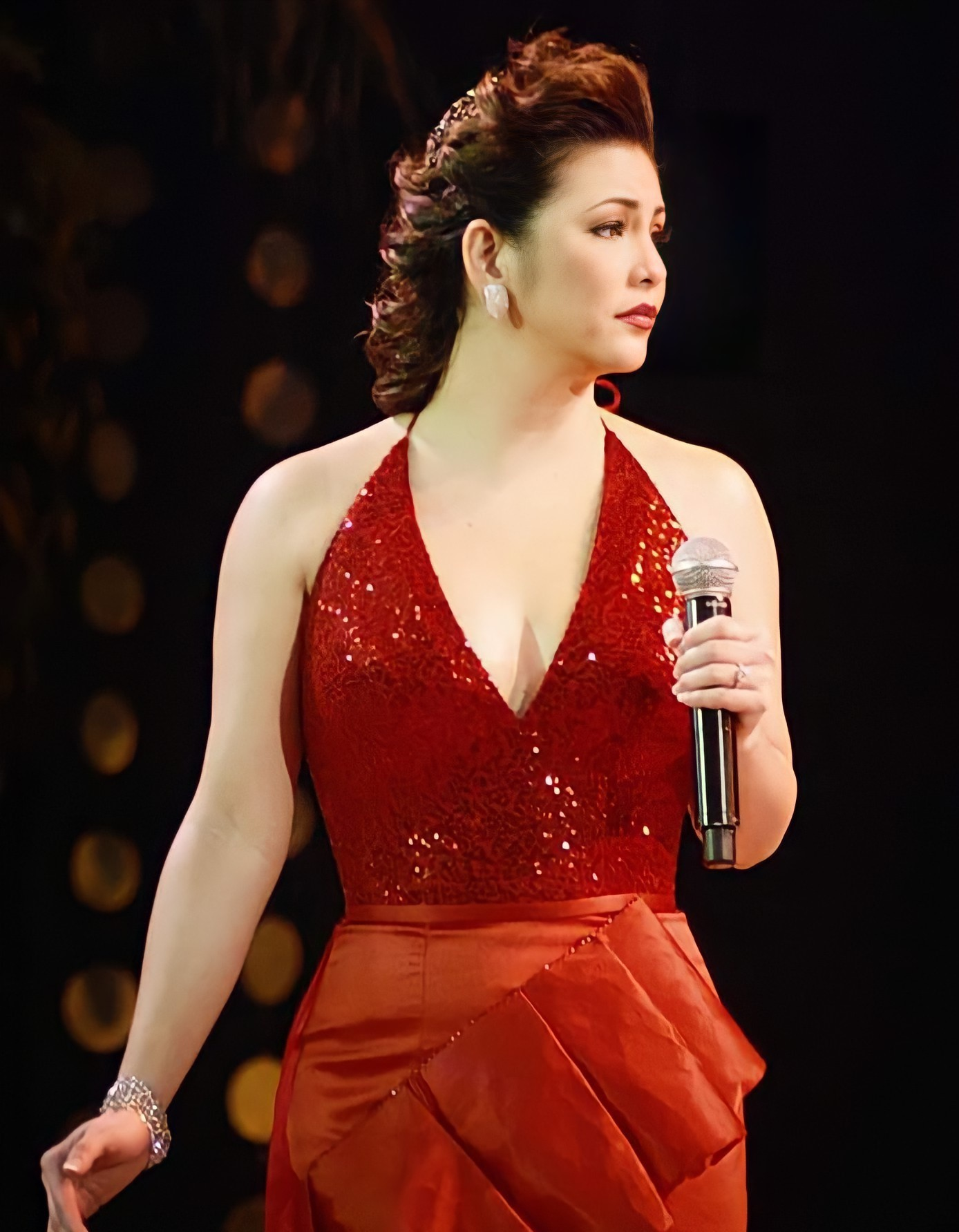
Velasquez performing an OPM tribute number during Ang Ating Musika

The stage design featured a tropical garden which resembled a scaled-down version of the Philippine landmark Luneta Park. The concert opened with an overture rendition of the theme from Hajji Alejandro's 1978 song "Hajji at Iba Pang Tunog Pinoy". The performance began with Velasquez, wearing a white gown, making her way to the stage as she is carried by a motorized tricycle to perform "Kay Ganda ng Ating Musika" accompanied by background dancers wearing traditional Filipino costumes. She then gets off of the vehicle and transitioned to "Hibang sa Awit" and "Limang Dipang Tao". The singer continued into a slower number, a Rey Valera-composed track "Sinasamba Kita", before she was joined by Jona Viray, Aicelle Santos, Maricris Garcia, and April de los Santos to perform a medley of OPM songs she recorded.

The second act saw Velasquez changing outfits into a red mermaid gown, and beginning a performance with Kyla of the soundtrack themes from its eponymous films, including "Saan Darating ang Umaga", "Gaano Kadalas ang Minsan", "Paano Ba Ang Mangarap", and "Kastilyong Buhangin". She then followed this with a sultry rendition of Yoyoy Villame's novelty hit "Butchikik". Velasquez continued with a medley of songs from singer-songwriter Odette Quesada. The third act began with Martin Nievera who joined the show to premiere him and Velasquez's duet "Kailangan Mo, Kailangan Ko". She then performed a medley of Ryan Cayabyab compositions while sitting by the stairs in the middle of the stage, and goes straight into another medley that paid tribute to George Canseco. Ang Ating Musika closed with an encore performance of Florante's "Handog" and Celeste Legaspi's "Minsan ang Minahal ay Ako".

Jo-An Maglipon of the Philippine Entertainment Portal praised the show's production value, mostly due to the well-crafted repertoire. She noted that Velasquez gave an emotional performance that resonated with her audience. Maglipon concluded, "Regine's endeavor to revive Original Pilipino Music is very much appreciated and should be applauded as a noble effort to rekindle interest in our rich musical heritage." Boy Abunda from The Philippine Star agreed with Maglipon in terms of the concert's variety and selection of OPM numbers, and considered Velasquez's collaboration with her guest performers a show highlight.

== Set list ==
The set list given below was performed on November 24, 2007. The list evolved over the course of the concert residency, and sometimes included other numbers.

1. "Kay Ganda ng Ating Musika" / "Hibang sa Awit" / "Limang Dipang Tao"
2. "Sinasamba Kita"
3. "Sana Maulit Muli" / "Dadalhin" / "Ikaw"
4. "Saan Darating ang Umaga" / "Gaano Kadalas ang Minsan" / "Paano Ba ang Mangarap" / "Tubig at Langis" / "Kastilyong Buhangin"
5. "Butchikik"
6. "Till I Met You" / "A Friend of Mine" / "Don't Know What to Say (Don't Know What to Do)" / "Special Memory"
7. "Kailangan Mo, Kailangan Ko"
8. "Sometime, Somewhere" / "How Can I?" / "Now That You're Gone"
9. "Hanggang sa Dulo ng Walang Hanggan" / "Kung Ako'y Iiwan Mo" / "Ngayon at Kailanman"

Encore

10. "Handog" / "Minsan ang Minahal ay Ako"

== Shows ==
List of concerts, showing date, city, venue, and guest act
Date	City	Venue	Guest act
November 9, 2007	Pasay	Aliw Theater	Martin Nievera; Jona Viray; Aicelle Santos; Maricris Garcia; Kyla; April de los Santos
November 10, 2007	Pasay	Aliw Theater	Martin Nievera; Jona Viray; Aicelle Santos; Maricris Garcia; Kyla; April de los Santos
November 16, 2007	Pasay	Aliw Theater	Martin Nievera; Jona Viray; Aicelle Santos; Maricris Garcia; Kyla; April de los Santos
November 17, 2007	Pasay	Aliw Theater	Martin Nievera; Jona Viray; Aicelle Santos; Maricris Garcia; Kyla; April de los Santos
November 23, 2007	Pasay	Aliw Theater	Martin Nievera; Jona Viray; Aicelle Santos; Maricris Garcia; Kyla; April de los Santos
November 24, 2007	Pasay	Aliw Theater	Martin Nievera; Jona Viray; Aicelle Santos; Maricris Garcia; Kyla; April de los Santos

== Personnel ==
Credits and personnel are adapted from the television special Ang Ating Musika. (Note: Ang Ating Musika was aired as a television special on GMA Network on December 2, 2007.)

Show

- Wilma V. Galvante – executive in charge of production
- Regine Velasquez – show direction, staging
- Raul Mitra – musical director
- Louie Ignacio – television director
- Perry Lansigan – assistant television director
- Juel Balbon – executive producer
- Cacai Velasquez-Mitra – executive producer, stage design
- Hazel Abonita – production manager
- Darling de Jesus – supervising producer
- Epoy Isonera – stage manager
- Paulo Paulino – lighting director
- Jun Bon Rustico – sound engineer
- Maro Garcia – associate producer
- Cez Urrutia – associate producer
- Diane Rogue – production associates
- Decca Pineda – production associates
- Pepsi Herrera – costume design
- Edwin Tan – costume design
- Cary Santiago – costume design

Band

- Cesar Aguas – guitars
- Meong Pacana – guitars
- Sonny Matias – keyboards
- Bond Samson – keyboards
- Tek Faustino – drums
- Niño Regalado – percussion
- Romeo Palana – percussion
- Rudy Lolano – percussion
- Babsie Molina – background vocalist
- Sylvia Macaraeg – background vocalist
- Rene Martinez – background vocalist

== See also ==
- List of Regine Velasquez live performances
