= Fred Panopio =

Filipino singer and actor (1939–2010)

- Born: Alfredo Panopio; February 2, 1939; Nueva Ecija, Commonwealth of the Philippines
- Died: April 22, 2010 (aged 71); Quezon City, Philippines
- Resting place: Manila Memorial Park; Sucat, Parañaque, Metro Manila, Philippines
- Other name: Fred
- Occupations: Singer, actor, comedian
- Years active: 1955–2007
- Known for: Yodeling, novelty
- Spouse: Lolita Mina-Panopio

Alfredo "Fred" Panopio (February 2, 1939 – April 22, 2010) was a Filipino singer and actor who rose to fame in the 1960s and 1970s.

He is known for having made the yodeling style of music famous in the Philippines. This particular kind of music is evident is many of his hits, such as "Pitong Gatang," "Markado," and "Tatlong Baraha". He was also an occasional actor, and appeared in several movies alongside Jess Lapid and Fernando Poe, Jr. He is also known sing the Poe's movie's theme songs. In 1999, Panopio and Victor Wood released an album and became part of the OPM legends.

He appeared in an episode of noon-time variety show Wowowee in 2009 as a special guest, during which host Willie Revillame addressed him as a "Living Legend".

== Personal life ==
He was married to Lolita Mina-Panopio; they had a daughter, Jennifer Panopio.

== Death ==
Panopio died of cardiac arrest on April 22, 2010, at the age of 71 in Quezon City, Philippines.

== Discography ==
=== Albums ===
==== Studio albums ====
- Nalulumbay Ako (Dyna Records)
- Mga Hinaing Ng Puso (Dyna Records)
- Mga Awit ng Pag-ibig ni Fred Panopio (Dyna Records)
- Pagpatak Ng Ulan (Dyna Records)
- Naku, Inday (Bakit Mo Ibinigay) (Dyna Records)
- Sa Hardin ng Mga Rosas (Dyna Records)
- Awit (Dyna Records)
- Fred Panopio (Self-titled) (Dyna Records)
- Sawing-Palad Ako (Dyna Records)
- Pamasko Ni Fred Panopio (LP & CD Re-issue) (Dyna Records)
- Mahalin Mo Ako (Dyna Records)
- Mahal Pa Rin Kita (1975, Plaka Pilipino)
- Sa Lapyahan (1975, Plaka Pilipino)
- Fred Panopio (1977, Plaka Pilipino)
- Bida (1978, Plaka Pilipino)
- Banderang Puti (1994)
- Fred Panopio (Novelty Collection) Re-issue on CD (Dyna Records)

==== Compilation albums ====
- Kawawang Cowboy (1994)
- Pitong Gatang

=== Singles ===
==== Scale Records ====
- "Pitong Gatang" / "Chime Bells" (with Tony Maiquez and His Combo, 1959)

==== Dyna Records ====
- "Ako'y sa Iyo Lamang"(Ako’y sa iyo lamang(Oaly Foolish People)(3:09)
- "Aking Señorita" (Side B)
- "Ayos Na ang Buto-buto" (with Pablo Vergara and the Concaver) / "Hello, Miss Wow-Wow"
- "Ang Kapalaran Ko" (adapted from "My Way") / "Kabilanin sa Pag-ibig"
- "Bakit Ako Nabubuhay" / "Lalu Kitang Iibigin"
- "Bakas ng Pag-ibig" (Side B)
- "Bayaan Mong Mahalin Kita" / "Kung Sakali Man"
- "Belle" (adapted from "Ben")
- "Ha Ha Ha - Hi Hi Hi" / "Nais Kong Malaman Mo"
- "Hahanap-Hanapin Ko" (adapted from "Sealed with a Kiss") / "Naala-ala Mo Ba Ako"
- "Higit sa Buhay Ko" / "Maging Sino Ka Man"
- "Honeymoon sa Buwan" (Side B)
- "Kung Ako'y Mahal Mo"
- "Luluha Ka Rin"
- "Nalulumbay Ako" / "Bakit Ka Nagtatampo"
- "Puso Ko'y Naghihintay"
- "Siya ang Tanga Kong Mahal"
- "Sa Pangarap Na Lamang"
- "This Is My Song"
- "Unawain Mo Sana"/Fred Panopio, Vol. 4;/ 1971 Dyna Music/Released on: 1971-05-26/Writer: Pablo Vergara
- "Upang Mahalin Ka" / "Walang Nagmamahal"
- "Sawing Palad Ako" (Adaptation: All of a Sudden)/ "Naniniwala Ako" (adapted from "I Believe")
- "Naku, Inday! (Bakit Mo Ibinigay)"
- "Kasaysayan ng Pag-ibig" (adapted from "Theme from Love Story") / "Dapat Mong Mabatid"
- "Naglahong Pag-ibig" (Side B)
- "Kung Kailangan Mo Pa Ako"Ako (Look Around)Lyrics arrangement & Direction by Pablo Vergara)2:42)
- "Magtaksil Ka Man" (Side B)
- "Lady"
- "Lumang Larawan" (adapted from "Photograph")
- "Pagsintang 'Sing Laki ng Daigdig" (Side B, adapted from "Top of the World")
- "Vengadora"Vengadora · Fred Panopio/Fred Panopio, Vol. 4/℗ 1971 Dyna Music/Released on: 1971-05-26

==== Plaka Pilipino ====
- "Mahal Pa Rin Kita" / "Bakit Ako'y Pinaasa"
- "Nasa sa 'Yo 'Yan" (Side B)
- "Putlon Mo Ba?" / "Dili Ko Buot (Nga Mahilak Ka)"
- "Tayo'y Mag-'Bump'"
- "'Type' ni Kumpare, 'Sexy'" / "Gumikan sa Awit" (adapted from "One Day in Your Life")
- "Mahirap Na'ng Ma-Por Nada" / "Lagi Kang Mamahalin"
- "Sa Aking Buhay"(Adaptation: One Day in Your Life_Jackson 5 / "Bakit Ganyan ang Pagsinta"
- "Banyaga" / "Pahiyom Na, Ngisi Pa"
- "Babay, Baby Babay" / "Minsan" (with Elvira de la Peña)
- "Nasasabik sa Iyo" / "Kawawang Cowboy" (adapted from "Rhinestone Cowboy") (1977)
- "Ingkong" / "Lagi Kang Alaala"
- "Bida" / "Huwag Ka ng Humirit"
- "Kung Ayaw Mo sa Akin" / "Oh! Ang Mga Babae"
- "Sayang" / "Joe Quintero" (1978)
- "Super Hopia Disco" (with Yoyoy Villame and Max Surban, 1978)

==== Blackgold Records ====
- "Buto't Balat"
- "Daldalan" (Side B, adapted from "Kan-on Pa" by Yoyoy Villame)
- "Buwisit" (Side B)
- "Hold Up"

==== Able Music ====
- "Ang Mahal Ko'y Tanging Ikaw" (adapted from "One Moment in Time")

==== Alpha Records ====
- "Bahay Kubo" / "Gloria, Gloria Labandera" (adapted from "Battle Hymn of the Republic")
- "Muling Magmahalan" / "Pitong Gatang"

==== Mabuhay Records ====
- "Tatlong Beses Maghapon"

==== Charm Records ====
- "Upang Mabatid"

==== Coronet Records ====
- "Turo Turo Restaurant"

=== Songs ===
- "Ako'y Sundalo" (I am a soldier)
- "Anak ni Markado"
- "Alanganing Sumama"
- "Aking Señorita" ("Teenage Señorita")
- "Aling Tina"("Don't Cry For Me Argentina")
- "Ako'y Sayo Lamang"
- "Ang Aking Pagsuyo"
- "Ang Asawa Kong Ambisyosa" ("Tie A Yellow Ribbon...")
- "Ang Ganda ng Ating Mundo"
- "Ay, Ay, Ay Delilah" ("Delilah")
- "Ang Kalayaan Mo'y Maaangkin" ("Love Me for What I Am")
- "Ang Kapalaran Ko(Adaptation: My Way_Frank Sinatra"
- "Ang Labo Mo"
- "Ang Singsing Kong Alay"
- "Awit" ("Killing Me Softly With His Song")
- "Ayaw Ko Nang Lumuha Pa"
- "Ay'g Dotdot Jane" ("Dick and Jane") (with Elvira Dela Pena)
- "Babay Baby Babay" ("Save Your Kisses For Me")
- "Baka Lumimot Ka(Adapt. "HELP ME MAKE THROUGH THE NIGHT" (1974)"
- "Belle" ("Ben")
- "BAKAS NG PAG-IBIG
- "Lyrics, Arrangement and Direction By: Pablo Vergara(Adaptation: Traces_ )
- "Bakit Ba, Bakit Ba" ("Baby Blue")
- "Bakit Ganyan ang Pagsinta(Adapt. (Morning Side Of The Mountain) from the 45rpm, flipside of

"SA AKING BUHAY" (1975)"

- "Bakit Ka Ganyan"
- "Bakit, Saan, Kailan"
- "Banderang Puti"
- "Banyaga" (Cebuano Visayan)
- "Bida"
- "Bilib Ka Ba?" ("My Melody Of Love")
- "Bisyo"
- "Bohemyo" ("Bohemian Rhapsody Queen")
- "Bomba, Bomba" ("Mama Mama")
- "Buhay" ("Sunshine")
- "Chime Bells"
- "Dapat Mong Mabatid" ("For All We Know")
- "Di Bulhog, Di Buta Ang Gugma" (Swerte Ka)
- "Di Kita Malilimutan"
- "Di Kita Maaring Limutin"
- "Dili Ko Buot (Nga Mohilak Ka)" "Dili Ko Buot (Nga Mahilak Ka)"/(I'm Leaving It All Up To You) /Cebuano lyrics by Sonny Loremas /Arranged by Ramrods /From the album Sa Lapyahan"

(TSP-5173) (Plaka Pilipino, Vicor Music Corporation)

- "Di Mo Lang Nalalaman(Adaptation:I Don't know How To Love Him_)"
- "Duwag" ("Coward of the County")
- "Esnatser ng Puso"
- "Fred at Elvie"
- "Ginang Goli"
- "Giyera Noon" ("Charade")
- "Gloria, Gloria Labandera"
- "Gugma Ko, Pinangga Ko Ikaw (Dearest One)"
- "Gumikan Sa Awit" ("One Day in Your Life")
- "Ha, Ha, Ha, Hi, Hi, Hi" ("My Stupid Darling_Pauline Sevilla")
- "Habang Ako'y Kailangan Mo"
- "Fred Panopio - Habang May Buhay(Always and Ever_Fred Murphy Davis)(Sa among Pag-anhi)))"
- "Halik, Halik, Halik" ("Kiss Me, Kiss Me")
- "Hahanap-hanapin ko(Adaptation:Sealed with A Kiss_Bobby Vinton"
- "Hanggang Wakas" ("Beyond the Reef")
- "Harana"
- "HIGIT SA BUHAY KO (This is My Song) - Fred Panopio/Arranged and directed by Pablo Vergara/Lyrics by:Pabo Vergara/DN-7477-A"
- "Himig ng Pag-ibig Natin"
- "Hinahanap-Hanap Kita"
- "Hinum-dumi" (Cebuano Visayan)
- "Honeymoon Sa Buwan"
- "Huwag Ka Ng Humirit"
- "Huwag Mo Akong Pasakitan" ("Release Me")
- "I Can't Stop Loving You"
- "Ikaw ang Aginaldo"
- "I Love My Teacher (Oh my God!)"
- "Ibig Ko Ay Bata"
- "Inay, Mahal Kita"
- "Inay, Wala Kang Kapantay"
- "Ingkong"
- "Kailangan Kita sa Buhay Ko"
- "Kantahan Tayo"
- "Kay Lupit Mo"
- "Kay Saya ng Pasko" ("Jingle Bell Rock")
- "Kasaysayan ng Pag-ibig" ("Love Story")
- "Kawawang Cowboy" ("Rhinestone Cowboy")
- "Kay Gulo"
- "Kung Ako'y Iibigin"
- "Kung Ako'y Mahal Mo (Official Audio)(Adaptation:The Way it used to be_Engelbert Humperdinck)/Lyrics/Arrangement./Direction: Pablo Vergara"
- "Kung Ikaw Ay Wala Na"
- "Kung Lalayo" ("But If You Leave Me")
- "Kung Mahal Mo Ako"
- "Kung Malaya Lang Ako"
- "Kung Sakali Man(Adaptation:If_Bread)"
- "Labingdalawang Araw ng Pasko" ("The Twelve Days of Christmas")
- "Lady, Aking Lady"
- "LADY_Fred Panopio/Adapt:My Sweet Lady_Jhon Denver/Arranged By: Romy Santos/Directed By: Buddy Medina/Words:Buddy Medina/DN-7958-A
- "Lagi Kang Ala-ala"
- "LAGI KANG IIBIGIN (Adaptation of the song "I'll Always Love You (Day After Day)"
- "Lagi Kang Mamahalin"(Tune: We Never Love Like This Again)
- "Laging "Knock Down"" ("Knock Three Times")
- "Laging Nasa Isip"
- "Luluha Ka Rin"
- "Lumang Larawan" ("Photograph")/Lumang Larawan (adapted from "Photograph")/DN-7959-B/2:45/Adapt:Photograph/Directedby:Buddy Medina/Arranged by Narding Castaneda"
- "Magpahilayo" (Cebuano Visayan)
- "Mahal Pa Rin Kita"
- "Mani"
- "Mapungay Na Mata"
- "Markado"
- "Masiphayo"
- "Masulob-on Kong Pasko" (Cebuano Visayan) (with the Filipinas Singers)
- "Mekeni's Gold"
- "Mga Ala-ala"
- "Mga Hinaing ng Puso"
- "Mo"
- "Minsan" (with Elvira Dela Pena)
- "Muling Magmahalan"
- "Naku! Buhay"
- "Naku! Inday Bakit Mo Ibinigay" (Mr. Love)
- "Nalulumbay Ako" ("I Feel Blue")
- "Naniniwala Ako (adapted from "I Believe")"
- "Nasasabik Sa Iyo"
- "NASA SA 'YO 'YAN - Fred Panopio

Requested by patzmarzbelt. This was taken from the 1975 album "Mahal Pa Rin Kita"/PP-7491-B/Produksiyon ni: Ernie dela pena/Titik : Philip Maninang/I'm Leaving It (All) Up To You_Donny&Marie Osmond – (Rhythm :the same with "I Feel Blue "Eddie Peregrina"

- "Nawa'y Patnubayan Ka"
- "Ngano Kaha"
- "Ngunit Ngayon"
- "O Giliw Ko" (Honey(song))
- "O Hindi"
- "O! Ang Mga Babae" ("Zodiac")
- "Oh! Candida" ("Candida")
- "Okey Ngarud" ("Sweet Caroline")
- "Oye Ho 'Maba" ("Oye como va")
- "Paalam"
- "Pag Ibig Ko'y Hanggang Wakas(Fred Panopio)(Adaptation: Eternally_Jerry Vale/Petula Clark/Charlie Chaplin)"
- "Pagpatak ng Ulan" ("Rain")
- "Pagkasayang" (Mandayan Song)
- "Pagsintang Sing Laki Ng Daigdig-Fred Panopio/(Adaptation: Top of the World_The Carpenters)/Arranged and Britz and Pieces/Supervised & directed by Buddy Medina"
- "Pagsisisi"
- "Pahiyum Na, Ngisi Pa" (Cebuano Visayan)
- "Pangako Ako Sa Iyo"
- "Pitong Gatang"
- "Pogi Dehin Goli-Fred Panopio/DYNA Records/Rare Music Collection Library /Arranged and directed by: Pablo Vergara/The Dave Clark Five - Tabatha Twitchit - 1967"
- "Puso"
- "PUSO KO'Y NAGHIHINTAY - Fred Panopio/DN-7483-A/Lyrics By – P. Vergara*/(One Day)/Arranged and Directed by Pablo Vergara/2:48"
- "Pusong Wasak"
- "Putlon Mo Ba?" (Cebuano Visayan)Putlon Mo Ba? (Who Made You Cry and Write that Song?) – Fred Panopio

Singer: FRED PANOPIO – Putlon Mo Ba?

Album: Sa Lapyahan Format: Vinyl, Album, LP Stereo Label: Plaka Pilipino – TSP-5173 Release Date: 1975 Fred Panopio King of Philippine Novelty Songs Fred Panopio OPM Vinyl Playlist"

- "Queta Pu Quecami" (Kapampangan)
- "Regalo Ni Itay"
- "Rose Of San Anton"
- "Sa Araw ng Kasal(Adaptation: I Went To Your Wedding_Victor Wood)"
- "Sa Hardin Ng Mga Rosas"(Rose Garden)
- "Sa Aking Pag-iisa(Adaptation: Sound of Silence_Simon and Garfunkel"
- "Sa Iyo Ang Aking Puso" ("Bridge Over Troubled Water")
- "Sa Lapyahan"
- "Sabi Nila"
- "Sonata ng Pag-ibig" (Sonata of Love)
- "Sa Sayawan Natalisod"
- "Sabik Sa Pagmamahal"
- "Sana'y Pansinin"
- "SAWING PALAD AKO -(All of a Sudden_Matt Monro)"
- "Si Kumpare at Si Kumare(Si Kumpare at si Kumare (Mayamaya nganong Nalipay Ka)(Adaptation:Manang Biday)"
- "
- "Siya ang Tangi kong Mahal"
- "SONATA NG PAG IBIG - Fred Panopio/Famous hit song SONATAOF LOVE_by Chris Solano & D'swooners /Tagalog Adaptation by Fred Panopio (LP)/Sonata ng pag-ibig · Fred Panopio FRED PANOPIO ℗ /1972 Dyna Music /Released on: 06/30/1972"
- "Sorry! Mang Fred" ("Don't Cry Joni") (with Elvira Dela Pena)
- "Sumpang Walang Hanggan"
- "Taknang Mahimaya-on" (Cebuano Visayan) (with the Filipinas Singers)
- "Tumulo Na Nasasabik sa Iyo"
- "Tatlong Baraha"
- "Tayo'y Magpakasal Sa Lahat ng Simbahan" ("Tie a Yellow Ribbon Round the Ole Oak Tree")
- " Tayo na sinta (Adaptation_Tiny Bubbles_Nora Aunor)"
- "Turo Turo Restaurant"
- "Tayo'y Mag-"Bump" (The Bump)"
- "Tayo'y Magmahalan"
- "Tumawa Tayo at Humahalakhak"
- "Turistang Bilmoko" ("An American Dream")
- "Turuan Mo Ako"
- "Unawain Mo Sana" (I Understand)"
- "Upang Mahalin (I Only Live to Love You) (Official Audio)"
- "West Virginia"
- "Ya Ya Ya Ya"
- "Yahu, Yahu"

== Filmography ==
- Tisoy (1960)
- Markado (1960)
- Teen-age Crush (1960)
- Tres Mosqueteros (1960)
- Tatlong Baraha (1961)
- Hugo, the Sidewalk Vendor (1962)
- Capitan Pepe (1969)
- Songs and Lovers (1970)
- Omar Cassidy and the Sandalyas Kid (1970)
- My Pledge of Love (1970)
- From the Bottom of My Heart (1970)
- Sweet Caroline (1971)
- Gangsters Daw Kami! (1971) .... Legs Diamond
- Baldo Is Coming (1971) .... Billy Dikit
- Pagputi ng Uwak, Pag-itim ng Tagak (1978)
- D'Godson (1983)
- The Fighting Mayor(1983)
- Ompong Galapong: May Ulo, Walang Tapon (1988)
- Target:Central Luzon Bank robbery (1989)
- Dito sa Pitong Gatang (1992)
- Manila Boy (1993)
- Dugong Aso: Mabuting Kaibigan, Masamang Kaaway (2001) – Gambling operator in nipa hut
