= Anak (song) =

Single by Freddie Aguilar

from the album Anak
- Language: Filipino
- A-side: "Anak"
- B-side: "Child"
- Released: 1978
- Recorded: 1977
- Studio: Cinema Audio
- Genre: OPM, Pinoy pop, folk
- Length: 3:53 (single version); 5:52 (album version)
- Label: Vicor Music (original release); Warner Chappell Music (international); Star Music (copyright owner)
- Songwriter: Freddie Aguilar
- Producer: Celso Llarina

"Anak" (lit. 'Child') is a Tagalog song written and performed by Filipino folk singer Freddie Aguilar. It made the finals for the inaugural 1978 Metropop Song Festival held in Manila. It became an international hit, and was translated into 51 languages. The lyrics speak of Filipino family values. The current copyright owner of the song is Star Music, a recording company owned and operated by the Philippine media conglomerate ABS-CBN Corporation. It was produced by Celso Llarina of VST & Co, with an arrangement by D'Amarillo (Doming Amarillo). Tito Sotto was the executive producer for this song as well as its album of the same name. It is the best-selling single by a Filipino artist of all time.

== Inspiration and composition ==
Freddie Aguilar left home at the age of 18 without graduating from school. His father, who had wanted him to be a lawyer, was disappointed. Aguilar traveled to faraway places carrying with him only his guitar. With no one to guide and discipline him, he got into gambling. Realizing and regretting his mistakes five years later, Aguilar composed "Anak", a song of remorse and apology to his parents. He went back home and asked for forgiveness from his parents, who welcomed him with open arms. After his father read the lyrics of "Anak", a profound reconciliation occurred between them, fostering a significant closer bond; regrettably, his father died not long after. According to Felipe de Leon, Jr., an authority on Philippine music, the song was composed in a Western style but has aspects of pasyon.

== Impact ==
"Anak" became a finalist in the first MetroPop Song Festival. It went on to become very popular in the Philippines and eventually abroad. The song generated a hundred cover versions, was released in 56 countries and in 27 different foreign languages, and is claimed to have sold 30 million copies. However, the claim is unlikely, and only four songs have been confirmed to have sold at least 30 million copies.

An eponymous film was released in 2000, with a plot inspired by the lyrics of the song.

== Other recordings or versions ==
- Sweet Charity (from the 1979 self-titled album “Sweet Charity")
- Larry Matias (from the 1978 self-titled album)
- Tito, Vic, and Joey (parody entitled, Anak ng Kuwan, from their album, Iskul Bukol)
- Carabao (entitled, Lung Khi Mao ("The Drunken Old Man"), from the 1981 album Khi Mao, the band debut album)
- Blonker, (band of German guitar player Dieter Geike, from their 1982 album "Fantasia")
- Regine Velasquez (from the 1991 album Tagala Talaga)
- Gary Valenciano (from the 2000 movie soundtrack Anak) (only appears on the movie soundtrack)
- Sharon Cuneta (from the 2000 movie Anak) (used in movie credits)
- Kuh Ledesma (from the 2000 album Duet With Me)
- Side A (from the 2001 album The Platinum Collection)
- Lea Salonga (from the 2004 live album Songs from Home: Live Concert Recording)
- The Kelly Family (from the 1980 single Alle Kinder brauchen Freunde)
- Michael Holm ("Kind" which means Child in German)
- Noel Cabangon (from the 2012 album, Tuloy Ang Biyahe)
- Cusco (entitled "Philippines", from their 1983 album Virgin Islands)
- Mitoy Yonting (from the 2013 various artists album The Voice of the Philippines: The Final 4)
- Ramon Jacinto (from the 1992 instrumental album The Guitarman II) (used in the instrumental medley includes "Walk Don't Run" and "Diamond Head")
- Victor Wood (from the 1979 Indonesian Album)
- 愛著啊 by Jody Chiang (江蕙) from album 愛著啊 (Taiwanese language)
- Sarah Geronimo (from the 2012 album Pure OPM Classics)
- Jacob Collier (from his 2025 concert at New Frontier Theater, Quezon City)
- Tha Chin Myar Nae Lu by playboy Than Naing (1980)
- သီချင်းများနဲ့လူ by Htoo Ein Thin ( တေးမြုံငှက် နှစ် (၅၀) ၂ (၂၀၀၃) တေးစု )
- Carefree (kumpulan) (Malay language, from the 1979 album Kebebasan)
- Vader Abraham (Dutch language, singing about his childhood hometown, Elst)
- KZ Tandingan sang parts of the song in both Tagalog and Mandarin languages on the breakout round of the sixth season of Singer 2018
- 아들 by Lee Yong-Bok (Korean language, 1979)
- 아들 by Jung Yoon-Sun (Korean language, 1981)
- 息子 by Jiro Sugita (1978)
- 息子 by Tokiko Kato (1978)
- Child (Anak) by Louie Castro (賈思樂) from 1979 album It's O.K. in Hong Kong (English language)
- 孩兒 by Alan Tam (譚詠麟) from 1979 album 反斗星 in Hong Kong (Cantonese language)
- 你的影子 by Kenny Bee (鍾鎮濤) from 1979 album 我的夥伴 in Hong Kong (Mandarin language)
- 三分、七分 by Paula Tsui (徐小鳳) from 1982 album 徐小鳳全新歌集 in Hong Kong (Cantonese language)
- Con yêu by Cẩm Vân (Vietnamese: my beloved kid)

== In popular culture ==
"Anak" was featured in the 1978 television film Tadhana, the first feature-length animated film in the Philippines. It was also featured in the 2015 South Korean action film Gangnam Blues and the 1990 Hong Kong film Fatal Vacation.

== Commercial performance ==
According to Billboard, Anak has sold 120,000 copies within its first two weeks of release and has sold over 750,000 by March 1979 in the Philippines. New Strait Times reported in April 1980 that the single has already sold 4.5 million copies throughout Asia, two years since it was first released. Due to its success, Billboard magazine named Aguilar the second best-selling artist of 1981 in Europe. By 1983, Billboard reported that Anak had already sold six million copies globally.

Anak was the first Filipino-language song to be released in Japan and has been certified Gold in the country.

== Charts ==
=== Weekly charts ===
Chart (1980)	Peak position
Belgium (Ultratop 50 Flanders)	7
Netherlands (Dutch Top 40)	2
Netherlands (Single Top 100)	4
West Germany (GfK)	39

=== Year-end charts ===
Chart (1980)	Position
Belgium (Ultratop Flanders)	57
Netherlands (Dutch Top 40)	28
Netherlands (Single Top 100)	47

== See also ==
- List of best-selling singles by country
