= Imelda Papin =

Filipino singer and politician (born 1956)

The Honourable Imelda Papin
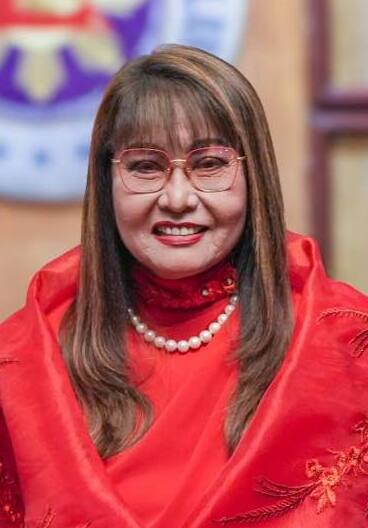
- Papin in 2024

Vice Governor of Camarines Sur
- In office June 30, 2019 – June 30, 2022
- Governor: Miguel Luis Villafuerte
- Preceded by: Romulo Hernandez
- Succeeded by: Salvio Patrick Fortuno Jr.
- In office June 30, 1998 – June 30, 2004
- Governor: Luis Villafuerte
- Preceded by: Salvio Fortuno
- Succeeded by: Salvio Fortuno

Personal details
- Born: Imelda Arcilla Papin; January 26, 1956 (age 70) Presentacion, Camarines Sur, Philippines
- Party: PFP (2021–present)
- Other political affiliations: PDP–Laban (2018–2021); Liberal (2015–2018); Lakas (2012–2015); Bangon (2009–2012); NPC (1995)
- Spouse: Jose Antonio Carrion (annulled)
- Children: 1
- Education: University of the East; University of Hawaiʻi at West Oʻahu (BS)
- Profession: Singer; Politician

Imelda Arcilla Papin (born January 26, 1956) is a Filipino singer and politician. In the late 1970s, her singles "Bakit (Kung Liligaya Ka sa Piling ng Iba)" and the realized "Isang Linggong Pag-ibig", released in October 1992, originally from her sister Gloria Papin, reached national radio airplay. She later served as the vice governor of Camarines Sur and was married to Filipino politician Jose Antonio Carrion.

== Early life ==
Papin was born on January 26, 1956, in Presentacion, Camarines Sur. She began her singing career in her home province before relocating to Manila. She attended Bitaogan Elementary School and St. Brigitte School in Buhi. She began her tertiary education at the University of the East and later completed a Bachelor of Science in Commerce at the University of Hawaiʻi at West Oʻahu.

== Music career ==
Papin released her second studio album, Kutob (1978), under Wonderland Records. The album included the track "Bakit?", which charted in the Philippines. She continued her recording career throughout the late 1970s and 1980s, releasing multiple studio and compilation albums.

Papin later relocated to Las Vegas, Nevada, where she became a regular performer, frequently appearing at venues such as the Orleans Showroom. She hosted a three-hour telethon on Channel 18 in Los Angeles, one of the earliest Filipino artists to do so. From 2010 to 2012, Papin hosted a television program titled Imelda Papin in America on LA-18, and a radio show titled The Imelda Papin Voice of the Heart.

== Political career ==
In 1995, Papin ran for Governor of Camarines Sur but lost to Luis Villafuerte. She was elected vice governor in 1998 and served two terms. In 2004, she ran for the congressional seat in Camarines Sur's fourth district but lost to incumbent Felix Alfelor Jr. In 2010, Papin ran for the Philippine Senate under the Bangon Pilipinas party but was unsuccessful.

In 2013, the Commission on Elections initially disqualified her from running for congress in San Jose del Monte, Bulacan, due to a lack of residency, but reversed its decision on April 25. She lost the election to incumbent Representative Arthur Robes. In 2016, she ran for congress again in Camarines Sur's fourth district but was defeated by Representative Arnulfo Fuentebella.

Papin returned to politics in 2019, running for vice governor as the running mate of Governor Migz Villafuerte under PDP–Laban, defeating board member Russel Bañes. In 2022, she ran for governor of Camarines Sur a second time but lost to Luigi Villafuerte.

In 2024, President Bongbong Marcos appointed her as an acting member of the Board of Directors of the Philippine Charity Sweepstakes Office.

== Personal life ==
Papin was married to former Marinduque Governor Jose Antonio Carrion and had a daughter. Her daughter reportedly pursued a Bachelor's degree in Mass Communication at the University of Nevada, Las Vegas, and later worked as a paralegal.

== Discography ==
=== Albums ===
==== Studio albums ====
- Imelda (Wonderland Records, 1978)
- Kutob (Wonderland Records, 1978)
- I Love You, Imelda (Wonderland Records, 1979)
- Imelda Papin (Sunshine, 1980)
- Mel (Sunshine, 1980)
- Christmas with Imelda Papin (Sunshine, 1980)
- Love Is... (Alpha Records, 1983)
- Songs & Emotions (Emerald Records, 1984)
- The Woman, The Singer (Emerald Records, 1986)
- Buhay at Pag-ibig ni Imelda Papin (Alpha Records, 1992)
- Bakit Ikaw Pa? (Alpha Records, 1994)
- Dahil Minamahal Kita (D'Concorde, 1999)
- Phenomenal Hits of Imelda Papin Volume 1 (D'Concorde, 1999)
- Phenomenal Hits of Imelda Papin Volume 2 (D'Concorde, 1999)
- Nag-iisang Imelda (Galaxy Records/Universal Records, 2001)
- Iba Ka sa Lahat (Universal Records, 2004)
- Voice of the Heart (618 International, 2008)
- Merry Christmas Mahal Ko (618 International, 2008)
- I Love You (Viva Records/618 International, 2009)
- Bakit? (Universal Records/618 International, 2010)

==== Compilation albums ====
- Imelda's Favorite Hits (Wonderland Records, 1980)
- Imelda's Greatest Hits (Sunshine, 1981)
- Sabik (Vicor Music, 1994)
- Golden Collection Series: The Best of Imelda Papin (Alpha Records, 2001)
- Once Again... with Didith Reyes, Geraldine, and Imelda Papin Volume 4 (with Didith Reyes & Geraldine) (Victor Music, 2003)
- Puso sa Puso (Sunshine/Vicor Music, 2005)
- Greatest Hits (Alpha Music, 2009)

==== Collaboration albums ====
- Jukebox King & Queen (with Victor Wood) (D'Concorde, 1999)

==== Compilation appearances ====
- All Star Pinoy Top Hits (Alpha Records, 1983)

Track A1: "Giniginaw Ako"
Track A2: "Kaligayahan Mo'y, Kaligayahan Ko Rin"

=== Singles ===
- "Ako Ba o Siya"
- "Ako Nga Ba Ito"
- "Bakit?" (1978, re-recorded as "Bakit? (Kung Liligaya Ka sa Piling ng Iba)" in 2001)
- "Bakit Ikaw Pa?" (originally by Geraldine) (1994)
- "Bakit Kaya"
- "Bakit Mo Pa Inibig"
- "Bawal"
- "Dalawa Kaming Api (2001)
- "Di Totoo"
- "Dinggin"
- "Guhit ng Palad" (2001)
- "Habang May Panahon"
- "Hinanakit"
- "Hindi Ko Kaya" (originally by Richard Reynoso)
- "Hindi Maiiwanan"
- "Iniibig Ko ang Iniibig Mo" (originally by Luz Loreto and then by Mimi Baylon) (1992)
- "Isang Linggong Pag-ibig" (Isang Linggong Pag-ibig movie theme song) (1993)
- "Kailangan Ko"
- "Kaligayahan Mo'y, Kaligayahan Ko Rin" (1983)
- "Kapiling Mo, Kasuyo Ko"
- "Katarungan"
- "Masakit"
- "Minsan" (originally by Bert Dominic)
- "Pinag-isa ng Diyos"
- "Pinaglaruan"
- "Sabik" (1981)
- "Sayang Na Sayang"
- "Taksil"
- "The Winner Takes It All" (originally by ABBA)
- "Titig Mo" (1999)
- "Titigan Mo Ako" (originally by Baby Shake Rico) (2010)
- "Tukso Ka Ba?" (D' Originals theme song) (2017)
- "Umaga Na Wala Ka Pa" (originally by Eva Eugenio) (1999)
- "We Could Have It All" (originally by Maureen McGovern)
