= Plaka Pilipino =

- Parent company: Vicor Music Corporation
- Founded: 1970
- Status: Defunct
- Distributors: Vicor Music Corporation (Viva Records)
- Genre: Various
- Country of origin: Philippines
- Location: Quezon City

Plaka Pilipino was a Filipino record label of Vicor Music Corporation from 1970 to 1981. It released works by famous local artists such as Pilita Corrales, Fred Panopio, Victor Wood, Yoyoy Villame, and Didith Reyes. It focused on folk and native music.

== Notable artists ==
- Nora Aunor
- Bentot
- Pilita Corrales
- Jesus Garcia, Jr.
- Boy Sullivan
- D' Big 3 Sullivans
- Bobby Gonzales
- Sylvia La Torre
- Sonny Loremas
- Ric Manrique Jr.
- Bert Marcelo
- Romeo Miranda
- Edgar Mortiz
- Fred Panopio
- Eddie Peregrina
- Romeo Quiñones
- Didith Reyes
- Richie D'Horsie
- Vilma Santos
- Max Surban
- Victor Wood
- Yoyoy Villame
