= Didith Reyes =

Filipina actress and singer (1949–2008)

- Born: Maria Helen Bella Avenila Santamaria; September 17, 1949; Manila, Third Philippine Republic
- Died: December 10, 2008 (aged 59) Biñan, Laguna, Philippines
- Genres: Pop music blues
- Occupations: Businesswoman singer actress
- Years active: 1975–1980; 2002–2008
- Label: Vicor Music

Maria Helen Bella Avenila Santamaria (September 17, 1949 – December 10, 2008), better known as Didith Reyes, was a Filipina actress and singer best known for recording a string of hit love ballads in the mid-1970s like "Araw-araw, Gabi-gabi", "Bakit Ako Mahihiya...?" and "Hindi Kami Damong Ligaw". Many music enthusiasts regard her as one of the Philippines' "Jukebox Queens", along with other singers popular during her time such as Claire dela Fuente, Amapola (Maria Cabase), Eva Eugenio, Leah Navarro, and Imelda Papin. She was notorious for accidentally exposing her breasts while singing "Bakit Ako Mahihiya?" during the 1977 FAMAS Awards Night.

Two months before her death, Reyes was interviewed by journalist Korina Sanchez about her retirement in the music industry and her new life as a beauty salon owner.

== Early life ==
Born Maria Helen Bella Avenila Santamaria on September 17, 1949, Reyes was the elder of two children. Her early years were difficult. At age fifteen, she ran away from her home and was known to skip school to join singing contests while in high school at Santa Isabel College. After studying Fine Arts at St. Scholastica College, she joined the Circus band, which would lead her to overnight success.

== Success ==
After her stint with Circus band and Time Machine, Reyes signed up with Vicor Music Corporation as a solo recording artist. This was after she was found by lifelong friend, Normita Japitana, found her in Ermita. She would soon score her first hit single with the eponymous theme song to the 1975 film Araw Araw Gabi Gabi, written by Willy Cruz. Her other hits included Nananabik, Hindi Kami Damong Ligaw, Bakit Ako Mahihiya?, Hatiin Natin Ang Gabi, and Aliw. Her hits earned her the title Jukebox Queen, which also is shared with her best friends, Claire dela Fuente, Leah Navarro, Eva Eugenio, and Imelda Papin. Reyes gained further acclaim when she won a Gold Prize and the Best performer at the 1977 Tokyo Music Festival. Her self-titled debut album, Didith, was a platinum bestseller. She also held international concerts, particularly, in Japanese cities such as Kyoto and Tokyo.

Aside from singing, Reyes also tried acting through a role in the film Mabango ang Bawat Bulalaklak. Her songs, Hindi Kami Damong Ligaw and Nananabik, were also turned into a films starring her, as well as Bakit Ako Mahihiya?, which earned her notoriety during duet with Rico J. Puno in a televised presentation of the song at the 1977 FAMAS Awards Night, when she accidentally exposed her breast while wearing a flimsy gown.

Her showbiz career is marred with controversy, as she had relationships with many men, particularly prominent businessmen, club owners, politicians and those from the military.

== Later years ==
Reyes's career stalled in the 1980 as she suffered from a drinking problem and drug addiction. In her later years, Reyes reportedly suffered from depression. In 2006, she accused a former live-in partner Eulogio "Mang Ely" Disonglo with domestic abuse, leading to his eventual criminal conviction for violating the Anti-Violence Against Women and Children Law.

Reyes later worked as a receptionist and stylist at a hair salon. In 2002, she returned to show business with a featured role in the GMA Network drama anthology Magpakailanman. She was supposed to revive her singing career in 2008.

== Personal life ==
She was survived by her son Arvi, from her previous marriage to Victor Reyes.

== Death ==
Three days before she died on December 10, 2008, in Biñan, Laguna, Reyes claimed to have sustained injuries after having been sideswiped by a vehicle. She died in her sleep at the home of a friend. The cause of her death was not immediately clear. Some sources attributed her death to a recurrent stomach problem, while her friend, singer Claire dela Fuente, said that Reyes died of an apparent heart attack as her pancreas ruptured. A police investigation was initiated to establish the cause of her death. An autopsy revealed that Reyes had suffered from an enlarged heart and clogged arteries, lending further credence to the belief that the singer had suffered a fatal heart attack. Her wake was held in Our Lady of Mount Carmel Church in Quezon City.

== Discography ==
=== Albums ===
==== Studio albums ====
- Didith (Plaka Pilipino, 1976)
- Nananabik (Plaka Pilipino, 1977)
- Merry Christmas (Plaka Pilipino, 1977)
- Aliw (Blackgold, 1979)

==== Compilation albums ====
- Once Again... with Didith Reyes, Geraldine and Imelda Papin Vol. 4 (with Geraldine & Imelda Papin) (Vicor Music, 2003)
- 18 Greatest Hits (Vicor Music, 2009)

=== Singles ===
- "Araw-araw, Gabi-gabi" (1975)
- "Hindi Kami Damong Ligaw" (1976)
- "Bakit Ako Mahihiya" (1976)
- "Nananabik" (1977)
- "Magbabalik" (1977)
- "Aliw" (1979)

== Filmography ==
=== Television ===
Year	Title	Role
2002	Magpakailanman: Didith Reyes Life Story	Herself

=== Film ===
Year	Title	Role
1979	Mabango ba ang Bawat bulaklak	
1977	Nananabik	
1976	Bakit Ako Mahihiya...?	
1976	Hindi Kami Damong Ligaw	

== Awards and nominations ==
- 1977 Tokyo Music Festival – Gold Prize and the Best Performer

== See also ==
- Kuh Ledesma
- Rico J. Puno
- Imelda Papin
- George Canseco
- Pilita Corrales
- Amapola (Maria Cabase)
