= Panopio =

Panopio is a surname. Notable people with the surname include:

- Dalph Panopio (born 2000), Filipino-Italian basketball player
- Fred Panopio (1939–2010), Filipino singer and actor
