= Yoyoy Villame =

Filipino musical artist (1932–2007)

Member of the Las Piñas City Council
- In office 1998–2001
- In office 1988–1995

Personal details
- Born: Roman Tesorio Villame; November 18, 1932 Calape, Bohol, Philippine Islands
- Died: May 18, 2007 (aged 74) Las Piñas, Philippines
- Party: Laban ng Demokratikong Pilipino
- Spouse: Tessie Codilla (m. 1993)
- Musical career
- Genres: Novelty; educational; OPM
- Occupations: Singer-songwriter; comedian; actor; politician; jeepney driver; bus driver
- Instruments: Vocals; bandurria
- Years active: 1972–2004
- Labels: Vicor Music; Alpha Records; Star Records

Roman Tesorio Villame (November 18, 1932 – May 18, 2007), better known as Yoyoy Villame (Tagalog: [ˈjojoɪ ˌbiːljɐˈmɛ]), was a Filipino singer, composer, lyricist, actor, politician and comedian.

== Early life ==
A native of Calape, Bohol Province, Villame was the youngest of ten children of a fisherman father and fishmonger mother. He started composing songs for the Boy Scouts in his elementary days. Dropping out after his second year in high school, Villame enlisted to become a soldier-trainee of the Philippine Army. Being unhappy with his post in Pampanga, he asked for a discharge after the surrender of rebel leader Luis Taruc. He became a passenger jeepney driver plying the Baclaran-Pasay Taft-Santa Cruz-Dimasalang route. During the ten years of driving jeeps, he would compete in amateur nights held at Plaza Miranda in Quiapo only to lose, reportedly due to his strong Visayan accent.

In 1965, Villame returned to Bohol to become a bus driver, where he formed a rondalla band with some fellow drivers; he sang and played the mandolin. His first recording was in 1972 and entitled "Magellan", a parody of historicism of Ferdinand Magellan's failed 1521 conquest of the Philippines. This became the top-selling record in the Visayas-Mindanao region. Comedian Chiquito recognized his potential and brought Villame back to Manila to be signed to Vicor Records, which re-issued most of the Kinampay catalogue. Touring Pampanga, Nueva Ecija and other parts of Luzon helped Villame establish his name in the country.

Villame was the first to brand his music as "novelty" to distinguish himself from his contemporaries, who tried hard to sound like Perry Como or Frank Sinatra. It was the beginning of a long list of albums and recordings of his politically inspired songs in Bisaya, Tagalog and English.

== Career ==
Villame blended Filipino folk melodies, popular tunes and nursery rhymes for his music and then added witty, comedic lyrics that mixed Tagalog, Cebuano and English in a unique grammar he had devised. He also sang of Filipinos’ daily experiences such as traffic congestion in the song "Trapik". He became a national figure in 1977 with his near-anthemic "Mag-exercise Tayo" (“Let us exercise”), which was adopted by government agencies and public schools as the official music for morning exercise routines after the flag ceremony.

Among his most popular songs was "Butse Kik". Originally released under the title "Vietcong Palagdas" with the Embees and the MB Rondalla Band, the song was written from made-up Chinese-sounding words, which Villame allegedly came up with by writing down the names of Chinese stores while waiting for a mechanic to fix his broken-down jeepney in Manila's Chinatown; it borrowed from the tune of Dee Dee Sharp's "Baby Cakes", a 1962 hit. The song would then be covered by a host of artists, Aiza Seguerra and The Company to name a few. The Chinese-Filipino in Cebu felt slighted by the song but dropped plans to sue Villame because not a single actual Chinese word was included in the song.

Villame wrote "Philippine Geography", which lists 77 major islands, provinces, cities, municipalities, and towns in the Philippines from north to south. He also established a love team with "Barok Labs Dabiana" and celebrated his fisherman father with "Piyesta ng Mga Isda". His song "Take It, Take It" ("Pasko ng Fiasco") took potshots at the Manila Film Festival scam in the 1990s. He made more than 25 albums and won several sales awards, among them a double platinum for his album Tirana My Dear and a platinum for McArthur and Dagohoy in 1991. He also won Best Novelty Award for "Piyesta ng mga Isda" at the 1993 Awit Awards. His long list of hits and his entertaining style of music earned him the title of 'King of Philippine Novelty Songs'.

Villame began making film in the early 1970s with the help of Chiquito. His first on-screen appearance was in Isla Limasawa, where "Magellan" was used as theme song. In 2004, he played a Visayan troubadour in the critically acclaimed film, Babae sa Breakwater ("Woman of the Breakwater"). In doing over 50 films, Villame is most noted for his role in the 1974 suspense thriller Biktima. His song "My Country, My Philippines" was later played in the opening scene of the 2005 film Ang Pagdadalaga ni Maximo Oliveros, while his songs landed in the soundtrack for the film Pepot Artista.

On July 21, 1989, Villame was one of the passengers of the BAC 1-11 airplane when it overshot an airport runway and crashed into a busy highway in West Service Road part of Parañaque; none of the passengers perished, with Villame uninjured, but eight people on the highway died from the crash.

He moved to Las Piñas, where he became a city councilor for ten years. He then ran for vice-mayor in 1995 on a platform focused against illegal drugs but lost.

== Personal life ==
Villame married his 21-year partner Elizabeth "Tessie" (née Codilla) on August 14, 1993 at a chapel in San Diego, California; they had seven children, including singer Hannah Villame. He later converted to the Members Church of God International, known for its television and internet program, Ang Dating Daan.

== Death ==
Villame died of cardiac arrest on May 18, 2007. He was buried at Calape Catholic Cemetery in his birthplace of Calape.

== Discography ==
=== Albums ===
Kinabuhing Bol-Anon	1971	Kinampay Records
with the Embees and the MB Liner Rondalla
1. "Magellan"; 2. "Alimukoy"; 3. "Manoy"; 4. "Cora"; 5. "Pagkatam-is"; 6. "Dagohoy"; 7. "Mag-exercise Ta"; 8. "Pastilan Anak"; 9. "Birth Control"; 10. "Biotlogy"; 11. "Vietcong Palagdas"; 12. "Palagdas March"
I Shall Return	1972	Kinampay Records
1. "I Shall Return"; 2. "Columbus"; 3. "Tiny Bubbles"; 4. "Ang Perlas"; 5. "Tsuper ng Jeepney"; 6. "Pailub Lang Pinangga"; 7. "Kinabuhing Bol-Anon"; 8. "Kinhason"; 9. "Gobiyerno sa Kadagatan"; 10. "Malipayon ang Takna"; 11. "Crabs Administration"; 12. "Wa Na Gyud"
The Third Of Yoyoy (Ay Loleng)	1972	Kinampay Records
1. "Painitan"; 2. "Kumbera"; 3. "Ay Loleng"; 4. "Batasan Nga Bag-O"; 5. "Ampong Sugarol"; 6. "Ani-a Si Rosita"; 7. "Vietnam Rose"; 8. "Caingit Rock"; 9. "Sa Idad Pa Ako'g Sixteen"; 10. "Mga Bu-otan"; 11. "Paregla sa Mga Batan-on"; 12. "Basta"
When Christmas Comes	1973	Kinampay Records
1. "When December Comes"; 2. "Pinaskohan ni Lolo ug Lola"; 3. "Kuliling Ding Dong"; 4. "Pasko Na Pod"; 5. "Pobreng Manaygunay"; 6. "Maayong Pasko"; 7. "Misterios ni Herodes"; 8. "Mga Pastores Kong Kauban"; 9. "Away Im a Manger"; 10. "Tala Na Mag-Ambahon"; 11. "Pinaskohan sa Akong Trato"; 12. "Viva! Viva!"
Yoyoy	1977	Plaka Pilipino Records
1. "Mag-exercise Tayo"; 2. "Philippine Geography"; 3. "Nasaan Ka Darling?"; 4. "Mentras Lariang"; 5. "Bukonut Woman"; 6. "Bungalow"; 7. "Tarzan at Barok"; 8. "Exercise Boogie"; 9. "Welcome Balikbayan"; 10. "Oh! My Sweet"; 11. "Kanser"
Yoyoy Is Barok	1978	Plaka Pilipino Records
1. "Granada"; 2. "Kaming Mga Waiter"; 3. "Trapik"; 4. "I'll Never Love Again"; 5. "Awit Na Kanta"; 6. "Bombero"; 7. "Pangako ng Boy Scout"; 8. "Sabi Barok Lab Ko Dabiana"; 9. "Biyenan"; 10. "Bus Driver Boogie"; 11. "Playboy"; 12. "Diklamasyon"
Gi-Indyan	1978	Plaka Pilipino Records
1. "Pagkamingaw"; 2. "Ikaw"; 3. "Hikalimti Na Lang"; 4. "Kilum-Kilum"; 5. "Pasyensya Mga Batig Nawong"; 6. "Gi-indyan"; 7. "Lorena"; 8. "Gugmang Dinalian"; 9. "Mag-Flower Dance Kita"; 10. "Hain Na"; 11. "Bayle sa Tibuok Kalibutan"; 12. "Leonora"
Tigmo	1980	Plaka Pilipino Records
1. "Tigmo"; 2. "Ambot Lucila"; 3. "Dalawidaw"; 4. "Gue Kha Guid"; 5. "Butse Kik"; 6. "Ngano"; 7. "Gaksa Ako"; 8. "Duso-Duso Butong"; 9. "Dinhi Ning Yuta Daghang Yawa"; 10. "Kan-on Pa"
Harana ni Yoyoy: From Saudi with Love	1981	Sunshine Records
1. "Harana"; 2. "Pagbu-otan Baya Day"; 3. "Dalagang Banikahon"; 4. "Bisan"; 5. "Ikaw ang Bulak"; 6. "Hangtud Kanus-a"; 7. "Pasalyo-Anay Lang Ta"; 8. "Pinangga Ko"; 9. "Salig Na Pinangga"; 10. "Gugmang Matinumanon"
Best of Yoyoy	1982	Vicor/Sunshine Records
1. "Da, Da, Da (Tsismis)"; 2. "Mag-exercise Tayo"; 3. "Tarzan at Barok"; 4. "Granada; 5. "Si Felimon"; 6. "Butse Kik"; 7. "Hayop Na Combo"; 8. "Magellan"; 9. "Philippine Geography"; 10. "Nasaan Ka Darling?"; 11. "Nasalisihan"; 12. "Bungalow"; 13. "Sion..,'Tion"; 14. "Tang-go"
The Best of Yoyoy Part 2	1982	Vicor/Sunshine Records
1. The Teacher and the Pupils; 2. The Bible; 3. Trapik; 4. Exercise Boogie; 5. Mr. Robot-Bot; 6. Diklamasyon; 7. ABC and the Music; 8. Happy Birthday; 9. Kaming Mga Waiter; 10. Buhay at Pag-ibig ni Barok; 11. Wise (Lies); 12. Gusot Na Rin
Mac-Arthur and Dagohoy	1991	Sunshine Records
1. Djing-Djing; 2. Ay Loling; 3. Alimukoy Waltz; 4. Hala Charing; 5. Kondansoy; 6. Cora; 7. I Shall Return; 8. Painitan; 9. Lusay Waltz; 10. Dagohoy; 11. Pastilan Anak; 12. Kinilao
Kudeta ni Bonifacio	1988	Sunshine Records
1. Kudeta ni Bonifacio; 2. Huwag 'Yan; 3. Eklipse; 4. Hey; 5. My Country, Philippines; 6. I'm Sorry; 7. Alam Mo; 8. Sikat Na Pangit; 9. Lucila; 10. T.N.T – U.S.A; 11. Balikbayan; 12. Ako'y Babalik
Tirana, My Dear	1988	Sunshine Records
1. Kudeta ni Bonifacio (Visaya); 2. Ayaw Na (Huwag 'Yan); 3. Eklipse (Visaya); 4. Kahayag sa Kangitngit; 5. Islahanon; 6. I'm Sorry (Visaya); 7. I Know (Visaya); 8. Lu-oy (Sundalong Way Itlog); 9. My Country, Philippines; 10. Tirana (Visayan Folk Song); 11. Barsi; 12. Hey (Visaya)
Gitik-Gitik	1994	Alpha Records

=== Singles ===
- "Paregla sa Mga Batan-on" / "Caingit Rock" (1971)
- "Gobiyerno sa Kadagatan" / "Sa Idad Pa Ako'g Sixteen" (1971)
- "Magellan" / "Dagohoy" / "Tsuper ng Jeepney" (1971)
- "Kinilaw" / "Ay Loleng" (1972)
- "Ang Perlas" (Side B, 1972)
- "I Shall Return" / "Columbus" (1972)
- "Crabs Administration" (1972)
- "Wa Na Gyud" / "Batasan Nga Bag-o" (1972)
- "Kundansoy Cha Cha" / "'Day"
- "Isprakenhayt" (1973)
- "Kanser" / "Bungalow" (1977)
- "Duha" / "Boy Scout Na Ko" (1977)
- "Tarzan at Barok" / "Mag-Exercise Tayo" (1977)
- "Philippine Geography" / "Welcome Balikbayan" (1977)
- "Nasaan Ka Darling" / "Exercise Boogie" (1977)
- "Granada '78" / "Sabi Barok Lab Ko Dariana" (1978)
- "Gugmang Dinalian" (Side B; 1978)
- "Super Hopia Disco" (with Max Surban and Fred Panopio) / "Kawawa Naman Ako" (1978)
- "Bayle sa Tibuok Kalibutan" / "Pagkamingaw" (1978)
- "Mag-Flower Dance Kita" / "Gi-Indyan" (1978)
- "Rapido Rock" / "Bombero" (1980)
- "Tigmo" / "Gaksa" (1980)
- "Misteryo ni Herodes" / "Christmas ng Isang Bilanggo"
- "Aha... Hala Ka" / "Si Felimon, si Felimon" (1982)
- "Happy Birthday" (1983)
- "Sangla Lupa Punta Saudi"
- "Wooly Booly" / "Ang Classmate Kong Alien" (1989)
- "Piyesta (ng Mga Isda)" / "Tweedle Tweedle Dam" (1993)
- "Likas-Yaman" (1993)
- "Lilibee" (Side B, 1994)
- "Ring-Ting-A-Ling Ding-Dong" (Side B, 1994)

== Filmography ==
=== Film ===
- Isla Limasawa (1972)
- Eh, Kasi Bisaya (1972)
- Los Compadres (1973)
- Cariñosa (1973)
- Telebong, Telebong, Telebong (1973)
- "Sinbad" The Tailor (1973)
- Prinsipe Abante (1973)
- Abogado de Campanilla (1973)
- Isprakenhayt (1973)
- Jack and the Magic Beans (1974)
- Biktima (1974)
- Batul of Mactan (1974)
- Enter Garote (1974)
- Pepe and Pilar (1975)
- Anino sa Villa Lagrimas (1976)
- Sabi Barok Lab Ko Dabiana (1978)
- Tadhana (television film, 1978)
- Ang Sisiw Ay Isang Agila (1979)
- Dabiana and Barok (1980)
- Barok Goes to Hong Kong (1984)
- Wooly Booly: Ang Classmate Kong Alien (1989)
- Tootsie Wootsie (1990)
- ~~Titser's~~ Enemi No. 1 (1990)
- Bikining Itim (1990)
- Hulihin si... Nardong Toothpick (1990)
- Ang Titser Kong Alien: Wooly Booly II (1990)
- Humanap Ka ng Panget (1991) – Cyrano
- Katabi Ko'y Mamaw (1991) – Brgy. official
- Andrew Ford Medina: Huwag Kang Gamol (1991)
- Ober Da Bakod (The Movie) (1994)
- Once Upon a Time in Manila (1994) – 'Bai
- Tunay Na Magkaibigan, Walang Iwanan... Peksman (1994)
- Milyonaryong Mini (1996)
- Hindi Sisiw ang Kalaban Mo (2001) – Yoy
- Sis (2001)
- Pepot Artista (2004)
- Woman of Breakwater (2004)

=== Television ===
- T.O.D.A.S. (IBC 13)
- T.O.D.A.S. Again (IBC 13)
- Alabang Girls (TV5)
- Toink: Hulog ng Langit (GMA 7)
- D'on Po sa Amin (New Vision 9) - Gilbert Magaling
- Eat Bulaga! (New Vision 9, ABS-CBN, GMA 7)
- Bubble Gang (GMA 7) – guest/himself
- Maynila (GMA 7)
- Idol Ko si Kap (GMA 7)
- Milyonaryong Mini (with Max Surban) (ABS-CBN Regional)
- Hokus Pokus (GMA 7) – His last TV role
- Tunay na Buhay (GMA 7) – Posthumously featured
