= Bontoc Eulogy =

- Directed by: Marlon Fuentes
- Written by: Marlon Fuentes
- Screenplay by: Marlon Fuentes
- Story by: Marlon Fuentes
- Produced by: Marlon Fuentes
- Starring: Marlon Fuentes; Michael Porter; Eliseo Bacolod; Enrico Obusan; Fermina Bagwan
- Distributed by: Corporation for Public Broadcasting
- Release date: 1995
- Running time: 56 minutes
- Countries: United States; Philippines
- Language: English

Bontoc Eulogy is a 1995 docudrama directed by Marlon Fuentes and distributed by the Corporation for Public Broadcasting. It was produced, written, directed, edited by, and stars Marlon Fuentes in the main role of a screen narrator going through an excruciating internal conflict regarding his heritage and following his thoughts as he recounts his grandfather's journey to the St. Louis World's Fair. It is the fifth film produced by Marlon Fuentes, following Arm in 1994.

Despite a limited audience view worldwide, this experimental documentary offered a deep and critical insight into Filipino history, and is considered a pioneering work in autoethnography. As a photographer, filmmaker, and conceptual artist, Marlon Fuentes' work has been shown in over 60 separate exhibitions in the past 20+ years alone and has been represented in collections such as Smithsonian Institution’s National Museum of American Art, the National Museum of American History, the Houston Museum of Fine Arts, the Library of Congress, the Corcoran Gallery of Art, and the Santa Barbara Museum of Art. Furthermore, his work has been nominated for the International Documentary Association’s Distinguished Achievement Award and has received many awards from the international community.

Controversy surrounds the film even decades after its release. Some questioned the film for making audiences believe that this seemingly personal account was "real," because the piece combined fictional and factual content as a seamless historically based personal narrative. However, it can be soundly argued that the film's meaning would have been altered had this cinematic device been revealed in the beginning. Some critics have argued that the declaration of its fictional conceit via the film credits is actually the meta-denouement of the film, part of the multiple layers of interrogation conducted by the filmmaker/narrator in trying to ascertain the relationship between form and narrative. The location of the filmmaker (as "narrator") within the commingled streams of fiction and historical facts raises critical questions about the porosity of diegetic, extra-diegetic, and non-diegetic space in cinematic representations of culture and identity formation/s. The film balances its multi-layered critical objectives and formal devices without sacrificing accessibility to an audience. As an experimental, post-ethnographic film that uses/extends (albeit in stealth) the devices of structuralist/materialist cinematic conventions, the film still passes the test of "eminent watchability" despite its rigorous art-historical/theoretical agendas and lineage.

== Plot ==
The unnamed narrator, a serious Filipino-American immigrant, muses about his days in the Philippines and continues on to speculate on the mysterious disappearance of both of his grandfathers. His curiosity leads him to research his past and urges him to discover the whereabouts of his kin. He offers the audience an inside look to his internal conflict regarding his family history by narrating throughout the film. Much of the movie consists of snapshots and footage of the World's Fair and some of the "real" footage has been, in fact, just a reenactment of what is thought to be the past.

The film begins with the narrator thinking of his children and subsequently thinking of his days as a child in the Philippines. He expresses his sadness of belonging to neither country (America or Philippines) and his desire to gain a foundation for his personal history. With this said, the narrator recounts the story of both of his grandfathers' lives. One of the grandfathers' (Emiliano) had fought in the revolution against Spain in 1896 and the Philippine–American War in 1899, only to be killed in the trenches and never have his body found. The narrator speculates that his grandfather is probably buried in one of the several mass graves on the outskirts of Manila.

While Emiliano had an interesting death by fighting in the war, the other's story was far more interesting. The other grandfather, named Markod, had been an Igorot warrior in the Philippines. When the Americans had first came to the village, the tribal members were afraid. But, they soon realized that the Americans wanted to become friends and take them to America to showcase their culture. Markod was, at first, hesitant since his wife was expecting a child. In 1904, Markod and several families of his village decided to go America as participants in the St. Louis World's Fair. At the time, Markod had been a young chief, known for his skills as a hunter and warrior.

Markod was first taken to San Francisco on a boat and then taken to St. Louis on a train, where 2 of his companions froze to death in a boxcar. Once at St. Louis, the Igorots built an entire village out of the "traditional" elements of the Philippines. The St. Louis World's Fair was set to begin.

At the World's Fair, many people came to see the men and women on display at the Philippine reservation. These people wanted to catch a glimpse of the Filipino in flesh and blood, in their "natural habitat". Over 1,000 "natives" of various heritages were on display simultaneously at the fair. Native tribes which had not known of each other's existence were placed next to each other on the reservation. The aim of this was to show to the American people the various stages of social progress, from "barbaric" to "civilized" and Christian. Markod admired the skills of the different tribes and he marveled at the various animals on display at the fair.

One day, a sick baby girl born to an African couple was taken away and never seen again. The father of the child talked about the incident and the authorities of the World's Fair became wary of an uprising. Extra scouts were posted in the village. Markod thought about how the Western people say that their God is strong, but their medicines are weak. The death of the child deeply disturbed Markod and he became fearful that evil things would begin to happen. Markod became homesick and missed his wife and home in the mountains. He became disturbed at the noise and brightness of the fair and longed for the quietness of his home. Two Igarot men also disappeared and the whole village mourned at their death. They mourned for days while the American public watched, unaware of their grief.

Markod tried to escape after this incident. He escaped into the woods and relished the music of the sounds of nature he knew so well. He hoped to get by unnoticed and would be able to escape from the fair. When reaching the edge of the forest, he fell into a deep sleep, only to awaken surrounded by unknown American faces. He was then placed in a solitary confinement to keep him from escaping.

When the World's Fair ended, Markod mysteriously disappeared. The narrator comes back into the plot here and he discovers through archives, that there had been an unusual incident just before the closing of the fair, which involved the death of an Igorot male. The remains had been mangled beyond recognition, but authorities had determined that he was Filipino by the color of his skin. This man could have been Markod, or he could have been put on display at other fairs around the country. Still, Markod's remains could currently be displayed at the Smithsonian Museum where the brains of two Filipinos had been removed immediately after their death.

At the end of the film, the location of Markod's body was still unknown and the narrator still wonders on the whereabouts of his ancestor.

== Cast ==
- Marlon Fuentes as narrator: The voice of the nameless main character who narrates and guides the story.
- Jordan Porter as the boy with the camera:This unnamed boy in the film is one of the two children of the narrator, who are born and are growing up in the United States.
- Nicole Antonio as the girl with the camera:The unnamed girl is the narrator's other child.
- Michael Porter as the boy in the mosquito net: This character is a portrayal of the narrator as a young child living in the "primitive" Philippines.
- Eliseo Bacolod as Markod: The character of Markod (the grandfather) while on the ship traveling to the World's Fair.
- Enrico Obusan as Markod: The character of Markod while in St. Louis.
- Fermina Bagwan as Markod: The voice of Markod when he speaks into the phonograph and documents his life as an exhibition in the World's Fair.
- Aaron Levinson as male announcer: Announcer towards the end of the film, describing the narrator's findings on his hunt for an explanation of his grandfather's whereabouts.

== Director ==
Marlon Fuentes is a Philippine born, Los Angeles based artist. He is an alumnus of the prestigious Philippine Science High School. His undergraduate study focused on behavioral science and anthropology, graduating with a Bachelor of Arts, Summa cum laude, from De La Salle University's Liberal Arts Honors Program, in Manila, Philippines. He studied photography with Mark Power at The Corcoran School of Art in Washington D.C., and was awarded a Presidential Fellowship at Temple University's MFA program in Philadelphia, PA.

Fuentes has created numerous works in film, photography, conceptual, and text-based art. His work has been displayed in over 60 exhibits in the past 20+ years. He has received international awards and praise and is known for his many professional works, such as, B.E.A.T., Sleep With Open Eyes, Tantalus, Arm, and Crikee. Furthermore, his work has been acclaimed worldwide and has been shown in museums, including the Netherlands Filmmuseum, the Museum of Modern Art in New York and the Guggenheim Museum in New York. In the past, Fuentes has been a visiting artist at New York University, Antioch College, along with other educational institutions.

== Soundtrack ==
Various "tribal" and "Western" music was played throughout the film. It served the purpose of signaling the transition between the two cultures within the movie and to create an exaggeration of the cultures. The Western music was much more upbeat and contained various complex instrument (example: the piano). The "traditional Filipino music" showcased the basic stereotype of "tribal" music with the use of the drum. The soundtrack in this film included "Music and Dance from the Hill Peoples of Northern Philippines" and also utilized music from Ramon Obusan.

== Three Aspects of the Rhetorical Triangle ==
=== Rhetor ===
The screen narrator in Bontoc Eulogy can be thought of as the rhetor. This narrator is an ever-present voice in the film and guides the viewer through the plot and story line. Although we never learn the name of this narrator, it is (at first) speculated that this is indeed Marlon Fuentes (the director). But, at the end of the film, the audience realizes that this film is indeed fictional and the rhetor is a nameless narrator only played by Marlon Fuentes. This twist and mystery which surrounds the rhetor is, in itself, an aid for the audience to inadvertently understand the narrator's (and the Filipino-American population's) personal struggle to piece together his past and find a sense of belonging and stability in life. The anonymous narrator also remains ambiguous to allow every Filipino-American Immigrant to relate to this story and struggle. Through this film the narrator explores his own relationship with his Filipino culture and ancestry.

=== Message ===
Marlon Fuentes unfolds the events of the St. Louis World's Fair in 1904. He does this by fabricating a story about the search for a grandfather who mysteriously vanished during the events of the fair. The story was simply created to help the mockumentary attract and keep the attention of the audience. This film not only shows the awful history of the St. Louis World Fair but also the reactions of many Americans to the Filipino people at the fair. The Filipinos were treated like animals with absolutely no respect. Viewers of this film can be compared to the spectators at the World's Fair. We are so quick to believe that many Filipinos were “barbaric” and “savage” at this time, but the truth is they were just portrayed this way at the World Fair to show how “uncivilized” non-white races are.

=== Audience ===
Bontoc Eulogy is meant for both a general audience and also specifically for the Filipino audience, although it also targets audiences interested in American history, ethnographic film, and experimental documentary. Fuentes chooses to "mislead" his audience at the beginning of the film by fabricating a story that will intrigue audiences. He says that his grandfather was a victim of the St. Louis Worlds Fair, but in reality, this may never have happened. Instead, it was a narrative device used to focus attention on traditions of displaying indigenous tribal culture in Western civilization. Although the audience may feel "cheated" at the end of the movie, they are still left with the realization that there is a logical possibility someone else could have faced a similar tragic predicament. Fuentes, in an interview, explains that he did not want to reveal the truth within the film because it was essential for him to retain the audience’s attention through the “raw material” ethnography and emotions generated by the story. Furthermore, to break the façade too early would have distracted the audience and drawn away from his message. Not much is known of the first audience’s original reception of Bontoc Eulogy, but current viewers suggest that it is a film that all Filipino and Philippine diaspora audiences must watch. New viewers are continually promoting Bontoc Eulogy in order to keep the Filipino history alive and to create awareness of what western civilization did to early Filipino immigrants. Overall, Bontoc Eulogy continues to receive critical acclaim from general and academic audiences for its portrayal of the St. Louis World's Fair, at the same time interrogating the relationships between the formal issues of documentary form and the presentation historical "truth."

== Genre ==
Bontoc Eulogy is a film often mistaken as a nonfiction, documentary. Although this film employs many of the techniques commonly used in a traditional documentary, it is, more precisely, a unique fusion of autoethnographic and Brechtian cinema. The elements used to create this feel are: a narrative voiceover through the entire film, black and white images, foreign languages used and then (re)translated, and blending a "personal" voice that foreshadows the possibility of an unreliable narrator dissecting the colonial narratives embedded in the 1904 World's Fair.

This experimental/brechtian film is targeted towards an interrogation of the colonial metanarrative in a historical moment at the turn of the century. It uses avant-garde techniques such as distantiation, bricolage, metafiction, the interplay of diegetic and non-diegetic sound, and appropriation/recontextualization strategies used in the visual arts. As such, the film highlights the fetishization (and the "fetish infrastructure") by dominant Western societies towards "other" indigenous/colonized cultures. The "West" here is shown to take the culture of the Filipino people and other indigenous societies, completely change and misconstrue it (recasting the cultural narrative to fit sociopolitical and economic objectives of Empire), and then to exhibit this tableau/facade/platform in front of millions, who believe that it is real, all to support and perpetuate the rubric of U.S. Manifest Destiny.

== Themes ==
=== Repetition ===
Fuentes repeats many scenes of the grandfather while he is held captive in the World's Fair. He also repeats many scenes of the Igorot, along with other tribes, mock-fighting and playing instruments. Another prominent scene which is repeated is the scene with the paper boats floating in the water.

Fuentes repeats these scenes for the purpose of stressing the fact that the Igorot and Filipino people were, in a sense, held captive in the St. Louis World's Fair and that each day seemed the same to them; performing an act, being watched, and dreaming of their families back in the Philippines. The scene of the paper bloats floating is also crucial although it may appear to be superfluous at first sight. This scene includes the element of water, a symbol of refreshment and rebirth, and puts paper boats in it, which can be interpreted as a symbol of the "West". The boats are paper, so it signifies that the Filipino people had come to the United States in hopes of earning money for their families and creating a better life for themselves, but were only met with the unstable and inhospitable American environment and people.

=== Children ===
The narrator continuously talks about his children throughout the film, but most prominently during the beginning of the film when he is reflecting on his own childhood and upbringing. Fuentes also edits clips of two children playing at various points in the film and leaves audiences with a nostalgic feel of childhood. The narrator's own grandfather had left for the World's Fair while his wife was pregnant and about to have a baby. Adding on, there was also a very prominent clip of a child dancing in a "traditional" way. This clip was slowed down for emphasis and played for a prolonged amount of time while the narrator mused of his own childhood in the United States and the cruelty (or ignorance) of the children there towards his culture.

This theme of children in the movie highlights the innocence of the Filipino people when they lived in their personal civilization, before it was touched by Western influence. The stress that Fuentes puts on the simplicity yet complexity of the peaceful Filipino way of living is recognized with the easily seen display of innocence by using small children in many of his scenes.
