= Victor Wood =

Filipino singer, actor, and politician (1946–2021)

- Wood in 2020

Background information
- Born: Victor Nobleza Wood; February 1, 1946; Buhi, Camarines Sur, Philippines
- Died: April 23, 2021 (aged 75) Quezon City, Philippines
- Genres: Manila sound; OPM
- Occupations: Singer; actor; politician
- Years active: 1960s–2021
- Labels: Vicor Music; Plaka Pilipino (1970–1977); Alpha Music Corporation; D' Concorde Recording Corp; VIVA Records

Victor Nobleza Wood (February 1, 1946 – April 23, 2021) (Note: Sources of his age at the time of his death vary whether he was 74 or 75.) was a Filipino singer, actor and politician. His voice earned him various titles, including "Jukebox King" and "Plaka King".

Before becoming a singer, Wood starred in some productions of Sampaguita Pictures. He was a member of Iglesia ni Cristo. He previously hosted the show Beautiful Sunday every Sunday on the Iglesia ni Cristo-owned Net25.

Wood died on April 23, 2021, due to COVID-19 complications.

== Early life ==
Victor Nobleza Wood was born on February 1, 1946, in Buhi, Camarines Sur, Philippines to Sgt. Kocky Wood and Rosario "Tiyang Saring" Nobleza. His mother was well known in Buhi and neighboring towns for selling herbal medications and perfumes. He studied and finished secondary school at Jose Abad Santos High.

== Musical career ==
Wood's voice earned him various titles, including Jukebox King and Plaka King in the 1970s when his career bloomed.

In 1972, Wood released his third album In Despair. He became a very popular singer of that era and recorded many albums for Vicor Records. In Despair is an album of cover versions of popular English songs from the 1950s and 1960s. Three songs on the album, namely "Jenny Jenny", "Rip It Up" and "Good Golly Miss Molly", were originally hits for Little Richard in the 1950s. The album has a combination of slow and fast songs, and the slow ballads include "In Despair", "Vaya Con Dios", "Have a Good Time", "Hurt" and "Return to Me". The album's ballads are highly favorable to karaoke singing, and a number of them are still heard in karaoke nightspots. Among the album's upbeat songs are versions of Roy Orbison's "Pretty Woman", Gene Vincent's "Be-Bop-a-Lula" and Del Shannon's "Runaway".

In 1974, Wood released his eleventh album, Ihilak. Eleven of the album's 12 songs are Philippine folk love songs sung in the Visayan language. The remaining song, "Gugma Ko", uses the melody of Neil Diamond's "Song Sung Blue" and replaces the original English lyrics with Visayan-language ones.

In 1979, Wood covered the Indonesian version of "Anak" from the fellow Filipino original artist Freddie Aguilar.

Wood and his family migrated to the United States in the late 1970s.

== Acting career ==
Aside from singing, Wood was also an actor who starred in various films until 1979.

== Later life and death ==
Wood ran for the Senate of the Philippines during the 2007 Philippine general election under the KBL banner, but lost.

According to his third wife, Nerissa, Wood died of complications from COVID-19 on April 23, 2021.

== Personal life ==
Wood had two children with his second wife, Ofelia Mercado Ponce, whom he met during his stay in the United States. The couple had a son, Simon, and a daughter, Sydney Victoria.

== Electoral history ==
Electoral history of Victor Wood
Year	Office	Party	Votes received				Result
Year	Office	Party	Total	%	P.	Swing	Result
2007	Senator of the Philippines	KBL	283,036	0.96%	34th	—N/a	Lost

== Discography ==
=== Albums ===
==== Studio albums ====
- I'm Sorry My Love (June 1970, Vicor)
- Mr. Lonely (1971)
- In Despair (1972)
- Memories (1972)
- 14 Bestsellers
- Blue Christmas
- Knock on Wood
- His Majesty
- Victor Wood Music
- Wood, I Love You
- Ihilak (1974, Plaka Pilipino)
- Pilipino
- Kalyehon 29
- Love Is
- Wooden Heart
- Sincerely
- Follow Me
- Karon or Visayan Hitsongs Collection Vol. 2
- Moods
- Victor Wood (1979, Blackgold)
- Bintana ng Puso
- Kumusta Ka, Mahal
- If I See You Again
- Padre
- Inday ng Buhay Ko
- You're My Everything (1997, Alpha Music Corporation)
- Victor Wood: Ngayon (2002, VIVA Records)

==== Compilation albums ====
- Special Collectors Edition: Malupit Na Pag-ibig (1994, Vicor)
- Special Collectors Edition: Mr. Lonely (1994, Vicor)
- Carmelita 4CD: Vicor Music 40th Anniversary Collection (2006, Vicor)
- Special Collectors Edition: You Are My Destiny (2008, Vicor)
- 18 Greatest Hits: Victor Wood (2009, Vicor)

==== Live albums ====
- One Man Show

==== Collaboration albums ====
- Jukebox King & Queen (with Imelda Papin) (1999, D'Concorde)

=== Songs ===
- "Love Can Fly"
- "Take My Hand for a While"
- "Oh My Love"
- "I Don't Want Your Lovin' Anymore"
- "Here's My Happiness"
- "I'm Gonna Make You Mine"
- "Smoke Gets in Your Eyes"
- "The Great Pretender"
- "Tiny Bubbles"
- "The Miracle of Christmas"
- "Young and Beautiful"
- "For Mama"
- "Rock Around the Clock"
- "Rock Your Baby"
- "Dick and Jane"
- "Don't Cry Joni"
- "Where Can She Be"
- "Pagbati (Feelings)"
- "Love Is a Pain in the Heart"
- "Let's Sing a Christmas Song"
- "Anak" (Indonesian Version; Original in Tagalog by Freddie Aguilar)
- "Carmelita"
