= Eddie Peregrina =

Filipino singer

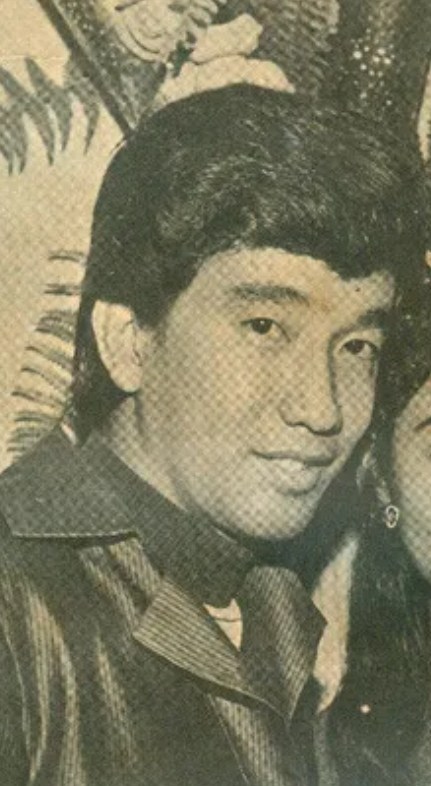
- Peregrina in 1971
- Born: Edgard Villavicencio Peregrina; November 11, 1945; Manila, Philippine Commonwealth
- Died: April 30, 1977 (aged 31); Mandaluyong City, Metro Manila, Philippines
- Resting place: Manila Memorial Park – Sucat
- Occupations: Singer, actor
- Years active: 1966–1977
- Label: Vicor
- Spouse: Evelyn Salazar
- Children: 3

Edgard Villavicencio Peregrina (November 10, 1945 – April 30, 1977), better known as Eddie Peregrina, was a Filipino singer and matinee idol of the 1970s. Dubbed as "The Original Jukebox King", he was most famous for hit songs such as "What Am I Living For", "Together Again", "Two Lovely Flowers" and "Mardy", among others. He died at the peak of his popularity at the age of 31, one month after a car accident on EDSA in Mandaluyong.

== Biography ==
He was born as Edgard Villavicencio Peregrina on November 10, 1945 to Octavio Peregrina of Pililla, Rizal Province and Nena Villavicencio of Cebu. Eddie started singing in amateur contests as a young child. He won the singing contest of DZXL's "Tita Betty's Children Show" at the age of six. After he graduated at Villamor High School in 1963, he became a professional singer, working as a vocalist for some bands, most notably the Blinkers Band in Japan. His biggest break came when he won the singing contest of Tawag ng Tanghalan, a popular TV variety show of the '60s and '70s.

== Singing style ==
Peregrina's unusually high-pitched voice distinguished him from the rest of popular singers who, at the time, were mostly influenced by the low-pitched, smooth voices of international singers like Matt Monro and Frank Sinatra. He had a habit of tipping his feet backwards to hit the highest note.

== Showbiz ==
Peregrina's popularity was high, particularly among masses. Jukebox, the coin-operated machine which plays selected music, was said to have attained much popularity as well because of continuous requests of Peregrina's songs. His fame surge even more among the Filipino masses when he became movie star, cast with the leading ladies of the 1970s, including Esperanza Fabon, Vilma Santos and Nora Aunor, with whom he had a TV show entitled The Eddie-Nora Show on Channel 9 in the 1960s. Among his movies included Mardy and Memories of Our Dreams with Esperanza Fabon. He co-starred with his wife Lyn Salazar in Batul of Mactan in 1974. He was also the leading man in Dito sa Aking Puso (1970) with Nora Aunor and with Vilma Santos in Mardy. Most of his films were produced by JBC Productions, which invariably paired him with Vilma Santos, Edgar Mortiz, Esperanza Fabon, and directed by Consuelo P. Osorio. When not busy attending show business commitments, he managed his own business, including Edviper Records and the Pervil Photo Studio.

== Personal life ==
Peregrina was married to actress Evelyn Salazar, with whom he had two daughters, Edlyn and Michelle. And had also a son named Raymund de Leon to his former manager.

== Death ==
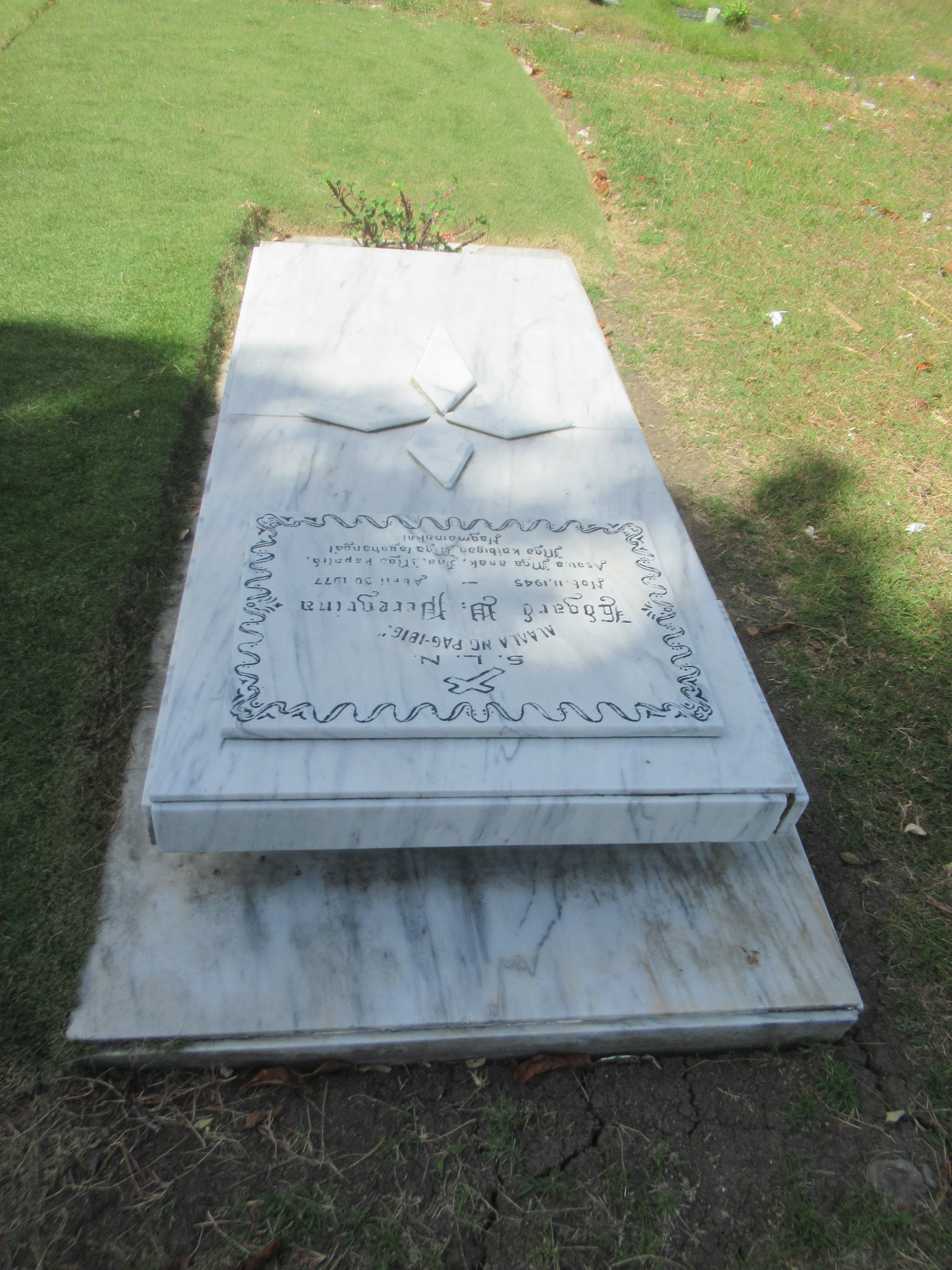
Peregrina's grave at Manila Memorial Park – Sucat.

Peregrina was involved in a car accident in March 1977 when his Ford Mustang collided with a trailer truck on the EDSA-Shaw underpass. He died a month and a week later (April 30, 1977) at the age of 31 at Polymedic Hospital due to internal hemorrhage caused by the accident.

== Filmography ==
=== Film ===
- 1968 – Gigolo, Gigolet: Nagkagulo, Nagkagalit!
- 1969 – Halina Neneng Ko
- 1969 – My Darling Eddie
- 1969 – Mardy
- 1969 – The Jukebox King
- 1969 – Halina Neneng Ko
- 1969 – Fiesta Extravaganza
- 1969 – Your Love
- 1970 – Mardy
- 1970 – What Am I Living For
- 1970 – Songs and Lovers
- 1970 – Memories of Our Dream
- 1970 – I Adore You
- 1970 – Edong
- 1971 – Luha sa Bawa't Awit
- 1971 – Alaala ng Pag-ibig
- 1972 – I Do Love You
- 1974 – Batul of Mactan
- 1976 – Gold Cross

=== Television ===
- 1970 – The Eddie-Nora Show

== Discography ==
=== Albums ===
==== Studio albums ====
- What Am I Living For (1968, D'Swan)
- Encore (1968, D'Swan)
- Christmas Greetings (1968, D'Swan)
- Love Mood (1969, D'Swan)
- Eddie Peregrina at His Best (1969, D'Swan)
- Eddie (1969, D'Swan)
- The Jukebox King (1969, D'Swan)
- Lonely Boy (1970, D'Swan)
- Old Time Favorites (1970, D'Swan)
- Irog, Ako ay Mahalin (1976, Plaka Pilipino)
- Our Wedding Song (with Lyn Salazar) (1976, Pioneer)
- Especially for You (1976, Pioneer)

==== Compilation albums ====
- Eddie Peregrina's Greatest Hits (1969, D'Swan)
- Hanggang sa Dulo ng Walang Hanggan (1977, Plaka Pilipino)
- Huling Paalam Ni Eddie Peregrina (1981, Valley Records)
- 16 Golden Love Songs: I Can't Believe Vol. 1 (1988, Aquarius Records)
- 14 Golden Love Songs: Dearest Love/I Am Blue Vol. 2 (with Willy Rio and El Masculino) (1994, Aquarius Records)
- Special Collector's Edition: Hanggang sa Dulo ng Walang Hanggan (1995, Vicor)
- Special Collector's Edition: What Am I Living For (1995, Vicor)
- Special Collector's Edition: Memories of Our Dreams (1995, Vicor)
- Special Collector's Edition: Send Someone to Love Me (2001, Vicor)
- Memories... (2005, Vicor)
- 18 Greatest Hits: Eddie Peregrina Vol. 1 (2009, Vicor)
- 18 Greatest Hits: Eddie Peregrina Vol. 2 (2009, Vicor)

=== Songs ===
- "Will You Still Love Me Tomorrow"
- "Say Yeah, Say No"
- "Hang On Sloopy (Jerk)"
- "Blue Eyes"
- "My Happiness"
- "You Only Live Twice"
- "Midnight Caravan"
- "Bare Footin'"
- "Top Twenty"
- "Dark Side of Love"
- "I Need Somebody"
- "Girl"
- "Kokotsu No Blues (I Feel Blue)"
- "Itsumademo (Forever)"
- "Our Love Was Born"
- "No More Tears to Fall"
- "I'm Gonna Find Myself a Girl"
- "Matador"
- "Only Yesterday"
- "Mony Mony"
- "Get On Up"
- "We"
- "Legata ad un Granello"
- "Need You"
- "Don't Say Goodbye"
- "Please Love Me Now"
- "Rags to Riches"
- "My Funny Valentine"
- "Happy Happy Birthday Baby"
- "Love Me Now and Forever"
- "Cry"
- "This Song of Mine"
- "I'll Love You Forever"
- "I Can't Find the Way"
- "A World Without Love"
- "Where Is Tomorrow"
- "Goodbye My Old Gal"
- "Didn't You Say"
- "Oh Promise Me"
- "I Promise You"
- "Your Love"
- "Mother Song"
- "Two Timer"
- "On Your Wedding Day"
- "Happy Birthday My Love"
- "Now and Forever"
- "Dusty Road"
- "I'm a Drifter"
- "If Ever You're Lonely"
- "Sighin' Sighin'"
- "Pledging My Love"
- "Love Me Espie"
- "Matapat na Pag-Ibig" (duet with Nora Aunor)
- "Truly"
- "Poor Lonely Me"
- "Why Must I?"
- "I Love You and You Love Me"
- "The Music Played"
- "Mother of Mine"
- "Going Back to Indiana"
- "Ben"
- "Blueberry Hill"
- "A Time for Us"
- "Love Is a Beautiful Thing"
- "Baby I Love You"
- "Sweet Pea"
- "I'll Never Love Again"
- "Blue Day"
- "Be True"
- "Forget Me"
- "I Can't Believe"
- "Why"
- "I Am Blue"
- "Lost Love"
- "Mañanita"
- "Buhay Binata"
- "Pag-Ibig (The End of the World)"
- "Pag-ibig ay Ginhawa"
- "Ano Man ang Kasasapitan"
- "Sa Langitnong Himaya"
- "Sa Pahiyum Mo Lamang"
- "Never Leave Me“
- "Birthday“
- "I Don't Care“

== Awards ==
| Year | Award giving body | Category | Nominated work | Results |
|---|---|---|---|---|
| 1969 | Awit Awards | Male Recording Artist of the Year | —N/a | Won |
| 1970 | Awit Awards | Best Male Singer | —N/a | Won |
