= Louie Castro =

Hong Kong Macanese actor

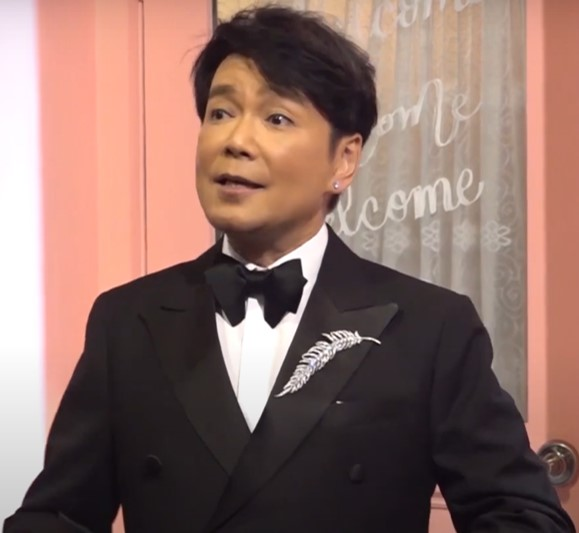
Louie Castro in 2019

Louie Castro (traditional Chinese: 賈思樂; simplified Chinese: 贾思乐; born 1 October 1954) is a Macau-born Hong Kong Macanese actor, singer and disc jockey. He was born into a family of Portuguese-Chinese heritage, and is active in the entertainment industry in television shows, dramas, films, and music recordings.

== Family ==
Louie Castro was born in Macau on 1 October 1954, to a Shanghainese mother and a Portuguese-Chinese father. His father died when he was seven. His mother died in the late 1970s when he worked in Taiwan; he lost his job opportunity in Taiwan after mourning his mother.

== Career ==
He won the singing contest show Sharp Night (聲寶之夜) in 1974. After winning the show, he was discovered by the director Kam Kwok-leung. Castro took a lead role in the television series Shao Nian Shi Wu Er Shi Shi. He released several music records after that.

He became famous when he joined the drama Ha Chai Daddy in the long-running entertainment show Enjoy Yourself Tonight.
