= Max Surban =

Filipino singer (born 1939)

- Born: May 15, 1939 (age 87); Cebu City, Cebu, Commonwealth of the Philippines
- Genres: Novelty, comedy
- Occupation: Singer-songwriter
- Instruments: Vocals, guitar
- Years active: 1968–present
- Labels: Vicor Music; Universal Records; Star Music (music rights)
- Website: https://www.maxsurban.net/

Maximo Castro Surban (born May 15, 1939) is a Filipino singer and songwriter from Cebu. He has been given the title the "King of Visayan Songs". Although known primarily for his singing of novelty songs, he has also recorded romantic ballads.

Like his fellow Visayan, the Bol-anon singer Yoyoy Villame, Max Surban has also become famous for his singing of novelty songs. On several occasions, both Yoyoy Villame and Max Surban have appeared together on stage and even recorded together with a few albums. They were also in the Pamilya Ukay-OKay comedy TV show in Cebu.

Max wrote most of his own songs and, at the time of this writing, has made more than 30 albums. He also wrote and sang Tagalog songs.

"Ang Tao'y Marupok", the Rico J. Puno song was composed by Max Surban and Ernie Dela Peña. He wrote songs for Pilita Corrales, including duets they performed together, such as "Kon Magkabulag Ta", "Gugmang Dinali-Dali", "Pagbantay Gyud Inday" and "Diyos Ko Day".

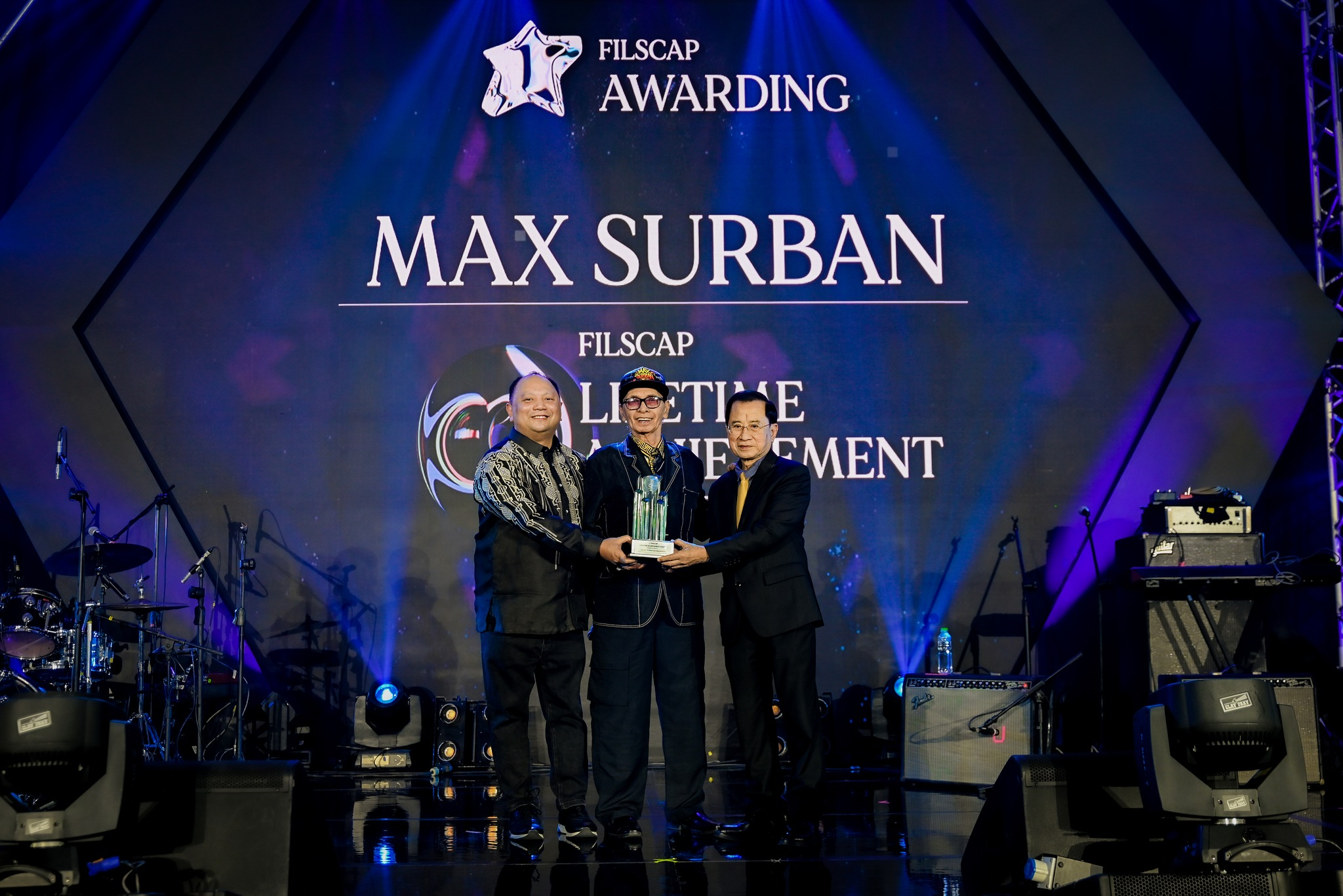
A True Icon of Visayan Music

== Awards ==
Below are some of Max's awards and honours:

- Cecil Award 1983 - Ako Na Gud Ni for Best Visayan Recording, Best Visayan Composition, Best Visayan Producer
- Two Awit Award for "Regional Song Recording"
- Nabali Ang Kristmas Tree – Platinum Record Award and Gold Record Award (Sunshine)
- Mad Mad Kuno – Gold Record Award (Sunshine)
- Vendors Boogie – Platinum Record Award (Sunshine)
- Apir Apri Apir -Gold Record Award (Sunshine)
- Ang Trato Ko – Gold Record Award (Vicor)
- Max Surban Medley – Platinum Record Award (Vicor)
- Bahandi Lifetime Achievement Award
- Filscap Lifetime Achievement Award

== Recognitions ==
In 2019, Surban was recognized as one of the Top 100 Cebuano personalities by The Freeman, Cebu's longest-running newspaper. He was recognized alongside Tomas Osmeña, Resil Mojares, and Rubilen Amit as part of the centennial anniversary of the local newspaper.

Max Surban receives Lifetime Achievement Award

TVJ, Nonoy Tan and Max Surban feted with FILSCAP’s Lifetime Achievement Award

Max Surban is a Philippine Music Icon and Legend
