= Butse Kik =

1980 song performed by Yoyoy Villame

"Butse Kik" (also spelled as "Buchikik" or "Abuchikik" or "Butsikik") is a 1980 novelty song by Yoyoy Villame that is widely regarded as one of his hits in the Philippines, becoming a radio staple. The song title was originally released by Villame in 1971 as "Vietcong Palagdas", which he performed with the Embees and the MB Rondalla Band through Kinampay Records.

The music and the concept itself is a parody of the song "Baby Cakes" by the American singer Dee Dee Sharp, released in 1962. "Butse Kik" ("buche cake") is a play on the title "Baby Cakes". In Filipino cuisine, "butse", "buche" "butsi" or "buchi" is a deep-fried pastry made of sticky rice flour with sweet red bean filling. The song consists of gibberish nonsense lyrics that sound vaguely like Hokkien Chinese which the Chinese community in Cebu took umbrage and demanded that it be removed from jukeboxes as the song's faux-Chinese lyrics were perceived to be racially insensitive, but according to Villame, a plan to bring the case to court failed because the complainants could not identify a single Chinese word in the song, as it was all a mispronounced rendition of various ungrammatical Hokkien Chinese words.

== See also ==
- Copy thachin, a type of music in Myanmar that uses melodies from international songs with added Burmese lyrics
