= Freddie Aguilar =

Filipino musician (1953–2025)

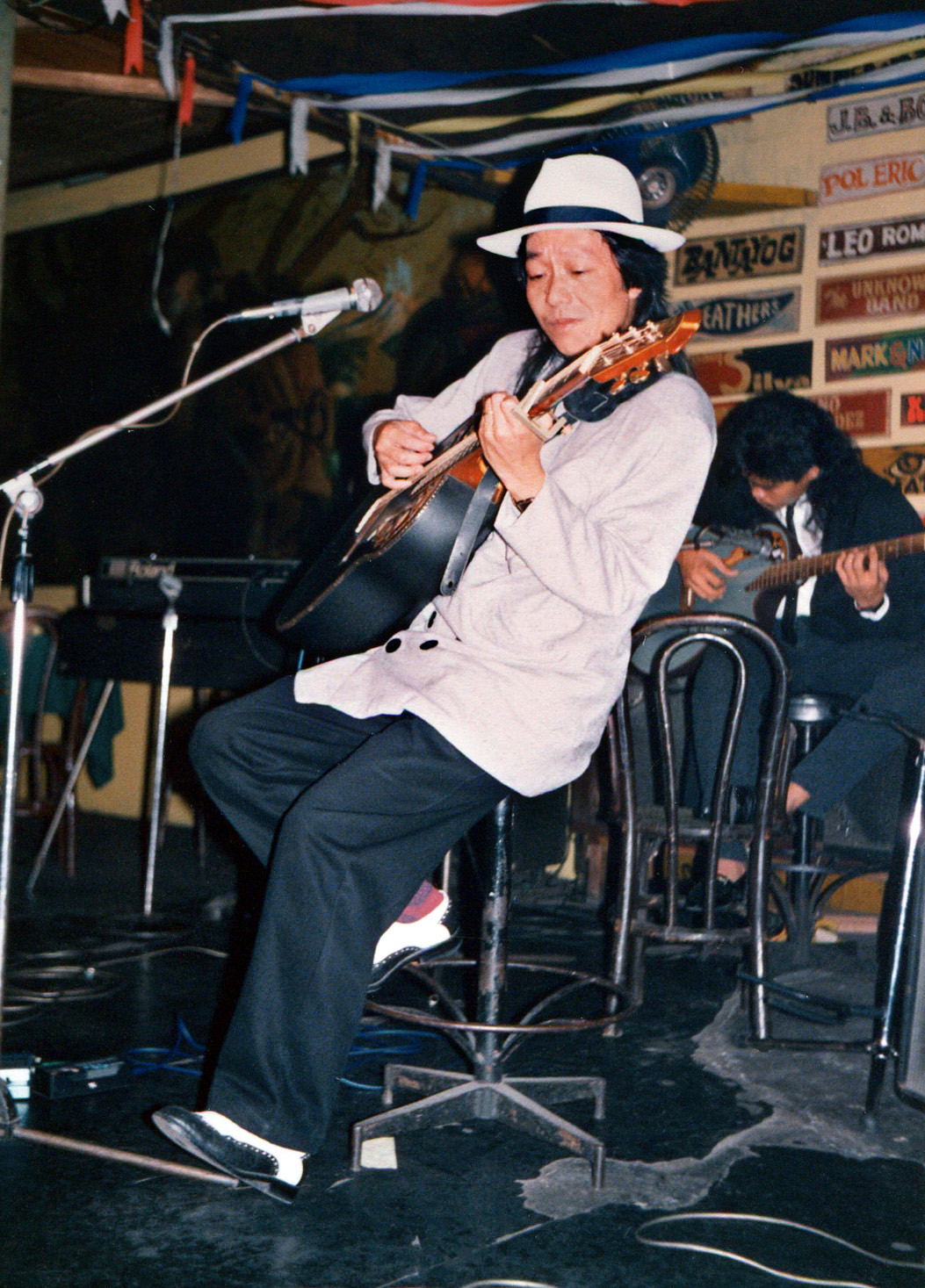
- Aguilar performing in 1988
- Born: Ferdinand Pascual Aguilar; February 5, 1953; Santo Tomas, Isabela, Philippines
- Died: May 27, 2025 (aged 72); Quezon City, Philippines
- Burial place: Manila Islamic Cemetery
- Other name: Abdul Farid
- Occupations: Musician; singer; songwriter
- Years active: 1973–2025
- Political party: Partido Federal ng Pilipinas
- Spouses: Marilyn Angelo (annulled); Josephine Queipo (m. 1978; div. 2000); Antonette Martinez (m. 2000; div. 2005); Jovie Albao (m. 2013)
- Partner: Marilyn Angelo (separated)
- Children: 6 (4 with Queipo)
- Musical career
- Genres: Folk; Manila sound; OPM
- Instruments: Vocals; guitar; bass guitar
- Labels: Vicor Music/Sunshine; RCA Star Music (music rights)

Ferdinand "Freddie" Pascual Aguilar (Tagalog: [pɐsˈkwal ʔɐgɪˈlaɾ]; February 5, 1953 – May 27, 2025), also known by his Muslim name Abdul Farid, was a Filipino musician regarded as one of the pillars and icons of Original Pilipino Music (OPM). He was best known for his international hit "Anak" (1978), which became the best-selling Philippine music record of all time, selling 33 million copies worldwide. His rendition of "Bayan Ko" became the anthem of the opposition against the regime of Ferdinand Marcos during the 1986 People Power Revolution. He was heavily associated with Pinoy rock.

== Early life ==
Aguilar was born on February 5, 1953, in Santo Tomas, Isabela. He began composing his own songs at age 14. Aguilar studied electrical engineering at De Guzman Institute of Technology but did not finish the degree program. Instead he pursued music, became a street musician, and then a folk club and bar musician. At the age of 18, Aguilar parted ways with his family and quit college; he started performing on stage at age 20. After realizing and regretting his mistakes five years after quitting college, he composed the song "Anak."

== Career ==
Aguilar first began performing in public in 1973, when he auditioned and was hired to play folk songs at ₱500 per gig at the Hobbit House in Ermita, Manila.

=== International acclaim ===
Aguilar's "Anak" not only broke the Philippine record charts in 1979, but it also hit the no. 1 spot in Japan and achieved considerable popularity in other countries as Angola, Malaysia, Hong Kong, and parts of Western Europe. The song has become so famous that, by some counts, it has been recorded in as many as a hundred versions in 23 languages throughout the world. Billboard reported that the song was the number two world hit of the 1980s. According to Billboard, Aguilar was the second best-selling recording artist of 1981 in Europe. As of 2006, it was unsurpassed as the highest-selling record in Philippine music history.

=== Political activism ===
Even before Aguilar's rendition of "Bayan Ko," Aguilar created and performed songs targeted at social injustices. His album Magdalena included the title track about a girl forced into prostitution due to poverty, and "Mindanao", about the Christian-Muslim clashes in that island. After the album, Aguilar also sang about the injustices suffered by the powerless, poverty, and the arrogance of superpowers in a song titled "U.S.A., Russia"

Five years after the composition of "Anak", Aguilar joined protests against the Marcos regime and began writing and performing songs that criticized the excesses of the government. Some of the songs that caused him to be banned from mainstream media include: "Kata-rungan" (lit. 'Justice') speaking for the unjustly accused, "Pangako" (lit. 'Promise') a leader's unfulfilled pledges to an abandoned people, and "Luzviminda", a portmanteau for the country's three major island groups—Luzon, Visayas, and Mindanao—calling on Filipinos to wake up to the reality of oppression. One of the songs he was most remembered for during that time was his interpretation of "Bayan Ko" (lit. 'My Country'), in which he added a verse to the original piece.

=== "Bayan Ko" (My Country) ===
In 1978, Aguilar first recorded "Bayan Ko" in a patriotic effort to, in his words, "jolt back those who were starting to forget who we really are." He also provided a rendition of the song as it was inspiring and gave him excitement and a surge of power. The song was originally composed in 1928 by Constancio de Guzman, with lyrics by poet Jose Corazon de Jesus, during a time of struggle for Philippine independence from US occupation. It emerged once again during the Marcos regime as the unofficial anthem of the emergent "people" of the "People Power", the new democratic nation opposed to authoritarianism that was widely credited with the deposing of Ferdinand Marcos. In 1983, the assassination of Benigno "Ninoy" Aquino triggered massive demonstrations against the Marcos dictatorship, and Aguilar's rendition of "Bayan Ko" was blared on the radio and speakers mounted on jeepneys throughout the streets of Manila and the provinces of the Philippines. At the funeral of Senator Aquino, Freddie Aguilar sang "Bayan Ko" and felt that Aquino was a man of action who even gave his life for the freedom of the Philippines. During the performance, Freddie Aguilar did not feel scared anymore and felt strong and confident. He then decided to join the cause as well. Aguilar, along with APO Hiking Society and other Pinoy pop musicians who took a stand against dictatorship, joined other protest singers in music and street performances as part of the anti-Marcos rallies.

A few years later, Aguilar campaigned for the presidential candidacy of Corazon Aquino in the national election that would lead to the 1986 revolt.

Aguilar mentioned in an interview with ABS-CBN News that the lyrics of the song combines the love the Filipinos have for their country, commemorate the Aquino family, and commitment to the country. Even in this modern time, Filipinos will identify "Bayan Ko" as the nation's protest anthem.

=== Later life ===
He ran for mayor of Quezon City in 1988, but lost the elections.

On January 18, 2008, Aguilar received the Asia Star Award from the Asia Model Award Festival in South Korea. Aguilar still lived in the Philippines, and continued to perform. He moved to his own place dubbed "Ka Freddie's". He always had a strong following in the Philippines and among many Filipinos living overseas. Aguilar advocated for the creation of a new department called the "Department of Culture and Arts." During the campaign and subsequent inauguration of President Rodrigo Duterte, Aguilar performed "Para sa Tunay na Pagbabago", which was one of Duterte's campaign jingles to the tune of "Ipaglalaban Ko". Aguilar was President Duterte's favorite singer. Aguilar ran for senator in 2019. Though running as an independent candidate, his candidacy was endorsed by President Duterte. However, he lost, placing 30th out of 12 seats up for election. In his later years, Aguilar served as National Executive Vice President of the Partido Federal ng Pilipinas.

== Artistry ==
Aguilar is a key figure of Pinoy rock. He has cited British and American folk-rock stars like Cat Stevens and James Taylor as musical influences. His works emphasize themes of Filipino heritage, nationalist feelings, and tried to constitute a musical exploration of the Filipino ethos.

Aguilar's signature look was a fedora over his long hair.

== Personal life ==
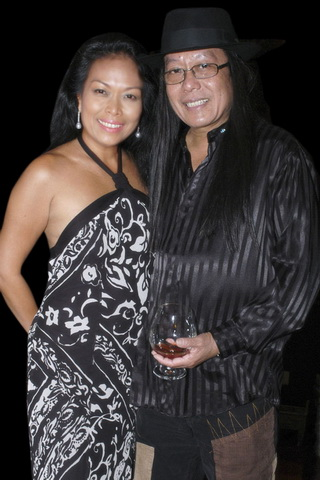
Aguilar with his sister Marlene, circa 2002

=== Romantic relationships and children ===
Aguilar married Marilyn Angelo in Olongapo. However this marriage was void since the priest did not have an appropriate license. After his voided union with Angelo, Aguilar married Josephine Queipo in London but later separated in 1997. The marriage lasted for 22 years until Aguilar divorced Queipo. In the late 1990s, Aguilar became the boyfriend of then-17 year old Antonette Martinez. At age 19, Martinez married Aguilar in Las Vegas in 2000. They divorced after five years.

Throughout his life, Aguilar fathered six children with three different women. Four of them are with Queipo. This includes Maegan who became a rock singer in the 1990s.

On October 17, 2013, Aguilar openly admitted, in spite of controversy that followed, that he was in a relationship with a 16-year-old girl, Jovie Gatdula Albao (Muslim name: Sittie Mariam), with plans to marry and even have children, as Albao insisted she was willing to have a baby.

On November 22, 2013, Aguilar, under Islamic rites, married Albao in Buluan in present-day Maguindanao del Sur. Aguilar had converted to Islam six months prior to these reports, so that he could wed his then 16-year-old girlfriend under the Muslim Family Code of the Philippines.

=== Religion ===
Aguilar was born into a Catholic family. Already a famous musician, he joined the Born Again Christian community until the late 2000s, and was a self-described "Born-Again Catholic". He then converted to Islam in April 2013 – some months prior to marrying his last wife, Albao, and taking the name "Abdul Farid". He spoke about his conversion at the 14th Dubai Ramadan Forum in June 2015 in Dubai which also featured preacher Sheikh Nadhir Oquindo.

=== 2018 fire ===
On January 3, 2018, Aguilar's residence in North Fairview, Quezon City, was destroyed by a fire, which was reported to have started in his music room. The fire destroyed most of Aguilar's valuables estimated at ₱15 million, including his art collection, awards, musical instruments, records, and other personal memorabilia. Aguilar was at his restobar, Ka Freddie's, along Tomas Morato Avenue, during the fire. There were no casualties in the fire.

== Death ==
Aguilar died from multiple organ failure at the Philippine Heart Center in Quezon City, on May 27, 2025, at the age of 72. In accordance with Islamic rites, he was buried that same day at Manila Islamic Cemetery (a part of Manila South Cemetery).

== Discography ==
=== Studio albums ===
Year	Title	Record label
1978	Anak	Vicor Music/Sunshine
1979	Freddie Aguilar	PDU
1980	Diyosa	Ugat Tunog ng Lahi/Vicor Music
1980	Freddie Aguilar (US release)	RCA Records
1983	Magdalena	G. Records International
1987	Freddie Aguilar – Anak – Double "Best Of" Album	Panarecord International
1987	EDSA	Ivory Music
1988	Sariling Atin	Alpha Music
1989	Hala Bira	Alpha Music
1990	Heart of Asia	OctoArts International
1991	Freddie Aguilar	AMP
1992	Kumusta Ka,	Aguilar Music, Vicor Music
1992	Pagbabalik Himig	Vicor Music
1993	Minamahal Kita	Alpha Music
1994	Anak (CD re-issue)	Vicor Music
1994	Diwa ng Pasko	Alpha Music
2000	Greencard	D'Concorde Recording

=== Compilation albums ===
Year	Title	Record label
1992	Fifteen Years of Freddie Aguilar: Vol. 1 and Vol. 2	Aguilar Music
1995	The Best of Freddie Aguilar	Alpha Music
1997	Freddie Aguilar ...Live! Global Tour	Aguilar Music, Vicor Music

== Singles ==
In chronological order:

- 1976 "Alaala"
- 1978 "Anak"
- 1978 "Bayan Ko"
- 1980 "Pulubi"
- 1980 "Bulag, Pipi at Bingi"
- 1981 "Ang Buhay Nga Naman Ng Tao"
- 1983 "Magdalena"
- 1983 "Mindanao"
- 1984 "Pinoy"
- 1985 "Mga Bata Sa Negros"
- 1985 "Ipaglalaban Ko"
- 1986 "Katarungan"
- 1987 "'Di Ka Nag-iisa"
- 1988 "Estudyante Blues"
- 1989 "Luzviminda"
- 1989 "Pangako"
- 1992 "Kumusta Ka"
- 1993 "Minamahal Kita"
- 1994 "Pasko ang Damdamin"
- 1994 "Sa Paskong Darating"
- 1994 "Himig Pasko"
- 1994 "Diwa Ng Pasko"
- 1994 "Pasko Na Naman Kaibigan"
- 1994 "Mga Pilipino Kong Mahal"
- 1994 "Ang Bansa Kong Maligaya"

== Awards ==
Year	Award-giving body	Category	Nominated work	Results
1992	Ampex Corporation	Ampex Golden Reel Award	"Kumusta Ka"	Won
1993	6th Awit Awards	Dangal ng Musikang Pilipino	—N/a	Won
1994	NU Rock Awards	Rock Achievement Award	—N/a	Won
2001	Pinoy Musika Awards	Special Citation	"Anak"	Won

== Electoral history ==
Electoral history of Freddie Aguilar
Year	Office	Party	Votes received				Result
Year	Office	Party	Total	%	P.	Swing	Result
2019	Senator of the Philippines	Independent	2,580,230	5.46%	30th	—N/a	Lost

== See also ==
- Philippine folk music
- People Power Revolution
