= Vicor Music =

Philippine record label

Vicor Music Corporation
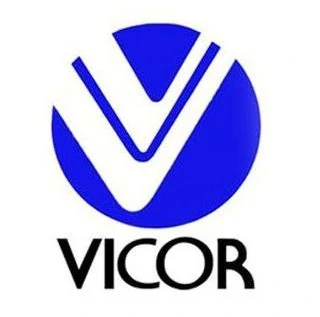
- Company logo
- Parent company: Viva Music Group
- Founded: 1966
- Founder: Vic del Rosario; Orly Ilacad
- Status: Active
- Distributor: self-distributed
- Genre: P-pop; OPM
- Country of origin: Philippines
- Location: Pasig, Philippines
- Official website: vivavicor.com

Vicor Music Corporation is a Filipino record label. The name is a combination of the founders' first names. It is currently owned by Viva Music Group, a subsidiary of Viva Communications.

== History ==
Vicor was found by cousins Vic del Rosario and Orly Ilacad in 1966. They bought a small office in a building along Raon. Its first talent was Orly's band Orly and The Ramrods. During its first decade, Vicor helped establish the careers of Boy Mondragon, Eddie Peregrina, Helen Gamboa, Norma Ledesma, Jeanne Young (daughter of Mila del Sol), Jose Mari Chan, Tirso Cruz III, Victor Wood, Vilma Valera, Vilma Santos and Pilita Corrales, as well as composers George Canseco, Willy Cruz, Ryan Cayabyab, Tito Sotto, Rey Valera and Louie Ocampo. In a span of few years, Vicor became the most successful independent record label in the country.

In 1977, Ilacad left Vicor due to business differences and founded OctoArts International (now known as PolyEast Records). Vicor maintained its success and established the careers of Freddie Aguilar, whose hit song "Anak" was one of the finalists in the first Metro Manila Popular Music Festival (Metropop) in 1978, and Sharon Cuneta, who was known for her hit song "Mr. DJ".

In 1980, in order to save the company, del Rosario left Vicor, which was taken over by the Cultural Center of the Philippines (CCP). The following year, he formed Viva Films, with Vicor as its music marketing partner. It released several notable soundtracks, such as Gaano Kadalas ang Minsan?, Bituing Walang Ningning and Bagets. In 1986, Viva Records was established.

Vicor kept moving forward throughout the new millennium, though far from its glory days. It was this time when it pioneered minus-one vinyl B-sides and videoke VCDs versions of the label's songs. Among its notable talents during that time is Aiza Seguerra, known for his hit song "Pagdating ng Panahon".

In 2008, Viva acquired Vicor. It is currently under Viva Music Group.

== Former subsidiaries ==
- Plaka Pilipino
- Sunshine Records
- Pioneer Records
- Blackgold Records
- Badjao Records
- Top Tunes Records
- Wilears Records
- D' Swan Records
- ANS Records
- Grandeur Records
- Ace Records
- Bullet Records
- Ugat Records
- Peak Music (Karaoke VCD)
