= Journal of Asia Adventist Seminary =

- Discipline: Christian theology
- Language: English

Publication details
- History: 1998-present
- Publisher: Adventist International Institute of Advanced Studies (Silang, Cavite, Philippines)

Standard abbreviations
- ISO 4: J. Asia Advent. Semin.

Links
- Journal homepage

Journal of Asia Adventist Seminary (JAAS) is a refereed scholarly Christian journal published by the Adventist International Institute of Advanced Studies. Formerly titled Asia Adventist Seminary Studies, it is issued twice a year from Silang, Cavite. The journal was founded in 1999 and currently has a circulation of 200 copies. AUSS publishes research articles and brief notes on the following topics: biblical archaeology and history of antiquity; Hebrew Bible; New Testament; church history of all periods; historical, biblical, and systematic theology; ethics; history of religion and mission; and selected research articles on ministry and Christian education.

Abstracts of Adventist International Institute of Advanced Studies dissertations in religion are also published. Articles appear in English. Most of the articles are written by Seventh-day Adventist scholars, many of them Theological Seminary professors. However, subject to the refereeing process, JAAS accepts articles by authors of other persuasions. Since 2014 JAAS includes reviews of significant new scholarly books in the same areas as its research articles. Articles are indexed in several scholarly bibliographical works, among which are Religion Index One and Elenchus of Biblica.

== Editors ==
- Edwin Reynolds (1998-2001)
- Kenneth Mulzac (2001-2005)
- Gerald Klingbeil (2006-2009)
- Mathilde Frey (2009-2014)
- Michael W. Campbell (2014–present)

== See also ==
- Seventh-day Adventist Church
- Adventist International Institute of Advanced Studies
