= Adventist International Institute of Advanced Studies =

Christian college in Cavite, Philippines

Adventist International Institute of Advanced Studies (AIIAS)
- Other name: AIIAS
- Type: Private, Graduate level only, K-12 International School
- Established: 1986
- Religious affiliation: Seventh-day Adventist Church
- President: Ginger Ketting-Weller, PhD
- Location: Silang, Cavite, Philippines; 14°12′15.62″N 120°58′4.54″E
- Campus: Almost 49 acres (200,000 m^{2}) of palmed tropical hills.
- Colors: Green, Gold and Black
- Website: www.aiias.edu
- Location in Luzon Location in the Philippines

The Adventist International Institute of Advanced Studies (AIIAS) (pronounced "I-Us"), is a Seventh-day Adventist graduate institution located in the Philippines, offering graduate degrees in Business, Education, Public Health, and Theology. It is a part of the Seventh-day Adventist education system, the world's second largest Christian school system.

AIIAS is composed of two schools: the Seminary and the Graduate School. The library holds over 70,000 volumes and offers print and online journal access, and provides access to standard online databases for scholarly research. It is both locally and internationally accredited.

AIIAS is located in Silang, Cavite, Philippines, about 28 miles (45 km) south of Manila, along the highway to the town of Tagaytay. The campus also houses AIIAS Academy, an international K–12 school which primarily serves the children of students, staff and faculty.

== History ==
AIIAS officially came into existence on 31 January 1986, through Philippine Presidential Decree 2021 signed by then-President Ferdinand Marcos. At its start, AIIAS was located on the campus of the Adventist University of the Philippines. In 1991, the school was moved to its current location in Lalaan I, Silang, Cavite, Philippines. On 6 October 1996, in an action taken during the Annual Council of the Adventist Church, AIIAS became an institution of the General Conference of Seventh-day Adventists. It is one of four General Conference institutions; the other three include the Adventist University of Africa, Andrews University, and Loma Linda University.

The AIIAS Division of Online Learning was established in 2001. AIIAS was one of the first Adventist educational institutions to confer master's degrees on students who complete their program entirely online, and became the very first Seventh-day Adventist institution to offer a Doctor of Philosophy degree in Business.

== Academics ==
AIIAS Graduate School and Theological Seminary each comprises three departments. There is also an English Center serving non-native English-speaking students who desire to learn English as a second language. Most students matriculate into the regular academic programs upon completion of their language study, which usually takes about three months. AIIAS also awards degrees through its Division of Online Learning (DOL), and several Distance Learning Centers (DLCs) throughout the world. Students enrolled in the DOL and DLCs have options between several master's degree programs.

Consistently placing well in the rankings, AIIAS most recently ranked #25 among the Top Universities 2019 in the Philippines.

=== Theological Seminary ===
The AIIAS Theological Seminary is a center for research in the theology and mission of the Seventh-day Adventist Church. The Seminary has three departments: Applied Theology, Biblical Studies, and Theological-Historical Studies. The Seminary offers the following programs:

==== Professional programs ====
- Graduate Certificate in Ministry
- Master of Ministry (M.Min.)
- Master of Divinity (M.Div.)
- Master of Arts in Ministry (MA)
- Doctor of Ministry (D.Min.)
- Doctor of Missiology/Doctor of Intercultural Studies (DMiss/DIS)

==== Academic programs ====
- Master of Arts in Religion (MA)
- Master of Theology (Th.M.)
- Doctor of Philosophy in Religion (Ph.D.)

The Seminary publishes the Journal of Asia Adventist Seminary, a peer-reviewed academic publication including scholarly articles, critical book reviews, and shorter research notes on a variety of biblical and theological subjects.

=== Graduate school ===
The AIIAS Graduate School has three departments: Business, Education and Public Health.

Degrees awarded by the Department of Business include the Master of Business Administration (M.B.A.) with emphases in Management, Finance, and Information Technology; the Master of Science in Administration (M.S.A.) with emphases in Church Administration and Management Studies; and the Doctor of Philosophy (Ph.D.) degree in Business with emphases in Management, Finance, Accounting and Human Resource Management.

The Department of Education offers a Master of Arts in Education with emphases in Curriculum & Instruction, Educational Administration, and TESOL; and Educational Specialist degree (EdS) and Doctor of Philosophy (PhD) degrees with emphases in Curriculum & Instruction and Educational Administration. The department also offers a graduate certificate in Teaching English to Speakers of Other Languages (TESOL).

The Department of Public Health offers a Master of Public Health (M.P.H.) with emphases in Health Promotion, Health Ministry, and Nutrition.

=== Schedule ===
The official school year at AIIAS begins in August and is configured in semesters of two terms each, with an inter-semester between school years. There is a commencement service at the end of each school year in May.

== AIIAS Academy ==
AIIAS Academy is an international Seventh-day Adventist school offering instruction from kindergarten through grade 12. Its stated mission is to develop young leaders through Adventist international K–12 education, with an emphasis on spiritual growth, scholarship and service. The school uses an international curriculum based on the standards of the Seventh-day Adventist Church's North American Division, and it enrolls the children of AIIAS faculty, staff and students as well as children of area residents. Students entering above grade 3 who are not yet proficient in English may be given English as a second language instruction. After the Philippines extended basic education from grade 10 to grade 12, the academy's high school classes, which had been held in rooms attached to the campus gymnasium, moved into a new two-storey building, which was inaugurated on 20 January 2023. The building has classrooms, science laboratories, a computer lab, a maker space, a music room and a library.

=== Sports ===
The AIIAS Student Association organizes an annual Mini Olympics, a campus-wide event in which students, faculty and staff take part. Events have included basketball, volleyball, tennis, soccer, badminton and track and field, along with simple games for all ages. In the 2025 edition, held from 6 to 16 February, the events included basketball, volleyball, badminton, table tennis, tennis, chess, football and athletics, and teams earned points for attendance. It ended with the AIIAS "marathon" and a tug-of-war. Reflecting the international makeup of its student body, students also play sports such as baseball and softball on campus alongside the events of the Mini Olympics. AIIAS Academy also has its own sports program for its students.

=== Faculty ===
AIIAS Academy has an international faculty; a 2024 institutional presentation listed faculty members from 17 countries: India, the Philippines, the United States, Haiti, Peru, Brazil, Venezuela, Norway, Zimbabwe, Nigeria, South Korea, Malaysia, Indonesia, China, South Africa, Egypt and Chile.

As of 2023, the principal of AIIAS Academy was James C. "Jim" Weller, who holds a PhD in leadership from Andrews University. Before moving to AIIAS in 2019, he served as principal at Adventist schools including Hawaiian Mission Academy and Loma Linda Academy, where he led the junior high school. He was chosen for the post by the AIIAS Academy Board and the institute's administrative committee, and was also appointed a part-time assistant professor in the AIIAS Graduate School.

== Alumni ==
AIIAS publishes a semi-annual Alumni magazine called Flags.

== See also ==
- List of Seventh-day Adventist colleges and universities
