= Joel Toledo =

English fantasy writer

Joel M. Toledo (born 1972) is a poet, fictionist, critic, and journalist based in Quezon City, Metro Manila, Philippines. He has been granted residencies by the Rockefeller Foundation in Bellagio, Italy, and the International Writing Program (IWP) in Iowa, United States.

== Early life and education ==
He grew up in the town of Silang, Cavite. He holds a master's degree in poetry from the University of the Philippines in Diliman, where he also finished two undergraduate degrees (creative writing and journalism).

== Works ==
=== Poetry ===
- The Blue Ones Are Machines, (2017, Vagabond Press, Australia)
- Fault Setting (2016, University of the Philippines Press)
- Ruins and reconstructions (2011, Anvil Publishing)
- The Long Lost Startle (2009, University of the Philippines Press)
- Chiaroscuro (2008, University of Santo Tomas Press)

=== Fiction ===
- Pedro and the Lifeforce (1997, Giraffe Books)

=== Anthologies ===
- Under the Storm: An Anthology of Contemporary Philippine Poetry (Co-editor, 2011, Antithesis Collective)
- Caracoa 2006 (2006, Co-Editor)

== Awards, prizes, and fellowships ==
- 2006 2nd and 3rd Prize Winner, Bridport Prize for Poetry Dorset, UK
- 2011 International Writing Program Fellowship, Iowa, US
- 2011 Rockefeller Foundation Bellagio Center Writing Residency (Poetry), Bellagio, Italy
- 2005-2006 Philippine National Commission for Culture and the Arts (NCCA) Writers Prize Recipient
- First Prize, 2005 Don Carlos Palanca Awards for Poetry in English (What Little I Know of Luminosity)
- Second Prize, 2004 Don Carlos Palanca Awards for Poetry in English (Literature and Other Poems)
- 2006 Meritage Press Award for Poetry
