= JAAS =

JAAS may refer to:

- Journal of Analytical Atomic Spectrometry
- Journal of Asia Adventist Seminary
- Java Authentication and Authorization Service
