= Our Lady of Candelaria Parish Church (Silang) =

Roman Catholic church in Cavite, Philippines

Silang Church
- Diocesan Shrine and Parish of Our Lady of Candelaria; Diyosesanong Dambana at Parokya ng Mahal na Birhen ng Candelaria (Tagalog)
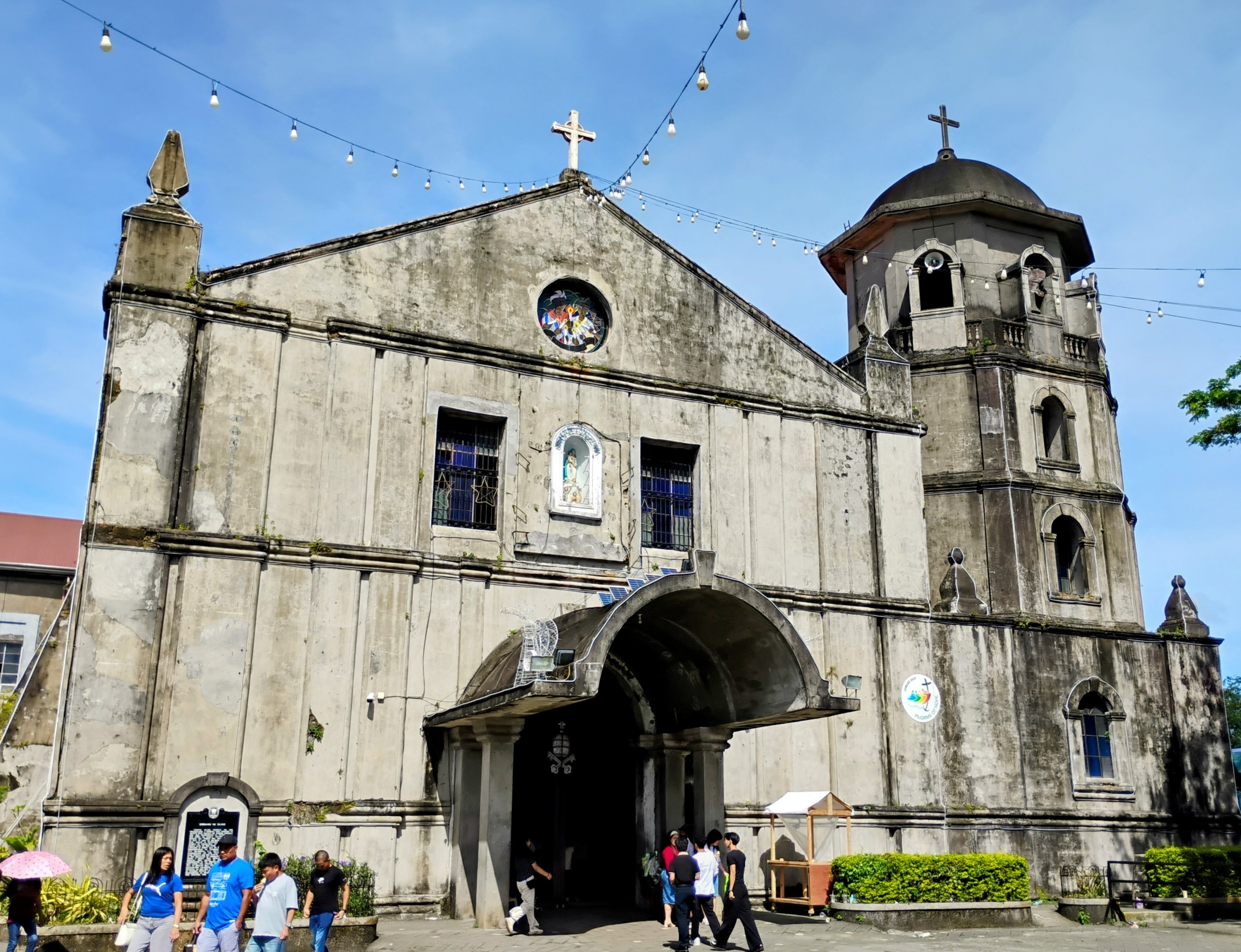
- Church facade in 2025

- Location in Luzon Location in the Philippines
- 14°13′26″N 120°58′28″E
- Location: Silang, Cavite
- Country: Philippines
- Denomination: Roman Catholic

History
- Status: Parish church
- Founded: 1595
- Dedication: Nuestra Señora de Candelaria
- Dedicated: 1640

Architecture
- Functional status: Active
- Architectural type: Church building
- Groundbreaking: 1637
- Completed: 1639

Specifications
- Materials: Adobe stones

Administration
- District: Episcopal District of St. Mark
- Archdiocese: Manila
- Diocese: Imus

Clergy
- Priest(s): Parish Priest: Rev Fr. Luisito Gatdula Parochial Vicar: Rev Fr. Rodolfo D. Arias, Jr.

The Diocesan Shrine and Parish of Our Lady of Candelaria, commonly known as Silang Church, is a Roman Catholic parish church in the municipality of Silang, in the province of Cavite, Philippines under the Diocese of Imus. Dedicated to Our Lady of Candelaria (also "Our Lady of Candles"), it is the oldest existing stone church in the province, having been completed in 1639.

The church is known for its Spanish colonial architectural style and rococo-influenced retablos which were declared a National Cultural Treasure by the National Museum of the Philippines on February 3, 2017.

== Church history ==
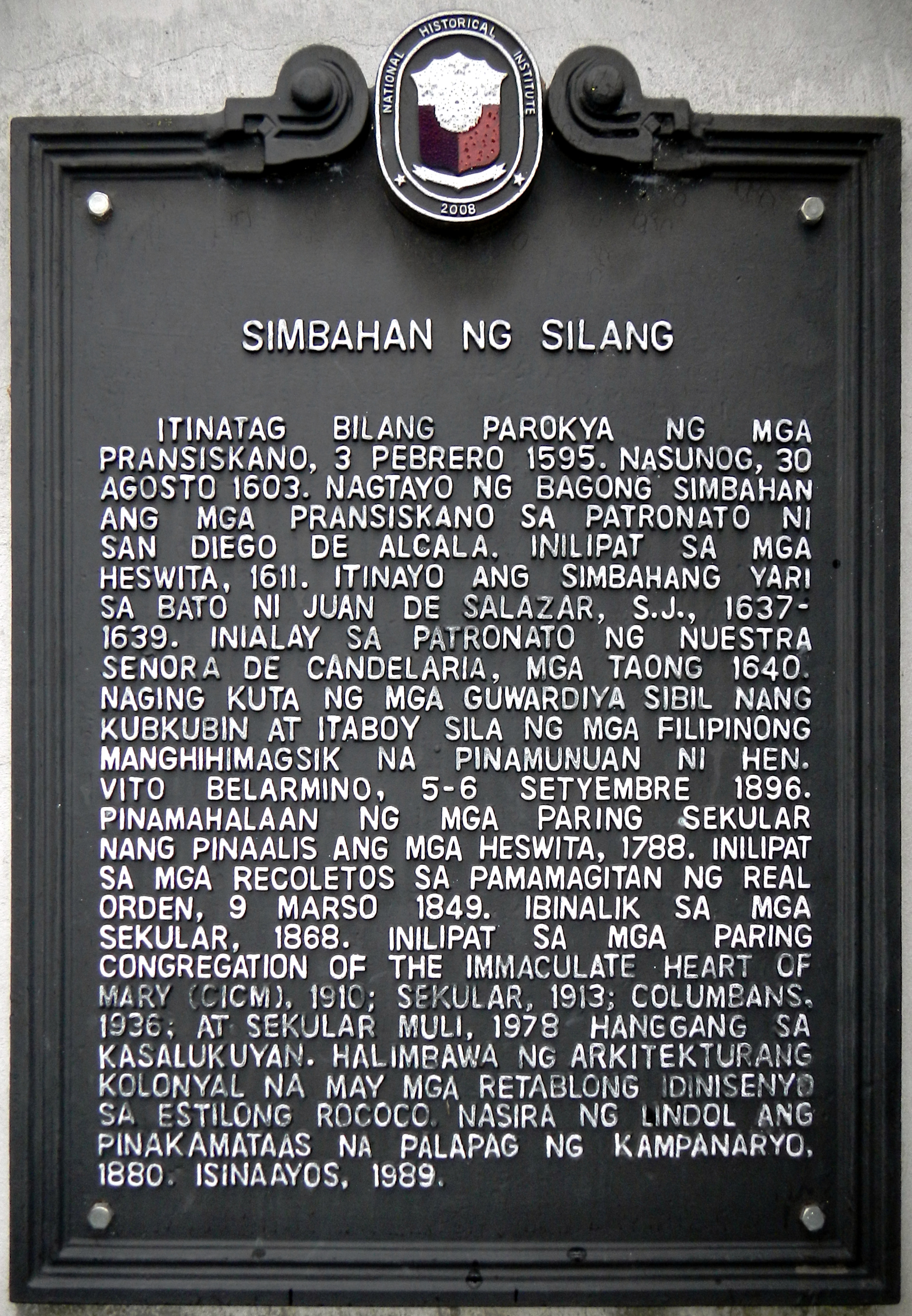
Church NHI historical marker installed in 2008

The Franciscans started evangelizing Silang in 1585 with the permission of Cristóbal de Salvatierra. After ten years, the parish was established on February 3, 1595, and they built a small chapel made of light materials dedicated to Saint Diego of Alcalá alongside a small school. The Franciscans ministered to Silang until 1611 as encomendero (grantee of an encomienda) Capt. Diego Jorge de Villalobos requested the rector of the Society of Jesus in Manila to assign Jesuits to the town in May 1599. The first Jesuits in town was Diego Sánchez and Diego de Santiago. The first two Jesuits were followed by Luis Gómez, Francisco Almerici, Pedro Chirino, and Leonardo Scelsi. The church and school built by the Franciscans was destroyed by fire on August 30, 1603. With a new group of priests to administer, the church and school previously built by the Franciscans were transferred in a new location and made even larger. The stone church was built from 1637 to 1639 under the auspices of Juan de Salazar and was dedicated to Nuestra Señora de Candelaria in 1640. When the Jesuits were expelled from Spanish lands, the parish was taken over by secular clergy in 1788, the Augustinian Recollects in 1849, again by secular clergy in 1868, then the Congregation of the Immaculate Heart of Mary (CICM) in 1910, the seculars for a third time in 1913, and Columbans in 1936. The church has been administered by secular clergy since 1978.

== Features ==
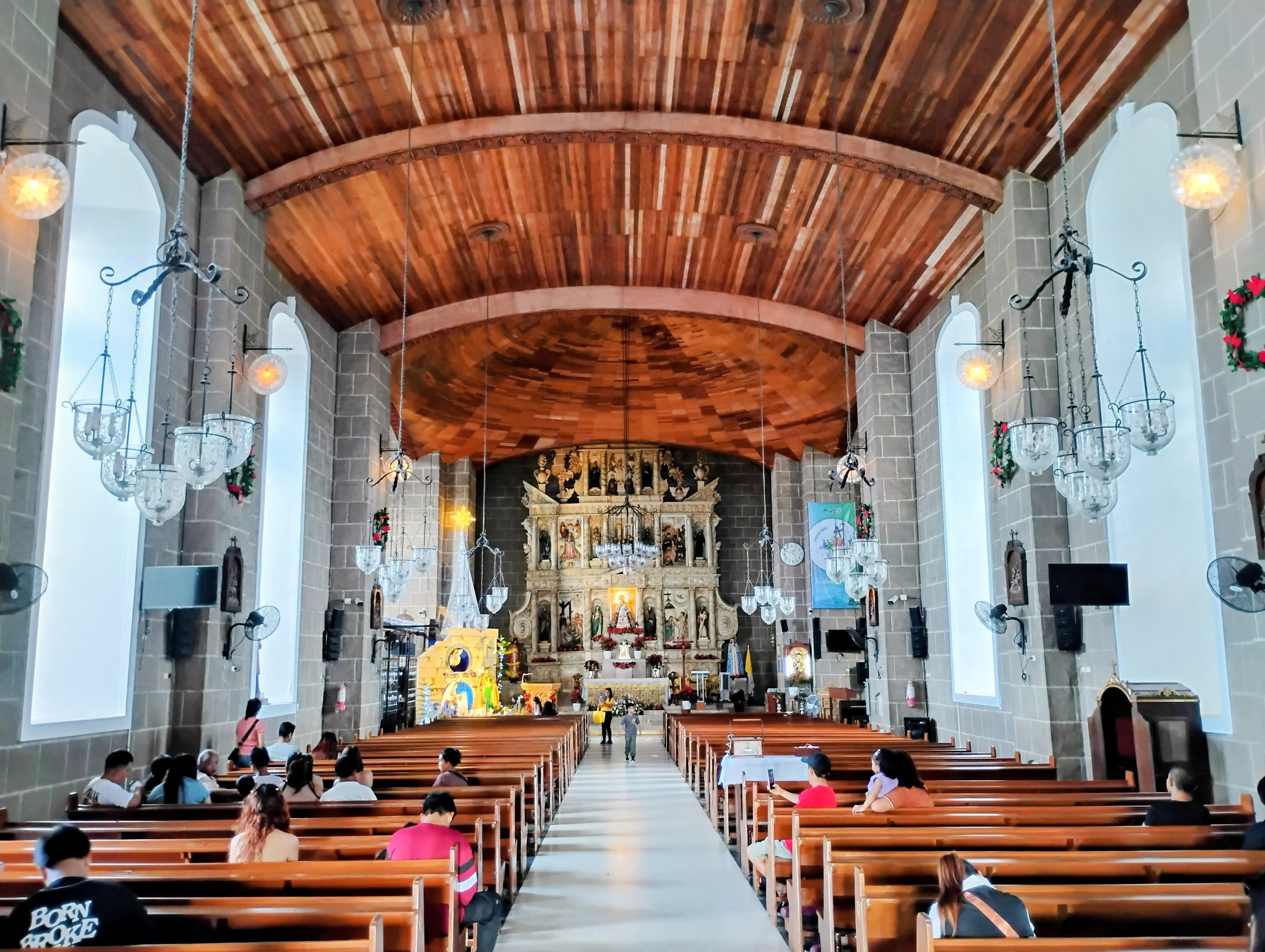
Church interior in 2025

Unlike other Jesuit churches like Antipolo and Tanay built under the auspices of Salazar, Silang church is a typical baroque church without any elaborate and magnificent ornamentation on its simple façade. Huge stone walls were built to protect the church from bandits. Like its exterior, the interior of Silang is also simple. There are no ornamentation on its pilasters and small windows are placed high on walls. It also has a large wooden church entrance. The lack of magnificence on Silang church was due to the death of Salazar in 1645 who primarily administered the church construction.

In 1937, the original wooden floor was replaced by red clay tiles. Due to a fire in 1950, the ceiling was replaced one meter away from the original location.

=== Belfry ===
It has a four-story belfry connected to the main church. The first floor is four sided while the rest of the floors are octagonal – a common and possibly pagoda-inspired feature of belfries in the Philippines. The fourth story of the belfry was destroyed in the 1880 earthquake and was only restored to its original height in 1989.

=== Retablos or altarpieces ===
Altar mayor

Left side altar menor

The retablos of Silang falls under the baroque style and is built from 1643 to 1663. It has three retablo, one retablo mayor or main altar and two side altars or colaterales in each side of the transepts which are mirror images of each other. The side altars have three levels containing relieves except for the central niche of the second story. The first and second level has three niches while the third level has a single niche. Fluted Ionic columns and Corinthian columns designed the first story and the second and third stories respectively. On top of the altars are statues of angels holding shields. One of the side altar is dedicated to women saints, saints in the New Testaments and martyrs. The other one was dedicated to the Jesuit saints. The presence of local styles such as plants, fruits, volutes or circular designs and millipedes made the retablo of Silang distinct.

The altar mayor is the largest and highest altar among the three altars and known relieves depicting the story of Jesus in the life of Mary based on the Mysteries of the Holy Rosary. It has three levels, seven alternating niches for saints and reliefs and same divisions like the side altars. Instead of fluted Corinthian columns separating the retablo sections, garlanded Corinthians and salomónicas are used. The same local styles are also used in the main altar like fruits and flowers including decorative motifs of foliage, angel heads, acanthus crenelations, cartouche, and empty rectangles.

The reliefs on the altar mayor are:

1. Ang Pagbisita (Annunciation of the Virgin Mary)
2. Ang Panunulúyan (Search of Saint Joseph and Virgin Mary for lodging in Bethlehem)
3. Ang mga Mago (The Three Kings)
4. Ang Presentasyon sa Templo (The Presentation of Jesus at the Temple)
5. Ang Koronasyon (The Coronation of the Virgin)

The seventh relief on the topmost level is of the Santo Niño de Ternate. The image of the Nuestra Señora de Candelaria, patroness of Silang, is enshrined in the central niche of the first level of the altar mayor.

=== Restorations ===
During the 1980s up to the early 1990s, the church had a white interior with hints of gold in the columns, niches, pediments, saints and foliage of the retablo which was done during the 1970s restoration by Talleres de Máximo Vicente through application of varnish. Revarnishing was done in 1989 for preservation, while the original pastel color of the retablo was restored in 2002 by carefully removing layers of lacquer, modern varnish, paraffin and soot. In 2004, the golden pillars were restored to beige with a hint of avocado green and its rouge flowers to pink so these complement the modern-day adobe wall-cladding. Ceiling height was also restored to its original location. During the 21st century restoration, a statue of Paul the Apostle holding his sword, located at the right-most portion of the retablo, was stolen. It was never recovered and a replica was enshrined.

== Devotion to the Virgin of Candelaria ==
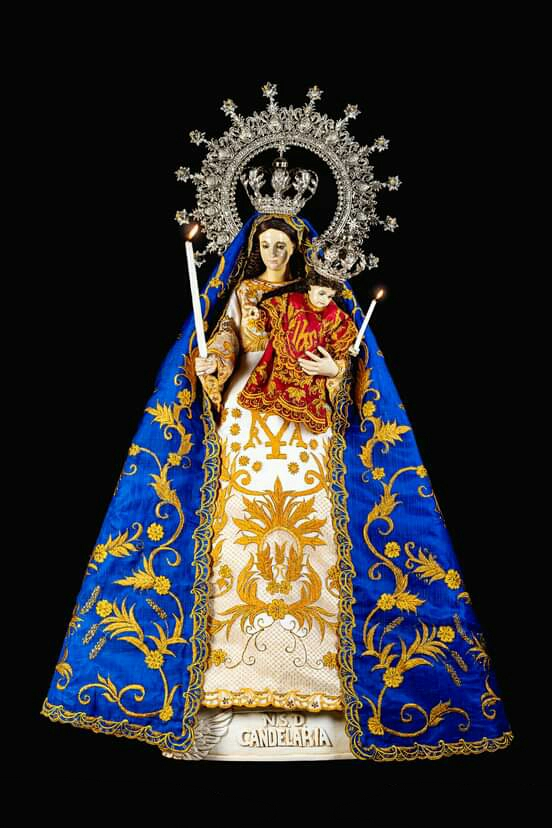
Our Lady of Candelaria of Silang, Patroness of Silang, Cavite

Andres, an indio from Silang discovered a box containing an image of the Blessed Virgin Mary in the mountains of Silang in 1640. Another indio, stunned by the glory of the image requested Andres to give it to him and without hesitation, Andres gave it to the indio. Later on, a tabernacle was built because of the large number of devotees. On January 30, 1643, the indio left the town and forgot about the sacred Friday devotion that he inherited from his ancestors. Upon his return to Silang, the image was not anymore in the tabernacle. He asked for forgiveness, searched for the image and found it. It again disappeared for nine times over the next few years. Upon the advice of the Jesuit rector, he ordered the people to make vigil, bring the image to the church in festive mood. From then on, the image was permanently placed in the retablo of the church of Silang. Until now, the same procession and festive mood is still celebrated in Silang from February 1 to 3 every year that coincides with the feast of the Virgin of Candelaria every February 2.

== Bibliography ==
- Javellana, Rene (1991). Wood & Stone for God's Greater Glory: Jesuit Art & Architecture in the Philippines. Ateneo de Manila University Press. ISBN 9715500552.
- Huerta, Felix (1865). Estado geográfico, topográfico, estadístico, histórico-religioso (in Spanish). Binondo: Imprenta de M. Sanchez y Ca.
- Medina, Philip (September 2013). "Erihiya, Retablo, at mga Banal na Hiyas: Mga Piling Yamang Bayan ng Silang, Cavite na may Kaugnayan sa Pananampalataya sa Panahon ng mga Heswita noong 1599–1768" (PDF). Saliksik e-Journal. 2 (1).
- Moya-Torrecampo, Rosella (2005). "The Tropa's Tropes: An Ear for the Language (Recovering History and Identity from the Vernacular)". Journal of English Studies and Comparative Literature. 8 (1).
- De Borja, Marciano R. (2005). Basques in the Philippines. University of Nevada Press. ISBN 978-0-87417-590-5.
