= Lucsuhin Natural Bridge =

Coordinates: 14.214187°N 120.953969°E

Lucsuhin Natural Bridge, locally called Cabag Cave or Lucsuhin Cave, is a natural bridge located between Lucsuhin and Kalubkob in Silang, Cavite province in the Philippines. The bridge, which crosses the Ylang-Ylang River, is the first large natural bridge reported in the country.

== History ==
The first American to discover and study the bridge is Paul R. Fanning from the Division of Mines during the early part of the American colonial period. He was making a geological reconnaissance in the vicinity of Silang, Cavite in July 1910 when he discovered the natural bridge of unusual size. Owing to its remoteness, Fanning believed no white men have probably visited the place before.

== Geology ==
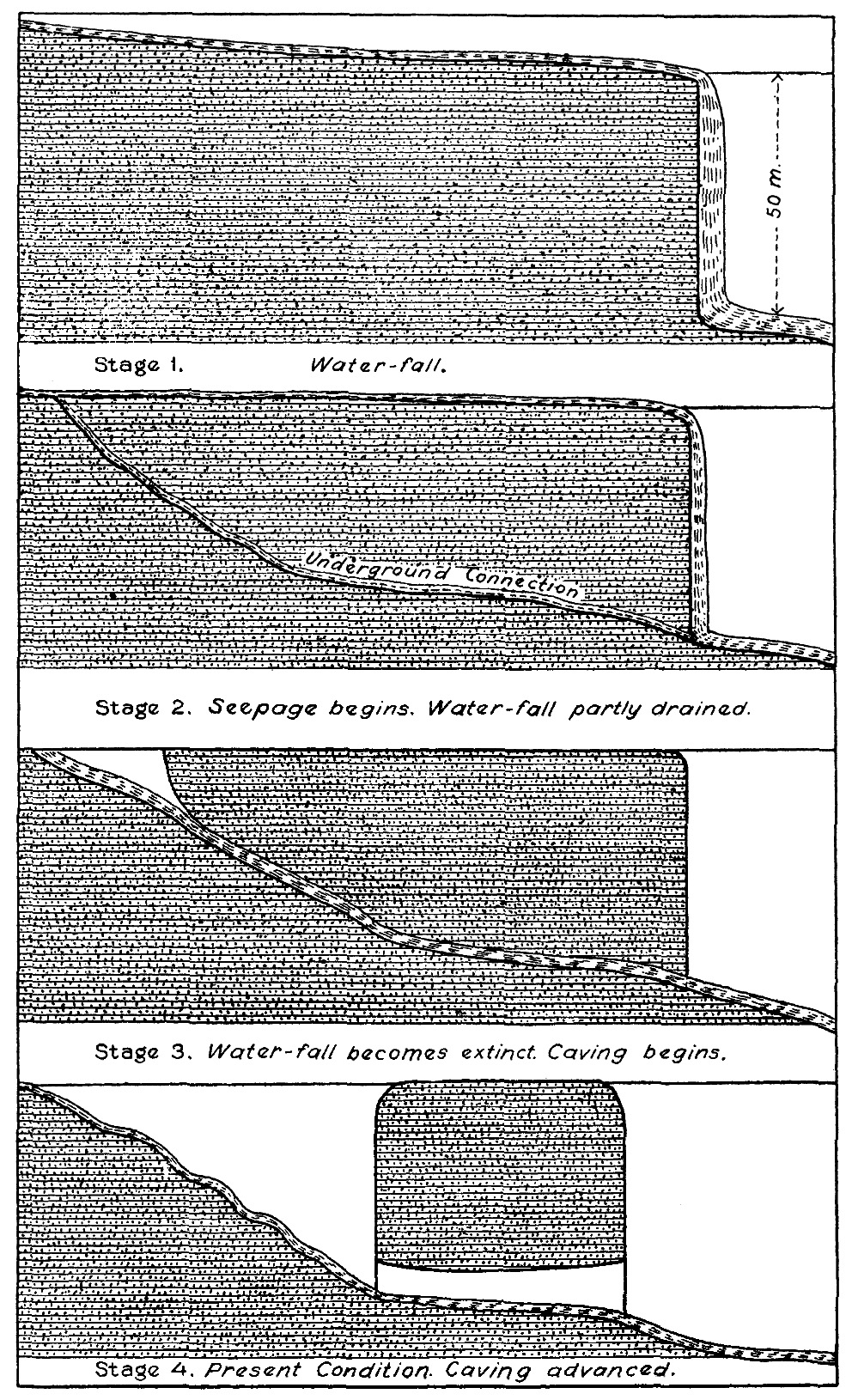
A sketch showing the formation of Lucsuhin Natural Bridge

The natural bridge is located in the great bedded tuff area lying between Manila and Tayabas Bay where the rock is favorable for their formation. The opening under the bridge span is tunnel-like and has a diameter of about 10 metres (33 ft) and a length of about 75 metres (246 ft). It makes a double turn that roughly approximates the shape of the letter 'S.' During low water, the stream occupies a central channel consisting of a staggering series of small falls and potholes which are the result of the action of the water upon the horizontal bedding of the tuff rock.

== Formation of the bridge ==
The floor of the bridge, which is about 40 metres (130 ft) above the stream, was examined by Fanning and showed evidence of once having formed the bed of the stream. Erosion had nearly obliterated this old bed, but had not been sufficient to destroy the sides of the valley. At one time, the river must have flowed at this higher elevation to a place several kilometers down stream from the present tunnel and then passed over a cliff. This cliff gradually receded upstream forming the present box canyon. As illustrated by the sketches, seepage began at a point several hundred meters above the falls and, owing to the horizontal bedding of the rock, it first took a path at right angles to the river course, then descended from bed to bed to the bottom of the falls. The porous, soft nature of the rock favored the rapid enlargement of the underground channel, and eventually the entire stream followed this course.

Subsequent erosion and caving had greatly decreased the length of the underground channel and produced the short canyon above the present entrance portal. Owing to the thinness of the roof, the first part of the tunnel caved rapidly, whereas the erosion and caving of the lower part was much slower. A condition now has been reached where the entrance and exit portals will be eroded with about equal speed and at the same time the tunnel will be greatly enlarged in diameter by down cutting and by caving of the roof. Under these conditions the bridge eventually should assume the arch structure characteristic of famous natural bridges in other parts of the world.

== Protection status ==
The bridge and cave is not a protected area and need preservation for future generations, as well as the areas upriver to preserve the quality of water, lest it would end up like Hinulugang Taktak falls in Rizal province.
