= Michael W. Campbell =

American writer (born 1978)

Michael W. Campbell (born 1978) is a Seventh-day Adventist historian, theologian, pastor, and educator. In 2022 he was appointed director of archives, statistics, and research at the North American Division of Seventh-day Adventists.

== Biography ==
Campbell completed a BA at Southern Adventist University, an MA from Andrews University, and in 2008 a PhD from Andrews University. Campbell was ordained as a Seventh-day Adventist minister in 2008 and spent five years in pastoral ministry in Colorado and Kansas. He is the assistant editor of The Ellen G. White Encyclopedia. In 2007 he was one of the organizers of the 50th anniversary conference at Andrews University on Questions on Doctrine. He formerly served as professor of religion at Southwestern Adventist University and before that as professor of church history at the Adventist International Institute of Advanced Studies. He formerly edited the Journal of Asia Adventist Studies, a peer-reviewed academic journal.

== Research ==
Campbell's doctoral dissertation focused on the 1919 Bible Conference. He argues that it was a germinal event in understanding Seventh-day Adventist theology after the death of Adventist prophetess Ellen G. White. Arthur Patrick states that his research helps "push back the horizons of Adventist understanding."

== Books published ==
- 2024. Oxford Handbook of Seventh-day Adventism (co-editor)
- 2023. We Stand on Their Shoulders
- 2022. 1922: The Rise of Adventist Fundamentalism
- 2020. The Pocket Dictionary for Understanding Adventism
- 2019. 1919: The Untold Story of Adventism's Struggle with Fundamentalism
- 2018. The Ellen G. White Pocket Dictionary (with Jud Lake)
- 2017. Here We Stand: Luther, the Reformation, and Seventh-day Adventism (co-editor)
- 2013. Discovering Ellen G. White
- 2013. Discovering Our Adventist Past

== See also ==
- History of the Seventh-day Adventist Church
- Seventh-day Adventist Church
- Questions on Doctrine
