= Rogationist College =

Roman Catholic college in Cavite, Philippines

Rogationist College - Silang
- Former name: Rogationist Academy (1987–2001)
- Motto: Fides, Sapienta et Virtus (Latin)
- Motto in English: Faith, Wisdom and Virtue
- Type: Private Roman Catholic; Non-profit Coeducational Secondary and Higher education institution
- Established: 1987; 39 years ago
- Founder: Rogationists of the Heart of Jesus
- Religious affiliation: Roman Catholic (Rogationist)
- Academic affiliations: PAASCU
- President: Fr. Carlos Guzman, RCJ
- Rector: Fr. Carlos Guzman, RCJ
- Location: Silang, Cavite, Philippines; 14°08′57″N 120°57′20″E
- Campus: Urban
- Colors: Blue and white
- Nickname: RCian/s
- Website: www.rog.edu.ph
- Location in Luzon Location in the Philippines

Rogationist College - Silang also referred to by its acronym RC is a private Catholic secondary and higher education institution run by the Rogationists of the Heart of Jesus in Silang, Cavite, Philippines. It was founded by the Rogationists in 1987. The Rogationist are a religious institute of the Roman Catholic Church founded by St. Hannibal Mary di Francia The students are usually called RCian/s. Rogationist College offers Junior High School, Senior High School, College and Technical Courses. It is located at Silang, Cavite.

== History ==
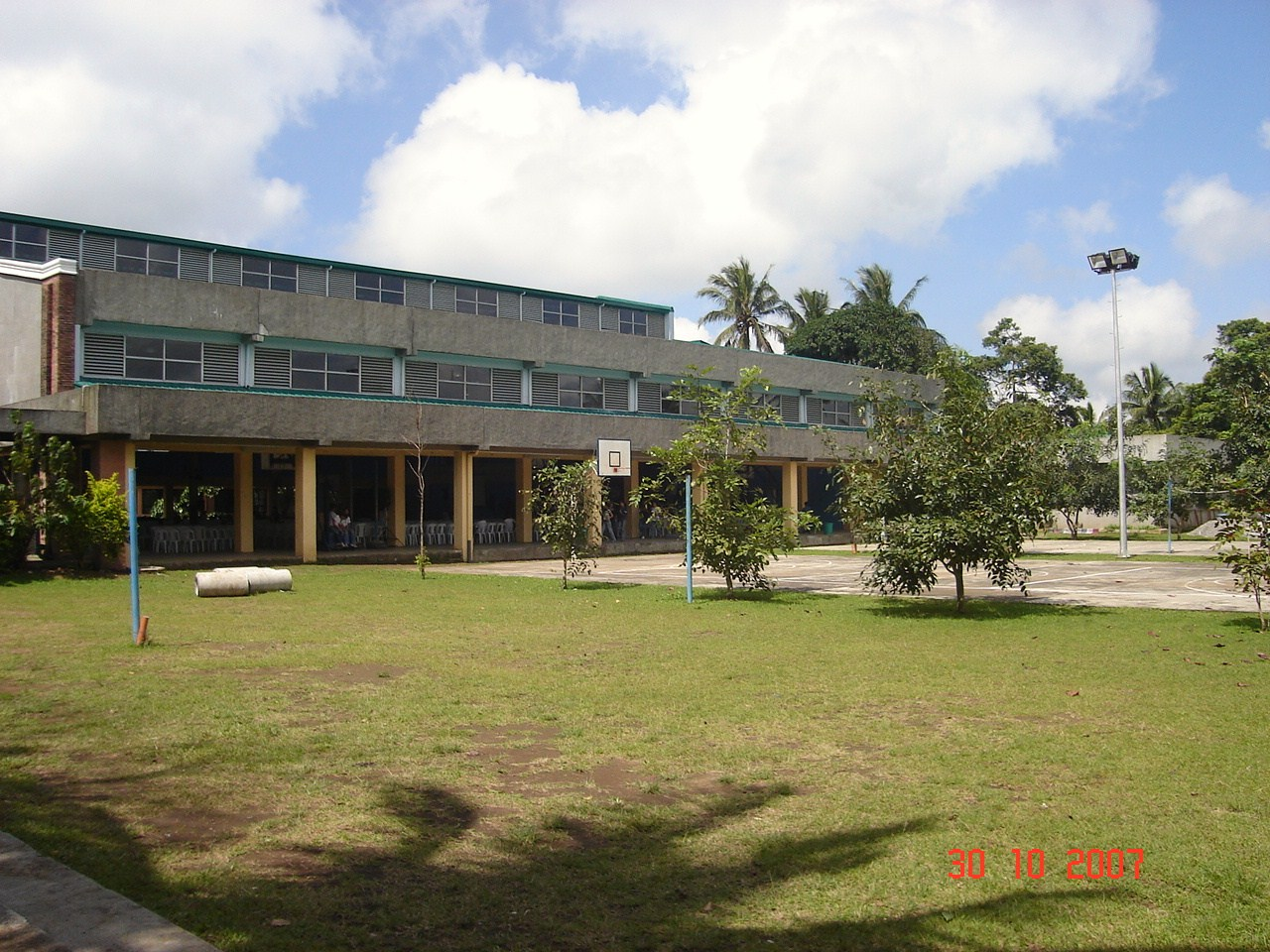
Gymnasium of the Rogationist College of Silang, Cavite, Philippines

=== Saint Anthony's Boys Village ===
The Saint Anthony's Boys Village (SABV) in Cavite is the first “Anthonian Boys Village” of the Rogationists Fathers in the Philippines. This religious charitable institution serves as home to indigent boys who desire to pursue quality education. The village complex was established by Italian Rogationists priests with the help of the Italian government through Giuseppe Tiovini Foundation. Rogationist College and Saint Anthony's Boys Village features the teachings of Saint Hannibal Mary di Francia and Saint Anthony of Padua.
