= Estrella Hospital =

Private hospital in Cavite, Philippines

Geography
- Location: Silang, Cavite, Philippines
- Coordinates: 14°13′29″N 120°58′07″E

Organization
- Type: for profit hospital
- Affiliated university: None

Services
- Beds: 25

Estrella Hospital is a small, older Philippines hospital located at Km. 43 Aguinaldo Highway, Silang, Cavite. It has 25 in-patient beds. Estrella Hospital, privately owned, is listed by the Philippine Department of Health as a level 2 hospital.
