= Ayala Westgrove Heights =

Residential development in Silang, Cavite, Philippines

Coordinates: 14.23631°N 121.03298°E

Ayala Westgrove Heights is a residential development by Ayala Land located in Silang, Cavite, Philippines. Located adjacent to Santa Rosa, Laguna, it is approximately 3 kilometers (1.9 mi) from the Santa Rosa–Tagaytay Road. The gross land area is approximately 400 hectares (990 acres), with an estimated density of 10 lots per hectare.

Ayala Westgrove Heights was founded by Ayala Land in 1998.

Currently, there are two entrances to Ayala Westgrove Heights, via the South Entrance that can be accessed directly from Santa Rosa via South Boulevard and via Acacia Gate near the Laguna Technopark Annex in Biñan, Laguna.

== Gallery ==
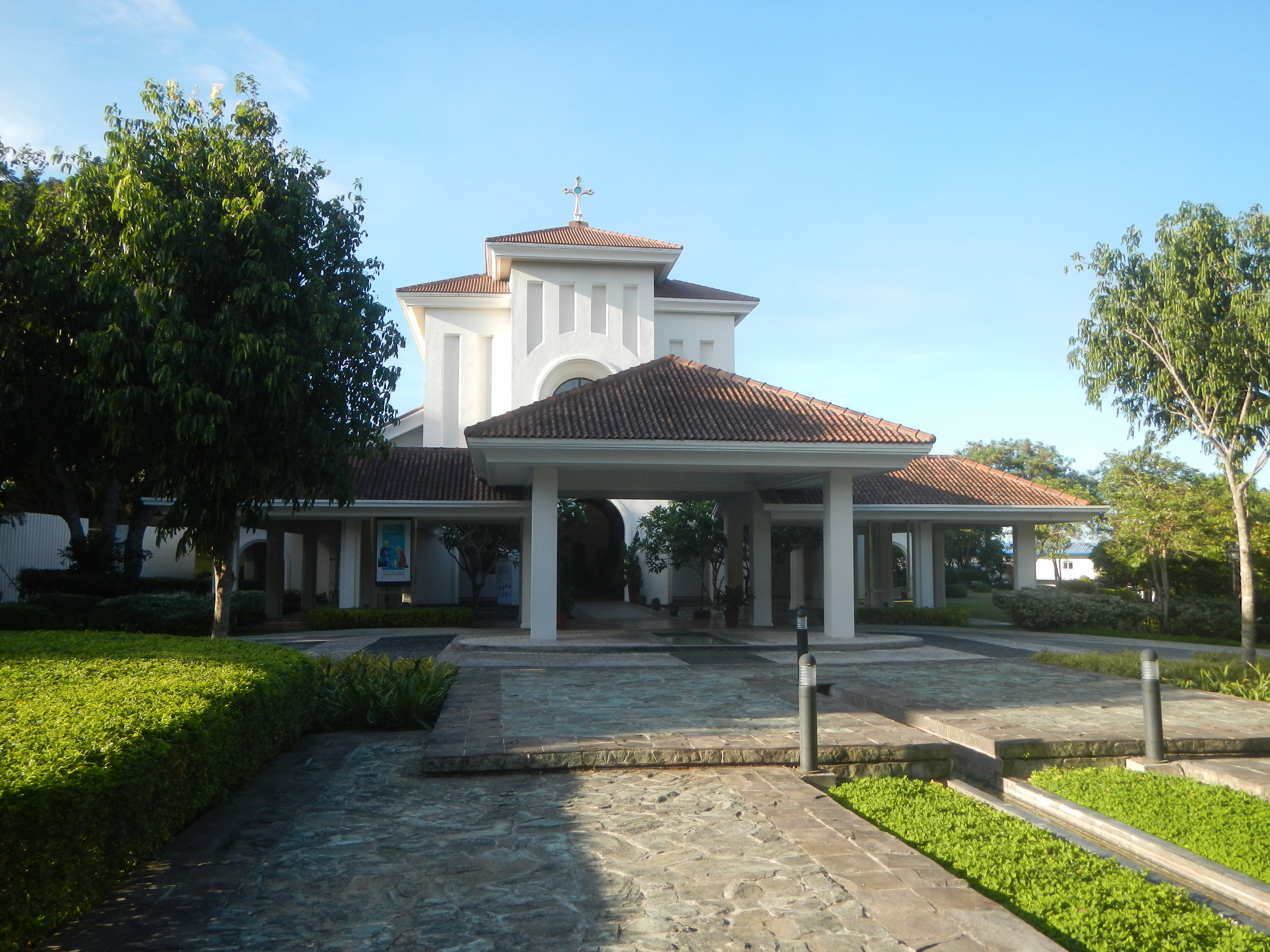
St. Benedict Parish, Westgrove

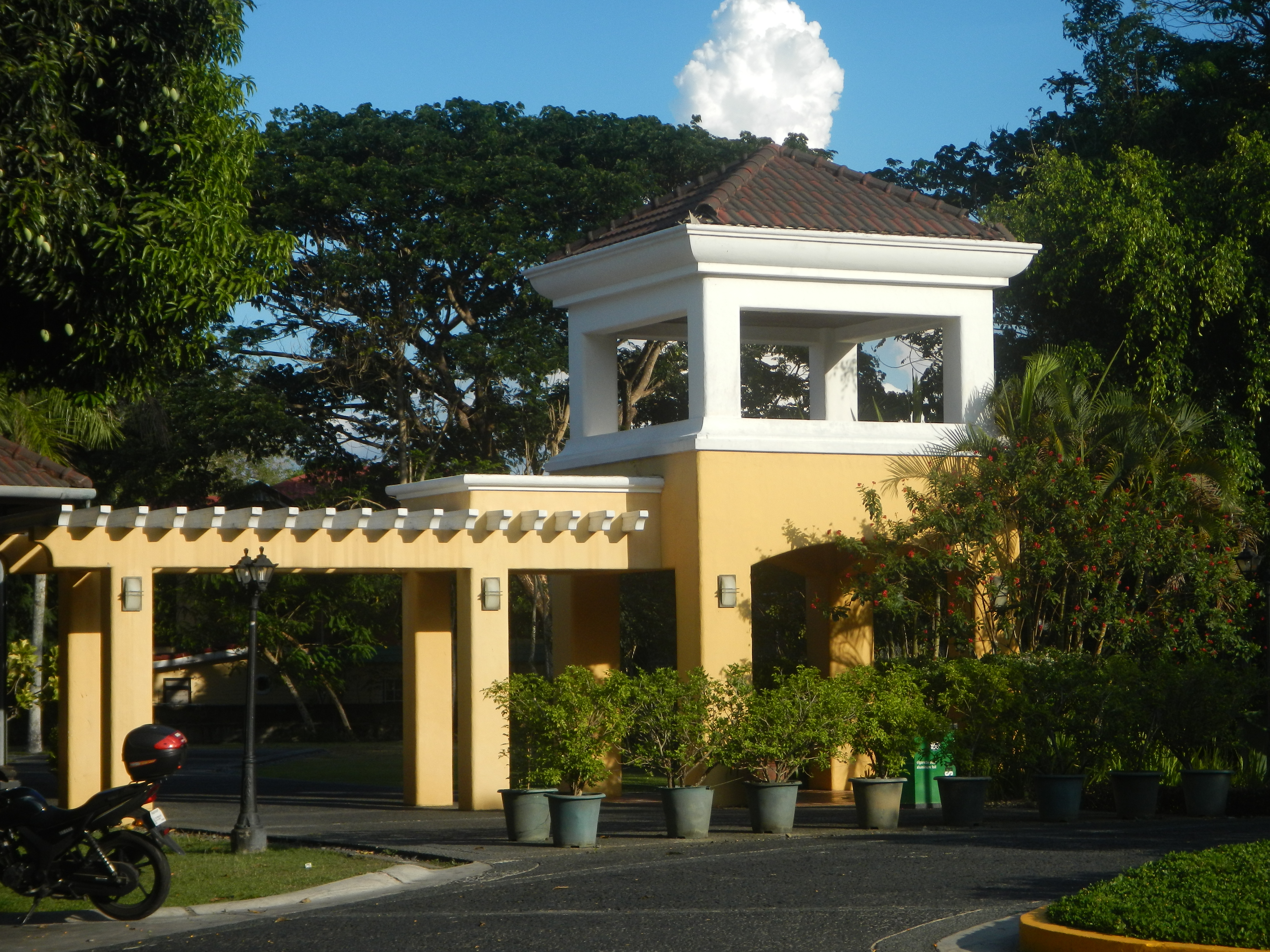
Westgrove Plaza
