= Master of Science in Administration =

Professional post-graduate degree

A Master of Science in Administration or Master of Science in Accounting degree (abbreviated MScA or MSA) is a type of Master of Science degree awarded by universities, primarily in the United States. The field of study came into existence in the mid-to-late 1970s. The focus of the MSA program is management skills and the program is designed to develop and train management graduates who may serve in administrative positions in the private or public sector.

The MSA program is a branch of the Master of Public Administration (MPA) and Master of Business Administration (MBA). The MSA combines courses from several fields, including psychology, economics, political science, statistics, computer science, business administration, technology and resource management. The MSA has similarities to the MPA, as it focuses on organizational behavior, microeconomics, public finance, research methods, policy process and policy analysis, ethics, management, and performance measurement. The similarities with the MBA include the focus on economics, organizational behavior, marketing, accounting, operations management, international business, information technology management, supply chain management, and government policy.

Universities that currently offer this degree include Arizona State University; Boston University; Central Michigan University; Pepperdine University; University of West Florida; Université Laval, Québec, Canada; and HEC Montréal.
