= Adventist University of the Philippines =

Christian university in Cavite, Philippines

- Pamantasang Adbentista ng Pilipinas (Filipino)
- Seal
- Former names: Philippine Seventh-day Adventist Academy (1917–1927); Philippine Junior College (1927–1932); Philippine Union College (1932–1996)
- Motto: On Ever Onward
- Type: Private Christian higher education institution
- Established: 1917; 109 years ago
- Founder: Seventh-day Adventist Church missionaries
- Religious affiliation: Protestant (Seventh-day Adventist)
- President: Arceli H. Rosario
- Location: Brgy. Puting Kahoy Silang, Cavite, Philippines; 14°13′01.92″N 121°02′28.68″E
- Campus: Urban 165 hectares (1,650,000 m^{2})
- Hymn: "Shine on Forever"
- Colors: Blue and Gold
- Mascot: Penguin (Ace)
- Website: www.aup.edu.ph
- Location in Luzon Location in the Philippines

The Adventist University of the Philippines is a private Protestant coeducational higher education institution located in Silang, Cavite, Philippines. The university is affiliated with the Seventh-day Adventist Church. It holds an autonomous status granted by the Commission on Higher Education.

It is part of the Seventh-day Adventist education system, the world's second largest Christian school system.

== History ==
The Adventist University of the Philippines was established by Seventh-day Adventist Church missionaries. In 1915, A. G. Daniels visited the Philippines and laid plans for the organization of an academic institution. Daniels was followed by L. V. Finster who reported that in 1916, I. A. Steinel and O. F. Sevrens and their families had arrived to supervise the establishment of the Philippine Seventh-day Adventist Academy on a five-acre land located along Calle Luna in Pasay, then part of the province of Rizal. The school formally opened on June 12, 1917, with 24 boys and 12 girls. The sole school building had classrooms on the first floor and a dormitory for the boys on the second floor. The girls stayed in an old mixed-material house which already existed on the land.

In 1925, at the Spring Council of the Far Eastern Division, it was voted that the academy be authorized to carry fourteen grades, adding one grade each year toward 1927, and that the name be changed to Philippine Junior College. Elder W. B. Amundsen was elected principal in 1927 until 1931.

At the end of 1927, 26 hectares of land was purchased in Baesa, Caloocan, then part of the province of Rizal, to accommodate the increasing student population. Prof. L. M. Stump, president of the college in 1931 directed the construction of the school buildings. In 1932, the school moved to the Baesa Campus. In that same year, FED permitted the junior college's elevation to a senior one, naming it the Philippine Union College (PUC). The school song, "Shine on Forever", was composed in 1933.

The growing enrollment inspired the administration to purchase a bigger property comprising 165 hectares of land located at Putting Kahoy, Silang, in the province of Cavite, in 1972. The year 1979 saw the first batch of freshmen and sophomore students at this new campus and in 1981, with the movement of the juniors and seniors from Baesa, the campus transfer was completed.

On August 1, 1996, in accordance with Republic Act No. 7722 and by virtue of Resolution No. 132-96, Series of 1996, the Commission on Higher Education granted PUC university status, entailing the change of the school's name from Philippine Union College to Adventist University of the Philippines (AUP).

The university acquired deregulated status on October 22, 2001, and was awarded autonomous status on October 27, 2003.

Arts and Sciences, Business, Education and Nursing Programs are accredited Level IV; Accountancy, Master in Business Administration and Master of Arts in Education Programs are accredited Level IV; PhD Education is accredited Level 3 by the Association of Christian Schools, Colleges and Universities Accrediting Agency, Inc. (ACSCU-AAI).

AUP is accredited as a Level IV institution by the United States–based Accrediting Association of Seventh-day Adventist Schools, Colleges and Universities.

On June 1, 2022, Dr. Arceli H. Rosario officially took office as the eighteenth and first woman president of the university. Her investiture ceremony took place on June 27, 2022.

== Academic divisions ==
The university consists of nine colleges:

- College of Arts and Humanities
- College of Business
- College of Dentistry
- College of Health
- College of Medicine
- College of Nursing
- College of Science and Technology
- College of Teacher Education
- College of Theology

The campus is also home to the university's two basic education schools.

- AUP Academy (Junior High-School and Senior High-School)
- AUP Elementary

== See also ==
- List of Seventh-day Adventist colleges and universities
- Seventh-day Adventist education
