= Silang, Cavite =

Municipality in Cavite, Philippines

Silang
- Municipality
- Municipality of Silang
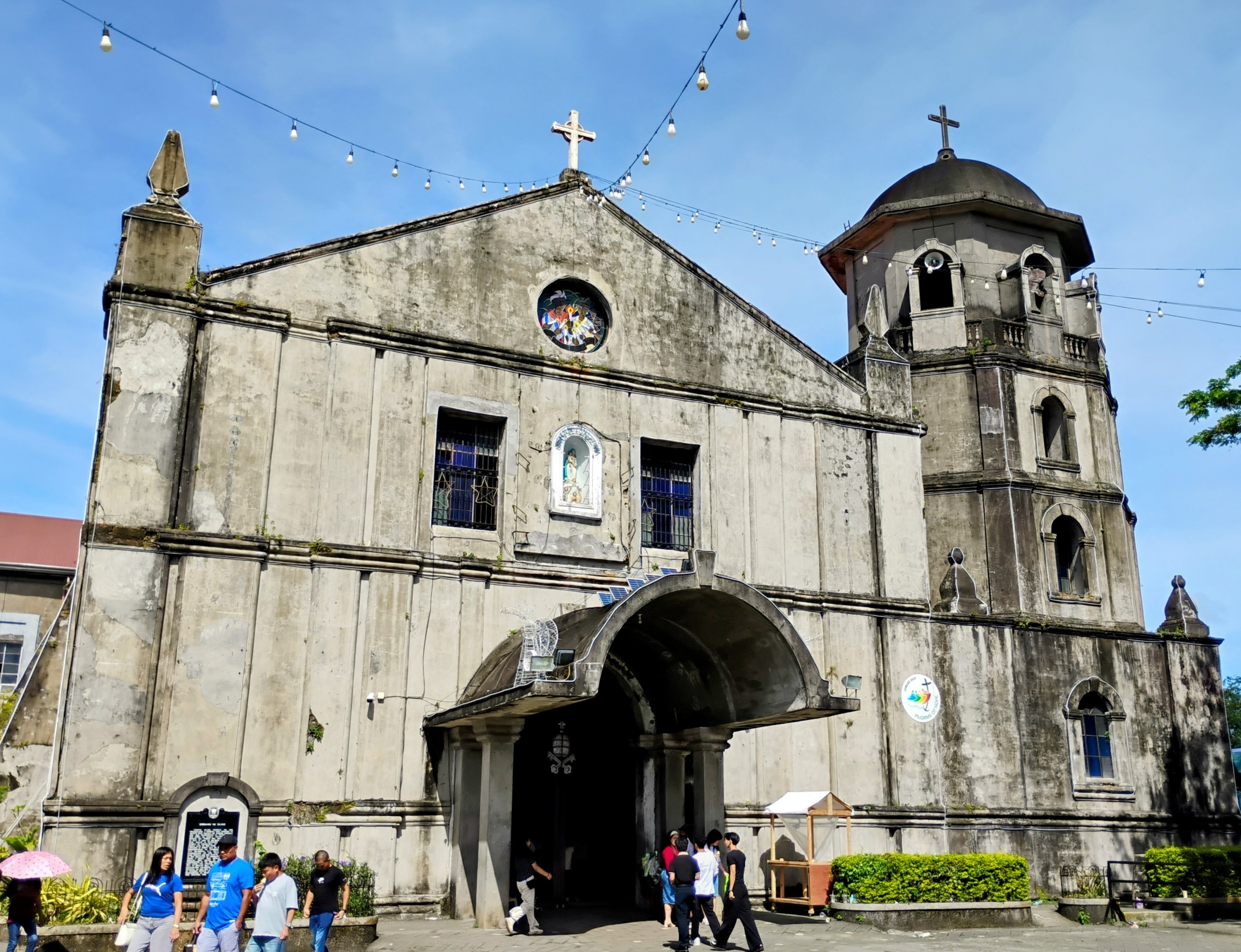
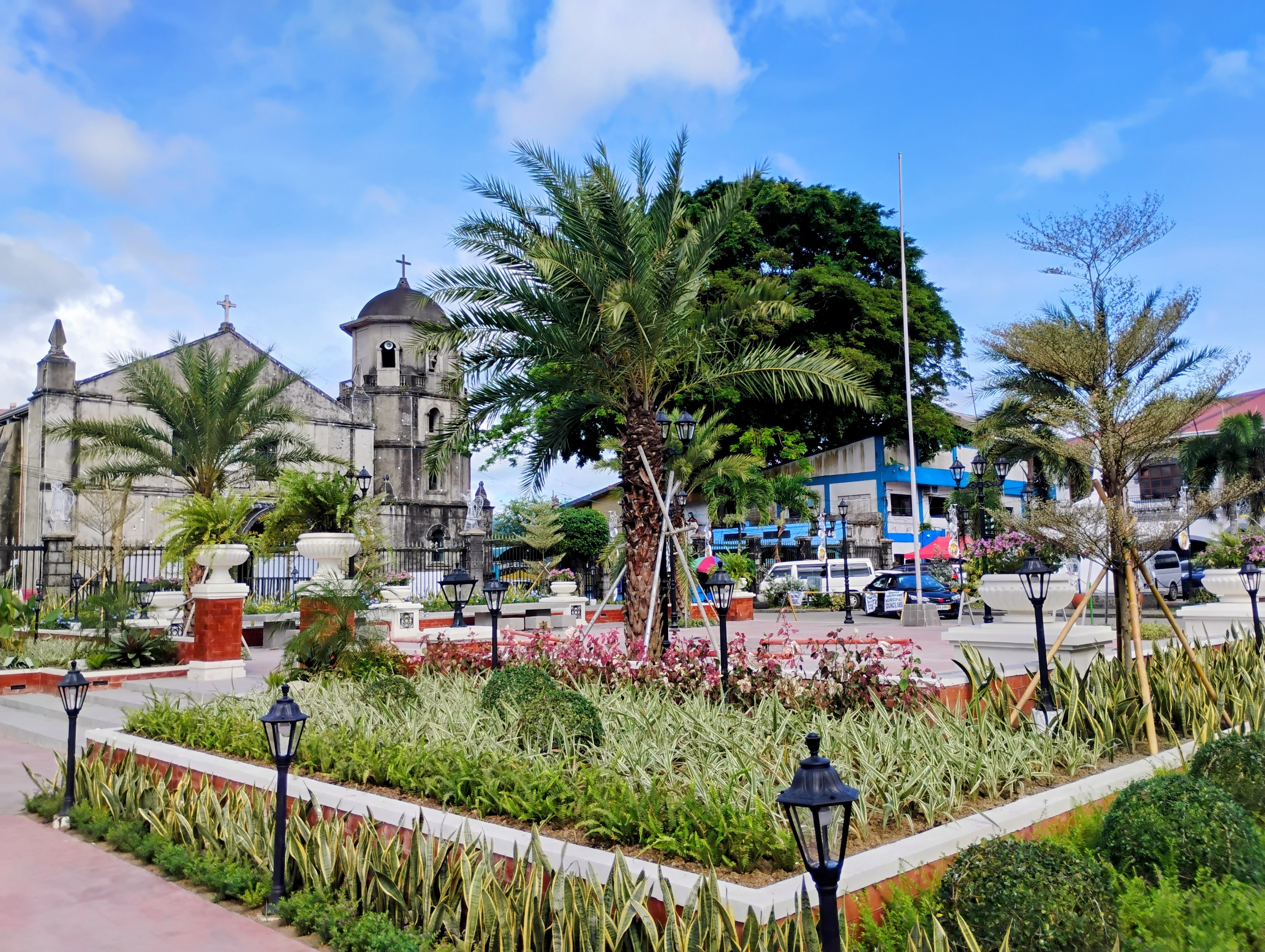
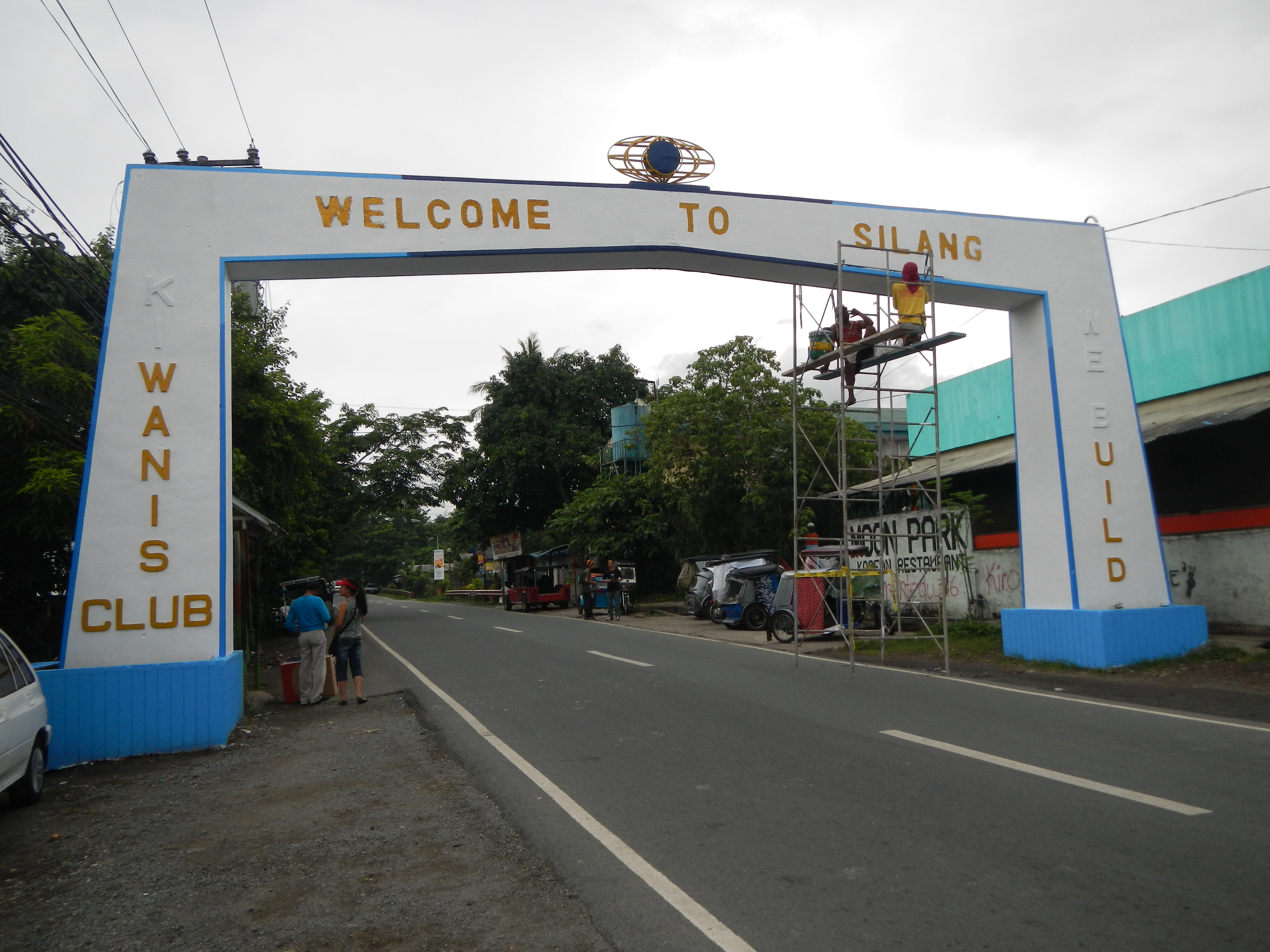
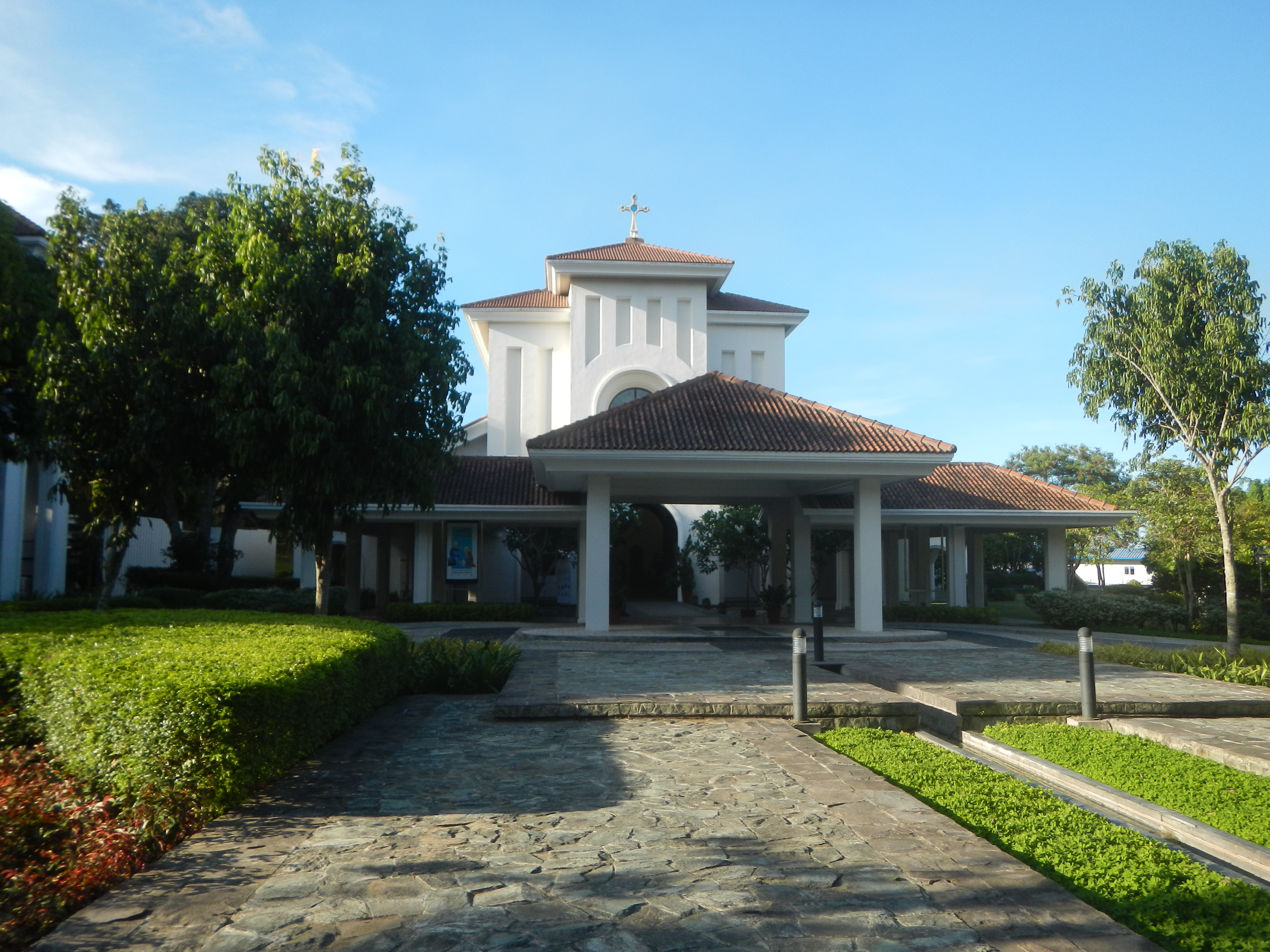
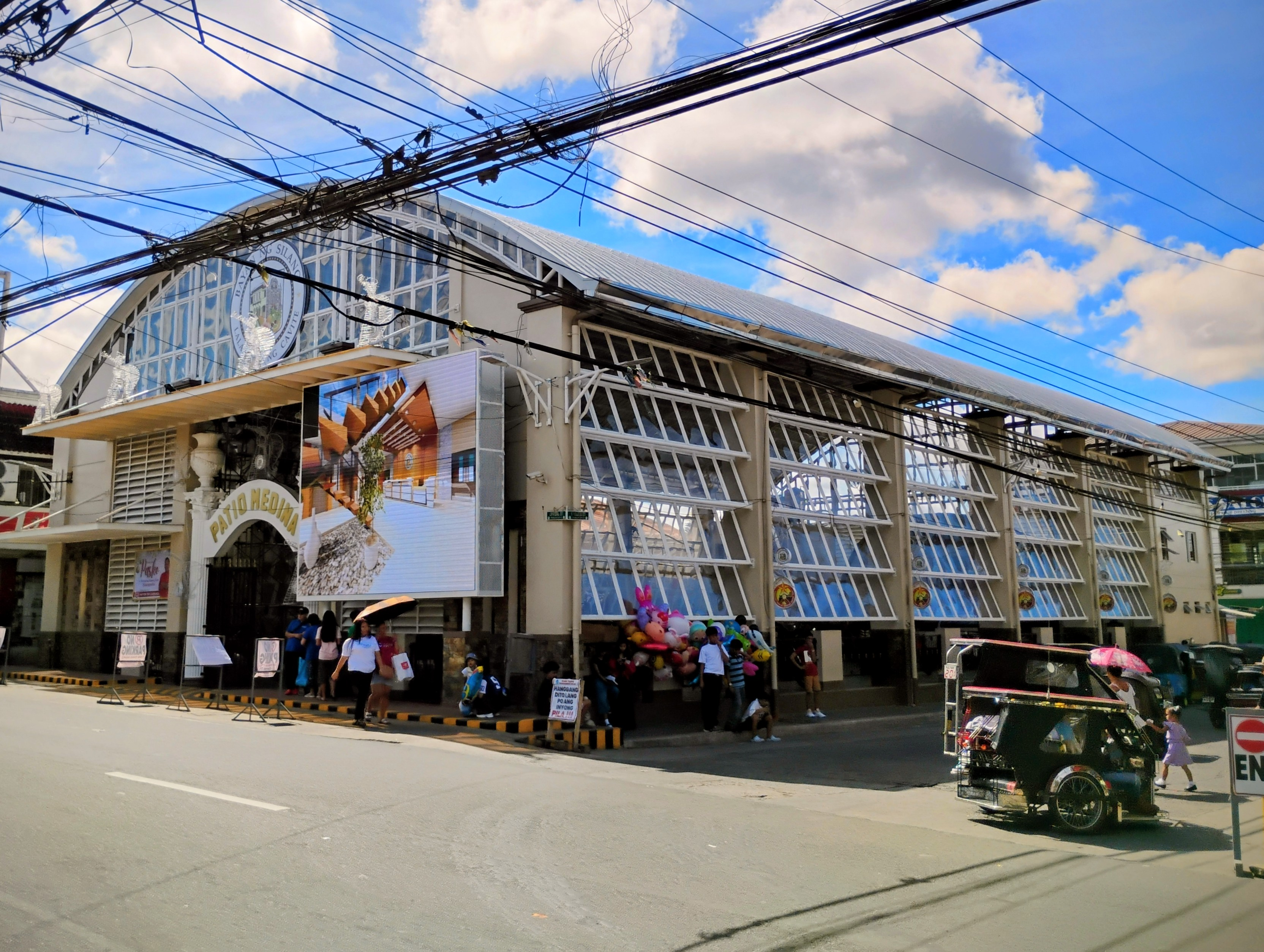
- (From left, clockwise): Silang Church, Silang Town Plaza, Acienda Designer Outlet, Patio Medina, St. Benedict Parish–Westgrove, Welcome Arch

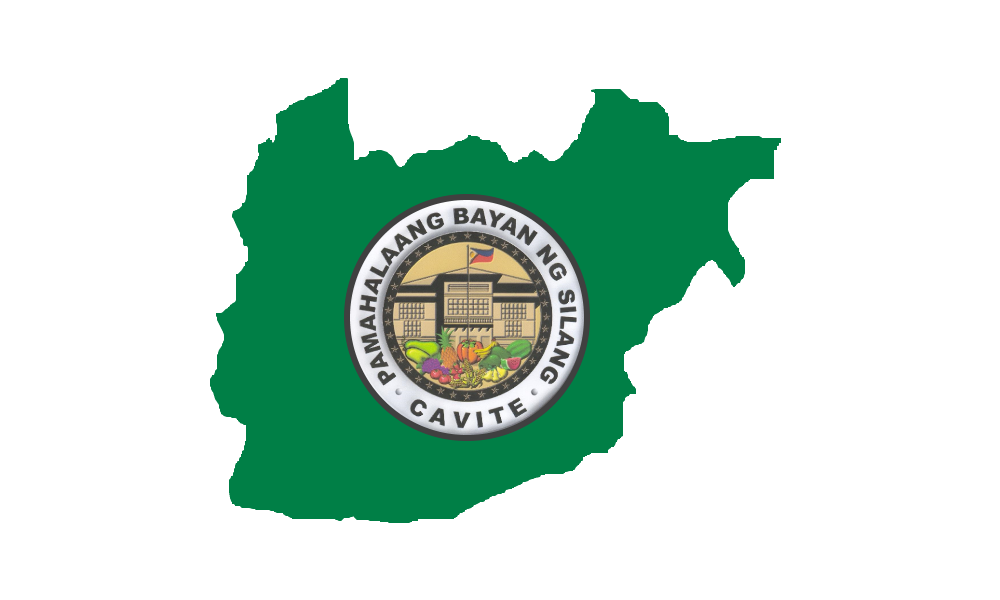
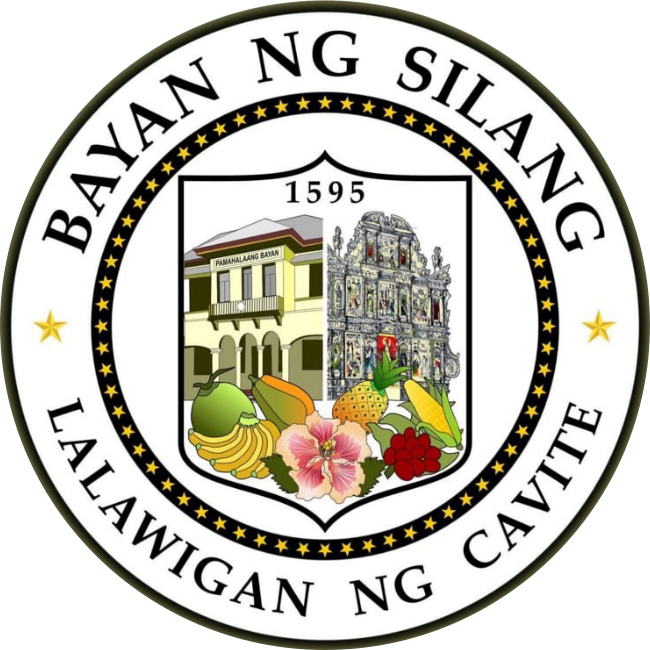
- Flag Seal
- Nicknames: Food Bastion for Metro Manila; Gateway to Tagaytay
- Map of Cavite with Silang highlighted
- Interactive map of Silang
- Location within the Philippines
- Coordinates: 14°13′50″N 120°58′30″E
- Country: Philippines
- Region: Calabarzon
- Province: Cavite
- District: 5th district
- Founded: February 3, 1595
- Barangays: 64 (see Barangays)

Government
  - Type: Sangguniang Bayan
  - Mayor: Edward E. Carranza
  - Vice Mayor: Crispin G. Reyes
  - Representative: Roy M. Loyola
  - Municipal Council: Members: Ivee Jayne Reyes; Ivan Chester Amutan; Aristides Jose Virgilio Velazco; Perpetuo Desingaño; Luis Batingal Jr.; Juan Carlo Madlansacay; Eric Garcia
  - Electorate: 158,777 voters (2025)

Area
  - Total: 209.43 km^{2} (80.86 sq mi)
- Elevation: 305 m (1,001 ft)
- Highest elevation: 432 m (1,417 ft)
- Lowest elevation: 187 m (614 ft)

Population (2024 census)
  - Total: 313,145
  - Density: 1,495.2/km^{2} (3,872.6/sq mi)
  - Households: 71,463

Economy
  - Income class: 1st municipal income class
  - Poverty incidence: 10.46% (2023)
  - Revenue: ₱ 1,597 million (2024)
  - Assets: ₱ 4,778 million (2024)
  - Expenditure: ₱ 681.4 million (2024)
  - Liabilities: ₱ 1,292 million (2024)

Service provider
  - Electricity: Manila Electric Company (Meralco)
  - Water: Silang Water District
- Time zone: UTC+8 (PST)
- ZIP code: 4118
- PSGC: 0402118000
- IDD : area code: +63 (0)46
- Native languages: Tagalog
- Major religions: Roman Catholicism; Aglipayan Church; Protestantism; Islam
- Feast date: February 2
- Ecclesiastical dioceses: Diocese of Imus (Roman Catholic); Diocese of Cavite (Aglipayan Church)
- Patron saint: Our Lady of Candelaria
- Website: www.silang.gov.ph

Silang (Tagalog: [ˈsi.lɐŋ]), officially the Municipality of Silang (Filipino: Bayan ng Silang), is a municipality in the province of Cavite, Philippines. According to the 2024 census, it has a population of 313,145 people. Its land area is 209.43 km^{2} (80.86 sq mi), making it the largest municipality in Cavite.

It is known for its scenic landscapes and rich cultural heritage. Also renowned for its agricultural produce particularly sweet mangoes, which are regarded as some of the best in the country.

== Etymology ==
The name of Silang (originally called Silan) originates from Tagalog silang, meaning "mountain pass".

== History ==
=== Precolonial period ===
The traditional origins of the town are attributed to ten Bornean datus who sailed northward on board balangays and ended in Silang through Taal Lake. Its first settlers were Gat Hingiw, his wife Gat Kaliwanag, and their seven children, who later moved to different parts of the town and established their respective barangays. Gat Pandan stayed in the original community and developed the area.

=== Spanish colonial era ===
At the onset of Spanish colonization in the Philippines, the King of Spain granted tracts of land to conquistadores and their descendants, who in turn collected tributes from the inhabitants. Silang was originally part of the encomienda (land grant) of Diego Jorge de Villalobos, whose jurisdiction included the present-day towns of Carmona, Amadeo, Indang, Alfonso, General Trias, and Tanza. On February 3, 1595, the parish of Silang was formally established, marking the official creation of the town.

For many years, Silang was one of the biggest towns, by the 20th century its land area was reduced to its current size, as some of its former villages later became independent towns. Indang was the first to be granted town status in 1655. By the 19th century, the town lost land to the towns of Carmona and Amadeo, and by 1938, the town's southern lands were ceded to become part of the city of Tagaytay.

The Silang encomienda was later purchased from King Ferdinand VI of Spain for 2,000 pesetas on March 9, 1746, to prevent it from becoming a "friar land" like the other towns of Cavite, executed through the representation of Bernabe Javier Manahan and Gervacio dela Cruz. The 1818 Spanish census showed the area had 2,255 native families and 6 Spanish-Filipino families and once included Tagaytay.

=== Contemporary history ===
On January 22, 2023, the municipality was certified by Guinness World Records as volunteers from the municipal government and the Catholic parish church successfully lit 621 candles in a world record attempt for longest line of candles lit in relay, surpassing 366 set in India in 2016. The attempt was held to commemorate the feast of Nuestra Señora de Candelaria.

== Geography ==
The municipality of Silang is 23 kilometers (14 mi) from Imus and 43 kilometers (27 mi) south of Manila. It is bounded by General Trias, Dasmariñas, General Mariano Alvarez, and Carmona to the north, Biñan, Santa Rosa, Cabuyao to the east, Tagaytay to the south, and Amadeo to the west.

Silang is located in the eastern section of Cavite. It is home to the Philippine National Police Academy, PDEA Academy, and International Institute of Rural Reconstruction head office, the Adventist University of the Philippines, and the Philippine Publishing House Headquarters.

With the continuous expansion of Metro Manila, the municipality is now part of the Manila's conurbation which spans southward toward Lipa, Batangas.

=== Barangays ===
Silang is politically subdivided into 64 barangays, as indicated below.

- Acacia
- Adlas
- Anahaw I
- Anahaw II
- Balite I
- Balite II
- Balubad
- Banaba
- Batas
- Biga I
- Biga II
- Biluso
- Bucal
- Buho
- Bulihan
- Cabangaan
- Carmen
- Hoyo
- Hukay
- Iba
- Inchican
- Ipil I
- Ipil II
- Kalubkob
- Kaong
- Lalaan I
- Lalaan II
- Litlit
- Lucsuhin
- Lumil
- Maguyam
- Malabag
- Mataas na Burol
- Malaking Tatiao
- Munting Ilog
- Narra I
- Narra II
- Narra III
- Paligawan
- Pasong Langka
- Poblacion I
- Poblacion II
- Poblacion III
- Poblacion IV
- Poblacion V
- Pooc I
- Pooc II
- Pulong Bunga
- Pulong Saging
- Puting Kahoy
- Sabutan
- San Miguel I
- San Miguel II
- San Vicente I
- San Vicente II
- Santol
- Tartaria
- Tibig
- Toledo
- Tubuan I
- Tubuan II
- Tubuan III
- Ulat
- Yakal

=== Climate ===
Silang has a tropical savanna climate (Aw in the Köppen climate classification) with a pronounced dry season from November to April. Its nearness to Tagaytay is the reason for its near-winter like cold temperatures during the early dry season, especially in the villages straddling the Tagaytay border and the town proper.

Climate data for Silang, Cavite
Month	Jan	Feb	Mar	Apr	May	Jun	Jul	Aug	Sep	Oct	Nov	Dec	Year
Mean daily maximum °C (°F)	27 (81)	28 (82)	30 (86)	32 (90)	30 (86)	29 (84)	27 (81)	27 (81)	27 (81)	28 (82)	28 (82)	27 (81)	28 (83)
Mean daily minimum °C (°F)	18 (64)	18 (64)	19 (66)	20 (68)	22 (72)	22 (72)	22 (72)	22 (72)	22 (72)	21 (70)	20 (68)	19 (66)	20 (69)
Average precipitation mm (inches)	51 (2.0)	40 (1.6)	52 (2.0)	70 (2.8)	271 (10.7)	355 (14.0)	508 (20.0)	417 (16.4)	436 (17.2)	255 (10.0)	120 (4.7)	133 (5.2)	2,708 (106.6)
Average rainy days	5.2	4.5	6.4	9.2	19.7	24.3	26.9	25.7	24.4	21.0	12.9	9.1	189.3
Source: Meteoblue

== Demographics ==
Population census of Silang

Year	Pop.	±% p.a.
1903	5,671	—
1918	9,256	+3.32%
1939	18,909	+3.46%
1948	20,292	+0.79%
1960	28,631	+2.91%
1970	38,999	+3.13%

Year	Pop.	±% p.a.
1975	44,809	+2.82%
1980	52,321	+3.15%
1990	93,790	+6.01%
1995	124,062	+5.38%
2000	156,137	+5.05%
2007	199,825	+3.46%

Year	Pop.	±% p.a.
2010	213,490	+2.44%
2015	248,085	+2.90%
2020	295,644	+3.76%
2024	313,145	+1.39%

Source: Philippine Statistics Authority

In the 2024 census, the population of Silang was 313,145 people, with a density of 1,500 inhabitants per square kilometer or 3,900 inhabitants per square mile.It has a land area of 209 km².

=== Religion ===
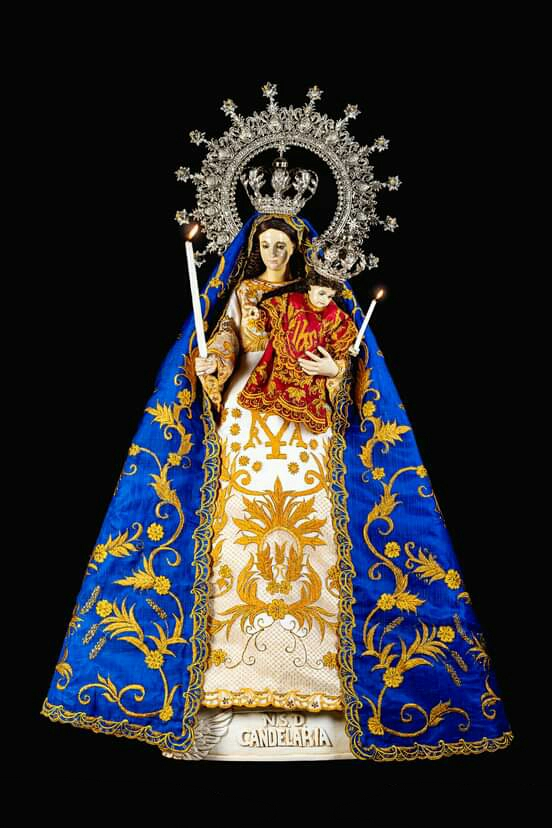
Our Lady of Candelaria, Patroness of Silang, Cavite

The majority of the people in Silang are adherents of the Christian Faith, composed of Roman Catholics, Members Church of God International, Protestants, and members of independent Christian groups. Majority of the Christian population is composed of Roman Catholics under the jurisdiction of the Diocese of Imus.

Adherents of the Philippine Independent Church, also known as the Aglipayan Church, under the jurisdiction of the Diocese of Cavite.

Other Christian groups in the town include mainstream Protestants, congregations of Mormons, and other churches are also present in the town.

With the influx of migrants from other provinces, other non-Christian faiths, particularly Islam, is practiced in the town.

== Economy ==
Poverty incidence of Silang (%)

Source: Philippine Statistics Authority

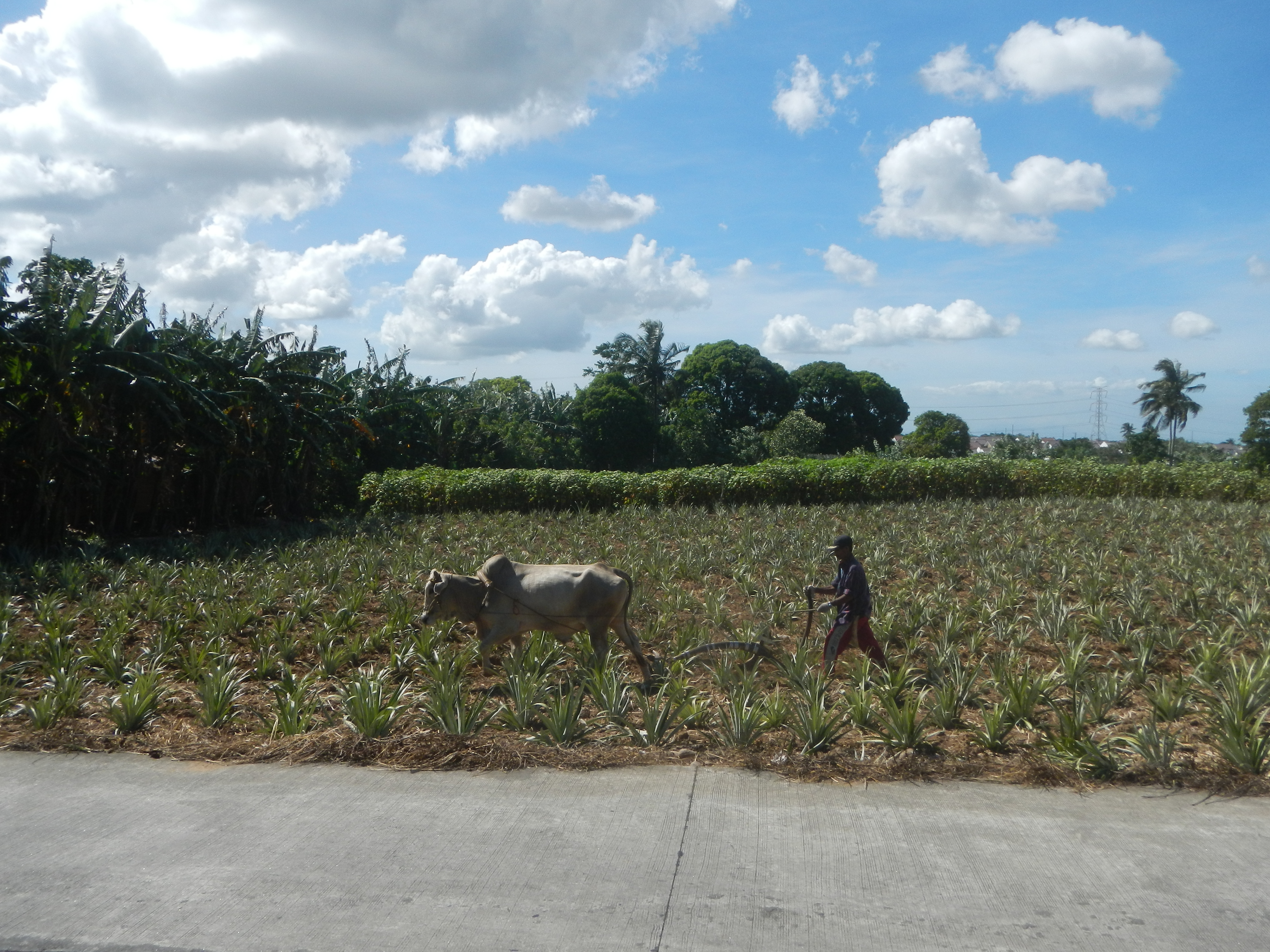
Pineapple plantation in Silang

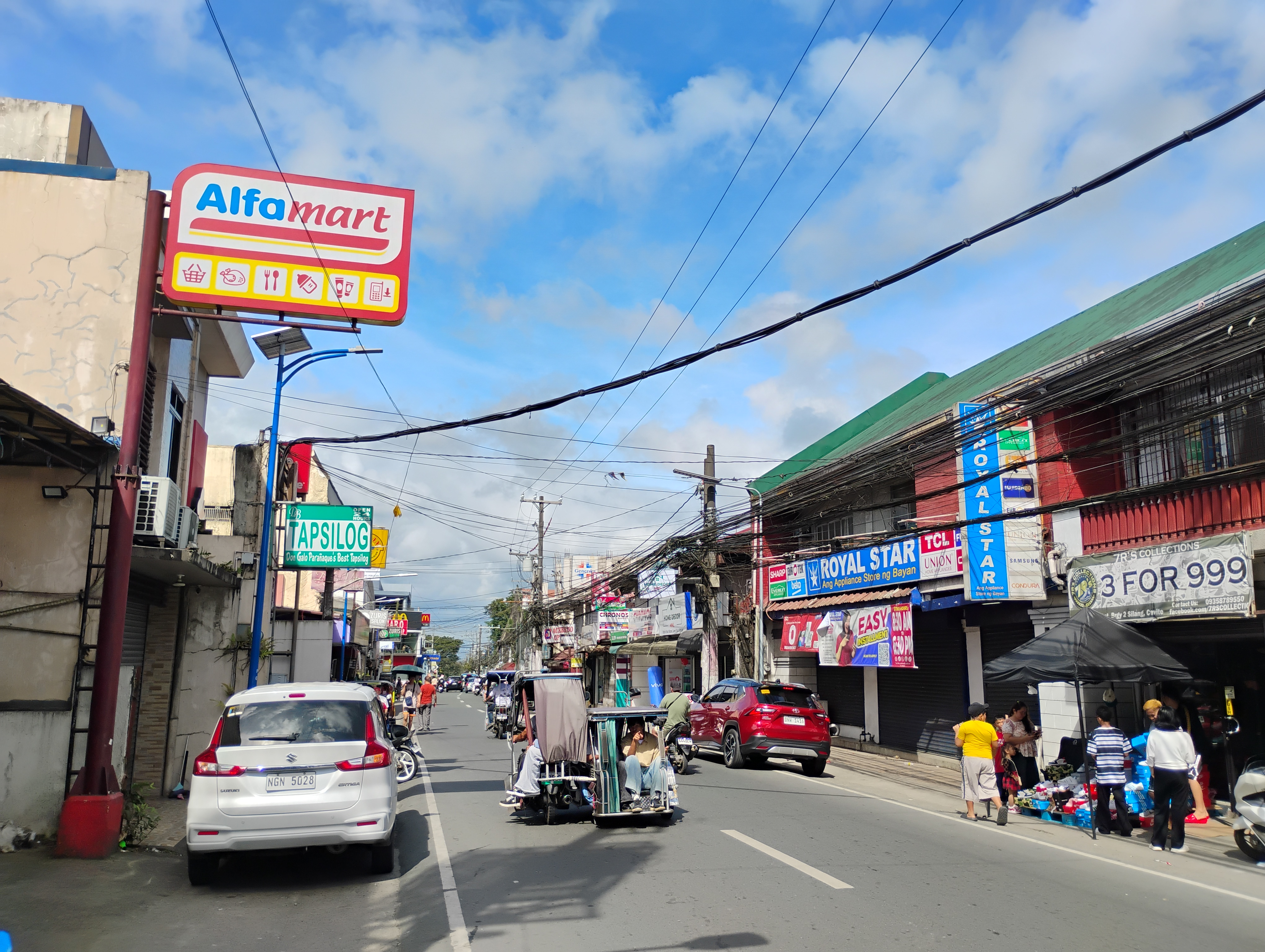
J.P. Rizal Street, the main thoroughfare of Silang poblacion

Silang’s economy is predominantly agricultural, reflecting the pattern of many Cavite towns. Key crops include coconut, coffee, corn, banana, pineapple, and various tree crops such as mango, lanzones, caimito, santol, jackfruit, guava, and avocado. The town’s fertile soil and abundant water resources support both common commercial crops and high-value or exotic crop production. Many local farmers practice intercropping to boost land productivity and reduce soil erosion. Fruit production often exceeds local demand, with surplus marketed to Metro Manila and nearby urban centers. Additionally, several poultry and swine farms operate in rural barangays, supplementing the town’s agricultural economy.

Manufacturing and trade are Silang's other major sources of income. Trade and investments grew tremendously with the influx of both Manila-based and foreign investors. Total investments were estimated at ₱2.5 billion between 1996 and 2004, which helped bring about the employment of 3,000 people. Despite the slowdown of progress in 2004, Land Value still soared, allowing investors to infiltrate and start business. The investment trend resulted in the increase in the price of prime realty from ₱3,000 to ₱15,000 per square meter and from ₱150 to ₱500 per square meter for raw lots in interior barangays. Trade establishments in Silang include gasoline stations, convenience stores, restaurants, lumber/hardware traders, shopping malls, groceries, resorts, and hotels.

The dry goods section of the Silang Public Market can now accommodate 228 stalls.

Silang houses the Maguyam Industrial Complex and the Daichi Industrial Complex, in addition to a total of ten factories operating outside the export processing zone.

== Transportation ==
Aguinaldo Highway through Silang in 2019

Silang can be reached by bus or jeepney from most nearby towns, with multiple bus lines serving the area. Taxi service and Grab rides (a Philippines service similar to Uber) are somewhat limited in the Silang area. The center of Silang is about 1 hour or so from the Manila airport, the PITX landport and about 2 hours drive to downtown Manila. Major road networks to and from Laguna and Batangas. The municipality has a road network of approximately 187.83 km (116.71 mi). Major roads include Aguinaldo Highway, Santa Rosa–Tagaytay Road, Governor's Drive (along the municipal boundary with General Mariano Alvarez), and Cavite–Laguna Expressway. Six major road projects were completed in 1996, being the Bulihan Resettlement Area Road, the 8 km (5.0 mi) Kaong-Maguyam Road, the Caramanzana Drive connecting the Silang Public Market with Aguinaldo Highway, the 2 km (1.2 mi) Sabutan-Iba Road, the DPWH funded Santa Rosa-Silang-Tagaytay Road, and the Malabag Road. The proposed Cavite–Tagaytay–Batangas Expressway will have its eastern end built in Silang.

== Landmarks ==
- Lucsuhin Natural Bridge or Cabag Caves
- Our Lady of Candelaria Parish Church

== Government ==
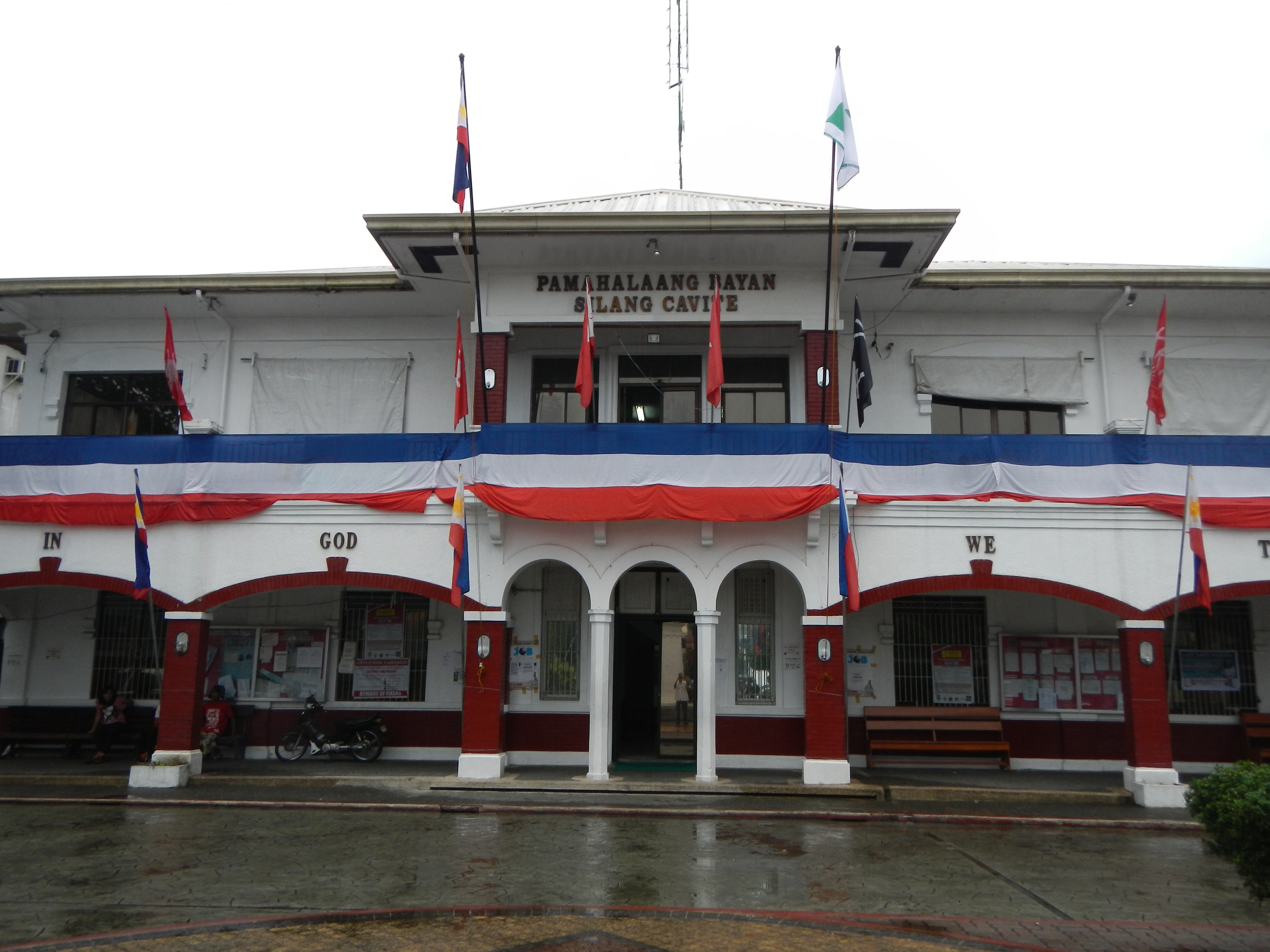
Old Silang Town Hall

=== Incumbent municipal officials ===
- Mayor: Gen. Edward "Ted" Carranza
- Vice Mayor: Cris "Kidlat" Reyes
- Sangguniang Bayan Members:
  - Ronnie "Isang Bagsak" Doneza
  - Ivan Chester Amutan
  - Allan Tolentino
  - Ara Loyola
  - Eric "Cokiat" Garcia
  - Aristides "Ari" Velazco
  - Romeo "Ohmie" Toledo
  - Carlo Madlansacay
- Liga ng mga Barangay President: Luciano "Jun" De Jesus Jr.
- Sangguniang Kabataan Federation President: Neil Buso

=== List of chief executives ===
Gobernadorcillo (leader of 'pueblo' or bayan during Spanish era):

1. Don Teodoro de Leon 1850–1852
2. Anastacio Medina 1852–1858
3. Codrato Mercado 1858–1872
4. Severino Belarmino 1872
5. Ancelmo Belardo 1875
6. Julio Medina 1877–1878
7. Lazaro Kiamzon 1879–1880
8. Ignacio Ambalada 1881
9. Angel Belardo 1881–1882
10. Ignacio Ambalada (new term) 1883–1884
11. Benito Gonzales 1884
12. Vito Belarmino 1885–1886
13. Lazaro Kiamzon (new term) 1887
14. Benito Gonzales 1887–1888
15. Gaspar Medina 1889–1890
16. Marcelo Madlansacay 1891–1892

As the effect of the Maura Law in 1893, the tribunal del pueblo was changed to tribunal municipal and leaders of municipalities were called Capitan Municipal:

1. Victor Belardo 1893–1894
2. Nicolas Montoya 1895–1896
3. Martin Medina 1896
4. Isidoro Montoya 1896–1897
5. Marcelo Madlansacay (former gobernadorcillo) 1897
6. Vicente Poblete 1897–1898
7. Jose Kiamzon 1898–1901

During the American period, the 2nd commission passed the municipal code (Act No. 82) that created municipalities. The leaders were called Presidente Municipal: The first elections were held in 1903. (Silang Historical Society)

1. Isaias Benjamin (appointed) 1901–1903
2. Nicolas Madlansacay (elected) 1903–1904
3. Primo Villanueva 1905–1906
4. Pedro Laviña 1907–1908
5. Isaias Benjamin (new term) 1909–1912
6. Jose Kiamzon (former Capitan Municipal) 1912–1916
7. Victor Kiamzon 1916–1919
8. Epifanio Montoya 1919–1922
9. Victor Kiamzon 1922–1925
10. Venancio Toledo 1926–1931
11. Victor Kiamzon 1931–1934
12. Martin Torres – Feb–Aug 1934

Municipal mayor(s):

1. Jose Kiamzon 1934–1937
2. Martin Torres 1937–1940
3. Miguel Kiamzon 1940–1943
4. Dominador Kiamzon 1943–1945
5. Martin Torres 1946–1948
6. Mariano Belen 1949–1953
7. Zacarias Batingal – January–October 1954
8. Martin Torres 1954–1955
9. Zacarias Batingal March 1955
10. Martin Torres April–October 1955
11. Pedro Caragao November–December 1955
12. Enrique Asuncion 1956–1971
13. Edgardo Mercado 1972–1986
14. Clarito Ambalada Poblete 1986–1995, June 30, 2004–June 30, 2013
15. Ruben Montoya Madlansacay June 30, 1995–June 30, 2004
16. Emilia Lourdes "Omil" Fule Poblete June 30, 2013–June 30, 2019
17. Socorro Rosario "Corie" Fule Poblete June 30, 2019–June 30, 2022
18. Alston Kevin Amutan Anarna June 30, 2022-April 26, 2024 (dismissed: Grave Misconduct and Serious Dishonesty)
19. Edward "GenTed" Esperat Carranza April 27, 2024-present

== Health care ==
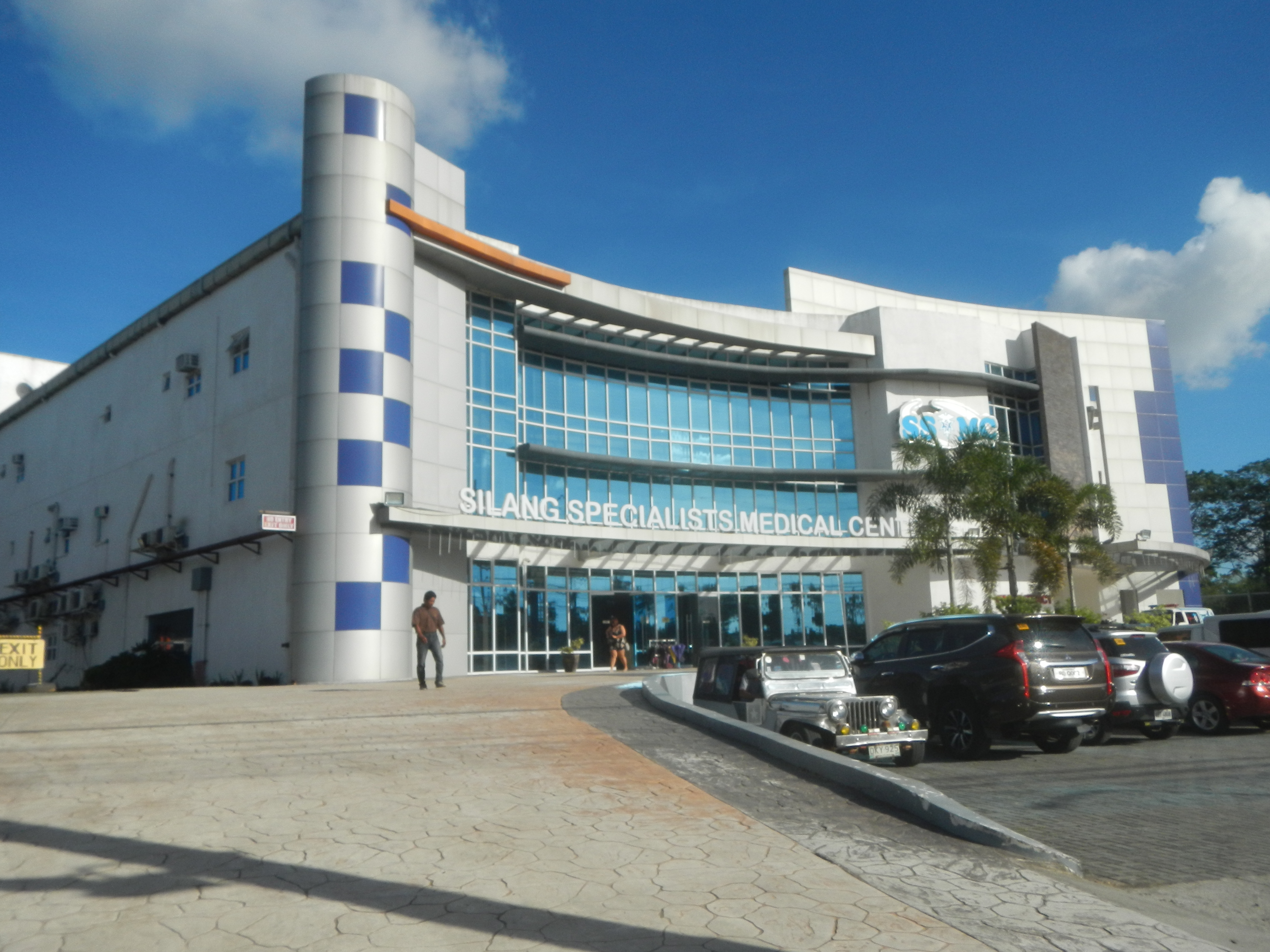
Silang Specialists Medical Center

- Estrella Hospital
- Velazco Hospital
- Silang Specialists Medical Center
- Mazenod Hospital

== Education ==
There are two schools district offices which govern all educational institutions within the municipality. They oversee the management and operations of all private and public, from primary to secondary schools. These are the Silang I Schools District Office, and Silang II Schools District Office.

=== Primary and elementary schools ===
- New Life Christian School of Cavite
- Scuola di Scienza del Mija
- Cavite Institute
- La Belle Montessori School
- Adventist International Institute of Advanced Studies (AIIAS) – Academy
- Lora Carnig School of All Nations
- Little Heirs Academy
- Sacred Hearts of Jesus and Mary Academe of Cavite
- Westridge Academy
- St.Scholastica's College-Westgroven
- Our Lady Of Peace Academy of Cavite
- Mission and Vision Reformed Christian Academy
- Biga Achievers' Learning Institute
- Infant Jesus Academy of Silang
- Living Lamp Academy
- Silang Adventist Elementary School
- Hilltop Adventist Elementary School, Inc.
- Imperial Learning Center
- Father Michael Donoher Memorial School
- Trustworthy Learning Center
- Learning Links Academy
- The Sisters of Mary School – Boystown (Adlas Campus)
- The Sisters of Mary School – Girlstown (Biga Campus)
- Father Michael Donoher Memorial School
- Rogationist College
- Sacred Heart Villa School
- St. Scholastica's College – Westgrove
- Infant Jesus Academy of Silang
- Risen Christ Catholic School
- Paraclete Foundation Community School

=== Secondary schools ===
- Adventist International Institute of Advanced Studies (AIIAS) – Academy
- Kaong National High School
- Lumil National High School
- Gen. Vito Belarmino National High School
- Malabag National High School
- Munting Ilog Integrated National High School – Main
- Bulihan National High School
- Emilia Ambalada Poblete National High School (formerly Munting Ilog National High School - Silang West Annex)

=== Higher educational institutions ===
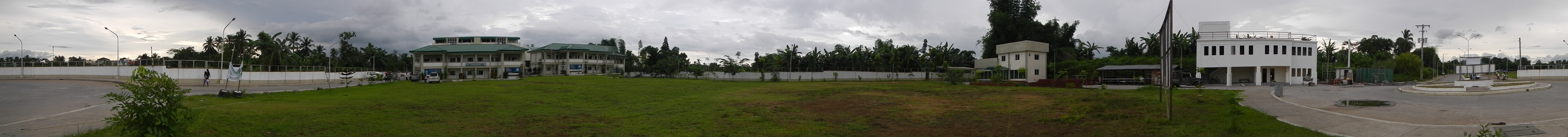
Cavite State University panorama
- Sisters of Mary Technical Education Institute Cavite Inc.
- Adventist University of the Philippines
- Adventist International Institute of Advanced Studies
- Imus Computer College (ICC) – Silang Branch
- Cavite State University (Silang satellite campus)
- Far Eastern University (Silang satellite campus)
- Philippine Missionary Institute
- Unida Biblical Seminary
- Rogationist College
- Philippine National Police Academy (Service Academy)
- St. Benilde Montessori College
- Saint Paul Seminary
- Our Lady of La Salette Seminary

== Gallery ==
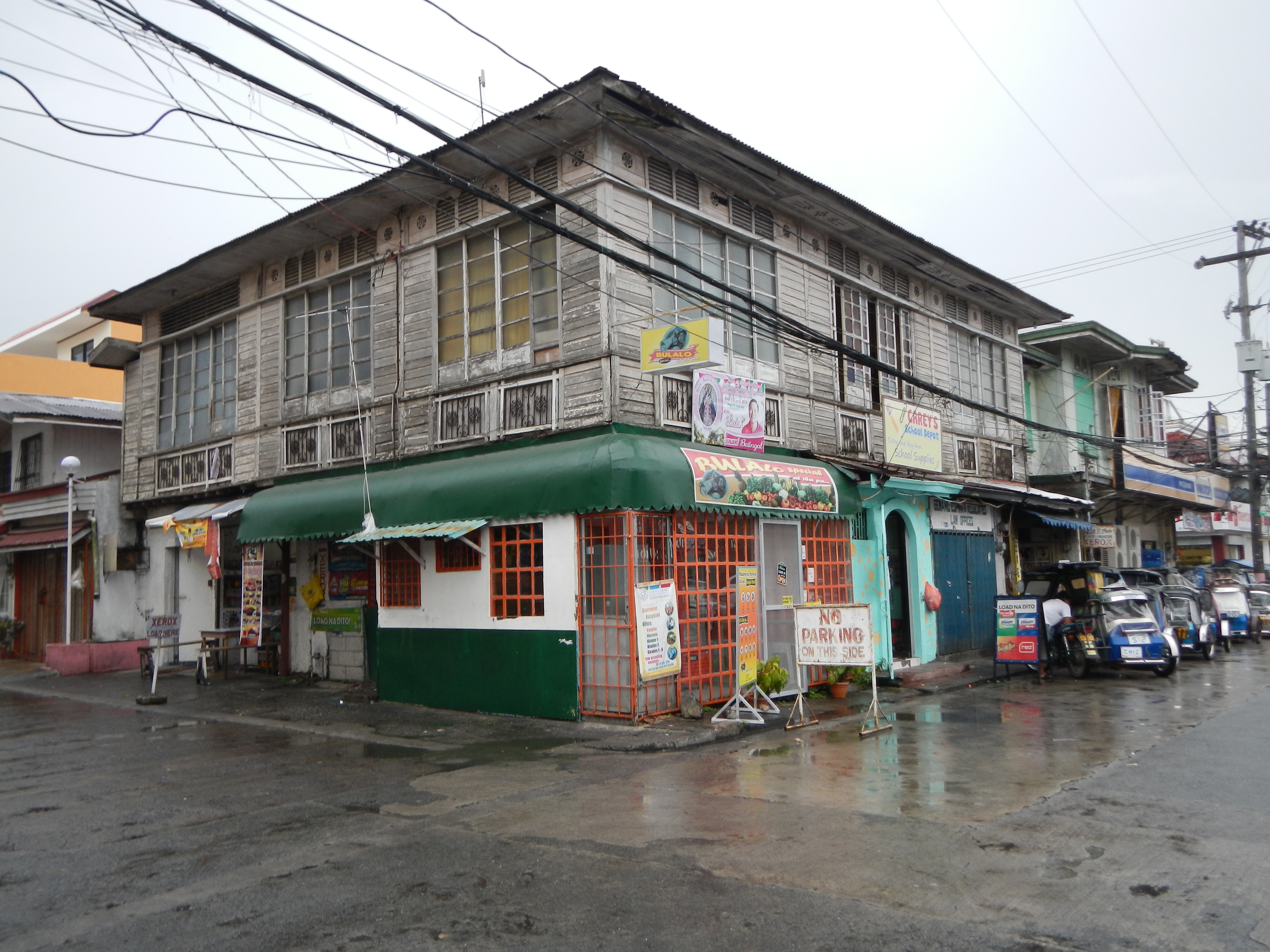
Downtown

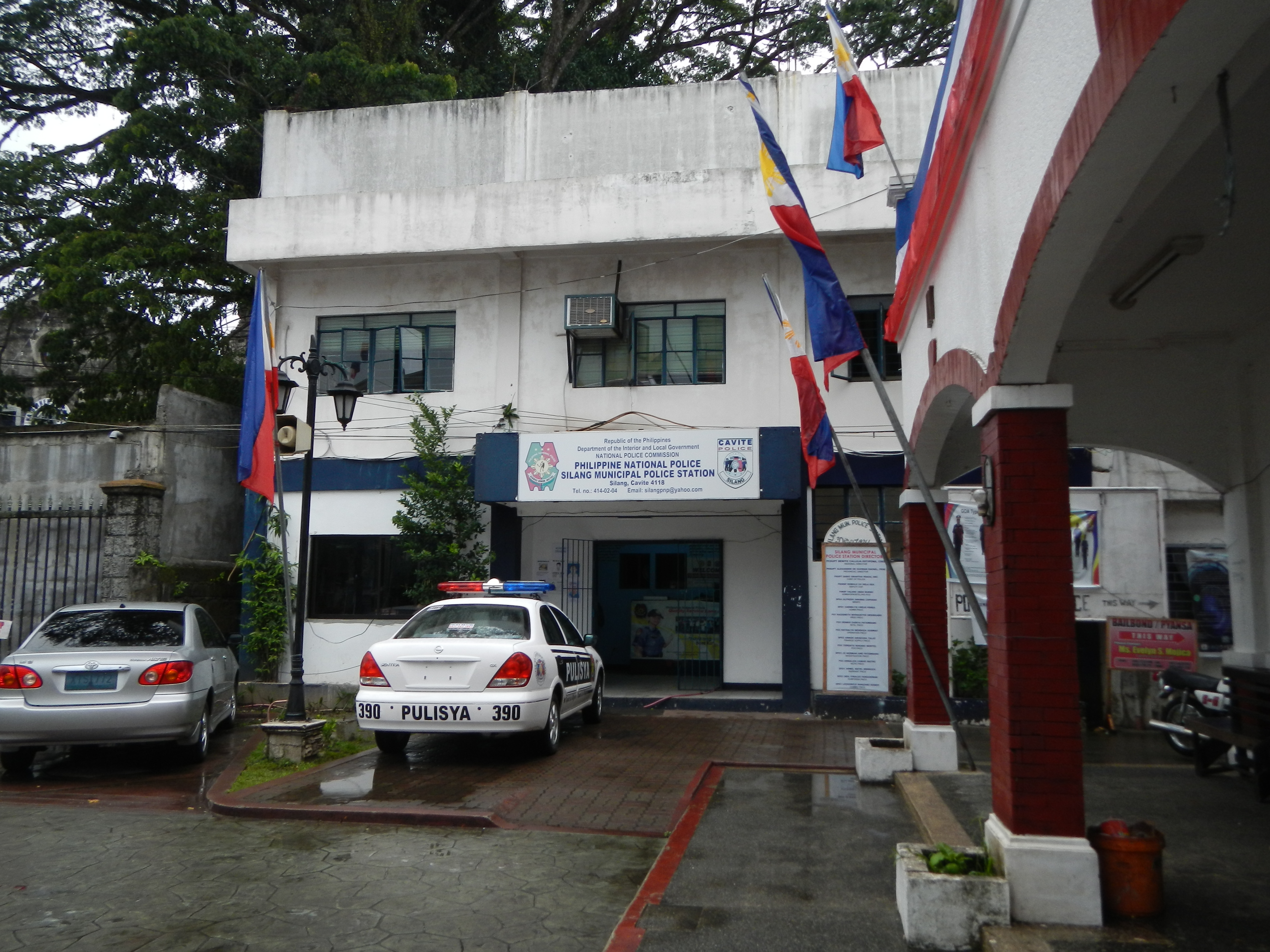
Municipal police station

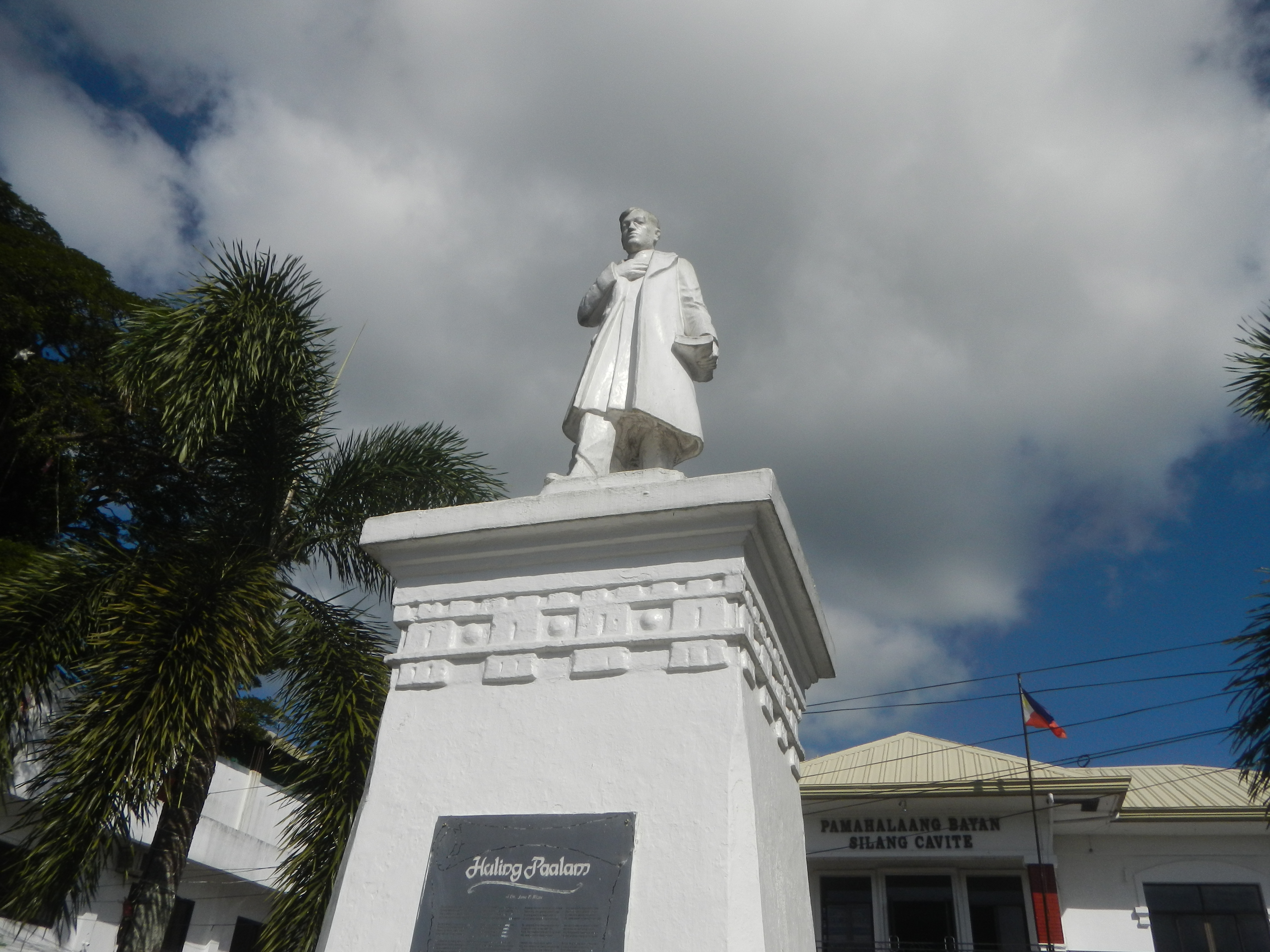
Jose Rizal Monument

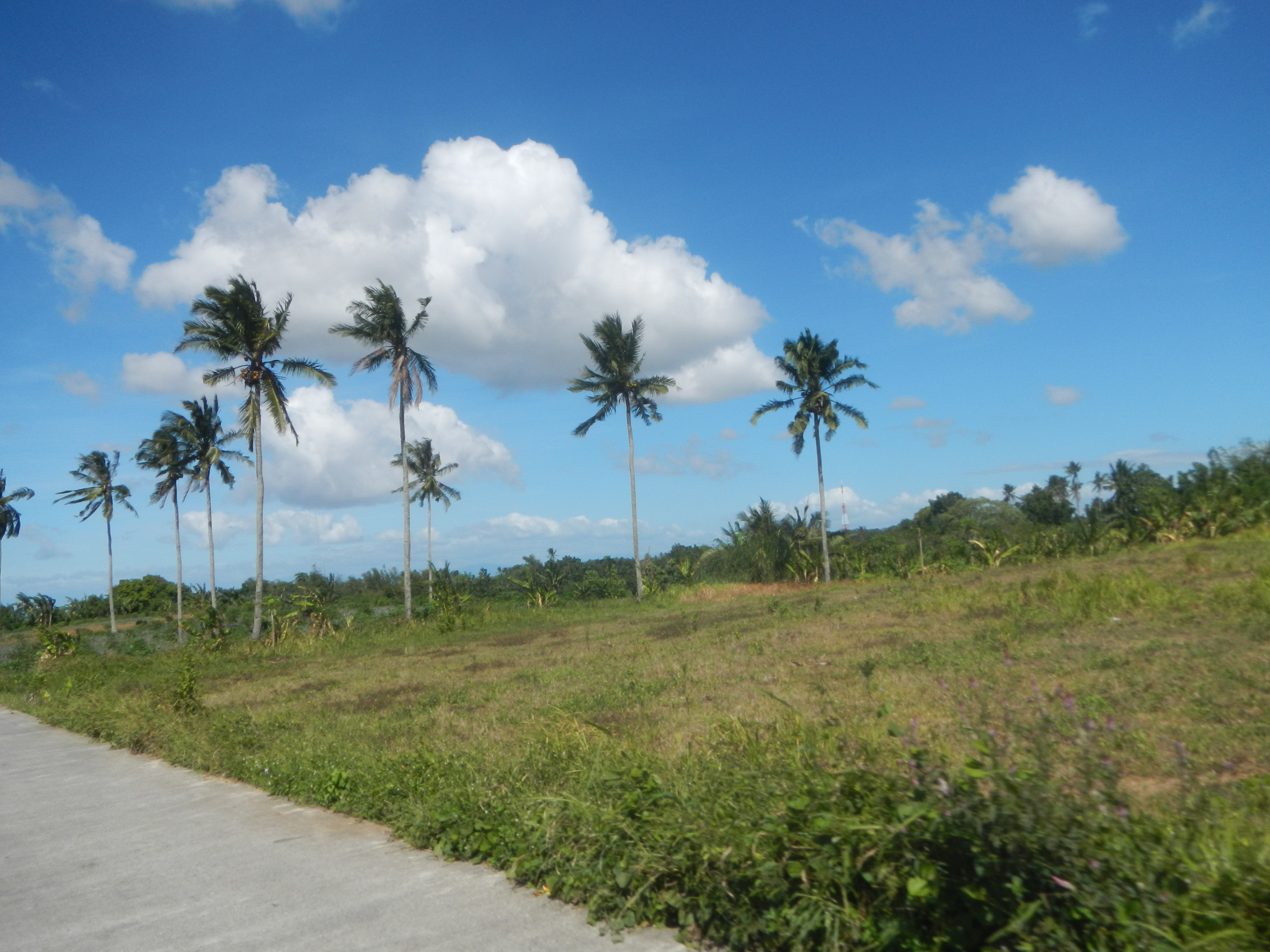
Coconut trees

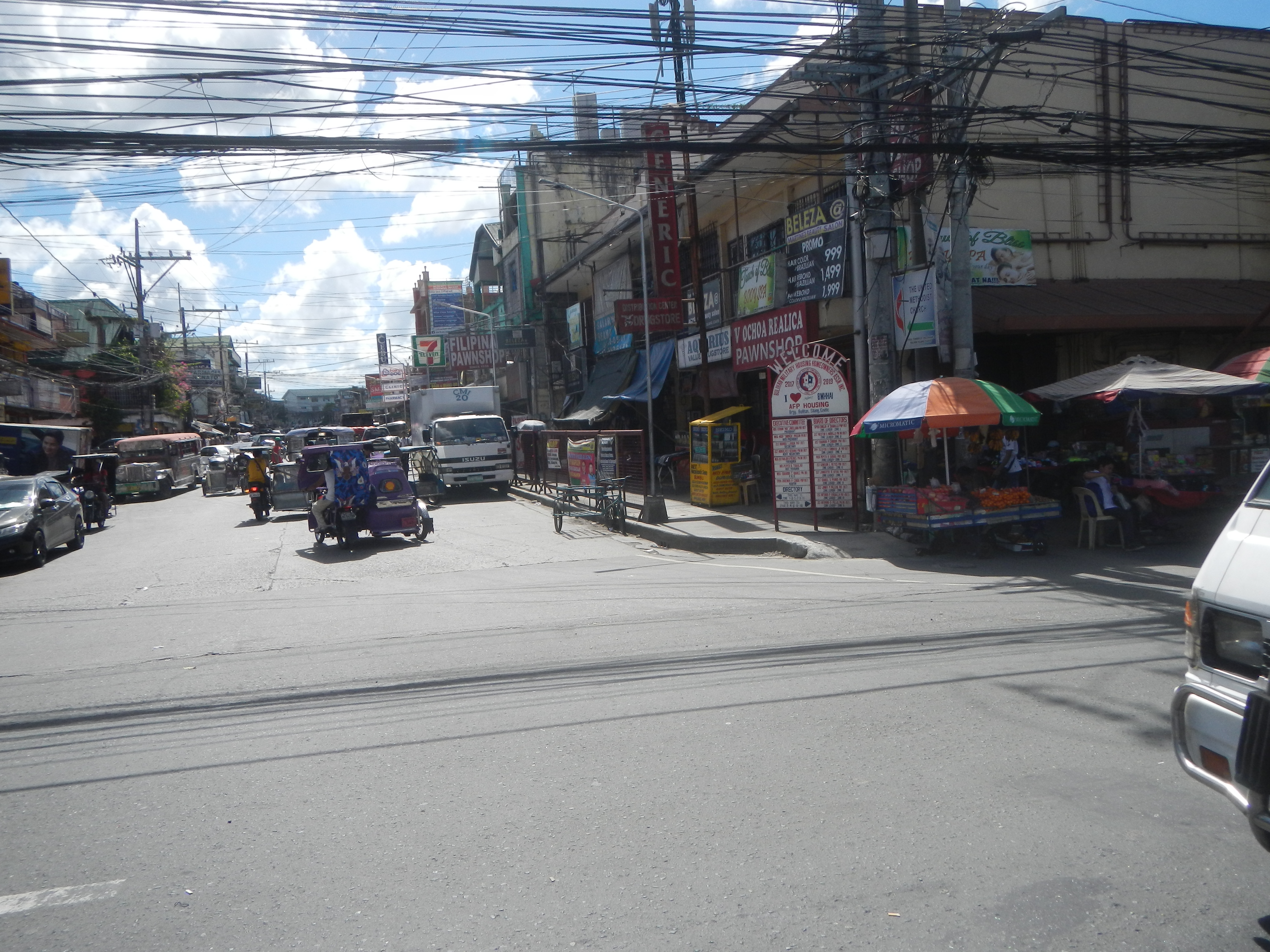
Barangay Bulihan

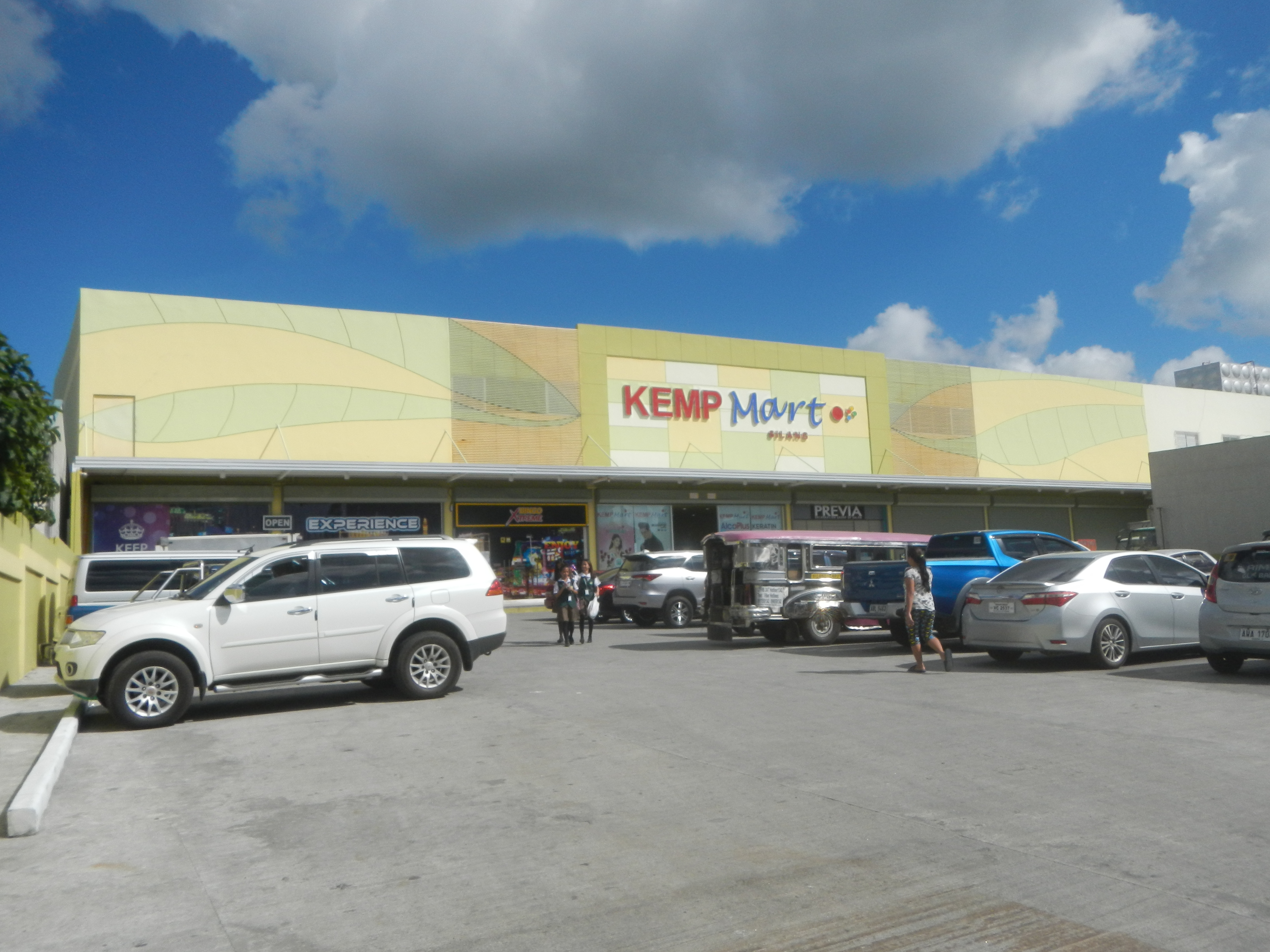
Kemp Mart Silang

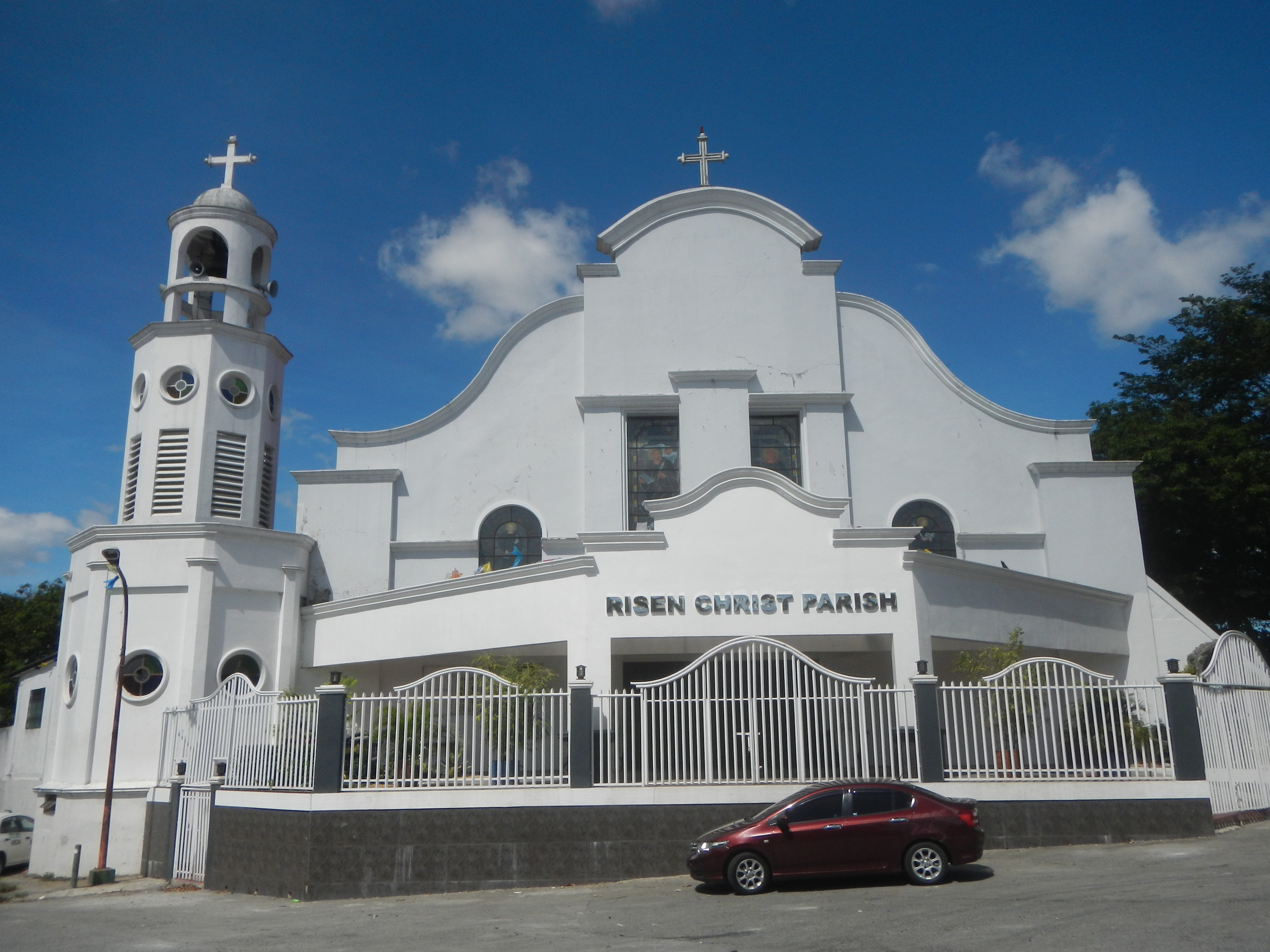
The Risen Christ Parish in Bulihan

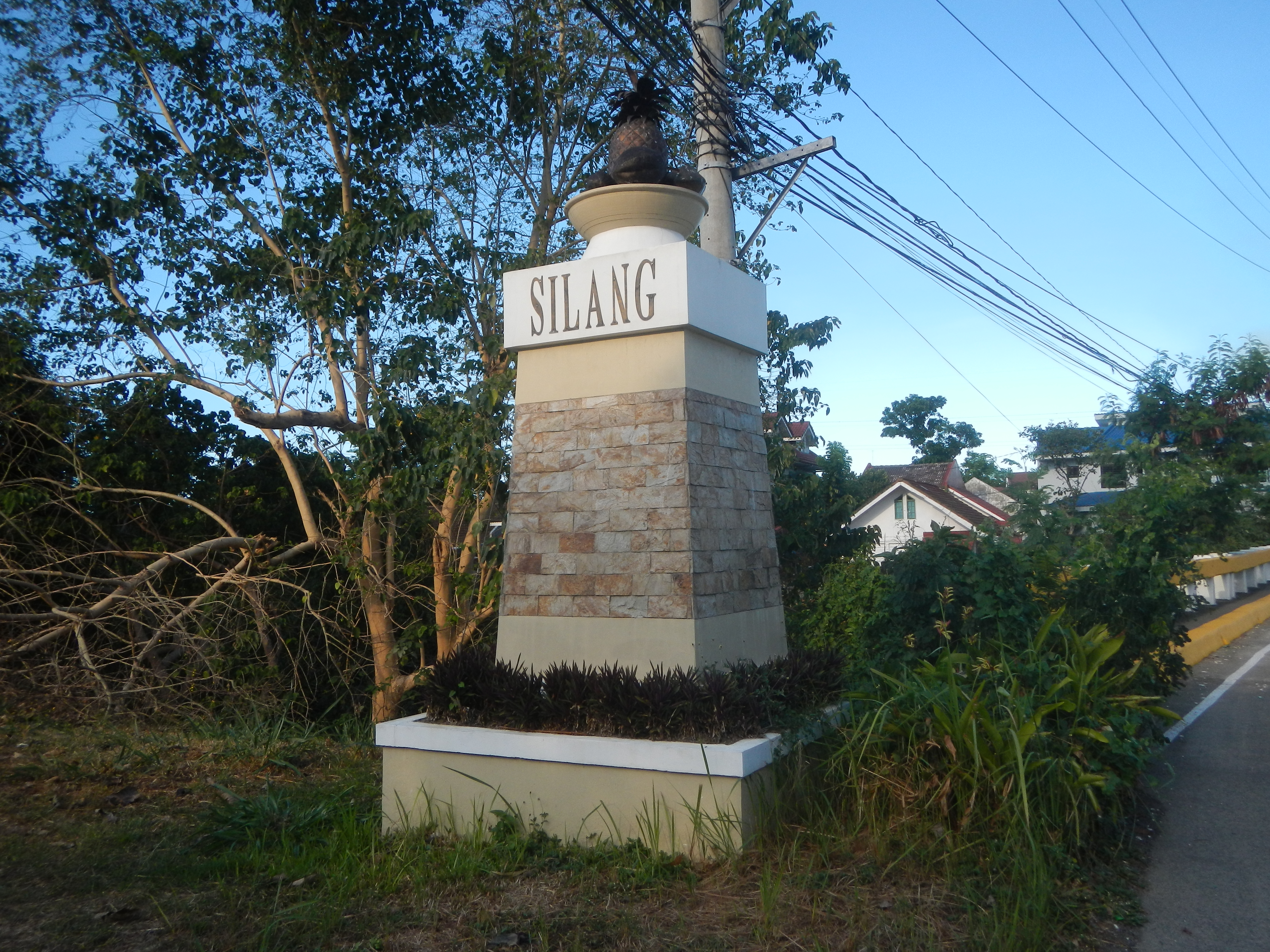
Boundary marker near Silang–Santa Rosa boundary

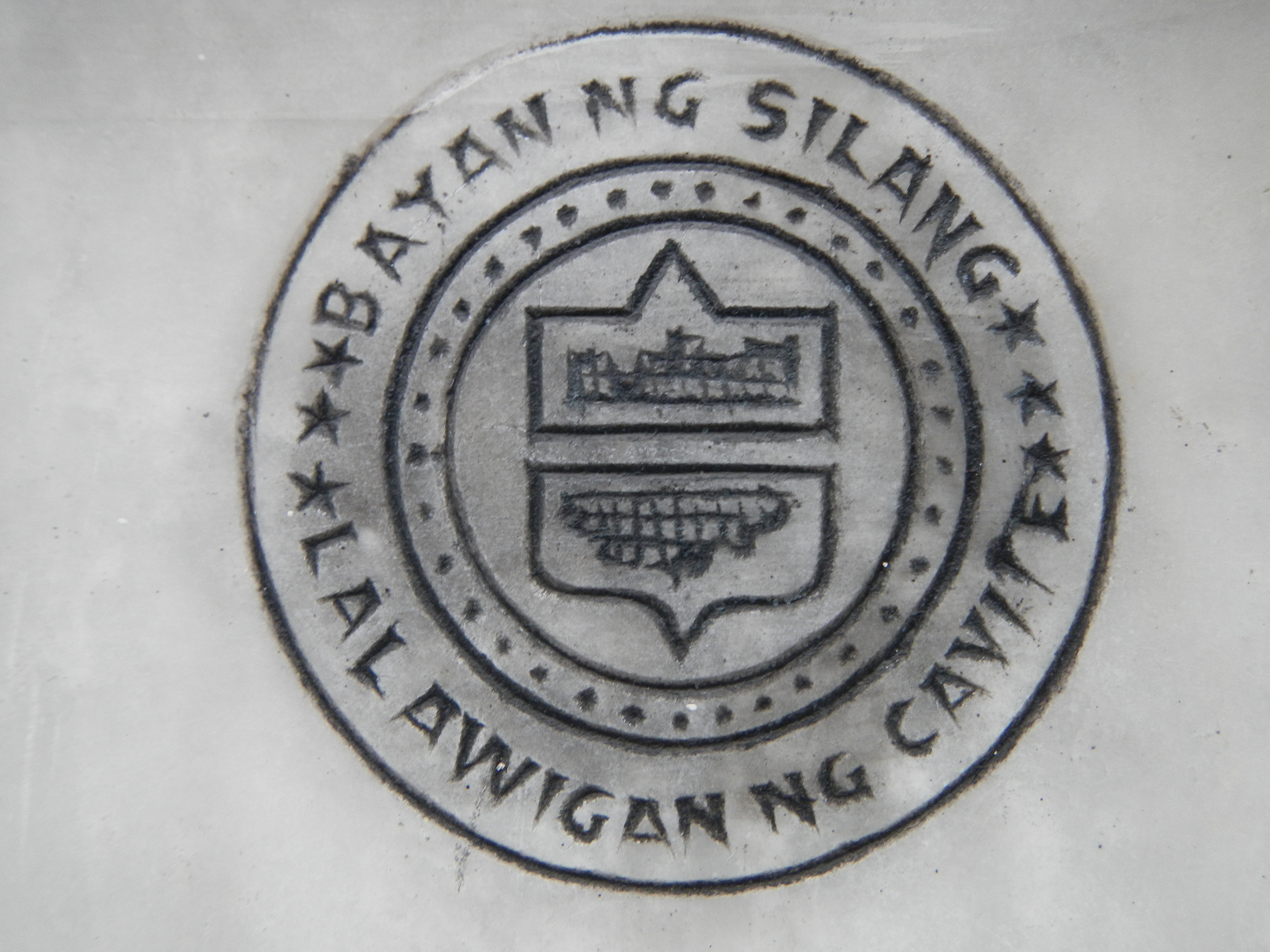
Another version of the official seal

== Notable people ==
- Bayani Agbayani (b. 1969), comedian
- Kiko Pangilinan (b. 1963), senator
