= 2025 Pasig local elections =

11th City elections in Pasig

- May 12, 2025
- Mayoral election
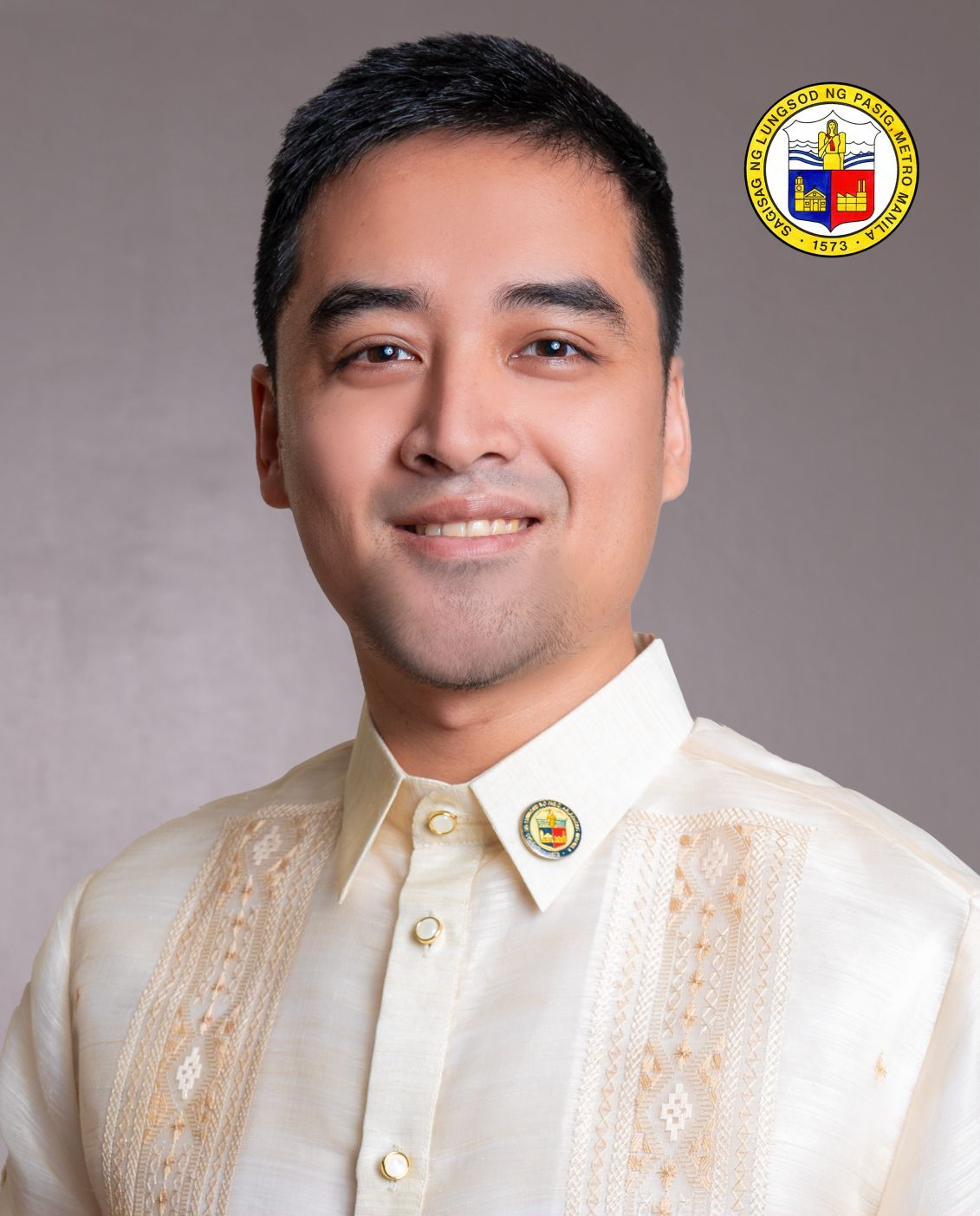

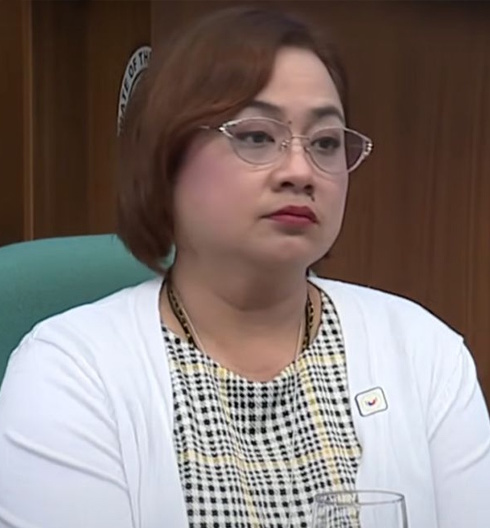
Candidate	Vico Sotto	Sarah Discaya
Party	Independent	UGB
Alliance	Giting ng Pasig	Team Kaya This
Running mate	Robert Jaworski Jr.	Iyo Bernardo
Popular vote	351,392	29,591
Percentage	92.09%	7.75%
Sotto
60–70%
80–90%
90–100%
Mayor before election
Vico Sotto
Giting ng Pasig
Elected mayor
Vico Sotto
Giting ng Pasig
- Vice mayoral election
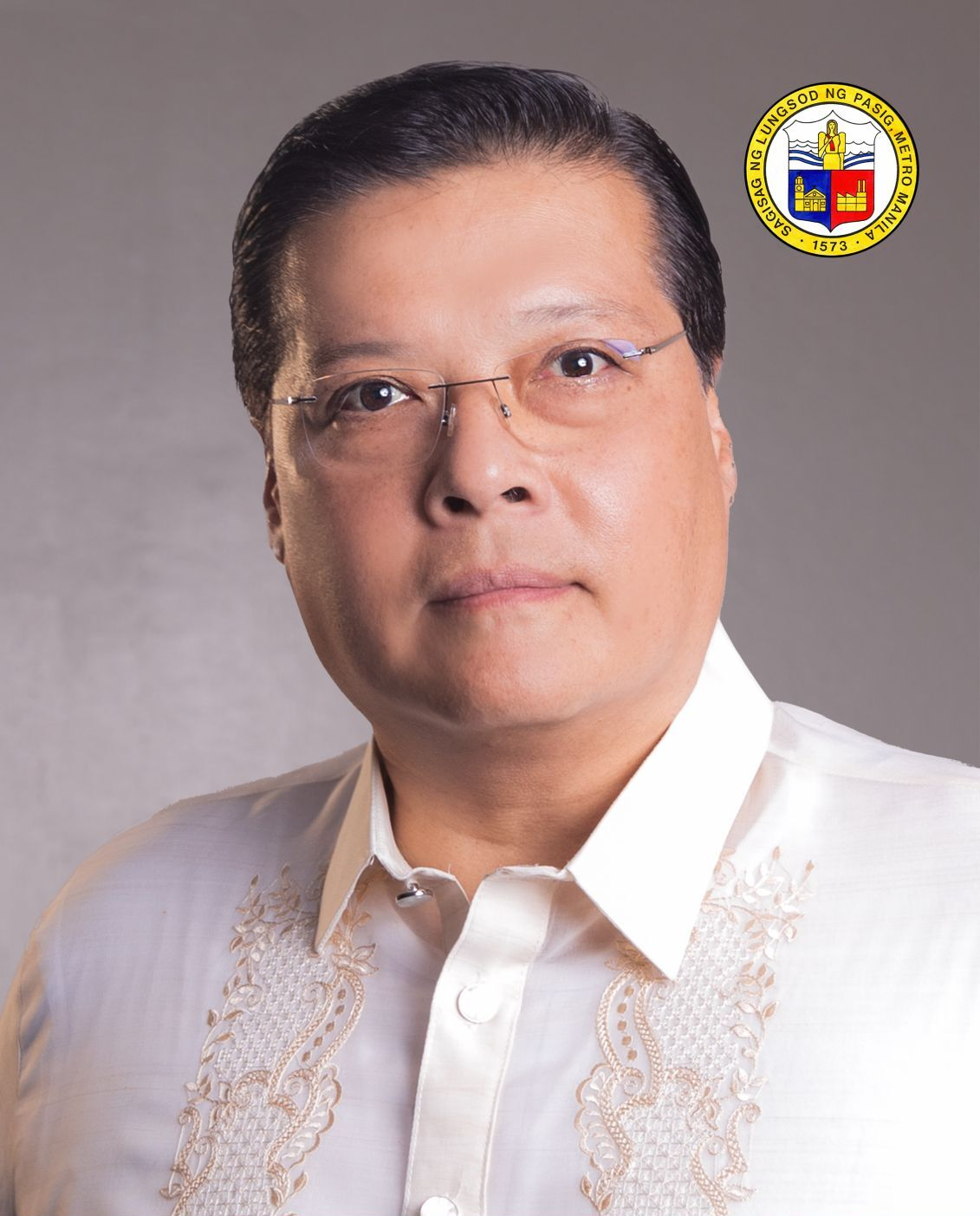
Candidate	Robert Jaworski Jr.	Iyo Bernardo
Party	Independent	Independent
Alliance	Giting ng Pasig	Team Kaya This
Popular vote	290,237	72,227
Percentage	78.84%	19.62%
Jaworski 50–60% 60–70% 70–80% 80–90%	Bernardo 50-60%
Vice Mayor before election
Robert Jaworski Jr.
Giting ng Pasig
Elected Vice Mayor
Robert Jaworski Jr.
Giting ng Pasig

Local elections were held in Pasig on Monday, May 12, 2025, as part of the 2025 Philippine general election. The electorate elected a mayor, a vice mayor, twelve members of the Pasig City Council, and one representative to the House of Representatives of the Philippines. The officials elected in the election assumed their respective offices on June 30, 2025, for a three-year-long term.

The election was primarily contested around the two rival tickets Giting ng Pasig headed by the reelectionist Mayor Vico Sotto, and Team Kaya This, headed by businesswoman Sarah Discaya. Sotto ran for this third and final term as Mayor of Pasig, having been in office since 2019, and won in a landslide victory.

== Background ==
Several graft cases had been filed against incumbent mayor Vico Sotto, the first ones he had faced in his political career, which he believed were politically motivated. The cases stemmed from allegedly distributing shirts instead of cash allowances to city hall employees, and for allegedly giving an illegal tax discount to telco company Converge ICT. In addition, a petition for a temporary restraining order had also been filed against the implementation of Mayor Sotto's flagship project, the ₱9.6-billion reconstruction of the Pasig City Hall Complex.

== Candidates ==
Note: Candidates in italics indicate incumbents seeking reelection.

=== Administration coalition ===
Giting ng Pasig
Position	#	Candidate	Party
Mayor	4.	Vico Sotto	Independent
Vice mayor	3.	Dodot Jaworski	Independent
Representative	1.	Roman Romulo	NPC
Councilor (1st district)	4.	Volta Delos Santos	AKAY
Councilor (1st district)	6.	Eric Gonzales	NPC
Councilor (1st district)	11.	Kiko Rustia	NPC
Councilor (1st district)	13.	Pao Santiago	NPC
Councilor (1st district)	14.	Paul Senogat	Akbayan
Councilor (1st district)	15.	Simon Romulo Tantoco	NPC
Councilor (2nd district)	1.	Buboy Agustin	NPC
Councilor (2nd district)	8.	Angelu de Leon	Independent
Councilor (2nd district)	10.	Ryan Enriquez	PDP
Councilor (2nd district)	13.	Warren Inocencio	Independent
Councilor (2nd district)	14.	Maro Martires	Independent
Councilor (2nd district)	15.	Boyie Raymundo	NPC

=== Primary opposition coalition ===
Team Kaya This
Position	#	Candidate	Party
Mayor	2.	Sarah Discaya	UGB
Vice mayor	1.	Iyo Caruncho Bernardo	Independent
Representative	2.	Christian Sia	Independent
Councilor (1st district)	1.	Ron Angeles	PMP
Councilor (1st district)	2.	Rex Balderrama	Nacionalista
Councilor (1st district)	5.	Jess Gaviola	Nacionalista
Councilor (1st district)	9.	Richie Pua	PMP
Councilor (1st district)	10.	Tantan Ambrosio Reyes	Independent
Councilor (1st district)	12.	JR Samson	Independent
Councilor (2nd district)	2.	Ara Mina	Lakas
Councilor (2nd district)	6.	Mario Concepcion Jr.	PMP
Councilor (2nd district)	7.	Steve De Asis	Nacionalista
Councilor (2nd district)	9.	Kaye Dela Cruz	Independent
Councilor (2nd district)	16.	Willy Sityar	Nacionalista

=== Other candidates ===
Candidates not in tickets
Position	#	Candidate	Party
Mayor	1.	Eagle Ayaon	Independent
Mayor	3.	Cory Palma	Independent
Vice mayor	2.	Marc dela Cruz	Independent
Councilor (1st district)	3.	Ram Cruz	Liberal
Councilor (1st district)	7.	Shamcey Supsup-Lee (Note: Supsup-Lee was initially part of Team Kaya This until she withdrew from the slate on April 7, 2025.)	Independent
Councilor (1st district)	8.	Jemar Pascual	RP
Councilor (2nd district)	3.	Mer Añon	Independent
Councilor (2nd district)	4.	Syvel Asilo	Nacionalista
Councilor (2nd district)	5.	JR Balingit	Independent
Councilor (2nd district)	11.	Ed Gavino	Independent
Councilor (2nd district)	12.	Bobby Hapin	Independent

== Campaign ==
Discaya had spent more than ₱1 billion by the start of the campaign period on March 28, 2025.

Discaya campaigned on a platform centered on increased infrastructure spending, with the goal of transforming Pasig into a "smart city." She outlined plans for several major projects aimed at improving the quality of life for residents. Discaya also said she was compelled to run for mayor in response to what she described as Mayor Sotto's "baseless" accusations against her construction company. Additionally, she criticized Sotto for prioritizing "good governance" over essential services such as healthcare, education, and infrastructure development.

Mayor Sotto also criticized a concert held by the St. Gerrard Construction Charity Foundation, led by Curlee Discaya and his wife Sarah, for not securing permits from the city hall, which were countered by the foundation's insistence that it was held within the private Arcovia City estate. The aforementioned couple's St. Gerrard Construction and Development Corporation have previously had their projects in Barangay Bambang suspended by Mayor Sotto for lack of building permits and violating the terms of one of their approved permits. In 2020, the firm was also blacklisted from all government projects by the Department of Public Works and Highways for a period of one year for missing project deadlines.

Meanwhile, the Discayas, former city councilor Mario Concepcion Jr., and former Bambang barangay captain Reynaldo Samson Jr. joined the ruling Partido Federal ng Pilipinas in anticipation of a 2025 run. The party has regarded Sarah Discaya, through her charity work in the city, as a "winnable mayoral candidate".

== Mayoral election ==
Incumbent mayor Vico Sotto was on his second consecutive term, having won his reelection bid in 2022, and was eligible to run for a third and final consecutive term. He won his final term as Mayor of the city in this election.

=== Candidates ===
- Sarah Discaya, chief financial officer of St. Gerrard Construction Corp.
- Vico Sotto, incumbent mayor

=== Results ===
2025 Pasig Mayoral election
Candidate	Party	Votes	%
Vico Sotto (incumbent)	Independent	351,392	92.09
Sarah Discaya	Unyon ng mga Gabay ng Bayan	29,591	7.75
Cory Palma	Independent	308	0.08
Eagle Ayaon	Independent	296	0.08
Total		381,587	100.00
Giting ng Pasig/Independent hold			

=== Controversies ===
On April 14, 2025, Mayor Sotto publicly claimed that his challenger, Sarah Discaya, used a British passport earlier that year—an allegation that, he argued, could raise questions about her eligibility to run for public office under Republic Act (RA) No. 9225. Sotto said he received reports about Discaya's January flight details but opted not to pursue a disqualification case, asserting his desire to distance his campaign from traditional political tactics. In response, Discaya's legal counsel maintained that she is a dual citizen by birth—born in London to Filipino parents—and therefore not subject to RA 9225's renunciation requirement, citing a 2022 Supreme Court ruling.

In the months after the election, two of Discaya's construction firms, Alpha & Omega Gen. Contracting and Development Corp. and St. Timothy Construction Corp., were enumerated second and third among the firms that received the most number of government flood control projects in the country.

== Vice mayoral election ==
Incumbent vice mayor Robert Jaworski Jr. was on his first term, having won his seat in the 2022 Pasig local elections, and was eligible to run for his second consecutive term. He won the vice-mayoralty anew.

=== Candidates ===
- Robert Jaworski Jr., incumbent vice mayor
- Iyo Caruncho Bernardo, 2022 mayoral candidate, former vice mayor (2013–2022)

=== Results ===
2025 Pasig Vice Mayoral election
Candidate	Party	Votes	%
Robert Jaworski Jr. (incumbent)	Independent	290,237	78.84
Iyo Christian Bernardo	Independent	72,227	19.62
Marc dela Cruz	Independent	5,658	1.54
Total		368,122	100.00
Giting ng Pasig/Independent hold			

== City Council election ==
The Pasig City Council has 14 members, 12 of which are elected via plurality block voting for three-year terms. It is divided into two city council districts, with six councilors each.

Party or alliance		Votes	%	Seats
Giting ng Pasig	NPC	683,490	32.04	6
Giting ng Pasig	Independent	504,083	23.63	3
Giting ng Pasig	PDP	111,853	5.24	1
Giting ng Pasig	AKAY	92,168	4.32	1
Giting ng Pasig	Akbayan	76,257	3.58	1
Giting ng Pasig	Total	1,467,851	68.82	12
Team Kaya This	Nacionalista	150,890	7.07	0
Team Kaya This	PMP	124,951	5.86	0
Team Kaya This	Independent	104,779	4.91	0
Team Kaya This	Lakas	58,108	2.72	0
Team Kaya This	Total	438,728	20.57	0
Nacionalista		85,646	4.02	0
Reform PH		12,131	0.57	0
Liberal		9,628	0.45	0
Independent		118,999	5.58	0
Ex-officio seats				2
Total		2,132,983	100.00	14

=== First district ===
The first city council district is composed of the western and southern barangays of the city, namely Bagong Ilog, Bagong Katipunan, Bambang, Buting, Caniogan, Kalawaan, Kapasigan, Kapitolyo, Malinao, Oranbo, Palatiw, Pineda, Sagad, San Antonio, San Joaquin, San Jose, San Nicolas, Santa Cruz, Santa Rosa, Santo Tomas, Sumilang, and Ugong.

The administration coalition won a majority of the district's seats in 2022, winning five of the six contested seats.

Term-limited councilors

- Reggie Balderama

==== Results ====
2025 Pasig City Council election in the 1st district
Candidate	Party or alliance		Votes	%
Simon Romulo Tantoco (incumbent)	Giting ng Pasig	NPC	113,222	75.38
Kiko Rustia (incumbent)	Giting ng Pasig	NPC	108,715	72.38
Pao Santiago (incumbent)	Giting ng Pasig	NPC	95,566	63.62
Volta Delos Santos (incumbent)	Giting ng Pasig	AKAY	92,168	61.36
Eric Gonzales (incumbent)	Giting ng Pasig	NPC	78,622	52.34
Paul Senogat	Giting ng Pasig	Akbayan	76,257	50.77
Shamcey Supsup-Lee	Independent		42,987	28.62
Rex Balderrama	Team Kaya This	Nacionalista	37,705	25.10
Richie Pua	Team Kaya This	PMP	28,475	18.96
Jess Gaviola	Team Kaya This	Nacionalista	27,497	18.31
Ron Angeles	Team Kaya This	PMP	26,392	17.57
Tantan Ambrosio Reyes	Team Kaya This	Independent	22,668	15.09
JR Samson	Team Kaya This	Independent	17,833	11.87
Jemar Pascual	Reform PH		12,131	8.08
Ram Cruz	Liberal		9,628	6.41
Total			789,866	100.00

=== Second District ===
The second city council district is composed of the northern and eastern barangays of the city, namely Dela Paz, Manggahan, Maybunga, Pinagbuhatan, Rosario, San Miguel, Santa Lucia, and Santolan.

The administration coalition won a majority of the district's seats in 2022, winning five of the six contested seats.

Term-limited councilors

- Corie Raymundo

==== Results ====
2025 Pasig City Council election in the 2nd district
Candidate	Party or alliance		Votes	%
Angelu de Leon (incumbent)	Giting ng Pasig	Independent	199,554	84.61
Maro Martires (incumbent)	Giting ng Pasig	Independent	159,596	67.67
Buboy Agustin (incumbent)	Giting ng Pasig	NPC	148,446	62.94
Warren Inocencio	Giting ng Pasig	Independent	144,933	61.45
Boyie Raymundo	Giting ng Pasig	NPC	138,919	58.90
Ryan Enriquez	Giting ng Pasig	PDP	111,853	47.43
Syvel Asilo (incumbent)	Nacionalista		85,646	36.31
Mario "Jun-Jun" Concepcion Jr.	Team Kaya This	PMP	70,084	29.72
Kaye dela Cruz	Team Kaya This	Independent	64,278	27.25
Ara Mina	Team Kaya This	Lakas	58,108	24.64
Willy Sityar	Team Kaya This	Nacionalista	49,099	20.82
Steve de Asis	Team Kaya This	Nacionalista	36,589	15.51
Bobby Hapin	Independent		23,331	9.89
Ed Gavino	Independent		20,518	8.70
JR Balingit	Independent		18,910	8.02
Mer Añon	Independent		13,253	5.62
Total			1,343,117	100.00

== House of Representatives election ==
The city elects one representative to the House of Representatives. The incumbent is Roman Romulo, who is on his second consecutive term. He is eligible to run for a third and final consecutive term.

Romulo won his third and final consecutive term.

=== Candidates ===
- Roman Romulo, incumbent representative
- Ian Sia, former 1st district councilor (2010–2016), 2022 vice mayoral candidate

=== Results ===
2025 Philippine House of Representatives election in Pasig's at-large district
Candidate	Party	Votes	%
Roman Romulo (incumbent)	Nationalist People's Coalition	348,939	95.40
Ian Sia	Independent	16,829	4.60
Total		365,768	100.00
Nationalist People's Coalition hold			

=== Disqualification of Christian Sia ===
On April 2, 2025, Pasig representative candidate Christian Sia drew controversy during a campaign rally in Barangay Pinagbuhatan after making sexually suggestive remarks directed at single mothers. During his speech, he joked that women who were still menstruating and experiencing loneliness could sleep with him once a year. He later clarified that he was married and described the remarks as just a joke.

Videos and clips of his speech soon went viral on social media drawing widespread condemnation from various groups and political figures. Organizations such as the women's rights group Gabriela, the Department of Social Welfare and Development, and the Philippine Commission on Women, among others, issued statements denouncing his remarks. On April 5, 2025, Sia apologized in a press conference for his remarks about single mothers, acknowledged that his comments were a poor choice and inappropriate in the context of a political campaign, but blamed the uploader of the video. The Commission on Elections (COMELEC) issued a show-cause order, citing possible violations of anti-discrimination rules. The Solo Parents Party-list filed a complaint, and Sia was suspended from campaign activities for three days by his party. In response to his comments, the Solo Parents Partylist has filed a formal complaint against Sia with the COMELEC.

On April 8, 2025, while campaigning in Barangay Sagad, Sia drew controversy after making remarks about the weight gain of a former female staff member who had since changed employers. The COMELEC issued a second show-cause order on the same day, directing Sia to explain why he should not face charges for an election offense or disqualification, citing potential violations of anti-discrimination and fair campaigning guidelines.

On May 7, 2025, just five days before election day, the COMELEC Second Division disqualified Sia as a candidate in the local elections. Despite his disqualification, he garnered 16,829 votes, but behind winning candidate Roman Romulo, who got 348,939 votes.
