= Ara Mina =

Filipino actress and singer (born 1979)

Ara Mina-Almanirez
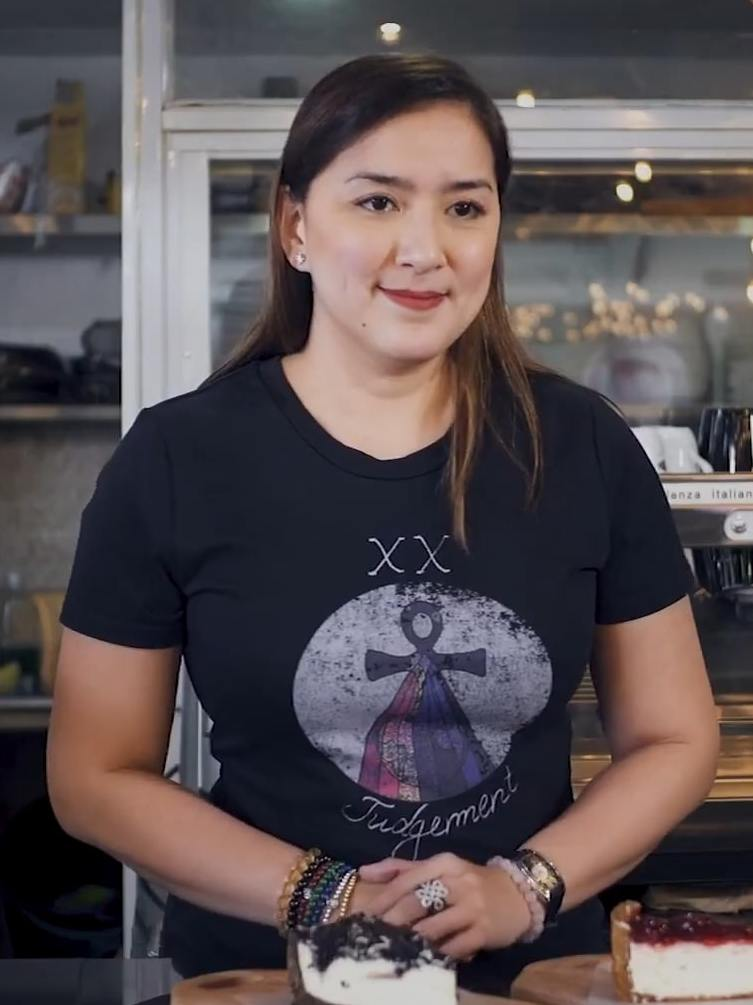
- Ara Mina in 2019
- Born: Hazel Pascual Reyes; May 9, 1979 (age 47); Mandaluyong, Philippines
- Other names: Ara, Dara Mina
- Occupations: Actress, endorser, entrepreneur and singer
- Years active: 1993–present
- Agent: Viva Artists Agency
- Political party: Lakas (2024–present)
- Other political affiliations: Independent (2009–2024)
- Spouse: Dave Almarinez (m. 2021)
- Partner: Patrick Meneses (until 2015)
- Children: 1
- Relatives: Cristine Reyes (half-sister); Venus Imperial (mother); Romeo Reyes (stepfather); Chuck Mathay (biological father); Cris Mathay (paternal half-brother); Mel Mathay (biological paternal grandfather); Princess Klenk (biological younger sister); Manilyn Reynes (cousin); Marissa Sanchez (cousin)

Hazel Pascual Reyes-Almarinez (born May 9, 1979), known professionally as Ara Mina-Almarinez, is a Filipino actress, singer, endorser, and entrepreneur. Recognized as the "Millennium Goddess", Mina is a recipient of a FAMAS Award for Best Actress, 3 Golden Screen Awards including the 'Dekada Award' and an Asia's Golden Icons Award.

== Career ==
Mina derived her stage name, which her mother chose, from her sister Cristine's real first name, Ara, and her other sister Princess's real first name, Mina. During her acting career, she used other names such as Ara Mina-Reyes, Dara Mina, which was derived from Donna Cruz, and Danica Gomez, derived from Charlene Gonzales.

Mina became part of the Philippine entertainment industry at 14 years of age via the youth-oriented program That's Entertainment, hosted and spearheaded by the late master showman German Moreno ("Kuya Germs"). Since then, Viva Entertainment signed Mina after being noticed on That's and Mina has starred in about 40 television shows and 60 movies and released 3 recording albums. She won her first acting award for Best Actress for the film Mano Po at the Metro Manila Film Festival in 2002. The following year (2003), she received 3 more Best Actress awards from Manila Film Festival, FAMAS and Golden Screen Awards for the movie Ang Huling Birhen sa Lupa. She also won the Golden Screen Awards and Star Awards in 2004 for Best Supporting Actress in a drama in the Philippines for her role as Luna in Minsan Pa.

Mina also sings aside from acting. Her self-titled and first album from Star Music (formerly Star records) which carried the hit song "Ay, Ay, Ay, Pag-Ibig" received a gold record award a few months after its release. Because of this, the record label decided to produce another album for her entitled Heavenly, which was also a big hit and included the track "Oops Teka Lang" which was also the theme song of the film of the same title starring Robin Padilla and Claudine Barretto from Star Cinema. Her version of the Rey Valera hit "Kung Kailangan Mo Ako" was also used as the theme song of the ABS-CBN miniseries Sa Sandaling Kailangan Mo Ako. In 2005, she produced her third album entitled Moving On which was released under Sony BMG. It consisted of acoustic covers of hit songs like "What Do We Mean To Each Other" by Sergio Mendes, "Somebody" by Depeche Mode, and "Very Special Love" by Maureen McGovern.

She truly showcased versatility by starring in television shows of different genres, from sitcoms to heavy drama. 1999, she starred in her first television sitcom Super Klenk, wherein she played a super heroine. She was then included in the cast of Bubble Gang, which was her longest stint for television. The character that she played in the TV series Mulawin, Vultra, is also remarkable. In 2007, she switched to freelance acting and transferred to ABS-CBN doing projects via Prinsesa ng Banyera and Ligaw na Bulaklak. She returned to GMA Network and did multiple teleseryes for over two years. From 2011 to 2016, she did stints with TV5 Network but was able to do shows with the Kapuso network through Teen Gen and Yesterday's Bride. In 2011, she returned to Viva Entertainment after 1995, which also manages her sister Cristine Reyes.

On April 17, 2015, Mina was part of the "Lucky Stars" of Kapamilya, Deal or No Deal and won ₱1,000,000 (equivalent to ₱1,203,738 in 2021), making Mina as second millionaire of the season five.

Her most recent television stint was for GMA's Pinulot Ka Lang sa Lupa and was also part of the movie My Ex and Whys starring Enrique Gil and Liza Soberano. She staged a teleserye comeback on ABS-CBN in Araw Gabi after doing anthology roles with the channel. In the late 2019 until the end of 2022, she is known for her role of Ellen Padua in FPJ's Ang Probinsyano.

== Politics ==
In 2009, she announced running for councilor of Quezon City's Second District, in a move to follow the political legacy of her family.

On October 7, 2024, Ara Mina filed her certificate of candidacy to run for 2nd district councilor of Pasig in 2025, under Lakas–CMD. She was named part of the ticket of mayoral candidate Sarah Discaya, who ran under Unyon ng mga Gabay ng Bayan (UGB). She subsequently lost the election, placing tenth.

== Personal life ==
The eldest of 9 children, she grew up in Marikina with her mother, Francis Marie Klenk, and stepfather, Romeo Reyes. At 18, she met and was acknowledged by her biological father, Chuck Mathay, a former congressman from Quezon City. Actress Cristine Reyes is her half-sister through her mother, while San Juan councilors Cris and Macky Mathay are her half-brothers through her father.

Mina has one child with former Bulakan Mayor Patrick Meneses.

On January 13, 2021, she was engaged to Businessman Dave Almarinez, CEO of the Philippine International Trading Corporation and former Laguna Provincial Board member. They were married in a wedding ceremony in Baguio on June 30 later that year.

Mina supports children with birth defects through the Ara Mina Foundation, which she founded in 2007. Her youngest sister, Princess Klenk, was born with Down syndrome, and was the inspiration behind this cause.

=== Business ===
Mina is an owner of restaurant, Hazelberry Cafe with branches located in Quezon City, Pasig City, Muntinlupa City and Pampanga.

== Electoral history ==
Electoral history of Ara Mina
Year	Office	Party	Votes received				Result
Year	Office	Party	Total	%	P.	Swing	Result
2010	Councilor (Quezon City–2nd)	IND	59,429	3.24%	10th	—N/a	Lost
2025	Councilor of Pasig's 2nd District	Lakas	58,108	24.64%	10th	—N/a	Lost

== Filmography ==
=== Film ===
Year	Title	Role
1995	Rollerboys	Susan
1995	The Flor Contemplacion Story	Evelyn Contemplacion
1996	Init sa Tag-Ulan	Marita
1996	Emong Salvacion	Belen
1997	Super Ranger Kids	Diabolika
1997	Shake, Rattle & Roll VI	Sunny
1998	Pahiram Kahit Sandali	Tess
1998	Curacha: Ang Babaeng Walang Pahinga	Marie
1998	Sagid sa Init	Camille/Sara
1998	Tatlo... Magkasalo	Elsie
1999	Tatapatan Ko ang Lakas Mo	
1999	Kahapon May Dalawang Bata	Salve
1999	Phone Sex	Alma
1999	Alyas Pogi: Ang Pagbabalik	Roselle
1999	Banatan	
2000	Palaban	Ruth Jacob
2000	Ayos Na... ang Kasunod	Amor
2000	Laro sa Baga	Dee
2002	Diskarte	Amanda
2002	Two Timer	
2002	Mano Po	Richelle Go
2003	Ang Huling Birhen sa Lupa	Lorena
2003	Fantastic Man	Helen / Diabolica
2003	Kalabit	Andrea
2004	Singles	Raia
2004	Minsan Pa	Luna
2005	Shake, Rattle & Roll 2k5	Janice
2007	Selda	Sita
2008	Anak ng Kumander	Sandra Regalado
2008	Ate	Helen
2011	Tumbok	Rita
2011	Shake, Rattle & Roll 13	Beth
2013	Menor de Edad	Edna
2013	Alfredo S. Lim (The Untold Story)	Mrs. Gameng
2016	Girlfriend for Hire	Auntie Melba
2017	My Ex and Whys	Dolly
2017	This Time I'll Be Sweeter	
2019	Unforgettable	Dahlia
2021	Paglaki Ko, Gusto Kong Maging Pornstar	Herself
2021	Pornstar 2: Pangalawang Putok	Herself
2022	The Entitled	Matilda
2022	Katok	Romina
2024	Mamay: A Journey to Greatness	Katimuan Binasing
2025	Shake, Rattle & Roll: Evil Origins	Madre Piedad
2025	Poon †	

=== Television ===
Year	Title	Role
1993–1996	That's Entertainment	Herself / Regular
1998–2007; 2025	Bubble Gang	Herself / Regular
1999–2000	Super Klenk	Charito / Super Klenk
2000–2001	Kiss Muna	Ara
2002–2003	Kung Mawawala Ka	Lucinda Montemayor
2004	Te Amo, Maging Sino Ka Man	Destiny
2004–2005	Mulawin	Vultra / Violeta / Veronica
2005	Mars Ravelo's Darna	Dyesebel
2006	Magpakailanman	
2007	Lupin	Sister Anna Nicole
2007–2008	Prinsesa ng Banyera	Cassandra Ynares / Elena
2008	Ligaw na Bulaklak	Janet / Jennifer Alegro
2008	Maalaala Mo Kaya: Dagat	Leah
2009	Carlo J. Caparas' Totoy Bato	Elena Magtanggol
2009	Sine Novela: Dapat Ka Bang Mahalin?	Glacilda Bautista
2009–2010	Sine Novela: Tinik sa Dibdib	Trixie Veneracion-Marquez / Trixie Domingo
2010	Ilumina	Elsa Sebastian
2011	Untold Stories Mula sa Face to Face	
2011	Ang Utol Kong Hoodlum	Rhea Bustillos
2011	Maalaala Mo Kaya: Tulay	Ester
2012	P. S. I Love You	Cassandra
2012–2013	Yesterday's Bride	Josilda "Josie" Ramirez
2013	Magpakailanman: The Wally Bayola Story	Riza
2013	Teen Gen	Violeta "Violet" Bernardo-Torres
2013	The Gift	Theresa
2013	Maalaala Mo Kaya: Drawing	Shirley
2013	Wansapanataym: Dolly Daldal	Lisa
2013	Maalaala Mo Kaya: Double Bass	Liezel
2014	Wansapanataym: Enchanted House	Dorothy Barin
2014	Trenderas	Diane San Miguel
2015	Maalaala Mo Kaya: Sanggol	
2015	Kapamilya Deal or No Deal	Herself / Case Number 4
2016	Ipaglaban Mo: Kasambahay	Veronica
2016	Tasya Fantasya	Yvonne
2016	Pepito Manaloto	Gina
2016	Karelasyon	Lorraine
2016	Dear Uge	Sylvia Mercado
2017	Pinulot Ka Lang sa Lupa	Mariz Alejo-Zimmerman
2017	Ipaglaban Mo!: Pagkakasala	Linda
2017	Maalaala Mo Kaya: Kakanin	Gina
2017	Mulawin vs. Ravena	Vultra / Violeta / Veronica (archived footage only)
2018	Precious Hearts Romances Presents: Araw Gabi	Harriet De Alegre / Amanda Rodriguez
2019	Ipaglaban Mo: Pariwara	Doray
2020–2022	FPJ's Ang Probinsyano	Ellen Padua
2021	Bella Bandida	Alas
2022	Tadhana: Isabella	Rhea Bermudez
2022	Barangay PIE Silog Sunday: Pasok Mga Suki	Herself, featured celebrity entrepreneur
2023	Magandang ARAw	Herself
2023	Jack and Jill sa Diamond Hills	Cleo Maharlika
2024	Lovers & Liars	Elizabeth Laurente
2024	Private Time with Ara	Herself
2024	Padyak Princess	Susan Velarde / Rosa
2024	It's Showtime	Herself
2024	Tadhana: Sugar Daddy	Sylvia Landicho
2025	Regal Studio Presents: Mami and Papi Together	Helga
2026	My Husband is a Mafia Boss	Alyana Ferrer
2026	Love Is Never Gone	Rita Crisanto

== Awards and nominations ==
Year	Award-Giving Body	Category	Work	Result	Ref.
1999	Guillermo Mendoza Memorial Awards	Popular Princess of RP Movies		Won	
2000	Guillermo Mendoza Memorial Awards	Most Promising Female Singer		Won	
2002	Metro Manila Film Festival	Best Actress	Mano Po	Won	
2003	Manila Film Festival	Best Actress	Ang Huling Birhen Sa Lupa	Won	
2003	Guillermo Mendoza Memorial Awards	Ms. RP Movies	Mano Po	Won	
2003	Golden Screen Awards	Best Actress	Ang Huling Birhen Sa Lupa	Won	
2004	Golden Screen Awards	Best Supporting Actress	Minsan Pa	Won	
2004	52nd FAMAS Awards	Best Actress	Ang Huling Birhen Sa Lupa	Won	
2004	20th PMPC Star Awards for Movies	Best Actress	Ang Huling Birhen sa Lupa	Nominated	
2005	21st PMPC Star Awards for Movies	Best Supporting Actress	Minsan Pa	Won	
2005	19th PMPC Star Awards for TV	Best Drama Actress	Mulawin	Nominated	
2007	24th PMPC Star Awards for Movies	Movie Supporting Actress of the Year	Selda	Nominated	

=== Discography ===
- Ara Mina (1999, Star Music)
- Heavenly (2001, Star Music)
