= 2022 Pasig local elections =

10th City elections in Pasig

- May 9, 2022
- Opinion polls
- Turnout: 85.14% ▲8.75 pp
- Mayoral election
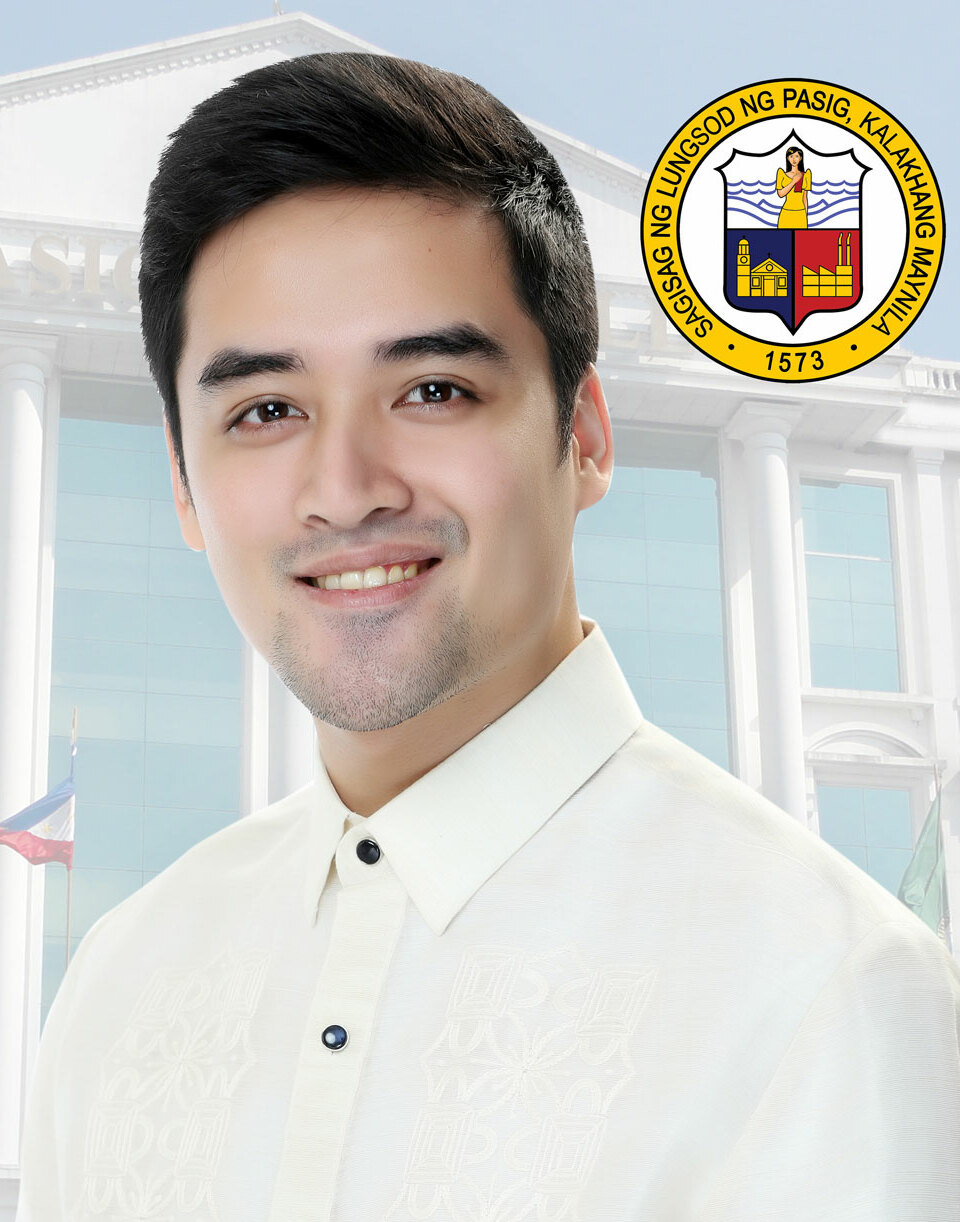
		PRP
Candidate	Vico Sotto	Iyo Bernardo
Party	Aksyon	PRP
Alliance	Giting ng Pasig	Team Pasigueño
Running mate	Robert Jaworski Jr.	Ian Sia
Popular vote	335,851	45,604
Percentage	88.04%	11.95%
Mayor before election
Vico Sotto
Aksyon
Elected mayor
Vico Sotto
Aksyon
- Vice mayoral election
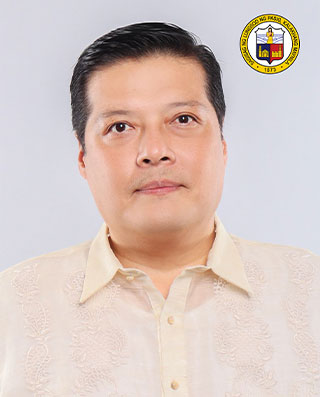
		PDDS	PPP
Candidate	Robert Jaworski Jr.	Jun-Jun Concepcion	Ian Sia
Party	Aksyon	PDDS	PPP
Alliance	Giting ng Pasig	Team Independent	Team Pasigueño
Popular vote	205,250	87,716	76,028
Percentage	55.62%	23.77%	20.60%
Vice Mayor before election
Iyo C. Bernardo
PRP
Elected Vice Mayor
Robert Jaworski Jr.
Aksyon
- City Council election

12 of 14 seats in the Pasig City Council 8 seats needed for a majority
	First party	Second party	Third party
Party	NPC	Aksyon	Nacionalista
Alliance	Giting ng Pasig	Giting ng Pasig	Team Pasigueño
Last election	Did not participate	Did not participate	10 seats
Seats won	8	2	1
Seat change	▲8	▲2	▼9
Popular vote	612,131	269,790	187,622
Percentage	32.73%	14.42%	10.03%
	Fourth party	Fifth party	Sixth party
Party	PDDS	PRP	PROMDI
Alliance	Team Pasigueño	Team Pasigueño	Team Pasigueño
Last election	Did not participate	Did not participate	Did not participate
Seats won	1	0	0
Seat change	▲1	Steady	Steady
Popular vote	77,982	100,482	95,037
Percentage	4.17%	5.37%	5.08%

Local elections took place in Pasig on Monday, May 9, 2022, as part of the 2022 Philippine general election.

== Background ==
Incumbent Vico Sotto was elected mayor of Pasig in 2019 and will seek a second consecutive term. Meanwhile, incumbent vice mayor Iyo Caruncho Bernardo was elected for a third consecutive term in 2019.

== Retiring and term-limited incumbents ==
=== Term-limited incumbents ===
These are incumbents who are on their third consecutive terms and cannot run for re-election but may run for other positions.

==== Vice mayor ====
- Iyo Caruncho Bernardo (PRP), running for mayor of Pasig

==== 1st District councilors ====
- Ferdinand Avis (PDP–Laban)
- Rhichie Brown (Nacionalista), his wife Dottie is running for councilor in Pasig's 1st District as an independent candidate
- Ory Rupisan (PDP–Laban)

==== 2nd District councilors ====
- Olly Benito (Nacionalista), his wife Apple is running for councilor in Pasig's 2nd District as a candidate of the People's Reform Party under the Team Pasigueño slate
- Yoyong Martirez (Nacionalista), his son Maro is running for councilor in Pasig's 2nd District as a candidate of the Nationalist People's Coalition under the Giting ng Pasig slate
- Wilfredo Sityar (Nacionalista)

=== Retiring incumbents ===
These incumbents were allowed to run for re-election for their positions, but chose not to.

==== 1st District councilors ====
- Joy San Buenaventura (Nacionalista)
- Edith Santiago (Nacionalista), her son Pao is running for councilor in Pasig's 1st District as a candidate of the Nationalist People's Coalition under the Giting ng Pasig slate

==== 2nd District councilors ====
- Jun-Jun Concepcion (PDDS), running for vice mayor of Pasig

== Candidates ==
=== Mayor ===
==== Official candidates ====
#	Name	Ticket	Party
1.	Iyo Bernardo	Team Pasigueño	PRP
2.	Vico Sotto	Giting ng Pasig	Aksyon

==== Potential candidates ====
- Bobby Eusebio (Nacionalista), mayor of Pasig City (2007–2013, 2016–2019)

=== Vice mayor ===
#	Name	Ticket	Party
1.	Jun-Jun Concepcion	Team Independent	PDDS
2.	Robert Jaworski Jr.	Giting ng Pasig	Aksyon
3.	Ian Sia	Team Pasigueño	PPP

=== House of Representatives ===
#	Name	Ticket	Party
1.	Ricky Eusebio	None	Nacionalista
2.	Rex Maliuanag	None	Independent
3	Roman Romulo	Giting ng Pasig	Independent

=== 1st District councilors ===
Giting ng Pasig
#	Name	Party
9.	Volta Delos Santos	NPC
11.	Eric Gonzales	NPC
17.	Kiko Rustia	NPC
18.	Pao Santiago	NPC
19.	Paul Senogat	Aksyon
21.	Simon Romulo Tantoco	NPC

Team Pasigueño
#	Name	Party
3.	Reggie Balderrama	PDDS
8.	Jana De Leon	PROMDI
10.	Jessie Gaviola	Nacionalista
12.	Bobot Guevarra	PRP
22.	Migs Caruncho Trinidad	PDP–Laban

Team Independent
#	Name	Party
2.	Ron Angeles	Independent

Non-independents
#	Name	Party
5.	Andy Cheng	PDP–Laban
6.	Ram Alan Cruz	PROMDI
7.	Rey De Jesus	AGILA
15.	Rene Lipana	Nacionalista
20.	Gary Sta. Ana	PDP–Laban

Independents
#	Name	Party
1.	Angelica Angeles	Independent
4.	Dottie Brown	Independent
13.	Benjie Javier	Independent
14.	Bien Raymundo Legaspi	Independent
16.	Tantan Reyes	Independent

=== 2nd District councilors ===
==== Official candidates ====
Giting ng Pasig
#	Name	Party
1.	Buboy Agustin	NPC
7.	Quin Cruz	Aksyon
9.	Angelu De Leon	Aksyon
18.	Maro Martires	NPC
22.	Corie Raymundo	NPC

Team Pasigueño
#	Name	Party
2.	Syvel Asilo	Nacionalista
4.	Charmie Benavides	PDDS
5.	Apple Benito	PRP
8.	Steve De Asis	Nacionalista
10.	Kaye Dela Cruz	PROMDI

Team Independent
#	Name	Party
11.	Ryan Enriquez	PDP–Laban
15.	Warren Inocencio	Independent
24.	Robin Salandanan	Independent

Non-independents
#	Name	Party
12.	Jay Eusebio	WPP
20.	Jeff Pastor	KBL
23.	Mike Romualdez	KBL
25.	Grace Sta. Ana	WPP

Independents
#	Name	Party
3.	Rani Banzil	Independent
6.	Pablo Cantoria	Independent
13.	Bobby Hapin	Independent
14.	Rebrando Hernandez	Independent
16.	Eduardo Manaois	Independent
17.	Isidro Mariano	Independent
18.	Dodoy Pasamante	Independent
21.	Cesar Pelayo Jr.	Independent
26.	Alan Sy	Independent
27.	Bert Vidayo	Independent

==== Withdrawn candidates ====
Name	Ticket	Party
Gab Bayan	Giting ng Pasig	Aksyon
Gaby Ignacio	None	Independent

== Opinion polling ==
=== For Mayor ===
Fieldwork Date(s)	Pollster	Bernardo PRP	Sotto Aksyon	Und./ None	Other
Apr. 25–28	Publicus Asia	6%	90%	4%	–
Apr. 8–13	Publicus Asia	8%	92%	0%	–
March 25	Start of Campaign Period for Local Candidates				
Mar. 15–22	RPMDinc	35%	62%	3%	–
Mar. 16–21	Publicus Asia	3%	92%	5%	–
Feb. 22–28	RPMDinc	33%	65%	2%	–
Feb. 18–24	Publicus Asia.	4%	92%	4%	–
Jan. 22–30	RPMDinc	31%	68%	1%	–
2022					
Dec. 16–23	RPMDinc	27%	70%	3%	–
Nov. 16–24	RPMDinc	32%	67%	1%	–
Oct. 17–26	RPMDinc	33%	65%	2%	–
Sept. 3–15.	RPMDinc	28%	67%	5%	–
Aug. 1–10	RPMDinc	32%	66%	2%	–
May 20–30	RPMDinc	–	67%	5%	28%

== Results ==
=== Mayor ===
Incumbent Vico Sotto defended the mayoralty against Vice Mayor Iyo Bernardo, winning a second term by a margin of 76.08%.

Pasig mayoral election
Party	Candidate	Votes	%
Aksyon	Vico Sotto (incumbent)	335,851	88.04%
PRP	Iyo Christian Bernardo	45,604	11.96%
Total votes		381,455	100.00
Aksyon hold			

=== Vice Mayor ===
Incumbent Iyo Bernardo is term-limited and chose to run for mayor. He nominated Christian "Ian" Sia as his vice mayoralty candidate, who lost to former congressman Dodot Jaworski.

Pasig vice mayoral election
Party	Candidate	Votes	%
Aksyon	Robert "Dodot" Jaworski	205,250	55.62%
PDDS	Mario "Jun-Jun" Concepcion	87,716	23.77%
PPP	Christian "Ian" Sia	76,028	20.60%
Total votes		368,994	100.00
Aksyon gain from PRP			

=== District representative ===
Incumbent congressman Roman Romulo defended his seat against former congressman Ricky Eusebio.

2022 Philippine House of Representatives election in Pasig's Lone District
Party	Candidate	Votes	%
Independent	Roman Romulo (Incumbent)	304,157	83.89%
Nacionalista	Ricky Eusebio	54,431	15.01%
Independent	Rex Maliuanag	3,977	1.10%
Total votes		362,565	100.00
Independent hold			

=== City Council ===
Party or alliance		Votes	%	Seats
Giting ng Pasig	Nationalist People's Coalition	612,131	32.73	8
Giting ng Pasig	Aksyon Demokratiko	269,790	14.42	2
Giting ng Pasig	Total	881,921	47.15	10
Team Pasigueño	Nacionalista Party	187,622	10.03	1
Team Pasigueño	People's Reform Party	100,482	5.37	0
Team Pasigueño	Progressive Movement for the Devolution of Initiatives	95,037	5.08	0
Team Pasigueño	Pederalismo ng Dugong Dakilang Samahan	77,982	4.17	1
Team Pasigueño	Partido Demokratiko Pilipino-Lakas ng Bayan	26,781	1.43	0
Team Pasigueño	Total	487,904	26.08	2
Team Independent	Partido Demokratiko Pilipino-Lakas ng Bayan	40,584	2.17	0
Team Independent	Independent	124,657	6.66	0
Team Independent	Total	165,241	8.83	0
Labor Party Philippines		32,041	1.71	0
Kilusang Bagong Lipunan		27,896	1.49	0
Partido Demokratiko Pilipino-Lakas ng Bayan		22,664	1.21	0
Nacionalista Party		19,849	1.06	0
Samahang Kaagapay ng Agilang Pilipino		14,183	0.76	0
Progressive Movement for the Devolution of Initiatives		4,285	0.23	0
Independent		214,474	11.47	0
Ex-officio seats				2
Total		1,870,458	100.00	14

==== 1st District ====
Pasig Council Election – 1st District
Party	Candidate	Votes	%
NPC	Kiko Rustia	80,136	20.58
NPC	Simon Romulo Tantoco	74,384	19.10
NPC	Pao Santiago	61,789	15.87
NPC	Volta Delos Santos	51,745	13.29
NPC	Eric Gonzales	50,316	12.92
PDDS	Reggie Balderrama (Incumbent)	49,297	12.66
PROMDI	Jana De Leon	49,029	12.59
Independent	Dottie Brown	48,054	12.34
Aksyon	Paul Senogat	36,890	9.47
PRP	Bobot Guevarra	28,169	7.23
Independent	Ron Angeles	27,654	7.10
Independent	Angelica Angeles	26,835	6.89
PDP–Laban	Migs Caruncho Trinidad	26,781	6.88
Nacionalista	Jessie Gaviola	25,906	6.65
Independent	Bien Raymundo Legaspi	20,396	5.24
Nacionalista	Rene Lipana	19,849	5.10
Independent	Tristan "Tantan" Reyes	17,697	4.54
PDP–Laban	Andy Cheng	16,270	4.18
Independent	Benjie Javier	15,666	4.02
Samahang Kaagapay ng Agilang Pilipino	Rey De Jesus	14,183	3.64
PDP–Laban	Gary Sta. Ana	6,394	1.64
PROMDI	Ram Cruz	4,285	1.10
Total votes		751,725	100.00

Party or alliance		Votes	%	Seats
Giting ng Pasig	Nationalist People's Coalition	318,370	42.35	5
Giting ng Pasig	Aksyon Demokratiko	36,890	4.91	0
Giting ng Pasig	Total	355,260	47.26	5
Team Pasigueño	Pederalismo ng Dugong Dakilang Samahan	49,297	6.56	1
Team Pasigueño	Progressive Movement for the Devolution of Initiatives	49,029	6.52	0
Team Pasigueño	People's Reform Party	28,169	3.75	0
Team Pasigueño	Partido Demokratiko Pilipino-Lakas ng Bayan	26,781	3.56	0
Team Pasigueño	Nacionalista Party	25,906	3.45	0
Team Pasigueño	Total	179,182	23.84	1
Independent under Team Independent		27,654	3.68	0
Partido Demokratiko Pilipino-Lakas ng Bayan		22,664	3.01	0
Nacionalista Party		19,849	2.64	0
Samahang Kaagapay ng Agilang Pilipino		14,183	1.89	0
Progressive Movement for the Devolution of Initiatives		4,285	0.57	0
Independent		128,648	17.11	0
Total		751,725	100.00	6

==== 2nd District ====
Pasig Council Election – 2nd District
Party	Candidate	Votes	%
Aksyon	Angelu De Leon	138,427	12.37
NPC	Corie Raymundo (Incumbent)	120,977	10.81
Nacionalista	Syvel Asilo	99,159	8.86
NPC	Buboy Agustin	97,218	8.69
Aksyon	Quin Cruz	94,473	8.44
NPC	Maro Martires	75,566	6.75
PRP	Apple Benito	72,313	6.46
Nacionalista	Steve De Asis	62,557	5.59
Independent	Warren Inocencio	51,717	4.62
PROMDI	Kaye Dela Cruz	46,008	4.11
Independent	Robin Salandanan	45,286	4.04
PDP–Laban	Ryan Enriquez	40,584	3.62
PDDS	Charmie Benavides	28,685	2.56
WPP	Jay Eusebio	27,127	2.42
Independent	Bobby Hapin	16,980	1.51
KBL	Mike Romualdez	16,264	1.45
Independent	Isidro "Taboy" Mariano	15,165	1.35
WPP	Grace Santa Ana	15,061	1.34
KBL	Jeff Pastor	11,632	1.03
Independent	Allan Tan Sy	9,248	0.82
Independent	Dodoy Pasamante	7,469	0.66
Independent	Ranz Banzil	6,008	0.53
Independent	Pablo Cantoria	5,568	0.49
Independent	Cesar Pelayo	4,641	0.41
Independent	Rebrando Hernandez	4,453	0.39
Independent	Eduardo Manaois	3,297	0.29
Independent	Alberto Vidayo	2,850	0.25
Total votes		1,118,733	100.00

Party or alliance		Votes	%	Seats
Giting ng Pasig	Nationalist People's Coalition	293,761	26.26	3
Giting ng Pasig	Aksyon Demokratiko	232,900	20.82	2
Giting ng Pasig	Total	526,661	47.08	5
Team Pasigueño	Nacionalista Party	161,716	14.46	1
Team Pasigueño	People's Reform Party	72,313	6.46	0
Team Pasigueño	Progressive Movement for the Devolution of Initiatives	46,008	4.11	0
Team Pasigueño	Pederalismo ng Dugong Dakilang Samahan	28,685	2.56	0
Team Pasigueño	Total	308,722	27.60	1
Team Independent	Partido Demokratiko Pilipino-Lakas ng Bayan	40,584	3.63	0
Team Independent	Independent	97,003	8.67	0
Team Independent	Total	137,587	12.30	0
Labor Party Philippines		32,041	2.86	0
Kilusang Bagong Lipunan		27,896	2.49	0
Independent		85,826	7.67	0
Total		1,118,733	100.00	6
