= Giting ng Pasig =

Filipino political party based in Pasig

- Leader: Vico Sotto
- Founder: Vico Sotto
- Founded: July 1, 2021
- Headquarters: Pasig
- Ideology: Localism; Progressivism
- Political position: Centre to centre-left
- National affiliation: Aksyon (2021–2022); NPC (since 2021); AKAY (since 2024); Akbayan (since 2024); PDP (since 2024)
- Colors: Blue
- Slogan: "Iba na Ngayon!" (It's Different Now!)
- Slogan in Filipino: Iba na Ngayon!
- Pasig City Council: 12 / 12
- House of Representatives (Pasig seat only): 1 / 1

Website
- Giting ng Pasig
- Politics of the Philippines; Political parties; Elections; A: Includes mayoral, vice mayoral, and some candidates for councilors B: Includes the congressional candidate and some candidates for councilors C: Includes only some candidates for councilors

The Giting ng Pasig (literally meaning "Bravery of Pasig" or "Valor of Pasig") is a local political organization based in Pasig, Philippines. The group has made a name for itself by promoting progressive policies and advocating for genuine change within the city.

== History ==
Giting ng Pasig was launched on July 1, 2021, as a local alliance for Vico Sotto's re-election bid in May 2022 elections. The party was then affiliated under Aksyon Demokratiko, who distanced themselves from national politics to focus for their local duties. He then choose former Pasig Congressman Dodot Jaworski to be his running-mate. Sotto was challenged by then-incumbent Vice Mayor Iyo Bernardo, who is known for being an ally of Bobby Eusebio, which Sotto defeated in 2019. The coalition emerged as victorious, with Sotto and Jaworski's victory, with 10 councilors seated including actress Angelu de Leon.

In 2025 elections, the whole slate of Giting ng Pasig led by incumbent Mayor Vico Sotto won. They presented their victory as principles and political platforms will prevail.

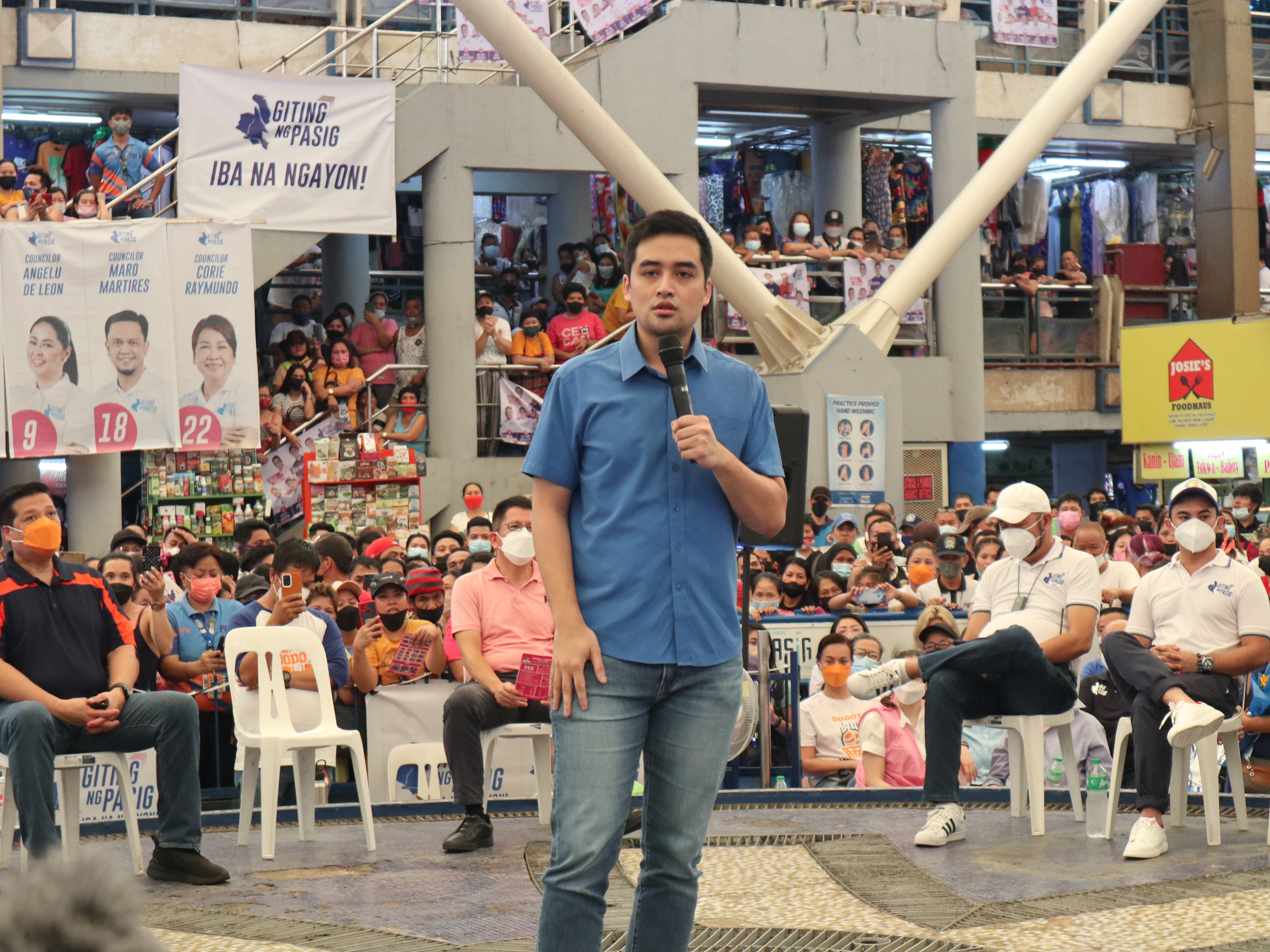
Pasig Mayor Vico Sotto speaking at the Giting ng Pasig proclamation rally at Pasig Mega Market on March 25, 2022.

== Electoral performance ==
=== Mayoral and Vice Mayoral elections ===
Year	Mayoral election				Vice mayoral election			
Year	Candidate	Votes	Vote share	Result	Candidate	Votes	Vote share	Result
2022	Vico Sotto (Note: Candidates are either affiliated with the Aksyon Demokratiko (Aksyon) or Nationalist People's Coalition (NPC).)	335,851	88.04%	Won	Dodot Jaworski	205,250	55.62%	Won
2025	Vico Sotto	351,392	92.09%	Won	Dodot Jaworski	290,237	78.84%	Won

=== Legislative elections ===
City Council			House of Representatives		
Year	Seats won	Result	Year	Seats won	Result
2022	10 / 12	Won	2022 (Note: Ran as Independent)	1 / 1	Joined Majority
2025	12 / 12	Won	2025	1 / 1	Joined Majority

== Notable members ==
=== Mayor and Vice Mayor ===
- Vico Sotto (Mayor of City of Pasig; founder)
- Robert "Dodot" Jaworski Jr. (Vice Mayor of City of Pasig; founding member)

=== National Legislators ===
- Roman Romulo (Pasig's At-large Representative)

=== Councilors ===
- Angelu de Leon (Actress; Councilor at Pasig's 2nd district)
