= Robert Jaworski Jr. =

Filipino politician and basketball player

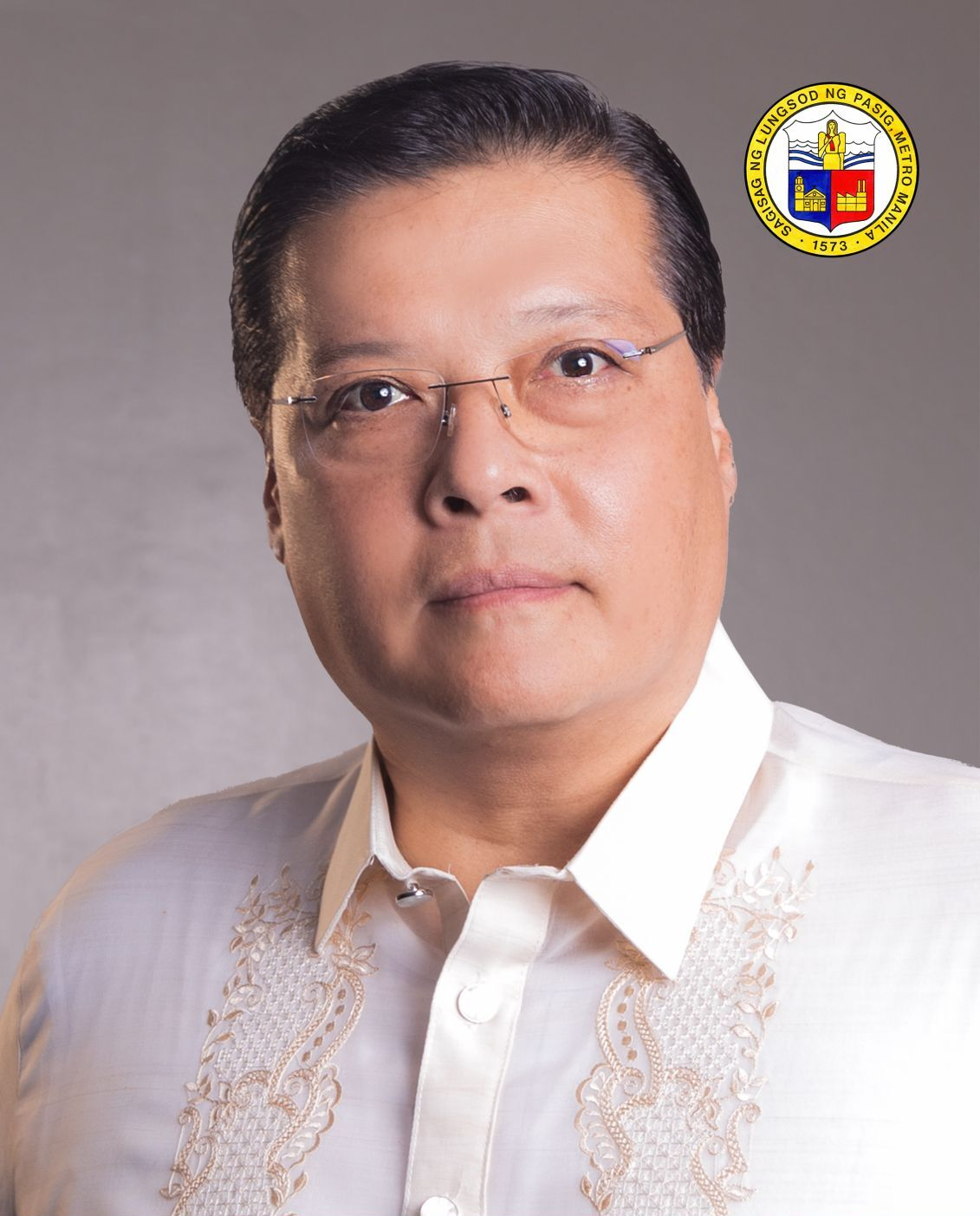
- Official portrait, 2025

8th Vice Mayor of Pasig
- Incumbent
- Assumed office June 30, 2022
- Mayor: Vico Sotto
- Preceded by: Iyo Bernardo

Member of the Philippine House of Representatives from Pasig at-large
- In office June 30, 2004 – June 30, 2007
- Preceded by: Noel Cariño
- Succeeded by: Roman Romulo

Member of the San Juan Municipal Council
- In office June 30, 1995 – June 30, 1998

Personal details
- Born: Robert Vincent Jude Bautista Jaworski Jr. October 14, 1971 (age 55) Quezon City, Philippines
- Party: Independent (2024–present); Giting ng Pasig (local party; 2021–present)
- Other political affiliations: Aksyon (2021–2024); Lakas (2004–2021); PMP (1995–2004)
- Spouse: Mikee Cojuangco (m. 1999)
- Relations: Ramon Revilla Sr. (grandfather)
- Children: 3 (including Robbie)
- Parents: Robert Jaworski (father); Evelyn Bautista (mother)
- Education: Ateneo de Manila University
- Nickname: Dodot (Note: The nickname was sometimes misspelled as Dudut.)
- Basketball career

Personal information
- Listed height: 6 ft 2 in (1.88 m)
- Listed weight: 180 lb (82 kg)

Career information
- High school: Brent International School (Pasig)
- College: Ateneo
- PBA draft: 1995: 2nd round, 10th overall pick
- Drafted by: Ginebra San Miguel
- Playing career: 1995–1998
- Number: 52

Career history
- 1995–1998: Ginebra San Miguel / Gordon's Gin Boars

Career highlights
- PBA champion (1997 Commissioner's)

Robert Vincent Jude "Dodot" Bautista Jaworski Jr. (born October 14, 1971) is a Filipino politician, businessman, and former professional basketball player currently serving as the vice mayor of Pasig since 2022. He previously served as the Representative of Pasig's lone district from 2004 to 2007 and was a councilor of San Juan, Metro Manila from 1995 to 1998.

Jaworski played for Ginebra/Gordon's franchise of the Philippine Basketball Association (PBA) from 1996 to 1998. At Ginebra, he was teammates with his father, player-coach Robert Jaworski Sr. and won a PBA championship: the 1997 Commissioner's Cup.

== Basketball career ==
Jaworski was drafted by PBA team Ginebra San Miguel in 1995 to join his father, then playing coach Robert Jaworski Sr. Together, they won one championship together in 1997 PBA Commissioner's Cup playing as the Gordon's Gin Boars.

He played for the Ginebra San Miguel from 1995 to 1998 being only the father-and-son tandem of Philippine basketball. He retired in 1999 at the age of 28, together with his father.

== Political career ==
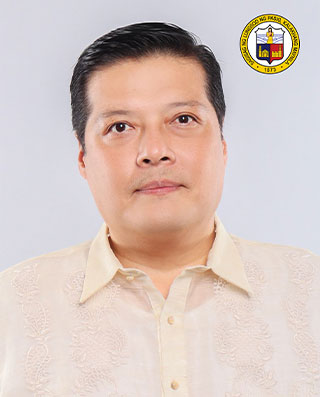
Official portrait, 2022

Jaworski began his political career as a councilor in the Municipality of San Juan in 1995, at the age of 23 under PMP. In 1998, he served as Chief of Staff at the office of his father, Senator Jaworski, for six years.

In 2004, Jaworski was elected as congressman of the at-large district of Pasig, defeating then-incumbent congressman Noel "Toti" Cariño, who would later become his party mate in 2006. In 2006, he filed a congressional resolution to investigate the alleged hurried demolition of shanty settlements ordered by Mayor Vicente Eusebio in connection with the shabu market raid in Mapayapa Compound, Barangay Santo Tomas.

He ran for Mayor of Pasig in 2007 under the political party called Partido Pasigueño, but lost to the incumbent Mayor's son, 2nd district councilor Bobby Eusebio. The early part of the election vote tally showed Jaworski leading, but was overtaken by Eusebio. Jaworski later promised to file a protest against Eusebio.

During his political hiatus, Jaworski focused on business, leading at least five firms in the hospitality, education and construction sectors.

On September 23, 2021, Jaworski announced that he would be running for vice mayor of Pasig in 2022. He was invited as the running mate of Mayor Vico Sotto under Aksyon Demokratiko. He won the vice mayoralty race in a landslide victory, defeating his two opponents; Sotto was also successfully re-elected as mayor. Jaworski, alongside Sotto, was re-elected in 2025.

== Personal life ==
Jaworski is the son of Robert Jaworski, a former Philippine Basketball Association player and former Senator, and Evelyn Bautista, the daughter of actor and another former Senator Ramon Revilla Sr. He married Mikee Cojuangco on July 30, 1999. They first met during a group date in 1997. Together, they have three sons: Robert Vincent Anthony III (Robbie), Rafael Joseph (Raf) and Renzo.

=== Assassination attempt ===
On December 12, 2006, Jaworski, along with his brother Ryan and their driver, escaped injury when their Toyota Innova van exploded along C-5 Road in Ugong, Pasig. Jaworski, who was running for mayor in the 2007 elections, believed the incident was politically motivated, citing death threats he received due to the congressional investigation he launched into the Mapayapa shabu market allegedly linked to Pasig mayor Vicente Eusebio. At the time, Eusebio's son, Bobby Eusebio, was also running for mayor.

A parallel investigation was launched by the Eastern Police District (EPD) and the National Bureau of Investigation. Initial reports suggested that the van had exploded due to faulty electrical wiring, which Jaworski did not believe. Rumors also emerged suggesting that he had gone into hiding and that the explosion was staged by his camp; Jaworski publicly denied both claims. On December 14, the EPD confirmed that an improvised explosive device had been planted under the chassis of their van. Following the incident, Jaworski has since increased his security detail and underwent firearms training.

On December 18, the EPD further confirmed that the improvised explosive device used nitroglycerin, contrary to earlier reports that RDX was used. No suspects were named, and no further updates on the investigation were given since then.

== PBA career statistics ==
Legend
GP	Games played	MPG	Minutes per game
FG%	Field-goal percentage	3P%	3-point field-goal percentage	FT%	Free-throw percentage
RPG	Rebounds per game	APG	Assists per game	SPG	Steals per game
BPG	Blocks per game	PPG	Points per game	**Bold**	Career high

=== Season-by-season averages ===
Year	Team	GP	MPG	FG%	3P%	FT%	RPG	APG	SPG	BPG	PPG
1996	Ginebra	11	7.5	.188	.200	.000	.7	.5	.1	.0	.8
1997	Gordon's	**58**	10.3	**.357**	**.257**	**.688**	1.0	.5	.1	.0	**2.4**
1998	Ginebra	32	**13.6**	.237	.241	.636	**1.7**	**.6**	**.4**	**.1**	2.3
Career		101	11.0	.290	.250	.667	1.2	.5	.2	.0	2.2

== Notes ==
House of Representatives of the Philippines
Preceded by Noel Cariño	Representative, Lone District of Pasig; 2004–2007	Succeeded by Roman Romulo
Political offices
Preceded by Iyo Bernardo	Vice Mayor of Pasig; 2022–present	Incumbent
