= Curlee and Sarah Discaya =

Filipino businesspeople (born 1975 and 1976)

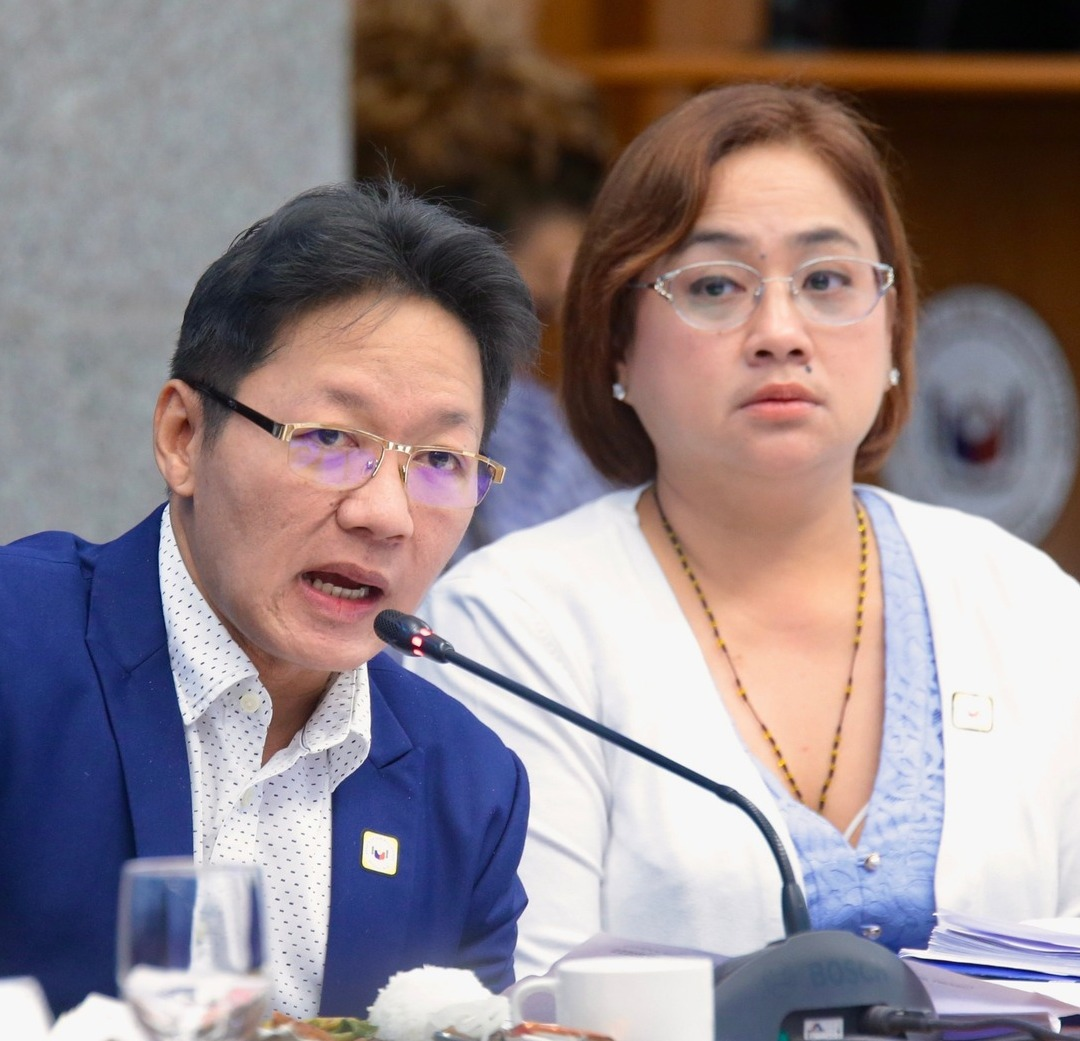
- Curlee (left) and Sarah Discaya (right) in 2025
- Born: Pacifico Felizario Discaya II; May 15, 1975 (age 51); Culasi, Antique, Philippines Cezarah Rowena Cruz; November 10, 1976 (age 49); London, England
- Citizenship: Philippines (both); United Kingdom (Sarah)
- Education: Pasig Catholic College
- Occupations: Businesspeople; politicians
- Known for: Owners and executives of St. Gerrard Construction Corporation; 2025 Pasig mayoral candidate (Sarah)
- Political party: Pinoy Ako (Curlee); Unyon ng mga Gabay ng Bayan (Sarah); Partido Federal ng Pilipinas (both)
- Children: 4

Pacifico "Curlee" Felizario Discaya II (born May 15, 1975) and Cezarah Rowena "Sarah" Cruz Discaya (née Juan Cruz; born November 10, 1976) are Filipino businesspeople and politicians. The married couple are associated with the construction firms Alpha and Omega, St. Timothy Construction and St. Gerrard Construction, which were labeled as among the top proprietors for various flood control projects and school infrastructure projects under Rodrigo Duterte and Bongbong Marcos administrations, in addition to six other construction firms.

Sarah Discaya was also a mayoral candidate in the 2025 Pasig local elections, where she lost via landslide to incumbent mayor Vico Sotto.

== Early lives and education ==
=== Sarah Discaya ===
Sarah Discaya was born on November 10, 1976, in London, England. Her parents are both overseas Filipino workers; her mother worked as a chambermaid, while her father was a waiter. In a 2025 Senate inquiry, Discaya described her Filipino father as being a "contractor before for LGU". She professed that she lived a middle-class life in the United Kingdom.

A Vera Files column claimed that Discaya was born out of wedlock to a Filipino-British father; the "Cruz" in Sarah Discaya's name was her Filipino stepfather's surname. The same column claimed that Liza is her maternal half-sister.

Discaya accomplished her primary and secondary education in London then moved to the Philippines to pursue tertiary education. She pursued a business administration degree at the La Consolacion College Pasig for two years before earning her Bachelor of Science in Business Administration major in Management of Service Institution degree at the Pasig Catholic College. She later worked as a dental clinic receptionist, then as an orthodontic nurse as well as doing a brief stint in the entertainment industry, working alongside Nora Aunor before being asked to stop by her mother.

=== Curlee Discaya ===
Pacifico "Curlee" Discaya II was born on May 15, 1975. Curlee is one of two twins both named Pacifico Discaya. According to Sarah Discaya from the Korina Interviews interview in January 2024, Pacifico "Butch" Discaya I died in 2006 in a subdivision dispute. He spent time in the church during his childhood doing custodial work to support his studies. He says he is the only college graduate in his immediate family, studying at the Pasig Catholic College where he met his eventual wife Sarah.

Curlee Discaya once considered priesthood, but eventually became a contractor who works with the government due to financial and pragmatic reasons.

== Business careers ==
Curlee and Sarah Discaya are noted for their involvement in the construction industry.

The Discayas own or had owned the following companies (all of which have had their contractor licenses revoked by September 1, 2025):

Name of company	Date established	Authorized managing officer	Authorized representative	Comments	Ref(s).
Alpha and Omega General Contractor and Development Corporation	May 9, 2014	Curlee Discaya	Sarah Discaya		
St. Timothy Construction Corporation	July 4, 2014		Ma. Roma Angeline Rimado		
St. Matthew General Contractor & Development Corporation	November 9, 2015	Kristine Mae M. Tumpalan	Darryl Mark Pesigan		
St. Gerrard Construction General Contractor and Development Corporation	2003; November 12, 2015	Curlee Discaya	Curlee Discaya	Suspended in August 2015 for one year Suspended in January 2020 for one year	
Great Pacific Builders and General Contractor	June 19, 2018	Fairybel B. Co; Mary Joy A. Balangcad			
Amethyst Horizon Builders and General Contractor & Dev’t Corp.	June 5, 2020	Rochelle R. Campos		Owned by Pesigan family	
Elite General Contractor and Development Corporation	June 10, 2020	Maritoni P. Melegrito		Owned by Pesigan family	
YPR General Contractor and Construction Supply		Florentino D. Pesigan		Owned by Pesigan family	
Way Maker General Contractor OPC	April 21, 2021	Jazzie Ann S. Persia		Owned by Gerrard William Francisco Discaya	

All of these companies have listed addresses either in Barangay Bambang or Barangay Malinao, Pasig.

St. Gerrard Construction is a construction firm founded in 2003 and named after their eldest son, while Alpha & Omega was incorporated in May 2014. Both companies were awarded several large-scale infrastructure projects during President Rodrigo Duterte's administration and became two of the most prominent contractors of the period. They started engaging in flood control projects in 2016. They continued securing projects during the President Bongbong Marcos administration. From 2022 to 2025, the Discayas' companies bagged ₱31 billion worth of flood control projects.

The Discayas' companies were put onto spotlight when President Marcos flagged the top flood control contractors for possible irregularities soon after his 4th State of the Nation Address.

Apart from construction, Sarah Discaya has served as a local director for the Pasig branch of the Miss Universe Philippines pageant franchise since 2024. The organization's president, Shamcey Supsup-Lee, unsuccessfully ran for councilor of Pasig initially under Discaya's slate in the 2025 elections.

== Sarah and Curlee Discaya's 2025 electoral campaigns ==
In August 2024, Sarah Discaya joined the Partido Federal ng Pilipinas of President Bongbong Marcos in the lead up to the official filing period of certificate of candidacies (COCs) for the 2025 mid-term elections.

However, in October 2024, Discaya formally filed her COC for the 2025 Pasig mayoral election under the Unyon ng mga Gabay ng Bayan (UGB) party. Discaya stated that she was "provoked" by incumbent mayor Vico Sotto to run for mayor, alleging that her family had been subjected to defamation since Sotto became mayor in 2019. She further claimed that Sotto had hindered the operations of her business and attacked her family as a means of discrediting the Eusebio political clan. Meanwhile, Curlee Discaya ran as the second nominee of Pinoy AKO Party List, with Sarah's brother Christian Andrew J. Cruz positioned as its first nominee.

In response, Sotto claimed that St. Gerrard Construction Corporation had funded a social media misinformation campaign against his administration. He also raised a potential conflict of interest, noting that Discaya's company, St. Timothy, had entered into an agreement with the Commission on Elections (Comelec) for the 2025 midterm elections. Although St. Timothy later withdrew from the agreement, Discaya claimed that she had divested her shares in the company back in 2018. By January 28, 2025, Curlee Discaya filed a disqualification case against Sotto, which was later dismissed by Comelec's second division in March.

During the election campaign, Discaya promised a "government with a heart" and to transform Pasig into a "smart city". She also pledged to implement various infrastructure projects for education, health, transportation, firefighting, housing, and internet-connectivity.

Despite her heavily financed campaign, she lost by a wide margin, garnering only 29,591 votes against Sotto's 351,392.

Her campaign was marked by various controversies linked to blacklisting issues tied to her company and a heavy reliance on paid vloggers for campaign promotion. Discaya's possession of a British passport raised questions about her eligibility to run for office. Her legal counsel maintained, however, that she was qualified as a dual citizen by birth and had not subsequently acquired British citizenship.

=== Aftermath ===
Shortly after the flood control projects controversy arose in August 2025, Pasig mayor Vico Sotto brought attention to various interviews that Curlee and Sarah Discaya had with journalists Julius Babao and Korina Sanchez featuring the Discayas' "rags to riches" story released prior to March 28, 2025, the start of the official campaign period for the 2025 elections. Sotto alleged that the Discayas paid for the interview, which raised several discussion online on journalism ethics on social media. Some of the luxury vehicles featured in the interviews got seized by the Bureau of Customs and protesters defaced the headquarters of St. Gerrard due to corruption allegations.

== Personal lives ==
Curlee and Sarah Discaya are a married couple. The two first met as classmates at Pasig Catholic College. They had a civil ceremony in 2003 and later a church wedding in 2016. They have three sons and a daughter.

A September 2025 Vera Files column claimed that Sarah is the niece of former Pasig Mayor Vicente Eusebio, whose family administered the city from 1992 to 2019, as her mother is Eusebio's half-sister. In turn, she is also alleged as a first cousin of former Pasig Mayor Bobby Eusebio and former Pasig Representative Richard Eusebio. She had previously dismissed allegations of her family being related to the Eusebios before stating that it is a tactic by political opponents.

== Legal issues ==
=== Luxury car collection ===
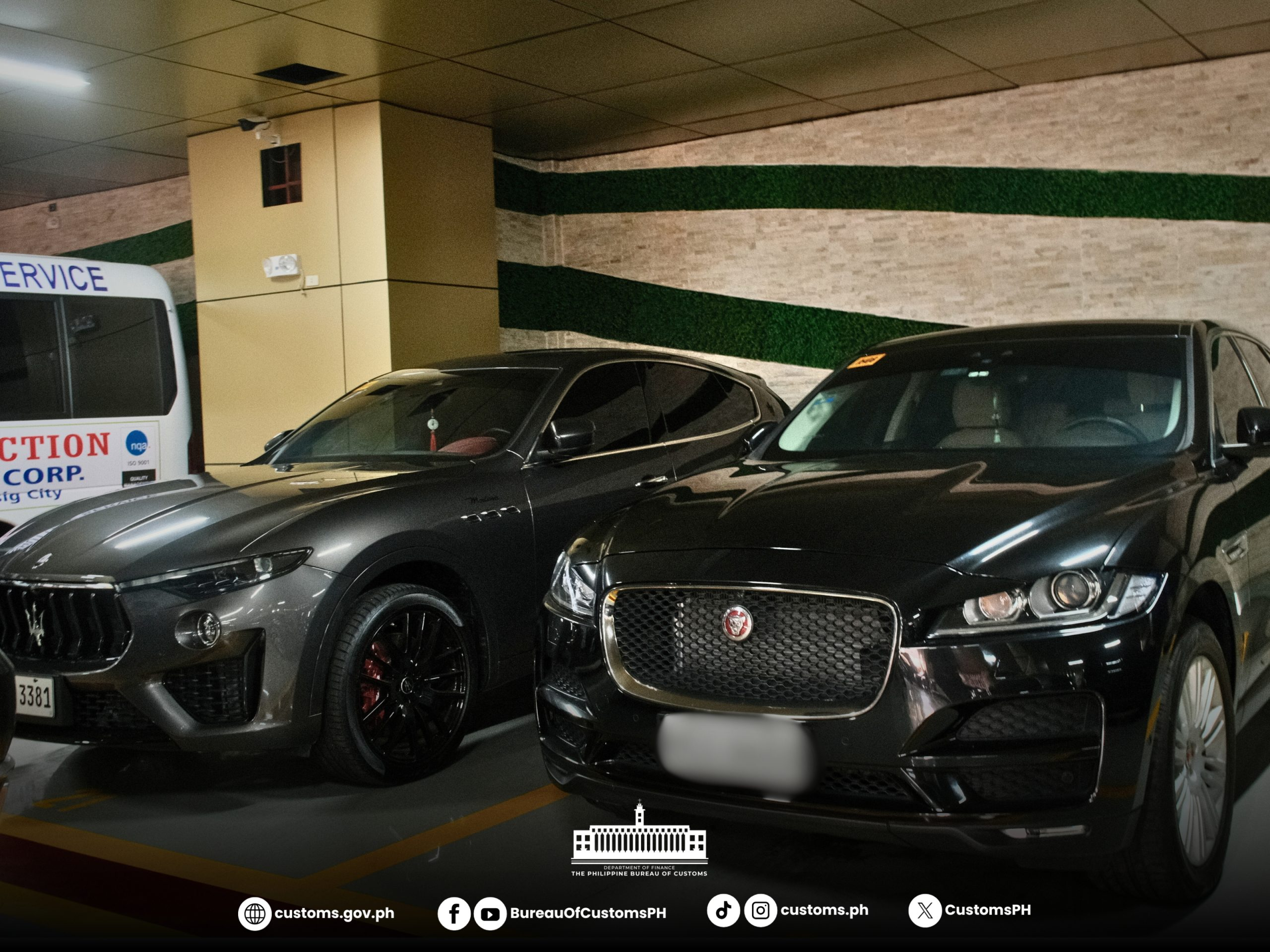
A Maserati Levante Modena 2022 and Jaguar F-Pace owned by the Discayas seized by the Bureau of Customs.

The couple has a collection of 40 luxury vehicles, which was featured in Julius Babao's interview in September 2024. The Bureau of Customs (BOC) announced on August 28, 2025 that it would launch an investigation into the collection to determine if appropriate fees were paid.

The BOC executed a search warrant on September 2, 2025 acquiring custody over 12 vehicles. By September 4, 16 vehicles were surrendered to the BOC by the Discayas.

The cars are being auctioned off to pay taxes owned under existing laws for forfeiture. One of the cars, a Rolls-Royce, sold for 29 million pesos at auction to a Baguio businessman after two previous auction attempts failed to attract bidders. Previously, a video of a news interview featuring the car with Sara went viral, where she stated she bought the Rolls-Royce because it came with a “free umbrella”.

=== Arrest of Sarah Discaya ===
On December 5, 2025, President Bongbong Marcos announced the pending arrest of Sarah Discaya as well as other officials because of a P100-million ghost flood control project in Davao Occidental. The Office of the Ombudsman confirmed this after the President spoke. Assistant Ombudsman Mico Clavano was quoted as saying:

"The Office of the Ombudsman finds probable cause to file criminal charges in connection with an alleged P96.5 million ghost project in Davao Occidental... We announce that criminal informations shall be filed before the regional trial court of Digos City against several officials of the DPWH Davao Occidental district engineering office and private individual owners of St. Timothy,"

Marcos claimed in an earlier video Discaya firm submitted falsified evidence of work progress on at least one flood project. Marcos also stated that "several public officials" were named in the legal complaint but did not name them.

On the same day, December 5, 2025, the Pasig City government orders the closure of over 9 firms owned by the Discayas due to their unpaid taxes, which reached over P1.1 billion.

On December 9, 2025 around 10 a.m., Sarah Discaya surrendered to NBI while the arrest warrant issuance is pending. She was accompanied by her attorney. The charges stem from a project that her company was paid for, and had claimed to be fully completed in 2022. The Criminal Investigation and Detection Group (CIDG) had found the entire project "non-existent" while doing an inspection in September 2025. She was formally charged on December 18, 2026 by the NBI and is being held in a detention facility in Muntinlupa, (Metro Manila area).

On January 13, 2026, Sarah Disaya and eight co-defendants, all employees of the Department of Public Works and Highways (DPWH) Davao Occidental District Engineering Office (DEO), were arraigned before the Lapu-Lapu City Regional Trial Court (RTC) Branch 27 in Cebu on charges relating to an alleged P96-million ghost project in Davao Occidental. All the defendants pled "not guilty" to graft and malversation charges.

=== Detention of Curlee Discaya ===
Beginning December 23, 2025, Curlee Discaya was held in the Philippine Senate while an arrest warrant is pending, along with three DPWH engineers, although Discaya has already been formally held in the Senate since September 18 of the same year after being cited for contempt. The four had requested a "holiday furlough" during Christmas, but the request was denied due to the risk of escape. As of April 2026, he is still being held in the Senate, although in March he was briefly allowed to leave to get an MRI for a "frozen shoulder".

== See also ==
- 2025 Pasig local elections
