= The Gift (2013 TV series) =

- Genre: Musical; Drama; Romance
- Developed by: Elmer L. Gatchalian
- Directed by: Mike Tuviera
- Creative director: Mac C. Alejandre
- Starring: Ogie Alcasid; Ara Mina
- Theme music composer: Ogie Alcasid
- Country of origin: Philippines
- Original languages: Filipino; English

Production
- Executive producer: Roselle Lorenzo
- Production locations: Metro Manila, Philippines
- Running time: 30-45 minutes

Original release
- Network: TV5

The Gift is a shelved Philippine drama series supposed to be broadcast by TV5 starring Ogie Alcasid and Ara Mina. It was set to premiere on October 14, 2013, on the network's primetime block. The crew were able to film for two weeks before being halted. According to Alcasid, the reason it was shelved was because TV5 was hoping to air more comedic shows at the time.

== Cast ==
- Ogie Alcasid as Nathan
- Ara Mina as Theresa
- Arci Muñoz as Ella
- Joshen Bernardo as Eli
- Candy Pangilinan as Dorina
- Leo Martinez as Manong Aselo

Special participation of Malak So as Elay
