= Pasig Catholic College =

Roman Catholic college in Pasig, Philippines

- Kolehiyong Katoliko ng Pasig (Filipino); Dalubhasaang Katoliko ng Pasig

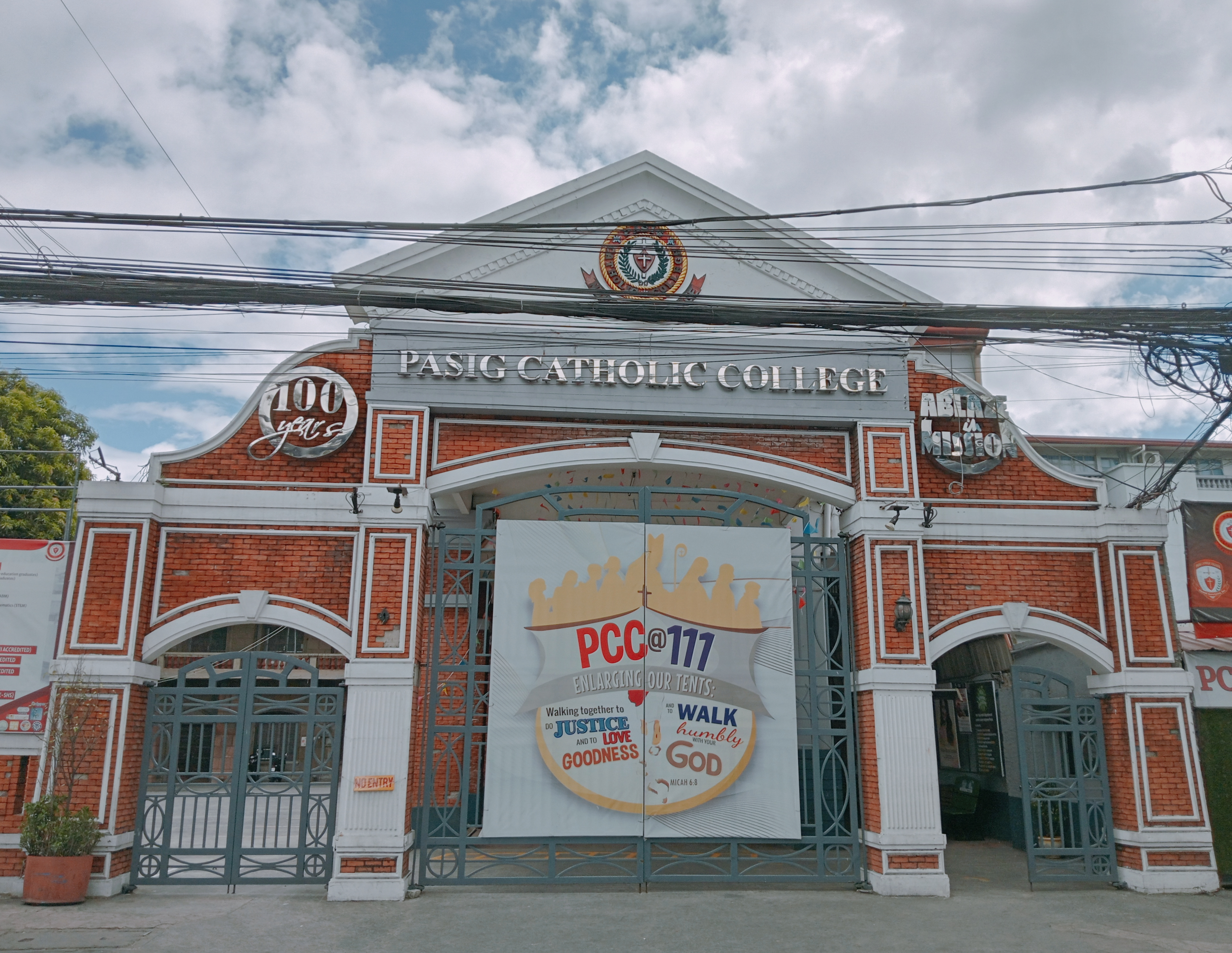
- Gate and facade

Location
- Pasig, Metro Manila; Philippines
- Coordinates: 14°33′34″N 121°04′37″E

Information
- Type: Private, Catholic, Diocesan, Co-educational Basic and Higher education institution
- Motto: Noblesse Oblige (French: Nobility Obligates)
- Religious affiliation: Roman Catholic
- Patron saint: Immaculate Conception
- Established: 1913
- Founder: Fr. Pierre Cornelis De Brouwer, CICM
- Oversight: Pasig Diocesan School System
- President: Rev. Fr. Daniel L. Estacio
- Chairman: Most Rev. Mylo Hubert C. Vergara D.D.
- Dean: Jennifer Apolinario
- Campus type: Main campus: Malinao, Pasig; College campus: Caniogan, Pasig
- Colors: Red and White
- Mascot: The Crusader
- Nickname: PCCian, Crusaders
- Accreditation: PAASCU Accredited Level 3 (Grade School); PAASCU Accredited Level 3 (High School)
- Newspaper: The Crusader/The Herald
- Website: www.pasigcatholic.edu.ph

Pasig Catholic College (Filipino: Kolehiyong Katoliko ng Pasig), also referred to as PCC, is a private Catholic coeducational basic and higher education institution located in Pasig, Philippines and was founded by CICM fathers in 1913. It is considered as the central catholic educational institution and the cathedral school of the Diocese of Pasig.

PCC, in the heart of Pasig in Malinao, was founded in 1913 as "Escuela Catolica" by Rev. Pierre Cornelis De Brouwer, CICM, Its first functional lone building was the "Bahay Paaralan" built in 1931. PCC was then an exclusive school for boys. It became a coeducational institution and is considered the largest catholic school in the Diocese of Pasig.

The College was granted Level 3 accreditation by the Philippine Accrediting Association of Schools, Colleges and Universities or PAASCU in the Elementary department, High School Department while the College Department was granted Level 2 including the College of Secondary Education, College of Elementary Education, and College of Business Administration.

== History ==
It was founded in 1901 as a small school managed by the CICM Fathers headed by Fr. Pierre Cornelis De Brouwer, CICM inside the "convento" (convent) of the Immaculate Conception Parish (now the Immaculate Conception Cathedral in Pasig). It is the first school in Pasig.

During the Japanese occupation in 1942-1945, the classrooms and corridors were used by the Japanese to store garrisons, during this time as well a bomb was implanted under the main campus before.

In 1951, the secondary and tertiary levels of education were established. The former were exclusively for boys while the latter was coeducational.

The old college building was destroyed because of the earthquake with an estimated magnitude of 7.7 that happened in 1990.

In 1995, a coeducational program was initially introduced in Grades 1 and 2 and first and second year in High School.

On June 26, 2006, The Philippine Marketing Awards Institute, The Asian Institute of Marketing and Entrepreneurship, and The Marketing Insights Magazine recognized and awarded Pasig Catholic College as the “Most Outstanding Catholic School” in Pasig.

== Accreditation and recognition ==
The Grade School Department was granted re-accreditation for five years during the PAASCU Formas Visit on February 7–8, 2005. On the other hand, the High School Department was granted re-accreditation for five years retroactive during the PAASCU visit on September 5–6, 2005. On June 26, 2006, The Philippine Marketing Awards Institute, The Asian Institute of Marketing and Entrepreneurship and the Marketing Insights Magazine recognized and awarded Pasig Catholic College as the "Most Outstanding Catholic School" in Pasig.

The College Department Underwent a Preliminary Visity by the PAASCU on September 4–5, 2006. The PAASCU team's visit focused on the college department's Education and Business Administration programs.

The PAASCU Consultancy visit for the College Department was held on August 8, 2008, focusing on the area of the faculty.

== Gallery ==
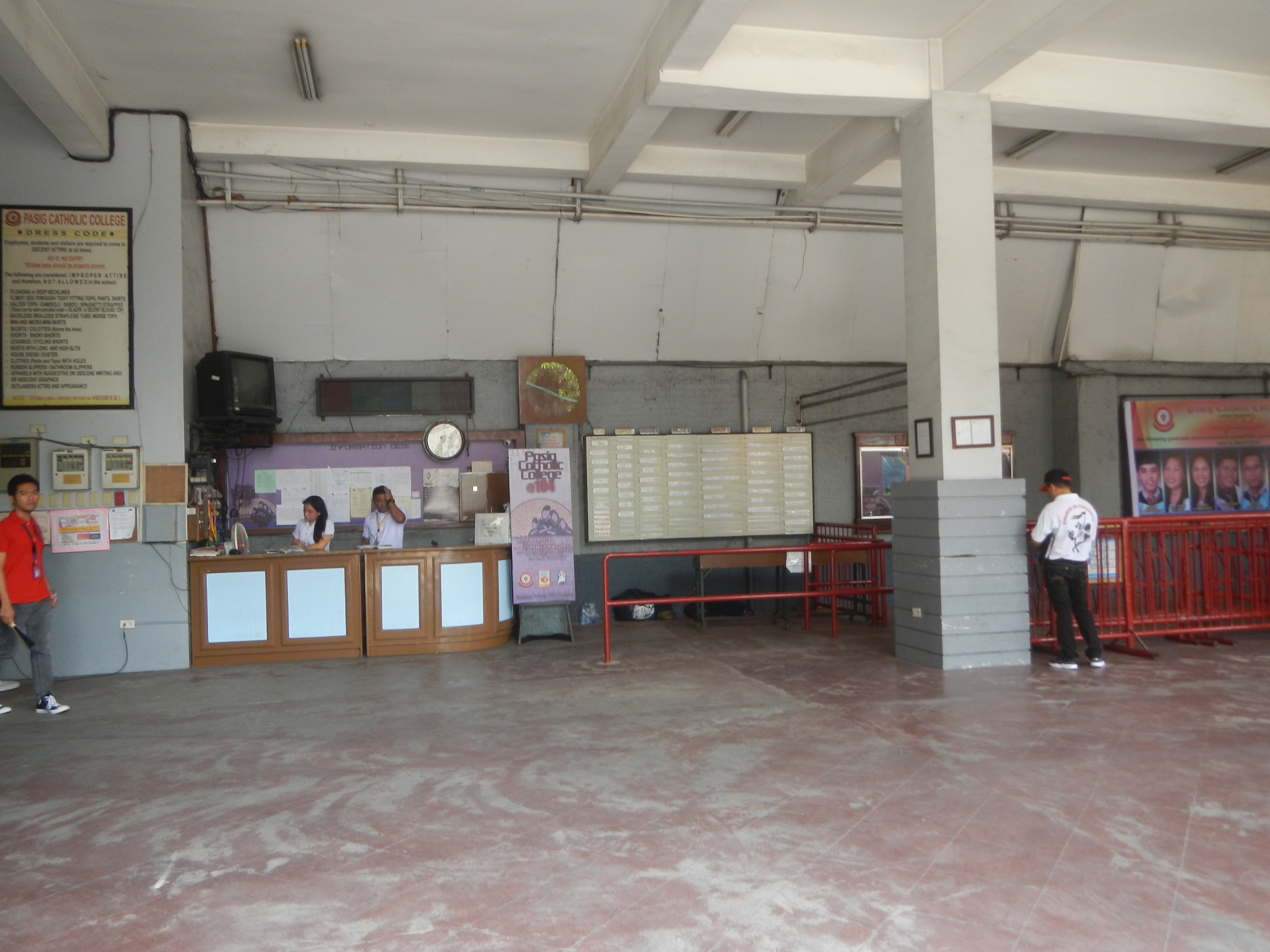
Entrance from Main Gate

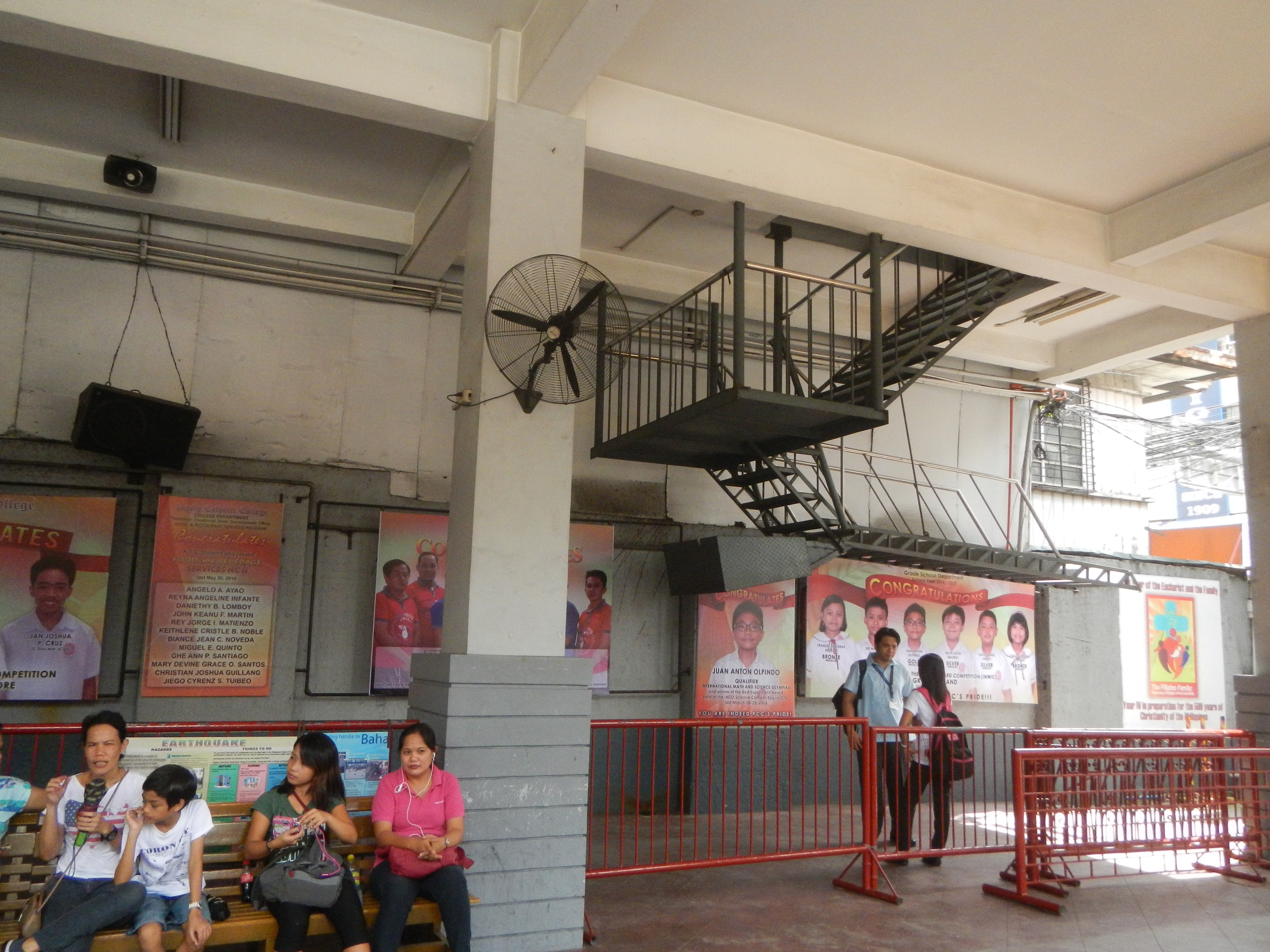
Entrance from Main Gate

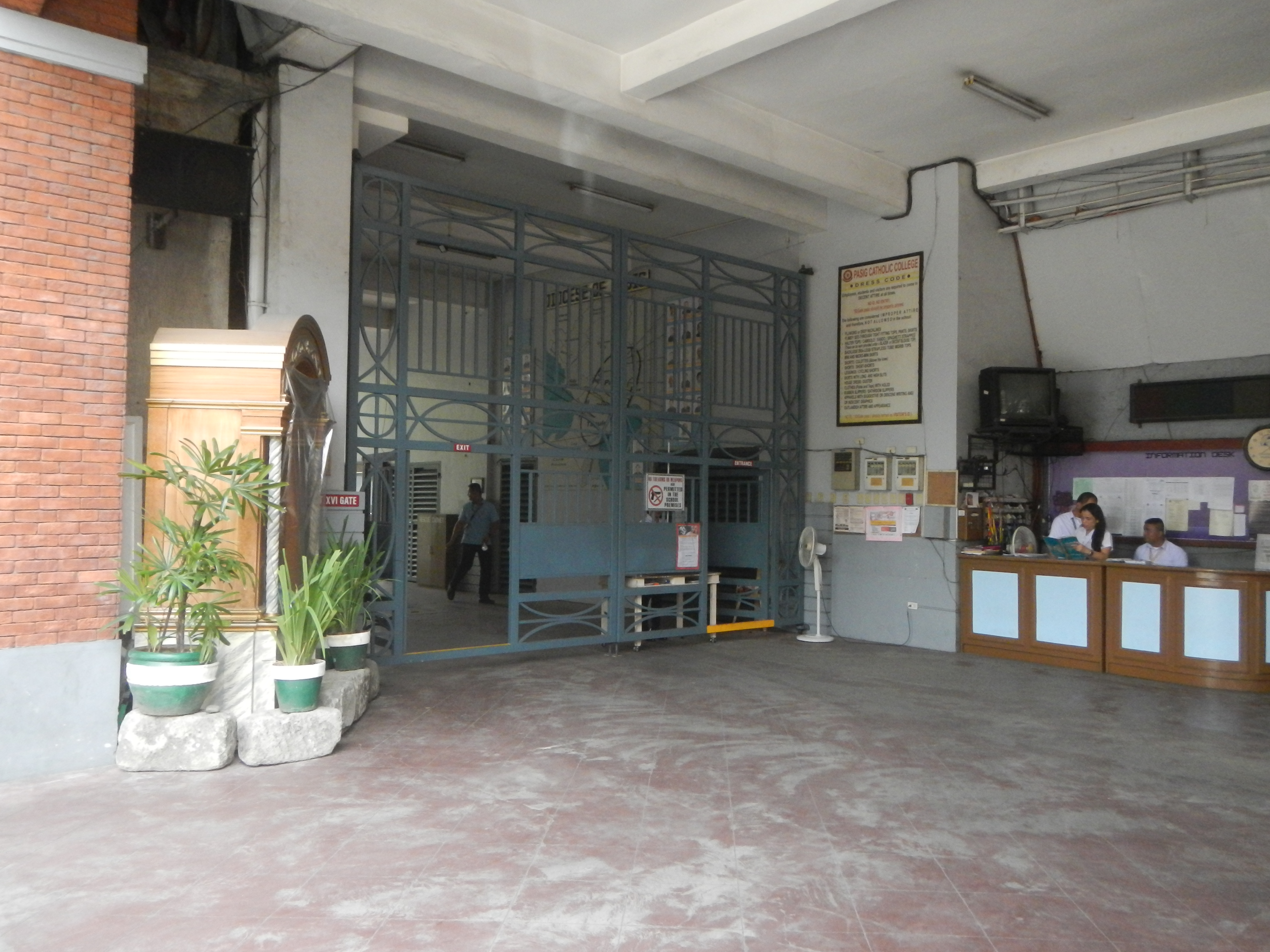

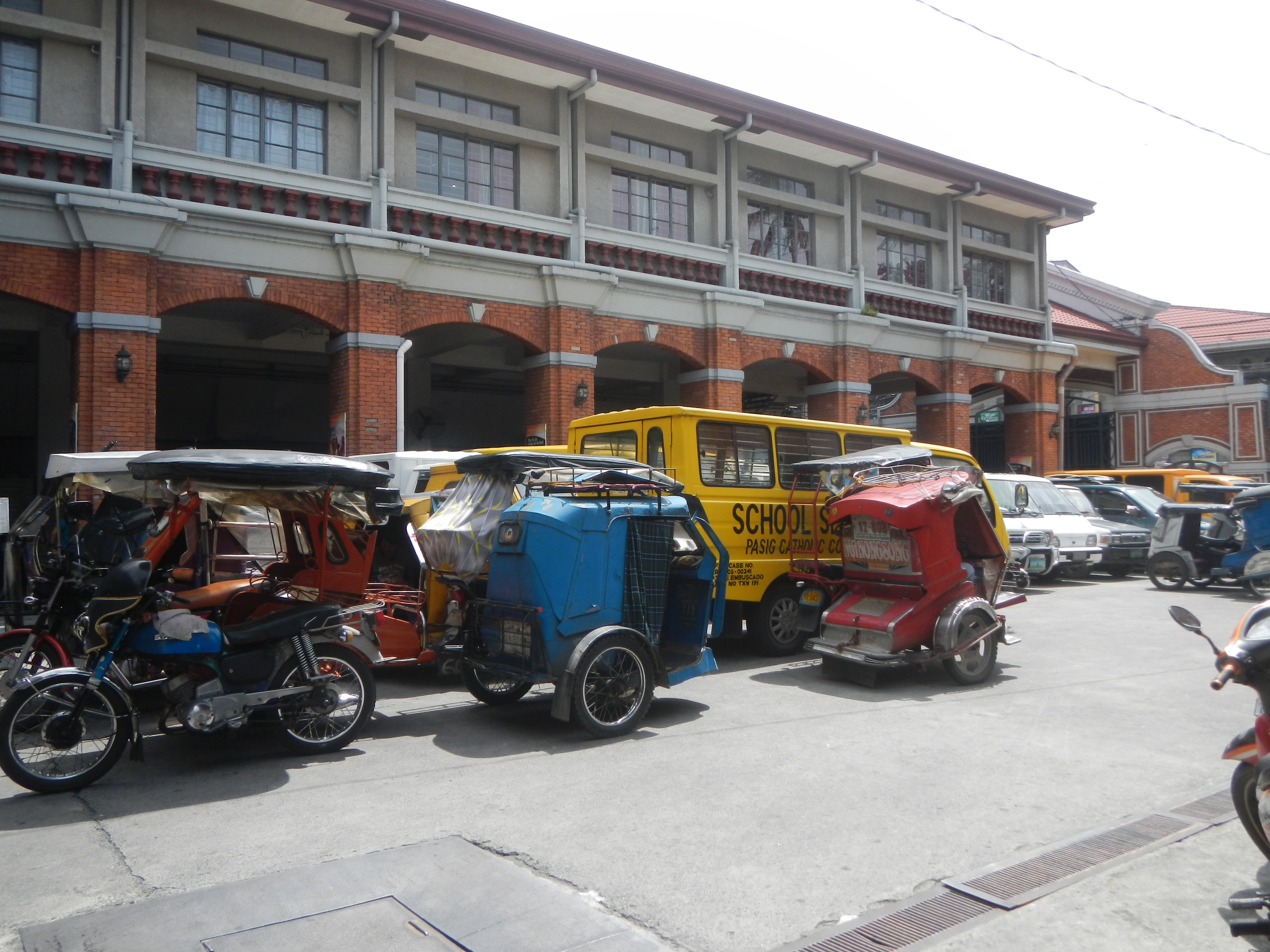

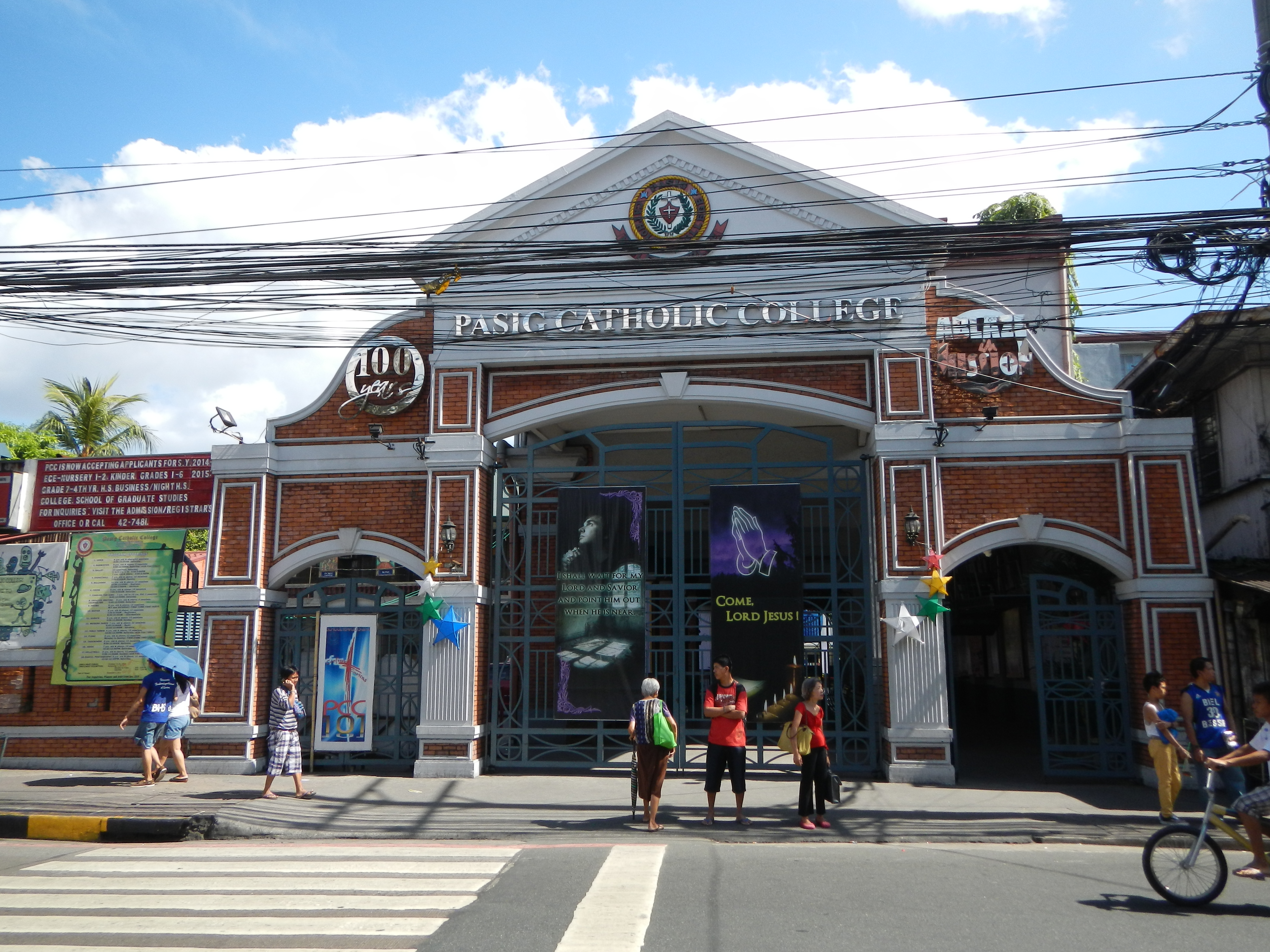
Front Facade

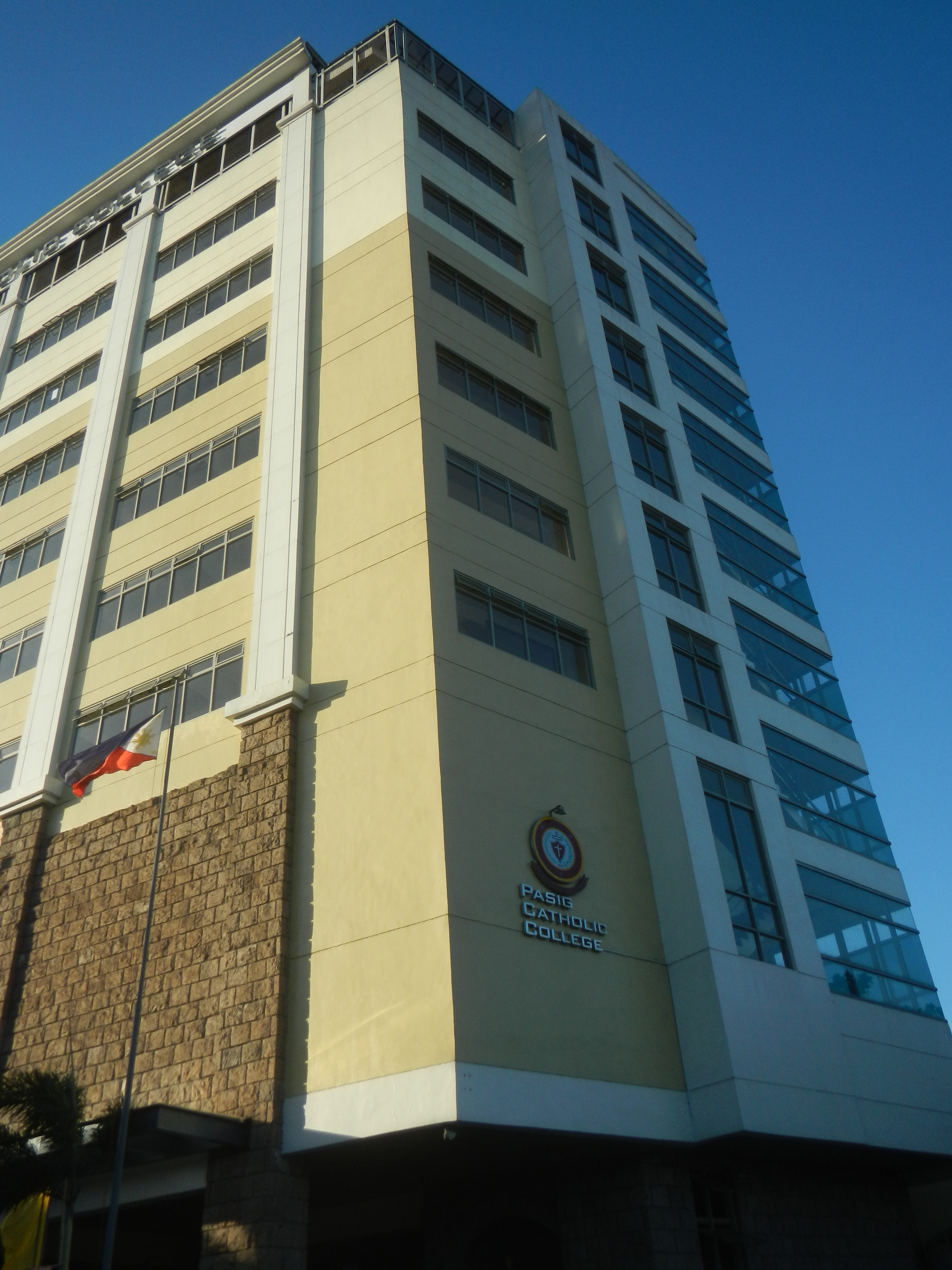
College Campus
