= Pasig's at-large congressional district =

Legislative district of the Philippines

- Constituency for the House of Representatives of the Philippines
- Location of Pasig within Metro Manila
- City: Pasig
- Region: Metro Manila
- Population: 803,159 (2020)
- Electorate: 463,885 (2025)
- Area: 48.46 km^{2} (18.71 sq mi)

Current constituency
- Created: 1987
- Representative: Roman Romulo
- Political party: NPC; Giting ng Pasig
- Congressional bloc: Majority

Pasig's at-large congressional district is the sole congressional district of the Philippines in the city of Pasig. It has been represented in the House of Representatives of the Philippines since 1987. Pasig first elected a single representative city-wide at-large for the 8th Congress following the ratification of the 1987 Constitution that restored the House of Representatives. Before 1987, the city was represented as part of Pasig–Marikina, Rizal's 2nd and at-large district, and Manila's at-large district, respectively. It is currently represented in the 20th Congress by Roman Romulo of the Nationalist People's Coalition (NPC) and Giting ng Pasig.

== Representation history ==
#	Image	Member	Term of office		Congress	Party	Electoral history
#	Image	Member	Start	End	Congress	Party	Electoral history
=== Pasig's at-large district for the House of Representatives of the Philippines ===
District created February 2, 1987 from Pasig–Marikina district.
1		Rufino S. Javier	June 30, 1987	June 30, 1998	8th	Lakas ng Bansa	Elected in 1987.
1		Rufino S. Javier	June 30, 1987	June 30, 1998	9th	NPC	Re-elected in 1992.
1		Rufino S. Javier	June 30, 1987	June 30, 1998	10th	NPC	Re-elected in 1995.
2		Henry P. Lanot	June 30, 1998	March 2, 2004	11th	LAMMP	Elected in 1998.
2		Henry P. Lanot	June 30, 1998	March 2, 2004	12th	LDP	Re-elected in 2001. Removed from office by the House Electoral Tribunal after an electoral protest.
3		Noel M. Cariño	March 2, 2004	June 30, 2004	12th	Lakas	Declared winner of 2001 elections.
4		Robert Jaworski Jr.	June 30, 2004	June 30, 2007	13th	Lakas	Elected in 2004.
5		Roman Romulo	June 30, 2007	June 30, 2016	14th	Lakas	Elected in 2007.
5		Roman Romulo	June 30, 2007	June 30, 2016	15th	Liberal	Re-elected in 2010.
5		Roman Romulo	June 30, 2007	June 30, 2016	16th	Liberal	Re-elected in 2013.
5		Roman Romulo	June 30, 2007	June 30, 2016	16th	Independent	Re-elected in 2013.
6		Richard Eusebio	June 30, 2016	June 30, 2019	17th	Nacionalista	Elected in 2016.
(5)		Roman Romulo	June 30, 2019	Incumbent	18th	Aksyon	Elected in 2019.
(5)		Roman Romulo	June 30, 2019	Incumbent	19th	Independent (Giting ng Pasig)	Re-elected in 2022.
(5)		Roman Romulo	June 30, 2019	Incumbent	20th	NPC (Giting ng Pasig)	Re-elected in 2025.

== Election results ==
=== 2025 ===
Candidate	Party	Votes	%
Roman Romulo (incumbent)	Nationalist People's Coalition	348,939	95.40
Ian Sia	Independent	16,829	4.60
Total		365,768	100.00
Registered voters/turnout		463,885	–
Nationalist People's Coalition hold			
Source: Commission on Elections

=== 2022 ===
2022 Philippine House of Representatives election in Pasig's Lone District
Party	Candidate	Votes	%
Independent	Roman Romulo (Incumbent)	304,157	83.89%
Nacionalista	Ricky Eusebio	54,431	15.01%
Independent	Rex Maliuanag	3,977	1.10%
Total votes		362,565	100.00
Independent hold			

=== 2019 ===
2019 Philippine House of Representatives election in Pasig's Lone District
Party	Candidate	Votes	%
Aksyon	Roman Romulo	225,217	69.56
Nacionalista	Ricky Eusebio	98,547	30.44
Total votes		323,764	100.00
Aksyon gain from Nacionalista			

=== 2016 ===
2016 Philippine House of Representatives election in Pasig's Lone District
Party	Candidate	Votes	%
Nacionalista	Ricky Eusebio	145,677	48.0
Liberal	Christian Sia	87,711	28.9
NPC	Mons Romulo	70,392	23.2
Total votes		303,770	100.0%
Nacionalista gain from Independent			

=== 2013 ===
2013 Philippine House of Representatives election in Pasig's Lone District
Party	Candidate	Votes	%
Liberal	Roman Romulo	217,345	87.43
UNA	Orlando Salatandre, Jr.	31,256	12.57
Total votes		248,601	100%
Liberal hold			

=== 2010 ===
2010 Philippine House of Representatives election in Pasig's Lone District
Party	Candidate	Votes	%
Liberal	Roman Romulo	209,281	90.23
Independent	Francisco Rivera, Jr.	22,659	9.77
Valid ballots		231,940	8.67
Invalid or blank votes		29,627	11.33
Total votes		261,567	100.00
Liberal hold			

=== 1998 ===
1998 Philippine House of Representatives election in Pasig's Lone District
Party	Candidate	Votes	%
LAMMP	Henry Lanot	60,914	43.51
Liberal	Emiliano Caruncho III	42,942	30.67
Lakas	Arnulfo G. Acedera, Jr.	36,139	25.81
Total votes		139,995	100.00
LAMMP gain from NPC			

== See also ==
- Legislative districts of Pasig
