= Roman Romulo =

Filipino politician (born 1967)

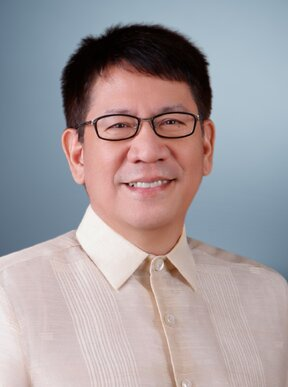
- Official portrait, 2026

Member of the Philippine House of Representatives from Pasig
- Incumbent
- Assumed office June 30, 2019
- Preceded by: Richard Eusebio
- In office June 30, 2007 – June 30, 2016
- Preceded by: Robert Jaworski Jr.
- Succeeded by: Richard Eusebio

Chair of the Philippine House of Representatives Higher and Technical Education Committee
- In office July 30, 2013 – June 30, 2016
- Preceded by: Sonny Angara
- Succeeded by: Dulce Ann Hofer

Personal details
- Born: Roman Tecson Romulo; February 28, 1967 (age 59) Quezon City, Philippines
- Party: NPC (2024–present); Giting ng Pasig (local party; 2021–present)
- Other political affiliations: Aksyon (2018–2021); Liberal (2009–2015); Lakas (2007–2009); KAMPI (2006–2007); Independent (2004–2006; 2015–2018; 2021–2024)
- Spouse: Shalani Soledad (m. 2012)
- Relations: Pio Valenzuela (great-grandfather); Carlos Romulo (granduncle); Bernadette Romulo-Puyat (sister)
- Parents: Alberto Romulo; Rosie Lovely Tecson
- Education: University of the Philippines, Diliman (BA, LL.B.)
- Profession: Lawyer; Politician
- Website: romanromulo.com

Roman Tecson Romulo (born February 28, 1967) is a Filipino politician and lawyer. He served as a member of House of Representatives representing the Lone District of Pasig for four consecutive terms from 2007 to 2016 and from 2019 to present. He is the son of former Foreign Affairs Secretary Alberto Romulo and grand-nephew of President of the United Nations General Assembly Carlos Romulo.

Romulo is known for authoring "Iskolar ng Bayan Act of 2014 (R.A. 10648)", which grants students, belonging to the top 10 bracket of the graduating class of all public high schools in the Philippines, full scholarships on their admission to any state university or college within the region where they graduated.

== Early life and education ==
Romulo was born on February 28, 1967, in Quezon City. He is the third of the five children of diplomat and politician Alberto Romulo and Rosie Lovely Tecson. His father, Alberto, was a former Senator, Budget Secretary, Finance Secretary, Executive Secretary, and Foreign Affairs Secretary.

Romulo attended Ateneo de Manila Grade School for his primary education, where he graduated in 1981. He then attended PAREF Southridge School for his secondary education, where he graduated in 1985. He took a Bachelor's Degree in economics at the University of the Philippines Diliman in Quezon City and graduated in 1990. While studying there, he was a member of Upsilon Sigma Phi. He also obtained a Bachelor of Laws degree at the University of the Philippines College of Law (also in UP Diliman) in 1994.

Romulo was admitted to the bar on June 29, 1995, with Roll No. 40361.

Romulo underwent training course on Legal Aspects of Electronic Commerce at the International Development Law Institute in Rome, Italy in September 2000.

In 2015, Romulo was conferred the degrees of Doctor of Public Administration honoris causa by the Lyceum-Northwestern University and Doctor of Humanities honoris causa by the University of Baguio in 2015.

== Early career ==
Romulo worked as an associate lawyer at Quisumbing Torres & Evangelista Law Offices from 1994 to 1996. He then worked as an associate lawyer at Sycip Salazar Hernandez & Gatmaitan Law Offices from 1996 to 1999 and as a senior associate lawyer at the same law firm from 1999 to 2007. He was one of the founding partners of Tolosa, Romulo, Agabin, Flores & Enriquez Law Offices in 2005.

== Political career ==
=== House of Representatives (2007–2016) ===
Romulo ran in Pasig's lone district during the 2004 election as an independent. He was endorsed by former Senate President Jovito Salonga and supported by former Pasig mayor Vicente Eusebio but lost to Robert Jaworski Jr., who won by a slim margin. Romulo ran again for the House seat during 2007 election and won.

During his term in the House, Romulo was the chairman of committee on Higher and Technical Education and member of the majority of committees on Basic Education and Culture, Constitutional Amendments, Economic Affairs, Human Rights, Information & Communications Technology, Metro Manila Development, Revisions of Laws, Science and Technology, and Veterans Affairs and Welfare.

==== Legislative portfolio ====
As a member of 14th, 15th, and 16th Congress, Romulo authored 59 bills and co-authored 34 bills.

Romulo is the principal author of the House version of the following laws:

Republic Act (House Bill)	Short title	Long title	Source
R.A. 10647 (HB 3575)	Ladderized Education Act of 2014	An Act Strengthening the Ladderized Interface Between Technical-Vocational Education and Training and Higher Education	
R.A. 10648 (HB 4860)	Iskolar ng Bayan Act of 2014	An Act Providing Scholarship Grants to Top Graduates of All Public High Schools in State Universities and Colleges and Appropriating Funds Therefor	
R.A. 10650 (HB 4553)	Open Distance Learning Act	An Act Expanding Access to Educational Services by Institutionalizing Open Distance Learning in Levels of Tertiary Education and Appropriating Funds Therefor	
R.A. 10687 (HB 4591)	Unified Student Financial Assistance System for Tertiary Education (UniFAST) Act	An Act Providing for a Comprehensive and Unified Student Financial Assistance System for Tertiary Education (UniFAST), Thereby Rationalizing Access Thereto, Appropriating Funds Therefor and For Other Purposes	

=== 2016 Senate bid ===
I filed my [Certificate of Candidacy (COC)] for senator, I am independent, and I support the candidacy of Sen. Grace Poe.

— Roman Romulo's statement in English after filing his certificate of candidacy (COC) last October 14, 2015.

Due to limited term for running in congress. Romulo ran for a seat in the Senate during 2016 election under the Partido Galing at Puso, a coalition of senators, Grace Poe and Francis Escudero, for presidential and vice-presidential election, and their line-up for Senate election. He filed his Certificate of Candidacy (COC) at the Commission on Elections office in Palacio del Gobernador, Intramuros, Manila on October 14, 2015. He said he aims to create a “strong middle class” by promoting higher education and lowering income tax rates. He was also endorsed by Davao City Mayor Rodrigo Duterte, who won the presidential election. Romulo, however, didn't win the race and was ranked 22nd on the tally. His sister, Mons, who ran in Pasig's at-large congressional district and lost to Richard Eusebio, said in her Instagram post that their family will remain a helping hand in Pasig and the country despite losing the elections.

=== Return to House of Representatives (2019–present) ===
Romulo ran in Pasig's lone district during the 2019 election as an independent with the support of incoming mayor Vico Sotto. Both of them won.

== Personal life ==
Romulo married politician and television host Shalani Soledad on January 22, 2012, at St. Benedict Church in Ayala Westgrove Heights, Silang, Cavite. Romulo was a member judge on Metrobank Foundation's Search for Outstanding Teachers (SOT) in 2014. In 2015, PeopleAsia's Magazine named him as one of the Men Who Matter awardees.

== Electoral history ==
Electoral history of Roman Romulo
Year	Office	Party		Votes received				Result
Year	Office	Local	National	Total	%	P.	Swing	Result
2004	Representative (Pasig at-large)	—N/a	Independent	—N/a	—N/a	2nd	—N/a	Lost
2007	Representative (Pasig at-large)	—N/a	KAMPI	97,204	—N/a	1st	—N/a	Won
2010	Representative (Pasig at-large)	—N/a	Lakas–Kampi	209,281	90.23%	1st	—N/a	Won
2013	Representative (Pasig at-large)	—N/a	Liberal	217,345	87.43%	1st	—N/a	Won
2019	Representative (Pasig at-large)	—N/a	Aksyon	225,217	69.6%	1st	—N/a	Won
2022	Representative (Pasig at-large)	Giting ng Pasig	Independent	304,157	83.89%	1st	—N/a	Won
2025	Representative (Pasig at-large)	Giting ng Pasig	NPC	348,939	95.40%	1st	—N/a	Won
2016	Senator of the Philippines	—N/a	Independent	4,824,484	10.73%	22nd	—N/a	Lost
