= Legislative districts of Pasig =

Legislative district of the Philippines

The highly urbanized city of Pasig is currently represented in the House of Representatives of the Philippines by its lone congressional district. Every three years, the district elects one representative who will sit on their behalf in the lower house of the legislature. Meanwhile, the city has two councilor districts which are allotted six seats each in the Pasig City Council, with councilors being elected every three years.

== History ==
Pasig was represented as part of the at-large district of the province of Manila in the Malolos Congress from 1898 to 1899, the second district of Rizal from 1907 to 1941 and from 1945 to 1972, the at-large district of Rizal during the National Assembly of the Second Philippine Republic from 1943 to 1944, and the representation of Region IV in the Interim Batasang Pambansa from 1978 to 1984. Pasig was grouped with Marikina in the Regular Batasang Pambansa from 1984 to 1986, as the Legislative district of Pasig–Marikina. It was granted its representation in the restored House of Representatives in 1987 and has consisted of one representative district ever since.

== Lone district ==
The city has yet to be redistricted since it was granted its own district in 1987. The city's current representative is a member of the Nationalist People's Coalition who is part of the majority bloc in the 20th Congress.

Political parties

NPC

Legislative District and Congressional Representative of Pasig City
District	Current Representative	Barangays	Population (2020)	Area
Lone	Roman T. Romulo (since 2022); Ugong	List: Bagong Ilog; Bagong Katipunan; Bambang; Buting; Caniogan; Dela Paz; Kalawaan; Kapasigan; Kapitolyo; Malinao; Manggahan; Maybunga; Oranbo; Palatiw; Pinagbuhatan; Pineda; Rosario; Sagad; San Antonio; San Joaquin; San Jose; San Miguel; San Nicolas; Santa Cruz; Santa Lucia; Santa Rosa; Santo Tomas; Santolan; Sumilang; Ugong	803,159	31.00 km^{2}
