= VST & Company discography =

Discography of filipino musical group

- Studio albums: 5
- Compilation albums: 6
- Singles: 9
- B-sides: 9

VST & Company was a Filipino disco group formed in 1976, who were part of the Manila sound genre.

== Albums ==
=== Studio albums ===
Title	Album details
VST	Released: October 22, 1978; Label: Sunshine
VST 2	Released: 1978; Label: Sunshine
Boogie Woogie Christmas Day	Released: 1979; Label: Sunshine
VST 3	Released: 1979; Label: Sunshine
VST 4	Released: 1980; Label: Sunshine

=== Compilation albums ===
- The Best of VST & Company (1991)
- Awitin Mo at Isasayaw Ko (1994)
- Swing (1994)
- The Complete Greatest Hits Collection (2004)
- 18 Greatest Hits (2009)
- OPM Back to Back Hits of VST & Company & Hagibis (2012)

== Singles ==
- "Ikaw ang Aking Mahal" / "Awitin Mo at Isasayaw Ko" (1978)
- "Disco Fever" / "Magsayawan" (1978)
- "Swing" / "Ayos Ba?" (1978)
- "Rock Baby Rock" / "Ride On 'Ragsy'" (1979)
- "Kiss Kiss" / "Step No, Step Yes" (1979)
- "Merry Christmas (Para Sa Iyo)" / "Boogie Woogie Christmas Day" (1979)
- "Magnifica" / "Etcetera" (1979)
- "The Disco Rock" / "Puwede Ba" (1980)
- "Pakita Mo" / "Super Lover" (1980)
