= Mayor of Pasig =

Local chief executive of Pasig, Philippines

- Punong Lungsod ng Pasig
- Seal of the City of Pasig

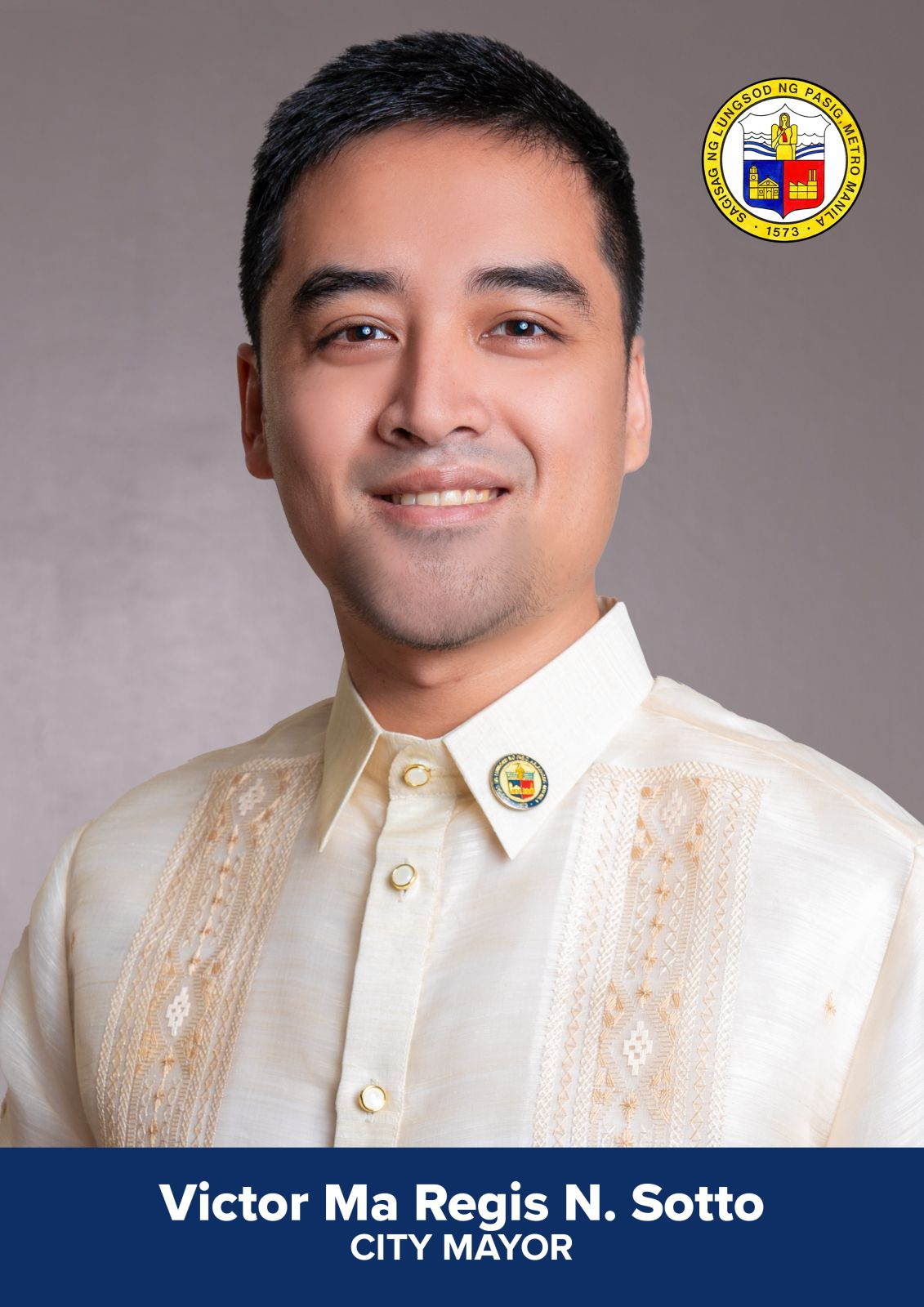
- Incumbent; Vico Sotto since June 30, 2019
- Style: The Honorable
- Seat: Pasig City Hall
- Appointer: Elected via popular vote
- Term length: 3 years

The Mayor of Pasig (Filipino: Punong Lungsod ng Pasig) is the chief executive of the government of Pasig in Metro Manila, Philippines. The mayor leads the city's departments in executing ordinances and delivering public services. The mayorship is a three-year term and each mayor is restricted to three consecutive terms, totaling nine years, although a mayor can be elected again after an interruption of one term.

The current mayor of Pasig is Vico Sotto.

== List ==
| No. | Image | Name of Mayor | Party | Election year | Start of Term | End of Term | Name of Vice Mayor |
|---|---|---|---|---|---|---|---|
American Occupation
| | | Felipe Benicio Gomez | | | 1902 | 1904 | |
| | | Julio Raymundo | | | 1904 | 1906 | |
| | | Jose Feliciano | | | 1906 | 1909 | |
| | | Lupo Miguel | | | 1910 | 1912 | |
| | | Francisco Reyes | | | 1912 | 1915 | |
| | | Alejandro Ramos | | | 1915 | 1918 | |
| | | Fortunato Concepcion | | | 1918 | 1921 | |
| | | Jose Perez | | | 1921 | 1924 | |
| | | Sixto Antonio | | | 1924 | 1935 | Leandro Jabson |
Commonwealth of the Philippines
| | | Cipriano Raymundo | | | 1936 | 1942 | |
Japanese Occupation
| | | Cipriano Raymundo | | | 1942 | 1945 | |
Commonwealth of the Philippines
| | | Bibiano Reynoso | | | February 1945 | April 1945 | |
| | | Apolonio Santiago | | | April 1945 | August 1945 | |
| 1 | | Cipriano Raymundo | | | September 1945 | April 1946 | |
Philippine Republic
| | | Francisco Legaspi | | | 1946 | 1951 | |
| | | Cipriano Raymundo | | | 1952 | 1955 | |
| | | Emiliano Caruncho Jr. | Liberal | | December 30, 1955 | March 26, 1986 | Emiliano Santos (1955–1972) |
| | | Emiliano Caruncho Jr. | KBL | | December 30, 1955 | March 26, 1986 | Vicente P. Eusebio (1980–1986) |
| | | Mario Raymundo | | | March 26, 1986 (Note: Raymundo served as the Officer–in–Charge Mayor from March 26, 1986 to November 30, 1987.) | November 30, 1987 | Boy Reyes |
| | | Emiliano Caruncho Jr. | | | December 5, 1987 (Note: Caruncho served as the Officer–in–Charge Mayor from December 5, 1987 to February 2, 1988.) | February 2, 1988 | Ruben Menguito |
| | | Mario Raymundo | | | February 2, 1988 | June 30, 1992 | Miguel "Mike" Cayton |
| | | Vicente P. Eusebio | | 1992 | June 30, 1992 | June 30, 2001 | Francisco S. de Guzman |
| | | Vicente P. Eusebio | | 1995 | June 30, 1992 | June 30, 2001 | Lorna Bernando |
| | | Vicente P. Eusebio | | 1998 | June 30, 1992 | June 30, 2001 | Lorna Bernando |
| | | Soledad C. Eusebio | | 2001 | June 30, 2001 | June 30, 2004 | Lorna Bernando |
| | | Vicente P. Eusebio | | 2004 | June 30, 2004 | June 30, 2007 | Yoyong Martirez |
| 9 | | Robert C. Eusebio | PMP | 2007 | June 30, 2007 | June 30, 2013 | Yoyong Martirez |
| 9 | | Robert C. Eusebio | Nacionalista | 2010 | June 30, 2007 | June 30, 2013 | Yoyong Martirez |
| 10 | | Maria Belen "Maribel" G. Andaya-Eusebio | Nacionalista | 2013 | June 30, 2013 | June 30, 2016 | Iyo Christian Bernardo |
| 11 | | Robert C. Eusebio | Nacionalista | 2016 | June 30, 2016 | June 30, 2019 | Iyo Christian Bernardo |
| 12 | | Victor Ma. Regis N. Sotto | Aksyon Demokratiko | 2019 | June 30, 2019 | present | Iyo Christian Bernardo |
| 12 | | Victor Ma. Regis N. Sotto | Aksyon Demokratiko | 2022 | June 30, 2019 | present | Robert Jaworski Jr. |
| 12 | | Victor Ma. Regis N. Sotto | Independent | 2025 | June 30, 2019 | present | Robert Jaworski Jr. |

== Vice Mayor of Pasig ==
The Vice Mayor is the second-highest official of the city. The vice mayor is elected via popular vote; although most mayoral candidates have running mates, the vice mayor is elected separately from the mayor. This can result in the mayor and the vice mayor coming from different political parties.

The Vice Mayor is the presiding officer of the Pasig City Council, although he can only vote as the tiebreaker. When a mayor is removed from office, the vice mayor becomes the mayor until the scheduled next election. Robert Jaworski Jr. assumed the post on June 30, 2022.

=== List ===
| # | Image | Vice Mayor | Term start | Term end | Notes |
|---|---|---|---|---|---|
| 1 | | Emiliano Santos | January 1, 1956 | September 23, 1972 | |
| none | | | September 23, 1972 | March 3, 1980 | No vice mayor during Martial Law. |
| 2 | | Vicente P. Eusebio | March 3, 1980 | March 25, 1986 | |
| – | | Boy Reyes | March 26, 1986 (Note: Reyes served as the Officer–in–Charge Vice–Mayor from March 26, 1986 to November 30, 1987.) | November 30, 1987 | |
| – | | Ruben Menguito | December 5, 1987 (Note: Menguito served as the Officer–in–Charge Vice–Mayor from December 5, 1987 to February 2, 1988.) | February 2, 1988 | |
| 3 | | Miguel "Mike" Cayton | February 2, 1988 | June 30, 1992 | |
| 4 | | Francisco S. De Guzman | June 30, 1992 | June 30, 1995 | |
| 5 | | Lorna Bernardo | June 30, 1995 | June 30, 2004 | |
| 6 | | Rosalio D. Martires | June 30, 2004 | June 30, 2013 | |
| 7 | | Christian "Iyo" Caruncho Bernardo | June 30, 2013 | June 30, 2022 | |
| 8 | | Robert "Dodot" Jaworski Jr. | June 30, 2022 | present | |
