= VST 2 =

1978 album by VST & Company

Studio album by VST & Co.
- Released: 1978
- Recorded: 1978
- Studio: Cinema Audio
- Label: Sunshine
- Producer: Edward "Spanky" Rigor

VST & Co. chronology
VST (1978)	VST 2 (1978)	Boogie Woogie Christmas Day (1979)

Singles from VST 2
- 1. "Swing/ Step No... Step Yes" Released: 1978

VST 2 is the second studio album by Filipino Manila sound group VST & Company released in 1978. It features the disco hits "Swing" and "Step No, Step Yes", which were both featured on the film Swing It, Baby starring Vilma Santos, Romeo Vasquez, TVJ and VST themselves. Although the actual group played on the first album VST, session musicians were used for this album.

Val Sotto who was also a comedian and actor and the brother of Tito and Vic Sotto received his first writing credit on "VST Galactica" (titled "Galactic" in the label of the original 1978 release and credited to "Rosario Unite and Edward Rigor"). The last song "Salamat" (Thank You), features the vocal intro of "Swing".

== Track listing ==
All lyrics are written by Joey de Leon; all music is composed by Vic Sotto except where noted.

No.	Title	Length
1.	"Swing (Long Version)"	7:43
2.	"Step No, Step Yes (Long Version)"	6:08
3.	"Mabuti Pa Nung Bata"	4:27
4.	"Galactic" (Spanky Rigor, Charo Unite, Val Sotto)	4:37
5.	"Kahit 'Di Tayo Kasal" (Charo Unite, Joey de Leon)	2:37
6.	"Hindi Ko Akalain" (Lamberto de Leon)	3:19
7.	"Ano Kaya"	4:32
8.	"Salamat..."	0:32
Total length:		33:55

== Personnel ==
According to the album credits.

VST & Co.

- Celso Llarina - rhythm guitar, vocals
- Spanky Rigor - executive producer
- Vic Sotto - lead and background vocals (not credited)

Session musicians credited as 'rhythm section'

- Homer Flores
- Boy Alcaide
- Jun Regalado
- Lorrie Lustre
- Roger Herrera
- Toti Fuentes
