= VST (album) =

1978 album by VST & Company

Studio album by VST & Co.
- Released: October 22, 1978
- Recorded: 1978
- Studio: Cinema Audio
- Genre: Manila sound
- Label: Sunshine
- Producer: Edward "Spanky" Rigor

VST & Co. chronology
VST (1978)	VST 2 (1978)

Singles from VST
- 1. "Ikaw ang Aking Mahal / Awitin Mo at Isasayaw Ko" Released: 1978; 2. "Disco Fever / Magsayawan" Released: 1978

VST is the debut studio album by the Manila sound group VST & Company, released on October 22, 1978. The lead vocalist, Vic Sotto, was not credited and does not even appear in the group's picture at the back of the album, but was thanked in the album credits along with Tito Sotto and Joey de Leon.

== Songs ==
The album contained five of their biggest hits including the ballads "Ikaw ang Aking Mahal" ("You Are My Love") and "Ipagpatawad" ("Please Forgive") as well as the disco numbers "Awitin Mo at Isasayaw Ko" ("You Sing, I'll Dance"), "Disco Fever" and "Magsayawan" ("Let's Dance").

== Track listing ==
All lyrics are written by Joey de Leon; all music is composed by Vic Sotto except where noted

No.	Title	Length
1.	"Awitin Mo at Isasayaw Ko"	8:58
2.	"Disco Fever"	5:27
3.	"Ipagpatawad"	3:33
4.	"Magsayawan" (Charo Unite, Ernie Dela Peña)	3:07
5.	"Ayos Ba?" (Celso Llarina)	3:05
6.	"Sayang Lang..." (Renato Quitoriano, Spanky Rigor)	3:20
7.	"Habang Buhay Kita Mamahalin" (Monet Gaskell)	3:05
8.	"Ikaw ang Aking Mahal" (Vicente Sotto III, Spanky Rigor, Joey de Leon)	3:24
Total length:		33:54

== Personnel ==
According to the album's credits.

- Jun Medina - drums, vocals
- Spanky Rigor - bass guitar, vocals, executive producer
- Male Rigor - keyboards
- Celso Llarina - lead vocals
- Val Sotto, rhythm guitar, vocals
- Roger Rigor - vocals
- Mon Gaskell - keyboards, guitar, vocals
- Amado Triviño - arranger on "Disco Fever", "Ayos Ba?" and "Habang Buhay Kitang Mamahalin"
- Lorrie Illustre - arranger on "Awitin Mo at Isasayaw Ko", "Ipagpatawad", "Magsayawan", "Sayang Lang..." and "Ikaw ang Aking Mahal"
- Jun Regalado - Drums
- Roger Herrera - Bass

Not credited

- Vic Sotto - lead vocals
