= Sotto (surname) =

Sotto means below, under in Italian. It is also a Filipino surname that may refer to:

== Sotto family ==
The Sotto family, a political family in the Philippines with additional influence in the entertainment industry.

- Ali Sotto (born 1961), Filipina actress, newscasts commentator
- Ciara Sotto (born 1980), Filipina actress, singer, and daughter of Tito Sotto and Helen Gamboa
- Filemon Sotto (1872–1966), Filipino politician
- Gian Sotto (born 1978), Filipino politician and son of Tito Sotto and Helen Gamboa
- Lala Sotto, Filipina politician, incumbent MTRCB chairperson, and daughter of Tito Sotto and Helen Gamboa
- Miko Sotto (1982–2003), Filipino matinee idol and actor
- Oyo Boy Sotto (born 1984), Filipino actor and son of Vic Sotto
- Tito Sotto (born 1948), Filipino actor, comedian, politician, and singer-songwriter
- Val Sotto (born 1945), Filipino singer, composer, comedian, and brother of Tito Sotto and Vic Sotto
- Vic Sotto (born 1954), Filipino actor and television presenter
- Vicente Sotto (1877–1950), Filipino politician
- Vico Sotto (born 1989), Filipino politician, son of Vic Sotto, and current mayor of Pasig

== Others with the surname ==
- Benjamin Sotto (born 1980), French heavy metal vocalist
- Eddie Sotto (1958–2025), American designer, mixed-media producer and conceptualist
- Ervin Sotto (born 1981), Filipino basketball player
- Kai Sotto (born 2002), Filipino professional basketball player
- Remberto Sotto (born 1949), Filipino politician
