= Sotto family =

Filipino family of entertainers and politicians

- Filipino political and show business family
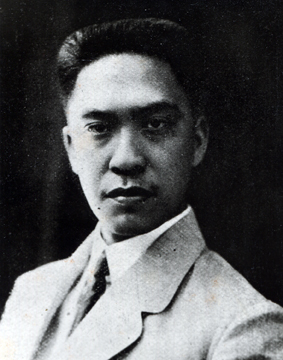
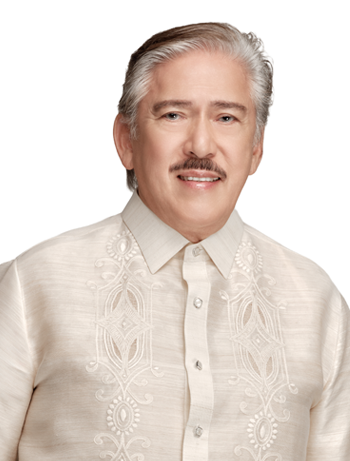
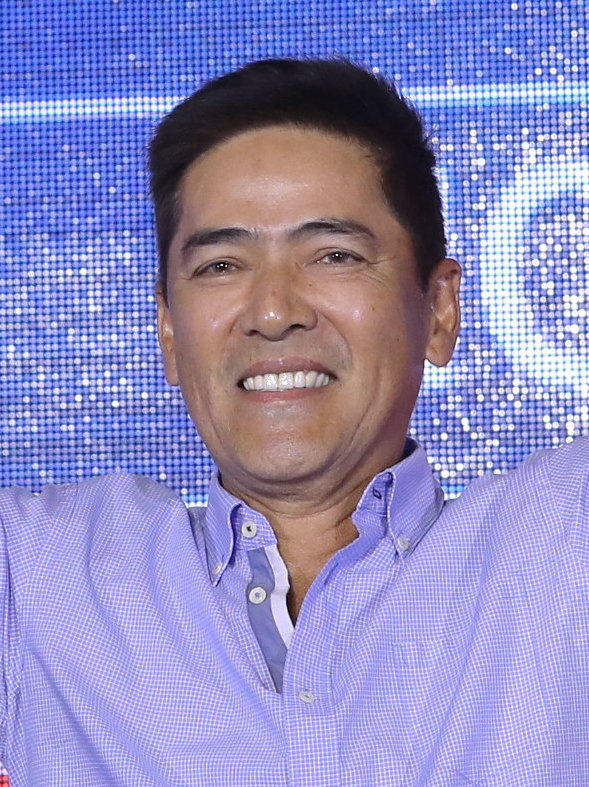
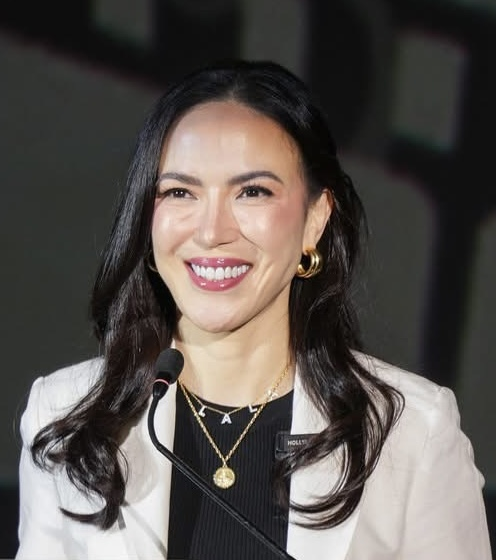
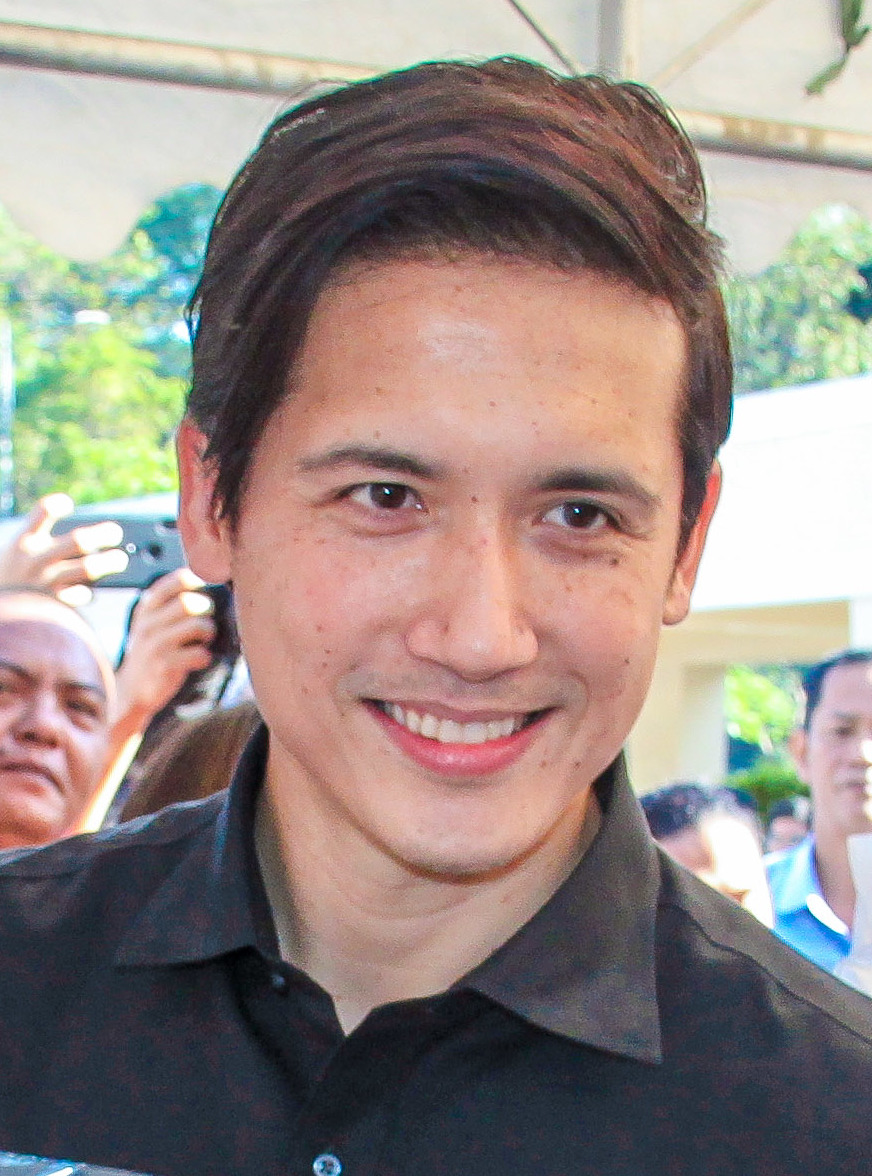
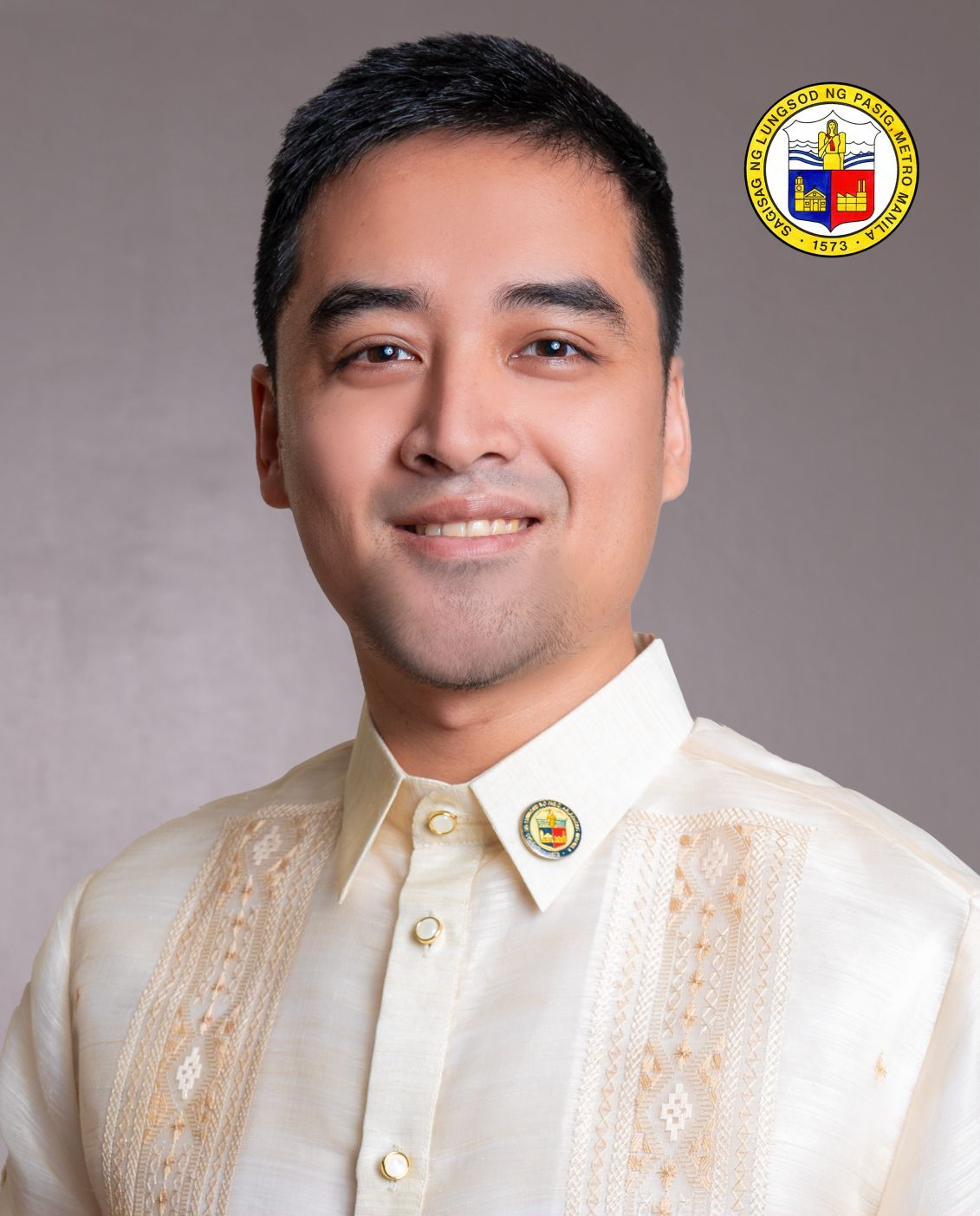
- Vicente Sotto Tito Sotto Vic Sotto Lala Sotto Gian Sotto Vico Sotto
- Country: Philippines
- Current region: Metro Manila
- Origin: Cebu
- Members: See table below
- Traditions: Roman Catholicism

The Sotto family (Tagalog pronunciation: [ˈsɔtɔ]) is a Filipino family of entertainers and politicians.

== List of members ==
1. Filemon Sotto
  1. with Remedios Duterte, had:
    1. Pascuala Sotto
      1. ∞ married Sixto Pahang
        1. Antonio Pahang
  2. ∞ married Carmen Rallos
2. Vicente Y. Sotto Sr.
  1. ∞ married Maria Ojeda
    1. Suga Sotto-Yuvienco
    2. Voltaire Sotto
    3. Filemon O. Sotto
    4. Vicente O. Sotto Jr.
    5. Marcelino Antonio "Nonong" O. Sotto Sr.
      1. ∞ married Herminia Castelo
        1. Val Sotto
          1. ∞ married Theresa Marco
            1. Beverly Sotto
            2. Valerie Sotto
            3. Vanessa Sotto
            4. Viktor Sotto
        2. Vicente "Tito" C. Sotto III
          1. ∞ married Helen Gamboa
            1. Romina Sotto-Generoso
              1. has two children: Romino and Vito.
            2. Diorella Sotto
              1. ∞ married Mike Antonio, they have two children.
            3. Gian Sotto
              1. ∞ married Joy Woolbright, they have six children.
            4. Ciara Sotto
              1. ∞ married Jojo Oconer (annulled), they had one child.
        3. Marcelino Antonio "Maru" C. Sotto Jr.
          1. ∞ married Ali Carag (annulled).
            1. Chino Sotto
            2. Marcelino Antonio "Miko" C. Sotto III
        4. Vic Sotto
          1. ∞ married Dina Bonnevie (annulled)
            1. Danica Sotto
              1. ∞ married Marc Pingris, they have three children.
            2. Oyo Boy Sotto
              1. ∞ married Kristine Hermosa, they have six children.
          2. with Coney Reyes, actress, had:
            1. Vico Sotto
          3. with Angela Luz had:
            1. Paulina Sotto
              1. ∞ married Jed Llanes
          4. ∞ married Pauleen Luna
            1. Talitha Sotto
            2. Thia Sotto
    6. Britania Sotto-Yanong
    7. Francia Sotto
    8. Noli Sotto
    9. Juris Sotto-Lozada
    10. Hispania Sotto-Malvar

== See also ==
- Sotto
