= Sotto =

Sotto means below, under in Italian and may refer to:

== Comunes in Italy ==
=== Bergamo province ===
- Bonate Sotto
- Cenate Sotto
- Osio Sotto
- Sotto il Monte Giovanni XXIII

=== Tuscany ===
- Castelfranco di Sotto in Pisa
- Vagli Sotto in Lucca

=== Elsewhere ===
- Castelnovo di Sotto in Reggio Emilia
- Forni di Sotto in Udine
- Mezzane di Sotto in Verona
- Quarna Sotto in Verbano-Cusio-Ossola, Piedmont
- Tiarno di Sotto in Trentino
- Tramonti di Sotto in Pordenone

== Other ==
- Sotto (surname)
- Sotto Mayor Palace in Lisbon, Portugal
- Sotto voce, intentional voice lowering for emphasis
  - Sotto voce (music)
- Sotto le tombe, a 1915 silent Italian drama film
