= Awitin Mo at Isasayaw Ko =

Song by VST & Company

from the album VST
- A-side: "Ikaw ang Aking Mahal"
- Released: 1978
- Recorded: 1978
- Studio: Cinema Audio
- Genre: Disco
- Length: 8:58 (album version); 4:37 (single version)
- Label: Sunshine
- Composer: Vic Sotto
- Lyricist: Joey de Leon
- Producer: Edward Rigor

"Awitin Mo at Isasayaw Ko" (lit. 'You Sing and I'll Dance') is a disco song by the Filipino group VST & Company. Although released only as a B-side of the ballad single "Ikaw ang Aking Mahal" ("You Are My Love"), it is one of the group's biggest hits in the country. The lyrics were penned by Joey de Leon and its melody by Vic Sotto and arranged by Lorrie Illustre. It was recorded at Cinema Audio in 1978.

De Leon revealed in an interview with Lourd de Veyra on the show Wasak that Sotto sang the melody to him via telephone and he quickly wrote the lyrics. Librettist and Filipino actress Bibeth Orteza recalled that she was present during the recording of this song and said that she told Vic Sotto about the material, Sotto said to her that there is no way she can present it as a contemporary.

In December 2016, Ballet Philippines' new dance musical of the same name featured VST & Company songs.

== Composition ==
Awitin Mo at Isasayaw Ko
A chorus from Awitin Mo at Isasayaw Ko

== Cover versions ==
- Vic Sotto released an English version of the song titled "I'll Sing, C'mon Dance" on his 1979 debut album Marvic.
- Fernando Poe, Jr and Judy Ann Santos covered the song as a duet in the film Isusumbong Kita sa Tatay Ko (1999).
- Singer and actress Jolina Magdangal covered the song for the soundtrack to the film Annie B in 2003.
- The SexBomb Girls covered the song for their 2005 compilation album Sumayaw, Sumunod: The Best of the SexBomb Girls.
- Anne Curtis, Billy Crawford and Darren Espanto performed this song as a medley with "Rock Baby Rock" in 2016.
