= VST 3 =

1979 album by VST & Company

Studio album by VST & Co.
- Released: 1979
- Recorded: 1979
- Studio: Cinema Audio Inc.
- Genre: Manila sound
- Label: Sunshine
- Producer: VST & Co.

VST & Co. chronology
Boogie Woogie Christmas Day (1978)	VST 3 (1979)	VST 4 (1980)

VST 3 is the fourth studio album by the Filipino group VST & Company. The back cover marked the second time on which lead singer Vic Sotto was included.

The medley "VST Concerto in A Minor" (written by Vic Sotto) included the hit single "Rock Baby Rock". "Kiss Kiss" is always included in setlists of TVJ when they perform VST songs in Eat Bulaga!, and the song's intro was used for the now defunct Filipino radio station DZMM (now DWPM Radyo 630) in its segment Radyo Patrol Sais Trenta.

== Track listing ==
Side one
No.	Title	Writer(s)	Length
1.	"VST Concerto in A Minor: Rock Baby Rock (first movement); Sige Lang (second movement); Suite: The Disco Kings; Third Movement: Gold"	Vic Sotto	16:05
Total length:			16:05

Side two
No.	Title	Writer(s)	Length
2.	"Kiss Kiss"	Vic Sotto, Joey de Leon	4:15
3.	"Etcetera"	Tito Sotto, Vic Sotto	3:48
4.	"Ride On 'Ragsy'"	Spanky Rigor, Celso Llarina	2:50
5.	"Huwag Ka Sanang Magagalit"	Monet Gaskell	3:40
Total length:			13:54
