= 2013 Pasig local elections =

7th City elections in Pasig

2013 Pasig mayoral election
- May 13, 2013
Nominee	Maribel Eusebio
Party	Nacionalista	Liberal
Running mate	Rodrigo Asilo	Iyo Christian Bernardo
Popular vote	226,766
Percentage	92.62
Mayor before election
Robert "Bobby" Eusebio
Nacionalista
Elected mayor
Maria Belen "Maribel" Andaya-Eusebio
Nacionalista

Local elections were held in Pasig on May 13, 2013, within the Philippine general election. The voters elected for the elective local posts in the city: the mayor, vice mayor, the congressman, and the councilors, six of them in the two districts of the city.

== Background ==
Mayor Bobby Eusebio was supposed to run for third term, but he withdrew from the race to return to private life. He was replaced by his wife, Maria Belen "Maribel" Andaya-Eusebio, sister of former Budget Secretary Rolando "Nonoy" Andaya Jr. Eusebio was challenged by Wainwright "Win" Rivera and Ismael Mejia.

Vice Mayor Rosalio "Yoyong" Martires was term-limited, and he ran as councilor instead. His place was contested by First District Councilor Iyo Christian Bernardo, Second District Councilor Rodrigo "Roding" Asilo, Vicente "Buddy" Fabella, and Nemencio San Juan.

Rep. Roman Romulo was on his second term, and ran for re-election for a third term. He was challenged by Jun Salatandre of UNA.

== Results ==
=== For Representative ===
Congressional Elections in Pasig's Lone District
Party	Candidate	Votes	%
Liberal	Roman Romulo	217,345	87.43
UNA	Jun Salatandre	31,256	12.57
Total votes		248,601	100.00
Liberal hold			

=== For Mayor ===
Maria Belen "Maribel" Andaya-Eusebio won over Wainwright "Win" Rivera and Ismael Mejia.

Pasig Mayoralty Election
Party	Candidate	Votes	%
Nacionalista	Maria Belen "Maribel" Andaya-Eusebio	226,766	92.62
Independent	Wainwright "Win" Rivera	11,345	4.63
Independent	Ismael "Stoy" Mejia	6,737	2.75
Total votes		244,848	100.00
Nacionalista hold			

=== For Vice Mayor ===
First District Councilor Iyo Christian Bernardo defeated his fellow councilor, Rodrigo "Roding" Asilo of Second District. Bernardo won over Asilo in a tight election with a margin of 17,909 votes.

Pasig Vice Mayoralty Election
Party	Candidate	Votes	%
Liberal	Iyo Christian Bernardo	111,129	53.60
Nacionalista	Rodrigo "Roding" Asilo	53,220	24.96
Independent	Vicente "Buddy" Fabella	41,917	20.93
Independent	Nemencio San Juan	1,062	0.51
Total votes		207,328	100.00
Liberal hold			

=== For City Councilors ===
==== First District ====
City Council Elections in Pasig's First District
Party	Candidate	Votes	%
Liberal	Christian "Ian" Sia	66,553	
Nacionalista	Reynaldo "Rey" San Buenaventura III	62,294	
Nacionalista	Augustin Alexee "Lex" Santiago	58,840	
Nacionalista	Ferdinand "Bing" Avis	53,539	
Nacionalista	Gregorio "Ory" Rupisan Jr.	49,320	
Independent	Rhichie Gerald "Chi" Brown	39,530	
Nacionalista	Renato "Rene" Lipana	36,993	
Independent	Josephine "Jo" Lati	35,229	
Liberal	Jonjon Gamboa	25,501	
Nacionalista	Lorna Angeles-Bernardo	19,440	
UNA	Gary Sta. Ana	7,788	
Independent	Bongzig Asuncion	3,442	
Total votes		458,469	100.00

==== Second District ====
City Council Elections in Pasig's Second District
Party	Candidate	Votes	%
Nacionalista	Richard "Ricky" Eusebio	97,427	
Nacionalista	Orlando "Olly" Benito	86,618	
Nacionalista	Reynaldo "Boy" Raymundo	82,194	
Nacionalista	Charmie "Claire" Benavides	78,828	
Nacionalista	Rosalio "Yoyong" Martires	75,876	
Nacionalista	Wilfredo "Willy" Sityar	69,290	
Liberal	Aquilino "Kaye" Dela Cruz Jr.	61,555	
Independent	Alan Sy	14,639	
Independent	Alberto "Bert" Vidayo	8,185	
Independent	Ronnie Ibe	7,688	
Independent	Edmark Diao	4,607	
Total votes		586,907	100.00
