= Zagu =

Philippine beverage brand

- Logo
- Type: Private
- Industry: Food and beverage
- Founded: April 1999
- Founder: Genevieve Lim-Santos
- Headquarters: Pasig, Philippines
- Number of locations: 500+ (2024)
- Area served: Philippines, United Arab Emirates
- Products: Pearl shakes
- Owner: Zagu Foods Corporation

Zagu is a Philippine beverage brand that sells pearl shakes containing tapioca balls. Established in April 1999, the company introduced products with tapioca pearls to the Philippine market prior to the widespread popularity of milk tea in the 2010s. Zagu operates through an authorized dealership model and has over 500 locations in the Philippines and the United Arab Emirates.

== History ==
=== Founding and early years ===
Zagu was founded by Genevieve Lim-Santos, a Food Science graduate from the University of British Columbia in Vancouver, Canada. Lim-Santos returned to the Philippines in 1997 during the 1997 Asian financial crisis. She observed the sales of bubble tea in Vancouver and decided to introduce a similar concept to the Philippines.

During the development phase, Lim-Santos removed the tea component from the original Taiwanese bubble tea concept. She localized the product by focusing on flavored shakes mixed with tapioca pearls, known locally as sago, as she believed the Filipino market at the time was not yet accustomed to tea-based drinks. She utilized her father's coffee shop to test the initial flavors, which included Taro and Honeydew.

The first Zagu outlet opened in April 1999 as a roadside kiosk along A. Mabini Street in San Juan. The number of outlets increased to over 200 by 2001. In 2001, Zagu received the "Most Innovative Business Venture" and "Most Outstanding Business Venture" awards at the 16th Annual Parangal ng Bayan.

=== Trademark dispute ===
In January 2001, Zagu Foods Corporation filed a lawsuit against Kerrisdale Food Corp., a former franchisee, for copyright infringement and unfair competition. Zagu alleged that the respondent's brand, "Shago," used a trademark, color scheme, and operational procedure that were substantially similar to Zagu's.

=== International expansion ===
The company expanded its operations to the United Arab Emirates. In November 2017, Zagu opened an outlet in Little Manila, a Filipino-themed dining complex in Abu Dhabi.

== Products and business model ==
Zagu sells pearl shakes, which are blended drinks containing tapioca pearls. The menu includes flavors such as Taro, Honeydew, Halo-halo, Ube, and Cappuccino.

The company operates under an authorized dealership system rather than a traditional franchise model. Dealers invest in a package that covers the cart construction, equipment, and training, but the company does not charge royalty fees.

== Labor issues ==
In June 2019, the Organization of Zagu Workers-Solidarity of Unions in the Philippines for Empowerment and Reforms (Organiza-Super) launched a strike against Zagu Foods Corporation. The union protested alleged unfair labor practices, including union-busting and illegal contractualization. Union officials stated that approximately 250 employees performing core functions, such as machine operators and service crew, were contracted through manpower agencies instead of being regularized.

On June 28, 2019, the National Labor Relations Commission (NLRC) issued a temporary restraining order (TRO) prohibiting the striking workers from blocking the company's entry and exit points. On July 8, 2019, a clash occurred at the Zagu factory in Pasig when pro-management workers attempted to disperse the picket line.

Pasig City Mayor Vico Sotto intervened in the dispute, reminding the management to respect the workers' right to strike as long as they did not block the ingress and egress of the facility. Sotto criticized the company for keeping employees on contractual status for over a decade. The Commission on Human Rights also issued a statement supporting the workers' rights to protest and calling for the upholding of labor dignity.
