= Magsayawan =

Song by VST & Company

from the album VST
- A-side: "Disco Fever"
- Released: 1978
- Recorded: 1978
- Studio: Cinema Audio
- Genre: Disco; Manila sound
- Songwriters: Charo Unite, Ernie Dela Peña
- Producers: VST & Co.

"Magsayawan" (English: Let's Dance) is a song recorded by the Filipino disco group VST & Company, written by the songwriting team of Charo Unite and Ernie dela Peña. It was one of the group's biggest hits in the Philippines and was the only hit single not written by the group's principal songwriters, Vic Sotto and Joey de Leon.

It was recorded at Cinema Audio and released on the group's first album, VST, in 1978. Although only released as a B-side of "Disco Fever", this song was one of the group's popular hits. The song's music video is in the 1979 film Swing It, Baby with other VST songs by Vilma Santos, Romeo Vasquez, Amy Austria, Tito and Vic & Joey. In the film, the comedy trio Tito, Vic & Joey are seen dancing along with others including Santos, as the band is playing.

== Cover versions ==
- The Pinay group Cherries on A Taste of Love (1998)
- Dianne dela Fuente in the film Ngayong Nandito Ka (2003) which was also released on the soundtrack.
- Aiza Seguerra in 2011
- Luke Mijares in 2012
- Enrique Gil on King of the Gil (2013)
