= 2019 Pasig local elections =

9th City elections in Pasig

2019 Pasig mayoral election
- May 13, 2019
- Turnout: 76.39% ▼6.47 pp
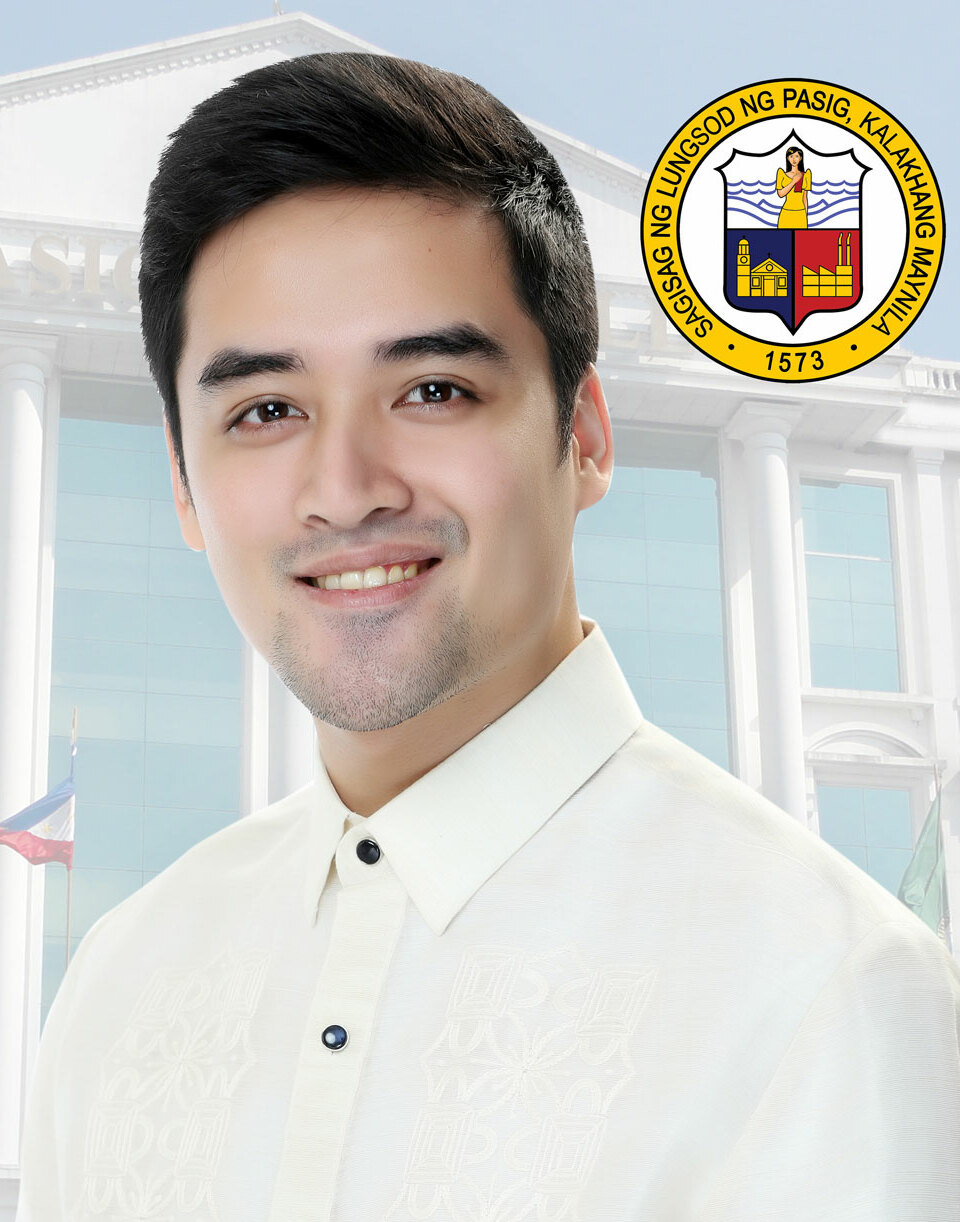
Nominee	Victor Ma. Regis "Vico" Sotto	Robert "Bobby" Eusebio
Party	Aksyon	Nacionalista
Running mate		Iyo Christian Bernardo
Popular vote	209,370	121,556
Percentage	63.27	36.73
- Results by barangay
Mayor before election
Robert "Bobby" Eusebio
Nacionalista
Elected mayor
Victor Ma. Regis "Vico" Sotto
Aksyon

Local elections took place in Pasig on Monday, May 13, 2019, as part of the 2019 Philippine general election. The voters elected a mayor, a vice mayor, and a total of 12 councilors - six from each of the city's two districts.

== Background ==
Mayor Robert "Bobby" Eusebio was on first term, third non-consecutive term, and he ran for re-election for second term, third non-consecutive term. Eusebio became mayor for three terms (2007-2010, 2010-2013, and 2016-2019). He was challenged by First District Councilor Victor Ma. Regis "Vico" Sotto.

Vice Mayor Iyo Christian Bernardo was on his second term, and was elected unopposed for a third term.

Rep. Richard "Ricky" Eusebio was on his first term, and ran for re-election for a second term. He was challenged by his predecessor, former Rep. Roman Romulo.

== Results ==
=== For Mayor ===
Second District Councilor Victor Ma. Regis "Vico" Sotto defeated Mayor Robert "Bobby" Eusebio. Sotto won against Eusebio with a margin of 87,814 votes, ending the Eusebio dynasty's 27-year hold on Pasig.

Pasig Mayoral Elections
Party	Candidate	Votes	%
Aksyon	Victor Ma. Regis "Vico" Sotto	209,370	63.27
Nacionalista	Robert "Bobby" Eusebio	121,556	36.73
Total votes		330,926	100.00
Aksyon gain from Nacionalista			

==== Results by Barangay ====
Barangay	Sotto		Eusebio	
Barangay	Votes	%	Votes	%
Bagong Ilog	5,407	3,277	62.26	37.7
Bagong Katipunan	487	490	49.85	50.15
Bambang	7,131	3,788	65.31	34.69
Buting	3,732	1,808	67.36	32.64
Caniogan	9,310	4,592	66.97	33.03
Dela Paza	5,383	3,442	61.00	39.00
Kalawaan	8,818	5,695	60.76	39.24
Kapasigan	2,644	1,262	67.69	32.31
Kapitolyo	3,136	2,213	58.63	41.37
Malinao	2,034	1,345	60.20	39.80
Manggahan	23,406	13,247	63.86	36.14
Maybunga	11,458	5,979	65.71	34.29
Oranbo	1,084	942	53.50	46.50
Palatiw	8,186	3,842	68.06	31.94
Pinagbuhatan	35,846	21,232	62.80	37.20
Pineda	5,325	3,505	60.31	39.69
Rosario	16,008	9,252	63.37	36.63
Sagad	2,726	1,823	59.93	40.07
San Antonio	2,080	1,300	61.54	38.46
San Joaquin	4,288	2,660	61.72	38.28
San Jose	932	671	58.14	41.86
San Miguel	10,869	5,212	67.59	32.41
San Nicolas	804	662	54.84	45.16
Santa Cruz	1,730	1,520	53.23	46.77
Santa Lucia	11,129	7,048	61.23	38.77
Santa Rosa	318	644	33.06	66.94
Santo Tomas	3,698	2,443	60.22	39.78
Santolan	13,366	7,781	63.21	36.79
Sumilang	2,101	1,222	63.23	36.77
Ugong	5,934	2,659	69.06	30.94
Total	209,370	121,556	63.27	36.73

=== For Vice Mayor ===
Vice Mayor Iyo Christian Bernardo won unopposed.

Pasig Vice Mayoral Elections
Party	Candidate	Votes	%
PDP–Laban	Iyo Christian Bernardo	270,879	100.00
Total votes		270,879	100.00
PDP–Laban hold			

=== For Representative ===
Former Rep. Roman Romulo defeated Rep. Richard "Ricky" Eusebio.

Congressional Elections in Pasig's Lone District
Party	Candidate	Votes	%
Aksyon	Roman Romulo	225,217	69.56
Nacionalista	Ricky Eusebio	98,547	30.44
Total votes		323,764	100.00
Aksyon gain from Nacionalista			

=== For City Councilors ===
==== First District ====
City Council Elections in Pasig's First District
Party	Candidate	Votes	%
PDP–Laban	Ferdinand "Bing" Avis	78,892	13.92
PDP–Laban	Gregorio "Ory" Rupisan Jr.	77,712	13.71
Nacionalista	Rhichie Gerard Brown	76,664	13.53
Nacionalista	Reynaldo' "Rey" San Buenaventura III	76,075	13.42
Nacionalista	Regino "Reggie" Balderama	73,767	13.02
Nacionalista	Alejandro "Andy" Santiago	72,422	12.78
Independent	Raymund Francis "Kiko" Rustia	69,741	12.30
PDP–Laban	Albino "Andy" Cheng	41,506	7.32
Total votes		566,779	100.00

==== Second District ====
City Council Elections in Pasig's Second District
Party	Candidate	Votes	%
Nacionalista	Mario "Jun-Jun" Concepcion Jr.	133,372	16.18
Nacionalista	Orlando "Olly" Benito	129,075	15.66
Nacionalista	Rodrigo "Roding" Asilo	127,935	15.52
Nacionalista	Corazon "Corie" Raymundo	122,883	14.90
Nacionalista	Wilfredo "Willie" Sityar	119,983	14.55
Nacionalista	Rosalio "Yoyong" Martires	117,296	14.23
Independent	Salvador "Bobby" Hapin	73,919	8.97
Total votes		824,463	100.00

Notes

- First District Councilor Alejandro "Andy" Santiago died on June 14, 2019. His wife, Edith, was named as his substitute, later she took her office on October 16, 2019.
- Second District Councilor Rodrigo "Roding" Asilo died on May 27, 2021. His daughter, Syvel, was named as his substitute, later she took her office on January 4, 2022.
