= Rock Baby Rock =

1978 song by Filipino disco group VST & Company

Single by VST & Co.

from the album VST 3
- B-side: Ride On 'Ragsy'
- Released: 1978
- Genre: Manila sound
- Length: 4:00
- Label: Sunshine
- Songwriter: Marvic Sotto
- Producers: VST & Co.

VST & Co. singles chronology
"Swing" (1978)	"Rock Baby Rock" (1978)	"Kiss Kiss" (1979)

"Rock Baby Rock" is a song by Filipino disco group VST & Company, written by Vic Sotto. It is part of a medley called "VST Concerto in A Minor" on the album VST 3. It was one of the group's biggest hits produced by the band themselves. Sotto said in an interview on PTV's Xiao Time segment that it was his most favorite VST song because he put a lot of effort into it.

The film of the same name was named after this song, starring Vilma Santos, Rolly Quizon, Tito Sotto, Vic Sotto, Joey de Leon and VST & Company themselves.

During Eat Bulaga!'s show in Toronto, Canada on 12 April 2014, Joey de Leon performed the song until the rest of the hosts on the show joined him including Tito and Vic Sotto. It was also performed by the reunited VST & Co. (except Val and Vic Sotto) during a tribute to Snaffu Rigor on August 8, 2016.

== Cover versions ==
- It was performed by Rey Valera, Aegis, Jaya and Kyla on SiS as a part of their VST medley along with "Awitin Mo at Isasayaw Ko" and "Magsayawan".
- Kala covered the song for the album The Best of Manila Sound: Hopia Mani Popcorn.
- Enrique Gil recorded a medley of "Rock Baby Rock" along with "Magsayawan" on his debut album, King of the Gil.
