= 2016 Pasig local elections =

8th City elections in Pasig

2016 Pasig mayoral election
- May 9, 2016
- Turnout: 82.86%
Nominee	Robert "Bobby" Eusebio
Party	Nacionalista
Running mate	Iyo Christian Bernardo (Liberal)
Popular vote	282,812
Percentage	95.56
Mayor before election
Maria Belen "Maribel" Eusebio
Nacionalista
Elected mayor
Robert "Bobby" Eusebio
Nacionalista

Local elections were held in Pasig on May 9, 2016, within the Philippine general election. The voters elected for the elective local posts in the city: the mayor, vice mayor, the congressman, and the councilors, six of them in the two districts of the city.

== Background ==
Mayor Maria Belen "Maribel" Andaya-Eusebio was on her first term. Although eligible for re-election, she did not run. Her husband, former Mayor Robert "Bobby" Eusebio ran in her place instead. Eusebio faced independent candidate Odylon Vincent "Odyi" Ramos.

Vice Mayor Iyo Christian Bernardo was on his first term, and he ran for re-election for second term. He was challenged by Baltazar "Val" Iglesias.

Rep. Roman Romulo was term-limited, and he ran for senator. His party chose his sister, columnist Mons Romulo-Tantoco to run in his place. Romulo-Tantoco was challenged by Second District Councilor Richard "Ricky" Eusebio and First District Councilor Christian "Ian" Sia.

== Results ==
=== For Mayor ===
Former Mayor Robert "Bobby" Eusebio overwhelmingly won over independent Odylon Vincent Ramos.

Pasig Mayoralty election
Party	Candidate	Votes	%
Nacionalista	Robert "Bobby" Eusebio	282,812	95.56
Independent	Odylon Vincent Ramos	13,128	4.44
Total votes		295,940	100.00

=== For Vice Mayor ===
Vice Mayor Iyo Christian Bernardo overwhelmingly won over independent Baltazar "Val" Iglesias.

Pasig Vice Mayoralty election
Party	Candidate	Votes	%
Liberal	Iyo Christian Bernardo	273,378	95.76
Independent	Baltazar "Val" Iglesias	12,108	4.24
Total votes		285,486	100.00

=== For Representative ===
Congressional Elections in Pasig's Lone District
Party	Candidate	Votes	%
Nacionalista	Richard "Ricky" Eusebio	145,677	47.96
Liberal	Christian "Ian" Sia	87,711	28.87
NPC	Mons Romulo-Tantoco	70,392	23.17
Total votes		303,770	100.00

=== For City Councilors ===
==== First District ====
City Council Elections in Pasig's First District
Party	Candidate	Votes	%
Independent	Victor Ma. Regis "Vico" Sotto	85,677	
PDP–Laban	Ferdinand "Bing" Avis	69,098	
PDP–Laban	Gregorio "Ory" Rupisan Jr.	64,767	
Nacionalista	Rhichie Gerard Brown	60,905	
Independent	Alejandro "Andy" Santiago	56,407	
Independent	Regino "Reggie" Balderama	55,603	
Nacionalista	Bernard Perez	48,179	
Nacionalista	Joey Mojica	40,870	
Independent	Raymund Francis "Kiko" Rustia	36,933	
Nacionalista	Danny Tuano	35,331	
Liberal	Eriberto "Bobot" Guevarra	21,825	
Liberal	Albino "Andy" Cheng	18,565	
Independent	Juan Dela Cruz	8,080	
Total votes		602,240	

==== Second District ====
City Council Elections in Pasig's Second District
Party	Candidate	Votes	%
Nacionalista	Rodrigo "Roding" Asilo	135,216	
Nacionalista	Mario "Junjun" Concepcion Jr.	130,390	
Nacionalista	Orlando "Olly" Benito	128,531	
Nacionalista	Wilfredo "Willy" Sityar	122,777	
Nacionalista	Corazon "Corie" Raymundo	120,957	
Nacionalista	Rosalio "Yoyong" Martires	119,324	
Independent	Bobby Bobis	84,897	
Independent	Salvador "Bobby" Hapin	69,629	
Independent	Alberto "Bert" Vidayo	16,847	
Total votes		888,568	
