= Jun Regalado =

Filipino drummer

- Birth name: Nemesio Regalado Jr.
- Origin: Pakil, Laguna
- Instrument: Drums

Nemesio Regalado Jr., known professionally as Jun Regalado, is a Filipino drummer and session musician. He has been dubbed "the most recorded drummer in the Philippines" with a career spanning more than 55 years.

Regalado recorded drum tracks for over 400 albums with various performers and bands such as the Mabuhay Singers, Pilita Corrales, Imelda Papin, Hagibis, Rey Valera, Gary Valenciano, Ryan Cayabyab, Celeste Legaspi, Apo Hiking Society, Basil Valdez, Zsa Zsa Padilla, Sharon Cuneta, VST & Co., and many others. Regalado has also earned recognition internationally, having worked with David Pomeranz, The Lettermen, Matt Monroe, Spiral Starecase, Stephen Bishop, and John Ford Coley.

== Life and career ==
Regalado hails from a family of musicians in Pakil, Laguna. His father Nemesio, Sr. was a bandleader while his brothers Rudy and Pete play the drums and piano, respectively, and his sisters Virginia, Maria, Rosalinda and Theresa all play the piano. At age 5, his father taught him how to play the saxophone, clarinet, and oboe. By age 14, he began playing drums for his father's orchestra.

While still a teenager, Regalado recorded for Villar Records where he worked with acts such as the Mabuhay Singers and Jun Polistico. His big break came when actor Jose Mari Gonzales, then the owner of recording studio Cinema-Audio, noticed Regalado's unique drumming style and recommended him to fellow producers and musical acts.

At age 15, Regalado was hired as the drummer for Pilita Corrales' weekly TV show An Evening with Pilita and Nora Aunor's TV series Superstar, among various recording work for film scores, TV commercials and ad jingles. During the 1970s and 1980s, Regalado was the most sought-after session drummer in the Philippine music industry. He also performed on ABS-CBN's noontime variety show Stop, Look, and Listen.

In 1977, he recorded the tracks "I Found It" and "Pinoy Funk" for a solo album project, but was unable to finish the rest of the album due to his busy recording schedule.

More recently, Regalado established J.R. Recording Studios, a 24-track, two-inch tape analog facility. As of 2022, Regalado still plays drums and runs a drum clinic.

Regalado has four children, of which two also pursued musical careers: his son Niño is the drummer and backing vocalist for Neocolours while his other son Nemesio III, known as Junjun, currently plays drums for Bamboo Mañalac's solo act.
