= Vico Sotto =

Filipino politician (born 1989)

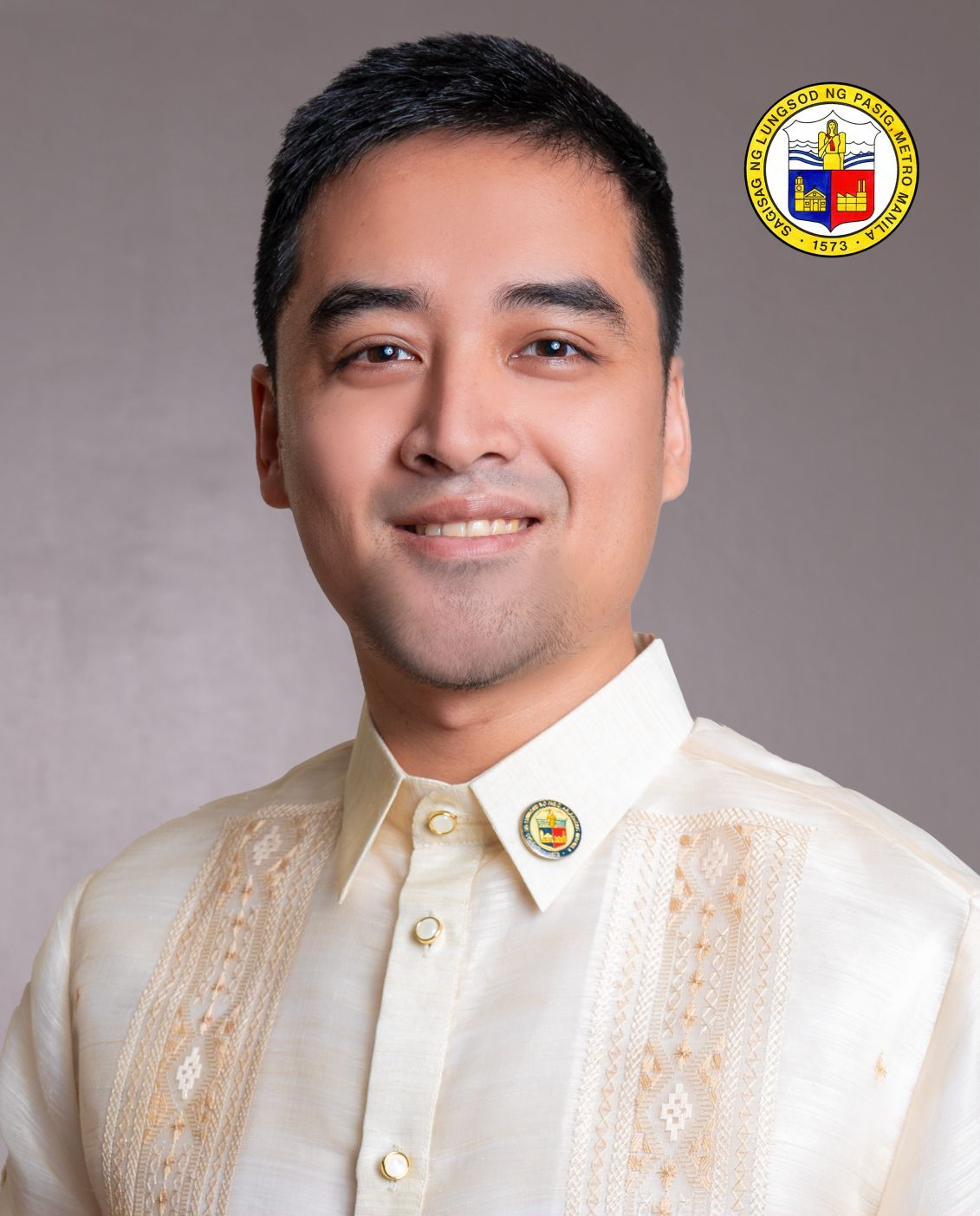
- Official portrait, 2025

12th Mayor of Pasig
- Incumbent
- Assumed office June 30, 2019
- Vice mayor: Iyo Bernardo (2019–2022); Robert Jaworski Jr. (2022–present)
- Preceded by: Bobby Eusebio

Member of the Pasig City Council from the 1st District
- In office June 30, 2016 – June 30, 2019

Personal details
- Born: Victor Ma. Regis Nubla Sotto; June 17, 1989 (age 37) Quezon City, Philippines
- Party: Independent (2015–2018; 2022–present); Giting ng Pasig (local party; 2021–present)
- Other political affiliations: Aksyon (2018–2022)
- Education: Brent International School (secondary)
- Alma mater: Ateneo de Manila University (AB, MPM)
- Occupation: Politician
- Parents: Vic Sotto (father); Coney Reyes (mother)
- Relatives: Sotto family LA Mumar (half-brother)

Victor Ma. Regis "Vico" Nubla Sotto ([ˈbiko ˈsɔtɔ]; born June 17, 1989) is a Filipino politician serving as the 12th mayor of Pasig since 2019. He previously served as a member of the Pasig City Council representing the city's first district from 2016 to 2019. Since assuming office as mayor, Sotto has led reforms centered on transparency, accountability, fiscal responsibility, digitalization of government services, and the improvement of public service delivery, contributing to Pasig's growing recognition for good local governance.

A member of the Sotto family, Sotto graduated from the Ateneo de Manila University with a degree in political science in 2011 before earning a Master of Public Management. He entered public service in 2016 after winning a seat in the Pasig City Council as an independent candidate, where he advocated measures on transparency, youth development, education, and local governance before seeking the city's highest elective office.

Sotto gained national attention during the 2019 Pasig local elections after defeating incumbent mayor Bobby Eusebio, ending the Eusebio family's 27-year leadership of Pasig. His victory was widely viewed as a shift toward governance reforms that emphasized transparency, anti-corruption initiatives, participatory governance, and improved public services. During his tenure, the city government expanded social welfare programs, strengthened healthcare and education initiatives, modernized public facilities, and implemented infrastructure and digital governance projects. His administration's response to the COVID-19 pandemic in Metro Manila and its broader governance reforms have received positive assessments from various government agencies, civil society organizations, and media outlets, while earning recognition for transparency, innovation, and sound public administration.

== Early life and career ==
Sotto was born on June 17, 1989, to actor-comedian-host Vic Sotto and actress Coney Reyes, celebrities strongly associated with the noontime variety show Eat Bulaga!. The public expected Sotto would make regular appearances on the show, but he kept a low profile and exhibited an early interest in government at the age of 10. He attended preschool at the Philippine Montessori Center with future actress Janine Gutierrez as his classmate. Sotto attended Brent International School for most of his grade school and high school. He graduated from the Ateneo de Manila University in 2011 with a Bachelor of Arts in Political Science, and earned a Master of Arts in Public Management from the Ateneo School of Government in 2018.

In 2018, Sotto received the YSEALI Professional Fellowship Award. He did his professional residency at the Iowa Public Information Board as part of the fellowship. Before entering politics, Sotto taught social science at Arellano University for one semester.

== Early political career ==
Sotto was elected as a member of Sangguniang Panlungsod (City Council) of Pasig in 2016, serving a single term before he was sworn in as Mayor on June 30, 2019. As an independent Councilor, Sotto faced stiff opposition to his initiatives, making it difficult for him to introduce legislation. He focused his attention on "The Pasig Transparency Mechanism Ordinance," which seeks the disclosure of public records, including financial documents and contracts, upon request by ordinary citizens. Upon its passage, it became the first-ever localized version of the freedom of information law in Metro Manila.

== Pasig mayoral campaigns ==
=== 2019 ===
Sotto sought the mayoralty of Pasig in the 2019 Pasig local elections. He campaigned on a platform he referred to as the "Big V" (Big Five) Agenda, which promotes universal healthcare, housing programs, education, public consultation, and anti-corruption efforts. During the campaign, Sotto indicated healthcare as his top priority and called for an adequate supply of medicine in the city's public health facilities. For housing, Sotto promised every family residing in Pasig would be able to own a house and assured the rights of informal settlers would be respected. Sotto also pledged to ease scholarship application processes for Pasig residents through simplifying requirements. Sotto also indicated that his administration's anti-corruption drive would begin with the establishment of a "Government Efficiency and Anti-Corruption Commission," the establishment of a Pasig anti-corruption hotline, and assurance that a non-governmental organization or civil society organization would watch over each of the city government's bidding processes.

In response to the management style of the previous administration, Sotto also promised that all city government decisions would undergo a public consultation process. He also promised transparency in government projects, from planning to implementation, to monitoring and evaluation. More specific initiatives proposed by Sotto under this agenda item include public officials appointing members on local special bodies, and forming sectoral councils in areas such as transport and environmental protection, tasked with developing legislation in those areas.

A key strategy Sotto pledged to use to achieve his five-point campaign platform was data-driven governance. On the campaign trail, he stated that one of the roots of poor public service in Pasig was the culture of "palakasan," in which citizens exerted themselves to gain the favor of public officials to access services. Sotto's proposed solution to this problem was to ensure that decisions on the provision and prioritization of services would be based on data, rather than the political will or whims of officials.

Sotto went on to defeat incumbent mayor Bobby Eusebio, ending the 27-year rule of the Eusebio family over the Pasig mayoralty.

=== 2022 ===
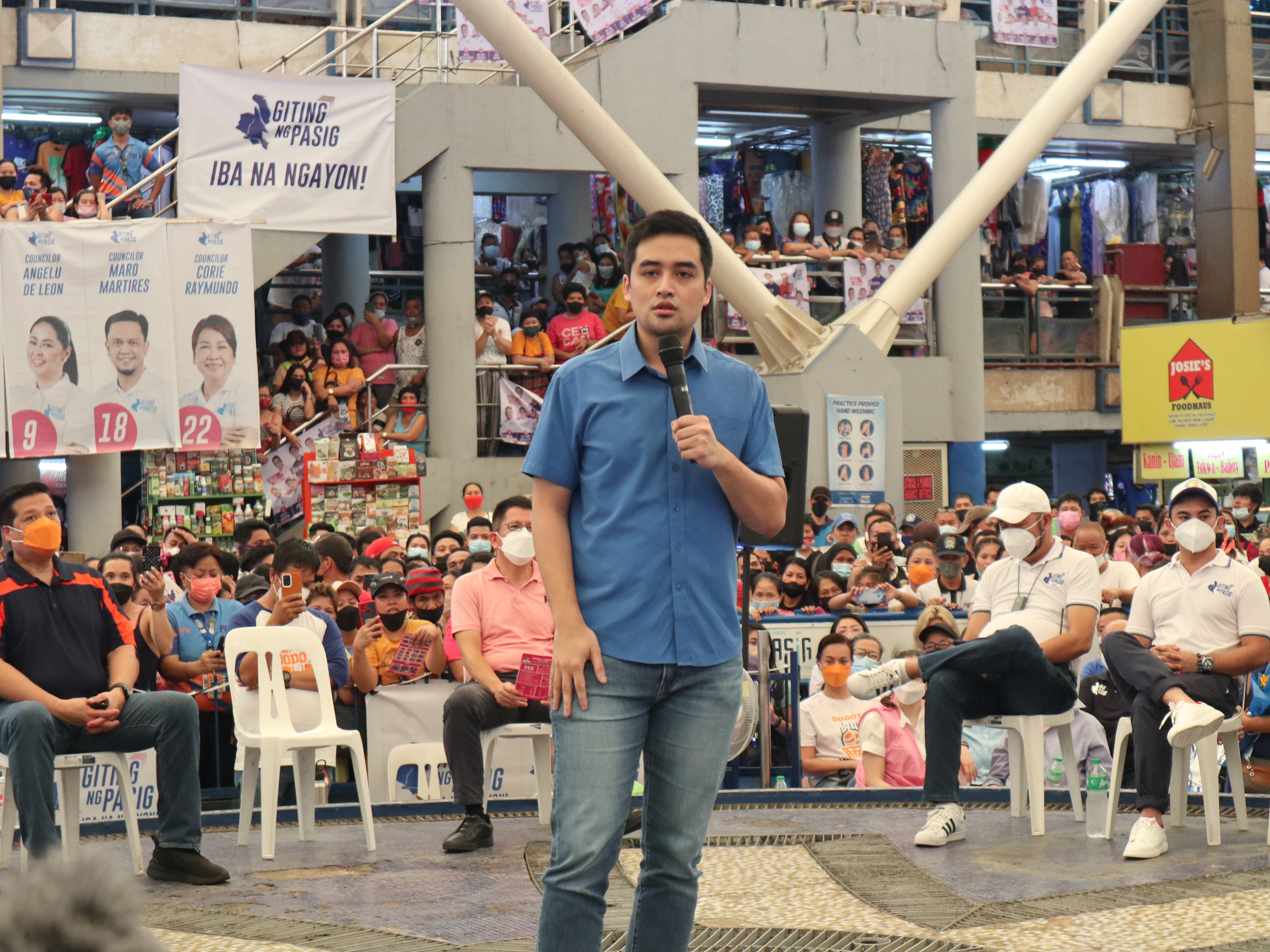
Sotto at Giting ng Pasig's campaign rally at Pasig Mega Market on March 25, 2022

In 2019, Sotto joined Aksyon Demokratiko, a national political party founded by former Senator Raul Roco in 1997. He was sworn into the party alongside Roman Romulo, who won as representative in Pasig's sole legislative district and Marielle del Rosario, who ran as representative of Navotas. Despite political pressure, Sotto refused to join larger, more established parties, explaining that he chose to join Aksyon Demokratiko because he shared its platform of pushing for freedom of information, political party reform, and the end of political dynasties.

In July 2021, Sotto announced his plans to run for reelection as Pasig mayor in the 2022 Pasig local elections. While he did not have a running mate for vice mayor in 2019, Sotto selected former Pasig representative Robert Jaworski Jr. as his running mate for vice mayor. They ran under the Giting ng Pasig (Bravery of Pasig) ticket. They were elected in the election, defeating the ticket of incumbent vice mayor Iyo Bernardo and lawyer Ian Sia. Six months after his re-election as Pasig mayor in 2022, Sotto resigned from Aksyon Demokratiko due to differences regarding the party's direction, noting that "recent events have made it apparent" that its members no longer shared similar political goals and ideals.

=== 2025 ===
In August 2024, St. Gerrard Construction intended to file a lawsuit against Sotto, who accused the former for alleged hakot (local slang for people summoned and perhaps paid to be warm bodies in a political activity such as rallies) of protesters from Quezon City against his ₱6 billion new city hall project. Pasig resident Ethelmart Cruz filed with the Ombudsman a graft complaint against Sotto, officers Melanie de Mesa and Jeronimo Manzanero, anchored on an alleged tax discount to Converge ICT. The company, however, denied receiving a 100% discount on ₱3.67 million waiver of penalties in 2022. In a second lawsuit lodged with the Ombudsman, Pasig resident Michelle Prudencio alleged Sotto, along with officers Manzanero, Elvira Flores, and Josephine Bagaoisan violated the Government Procurement Reform Act and the Anti-Graft and Corrupt Practices Act (R.A. 3019). The case stemmed from the alleged undistributed cash allowance for Pasig City Hall employees.

== Mayor of Pasig (since 2019) ==
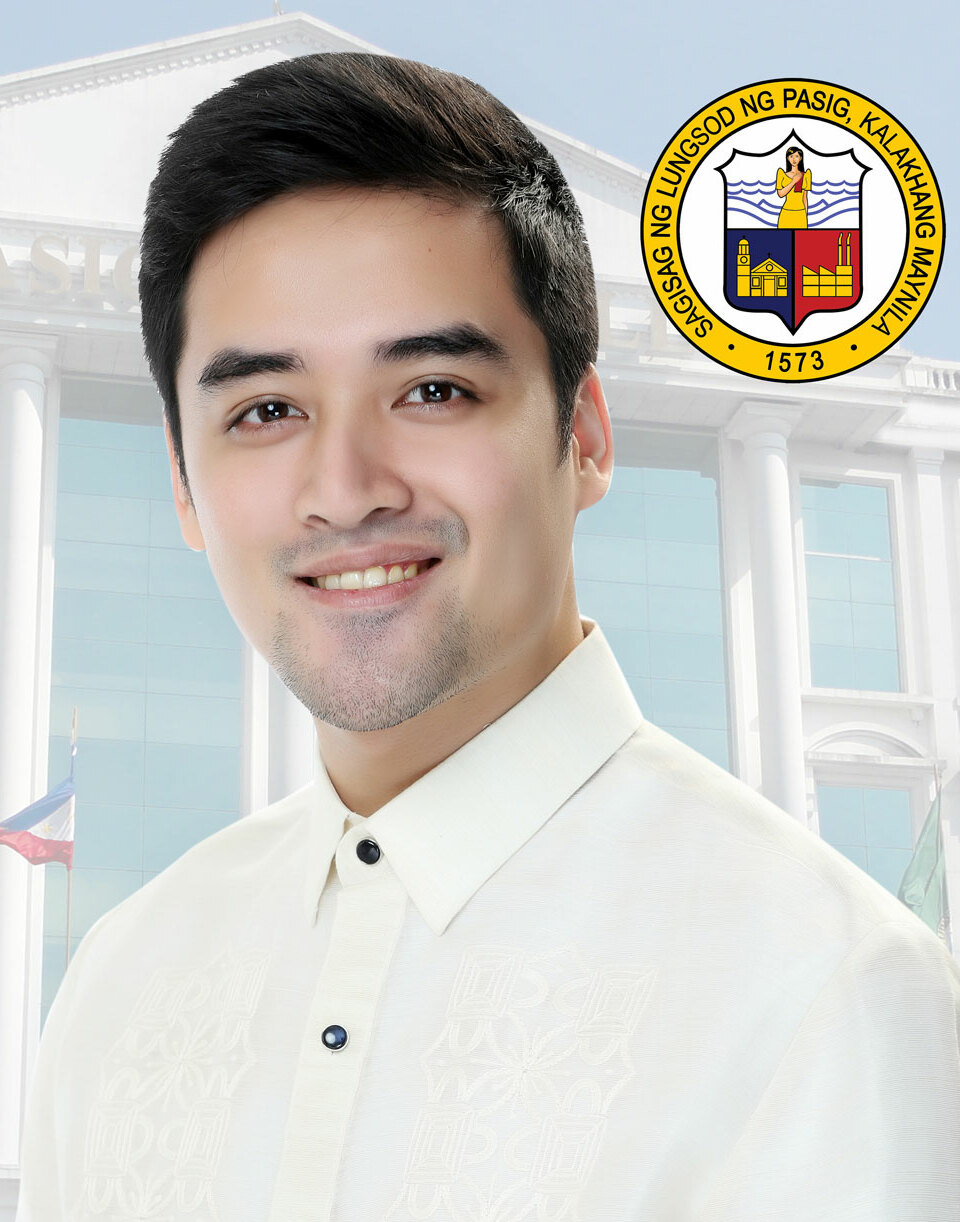
Official portrait, 2022

Sotto was sworn into office as the 12th mayor of Pasig on June 30, 2019. Sotto's first executive order upon being sworn in as Mayor was to put in place a Pasig City Traffic Management Task Force, which was tasked to "review and propose new solutions for the current mobility and traffic situation" within 45 days. The same executive order abolished the city's odd-even coding scheme, which the previous administration had implemented on top of the Metropolitan Manila Development Authority's Traffic Coding Scheme – a double burden which Sotto had earlier decried as being "disjointed and unjust."

=== Interventions in protests ===
On July 9, 2019, media reports noted that Sotto had visited protesters who were being forced away from their picket line in front of the main factory of Zagu Foods Corporation in Pasig. He reminded Zagu Foods' management that the protesters were within their rights to engage in protest activities.

In November 2019, Sotto intervened in another picket line incident – this time with Regent Foods Corporation, 23 of whose workers were arrested after they clashed with company security guards and police officers while protesting the company's labor practices. Sotto called on Regent to "rethink on the charges it filed against its employees," issuing a statement claiming that "These people are not criminals; they do not have the goal of hurting you. They are fighting for what they believe to be just." Sotto also said he was raising funds to bail out 23 arrested employees would need.

=== COVID-19 pandemic ===
Upon the report of the first local case of COVID-19 in Pasig on March 9, 2020, Sotto ordered city officials to implement the guidelines of the Department of Health and the World Health Organization in preventing the spread of the virus, including contact tracing, organizing response teams, disinfecting public spaces, and the cancellation of all public events and gatherings. He subsequently declared a state of calamity on March 15, following the confirmation of a fatality and six more cases.

Following the imposition of the enhanced community quarantine in Luzon, Sotto implemented a nightly curfew with safeguards for citizens' rights, penalties for hoarding essential goods, enabled rigorous disinfection efforts aided by drones, distributed welfare packages, and arranged for the conversion of private establishments as quarantine facilities. Sotto also maintained that city hall employees would remain paid during the lockdown, but the city government would operate on minimum staff to ensure the continuity of frontline services.

To prepare for the first school opening under the lockdown, Sotto raised P1.2 billion to provide tablets and laptops to its public school students in elementary, junior and senior high school, and their teachers.

==== Transportation initiatives during the Luzon quarantine ====
Sotto's administration also executed a number of transportation initiatives during the enhanced community quarantine. Most of these were generally praised, including the deployment of Pasig's fleet of buses to service essential workers, and the lending of "Pasig Bike Share" bicycle units to health workers and other frontline personnel.

One initiative that was questioned during the early days of the quarantine was that Pasig initially allowed limited tricycle trips for people with legitimate reasons to commute, such as chemotherapy and other health issues. This was done on the basis of Pasig risk analysis, which determined that more residents would experience more severe health complications if they were deprived of transport services. Sotto thus went on national media pleading to the national government that an exception be made for Pasig's tricycles, based on the studies. However, on March 19, 2020, the national government informed Sotto that they insisted all forms of public transport, including tricycles, would be banned. Sotto immediately responded that Pasig would stop allowing tricycles to ply their routes.

In response to media coverage of this, private companies began donating vehicles such as Community Managed Electric Transport (COMET) bus units to augment Pasig's fleet of free rides that can be offered to the public. The city was eventually able to acquire e-tricycles, which were specifically assigned to provide free transportation for Pasig residents who had health and hospitalization needs such as dialysis or chemotherapy – the residents which the risk assessment determined would be endangered by the ban on tricycles.

==== Tricycle operations dispute ====
On March 24, 2020, the Philippine legislature passed the Bayanihan to Heal as One Act which gave national government additional powers to combat the pandemic. The National Bureau of Investigation (NBI) invoked the said law on April 1, 2020 against Sotto, summoning him to appear at their office on April 7, claiming that he had violated the law's provision which bans public transportation. Sotto responded by claiming that he had complied with the national government's order to stop tricycle operations prior to the enactment of the law on March 25. Senate President Tito Sotto, an uncle of the mayor and a principal author of the law in question, supported his claim. Vice President Leni Robredo and Senator Francis Pangilinan were among the other politicians who questioned the NBI's actions, stating the unconstitutionality of criminalizing an act committed retroactively. Social media responded heavily with criticism towards the NBI for allegedly singling out the mayor, with the hashtag "#ProtectVico" trending on Twitter worldwide that day.

=== Crackdown on illegal POGO-related services ===
In February 2020, Sotto again gained positive media reactions as a result of his efforts to crack down on illegally-operating businesses linked to Philippine Offshore Gaming Operators (POGOs). On February 23, Sotto ordered the closure Fu Yuan Ji, a restaurant catering to POGO employees, which opened without securing a permit from the city to operate.

== Political positions ==
=== Politicking ===
Sotto received favorable press coverage when he issued a policy statement against the proliferation of political propaganda signages prior to his inauguration. A supporter had taken the occasion of Sotto's 30th Birthday on June 17 to post a tarpaulin greeting the Mayor-elect on his birthday. A few days later, Sotto went on Twitter to request that the tarpaulin be removed, and asserting that such politically oriented signage bearing his image would be discouraged during his term.

He has also made statements discouraging the "celebrity treatment" of politicians in the Philippines.

== Awards and recognition ==
In 2021, the United States Department of State recognized Sotto as one of 12 recipients of the International Anticorruption Champions Award for his efforts toward anti-corruption.

Also in 2021, he received The Outstanding Young Men (TOYM) Award. He was likewise named the People's Choice awardee and included in PeopleAsia's "People of the Year" 2021 list.

In 2022, Sotto was recognized as an Honorary Local Chief Executive of the Year by the Muslim Organization of Government and Private Executives (MOSLIV).

In 2025, Pasig City under Sotto's leadership became one of the winners of Bloomberg Philanthropies' Global Mayors Challenge, receiving a US$1 million grant for its floating parks initiative.

In 2025, Sotto was named to the Time 100 Next, Time's list of emerging leaders.

== Electoral history ==
Electoral history of Vico Sotto
Year	Office	Party		Votes received				Result	Ref.
Year	Office	Local	National	Total	%	P.	Swing	Result	Ref.
2016	Councilor (Pasig–1st district)	—N/a	Independent	85,677	—N/a	1st	—N/a	Won	
2019	Mayor of Pasig	—N/a	Aksyon	209,370	63.27%	1st	—N/a	Won	
2022	Mayor of Pasig	Giting ng Pasig	Aksyon	335,851	88.04%	1st	—N/a	Won	
2025	Mayor of Pasig	Giting ng Pasig	Independent	351,392	92.09%	1st	—N/a	Won	

Political offices
Preceded by Robert Eusebio	Mayor of Pasig; 2019–present	Incumbent
