= Ikaw ang Aking Mahal =

Single by VST & Company

from the album VST
- B-side: "Awitin Mo at Isasayaw Ko"
- Released: 1978
- Recorded: 1978
- Studio: Cinema Audio
- Genre: Manila sound
- Length: 3:18
- Label: Sunshine
- Composers: Vicente Sotto III, Spanky Rigor
- Lyricist: Joey de Leon

VST & Company singles chronology
"Ikaw ang Aking Mahal" (1978)	"Disco Fever" (1978)

"Ikaw ang Aking Mahal" ("You Are My Love") is a song by VST & Company. Its lyrics were penned by songwriter Joey de Leon while the music was composed by Tito Sotto and bassist Spanky Rigor. Released on their debut album VST, the ballad has been recorded by many other Filipino artists. The B-side, the disco number "Awitin Mo at Isasayaw Ko" ("You Sing and I'll Dance") is also one of the group's biggest hits. It is the last track on the group's debut album VST.

Sotto said in an interview with Arnold Clavio that the single became a monster hit to rival Boyfriends' "Dahil Mahal Kita" ("Because I Love You").

== Cover versions ==
- Malaysian band Alleycats recorded a Malay cover of the song entitled "Jika Kau Bercinta Lagi" (lit. "If You Ever Fall in Love Again") for their album Terima Kasih in 1978.
- Reggae band Brownman Revival recorded a reggae version of the song in 2005.
- Francis Magalona and Ciara Sotto recorded their version as a theme song from the 2006 Filipino supernatural horror film Txt.
- Daniel Padilla recorded his version on the 2015 album I Feel Good.
- Aiza Seguerra
- Noel Cabangon
