= Bobby Eusebio =

Filipino politician (born 1968)

9th and 11th Mayor of Pasig
- In office June 30, 2016 – June 30, 2019
- Vice Mayor: Iyo Bernardo
- Preceded by: Maribel Andaya-Eusebio
- Succeeded by: Vico Sotto
- In office June 30, 2007 – June 30, 2013
- Vice Mayor: Yoyong Martirez
- Preceded by: Vicente Eusebio
- Succeeded by: Maribel Andaya-Eusebio

Member of the Pasig City Council from the 2nd District
- In office June 30, 1998 – June 30, 2007

Personal details
- Born: Robert Cruz Eusebio; June 7, 1968 (age 58)
- Party: Independent (2021–present)
- Other political affiliations: Nacionalista (2008–2021); PMP (1998–2008)
- Spouse: Maribel Andaya
- Children: 1
- Parents: Vicente Eusebio (father); Soledad Eusebio (mother)
- Relatives: Ricky Eusebio (brother); Sarah Discaya (maternal cousin); Rolando Andaya Jr. (brother-in-law)

Robert "Bobby" Cruz Eusebio (born June 7, 1968), also known by his initials BCE, is a Filipino politician and architect who served as the mayor of Pasig from 2007 to 2013 and from 2016 until 2019.

== Political career ==
Eusebio began his political career when he won as first-placer Sangguniang Panlungsod member in the first district of Pasig in 1998, during the mayoralty of his father Vicente Eusebio.

Upon completing his three consecutive terms as councilor in 2007, he successfully ran for Mayor of Pasig under the banner of Pwersa ng Masang Pilipino, defeating outgoing congressman Robert Jaworski Jr. and succeeding his father. The early part of the election vote tally showed Jaworski leading, but was overtaken by Eusebio. Jaworski later promised to file a protest against Eusebio.

In 2016, he ran as Mayor of Pasig, and ran again in 2019 but lost to City Councilor Vico Sotto.
