= Ernesto Dela Peña =

Filipino composer and lyricist (1932–2024)

- Born: October 26, 1932; Paco, Manila, Philippine Islands
- Died: March 12, 2024 (aged 91)
- Occupations: Composer; Lyricist; Singer
- Labels: Hidcor Recording Co. Vicor Records; Star Music (music rights)
- Formerly of: Ermar Duet

Ernesto Dela Peña (October 26, 1932 – March 12, 2024) was a Filipino composer and lyricist.

== Early life ==
Dela Peña was born on October 26, 1932, in Paco, Manila.

== Career ==
Dela Peña would start his career as a recording artist at Hidcor Recording Co. in 1956. He initially sang kundiman songs before shifting to being a lyricist. He would then work for Vicor Records for 30 years. In 2018 he would become associated with Star Music, a recording company owned by the Philippine media conglomerate ABS-CBN Corporation.

He would write at least 300 songs. Among the singers he wrote songs for was Rico J. Puno; this includes the 1978 song "May Bukas Pa" and 1979 Metro Manila Popular Music Festival entry "Lupa" both of which he wrote with Charo Unite.

He made songs for various artists such as Sharon Cuneta, Bibeth Orteza, Sylvia La Torre, and Bobby Gonzales as well as bands like VST & Company.

Dela Peña was a co-composer of the 1986 Virna Lisa song "Magkaisa".

As a singer, he was part of Ermar Duet with Mar Lopez (a member of the group Big 3 Sullivans with Apeng Daldal and Boy Sullivan) under VIP Records. The duo released the albums Hibok-Hibok (1970), Pinagbigyan (1970), and Haring Solomon (1989) in the 1970s. Consisting of novelty and slightly adult-based folk rock songs and controversially having the first two albums feature a nude model in both the front and back cover even though they are stamped as “FOR ADULT LISTENING ONLY.” or “FOR ADULTS ONLY.” (the first album (Hibok-Hibok) featured adult model Cristy Aragon for both the front cover (in color, covered in a psychedelic-like image via a projector light) and the back cover (in black and white); the second album's (Pinagbigyan) front cover featured a nude woman looking behind her shoulder while the duo posed in shirtless and black pants in either side of her legs and the back cover featured a close up of a woman’s side nipple while the duo "climbed" into it), the duo became famous for their songs "Baha", "Hibok-Hibok", "Kuryente", "Tabo", "Tayo'y Magkantahan", "Pinagbigyan", and the 1975 track "Open City (Ang Maynila)" (also known simply as "Open City"), which tells the story of the Japanese invasion in the Philippines during World War II, particularly the Japanese invasion of Luzon, the fall of Bataan and Corregidor, and the retreat of Filipino and American forces.

== Death ==
Dela Peña died on March 12, 2024, due to a lingering illness.
