= Yoyong Martirez =

Filipino basketball player (1946–2024)

6th Vice Mayor of Pasig
- In office June 30, 2004 – June 30, 2013
- Mayor: Vicente Eusebio (2004–2007); Robert Eusebio (2007–2013)
- Preceded by: Lorna Bernardo
- Succeeded by: Iyo Christian Bernardo

Member of the Pasig City Council from the 2nd District
- In office June 30, 2013 – June 30, 2022
- In office June 30, 1995 – June 30, 2004

Personal details
- Born: Rosalio Dy Martires; September 9, 1946 Catbalogan, Samar, Philippines
- Died: June 18, 2024 (aged 77) Makati, Philippines
- Party: Nacionalista
- Spouse: Teresita Martires (m. 1975)
- Children: 5
- Education: Southwestern University
- Basketball career

Personal information
- Listed height: 5 ft 8 in (1.73 m)

Career information
- College: Southwestern University
- Position: Guard
- Number: 14

Career history
- 1972–1982: San Miguel Braves/Royal Tru-Orange/San Miguel Beermen
- 1983–1984: Manhattan/ Sunkist/Winston/Country Fair

Career highlights
- 2× PBA champion (1979 Open, 1982 Invitational)
Medals
Men's basketball
Representing Philippines
ABC Championship
| Silver medal – second place | 1971 Tokyo | Team |
| Gold medal – first place | 1973 Manila | Team |

Rosalio Dy Martires (September 9, 1946 – June 18, 2024), also known as Yoyong Martirez, was a Filipino basketball player, actor, politician and comedian. He was the 6th Vice Mayor of Pasig.

== Early life ==
Yoyong Martirez was born on September 9, 1946 in Catbalogan when Samar province was still undivided. He later moved to Cebu where he pursued his high school and college studies. He attended Southwestern University in Cebu City.

== Basketball career ==
Martires played for the team of Southwestern University in Cebu City prior to getting scouted by the San Miguel Beermen.

He moved to Manila after joining San Miguel, which played in the Manila Industrial and Commercial Athletic Association and the Philippine Basketball Association between 1972 and 1982.

He also played for Winston and Country Fair from 1983 to 1984.

== National team ==
In 1972, he participated in the Olympic Games in Munich, Germany as a member of the Philippine national basketball team. He was a fleet-footed guard specializing in steals/interceptions and assists.

He was part of the national team which won gold in the 1973 ABC Championship (now the FIBA Asia Cup) which was hosted in Manila.

== Acting career ==
Martirez also became a film actor often fulfilling the roles of sidekick characters in portrayals to films which starred Tito Sotto, Vic Sotto and Joey de Leon.

He appeared in the television programs Iskul Bukol from the late 1970s and in John en Marsha in the 1980s. His feature film debut was in the 1985 film Ma'am May We Go Out? which starred the Sotto–de Leon comedic trio.

Martirez's acting career overlapped the latter years of his basketball career which ended in 1982. He also appeared in later television shows such as Pepito Manaloto, My Darling Aswang and Daddy's Gurl in the 2010s.

== Political career ==
Martires was as a local politician and public servant in Pasig for 27 years.

=== City Councilor of Pasig (1995–2004) ===
He served his first term as councillor from 1995 to 2004. During this time, he co-authored a number of landmark local ordinances such as that for the creation and establishment of the Pamantasan ng Lungsod ng Pasig, the Pasig City General Hospital, and the Pasig City Children's Hospital.

=== Vice Mayor of Pasig (2004–2013) ===
He was elected Vice Mayor in 2004 and served until 2013. As the presiding officer of the Sangguniang Panlungsod ng Pasig, he oversaw the passage of local ordinances such as that for the establishment of the Pasig City Science High School, the creation of the Pasig City Disaster Risk Reduction and Management Office, and the enactment of the Gender and Development Code of Pasig City.

=== City Councilor of Pasig (2013–2022) ===
In 2013, he was again elected as a councilor for the second district and served until 2022. As the Chairman of the Sangguniang Panlungsod ng Pasig's Committee on Health when the COVID-19 pandemic hit the country, Martirez principally authored various legislative measures aimed at mitigating the spread of the virus and strengthening the delivery of health services by the local government. This includes the ordinance which established the Pasig City Health Department.

== Death ==
Martirez died on June 18, 2024 at Makati Medical Center. He was 77. His death was linked to complications from pneumonia. He was buried at The Heritage Memorial Park in Taguig on June 23, 2024.

== Filmography ==
=== Film ===
| Year | Title | Role |
|---|---|---|
| 1985 | Ma'am May We Go Out? | Teacher |
| 1988 | Love Letters | Chauffeur (episode 2: "Invisible Lover") |
| 1988 | Sheman: Mistress of the Universe | Kabo |
| 1988 | Jockey T'yan | |
| 1989 | M & M the Incredible Twins | Coach |
| 1989 | Starzan 2: The Coming of Star Son | |
| 1989 | SuperMouse and the Robo-Rats | Junior |
| 1990 | Starzan III: The Jungle Triangle | |
| 1990 | Twist: Ako si Ikaw, Ikaw si Ako | Pare |
| 1990 | Crocodile Jones: The Son of Indiana Dundee | |
| 1991 | Alyas: Batman en Robin | |
| 1992 | Okay Ka, Fairy Ko! Part 2 | |
| 1992 | Ang Tange Kong Pag-ibig | De Niro |
| 1992 | Ano Ba Yan? | Johnson |
| 1993 | Ano Ba Yan? Part 2 | Johnson |
| 1993 | Ang Kuya Kong Siga | |
| 1993 | Pandoy: Ang Alalay ng Panday | Pendong |
| 1994 | Tunay na Magkaibigan, Walang Iwanan...Peksman | Sgt. Jose |
| 1994 | Once Upon a Time in Manila | Dong |
| 1994 | Hindi Pa Tapos ang Labada, Darling | |
| 1995 | Isang Kahig, Tatlong Tuka: Daddy Ka Na, Mommy Ka Pa! | |
| 1996 | Enteng and the Shaolin Kid | Martin |
| 1996 | Lab en Kisses | Dodong |
| 1997 | Wow, Multo! | Sgt. Durano |
| 1999 | Basta't Ikaw, Nanginginig Pa | |
| 1999 | Oo Na, Mahal na Kung Mahal | Enad's father |
| 2002 | Bestman: 4 Better, Not 4 Worse | Himself |
| 2003 | Utang na Ama | Konsehal |
| 2013 | The Fighting Chefs | |

=== Television ===
- Iskul Bukol (1977–1989) – guest
- John en Marsha (1985–1990) – guest
- Family 3 Plus 1 (1985)
- Goin' Bananas (1986–1987; 1987–1991)
- Plaza 1899 (1987) – guest
- TODAS (1985-1988) – guest
- Hapi House (1988) – guest
- Four Da Boys (1989) – guest
- Home Along Da Riles (1992–2003)
- Purungtong (1993) – guest
- Rock and Roll 2000 (ABC, 1993)
- Mixed N.U.T.S. (1994–1997)
- Eat Bulaga! (1994) – guest
- Okay Ka Fairy Ko: The Sitcom (1995–1997)
- Wow Mali! (ABC, 1996–2006)
- 1 for 3 (1997–2002) – guest
- The Buzz (1999–2015) – guest
- Super Klenk (2000) – guest
- Daddy Di Do Du (2002–2007) – guest
- Home Along Da Airport (2003–2005)
- Fulhaus (2007–2013) – guest
- S-Files (2008–2015)
- Talentadong Pinoy (2009–2014) – guest celebrity judge
- Show Me the Manny (2009)
- Star Confessions (2010)
- The Jose and Wally Show Starring Vic Sotto (2011)
- My Darling Aswang (2011)
- Pidol's Wonderland (2012)
- Celebrity Samurai (2013)
- Mars (GMA News TV, 2014–2019) – guest
- Pepito Manaloto (2015)
- Sabado Badoo (2015)
- No Harm, No Foul (2015)
- Vampire ang Daddy Ko (2015–2018) – guest
- Dear Uge (2016)
- Bossing & Ai (2018)
- Tunay na Buhay (2019)
- Daddy's Gurl (2020)
- Mars Pa More (2020)
- Oh My Dad! (2020)
- Chika Besh (2020)
- Fill in the Bank (2021)
- John en Ellen! (2021)
- Bawal na Game Show (2021)

Political offices
| Preceded by Lorna Bernardo | Vice Mayor of Pasig; 2004–2013 | Succeeded by Iyo Bernardo |
