= Val Sotto =

Filipino actor, singer, composer and politician

The Honorable Valmar "Val" C. Sotto

Member of the Parañaque City Council from the 2nd district
- In office June 30, 2004 – June 30, 2013

Personal details
- Born: Valmar Castelo Sotto; March 23, 1945 (age 81) Manila, Philippine Commonwealth
- Party: Independent (2004–2007, 2013–present)
- Other political affiliations: NPC (2007–2013)
- Spouse: Theresa Marco (m. 1969)
- Relations: Tito Sotto (brother); Vic Sotto (brother); Maru Sotto (brother)
- Children: 4 (including Wahoo)
- Parent(s): Marcelino Antonio "Nonong" O. Sotto Sr. (father); Herminia Castelo-Sotto (mother)
- Occupation: Actor, singer, politician
- Profession: Actor

Valmar "Val" Castelo Sotto (Tagalog pronunciation: [ˈsɔtɔ]; born March 23, 1945) is a Filipino actor, singer, composer, and comedian. He was one of the lead vocalists of the Filipino band VST & Company. He appeared as the lead actor in Agila, which aired from 1987 to 1992 on RPN and ABS-CBN and produced by TAPE Inc.

== Personal life ==
Sotto is a great-nephew of former Senator Filemon Sotto and grandson of former Senator Vicente Sotto of Cebu City, Philippines. He is the eldest brother of Senator Tito Sotto, Marcelino Antonio "Maru" Sotto Jr. (former husband of actress Ali Carag-Sotto) and Vic Sotto. He is an uncle of actresses and actors Ciara Sotto, Danica Sotto-Pingris, Oyo Sotto and the late Miko Sotto. He has been married to Theresa Marco-Sotto since December 14, 1969 and the couple have four children (including Viktor Eriko "Wahoo", the councilor of Parañaque) and 7 grandchildren.

== Political career ==
He served as a councilor in the second district of Parañaque from 2004 to 2013.

== Filmography ==
=== Film ===
- Swing It... Baby! (1979)
- Rock Baby, Rock (1979)
- D'Gradwets (1981)
- Alexandra (1985)
- Super Wan-Tu-Tri (1985)
- Send In The Clowns (1986)
- Shoot That Ball (1987)
- Ready!... Aim!... Fire!... (1987)
- Knock, Knock Who's There? (1988)
- Fly Me To The Moon (1988)
- Tangga and Chos: Beauty Secret Agents (1990)
- The Return Of The Long Ranger & Tonton: How The West Was Wrong (1992)
- Ligaw-ligawan, Kasal-kasalan, Bahay-bahayan (1993)
- Pandoy: Alalay Ng Panday (1993)
- Once Upon A Time In Manila (1994)
- Ang Tipong Kong Lalake (1995)
- Basta't Ikaw... Nanginginig Pa (1999)
- Lastikman (2003)
- Mr. Suave: Hoy! Hoy! Hoy! Hoy! Hoy! Hoy! (2003)
- Enteng Ng Ina Mo (2011)
- Si Agimat at Si Enteng Kabisote (2013)

=== Television ===
- OK Lang (1975–1977)
- Iskul Bukol (1977–1989)
- Lovingly Yours, Helen (1984–1992)
- Regal Shockers The Series (1985)
- The Dawn & Jimmy Show (1986–1989) - guest
- Agila (1987–1992)
- Okay Ka, Fairy Ko! (1987–1997)
- T.O.D.A.S.: Television's Outrageously Delightful All-Star Show (1981–1989)
- TVJ: Television Jesters (1989–1992)
- Rock En Roll 2000 (1992–1993)
- TVJ on 5 (1993–1994)
- Eat Bulaga! (1994)
- Mixed N.U.T.S. (1994–1997)
- Haybol Rambol (1995)
- ASAP Natin 'To (1995–2020) - guest
- Wow Mali (1996–2008)
- Rio Del Mar (1999–2001)
- Super Klenk (2000)
- 1 for 3 (2000)
- Back To Iskul Bukol (2001)
- Daddy Di Do Du (2002–2007)
- Bubble Gang (2005)
- Ful Haus (2008) - guest
- Who Wants to Be a Millionaire? (2009–2015) - guest
- Pepito Manaloto (2010) - guest
- Wow Mali Pa Rin (2011) - guest
- The Jose & Wally Show Starring Vic Sotto (2011–2012) - guest
- Celebrity Samurai (2012) - guest
- Vampire ang Daddy Ko (2013)
- Mars (2014–2019) - guest
- Sabado Badoo (2015)
- Tunay na Buhay (2017)
- Bossing & Ai (2017)
- Daddy's Gurl (2018)
- Mars Pa More (2020) - guest
- E.A.T. (2023) - guest

== See also ==
- Tito Sotto
- Vic Sotto
- Joey de Leon
- Parañaque
