= VST & Company =

Filipino disco band

- Origin: Manila, Philippines
- Genres: Manila sound; OPM; pop; disco
- Years active: 1978–1983
- Labels: Vicor; Star (music rights)
- Past members: See personnel
- Website: officialvst.com

VST & Company was a Filipino disco and Manila Sound band active from 1978 to 1983 under Vicor Music Corporation. Originally formed by Tito Sotto, Vic Sotto, and Spanky Rigor, the group became one of the defining acts of the Manila Sound movement and played a significant role in the popularization of disco music in the Philippines during the late 1970s and early 1980s. Its best-known lineup included Spanky Rigor, Roger Rigor, Male Rigor, Monet Gaskell, Celso Llarina, Val Sotto, and Jun Medina.

The band originated from a project conceived by Tito Sotto, then an A&R manager at Vicor Music, in collaboration with Vic Sotto and lyricist Joey de Leon. Its debut single paired "Ikaw ang Aking Mahal" with the B-side "Awitin Mo at Isasayaw Ko" (both 1978), the latter becoming the group's breakthrough hit after receiving greater radio airplay. The success of its self-titled debut album, VST (1978), which earned gold certification, helped establish the band's nationwide popularity during a period known as "VST Mania".

Between 1978 and 1983, VST & Company released five studio albums, recorded numerous hit songs, and appeared in three feature films before concluding its public activities following the nationwide Coca-Cola "Coke Litro" Tour. The band's recordings, particularly "Awitin Mo at Isasayaw Ko", remain closely associated with the Manila Sound movement and the development of Filipino popular music.

== History ==
=== 1978: Creation and breakthrough ===
In a 2019 ABS-CBN YouTube interview for ASAP featuring Manila Sound music, Monet Gaskell said that 1970s Philippine radio stations were required to play at least one Filipino song per hour, helping Original Pilipino Music (OPM) surpass foreign LP sales and gain wider popularity. Fellow member Male Rigor recalled that Tito Sotto, then with Vicor Music, recognized the potential for a new local group after hearing a waitress hum a song by The Boyfriends, who were signed under OctoArts. Sotto believed that the Boyfriends' song "Dahil Mahal Kita" (1978) was influenced by the Bee Gees, prompting him to create a rival song with an even stronger Bee Gees-inspired sound. He composed the melody for the band's debut single, "Ikaw Ang Aking Mahal" (1978), while Joey de Leon wrote the lyrics. Anticipating that the single's B-side would feature a disco track, Sotto later asked his brother, Vic Sotto, to compose a song inspired by the 1977 film Saturday Night Fever, noting that the Boyfriends had not yet released a disco record.

The concept materialized with the formation of VST & Company. According to arranger Lorrie Ilustre, Tito Sotto, then A&R manager at Vicor Music Corporation, requested an urgent recording to compete with a rival release. Ilustre worked with Vic Sotto and Joey de Leon on "Awitin Mo at Isasayaw Ko" (1978), with de Leon writing the lyrics and Sotto composing the melody. He arranged the track with session musicians Jun Regalado (drums), Roger Herrera Jr. (bass), and Celso Llarina (guitars), completing the orchestration in Davao before finalizing the horn, string sections, and production in Manila. Tito and Vic Sotto were the band's original dubbers, while Spanky Rigor was brought in for falsetto parts.

The single was initially released with "Ikaw ang Aking Mahal" as the A-side, but radio stations favored the B-side, "Awitin Mo at Isasayaw Ko", which became a major hit and propelled VST & Company to prominence in the late 1970s OPM and Manila Sound scene. Their debut album, VST (1978), quickly earned gold certification and helped popularize disco music in the Philippines, fueling a period known as "VST Mania" as the group rapidly gained nationwide popularity. Their first major concert at Cebu Coliseum in Cebu City, was themed "Galactica"; meant to celebrate the box office popularity of the sci-fi epic, Star Wars: A New Hope. The band's primary members wore Darth Vader masks and matching black capes. The aftermath of the highly successful concert reflected band's immediate impact on Philippine pop culture.

According to Tito Sotto, television promotion remained necessary despite the song's strong sales, as TV shows sought appearances by VST & Company. Since he and Vic Sotto were reluctant to take on major on-screen roles, a television lineup was formed with Vic Sotto, Spanky Rigor, and Celso Llarina. Roger Rigor, Male Rigor, Val Sotto, Monett Gaskell, and Jun Medina were recruited to lip-sync during television appearances, while the original studio musicians handled live performances.

=== 1982–1983: Leaving the spotlight: "Coke Litro" Tour ===
As the disco decade came to a close, VST & Company's last performance and public appearance as a band, would be during the nationwide Coca-Cola "Coke Litro" Tour. The promotional concert tour lasted an entire year, from 1982 to 1983. At the time the band quietly exited the entertainment industry, they had already completed five full-length albums filled with double platinum hits, and made three feature films.

== Name ==
In an August 2024 interview on Chinkee Tan's YouTube channel, Tito Sotto recalled that the group's name was chosen after recording "Awitin Mo at Isasayaw Ko" and "Ikaw ang Aking Mahal" (both 1978). Inspired by MFSB, whose name used initials, he adopted "VST" from Vicente Sotto the Third, a name he had used during his time with Vicor Music. To avoid implying sole ownership, he said the initials also represented Vic Sotto and Spanky Rigor, while "Company" referred to the rhythm section that performed on the original studio recordings.

== Legacy and cultural impact ==
Ballet Philippines (2016)

For its 2016 holiday season presentation, the Cultural Center of the Philippines premiered "Awitin Mo at Isasayaw Ko" on December 2, 2016. The dance musical, a collaboration between Ballet Philippines and ABS-CBN with the ABS-CBN Philharmonic Orchestra conducted by Gerard Salonga, celebrated the music of VST & Company. The libretto was written by Bibeth Orteza, with choreography by Carissa Adea, James Laforteza, and PJ Rebullida, and direction by Ballet Philippines artistic director Paul Alexander Morales. The production featured Karylle, Michael Pangilinan, Markki Stroem, Kyle Echarri, Cooky Chua, Sandino Martin, Jef Flores, and Noel Comia Jr.

Awit Award honors (2017)

VST & Company's contributions to Philippine music were recognized when they received the "Dangal ng Musikang Pilipino" award at the 30th Awit Awards, presented by the Philippine Association of the Record Industry on November 26, 2017.

Millennials Embrace the Music (2017)

In December 2017, the Adamson University Pep Squad won the UAAP Cheerdance Competition with a routine set to the music of VST & Company at the Mall of Asia Arena. Male Rigor later joined the celebration at the Adamson University campus in Manila, performing "Awitin Mo at Isasayaw Ko" during the victory bonfire.

ASAP Natin 'To Celebrates 40 Years of VST & Company

To celebrate VST & Company's 40th anniversary, ABS-CBN's longest-running Sunday noontime show, ASAP Natin 'To, opened their February 16, 2020, episode with a full musical tribute to VST & Company. The variety show's stars performed rearranged renditions VST hits: Gary Valenciano opened the show with "Magsayawan", followed by Zsa Zsa Padilla performing "Awitin Mo at Isasayaw Ko", along with Elha Nympha, Zephanie and Janine Berdin. Ogie Alcasid performed "Step No, Step Yes", Martin Nievera and Billy Crawford did "Rock Baby, Rock". And for the finale, the entire cast closed with "Magsayawan".

== Appearances and live performances ==
TVJ, Eat Bulaga! "Dabarkads" (2015)

- August 2015, Tito Sotto, Vic Sotto, and Joey de Leon performed "Kiss Kiss", "Ipagpatawad mo", and "Rock Baby Rock" on Eat Bulaga!.

Disco Manila (2016)

- August 13, 2016: Spanky and Roger Rigor, along with Jet Montelibano of Music and Magic and the Sounds of Manila band, headlined "Disco Manila", as part of the Grand Performances Outdoor Summer Series in Downton Los Angeles; curated by DJ and host Joel Quizon, nephew of comedian Dolphy.

NYU Abu Dhabi (2016)

- In October 2016, Spanky and Roger Rigor performed in New York University Abu Dhabi with the members of "Disco Manila". The university extended an Artist-in-Residence invitation to the two US-based members of VST & Company.

Stanford University (2018)

- In April 2018, Spanky and Roger Rigor performed at Stanford University's Stanford Live performance series at the renowned Bing Concert Hall. Accompanied by the Union Band, the show was a first for a Filipino act at the famed venue.

Ernst Community Cultural Center, Northern Virginia Community College (2018)

- In April 2018, Spanky, Roger Rigor, and Lorrie Ilustre performed at Ernst Community Cultural Center of the Northern Virginia Community College in Annandale, Virginia.

== Personnel ==
Credits adapted from Lorie Illustre, Tito Sotto, and the VST Vol. album credits.

Session musicians

- Lorie Illustre – keyboards
- Jun Regalado – drums
- Roger Herrera Jr. – bass
- Celso Llarina – guitars, lead vocals
- Tito Sotto – lead vocals
- Vic Sotto – lead vocals
- Spanky Rigor – bass, vocals
- Danny Bornilla
- Boy Alcaide – drums
- Homer Flores
- Filicom Productions – orchestra
- Toti Fuentes
- Wilfredo Concepcion – brass
- Benjamin Concepcion – brass
- Claude Baria – brass
- Romeo San Jose – brass
- Benjamin Bautista – strings
- Benny Reyes – strings
- Marlene Aviguetero – strings
- Bimbim Villaflor – strings
- Alberto Leonor – strings
- Racelito Carmelotes – strings
- Luisito Obtinario – strings
- Adelaida Perez – strings
- Sancho Samala – strings
- Eloy Prospero – strings
- Modesto Maiquez – strings
- Terry Decena – strings
- Felicitias Ronquillo – strings
- Johnny Cruz – strings
- Fred Concepcion – strings

Performing lineup

- Roger Rigor – vocals
- Male Rigor – keyboards
- Monet Gaskell – guitars, keyboards, vocals
- Val Sotto – guitar, vocals
- Jun Medina – drums, vocals

== Discography ==
- VST (1978)
- VST 2 (1978)
- Boogie Woogie Christmas Day (1979)
- VST 3 (1979)
- VST 4 (1980)

== Filmography ==
During the late 1970s, Filipino director Al Quinn directed two feature films that showcased the songs of VST & Company as the films' soundtrack: Disco Fever (1978), starring Vilma Santos, Christopher de Leon, and Cocoy Laurel; and Swing It, Baby (1979), that top-billed Vilma Santos and Romeo Vasquez, with Tito, Vic and Joey, and other stars of the decade such as Amy Austria, Walter Navarro, Rolly Quizon, Sandy Garcia, Geleen Eugenio, Bing Davao and Mike Monserrat. It was in this film that VST & Company made their big-screen debut.

Feature films
Year	Title	Director	Starring
1978	Disco Fever	Al Quinn	Vilma Santos, Christopher De Leon, and Cocoy Laurel
1979	Swing It, Baby	Al Quinn	Romeo Vasquez, Vilma Santos, with Tito Sotto, Vic Sotto and Joey De Leon
1979	Rock Baby, Rock	Oscar Miranda	Vilma Santos, Júnior, with Tito Sotto, Vic Sotto, and Joey De Leon
