= Vic Sotto =

Filipino actor and comedian (born 1954)

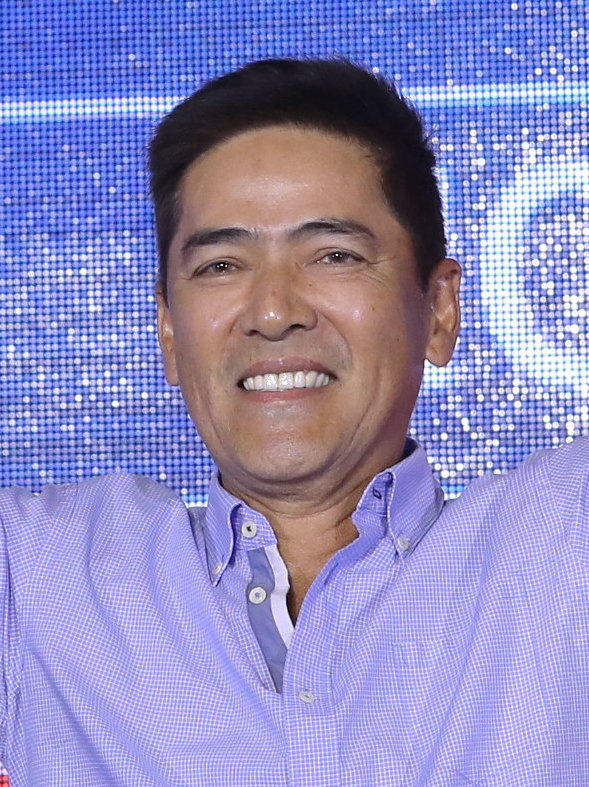
- Sotto in 2022
- Born: Marvic Valentin Castelo Sotto; April 28, 1954 (age 72); Manila, Philippines
- Other name: Bossing
- Occupations: Actor; comedian; television presenter; producer
- Years active: 1975–present
- Television: Intercontinental Broadcasting Corporation (1986–1989); ABS-CBN (1989–1995); GMA Network (1995–2024); TV5 Network (2009–2015, 2023–present)
- Spouses: Dina Bonnevie (m. 1982; ann. 1992); Pauleen Luna (m. 2016)
- Children: 6, including Oyo Boy and Vico
- Relatives: Sotto family

Marvic Valentin "Vic" Castelo Sotto (born April 28, 1954), popularly known as Bossing, is a Filipino actor, comedian, television presenter, and producer. Active in Philippine film and television since the 1970s, he is known for his comedic roles in sitcoms and films. He is also one of the original hosts of Eat Bulaga!, alongside his elder brother Tito Sotto and Joey de Leon.

Sotto began his career in the 1970s as a member of the disco band VST & Company, contributing to hit songs such as "Ikaw ang Aking Mahal", "Awitin Mo at Isasayaw Ko", "Magsayawan", and “Rock Baby Rock". He later formed the trio TVJ with his brother Tito and Joey de Leon; the group starred in the long-running sitcom Iskul Bukol (1978–1988). Since 1979, Sotto has hosted the noontime variety show Eat Bulaga! He is also a co-founder of TVJ Productions, which continued producing Eat Bulaga! after departing from the original production company, TAPE Inc..

Sotto has appeared in several sitcoms, including Okay Ka, Fairy Ko! (1987–1997), Daddy Di Do Du (2001–2007), Ful Haus (2007–2009), Vampire ang Daddy Ko (2013–2016), Hay, Bahay! (2016–2017), Daddy's Gurl (2018–2023), and Open 24/7 (2023–2024). In film, he portrayed the title role in the Enteng Kabisote series (1991–2016). His other notable films include Lastikman (2003), Ang Darling Kong Aswang (2009), My Little Bossings (2013), Jack Em Popoy: The Puliscredibles (2018), and Mission Unstapabol: The Don Identity (2019). He has also hosted television programs such as Who Wants to Be a Millionaire? (2009–2015), and Bossing & Ai (2017–2018).

== Early life and background ==
Marvic Valentin Castelo Sotto was born on April 28, 1954, to Marcelino Antonio "Nonong" Ojeda Sotto and Herminia Castelo Sotto. He has three brothers: Val Sotto (b. 1945), Tito Sotto (b. 1948), and Marcelino Antonio Sotto Jr. (b. 1951). He finished his secondary education at Colegio de San Juan de Letran.

Sotto lived for many years in Cabanatuan City, Nueva Ecija. In 2017, he was honored as Ang Natatanging Anak ng Kabanatuan (ANAK) by the city government during the annual Banatu Festival, in recognition of his contributions to the Philippine entertainment industry. The award held special significance for Sotto, who stated in his speech that he spent half of his life in Cabanatuan.

== Career ==
Before gaining recognition in the 1970s, Sotto began as a singer and guitarist at Vicor Music Corporation, where his brother Tito Sotto also worked. His debut solo album with the label was successful. He later formed VST & Company with his brothers Tito and Val, which produced dance hits such as "Awitin Mo at Isasayaw Ko" and "Rock, Baby, Rock" (1978). He later joined the gag show OK Lang on IBC 13, where he formed a trio with his brother Tito and comedian Joey de Leon, known as TVJ. The group subsequently rose to prominence on the GMA Network variety shows Discorama (1975–1977) and Student Canteen (1975–1986) and gained their largest television following through the hit sitcom Iskul Bukol (1978–1988). This success led to their selection as hosts of Eat Bulaga! (1979–present), the longest-running noontime variety show on Philippine television.

=== Other ventures ===
Sotto is a product endorser. In 2024, he was the first and only official brand ambassador of PlayTime PH, a licensed online gambling corporation. Sotto also produced films and television programs under his production company, M-Zet Productions. These include Okay Ka, Fairy Ko! (1987–1997), 1 for 3 (1997–2001), Daddy Di Do Du (2001–2007), Ful Haus (2007–2009), Vampire ang Daddy Ko (2013–2016), Hay, Bahay! (2016–2017), Daddy’s Gurl (2018–2023), and Open 24/7 (2023–2024).

== Personal life ==
Sotto married Dina Bonnevie in 1982, and they had two children: Danica (born 1983) and Oyo (born 1984). The couple separated in 1986, and their marriage was annulled in 1992. Actress Coney Reyes joined Eat Bulaga! in 1982–1991 as a replacement for Chiqui Hollmann. During her tenure, she had a relationship with Sotto, and they had a son, politician Vico Sotto (b. 1989). Angela Luz was a former leading lady of Sotto in the television series Okay Ka, Fairy Ko!; they began a relationship after his separation from Coney Reyes. Luz later gave birth to Vic Sotto's fourth child, Paulina. Sotto had a relationship with fellow Eat Bulaga! co-host Pia Guanio in the 2000s.

He later married actress Pauleen Luna, also an Eat Bulaga! co-host. They have a 34-year age gap. The couple wed on January 30, 2016, at Saint James the Great Parish Church in Ayala, Alabang, and have two daughters.

== Controversies ==
=== Pepsi Paloma gang rape case ===
In 1982, the 15-year-old actress Pepsi Paloma accused Sotto and fellow comedians Joey de Leon and Richie D'Horsie of gang raping and taking photos of her on June 21 in a room at the Sulo Hotel in Quezon City. On July 31, Paloma's manager Rey Dela Cruz lodged a formal complaint with Defense Minister Juan Ponce Enrile. On August 18, Paloma filed charges of rape and acts of lasciviousness against the three television personalities before the Quezon City fiscal's office. The crime of rape at the time, carried the death penalty in the Philippines, and to prevent his brother from being sent to the electric chair, Tito Sotto quickly went to see Paloma while she was still securing the services of attorney Rene Cayetano. According to Paloma, Tito Sotto pressured her into signing an "Affidavit of Desistance" to drop the rape charges against his brother and cohorts—Tito Sotto had allegedly placed a pistol on the table in front of Paloma when he went to talk to her.

In exchange for the dismissal of the charges of rape, Vic Sotto, de Leon and D'Horsie issued a public apology to Paloma:

We hope that you will not allow the error we have committed against you to stand as a stumbling block to that future which we all look forward to. We therefore ask you to find it in your heart to pardon us for the wrong which we have done against you.

Despite the suspects' earlier apology, Tito Sotto has maintained his position against any involvement in the whitewashing of the rape case and alleges that the scandal was a gimmick by Paloma's party for publicity. Again, in spite of a live apology issued to the people, Sotto said that he was not involved as a perpetrator in the rape of Paloma and he denied using his position in government to influence the court decision. Sotto became Vice Mayor in Quezon City in 1988 before being elected as a Senator in 1992. In 2018, Sotto requested The Philippine Inquirer to remove published articles available online mentioning the Pepsi Paloma Case, claiming them to be "fake news" and damaging to his current reputation as a Senator.

In May 1985, Paloma was found dead in an apparent suicide, though evidence suggests this was actually murder in order to prevent her from testifying against Sotto in court. Dela Cruz was murdered years later.

In January 2025, a Muntinlupa Regional Trial Court granted Sotto's petition and issued a writ of habeas data. The prerogative writ ordered the censorship of portions of the Pepsi Paloma promotional teaser trailer and at the same time required respondent Darryl Yap to submit an answer. On Cristy FerMinute, lawyer Enrique "Buko" V. Dela Cruz Jr. said that Sotto's daughter was bullied in school because of Yap's alleged defamation. Sotto thereafter filed 19 cyber libel cases against Yap with the Muntinlupa Court, regarding the showing of The Rapists of Pepsi Paloma teaser trailer which mentioned Sotto's name. On January 24, the Court ordered Yap to delete his 26-second teaser video from all online video platforms and social media.

== Filmography ==
=== Film ===
Year	Title	Role
1979	Swing It Baby	Vic
1979	Rock Baby Rock	Vic
1979	Mang Kepweng	Tres Dwendes
1979	Mamang Sorbetero	Ariston
1980	Ako, Ikaw...Magkaagaw	Greggy
1980	Mr. One-Two-Three	Toto
1980	Iskul Bukol	Vic Ungasis
1981	Age Doesn't Matter	Enteng
1981	Palpak Connection	Jaworsky
1981	Mr. One-Two-Three Part 2	Toto
1981	Bilibid Gays	Vic
1981	D'Gradwets	Maverick
1981	Mag-toning Muna Tayo	Vic
1981	Iskul Bukol	Vic Ungasis
1981	Tartan	Tartan
1982	Si Ako at... Tres Muskiteros!	Poldong Muskitero
1982	Tatlo Silang Tatay Ko	Eastwood
1983	Buhay Misis	Ilyo
1984	Goodah	Renato
1984	Give Me Five!	Michael
1984	Naku Ha!	Toribio
1985	Ride on Baby	Paul
1985	Super Wan-tu-tri	Gaspar
1985	Doctor, Doctor, We Are Sick	Ricky
1985	I Have Three Hands	Jovito 'Bitoy' Agatep
1985	Mama Said Papa Said I Love You	Bogs
1985	Ma'am May We Go Out	Chipipoy "Chip" Soriano
1986	Working Boys	Bert
1986	Horsey-Horsey: Tigidig-Tigidig	Eddie
1986	Send in the Clowns	Ricky
1987	Forward March	Omeng
1987	The Best of Iskul Bukol: The Movie	Vic Ungasis
1987	Shoot That Ball	Manoy
1987	Ready!.. Aim!.. Fire!..	Sugar Ray
1988	Fly Me to the Moon	Galileo
1988	Wake Up Little Susie	Napoleon Timawa
1988	Good Morning, Titser	Pedro
1988	Smith & Wesson	Jessie Wesson
1989	Si Malakas at si Maganda	Oyo / Malakas
1989	Gawa Na ang Bala para sa Akin	Nanding
1990	My Funny Valentine	Florante
1990	Hotdog	Jose
1990	Twist: Ako si Ikaw, Ikaw si Ako	Bogart
1990	Ganda Babae, Ganda Lalake	Victor
1990	Crocodile Jones: The Son of Indiana Dundee	Crocodile Jones
1990	Kabayo Kids	Jockey Nanding
1990	I Have 3 Eggs	Sylvester
1990	Samson & Goliath	Samson
1990	Iputok Mo... Dadapa Ako! (Hard to Die)	Bruce Dilis
1991	Onyong Majikero	Onyong
1991	Rocky Plus V	Rocky
1991	Okay Ka, Fairy Ko!: The Movie	Enteng Kabisote
1992	Ano Ba Yan?	Victor
1992	Okay Ka, Fairy Ko!: Part 2	Enteng Kabisote
1992	Boy Anghel: Utak Pulburon	Boy Anghel
1992	Sam & Miguel (Your Basura, No Problema)	Sam
1992	Ang Tange Kong Pag-ibig	Restituto Roso
1993	Ano Ba 'Yan 2	Victor Dimasupil
1993	Ang Kuya Kong Siga	Johnny
1994	Hindi Pa Tapos ang Labada, Darling	Victor "Toryo" Dimasupil
1994	Tunay na Magkaibigan, Walang Iwanan... Peksman!	Estong
1994	Once Upon a Time in Manila	Jet
1995	Isang Kahig, Tatlong Tuka (Daddy ka na, Mommy ka pa!)	Victor
1996	Enteng and the Shaolin Kid	Enteng
1996	Lab en Kisses	Lab
1997	Biyudo si Daddy, Biyuda si Mommy	Victor "Labandero" Vasquez
1997	Enteng en Mokong: Kaming mga Mababaw ang Kaligayahan	Andrew
1998	D'Sisters: Nuns of the Above	Victor Dimasupil / Sister Victoria
1999	Basta't Ikaw... Nanginginig Pa	Enteng
2000	Bakit Ba Ganyan? (Ewan Ko Nga Ba, Darling)	Ricky Belo
2003	Lastikman	Larry / Lastikman
2003	Fantastic Man	Fredo / Fantastic Man
2004	Enteng Kabisote: OK Ka Fairy Ko... The Legend	Enteng Kabisote
2005	Perfect: Eat Bulaga Special	Himself
2005	Ispiritista: Itay, May Moomoo!	Victor
2005	The GMA All-Star Special	Himself
2005	Enteng Kabisote 2: Okay Ka Fairy Ko... The Legend Continues!	Enteng Kabisote
2006	Enteng Kabisote 3: Okay Ka, Fairy Ko: The Legend Goes On and On and On	Enteng Kabisote
2007	Enteng Kabisote 4: Okay Ka Fairy Ko...The Beginning of the Legend	Enteng Kabisote
2008	Dobol Trobol: Lets Get Redi 2 Rambol!	Arthur Calaycay
2008	Scaregivers	Specialist Doctor
2008	Iskul Bukol: 20 Years After	Vic Ungasis
2009	Love on Line (LOL)	Samson Alumpihit Jr.
2009	Ang Darling Kong Aswang	Victor Lagman
2010	Si Agimat at si Enteng Kabisote	Enteng Kabisote
2011	Pak! Pak! My Dr. Kwak!	Angelo Racela
2011	Enteng ng Ina Mo	Enteng Kabisote
2012	D' Kilabots Pogi Brothers Weh?!	Bossing Chairman
2012	Si Agimat, Si Enteng at Ako	Enteng Kabisote
2013	My Little Bossings	Torky Villanueva
2014	My Big Bossing's Adventures	Bossing / Vince / Torius
2015	My Bebe Love: #KiligPaMore	Vito Carillo
2016	Enteng Kabisote 10 and the Abangers	Enteng Kabisote
2017	Meant to Beh	Ronaldo Balatbat
2018	Jack Em Popoy: The Puliscredibles	Perfecto "Popoy / Pops" Fernandez
2019	Mission Unstapabol: The Don Identity	Don Robert Fortun
2024	The Kingdom	Lakan Makisig Nandula
2026	The Greatest Showdown	Kingston

=== Television ===
Year	Title	Role
1975–1976	OK Lang!	Himself (host)
1975–1979	Discorama	Himself (host)
1976–1979	Student Canteen	Himself (host)
1978–1988	Iskul Bukol	Vic Ungasis
1979–1981	C.U.T.E. (Call Us Two for Entertainment)	Himself (host)
1979–present	Eat Bulaga!	Himself (host)
1982–1983	2+2	Himself (host)
1987–1997	Okay Ka, Fairy Ko!	Enteng Kabisote
1988	Coney Reyes on Camera	Himself (guest)
1989–1992	TVJ (TeleVision's Jesters)	Himself (host)
1992	TVJ on 5 (TeleVision's Jesters on 5)	Himself (host)
1992	Rock n' Roll 2000	Himself (host, performer)
1994–1997	Mixed nuts! (Numero Unong Terrific Show)	Himself (host)
1997	1 for 3	Himself (host)
2001	Korek na Korek Ka Dyan	Himself (host)
2001–2007	Daddy Di Do Du	Kul
2004	Eat Bulaga! Silver Special	Himself (host)
2005	A Telefantastic Christmas: The GMA All-Star Special	Himself (various roles)
2007–2009	Ful Haus	Ful
2009–2015	Who Wants to Be a Millionaire?	Himself (host)
2010–2011	My Darling Aswang	Victor
2010–2011	LOL: Laugh Or Lose	Himself (host)
2011	R U Kidding Me!	Himself (host)
2011–2012	The Jose and Wally Show Starring Vic Sotto	Himself (host)
2012–2013	The Million Peso Money Drop	Himself (host)
2013–2016	Vampire ang Daddy Ko	Victor Ventura
2014–2015	Lucky Me Nam Nam Dear Bossing	Himself (host)
2015	Eat Bulaga Lenten Special: Sukli ng Pagmamahal	Greg
2015	Sabado Badoo	Cameo
2016	Eat Bulaga Lenten Special: Panata	Moises
2016–2017	Hay Bahay!	Vio
2017	Eat Bulaga Lenten Special: Kaibigan	Vito
2017–2018	Bossing & Ai	Himself (host)
2018	Eat Bulaga Lenten Special: Taray ni Tatay	Mario delos Santos
2018–2023	Daddy's Gurl	Barak Otogan
2019	Eat Bulaga Lenten Special: Ikigai: Buhay ng Buhay Ko	Tonio
2022–present	Love, Bosleng and Tali	Himself
2023–2024	Open 24/7	Elvis Zacharus "Boss Ez" Fontanilla
2023–2024	E.A.T.	Himself (host)

== Awards and nominations ==
Year	Award	Category	Result
—	Guillermo Mendoza's Entertainment Awards	Five-time Box-Office King	Won
1986–1990, 1992, 1996, 2001, 2003, and 2004	PMPC Star Awards for Television	Best Actor in a Comedy Series	Won; Okay Ka Fairy Ko; Daddy Di Do Du (GMA)
1989–1990, 1992, 1995, 1997–1998, 2000, 2003, and 2008	PMPC Star Awards for Television	Best Male Variety Show Host	Won; Eat Bulaga! (GMA)
2006–2007, and 2009	Enpress	Best Male Variety Host	Won; Eat Bulaga! (GMA)
2007	Guillermo Mendoza's Entertainment Awards	Comedy Box Office King	Won
2008	GMMSF Box-Office Entertainment Awards	All Time Box-Office King; Special Award	Won
2009	GMMSF Box-Office Entertainment Awards	Comedy Box Office King	Won (with Dolphy for Dobol Trobol)
2009	35th Metro Manila Film Festival	Best Festival Actor for Ang Darling Kong Aswang	Nominated
2010	GMMSF Box-Office Entertainment Awards	Comedy Box Office King	Won
2010	GME	Comedy Box Office King	Won
2010	Eastwood City Walk Of Fame	Celebrity Inductee	Won
2010–2011	PMPC Star Awards for Television	Best Game Show Host	Won; Who Wants To Be A Millionaire? (TV5)
2011–2012	NSSUU	Best Variety Game Show Host	Won; Eat Bulaga! (GMA)
2011	GMMSF Box-Office Entertainment Awards	Box-Office Kings (with Bong Revilla)	Won; Si Agimat at si Enteng Kabisote
2011	37th Metro Manila Film Festival	Best Festival Actor for Enteng Ng Ina Mo	Nominated
2012	GMMSF Box-Office Entertainment Awards	Box-Office Tandem (with Ai Ai delas Alas)	Won; Enteng Ng Ina Mo
2013	Reader's Digest	Most Trusted TV Host for Entertainment and Variety	Won; Eat Bulaga! (GMA)
2013	Yahoo! Philippines OMG! Awards	Favorite Male TV Host of the Year	Won; Eat Bulaga! (GMA)
2013	39th Metro Manila Film Festival	Best Festival Actor for My Little Bossings	Nominated
2014	GMMSF Box-Office Entertainment Awards	Phenomenal Stars (with Vice Ganda)	Won; My Little Bossings
2016	6th EdukCircle Awards	Most Influential Film Actor of the Year for My Bebe Love: #KiligPaMore	Won

== See also ==
- Pepsi Paloma
- Spoliarium (Eraserheads song)
- The Rapists of Pepsi Paloma (film)
