= Sunshine Records (Philippines) =

Philippine record label

- Parent company: Vicor Music Corporation
- Founded: Early 1970s 2024 (second incarnation)
- Founder: Orly Ilacad
- Distributor: Vicor Music Corporation (Viva Records Corporation)
- Genre: Various
- Country of origin: Philippines
- Location: Pasig

Sunshine Records is a Filipino record label owned by Viva Records Corporation. It was established in the early 1970s by Orly Ilacad, the co-founder of Vicor Music.

Some of the songs that became hits under the label were "Ang Nobya Kong Sexy" by the Apo Hiking Society, "Ang Boyfriend Kong Baduy" by Cinderella in 1976, "Dukha" performed by Judas in 1978, "Pakita Mo" by Archie D. in 1990, and "Kaba" by Tenten Muñoz in 1991.

The label became dormant by 1994 and its artists were moved to its parent Vicor. It was later revived as a sub-label of Viva Records in 2023, with the Eat Bulaga! Singing Queens as their first contract artist.

== Notable artists ==
- Bluejeans
- Cinderella
- Sharon Cuneta
- Helen Gamboa
- The Hi-Jacks
- Tillie Moreno
- Max Surban
- Martin Nievera
- Rico J. Puno
- Randy Santiago
- Side A
- VST & Company
- Basil Valdez
- Gary Valenciano
- Regine Velasquez
- Yoyoy Villame
- April Boys
- John Melo
- Renz Verano
- Donna Cruz
- Ima Castro
- Lloyd Umali
- Rockstar 2
- Singing Queens
