= JC Jacinto =

Filipino visual artist (born 1985)

JC Cortez Jacinto
- Born: John Carlo Jacinto; February 15, 1985 (age 41); Pasig, Philippines
- Education: University of the Philippines

JC Jacinto is a Filipino visual artist. His works have been featured in various galleries all over Manila, Philippines. While still studying at University of the Philippines, he has been qualified as a finalist in the Maningning Art Competition 2006, 39th and 40th Shell National Student’s Competition 2006 and 2007, and the PLDT Visual Art National Competition 2007.

== Biography ==
John Carlo Jacinto was born on February 15, 1985 in Pasig, Philippines. He graduated with a Bachelor of Fine Arts degree, major in Painting from University of the Philippines Diliman, Quezon City. He is currently residing in Cainta, Rizal.

Since 2005, John Carlo Jacinto has participated in over 30 exhibitions.

== Exhibits ==
=== 2006 ===
- Liongoren Gallery

=== 2007 ===
- The National Museum
- Prose Gallery
- Diliman Fine Arts Corridor

=== 2008 ===
- Open at Tam-awan Village, Baguio (2008-2011)

=== 2010 ===
- Pulld' String2 Stop at Galerie Anna, SM Megamall
- UP Diliman Film Center

=== 2011 ===
- In Corpo Delicto at Altro Mondo
- The Private Party at Kaida Contemporary Gallery, Quezon City

=== 2012 ===
- The Department of Foreign Affairs

=== 2013 ===
- Dissecting Air at West Gallery
- Strip Search at Art Galileia
- Versus at Art Galilea
- TENDER HOLLOW SURFACE at Galerie Anna, SM Megamall (2013-2014)

== Achievements ==
=== 2006 ===
- Finalist – 39th Shell National Student’s Competition
- Finalist – Maningning Art Competition

=== 2007 ===
- Finalist – 40th Shell National Student’s Competition
- Finalist – PLDT Visual Art Competition
