= Bahay na Tisa =

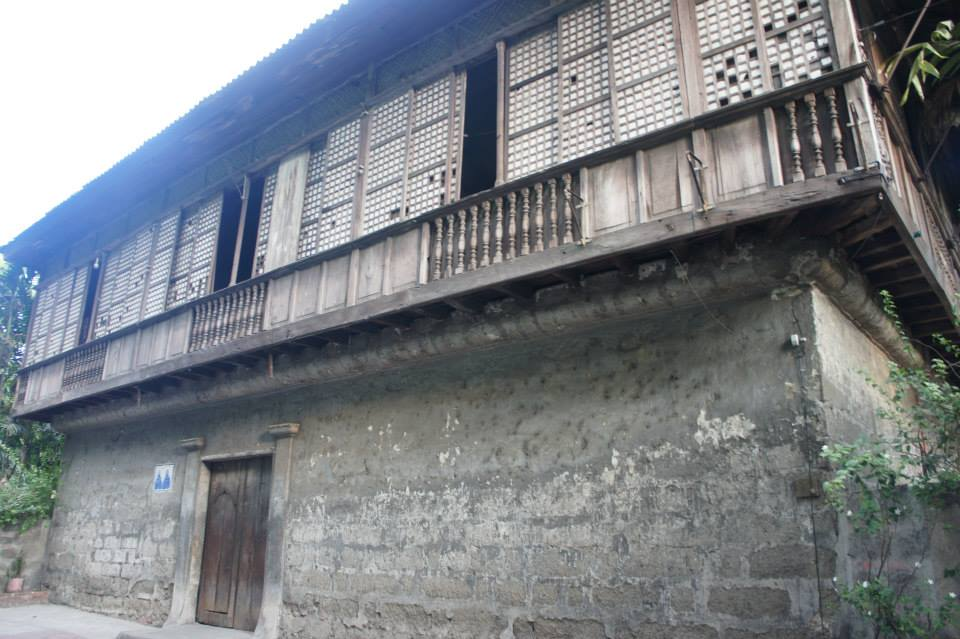
- Interactive map of the Bahay na Tisa area
- Alternative names: Freedom House

General information
- Architectural style: Bahay na bato
- Location: P. Gomez Street, Pasig, Metro Manila, Philippines
- Coordinates: 14°33′38.394″N 121°4′27.289″E
- Completed: 1846
- Owner: Tech family

The Bahay na Tisa (lit. 'House of clay tiles') is a historic house in Pasig, Metro Manila, Philippines. It is the oldest extant building in the city.

== Background ==
The Bahay na Tisa was built in 1846 by Don Cecilio Tech y Cabrera. It is among the buildings which survived World War II.

During the Martial law era under President Ferdinand Marcos, it became known as the Freedom House and was used a meeting place for both anti and pro-Marcos groups.

At one point, the house also was used as the headquarters of Barangay San Jose. For Roman Catholics, the house hosts the Santo Niño de Pasion.

The Pasig city government under then-Mayor Robert Eusebio signed an ordinance for the expropriation of the building, which would seize the ownership of the building from the Tech family. The Tech family claimed that they were not consulted with the move while the Pasig government alleged they were unresponsive to attempts to reach out to them.

In 2020, the house would be declared as an Important Cultural Property (ICP) superseding the ordinance and gave the Tech family assistance from the national government to conserve and protect the site. The Tech family still owns the house as of 2020.

== Heritage recognition ==
The National Museum of the Philippines has recognized structure as an Important Cultural Property on February 19, 2020. The Pasig city government has also conferred the Dangal ng Lahi recognition to the house for its cultural contribution to the city in 2009.
