= Pasig City Hall =

Government building in Pasig, Philippines

- Aerial view of the complex, July 2026

General information
- Location: Caruncho Avenue
- Year built: 2025–2026
- Groundbreaking: October 15, 2025
- Topped-out: June 15, 2026
- Owner: Pasig City Government

Design and construction
- Architecture firm: Royal Pineda + Architecture Design
- Other designers: Royal Pineda (design consultant)

The Pasig City Hall is a government building which serves as the seat of the city government of Pasig in Metro Manila, Philippines. The intended permanent site is in barangay San Nicolas while the local government temporarily holds office in a building in Bridgetowne since 2024.

== History ==
=== Original city hall ===
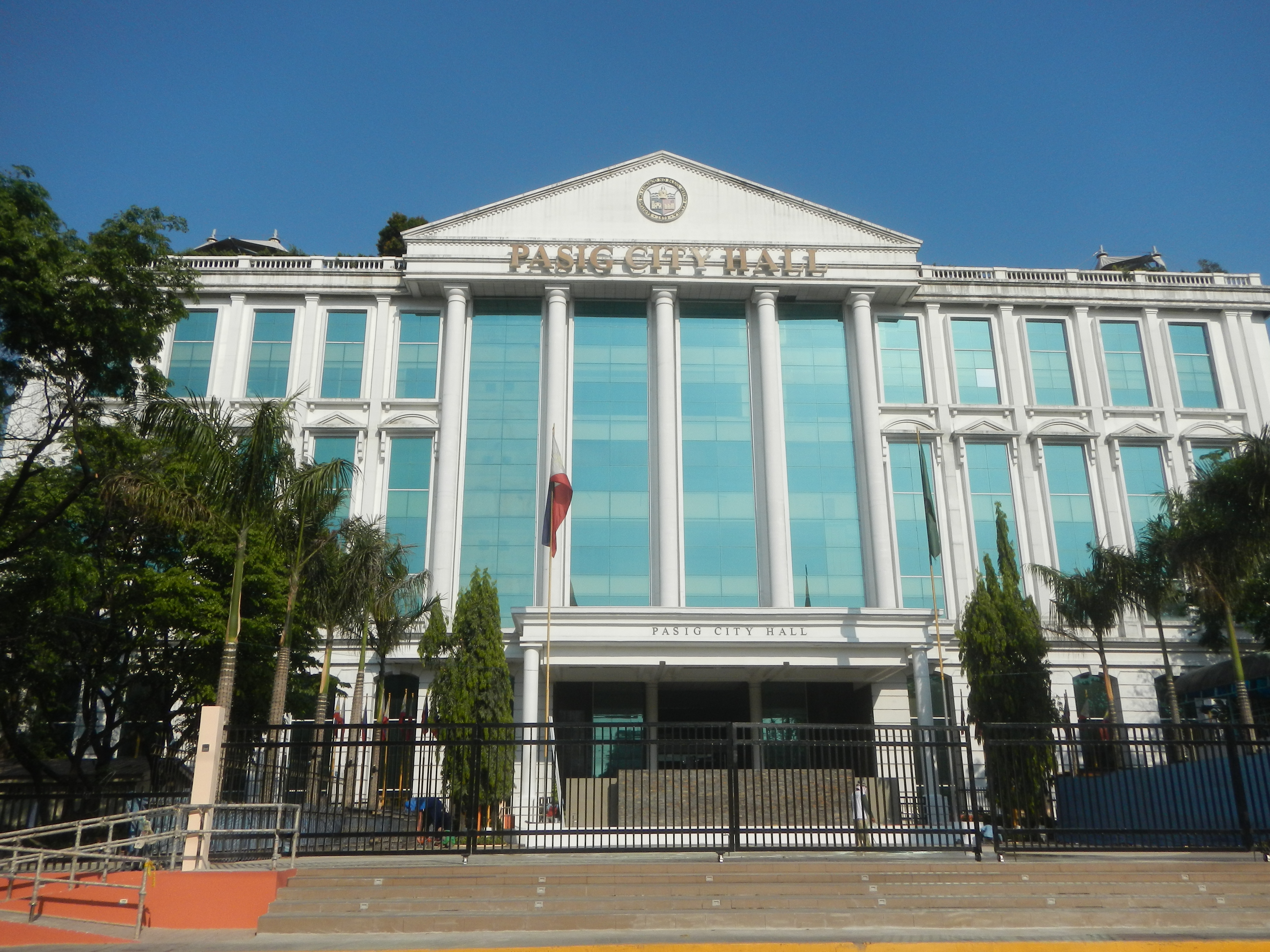
Old Pasig City Hall

The old Pasig City Hall had stood up in its site as early as the 1960s as the municipal hall of the then municipality of Pasig. It was just a four-storey structure. It was later expanded at least three times becoming an eight-storey structure.

=== Current structure ===
Temporary Pasig City Hall in Bridgetowne.

Mayor Vico Sotto unveiled a plan to develop a new city hall complex for Pasig in July 2023, as part of the 450th anniversary of the city. He cites structural issues of the old city hall as justification for the project.

A temporary city hall was built in Bridgetowne which was leased to the city government. By July 2024, the transfer of equipment to the temporary structure has already begun. On September 16, 2024, operations of some offices has already began. The old city hall was closed in February 2025.

The groundbreaking for the new city hall began on October 15, 2025. The topping off ceremony of the building was held on June 15, 2026.

== Architecture and design ==
The new Pasig City Hall was designed by architecture firm Royal Pineda + Architecture Design with architect Royal Pineda himself serving as a design consultant. The project was a cooperation between the Pasig city government and the Pasig City Hall Construction Consortium (PCHCC) which consists of the companies Santa Clara International Corporation, Bandar Hebat Builders, and PhilJaya Property Management Corporation.
