= Roderick Macutay =

Filipino mural artist and contemporary painter

- Born: Roderick "Derrick" Colminas Macutay; September 12, 1971 (age 54); Pasig, Philippines
- Education: UST Bachelor of Fine Arts major in Painting
- Known for: Painting
- Awards: 100 Years Of Filipino Migration To Hawaii

Roderick "Derrick" Colminas Macutay (born September 12, 1971 in Pasig) is a Filipino mural artist and contemporary painter, known for his distinctive subject of surreal portraits of humans, robots, cyborgs and android like creatures and his signature color of monochrome blue usually with a vibrant accent color. His works range from mural paintings to oil paintings and illustrations.

Roderick graduated in 1992 from University of Santo Tomas, after studying fine art painting for four years. Additionally, he trained with Angono Masters.

Macutay was mentored by Salvador Juban, a protege and assistant of the late Carlos “Botong” Francisco, a National Artist and a titan in modern Philippine art.

== Published Artworks ==
- The First Contact (2021), National Historical Commission of the Philippines.
- Strangers (2021), National Historical Commission of the Philippines.
- Ties that come a long way (2016), Wellington Museum - Commissioned by the Philippine Embassy in Wellington New Zealand.

== Contributions to Philippine Historical and Cultural Heritage ==
- In 2021, three historical markers unveiled in Guiuan, Eastern Samar, Philippines, in commemoration of the Quincentennial of the First Circumnavigation of the World were based on the sketches of muralist Derrick Macutay and executed in dust marble relief by sculptors Jonas Roces and Francis Apiles.
- In 2016, Macutay handled the digital graphic art of the book - Historical Atlas of the Republic (of the Philippines), published by The Presidential Communications Development and Strategic Planning Office. The book showed the development of the Philippine geopolitical landscape, the colonization of the Philippines by different foreign powers, and the expansion of Philippine national sovereignty.
- In 2014, he created a commemorative coin design and a stamp design for the 70th anniversary of the Leyte Gulf Landing in the Philippines.
- In 2013, the Philippine Postal Corp. pitched in to honor the 150th birth anniversary of Andres Bonifacio, a Philippine national hero, by issuing stamps featuring the Father of the Philippine Revolution designed by Roderick Macutay among three other artists.
- In 2012, the Museo Diocesano de Pasig showcased the history of Pasig as intertwined with that of the church, from prehistoric times to the present. This was portrayed by artist Derrick Macutay in a 60 ft x 5 ft mural in acrylic exhibited at the museum hallway.

== List of exhibitions ==
SOLO EXHIBITION

Year	Exhibit Information
2008	"TECHKNOW" First One Man Solo Exhibition The Big & Small Art Co. 4th level SM Megamall

GROUP EXHIBITIONS

Year	Exhibition Information
2011	"Diversities" Artist space Ayala Museum, Makati City "Sa Ngalan" Sigwada Gallery Anniversary show 1921 Oroquietta St. Sta. Cruz, Manila Korea-Phils Joint Art Exhibit Shangrila Plaza Edsa Mall "Dreams & Memoirs" group exhibit Trade X Cocktail Bar Makati City "NAUNCE" group exhibit 12th Flr GT Towers Makati Makati City "A Day in a Life" Group Exhibit 2nd floor Atrium Podium Ortigas, Pasig "diverCITY" Group Exhibition Pasig City Museum Pasig "THE BOY RIZAL" Centennial Hall, Manila Hotel Manila City 63rd Anniversary Art Association of the Philippines Kanlungan ng Sining, Luneta Park Manila City FORMED and FORMS I and II (an Art Manifesto) Edilberto Dagot Hall, Philippine Normal University Taft Avenue, Manila and PWU Manila
2010	2011 "DEKLARASYON" Kalye Art Gallery Estrada St, Singalong Manila 1st Philippine Air Force/ A.A.P. Art Competition Awards Night Villamor Airbase Aerospace Museum Art for Water fund raising Exhibit Lancaster Hotel, Shaw Boulevard Mandaluyong Korean Art Festival GyeongSan, South Korea "PLAYGROUND OF THE GODS" 3 man group exhibit Featuring the works of Odette Cagandahan, Derrick Macutay & Noel Solis Artis Corpus and with Sining Kamalig Gateway Cubao, Quezon City “Romance within” FA:RM group exhibit Sining sa Silong Art Gallery FDRC Bldg. Bo. Ugong, Pasig “KAPITAL” a tribute to Labor Art exhibit Jose Vargas Museum U.P. Diliman, Quezon City ManilArt Fair 2010 SMX Mall of Asia, Pasay “AMANG BAYAN” SM City Sta. Mesa, Manila/ Quantum Bar and Café Makati City “UNCOMMON GROUNDS: Maquina Erotiqua” Artist Space, Ayala Museum Makati City “DOPPELGANGERS, The Unnamed and a Diamond Hidden in the Mouth of a Corpse” Finale Art File, Upstairs Gallery Warehouse 17, La Fuerza Compound (Gate 1), 2241 Pasong Tamo, Makati City
2009	“ALAY KAY MARIA” Araw ng Pasig Exhibition Pasig City Museum Pasig “EASTERN EXPOSURE” Neo-Angono Artist Collective Group Exhibition Pinto Art Gallery and Silangan Studio Gallery, Antipolo “RED PAINTINGS” The Big and Small Art Co. SM Cubao Stage 103, Lower Ground Floor Times Square Wellness II “ROSA NEGRA” Artis Corpus Gallery Haig St. Mandaluyong “ART FOR YOUTH’S SAKE” Southwing Lobby House of Representative Batasan, Quezon City “MUSCOVADO” a six-man exhibit Gallery Anna, SM Megamall Mandaluyong “ISKWALADO” group exhibit Gallery Anna, SM Megamall Mandaluyong “HeART for a cause” Consipary Bar, Quezon City SINUGDANAN Art Summit Exhibit Absinthe Bar, Greenbelt 3 Makati City “13:52 Dos“and “Himatmat” GSIS Museum Roxas Blvd, Manila & SM Art Center Cebu City Korea Art Festival Seoul, South Korea Tagpuan II Pagyabong ng Sining sa Pasig A Pasig Artists Exhibit Pasig City Museum “GLASS UTOPIA” Verdana Art Gallery 39 Castrillo St. Corinthian Gardens, Quezon City “All about coffee” The Block. SM Northpoint, Quezon City “ALTER EGO” Tala Gallery Sct. De Guia cor Tomas Morato Kamuning, Quezon City UNANG HAYAG SINING Emerging Artist 2009 Galerie Anna 7th Flr Ramon Magsaysay Center Roxas Blvd, Manila CIIT Group Art Exhibit CIIT Campus Tomas Morato, Quezon City
2008	4th Backdoor Music and Arts Festival SM Megatrade hall SM Megamall AAP Exhibit U.S.T. Beato Angelico Gallery Espana, Manila Philip Morris Awards Night and Exhibition National Museum Manila GSIS/ A.A.P. Art Exhibition GSIS Museum Macapagal Boulevard, Manila “SSENSES”: Group Art Exhibition Habi Gallery Unit C-235 Serendra, Fort Bonifacio Global City, Taguig, Metro Manila “Panata, Penitensiya Pininta-alay kay Kristo” Art Exhibit Kanlungan ng Sining Rizal Park Metro Manila Drawing Society Painting Exhibit The Big & Small Art Co., SM Megamall, Mandaluyong
2007	2007 Philip Morris Art Awards Regional Winners Exhibition National Museum Manila “KEBAITAN” expressing the beauty of art thru birth SM Subic Clark, Pampanga 3rd GSIS Art Exhibition GSIS Museum Macapagal Boulevard Manila 50th Golden Anniversary Pasig Art Club Pasig City Museum Pasig
2006	MA.D.E. Metrobank Art Contest Le Pavilion Metropolitan Park, Roxas Boulevard 100 Years of Filipino Migration to Hawaii Mural Awarding & Exhibition SM Mall of Asia The 2nd Philippine Drawing Society Inc.Exhibit The Big & Small Art Co., SM Megamall, Mandaluyong “deNuded” Pasig Art Club Group Exhibit Pasig City Museum
2005	“Side by Side” Pasig Art Club Group Exhibit Pasig City Museum “Free Spirit” Group Art Exhibit Pasig City Museum
2004	“Sining Kalikasan” Kalipunan ng Sining at Kultura ng Pasig Group Exhibit Pasig City Museum 2nd anniversary exhibit Pasig Art Club Group Exhibit Pasig City Museum
2003	“Art Peace” Pasig Art Club Group Exhibit Pasig City Museum
2002	“Hardin” Kalipunan ng Sining at Kultura ng Pasig Group Exhibit Pasig City Museum “Senakulo” Pasig City Museum “Antipolo Noon, Antipolo Ngayon” Villa Cristina Resort Antipolo City
2001	“Tagpuan” Pasig Artists Exhibit Pasig City Museum “Wangis” Kalipunan ng Sining at Kultura ng Pasig Group Exhibit Pasig City Museum “Batang Pinoy” Marikina Heritage House Marikina
1999	Picache Ancestral Homes Heroe’s Drive, Quezon City
1992-1997	A.A.P. Annual art Exhibit Shangrila Plaza/GSIS Bldg Bldg.
1998	Philippine Centennial Painting Competition and Exhibit AFP Museum Camp Gen. Emilio Aguinaldo, Quezon City
1995	Alumni Art Exhibit University of Santo Tomas España, Manila
1993	Alumni Art Exhibit University of Santo Tomas España, Manila
1992	“Sariling Kulay” Philamlife Bldg. U.N. Avenue, Ermita, Manila “Sining at Kulay” Pasig Library and Museum 24th Shell National Students Art Competition and Exhibit Park Square, Makati City
1990	23rd Shell National Students Art Competition and Exhibit Park Square, Makati City
1998-1992	CAFA Day and University Week Annual Art Exhibit University of Santo Tomas España, Manila

== Awards and honors ==
Year	Award
2016	Winner, Metro Manila Region, Philippine Art Awards (PAA) 2015-2016
2010	Juror’s Choice 1st Philippine Air Force/ A.A.P. Art Competition Awards Night Villamor Airbase Aerospace Museum
2009	2nd Place On-the-spot competition sponsored by the Rotary Club of Makati Pasong Tamo Eastwood City Libis, Quezon City
2008	Finalist Drawing Society Painting Contest The Big and Small Gallery SM Megamall, Mandaluyong
2007	Finalist Metro Manila Art Awards Philip Morris Art Awards 2007 Finalist 2nd Drawing Society Drawing Contest The Big and Small Gallery SM Megamall, Mandaluyong Semi-Finalist A.A.P. Semi annual art contest ECCA Chateau Verde Vale Verde 1, Pasig Plaque of Recognition From the Sangguniang Bayan ng Pasig and office of the Mayor, Enteng Eusebio, for winning the Grand Prize Mural Competition for the 100th Anniversary of the Filipino Migration to Hawaii.
2006	Semi-Finalist M.A.D.E. Metrobank Art Competition Le Pavilion Metropolitan Park, Roxas Boulevard Grand Prize Winner 100 Years of Filipino Migration to Hawaii Mural Competition SM Mall of Asia Finalist The 2nd Philippine Drawing Society Inc.Exhibit The Big & Small Art Co., SM Megamall, Mandaluyong
2005	Finalist 2nd Intramuros on the Spot Painting Contest Instituto Cervantes
1999	Finalist Picache Ancestral House Painting Competition Heroe’s Drive, Quezon City
1998	Finalist Philippine Centennial Painting Competition and Exhibit AFP Museum Camp Gen. Emilio Aguinaldo, Quezon City
1995	First Prize Mural Making Contest Araw ng Pasig 2nd Prize On the Spot Drawing Contest Pastoral Youth Council Kalawaan, Pasig
1991	Semi-Finalist Metrobank Art Competition Finalist 24th Shell National Students Art Competition and Exhibit Park Square, Makati City
1990	Finalist 23rd Shell National Students Art Competition and Exhibit Park Square, Makati City
1989	First Prize Marian Year Drawing Competition District of San Roque, Makati
1988	First Prize Children’s Medical Center On the Spot Art Competition

== Organizations and clubs ==
- A.A.P. Art Association of the Philippines
- Pinsel Pasig Artist Group
- Gintong Sining UST
- Kalipunan ng Sining at Kultura ng Pasig
- Pasig Art Club
- NeoAngono Artist Collective
- Knights of Rizal JUAN LUNA CHAPTER Pasig
