= Pasig =

Highly urbanized city located in Metro Manila, Philippines

- Highly urbanized city
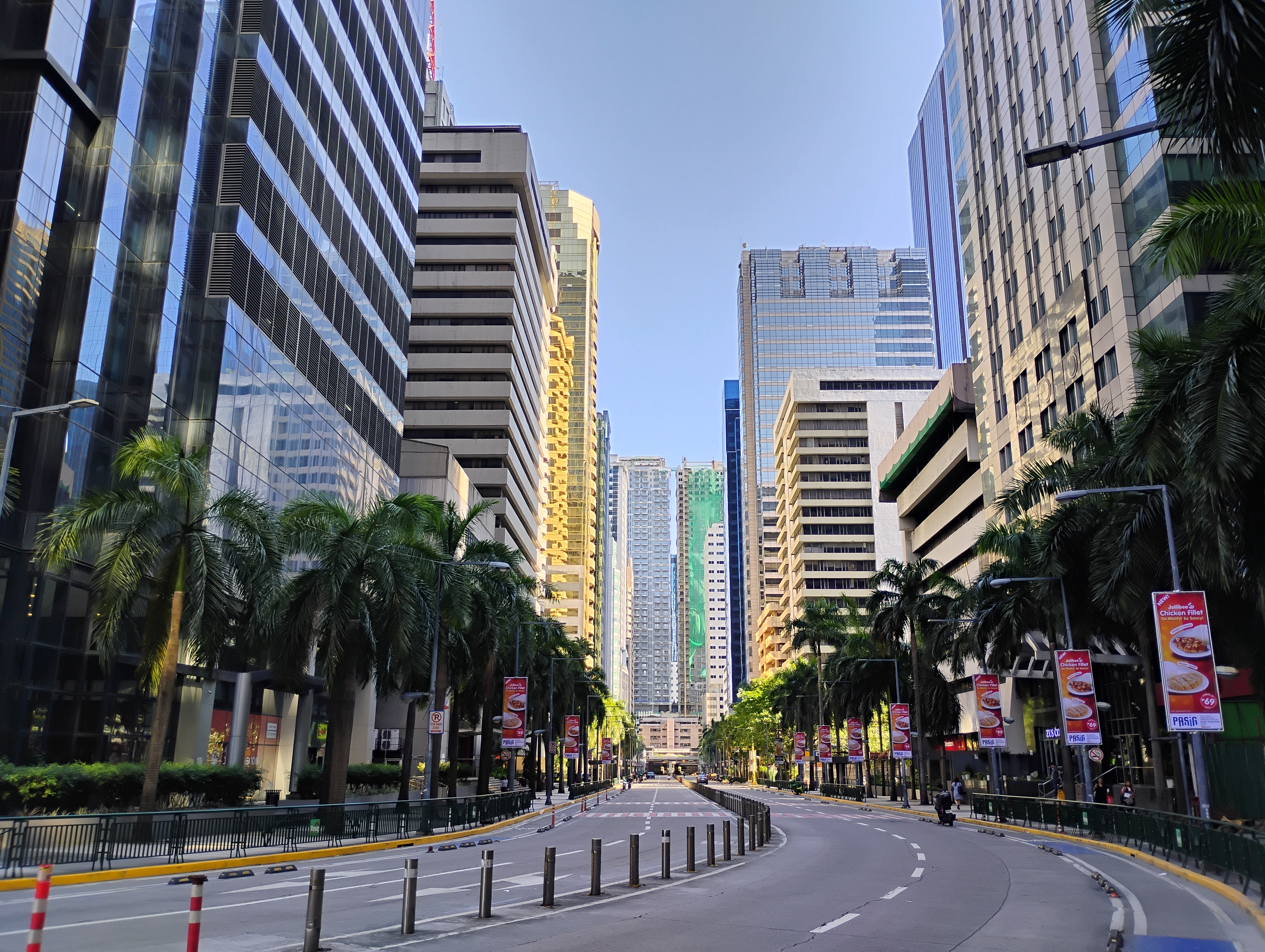
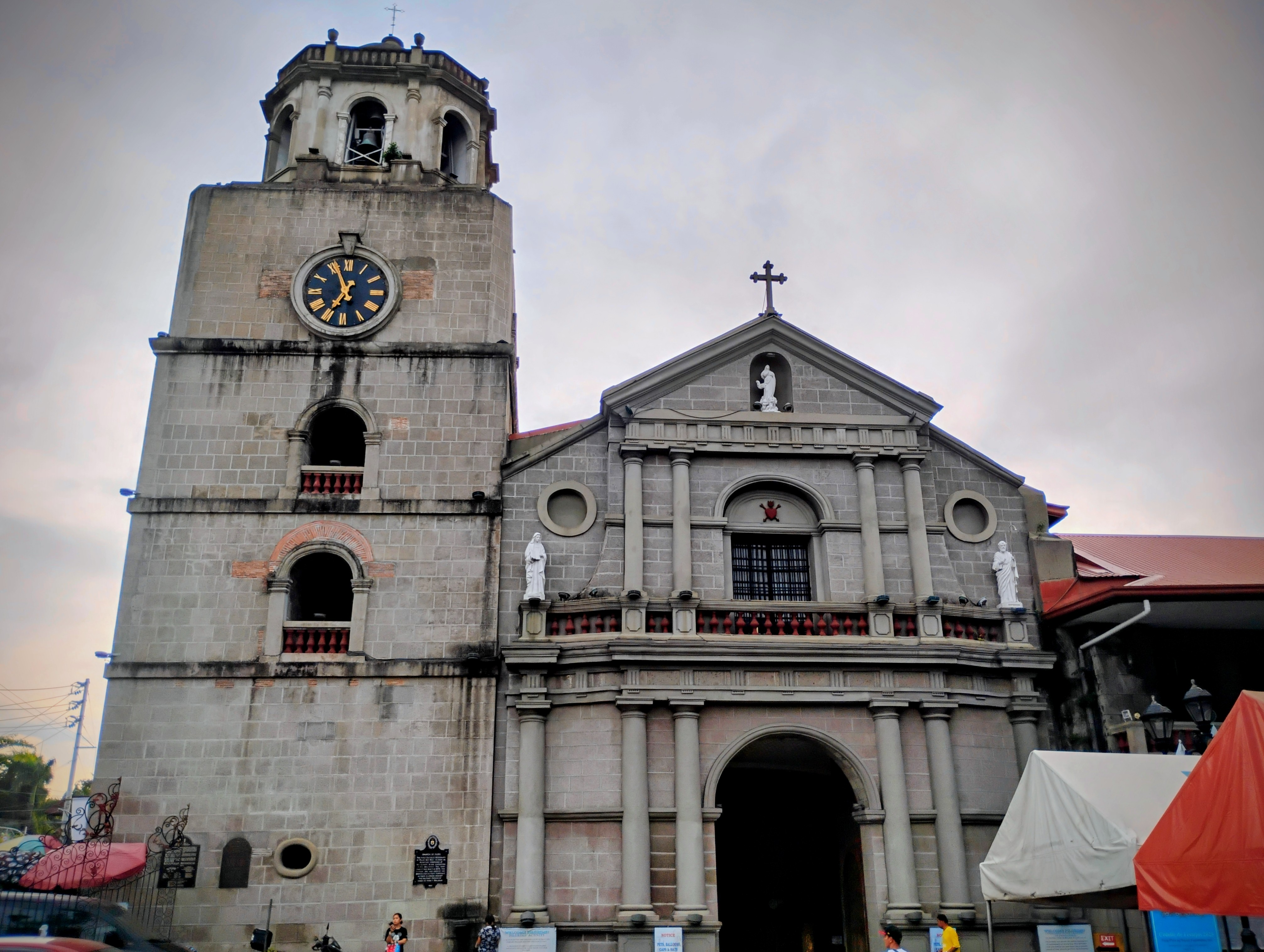
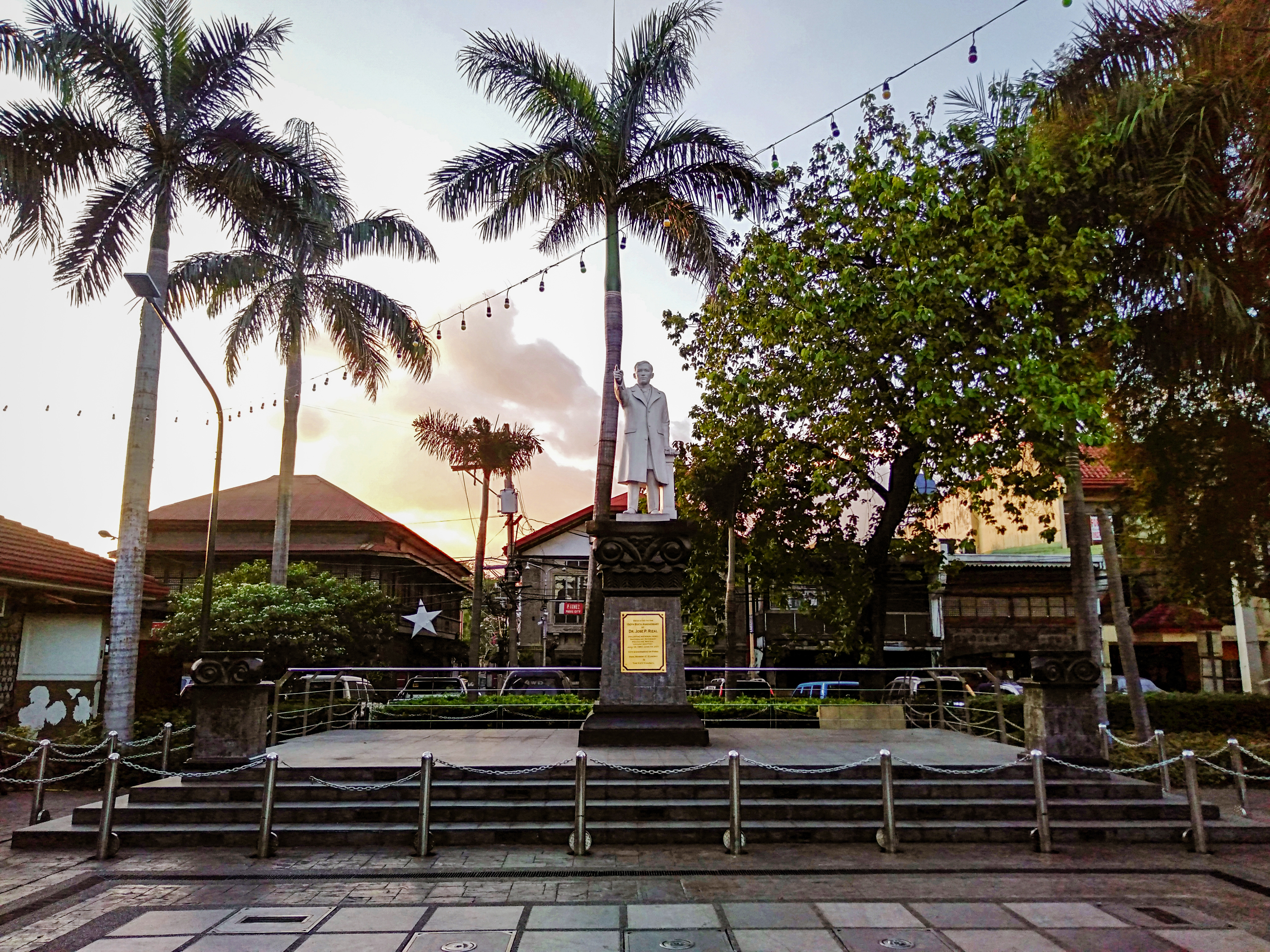
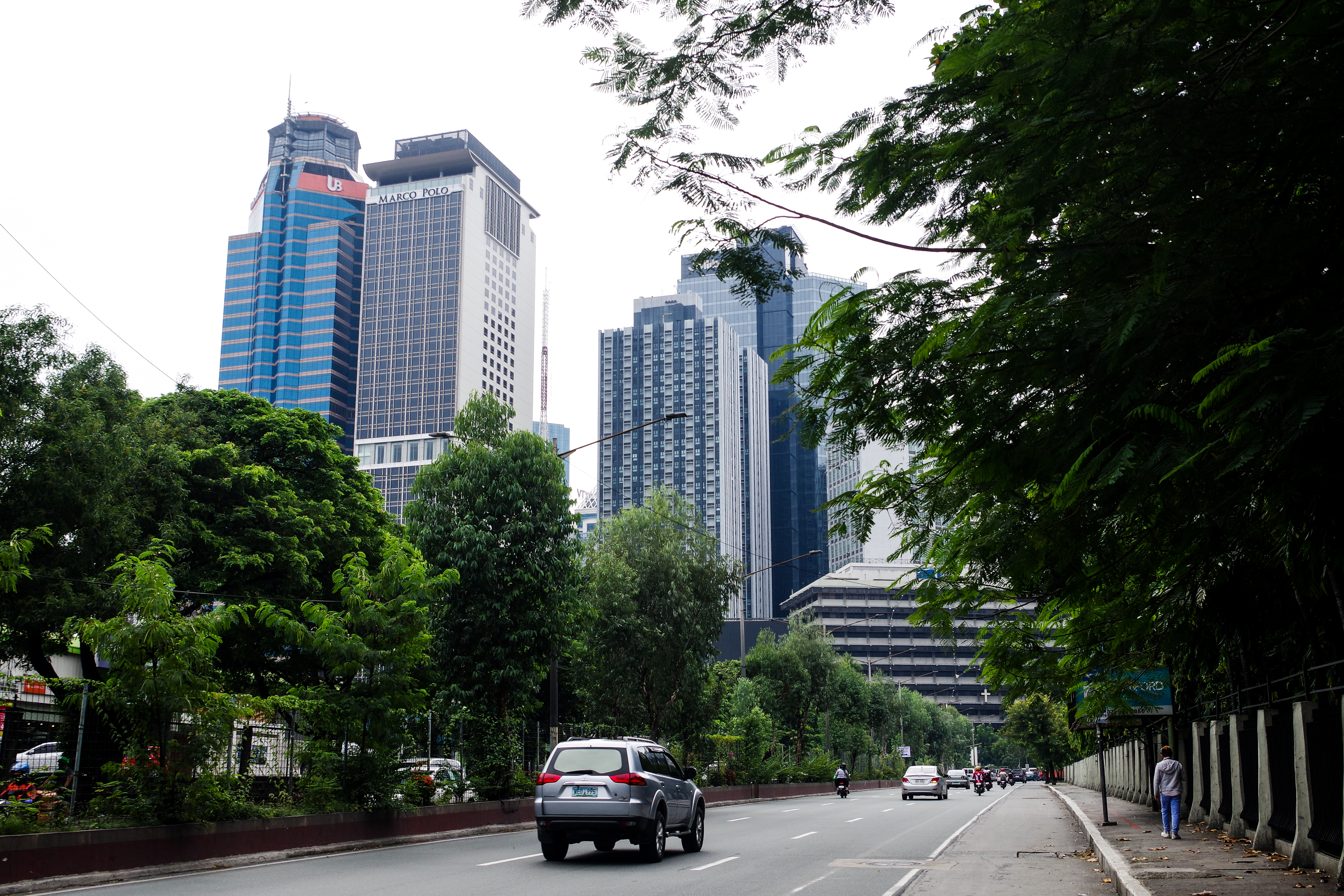
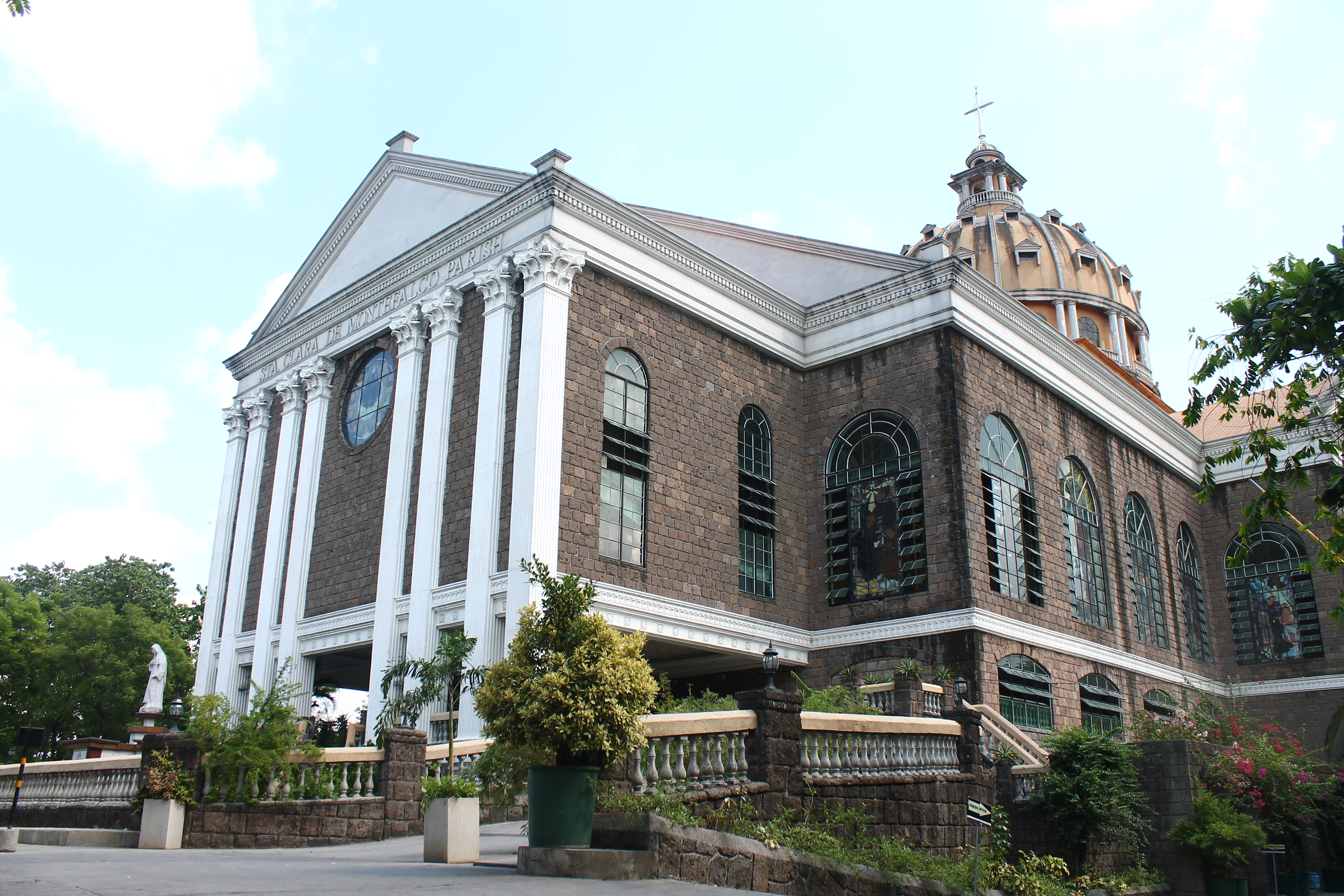
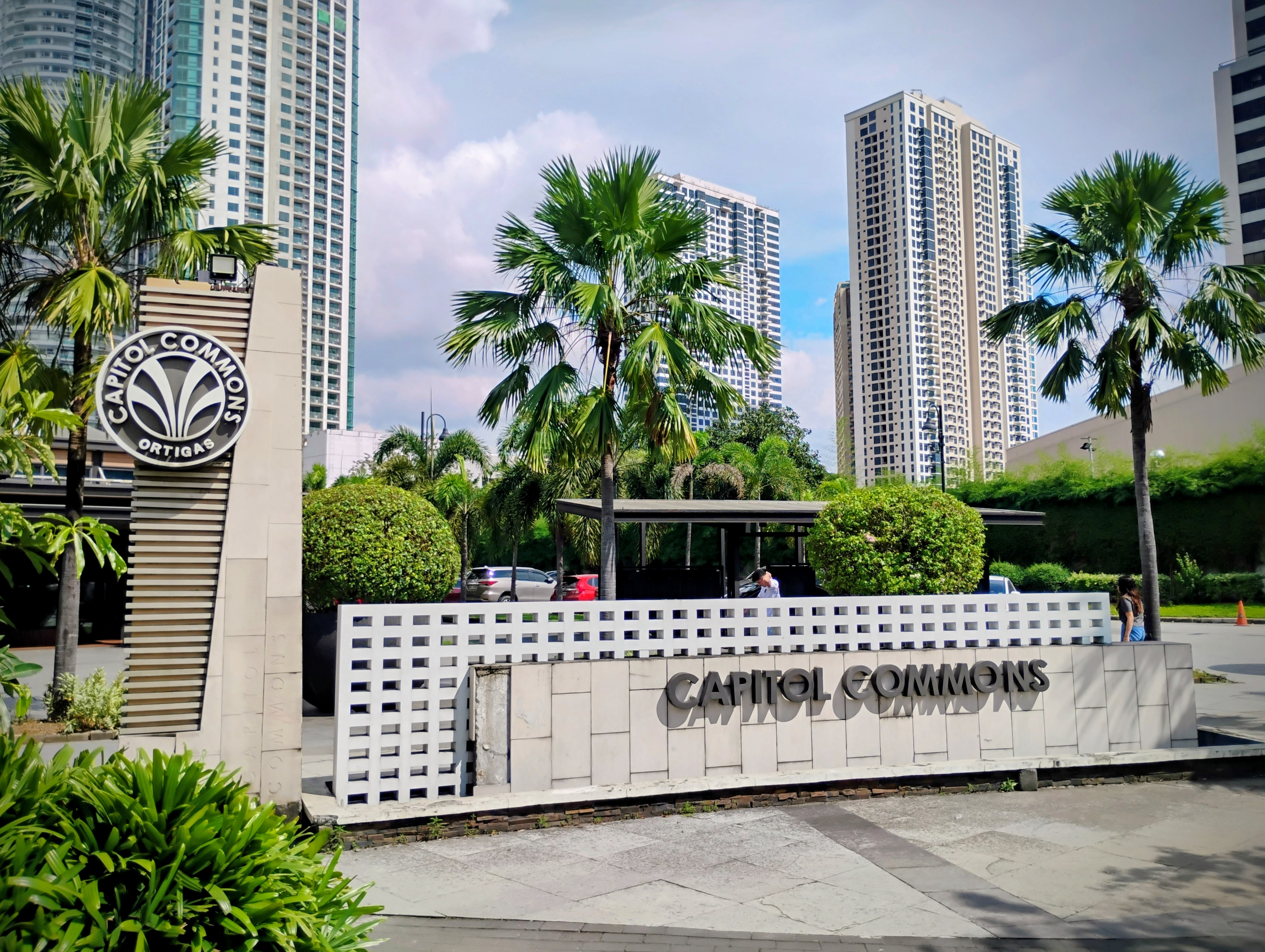
- F. Ortigas Jr. Road Pasig Cathedral Plaza Rizal Ortigas Avenue Montefalco Church New City Hall complex with the Pasig Revolving Tower Capitol Commons

- Flag Seal Wordmark
- Motto: Pasig: Umaagos ang Pag-asa; English: "Pasig: Hope Flows!"
- Map of Metro Manila with Pasig highlighted
- Interactive map of Pasig
- Location within the Philippines
- Coordinates: 14°33′38″N 121°04′35″E
- Country: Philippines
- Region: Metro Manila
- Province: None
- District: Lone district
- Established: July 2, 1573
- Cityhood and HUC: January 21, 1995
- Barangays: 30 (see Barangays)

Government
  - Type: Sangguniang Panlungsod
  - Mayor: Victor Ma. Regis N. Sotto (Giting ng Pasig)
  - Vice Mayor: Robert Vincent Jude B. Jaworski Jr. (Giting ng Pasig)
  - Representative: Roman T. Romulo (NPC/Giting ng Pasig)
  - Councilors: List: 1st District; Simon Gerard R. Tantoco; Raymund Francis S. Rustia; Paul Roman C. Santiago; Mark Gil M. Delos Santos; Roderick Mario U. Gonzales; Paul Angelo A. Senogat; 2nd District; Maria Luisa M. De Leon; Marion Rosalio M. Martires; Noel L. Agustin; Warren B. Inocencio; Ronald Alan M. Raymundo; Ryan R. Enriquez
  - Electorate: 463,885 voters (2025)

Area
  - Total: 48.46 km^{2} (18.71 sq mi)
- Elevation: 9.0 m (29.5 ft)
- Highest elevation: 136 m (446 ft)
- Lowest elevation: −1 m (−3.3 ft)

Population (2024 census)
  - Total: 853,050
  - Rank: 9th
  - Density: 17,600/km^{2} (45,590/sq mi)
  - Households: 212,895
- Demonym(s): Pasigueño (Male); Pasigueña (Female)

Economy
  - Income class: 1st city income class
  - Poverty incidence: 2.1% (2023)
  - Revenue: ₱ 18,643 million (2025)
  - Assets: ₱ 74,195 million (2025)
  - Expenditure: ₱ 15,452 million (2025)
  - Liabilities: ₱ 10,971 million (2025)

Service provider
  - Electricity: Manila Electric Company (Meralco)
  - Water: Manila Water
- Time zone: UTC+8 (PST)
- PSGC: 137403000
- IDD : area code: +63 (0)02
- Native languages: Filipino
- Major religions: Roman Catholic Church, Protestantism, Iglesia ni Cristo, Evangelicalism
- Feast date: December 8
- Catholic diocese: Roman Catholic Diocese of Pasig
- Patron saint: Immaculate Conception
- Website: pasigcity.gov.ph

Pasig March
This is the official march of Pasig, July 2, 1975
(Duration: 1 minute, 56 seconds)

Pasig, officially the City of Pasig (Filipino: Lungsod ng Pasig), is a highly urbanized city in the National Capital Region of the Philippines. According to the 2024 census, it has a population of 853,050 people.

Located along the eastern edge of Metro Manila, Pasig borders the province of Rizal and is traversed by the Pasig River, from which it takes its name. Formerly a predominantly rural settlement, the city has developed into a major residential, industrial, and commercial center, particularly following the development of Ortigas Center, which it shares with Mandaluyong and Quezon City. Pasig is also the seat of the Diocese of Pasig, based at Pasig Cathedral, which was established around the time of the town's founding in 1573.

Pasig was formerly part of Rizal province, being transferred to NCR's jurisdiction upon the latter's creation in 1975. Despite this, Pasig continued to serve as Rizal's official capital, and became a city in 1995; Rizal's provincial government later transferred its seat to Antipolo in 2009. Although the capitol had relocated, Pasig remained the de jure provincial capital until 2020, when Republic Act No. 11475 formally designated Antipolo as the capital of Rizal.

== Etymology ==
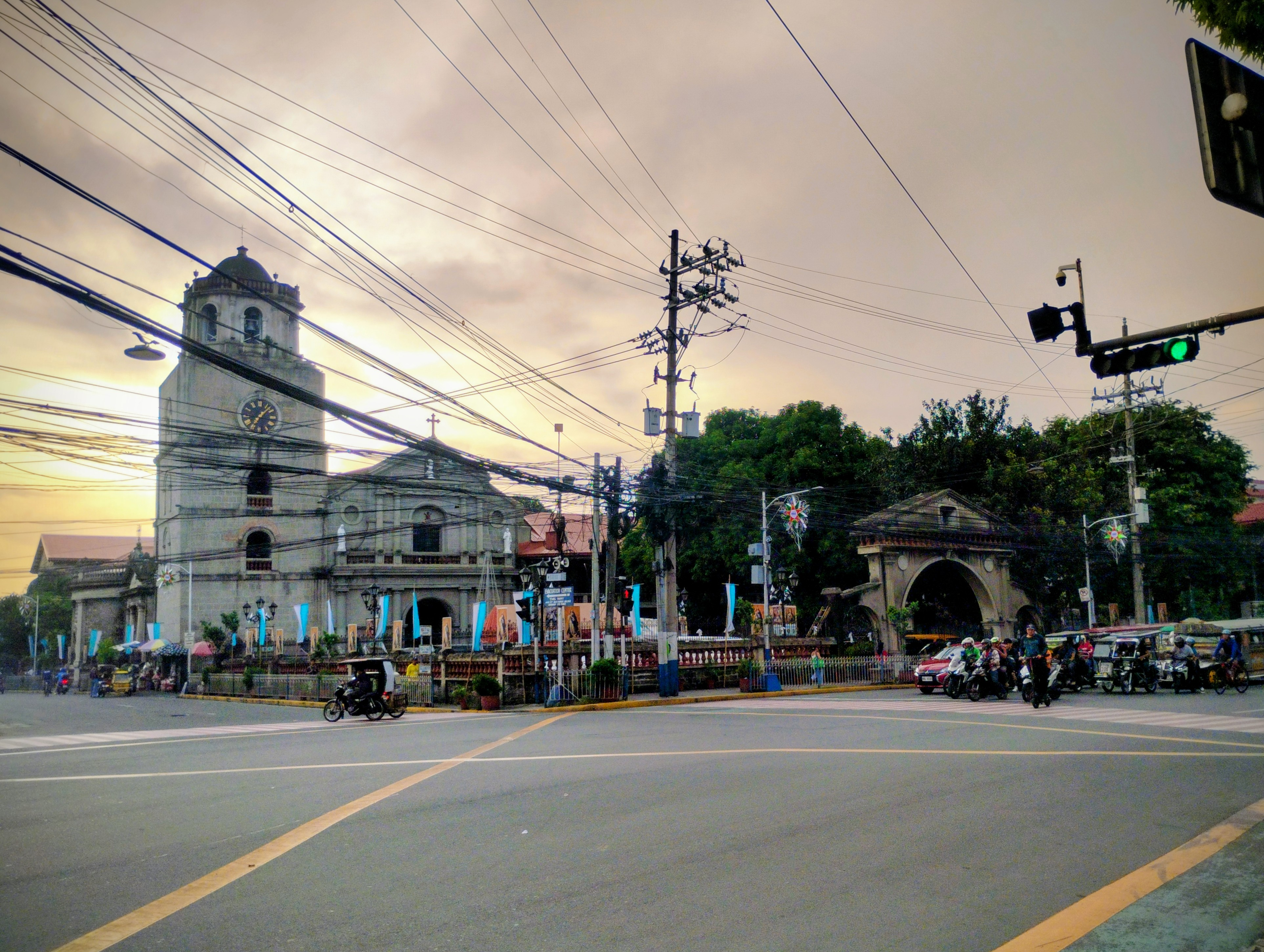
Old center of Pasig near the Pasig Cathedral

The city's name, Pasig, is a Tagalog word which means, "a river that flows into the sea" or "sandy bank of a river".

Etymologically, it is derived from Proto-Malayo-Polynesian *pasiR. Its cognates include Tagalog dalampasigan ("shore"), Pangutaran Sama pasil ("gravel"), and Malay pasir ("beach" or "sand").

== History ==
=== Early history ===
There are no surviving firsthand accounts of the history of Pasig before Spanish colonizers arrived in 1573 and established the settlement, which they called the Ciudad-Municipal de Pasig.

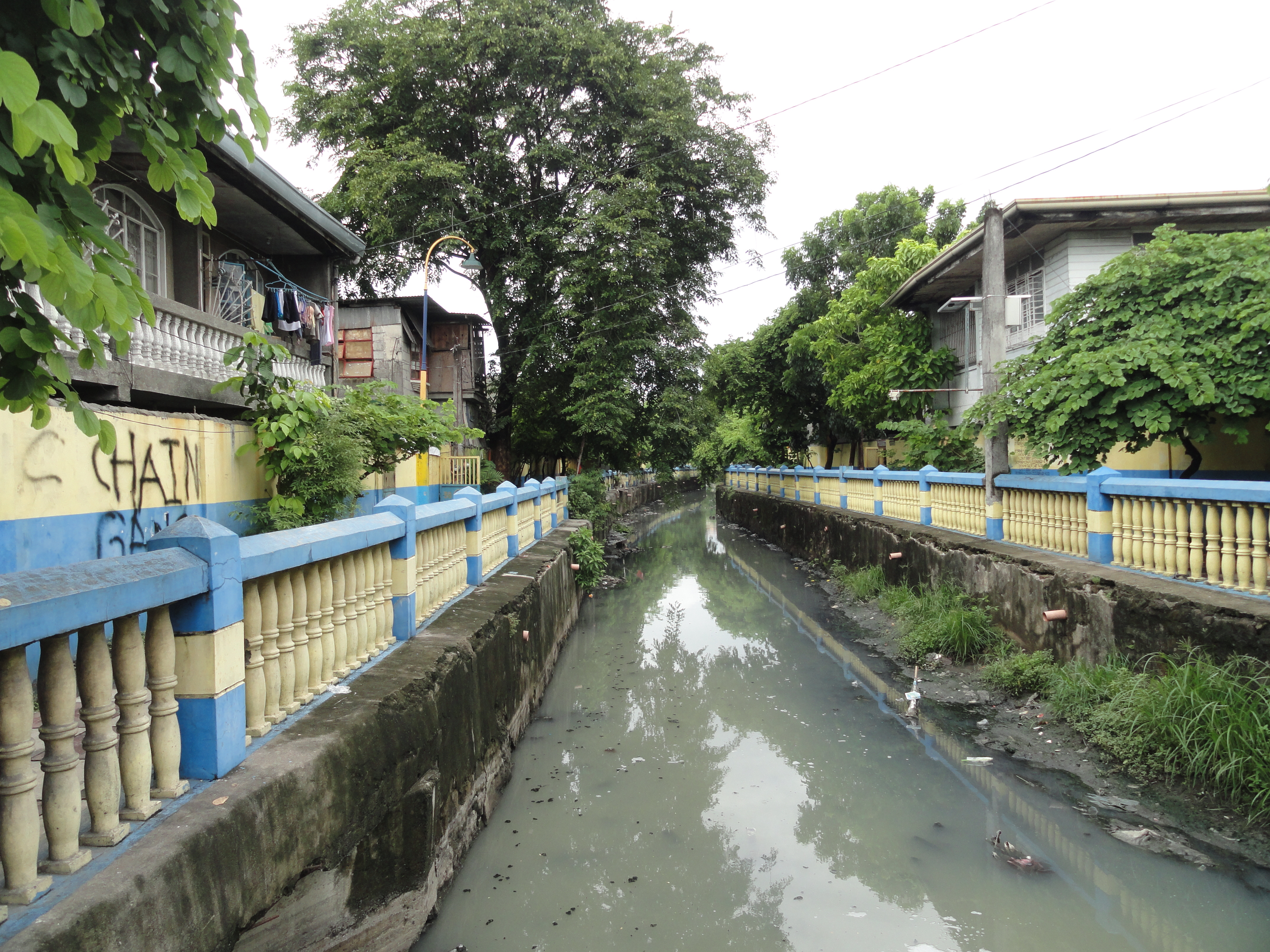
A section of the Bitukang Manok

The creek was given the name Bitukang Manok (Tagalog for "Chicken Gut") due to the serpentine shape of its waterway. Among its early dwellers were Tagalogs and people from South China with origins dating back to the Ming dynasty). The Bitukang Manok was once a principal tributary of the Marikina River. The Spanish colonizers called the creek Rio de Pasig; however, the natives still called it the Bitukang Manok.

The first stretch of the Bitukang Manok became known as the "Pariancillo" (Estero de San Agustin), where its shoreline was once settled by ethnic Chinese and Malay merchants to trade their goods with Tagalogs until it developed up to the 1970s as the city's main public market. Likewise, the creek contributed enormously to the economic growth of Pasig during the Spanish colonial era (1565–1898) through irrigation of its wide paddy fields, and by being the progressive center of barter trade.

The Bitukang Manok, also known as the "Parian Creek," had once linked the Marikina River with the Antipolo. Before the Manggahan Floodway was built in 1986, The Parian Creek was connected to the Sapang Bato-Buli Creek (which serves as the boundary between Pasig's barangays Dela Paz-Manggahan-Rosario-Santa Lucia and the Municipality of Cainta), the Kasibulan Creek (situated at Vista Verde, Barangay San Isidro, Cainta), the Palanas Creek (leaving Antipolo through Barangay Muntindilao), the Bulaw Creek (on Barangay Mambungan, besides the Valley Golf and Country Club), and the Hinulugang Taktak falls of Barangay Dela Paz (fed by the Taktak Creek passing close to the Antipolo Town Square), thus being the detached and long-abandoned Antipolo River.

=== Spanish colonial era ===
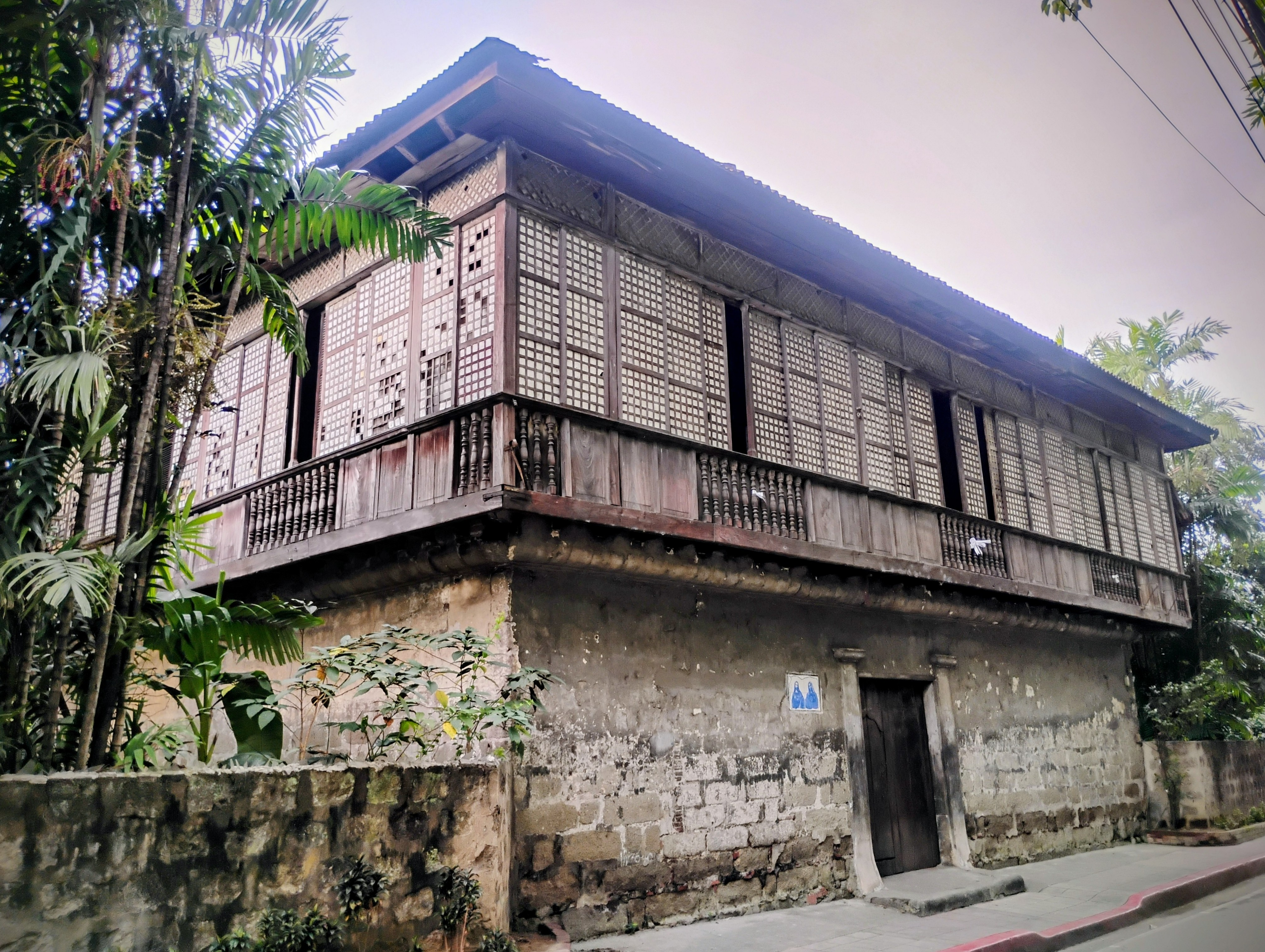
Bahay na Tisa (House of Tile), the oldest existing bahay na bato in Pasig, was built in the 1850s.

Since the early 1600s up to the period of Japanese Imperialism, over a thousand Catholic devotees coming from "Maynilad" (Manila), "Hacienda Pineda" (Pasay), "San Juan del Monte", "Hacienda de Mandaloyon" (Mandaluyong), "Hacienda Mariquina" (Marikina), "Barrio Pateros", "Pueblo de Tagig" (Taguig), and "San Pedro de Macati" (Makati), followed the trail of the Parian Creek to the Pilgrimage Cathedral on the mountainous pueblo of Antipolo, Morong (the present-day Rizal province).

The Antipoleños and several locals from the far-reached barrios of "Poblacion de San Mateo", "Montalban" (Rodriguez), "Monte de Tanhai" (Tanay), "Santa Rosa-Oroquieta" (Teresa), and "Punta Ibayo" (Baras), had also navigated this freshwater creek once to go down to the vast "Kapatagan" (Rice plains) of lowland Pasig. Even the Marian processions of the Our Lady of Peace and Good Voyage passed this route back and forth eleven times.

In the 1600s, Fr. Joaqin Martinez de Zuñiga, conducted a census of Pasig City based on tributes and each tribute representing an average family of 5 to 7, and found that it totalled 3000 tributes, half of which were Indios (Native Filipinos) and the other half were Sangleys (Chinese Filipinos) These tributes were policed by a company of Mexican soldiers under command by a handful of Spanish, patrolling the Pasig river from nearby Fort Santiago which has the Pasig river snake through it. The years: 1636, 1654, 1670, and 1672; saw the deployment of 22, 50, 86, and 81 of these Latin-American soldiers from Mexico at Fort Santiago patrolling along the Pasig. Some of these Mexicans, after being discharged from their duties, had settled in Pasig and other nearby areas. So that they would be close to the Mexico-made image of Our Lady of Peace and Good Voyage in nearby Antipolo. Indian Filipinos (from India) that had later settled in nearby Cainta, Rizal also visit Pasig on their way to the capital.

The creek has been also used during the British Occupation of Manila in 1762 to 1764 by the Royal British army, under the leadership of General William Draper and Vice Admiral Sir Samuel Cornish, 1st Baronet, to transport their red troops (and also the Sepoys they've brought from East India) upstream to take over the nearby forest-surrounded villages of Cainta and Taytay. They even did an ambush at the "Plaza Central" in front of the Pasig Cathedral, and turned the Roman Catholic Parish into their military headquarters, with the church's fortress-like "Campanilla" (belfry) serving as a watchtower against Spanish defenders sailing from the walled city of Intramuros via the Pasig River.

The Sepoys backstabbed their abusive British lieutenants and sided with the combined forces of the Spanish Conquistadors (assigned by the Governor-General Simon de Anda y Salazar), local rice farmers, fisherfolk, and even Chinese traders. After the British Invasion, the Sepoys remained and intermarried with Filipina women, and that explains the Hindu features of some of today's citizens of Pasig, especially Cainta and Taytay.

In 1742, an Augustinian friar named Fray Domingo Diaz, together with a group of wealthy "Mestizos de Sangley" (Chinese Mestizos) from Sagad, ordered a construction of a marble, roof-tiled cover bridge across the creek in the style of an oriental pagoda. It was named "Puente del Pariancillo", and a few years later, it changed to "Puente de Fray Felix Trillo", dedicated to the dynamic parochial curate of the Immaculate Conception Parish. Edmund Roberts visited Pasig in 1832.

On the night of May 2, 1896, more than 300 revolutionary Katipuneros, led by the Supremo Gat. Andres Bonifacio, Emilio Jacinto and Pio Valenzuela, secretly gained access in this very creek aboard a fleet of seventeen "Bangkas" (canoes) to the old residence of a notable Valentin Cruz at Barangay San Nicolas, and formed the "Asamblea Magna" (mass meeting).

Three months later on Saturday evening, August 29, about less than 2,000 working-class Pasigueños (along with a hundred Chinese "Trabajadores" (laborers) who were descendants of the previous rioters & mutineers from the failed Sangley revolts of 1639 and throughout the 17th century), armed with coconuts, machetes and bayoneted muskets (some were donated by the rich Ilustrado families, while many of those guns were looted from Spanish authorities), joined the Katipunan and made a surprise attack at the "Municipio del Gobernadorcillo" (the current site of the Pasig City Hall) and its adjacent garrison of the "Guardias Civil" (Civil Guard), situated near the border of barangays Maybunga and Caniogan.

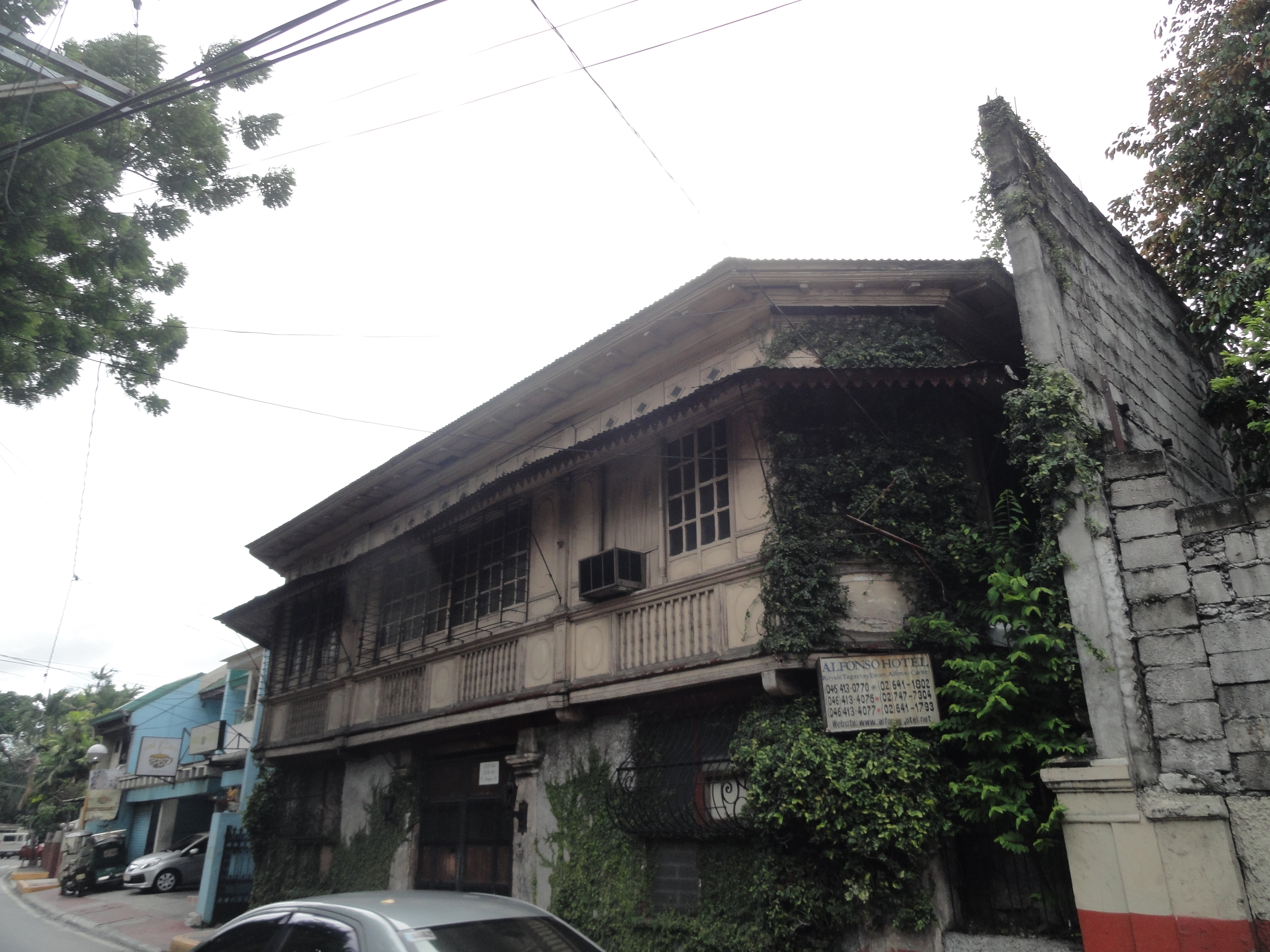
Guanio residence, the site of the "Nagsabado sa Pasig"

That was the first and victorious rebellion ever accomplished by the Katipunan, and that particular event was popularly known as the "Nagsabado sa Pasig" (the Saturday Uprising on Pasig). After they had managed to successfully out-thrown the seat of Spanish government on Pasig, the Katipuneros fled immediately and advanced towards a "Sitio" located at the neighboring "Ciudad de San Juan" called "Pinaglabanan", and there they launched their second attempt to end the numerous cases of corruption made by the greedy Castilian "Encomenderos" (town officials) and "Hacienderos" (landlords), which shall be commemorated as the Battle of San Juan del Monte.

=== American invasion era ===
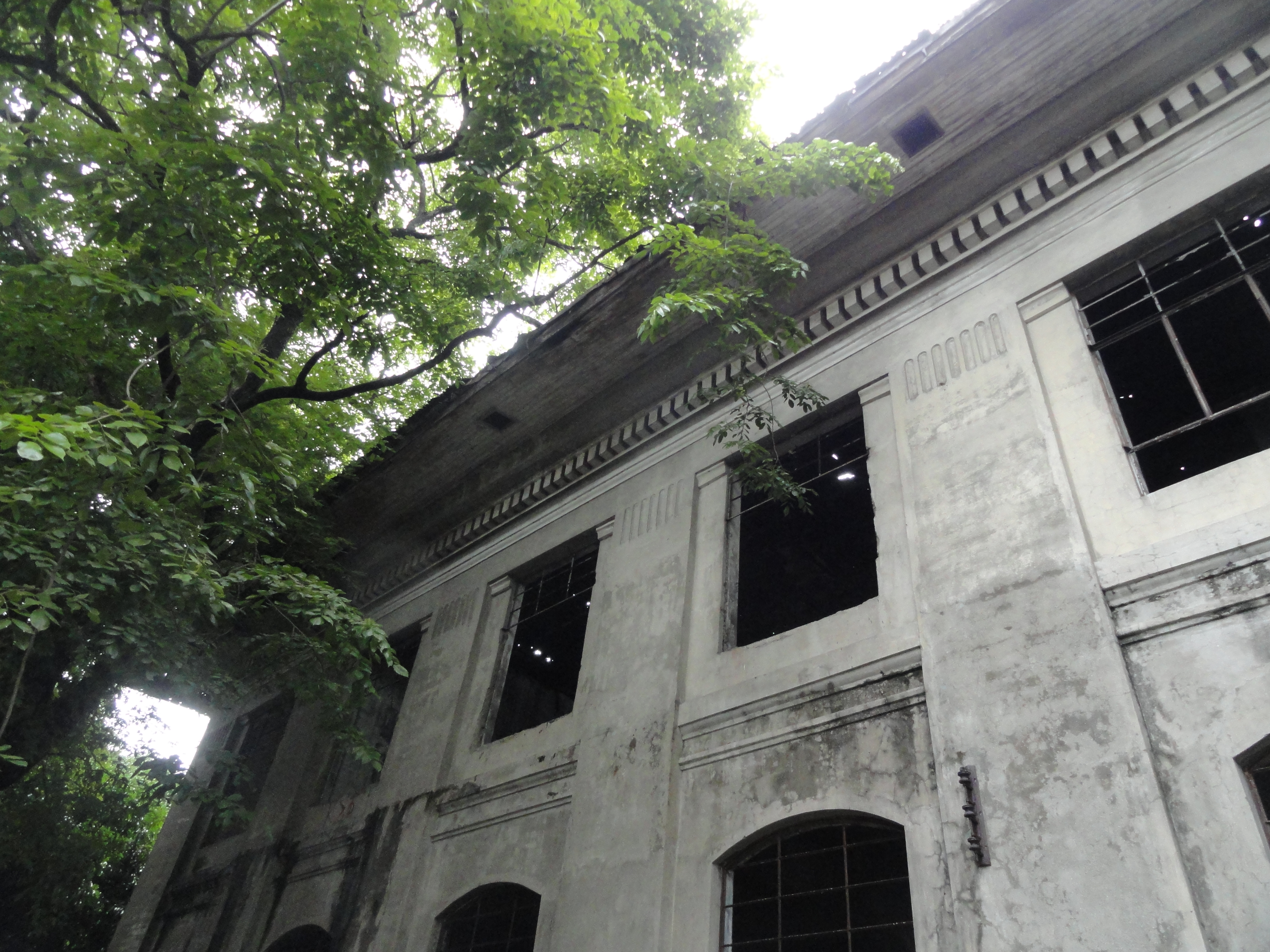
Remains of the American-era capitol building, when Pasig was the capital of Rizal province

On June 11, 1901, during the Philippine–American War, the province of Rizal was created through Act No. 137 of the Philippine Commission. Pasig was incorporated into the province of Rizal, and was designated as the capital of the new province.

In 1939, the barrio or sitio of Ogong (Ugong Norte), which includes the present-day Libis area, was separated from Pasig to form part of the newly established Quezon City.

=== Japanese occupation era ===
After World War II, the Bitukang Manok was slowly exposing its ecological downfall. It resulted in water pollution due to rational ignorance. The worst came to the Bitukang Manok in the late 1960s when the disappearing waterway, instead of being revived was totally separated from the Marikina River, and was converted into an open sewage ditch, with its original flow now moving in reverse towards the direction of the Napindan Channel (a portion of the Pasig River bordering between the barangays Kalawaan-Pinagbuhatan and Taguig), to give way to public commercial facilities.

=== Philippine independence ===
==== The martial law era ====
Pasig was home to a number of prominent human rights advocates who became prominent during the administration of Ferdinand Marcos from 1965 to 1986. One of these advocates was lawyer and publisher Augusto "Bobbit" Sanchez, whose publication The Weekly Post was largely considered uncompromising in its coverage that Pasig politicians came to refer to it as the "Weekly Pest." Another human rights advocate who was an early critic of Marcos' policies was opposition figure and Liberal Party member Jovito Salonga, a Pasig native who was elected representative of Rizal's second district in 1961.

When Ferdinand Marcos' economic policy of using foreign loans to fund government projects during his second term resulted in economic crises at the beginning of the 1970s, numerous Pasigueños participated in the various protests of the time, which eventually came to be known as the First Quarter Storm. This included brothers Eman Lacaba and Pete Lacaba, who lived in nearby Pateros but studied at the Pasig Catholic College (PCC) where their mother was a teacher.

When Marcos suspended the writ of habeas corpus in 1971 and eventually declared martial law in September 1972, students were unable to congregate. In Pasig, one of the prominent residences that sheltered them and allowed them to meet together was the Bahay Na Tisa in Barangay San Jose. Because the house was also the venue of meetings of prominent Pasig leaders who were pro-Marcos, it came to be known as Pasig's "Freedom House." The house has since been declared an Important Cultural Property by the Philippines' National Museum.

Another prominent site in Pasig which was affected by martial law was the Benpres Building, which was shuttered by the Philippine Constabulary when Marcos' declaration closed down all media outlets on September 23, 1972.

After the fall of the dictatorship, one of the first properties to be surrendered by a Marcos crony to the PCGG was the "Payanig sa Pasig" property, at the confluence of Ortigas, Meralco and Doña Julia Vargas Avenues, whose title businessman Jose Yao Campos said he was keeping under the name of the Mid-Pasig Land Development Corp (MPLDC) in lieu of Ferdinand Marcos. This was eventually sequestered by the Presidential Commission on Good Government as part of the Unexplained wealth of the Marcos family.

==== Integration into Metro Manila ====
On November 7, 1975, Pasig was incorporated into Metro Manila when Presidential Decree No. 824 created Metropolitan Manila and the Metropolitan Manila Commission. Pasig was among the municipalities of Rizal placed under the commission's jurisdiction.

=== Cityhood ===
In July 1994, Pasig was converted into a highly urbanized city through Republic Act 7829. And in December 1994, President Fidel V. Ramos signed it into law, which was ratified through a plebiscite on January 21, 1995.

=== Contemporary ===
According to investigative journalist Antonio Montalván II, Mayor Vicente Eusebio assigned every government construction project in Pasig to the construction firms of Pacifico and Sarah Discaya, the latter his niece, during the mid-2000s.

On February 4, 2006, the ULTRA Stampede, in which 71 people died, happened during the first anniversary celebration of ABS-CBN's noontime show Wowowee, because of the prizes that were to be given away. The anniversary of the show would be held on PhilSports Arena but the event has been already cancelled due to the tragedy.

Pasig was one of the areas struck by the high flood created by Typhoon Ondoy (Ketsana) on September 26, 2009, which affected the Ortigas Avenue and the east city side of the Manggahan Floodway. It is the most destructive flood in Philippine history. Pasig is accessed by the Pasig River, wherein the waters of Marikina River channeled and the Manggahan Floodway routed to Laguna de Bay.

In the first week of August 2012, intense monsoon rain caused the 2012 Philippines flooding, which affected again Pasig and particularly the National Capital Region (NCR), Calabarzon and the southwest part of Luzon. The nonstop eight-day monsoon rain, strengthened by Typhoon Gener, caused the Marikina River to overflow and destroyed the same places that were ruined by Typhoon Ondoy in 2009.

On June 19, 2020, President Rodrigo Duterte signed into law Republic Act No. 11475, officially transferring the capital of the Rizal province from Pasig to Antipolo. The law took effect on July 7, 2020, almost 45 years since Pasig became part of Metro Manila and around 11 years since the Rizal provincial government moved to the latter city.

On July 30, 2026, the Pasig City Regional Trial Court, Branch 152 issued a temporary restraining order for a staggered daily wage increase in Metro Manila as approved and ordered by the Department of Labor and Employment (DOLE) four weeks prior, which had taken effect on July 25. The decision was reached following a TRO petition filed by two construction companies. The RTC's issuance of a TRO has received criticism for violating Republic Act No. 6727, or the Wage Rationalization Act, which prohibits courts from issuing any injunction regarding a wage order.

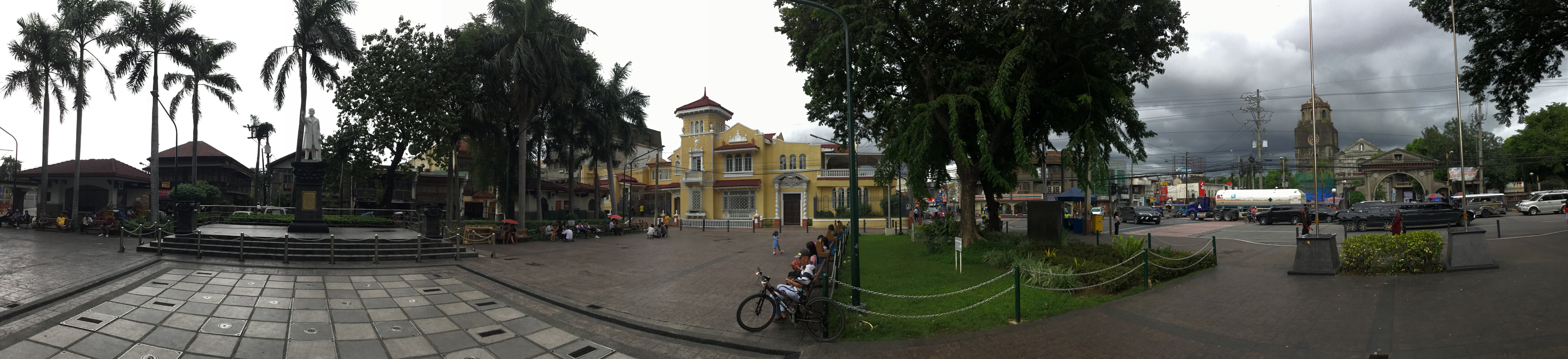
Plaza Rizal in the poblacion area. On the center is Concepción Mansion, while on the far right is Pasig Cathedral.

== Geography ==
Pasig is bordered on the west by Quezon City and Mandaluyong; to the north by Marikina; to the south by Pateros and Taguig; and to the east by the municipalities of Cainta and Taytay in the province of Rizal.

The Pasig River runs through it and forms its southwestern and southeastern borders with Taguig, while the Marikina River forms its western border with Quezon City. The artificial Manggahan Floodway, built in 1986, begins at its confluence with the Marikina River in its northeast.

=== Barangays ===
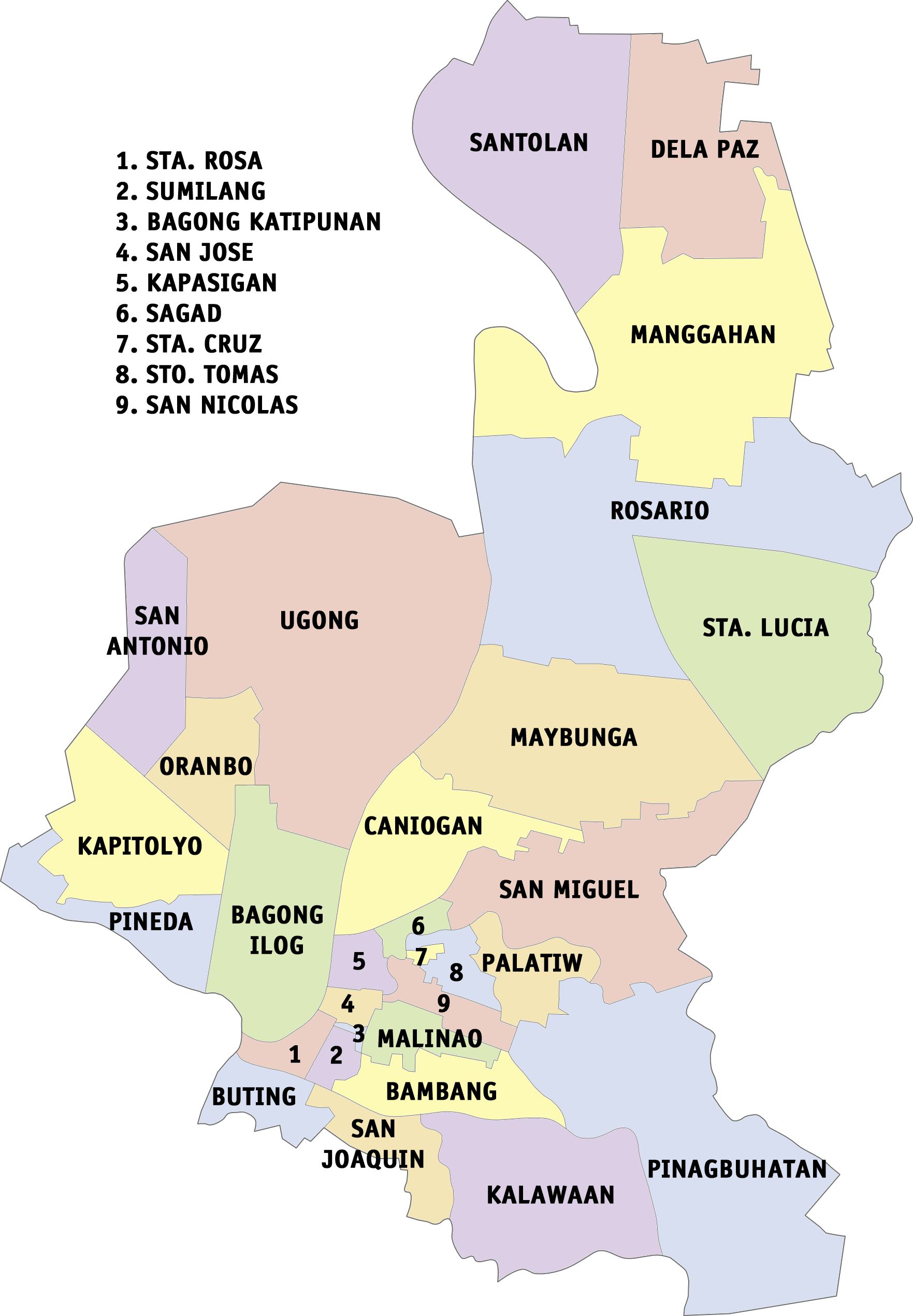
Political map of Pasig

Pasig is politically subdivided into 30 barangays. Its barangays are grouped into two districts for city council representation purposes. The first district encompasses the southern and western sections of the city, while the second district encompasses the northern and eastern sections. Among these barangays, 27 are located on the northern side or right bank of the Pasig River while 3 (Buting, San Joaquin and Kalawaan) are located on the river's southern side or left bank.

Barangays	District	Population	Area (ha)	Density (/ha)
Bagong Ilog	1st	20,344	124.95	124
Bagong Katipunan	1st	879	4.78	248
Bambang	1st	20,801	38.41	501
Buting	1st	10,348	20.33	446
Caniogan	1st	28,084	167.94	130
Dela Paz^{a}	2nd	19,804	199.79	65
Kalawaan	1st	32,145	209.91	112
Kapasigan	1st	4,774	21.15	311
Kapitolyo	1st	9,203	95.24	215
Malinao	1st	4,817	28.02	213
Manggahan^{b}	2nd	88,078	327.03	227
Maybunga	2nd	45,555	177.37	201
Oranbo	1st	3,267	43.61	101
Palatiw	1st	27,499	24.24	698
Pinagbuhatan	2nd	163,598	152.35	692
Pineda	1st	19,499	79.85	188
Rosario	2nd	73,979	414.54	122
Sagad	1st	6,036	12.00	574
San Antonio	1st	11,727	82.07	142
San Joaquin	1st	13,823	45.07	277
San Jose	1st	1,817	9.33	252
San Miguel	2nd	40,199	80.05	376
San Nicolas	1st	2,602	30.38	51
Santa Cruz	1st	5,610	7.28	600
Santa Lucia	2nd	43,749	178.31	227
Santa Rosa	1st	1,015	12.06	126
Santo Tomas	1st	12,904	10.43	611
Santolan	2nd	57,933	199.25	217
Sumilang	1st	4,334	17.18	314
Ugong	1st	28,737	375.38	59
Notes^a Excludes 7,296 persons residing in the area disputed by Barangay San Isidro, Cainta, Rizal.^b Includes population separately enumerated in the 2007 Census as Barangay Napico. Its creation was annulled by the Supreme Court on September 10, 1999. Excludes 3,784 persons in the area disputed by Barangay San Isidro, Cainta, Rizal.

=== Climate ===
The dry season runs through the months of November to April, while the wet season starts in May and lasts to November. The wet season reaches its peak in the month of August. Maximum rainfall in usually occurs from the month of June to September. The average annual of rainfall is 2,014.8 millimeters (79.32 in) with a peak of 420.0 millimeters (16.54 in) in July and a low 26.9 millimeters (1.06 in) in April. The highest temperature occurs during the month of April and May (34 °C (93 °F)) while the lowest occurs during the months of January & February (24 °C (75 °F)).

The Philippines, due to its geographical location, is one of the Asian countries often affected by typhoons. It is located within the so-called "typhoon belt". Generally, typhoon season starts from June and ends in November. However, the rest of the months are not entirely free of the typhoons since they are unpredictable in nature and might enter the country anytime of the year.

Climate data for Pasig
Month	Jan	Feb	Mar	Apr	May	Jun	Jul	Aug	Sep	Oct	Nov	Dec	Year
Mean daily maximum °C (°F)	28 (82)	30 (86)	31 (88)	33 (91)	32 (90)	31 (88)	29 (84)	29 (84)	29 (84)	30 (86)	30 (86)	29 (84)	30 (86)
Mean daily minimum °C (°F)	20 (68)	20 (68)	21 (70)	22 (72)	24 (75)	24 (75)	24 (75)	24 (75)	24 (75)	23 (73)	22 (72)	21 (70)	22 (72)
Average precipitation mm (inches)	7 (0.3)	7 (0.3)	9 (0.4)	21 (0.8)	101 (4.0)	152 (6.0)	188 (7.4)	170 (6.7)	159 (6.3)	115 (4.5)	47 (1.9)	29 (1.1)	1,005 (39.7)
Average rainy days	3.3	3.5	11.1	8.1	18.9	23.5	26.4	25.5	24.5	19.6	10.4	6.4	181.2
Source: Meteoblue (modeled/calculated data, not measured locally)

== Demographics ==
Population growth of Pasig has consistently been higher than the regional average. Thus, the percentage share of Pasig in the total population of Metro Manila has significantly increased. Its share has grown from less than 3% in 1960 to 4.5% in 1980 and then to almost 6% in 2015. Pasig's population is projected to reach one million between the 2025 and 2030 census years.

Population census of Pasig

Year	Pop.	±% p.a.
1903	11,278	—
1918	16,767	+2.68%
1939	27,541	+2.39%
1948	35,407	+2.83%
1960	62,130	+4.80%
1970	156,492	+9.67%

Year	Pop.	±% p.a.
1975	209,915	+6.07%
1980	268,570	+5.05%
1990	397,679	+4.00%
1995	471,075	+3.22%
2000	505,058	+1.50%
2007	627,445	+3.04%

Year	Pop.	±% p.a.
2010	669,773	+2.40%
2015	755,300	+2.32%
2020	803,159	+1.30%
2024	853,050	+1.46%

Source: Philippine Statistics Authority

=== Demonym ===
The demonym for Pasig residents is Pasigueño.

=== Religion ===
The Roman Catholic Diocese of Pasig was established in 2003 by Pope John Paul II as the diocese of the Catholic Church in the Philippines, with the Immaculate Conception Parish (Pasig Cathedral) as the seat.

Pasig is the headquarters of the Presbyterian Church of the Philippines.

== Economy ==
Poverty incidence of Pasig (%)

Source: Philippine Statistics Authority

=== 19th century ===
Historically, Pasig produced rice, fruit and sugarcane as an agricultural town.

=== Today ===
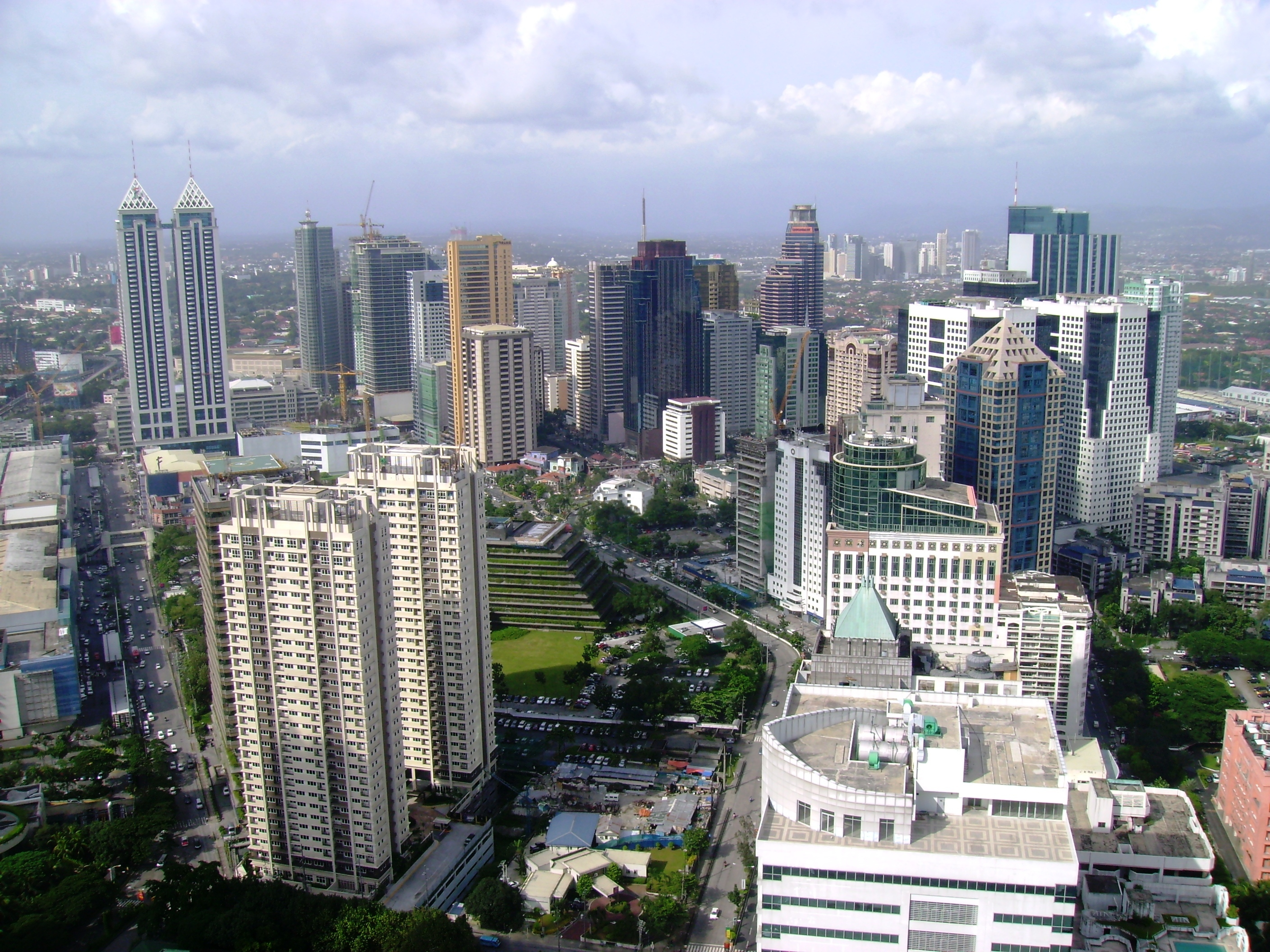
Ortigas Center

Arco de Emperador at Arcovia City

Mandaluyong has the fifth-highest per capita GDP of the country at ₱546,989 (US$10,200).

The western part of the city is where most of Pasig's financial resources are primarily concentrated. It includes numerous factories, warehouses, establishments and commercial facilities. They are primarily situated in Ortigas Center, Pasig proper and along E. Rodriguez Jr. Avenue (C-5) and Ortigas Avenue (R-5 Road). Real estate and commercial developments along Mercedes Avenue and other areas near the city center are developing. The eastern part was mostly dominated by residential areas but numerous commercial establishments are now being developed along Marcos Highway. In the arguably more significant western part of Pasig, east of the city of Mandaluyong and part of the barangay of San Antonio, lies the Ortigas Center.

Ortigas Center is one of the top business districts in the country. Numerous high-rise office buildings, residential condominiums, commercial establishments, schools and malls are situated here. The University of Asia and the Pacific is also located here. The head office of the Integrated Bar of the Philippines was established in the district. The former headquarters of the Philippine Stock Exchange is located along ADB Avenue. San Miguel Corporation, owner of one of the largest producers of beer in Asia, also has its headquarters in the district along San Miguel Avenue. Situated along Ortigas Avenue is Crowne Plaza, a five-star hotel near Robinsons Galleria. Adjacent to Ortigas Center is Capitol Commons, a mixed-use development that was built on the old site of the second Rizal Provincial Capitol.

Notable developments along E. Rodriguez Jr. Avenue (C-5) include Arcovia City, The Grove by Rockwell, and Ortigas East (formerly Frontera Verde), home of the Tiendesitas market. El-Pueblo, a colonial-themed commercial complex in Ortigas Center, provides new concept of cafes, restaurants and bars. Metrowalk (formerly Payanig), a commercial hub along Ortigas Avenue and Meralco Avenue, was established in 2005 and comprises shops, depot warehouses, stalls, restaurants and bars. Bridgetowne Destination Estates, a 31-hectare (77-acre) integrated township development of Robinsons Land, has its Victor Monument and bridge connecting Pasig and Quezon City. Parklinks, a 35-hectare (86-acre) urban estate, is partly built in Pasig near C-5.

== Government ==
The Temporary Pasig City Hall in Bridgetowne.

Pasig City Hall (before its demolition in 2025).

The Pasig Revolving Tower, a city landmark which host a revolving restaurant and the market administration and tourism offices of the city government

=== Local government ===
Pasig is governed primarily by the city mayor, the vice mayor, and the city councilors. The mayor acts as the chief executive of the city, while the city councilors act as its legislative body. The vice mayor, besides taking on mayoral responsibilities in case of a temporary vacancy, acts as the presiding officer of the city legislature. The two city districts have six elected councilors each.

The incumbent mayor is Vico Sotto , while the incumbent vice mayor is Robert Jaworski Jr. as of 2025.

=== City seal ===
The woman represents the Mutya ng Pasig. On the lower left portion is the Pasig Cathedral, the seat of the Roman Catholic Diocese of Pasig. The factory in lower right portion represents the prosperity and progress of the city.

=== List of mayor and vice mayor ===
- Mayor: Victor Ma. Regis N. Sotto (Independent)
- Vice Mayor: Robert Vincent Jude B. Jaworski Jr. (Independent)
- Representative, Lone District: Roman T. Romulo (NPC)

=== List of Members of Sangguniang Panlungsod ng Pasig ===
District 1

- Raymund Francis “Kiko” S. Rustia (NPC)
- Simon Gerard R. Tantoco (NPC)
- Paul Roman C. Santiago (NPC)
- Mark Gil “Volta” M. Delos Santos (Akay)
- Roderick Mario “Eric” U. Gonzales (NPC)
- Paul Angelo “Coach Paul” A. Senogat (AKBYN)

District 2

- Maria Luisa “Angelu” De Leon (Independent)
- Marion Rosalio “Maro” M. Martires (Independent)
- Noel “Buboy” L. Agustin (NPC)
- Warren B. Inocencio (Independent)
- Ronald Allan “Boyie” M. Raymundo (NPC)
- Ryan Enriquez (PDPLBN)

Ex-Officio Officials

- SK Federation President: Keil P. Custillas (Nonpartisan)
- ABC President: Jeronimo R. Alba (Nonpartisan)

== Sports ==
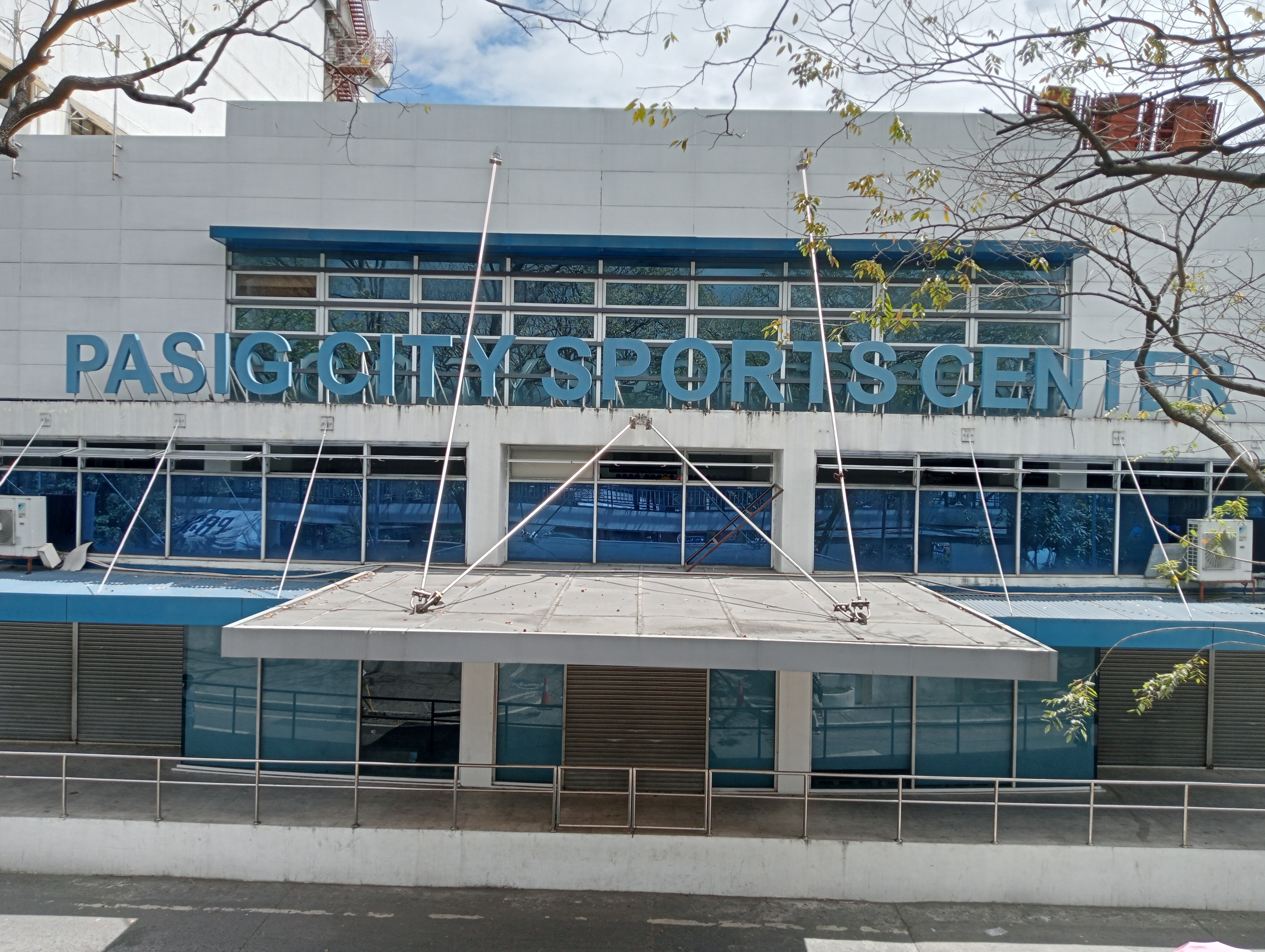
Pasig City Sports Center

The PhilSports Complex, or the Philippine Institute of Sports Complex, is one of the country's notable sports complexes. Located near Meralco Avenue, it is where the offices of the Philippine Sports Commission, Philippine Olympic Committee and some national sports associations are. Its centerpiece is the PhilSports Arena, formerly known as the ULTRA, which hosted games for the Philippine Basketball Association and East Asia Super League among other leagues.

The tentatively-named Home of the UAAP in Bridgetowne, a partnership between the University Athletic Association of the Philippines and Akari Lighting & Technology Corp., will begin construction in 2025 and open in 2027. Other venues in the city include the Ynares Sports Arena as well as the Pasig Sports Center.

As of 2025, the city only has one professional sports team, the Pasig City Maharlika Pilipinas Basketball League team. From 1998 to 2000, the city was home to the team's predecessor, the Pasig Pirates of the Metropolitan Basketball Association.

The city will co-host the inaugural edition of the FIFA Futsal Women's World Cup along with Victorias, Negros Occidental in late 2025.

== Transportation ==
=== Road network ===
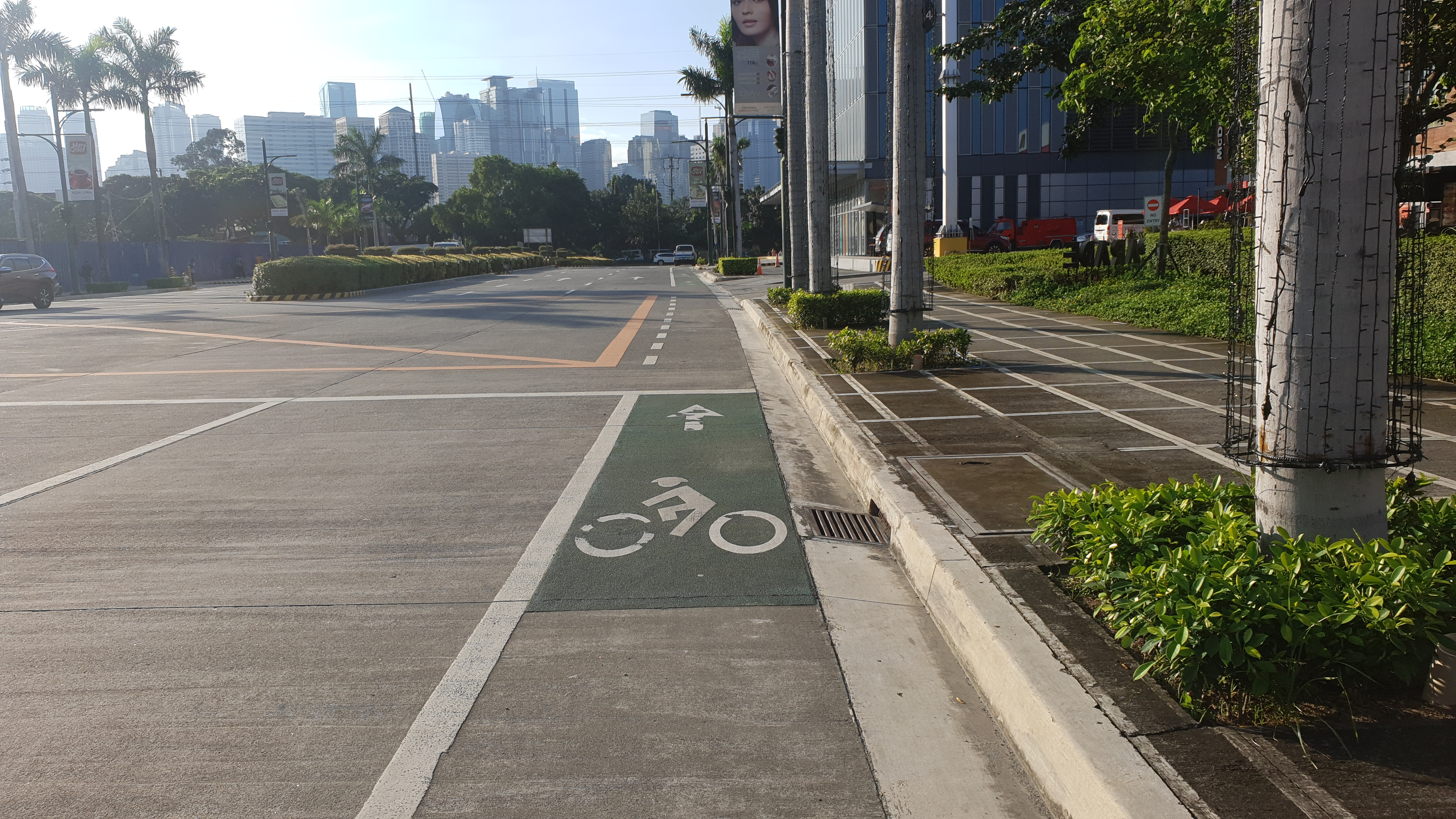
Bicycle lane in Arcovia City.

Pasig is accessed by the following major roads:

- Ortigas Avenue (R-5)
- E. Rodriguez Jr. Avenue (C-5)
- Pasig Boulevard
- Julia Vargas Avenue
- Shaw Boulevard
- Meralco Avenue
- Pioneer Street
- Marcos Highway (Marikina-Infanta Highway)
- Amang Rodriguez Avenue
- ADB Avenue
- San Miguel Avenue

=== Water transportation ===
Pasig is the location of the east end of the Pasig River. It is accessed by Pasig River Ferry Service with 7 stations named after the Barangays of the city beside the river, these are the following:

- Pineda
- San Joaquin
- Bambang
- Kalawaan
- Pinagbuhatan
- Maybunga
- Nagpayong

=== Bridges ===
Pasig is accessed by the Pasig River and the Marikina River. The city has only eleven bridges:

- C.P. Garcia Bridge – crosses the Pasig River
- Kaginhawaan Bridge – crosses the Marikina River
- Manalo Bridge – crosses the Marikina River
- Rosario Bridge – crosses the Marikina River
- Sandoval Bridge – crosses the Marikina River
- Santa Rosa de Lima Bridge – crosses the Marikina River
- Julia Vargas Bridge (parallel bridges) – crosses the Marikina River
- Bambang Bridge – crosses the Napindan Channel
- Napindan Bridge – crosses the Napindan Channel
- Kalawaan Bridge – crosses the Pasig River
- Ortigas Bridge – crosses the Manggahan Floodway
- Manggahan Bridge (Daang Pasig Bridge) – crosses the Manggahan Floodway
- F B Legaspi Bridge – crosses the Manggahan Floodway
- Kaunlaran Bridge – crosses the Pasig River
- Santa Monica–Lawton Bridge – crosses the Pasig River
- Parklinks Bridge – crosses the Marikina River

=== Railway ===
This city is also served by Santolan and Marikina–Pasig Stations of LRT Line 2, albeit being located within the city of Marikina, located along Marcos Highway near the Pasig–Marikina boundary. The line's depot is located in Barangay Santolan, Pasig. The city will also be served by the Metro Manila Subway, which is currently under construction, and MRT Line 4, which has been approved. The Metro Manila Subway will have two stations in Ortigas Center, namely: Ortigas and Shaw Boulevard.

Long before the Manila Light Rail Transit System finally opened its services in the early 2000s, steam train services had once served Pasig in the past, even before World War II.

In Marikina, there is a street named "Daangbakal", also called by the names of "Shoe Avenue Extension", "Munding Avenue" and "Bagong Silang". There is also a similar "Daangbakal" in the San Mateo and Montalban (Rodriguez) areas, and on the maps one can notice that the two roads should have been connected with each other. In fact, as the name suggests in Tagalog, these streets were once a single railway line. The two sides of the "Daangbakal" roads were once connected by a bridge in the San Mateo-Marikina border. However, as the railroad tracks have been largely ignored after the Japanese occupation and was transformed into separate roads, the railway connection was abandoned.

The old railroad tracks, called the Montalban Branch, was connected from Tutuban station in Manila, passing through Tramo (Barangay Rosario, Pasig) coming all the way to the town of Marikina up to Montalban. On the northern end of the "Daangbakal" road in Montablan is a basketball court. That basketball court which stands today, surrounded by the Montalban Catholic Church and Cemetery, was once the railway station terminus of that particular line.

The present-day Santo Niño Elementary School in Marikina was said to be a train depot. And also it was said that a railroad station once stood in the Marikina City Sports Park.

The Montalban Line was completed in 1906, and continued its operation until 1936. It was said that the Imperial Japanese Army made use of this railway line during the Second World War. These railways were dismantled during the 1960s and were converted into ordinary roads.

Today, citizens are dependent on tricycles, jeepneys, taxis, UV Express, buses, and AUV's which contribute to the everyday heavy traffic of Metro Manila. The status of the Northrail project, which connects Manila to northern provinces of Luzon remains uncertain due to alleged irregularities during construction.

Aside from the Montalban Line, another railway branch in the Antipolo Line had existed in the city before it was permanently removed. It traversed from Santa Mesa to Antipolo. There is also a street named "Daangbakal" in Antipolo, where like the "Daangbakal" roads on Marikina and San Mateo, a railway line once existed. Its operation ceased in 1917.

== Education ==
The Schools Division Office (SDO) of Pasig City oversees 44 public schools in the city: 28 elementary schools, 14 high schools, one senior high school (Buting Senior High School), and the Rizal Experimental Station and Pilot School of Cottage Industries (RESPSCI) in Maybunga. Those are geographically divided into ten clusters.

Along C. Raymundo Avenue lies the national headquarters of Parents for Education Foundation, Inc. which runs schools such as PAREF Southridge School, PAREF Woodrose School, PAREF Northfield School, PAREF Rosehill School, and seven other schools.

At the heart of city proper, lies Colegio del Buen Consejo (CBC). It is one of the oldest school in Pasig and one of the educational institutions promulgated by the Roman Catholic Diocese of Pasig.

=== Secondary schools ===
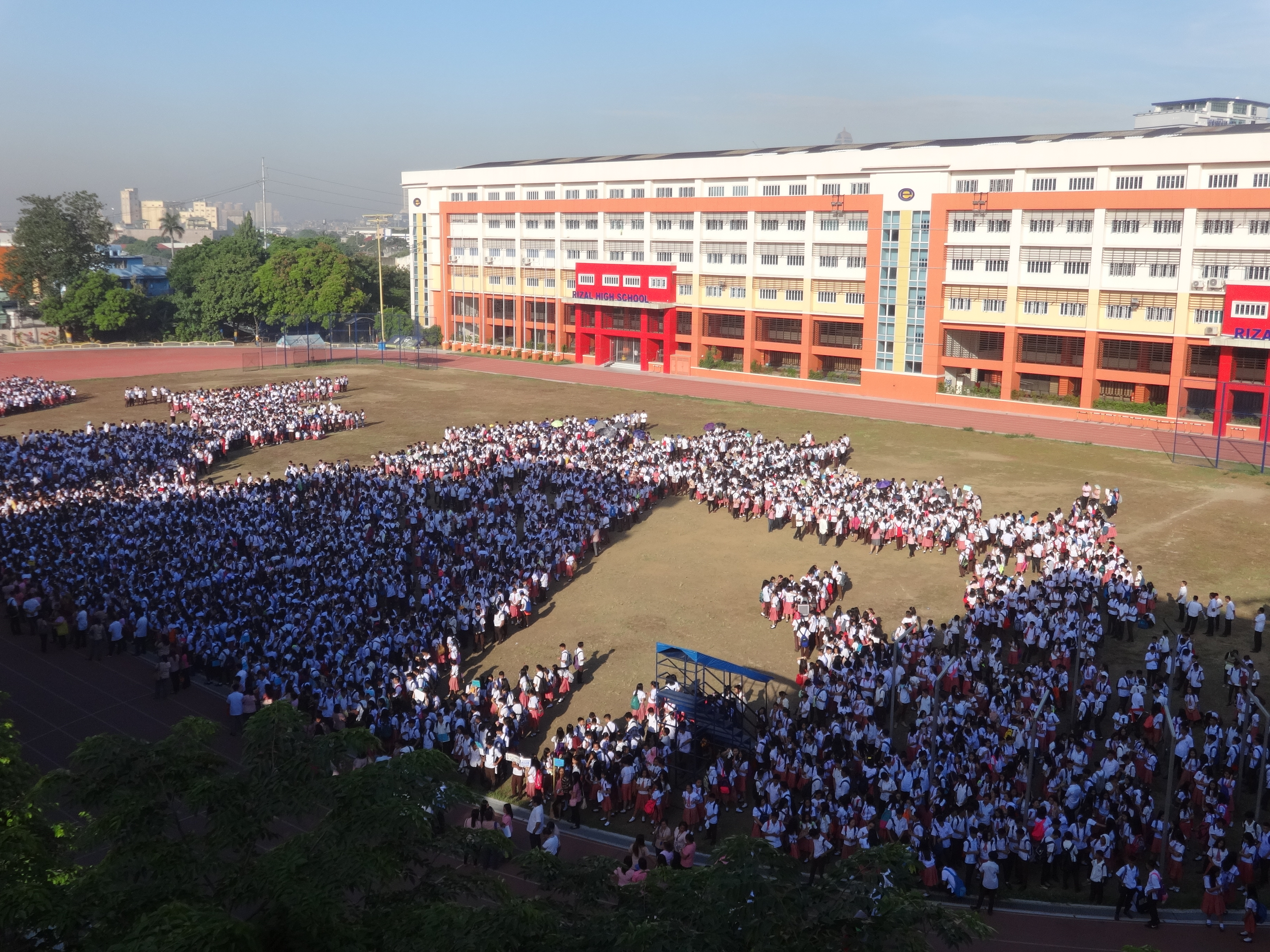
Rizal High School

Pasig Catholic College (PCC) is a private sectarian college located at the heart of Pasig. Established in 1913 as a small school managed by the CICM Fathers headed by Fr. Pierre Cornelis De Brouwer at the present Immaculate Conception Cathedral of Pasig, it is considered as the city's center of Catholic educational institution of the Roman Catholic Diocese of Pasig.

St. Paul College Pasig was near the Philippine Institute of Sports Complex (ULTRA). It was established in 1970 as one of the educational institutions administered by the Congregation of the Sisters of St. Paul of Chartres (SPC).

Pasig City Science High School (PCSHS) is the second science high school in Pasig recognized by the Department of Education for bright students of the city. It is located near the Rainforest Park.

Rizal High School (RHS) is located in Pasig. Named after the Philippine national hero José Rizal, it is one of the world's largest secondary education by student population. Formerly hailed in the Guinness World Records as the largest school by overall enrolled students, it is now surpassed by the City Mississippi School (CMS) in Lucknow, India.

Eusebio High School (EHS) is located in Pasig. The School former name is “Rizal High School Annex” and Named after Mayor Eusebio.

=== Tertiary Schools ===
Pamantasan ng Lungsod ng Pasig, a local university in Kapasigan, offers degree courses for poor, bright and deserving residents of Pasig. It is established during the term of Mayor Vicente Eusebio in 1999.

University of Asia and the Pacific (UA&P) in Ortigas Center traces back to the Center for Research and Communication (CRC) which started by two Harvard graduates in 1967 as an economic and social think-tank institution. Its spiritual and doctrinal formation is entrusted to Opus Dei.

Rizal Technological University (RTU), a state university based in Mandaluyong, has a branch campus located behind Rainforest Park in Pasig City. RTU Pasig campus is established in 1994 that offered different courses in the field of Engineering, Education, Astronomy, Business and Entrepreneurship.

Arellano University, a private university based in Manila, also has its Andres Bonifacio Campus in Barangay Caniogan, Pasig. The 1.29-hectare (3.2-acre) campus was established in 1946.

=== Technical and vocational training ===
MFI Foundation Inc. (formerly Meralco Foundation Institute) was located near the Ortigas Center along Ortigas Avenue. It is established in 1983 to serve and meet the industry's demand for middle-level technical manpower. As a partner of Philippine government's institution of the Technical Education and Skills Development Authority (Philippines) or TESDA, it provided two main programs in the Industrial Technician Program (ITP) which targets the youth and the Technical Training and MFI Training (formerly Testing Program) for skilled workers and professionals.

=== International Schools ===
Domuschola International School is located in Barangay Ugong and offers the International Baccalaureate PYP program for elementary students. Established in 2000 as a pre-school under the name Second Mom, it has expanded to primary and secondary education. The school is in partnership with the TAO Corporation and as of 2015, became a candidate school of the IB Diploma Program.

Saint Gabriel International School along Sandoval Avenue is the sister school of the Chinese-based Manila Xiamen International School. It provides Mandarin Chinese classes and ESL education for local and foreign students.

Another international school that is located in Barangay Ugong is Reedley International School. Established in 1999, this school caters kindergarten to senior high school. The school adapts three curriculars—Singaporean, Filipino, and American.

== Notable personalities ==
- Alexa Ilacad, actress
- Lope K. Santos, novelist, and former senator
- Jovito Salonga, 14th President of the Senate of the Philippines
- Rene Saguisag, former Senator of the Republic (1987-1992)
- Francisco Coching, National Artist of the Philippines for Visual Arts
- Ramon Santos, National Artist of the Philippines for Music
- Susan Fernandez, singer, activist and academic
- Mariano Melendres, 5th Governor of Rizal
- Vico Sotto, politician, incumbent city mayor of Pasig
- Donya Tesoro, politician, incumbent municipal mayor of San Manuel, Tarlac
- Roderick Macutay, visual artist
- JC Jacinto, visual artist
- Atoy Co, actor, basketball player and former 1st district councilor
- Marlou Aquino, basketball player
- Doug Kramer, basketball player
- Rome dela Rosa, basketball player
- Alberto Reynoso, basketball player
- Coney Reyes, veteran actress, commercial model
- John Lloyd Cruz, actor
- Ping Medina, actor
- Sam Milby, actor, singer, model
- Hero Angeles, actor
- Edgar Allan Guzman, actor
- Jerome Ponce, actor
- Arjo Atayde, actor
- Connie Sison, journalist; news anchor
- Aljo Bendijo, broadcast journalist
- Dion Ignacio, actor
- Xian Lim, Filipino Chinese actor, model, singer
- Ely Buendia, lead vocalist for The Eraserheads
- Raymond "Abra" Abracosa, hip hop artist, emcee, singer
- Rachelle Ann Go, singer, famous stage play theater and model
- Belle Mariano, actress and model
- Laarni Lozada, singer
- Kean Cipriano, singer, actor and musician
- RJ Jimenez, acoustic singer
- Ricardo Penson, social activist
- Angelu de Leon, actress and incumbent Pasig councilor
- Roderick Macutay, artist

== Sister cities ==
=== Local ===
- Marikina, Metro Manila
- Dumalag, Capiz

=== International ===
- Marugame, Kagawa, Japan
- South San Francisco, California, United States

== International relations ==
- Paraguay (Consulate)
- Malta (Consulate)

== See also ==
- Legislative district of Pasig
- Roman Catholic Diocese of Pasig
- Pasig City Museum
- Candaba, Pampanga, a place where there is a barangay named Pasig.
- Balabac, Palawan, a place where there is a barangay named Pasig.
- Lambunao, Iloilo, a place where there is a barangay named Pasig.
- Sara, Iloilo, a place where there is a barangay named Pasig.
- List of schools in Pasig

First	Capital of Rizal; 1901–1904	Succeeded by San Felipe Neri
Preceded by San Felipe Neri	Capital of Rizal; 1904–2009 (de facto); 1904–2020 (de jure)	Succeeded by Antipolo
