= Pasig Revolving Tower =

- The building in 2021.
- Interactive map of the Pasig Revolving Tower area
- Former names: Mutya ng Pasig Tower

General information
- Status: Completed
- Type: Mixed-Use
- Location: Pasig, Metro Manila, Philippines
- Coordinates: 14°33′31.9″N 121°04′59.1″E
- Current tenants: Pasig City Market Administration Office; Pasig City Tourism Office; Museum of Local and Modern Art
- Completed: 1974
- Renovated: 2015–2016
- Owner: Pasig city government

Technical details
- Floor count: 12

Design and construction
- Architect: Edward Medina

Renovating team
- Main contractor: Interbelt Construction

The Pasig Revolving Tower is a 12-storey building in Pasig, Metro Manila, Philippines.

== History ==
=== Construction and early years ===
Formerly the Mutya ng Pasig Tower, Pasig Revolving Tower was built as an 11-storey building in 1974 in an area then covered with rice paddies and some houses. The structure was built near the Mutya ng Pasig public market during the administration of then-Pasig Mayor Emiliano Caruncho Jr.. It features a revolving restaurant on the then-topmost floor, one of the two existing revolving restaurants in the Metro Manila area at that time; the other dining outlet was at the Manila Royal Hotel in Quiapo, Manila which is already defunct.

=== Deterioration and disuse ===
The national economic crisis that followed the Assassination of Ninoy Aquino in 1983, caused tenants occupying the building to be unable to pay rent to the Pasig government. For the next several years, only the first three floors of the Pasig Revolving Tower was occupied, mainly by local department offices. It also served as a storage facility for the nearby market.

=== Renovation ===
Mayor Robert Eusebio, an architecture graduate, commissioned an architectural and structural study of the Pasig Revolving Tower in 2006 with the intent of renovating the building. The study was finished in 2008.

Renovation works on the tower began in 2015 under the tenure of Mayor Maribel Eusebio, Robert's wife and an architect. The main contractor of the renovation was Interbelt Construction which facilitated the addition of a 12th floor and a viewing deck. Majority of the changes was the interior designs per floor and the revolving restaurant was retained on the eleventh floor. It was finished within 2016, during Robert Eusebio's second non-consecutive term which started in the same year, and was re-inaugurated on November 18, 2016.

In 2024, Mayor Vico Sotto unveiled plans for a new city hall complex which will have the Pasig Revolving Tower as its centerpiece. The contract signing was made on January 12, 2025.

== Architecture and design ==
The Pasig Revolving Tower is a 12-storey Brutalist building designed by architect Edward Medina of Pasig. Despite its name it is not a tower, due to having occupiable floors. The highest floor and viewing deck was added during the mid-2010s renovation. The platform structure at the 11th floor rotates at a rate of one hour and fifteen minutes.

== Tenants ==
The Pasig Revolving Tower is a government building hosting the city government's Market Administration and Tourism offices and the Museum of Local and Modern Art (MOLMA). The revolving restaurant is situated on the 11th floor. There are other rentable commercial spaces within the tower which accommodates law offices.
