= Magpasikat =

Talent competition segment of the variety show, It's Showtime

- Genre: Talent show
- Created by: ABS-CBN
- Directed by: Bobet Vidanes (2009–2020); Boyet Baldemor (2020); Jon Moll (since 2021); Arnel Natividad (since 2025)
- Presented by: It's Showtime hosts
- Country of origin: Philippines

Production
- Production locations: ABS-CBN Broadcasting Center, Quezon City, Philippines: Studio 2 (2009–2012); Studio 3 (2012–2018; 2022—2023); Studio 10 (2020–2021; 2024); Newport Performing Arts Theater, Pasay City, Philippines (2019)
- Camera setup: Multiple-camera setup
- Production company: ABS-CBN Studios

Original release
- Network: ABS-CBN
- Release: October 23, 2010 – October 26, 2019
- Network: Kapamilya Channel (Note: Following the cease-and-desist order against ABS-CBN's free-to-air assets, the show moved to Kapamilya Channel, with simulcast on A2Z (since October 10, 2020), Jeepney TV (June 11, 2018 – April 5, 2024), TV5 (July 16, 2022 – June 30, 2023), GTV (July 1, 2023 – December 31, 2024), GMA Network (since April 6, 2024) and All TV (since June 17, 2024).)
- Release: October 31, 2020 – present

Magpasikat (lit. Show-Off) is an annual anniversary segment of the Philippine noontime variety show It's Showtime. First held in 2010 as a talent competition where the show's hosts and cast members competing in teams to showcase creative and performance-based productions, it is typically held as a week-long anniversary special, either during or leading up to the show's anniversary on October 24.

Jugs Jugueta and Teddy Corpuz held the record for the most Magpasikat wins, with six victories. They are followed by Karylle with five wins, and both Jhong Hilario and Kim Chiu with four each.

Team Ogie, Kim, MC, and Lassy emerged as final winners under the traditional format in 2024, as it switched to special performances, special segments and an awards segment named It's Showtime AWAAARD!, since 2025, due to the high costs of the performances.

== Background ==
Magpasikat was first held on October 23, 2010, as part of It's Showtime's first anniversary celebration. It has since become an annual week-long tradition commemorating the show's anniversary. Exceptions occurred in 2020 and 2021, when the segment was held as a single-day event due to restrictions caused by the COVID-19 pandemic.

The name Magpasikat was also previously used in January 2010 as a temporary replacement for Showtime after it was suspended by the Movie and Television Review and Classification Board (MTRCB). The suspension followed a controversial remark made by guest judge Rosanna Roces regarding teachers. This interim program retained the original format but featured celebrity contestants. It aired only for a few days before Showtime resumed broadcast under a temporary restraining order.

== Format ==
The It's Showtime cast and staff are typically divided into five teams through a random draw, which also determines the order of performances. Teams perform daily from Monday to Friday, with results announced on Saturday by either the voice of Big Brother, a panel of judges, or ABS-CBN COO for Broadcast Cory Vidanes. A panel of guest hurados (judges) evaluates each performance. The team with the highest average score is awarded the top cash prize for their chosen beneficiary, while the remaining teams receive consolation prizes.

== Series overview ==
=== Results by year ===
Year	Champion(s)	Other Teams		Judges	Ref.
2010	Team Jugs and Teddy	—N/a	Team Anne, Team Kuya Kim, Team Vhong, Team Vice	Arnel Pineda, Gary Valenciano, Gerald Anderson, Gladys Reyes, Kim Chiu, Luis Manzano	
2011	Team Anne	2nd	Team Billy, Team Vice	Cathy Garcia-Molina, Joel Cruz, Liz Uy, Manny Calayan, Vicki Belo	
2011	Team Anne	—N/a	Team Karylle, Team Vhong, Team Kuya Kim, Team Jugs and Teddy	Cathy Garcia-Molina, Joel Cruz, Liz Uy, Manny Calayan, Vicki Belo	
2012	Team Anne and Karylle; Team Jugs and Teddy; Team Vhong and Billy	—N/a	Team Coleen and Eruption, Team Kuya Kim and Ryan, Team Vice and Jhon	Alfie Lorenzo, Cornelia Lee, Eula Valdez, Jericho Rosales, Maricel Soriano	
2013	Team Karylle, Jugs, and Teddy	2nd	Team Vice and Kuya Kim	Ai-Ai delas Alas, Amy Perez, Isay Alvarez, Robert Seña, Ruffa Gutierrez	
2013	Team Karylle, Jugs, and Teddy	3rd	Team Vhong, Billy, and Coleen	Ai-Ai delas Alas, Amy Perez, Isay Alvarez, Robert Seña, Ruffa Gutierrez	
2013	Team Karylle, Jugs, and Teddy	—N/a	Team Anne and Jhong	Ai-Ai delas Alas, Amy Perez, Isay Alvarez, Robert Seña, Ruffa Gutierrez	
2014	Team Billy, Jugs, and Teddy	2nd	Team Karylle and Jhong	Cherie Gil, Jim Paredes, Pops Fernandez	
2014	Team Billy, Jugs, and Teddy	3rd	Team Anne, Kuya Kim, and Eruption	Cherie Gil, Jim Paredes, Pops Fernandez	
2014	Team Billy, Jugs, and Teddy	—N/a	Team Vhong and Ryan, Team Billy and Coleen	Cherie Gil, Jim Paredes, Pops Fernandez	
2015	Team Vice, Jugs, and Teddy	2nd	Team Karylle and Jhong	Amy Perez and Marc Logan, Nonong de Andres and Lilia Cuntapay, Tirso Cruz III and Edgar Mortiz	
2015	Team Vice, Jugs, and Teddy	3rd	Team Anne, Kuya Kim, and Eruption	Amy Perez and Marc Logan, Nonong de Andres and Lilia Cuntapay, Tirso Cruz III and Edgar Mortiz	
2015	Team Vice, Jugs, and Teddy	—N/a	Team Vhong and Ryan	Amy Perez and Marc Logan, Nonong de Andres and Lilia Cuntapay, Tirso Cruz III and Edgar Mortiz	
2016	Team Anne, Amy Perez, and Joey	2nd	Team Vhong and Jhong	Jolina Magdangal, Mel Villena, Nick Olanka, Precious Lara Quigaman, Sonny Angara	
2016	Team Anne, Amy Perez, and Joey	3rd	Team Karylle, Jugs, Teddy, and Mariel	Jolina Magdangal, Mel Villena, Nick Olanka, Precious Lara Quigaman, Sonny Angara	
2016	Team Anne, Amy Perez, and Joey	4th	Team Vice and Kuya Kim	Jolina Magdangal, Mel Villena, Nick Olanka, Precious Lara Quigaman, Sonny Angara	
2016	Team Anne, Amy Perez, and Joey	5th	Team Billy and Ryan	Jolina Magdangal, Mel Villena, Nick Olanka, Precious Lara Quigaman, Sonny Angara	
2017	Team Vhong	2nd	Team Vice, Jugs, and Teddy	Ina Raymundo, Janno Gibbs, Marc Logan, Maricel Soriano, Rory Quintos	
2017	Team Vhong	3rd	Team Karylle and Jhong	Ina Raymundo, Janno Gibbs, Marc Logan, Maricel Soriano, Rory Quintos	
2017	Team Vhong	4th	Team Anne, Ryan, and Nadine	Ina Raymundo, Janno Gibbs, Marc Logan, Maricel Soriano, Rory Quintos	
2017	Team Vhong	5th	Team Billy, Amy, and James	Ina Raymundo, Janno Gibbs, Marc Logan, Maricel Soriano, Rory Quintos	
2018	Team Karylle and Jhong	2nd	Team Vice and Amy	Empoy Marquez, Gus Abelgas, Mariz Ricketts, Rey "PJ" Abellana, Ronnie Ricketts, Shalani Soledad-Romulo	
2018	Team Karylle and Jhong	3rd	Team Anne and Mariel	Empoy Marquez, Gus Abelgas, Mariz Ricketts, Rey "PJ" Abellana, Ronnie Ricketts, Shalani Soledad-Romulo	
2018	Team Karylle and Jhong	4th	Team Vhong and Ryan	Empoy Marquez, Gus Abelgas, Mariz Ricketts, Rey "PJ" Abellana, Ronnie Ricketts, Shalani Soledad-Romulo	
2018	Team Karylle and Jhong	5th	Team Jugs and Teddy	Empoy Marquez, Gus Abelgas, Mariz Ricketts, Rey "PJ" Abellana, Ronnie Ricketts, Shalani Soledad-Romulo	
2019	Team Vice	2nd	Team Vhong and Mariel	Andy Alviz, Diether Ocampo, Edu Manzano, Joel Cruz, Maria Rachel Arenas, Rene Napeñas, Shirley Halili-Cruz, Tim Yap, Tina Monzon-Palma, Vicki Belo	
2019	Team Vice	3rd	Team Anne and Amy	Andy Alviz, Diether Ocampo, Edu Manzano, Joel Cruz, Maria Rachel Arenas, Rene Napeñas, Shirley Halili-Cruz, Tim Yap, Tina Monzon-Palma, Vicki Belo	
2019	Team Vice	4th	Team Karylle and Ryan	Andy Alviz, Diether Ocampo, Edu Manzano, Joel Cruz, Maria Rachel Arenas, Rene Napeñas, Shirley Halili-Cruz, Tim Yap, Tina Monzon-Palma, Vicki Belo	
2019	Team Vice	5th	Team Jhong, Jugs, and Teddy	Andy Alviz, Diether Ocampo, Edu Manzano, Joel Cruz, Maria Rachel Arenas, Rene Napeñas, Shirley Halili-Cruz, Tim Yap, Tina Monzon-Palma, Vicki Belo	
2020	Team Karylle, Jhong, and Ion; Team Jugs, Teddy, and Ryan; Team Vhong, Amy, and Jackie; Team Vice and Kim	—N/a		—N/a	
2021	Team Karylle, Amy, and Kim	2nd	Team Vice, Ryan, and Jackie	Catriona Gray, Gary Valenciano, Joel Torre, Raimund Marasigan	
2021	Team Karylle, Amy, and Kim	3rd	Team Vhong and Ogie, Team Jugs, Teddy, and Ion	Catriona Gray, Gary Valenciano, Joel Torre, Raimund Marasigan	
2022	Team Jhong and Ryan	2nd	Team Vice and Amy	Baron Geisler, Darren Espanto, Ernie Lopez, Janice de Belen, John Arcilla, Pia Magalona	
2022	Team Jhong and Ryan	3rd	Team Karylle and Ogie	Baron Geisler, Darren Espanto, Ernie Lopez, Janice de Belen, John Arcilla, Pia Magalona	
2022	Team Jhong and Ryan	4th	Team Anne, Jackie, and Ion	Baron Geisler, Darren Espanto, Ernie Lopez, Janice de Belen, John Arcilla, Pia Magalona	
2022	Team Jhong and Ryan	5th	Team Jugs, Teddy, and Kim	Baron Geisler, Darren Espanto, Ernie Lopez, Janice de Belen, John Arcilla, Pia Magalona	
2023	Team Jhong, Kim, and Ion	2nd	Team Anne, Ryan, and Ogie	apl.de.ap, Barbie Forteza, Jett Pangan, Olivia Lamasan, Tirso Cruz III	
2023	Team Jhong, Kim, and Ion	3rd	Team Vhong, Jugs, and Teddy	apl.de.ap, Barbie Forteza, Jett Pangan, Olivia Lamasan, Tirso Cruz III	
2023	Team Jhong, Kim, and Ion	4th	Team Vice, Jackie, and Cianne	apl.de.ap, Barbie Forteza, Jett Pangan, Olivia Lamasan, Tirso Cruz III	
2023	Team Jhong, Kim, and Ion	5th	Team Karylle, Amy, MC, and Lassy	apl.de.ap, Barbie Forteza, Jett Pangan, Olivia Lamasan, Tirso Cruz III	
2024	Team Ogie, Kim, MC, and Lassy	2nd	Team Jhong, Jackie, and Cianne	Alice Dixson, Donny Pangilinan, Freddie M. Garcia, Gabbi Garcia, Rory Quintos	
2024	Team Ogie, Kim, MC, and Lassy	3rd	Team Anne, Jugs, and Teddy	Alice Dixson, Donny Pangilinan, Freddie M. Garcia, Gabbi Garcia, Rory Quintos	
2024	Team Ogie, Kim, MC, and Lassy	4th	Team Vice, Karylle, and Ryan	Alice Dixson, Donny Pangilinan, Freddie M. Garcia, Gabbi Garcia, Rory Quintos	
2024	Team Ogie, Kim, MC, and Lassy	5th	Team Vhong, Amy, Ion, and Darren	Alice Dixson, Donny Pangilinan, Freddie M. Garcia, Gabbi Garcia, Rory Quintos	
2025-present	The 2025 and later editions of Magpasikat transitioned away from the traditional competitive group format and replaced by entertainment segments.				

=== Results per individual performer/duo ===
- Winner
- Second Place
- Third place
- Fourth place
- Fifth place
- Unknown (?)

Rank	Performer(s)	Wins	Year														
Rank	Performer(s)	Wins	2010	2011	2012	2013	2014	2015	2016	2017	2018	2019	2020	2021	2022	2023	2024
1st	Jugs Jugueta and Teddy Corpuz	6	1st	?	1st				3rd	2nd	5th		1st	3rd	5th	3rd	
2nd	Karylle	5	—N/a	?	1st		?	2nd	3rd		1st	4th	1st		3rd	5th	4th
3rd	Jhong Hilario	4	—N/a		?		2nd			3rd	1st	5th	1st	—N/a	1st		2nd
3rd	Kim Chiu	4	—N/a										1st		5th	1st	
5th	Amy Perez	3	—N/a						1st	5th	2nd	3rd	1st		2nd	5th	
5th	Anne Curtis	3	?	1st		?	3rd		1st	4th	3rd		—N/a		4th	2nd	3rd
5th	Vhong Navarro	3	?		1st	3rd	2nd	?	2nd	1st	4th	2nd	1st	3rd	—N/a	3rd	5th
5th	Vice Ganda	3	?	2nd	?	2nd	?	1st	4th	2nd		1st		2nd		4th	
9th	Billy Crawford	2	—N/a	2nd	1st	3rd	1st	?	5th		—N/a						
9th	Ion Perez	2	—N/a										1st	3rd	4th	1st	5th
9th	Ryan Bang	2	—N/a		?				5th	4th			1st	2nd	1st	2nd	4th
12th	Jackie Gonzaga	1	—N/a										1st	2nd	4th		2nd
12th	Joey Marquez	1	—N/a						1st	—N/a							
12th	Lassy Marquez and MC Calaquian	1	—N/a													5th	1st
12th	Ogie Alcasid	1	—N/a											3rd		2nd	1st
16th	Cianne Dominguez	0	—N/a													4th	2nd
16th	Coleen Garcia	0	—N/a		?	3rd		?	—N/a								
16th	Darren Espanto	0	—N/a														5th
16th	Eric "Eruption" Tai	0	—N/a		?		—N/a	3rd	—N/a								
16th	James Reid	0	—N/a							5th	—N/a						
16th	Kim Atienza	0	?			2nd	?	3rd	4th	—N/a							
16th	Mariel Rodriguez-Padilla	0	—N/a						3rd	—N/a	3rd	2nd	—N/a				
16th	Nadine Lustre	0	—N/a							4th	—N/a						

== Competition ==
Color Key

- Winner
- Second Place
- Third place
- Fourth place
- Fifth place

=== Magpasikat 2010 ===
The first edition of Magpasikat was held on October 23, 2010, featuring five teams: Team Jugs and Teddy, Team Kuya Kim, Team Anne, Team Vhong, and Team Vice. The judging panel included Luis Manzano, Gladys Reyes, Arnel Pineda, Gary Valenciano, Kim Chiu, and Gerald Anderson.

Jugs Jugueta and Teddy Corpuz were declared the inaugural winners.

List of Magpasikat 2010 performances and results
Group	Performance description	Result	Watch	Ref.
Team Jugs and Teddy	Teddy Corpuz and Jugs Jugueta staged a rock concert with Yeng Constantino, Tutti Caringal, Marc Abaya, and Kean Cipriano, plus a Bamboo impersonation.	Grand Champion	Video	
Team Kuya Kim	Kim Atienza performed Mga Kababayan Ko with Alessandra de Rossi, Gloc-9, and the Antipolo Kid Rappers.	Unknown	Video	
Team Anne	Anne Curtis sang Love the Way You Lie, Hot n Cold, and an operatic Telephone with Led Sobrepeña III, Bugoy Drilon, and Robert Seña.	Unknown	Video	
Team Vhong	Vhong Navarro led a dance showdown with Archie Alemania, Jhong Hilario, Izzy Canillo, and Bugoy Cariño.	Unknown	Video	
Team Vice	Vice Ganda did a pageant-themed number with Lara Quigaman, Miriam Quiambao, and closed with Beautiful.	Unknown	Video	

=== Magpasikat 2011 ===
The second Magpasikat anniversary special was held during the week of October 17, 2011, featuring seven teams: Team Karylle, Team Billy, Team Anne, Team Vhong, Team Kuya Kim, Team Vice, and Team Jugs and Teddy. This edition marked the Magpasikat debuts of Karylle and Billy Crawford, who had joined It's Showtime as regular hosts earlier that year. The judging panel included Cathy Garcia-Molina, fashion stylist Liz Uy, entrepreneur Joel Cruz, celebrity doctor Manny Calayan, and Vicki Belo.

Anne Curtis was declared the winner, earning her first Magpasikat victory, while Billy Crawford and Vice Ganda were named runners-up.

List of Magpasikat 2011 performances and results
Group	Performance description	Result	Watch	Ref.
Team Karylle (October 18, Tuesday)	Karylle delivered a performance that combined a disc jockey set, hip-hop dance, and live percussion.	Unknown	Video	
Team Billy (October 18, Tuesday)	Billy Crawford opened with a dance number that transitioned into a magic act, ending with a surprise appearance by German Moreno.	2nd Place (tie) Average Score: 9.8	Video	
Team Anne (October 19, Wednesday)	Anne Curtis performed a pole and aerial silk routine while singing live, including Someone Like You and I Don't Want to Miss a Thing.	Grand Champion Average Score: 10	Video	
Team Vhong (October 19, Wednesday)	Vhong Navarro presented a Cinderella-inspired dance number set to Grenade, featuring guest appearances by Toni Gonzaga and Ryan Bang.	Unknown	Video	
Team Kuya Kim (October 20, Thursday)	Kim Atienza performed a musical mash-up of Yesterday and Do-Re-Mi, concluding with Do Bidoo alongside APO Hiking Society.	Unknown	Video	
Team Vice (October 20, Thursday)	Vice Ganda starred in a No Other Woman-inspired skit with Pooh and Chokoleit, ending with an interpretive dance and surprise appearance by Derek Ramsay.	2nd Place (tie) Average Score: 9.8	Video	
Team Jugs and Teddy (October 21, Friday)	Jugs Jugueta and Teddy Corpuz staged a futuristic battle between two rival teams.	Unknown	Video	

=== Magpasikat 2012 ===
The third Magpasikat anniversary special was held during the week of October 22, 2012, with six teams competing: Team Anne & Karylle; Team Jugs & Teddy; Team Kuya Kim & Ryan; Team Coleen, Eruption & Baby Joy; Team Vice & Jhong; and Team Billy & Vhong. This edition marked the Magpasikat debuts of Jhong Hilario, Ryan Bang, Coleen Garcia, and Eric "Eruption" Tai. It was also the only appearance of "Showtime Baby" Joy Rendon. The judging panel included Alfie Lorenzo, Cornelia Lee, Eula Valdez, Maricel Soriano, and Jericho Rosales.

Teams Anne & Karylle, Jugs & Teddy, and Billy & Vhong received perfect scores and were declared co-champions—the first time multiple winners were named. This marked the second win for Jugs Jugueta, Teddy Corpuz, and Anne Curtis, and the first for Karylle, Billy Crawford, and Vhong Navarro.

List of Magpasikat 2012 performances and results
Group	Performance description	Result	Watch	Ref.
Team Anne & Karylle (October 22, Monday)	Anne Curtis and Karylle performed an elemental circus act with insects, fire, aerials, and swimming.	Grand Champion (tie) Average Score: 10	Video	
Team Jugs & Teddy (October 23, Tuesday)	Jugs Jugueta and Teddy Corpuz led a funny Gangnam Style parody with the studio audience, fellow hosts, Bugoy Cariño, and Cristine Reyes.	Grand Champion (tie) Average Score: 10	Video	
Team Kuya Kim & Ryan (October 24, Wednesnday)	Kim Atienza and Ryan Bang spoofed Anne Curtis's 2011 Magpasikat act with Angeline Quinto singing I Don't Want to Miss a Thing.	Unknown	Video	
Team Coleen, Eruption & Baby Joy (October 24, Wednesnday)	Coleen Garcia and Eric "Eruption" Tai with Joy Rendon danced across cultural styles from New Zealand, India, Africa, and the Philippines. Note: Jon Santos, Andy Smith, and Gab Valenciano also made guest appearances.	Unknown	Video	
Team Vice & Jhong (October 25, Thursday)	Vice Ganda and Jhong Hilario did skits inspired by Soltera with singing and dancing. Note: Kedebon Colim, Negi, and Paulo Avelino participated in the act.	Unknown	Video	
Team Billy & Vhong (October 26, Friday)	Billy Crawford and Vhong Navarro showcased a tech-heavy futuristic dance performance.	Grand Champion (tie) Average Score: 10	Video	

=== Magpasikat 2013 ===
The fourth Magpasikat anniversary special was held during the week of October 21, 2013. Five teams competed: Team Ryan & Eruption; Team Teddy, Karylle & Jugs; Team Billy, Vhong & Coleen; Team Vice & Kuya Kim; and Team Jhong & Anne. Kim Atienza was unable to perform live due to illness but appeared in pre-recorded footage shown before his team’s act. The judging panel consisted of Amy Perez, Ai-Ai de las Alas, Ruffa Gutierrez, Robert Seña, and Isay Alvarez-Seña.

Team Teddy, Karylle & Jugs was declared the grand champion, marking Jugs Jugueta and Teddy Corpuz’s second consecutive and third overall win, and Karylle’s second straight victory. Team Vice & Kuya Kim placed second, while Team Billy, Vhong & Coleen placed third.

List of Magpasikat 2013 performances and results
Group	Performance description	Result	Watch	Ref.
Team Ryan & Eruption (October 21, Monday)	Ryan Bang and Eric "Eruption" Tai staged a UFC-inspired dance battle, ending with upside-down ballet.	Unknown	Video	
Team Teddy, Karylle & Jugs (October 22, Tuesday)	Teddy Corpuz, Karylle, and Jugs Jugueta sang gibberish chaos that revealed It's Showtime theme when reversed.	Grand Champion Average Score: 10	Video	
Team Billy, Vhong & Coleen (October 23, Wednesday)	Billy Crawford, Vhong Navarro, and Coleen Garcia reprised last year's act by Navarro and Crawford with new elements.	3rd Place	Video	
Team Vice & Kuya Kim (October 24, Thursday)	Vice Ganda performed Frozen and Wild with acrobatics; JC de Vera joined with Applause.	2nd Place	Video	
Team Jhong & Anne (October 25, Friday)	Jhong Hilario and Anne Curtis danced a romantic gender-swap routine with cameos from Ellen Adarna and Boy Abunda.	Unknown	Video	

=== Magpasikat 2014 ===
The fifth Magpasikat anniversary special was held during the week of October 20, 2014, featuring five teams: Team Karylle & Kuya Kim; Team Vhong & Jhong; Team Anne & Coleen; Team Vice & Ryan; and Team Teddy, Billy & Jugs. Eric "Eruption" Tai was initially slated to join Team Vice & Ryan but was unable to participate. Unlike previous editions with five judges, the 2014 panel included only three: Pops Fernandez, Jim Paredes, and Cherie Gil.

Team Anne & Coleen finished third, Team Vhong & Jhong placed second, and Team Teddy, Billy & Jugs was named grand champion. The win marked Jugs Jugueta and Teddy Corpuz's third consecutive victoryand fourth overall, while it was Billy Crawford's second.

List of Magpasikat 2014 performances and results
Group	Performance description	Result	Watch	Ref.
Team Karylle & Kuya Kim (October 20, Monday)	Karylle and Kim Atienza mixed music with eco-friendly DIY science, ending with Dionisia Pacquiao promoting an app.	Unknown	Video	
Team Vhong & Jhong (October 21, Tuesday)	Vhong Navarro and Jhong Hilario danced to I'll Be There, revealing powder-blasted portraits after a friendship-themed montage.	2nd Place	Video	
Team Anne & Coleen (October 22, Wednesday)	Anne Curtis and Coleen Garcia played various instruments, beatboxed, and ended with aerial acrobatics.	3rd Place	Video	
Team Vice & Ryan (October 23, Thursday)	Vice Ganda and Ryan Bang sang an original equality anthem with orchestral backing, produced in collaboration with Gerard Salonga and the ABS-CBN Philharmonic Orchestra.	Unknown	Video	
Team Teddy, Billy & Jugs (October 24, Friday)	Teddy Corpuz, Billy Crawford, and Jugs Jugueta spoofed a noontime show, gave away ₱90,000. Note: The performance also included appearances by Nadine Lustre and James Reid.	Grand Champion	Video	

=== Magpasikat 2015 ===
The sixth edition of Magpasikat, subtitled Happy ANIMversary!, was held during the week of October 19, 2015. Six teams competed: Team Karylle & Jhong; Team Vhong & Ryan; Team Vice; Jugs & Teddy; Team Anne, Kuya Kim & Eruption; and Team Billy & Coleen. The judging panel consisted of three celebrity pairs: Sakto hosts Amy Perez and Marc Logan; 1970s matinée idols Tirso Cruz III and Edgar Mortiz; and Forevermore love team Nonong de Andres and Lilia Cuntapay.

Team Anne, Kim Atienza & Eruption placed third; Team Karylle & Jhong placed second; and Team Vice, Jugs & Teddy was declared the grand champion. This marked Jugs Jugueta and Teddy Corpuz’s fourth consecutive win—the longest winning streak in Magpasikat history—and their fifth overall. It was also Vice Ganda’s first win.

List of Magpasikat 2015 performances and results
Group	Performance description	Result	Watch	Ref.
Team Karylle & Jhong (October 19, Monday)	Karylle and Jhong Hilario did a musical about estranged siblings—one a singer, the other a criminal. Note: Yael Yuzon participated as a member of the live band during the performance.	2nd Place	Part 1 Part 2	
Team Vhong & Ryan (October 20, Tuesday)	Vhong Navarro and Ryan Bang delivered a comedic dance with surprise celeb cameos. Note: The act featured guest appearances by John Lloyd Cruz, Angelica Panganiban, and Nhikzy Calma.	Unknown	Video	
Team Vice, Jugs & Teddy (October 21, Wednesday)	Vice Ganda, Jugs Jugueta, and Teddy Corpuz used optical illusions in a performance of Kapit Lang with star-studded pre-show clips. Note: The pre-recorded video played prior to the live performance included appearances by Wenn V. Deramas, James Reid, Nadine Lustre, and Coco Martin.	Grand Champion	Video	
Team Anne, Kuya Kim & Eruption (October 22, Thursday)	Anne Curtis, Kim Atienza, and Eric "Eruption" Tai staged an eco-themed ninja battle; Atienza shaved his head for climate awareness.	3rd Place	Video	
Team Billy & Coleen (October 23, Friday)	Billy Crawford and Coleen Garcia danced their love story with trampolines, art, and poetry.	Unknown	Video	

=== Magpasikat 2016 ===
The seventh edition of Magpasikat, subtitled HaPITOgether, was held from October 17 to 21, 2016. Five teams competed: Team Billy & Ryan (Pink), Team Vhong & Jhong (Green), Team Karylle, Jugs, Teddy & Mariel (Red), Team Anne, Amy & Joey (Blue), and Team Vice & Kuya Kim (Yellow). This edition marked the Magpasikat debuts of Mariel Rodriguez-Padilla, Amy Perez, and Joey Marquez. Rodriguez-Padilla appeared only via pre-recorded video due to pregnancy. For the first time, members of the show's dance groups, Hashtags and GirlTrends, were included in each team's performance. The panel of judges included Mel Villena, Precious Lara Quigaman, film director Nick Olanka, Jolina Magdangal, and Sonny Angara.

Team Anne, Amy & Joey won the grand prize, followed by Team Vhong & Jhong (second) and Team Karylle, Jugs, Teddy & Mariel (third). The win was Anne Curtis's third, and the first for Amy Perez and Joey Marquez.

List of Magpasikat 2016 performances and results
Group	Performance description	Result	Watch	Ref.
Team Billy & Ryan (October 17, Monday)	Billy Crawford and Ryan Bang did a comedic skit with Piolo Pascual, featuring a mock horror game show titled Yak Ganern and dance finale. Note: They were joined by Hashtags members McCoy de Leon and Jimboy Martin, and GirlTrends members Barbie Imperial, Erin Ocampo, Kamille Filoteo, and Joana Hipolito.	5th Place Average Score: 8.6	Video	
Team Vhong & Jhong (October 18, Tuesday)	Vhong Navarro and Jhong Hilario honored janitors through a martial arts and VFX-heavy performance, introduced by Eddie Garcia. Note: They were accompanied by Hashtags members Nikko Natividad, Jon Lucas, and Luke Conde, and GirlTrends members Jessica Marasigan, Leyana Magat, and Riva Quenery, along with real-life janitors.	2nd Place Average Score: 9.8	Video	
Team Jugs, Teddy, Karylle & Mariel (October 19, Wednesday)	Jugs Jugueta, Teddy Corpuz, and Karylle staged a vibrant set inspired by Filipino EDM festivals. The act was introduced in segments by Mariel Rodriguez-Padilla Note: Hashtags members Ronnie Alonte and Jameson Blake, along with GirlTrends members Mikee Agustin, Sammie Rimando, Devon Seron, and Kelley Day participated in the act.	3rd Place Average Score: 9.2	Video	
Team Anne, Amy & Joey (October 20, Thursday)	Amy Perez and Joey Marquez opened with hallway dancing and ended with anti-gravity stunts; Anne Curtis performed suspended outside the ELJ Communications Center Tower. Note: Hashtags members Paulo Angeles, Ryle Santiago, Ronnie Alonte, and Jameson Blake, along with GirlTrends members Miho Nishida, Maika Rivera, Dawn Chang, and Krissha Viaje participated in the act.	Grand Champion Average Score: 10	Video	
Team Vice & Kuya Kim (October 21, Friday)	Vice Ganda and Kim Atienza told a story of a gay boy’s journey to acceptance, set to Fix You, with Ganda portraying the grown-up version. Note: The team also included Hashtags members Tom Doromal and Zeus Collins, and GirlTrends members Nikki Gonzales, Jane de Leon, Mica Javier, and Chienna Filomeno.	4th Place Average Score: 9.0	Video	

=== Magpasikat 2017 ===
The eighth edition of Magpasikat, subtitled Let's Celebr8!, was held during the week of October 16, 2017. Five teams competed, each represented by a color: Team Billy, Amy, and James (Green), Team Vice, Jugs, and Teddy (Pink), Team Anne, Ryan, and Nadine (Yellow), Team Vhong (Blue), and Team Karylle and Jhong (Red). The edition marked the Magpasikat debuts of James Reid and Nadine Lustre, and continued the inclusion of It's Showtime dance groups Hashtags and GirlTrends. Joey Marquez and Mariel Rodriguez-Padilla were initially slated to co-lead Team Vhong but withdrew due to health and maternal reasons, respectively. The judges were Maricel Soriano, Ina Raymundo, Marc Logan, Janno Gibbs, and Rory Quintos.

Team Vhong was named grand champion, followed by Team Vice, Jugs, and Teddy in second place, and Team Karylle and Jhong in third. This marked Vhong Navarro’s second Magpasikat win.

List of Magpasikat 2017 performances and results
Group	Performance description	Result	Watch	Ref.
Team Billy, Amy & James (October 16, Monday)	Billy Crawford, Amy Perez, and James Reid performed a Renaissance-style magic act with quick-change illusions, escape tricks, and teleportation tricks. Note: They were joined by Hashtags members Zeus Collins, Paulo Angeles, and Rayt Carreon, as well as GirlTrends members Kamille Filoteo, Maika Rivera, Sammie Rimando, and Jessica Marasigan.	5th Place Average Score: 7.2	Video	
Team Vice, Jugs & Teddy (October 17, Tuesday)	Vice Ganda and Jugs Jugueta did a love-themed number ending in a surprise wedding for Teddy Corpuz on live TV. Note: The performance featured Hashtags members Ronnie Alonte, Ryle Santiago, Charles Kieron, and Luke Conde, and GirlTrends members Mica Javier and Krissha Viaje..	2nd Place Average Score: 9.8	Video	
Team Anne, Ryan & Nadine (October 18, Wednesday)	Anne Curtis, Ryan Bang, and Nadine Lustre led a one-shot "Love Parade" with an original song titled Join the Love Parade. Note: Hashtags members Jameson Blake, Vitto Marquez, and Franco Hernandez, along with GirlTrends members Kelley Day and Chienna Filomeno, also participated.	4th Place Average Score: 9.0	Video	
Team Vhong (October 19, Thursday)	Vhong Navarro gave a dance tribute to loneliness using mirrors with Hashtags members Nikko Natividad, Tom Doromal, Bugoy Cariño, and Kid Yambao, as well as GirlTrends members Erin Ocampo and Joana Hipolito, all dressed to resemble Navarro.	Grand Champion Average Score: 10.0	Video	
Team Karylle & Jhong (October 20, Friday)	Karylle and Jhong Hilario staged a live musical about a love story between a vain caterpillar and a humble cockroach. Note: Hashtags members McCoy de Leon, Wilbert Ross, and Maru Delgado, along with GirlTrends members Dawn Chang and Mikee Agustin, played supporting roles.	3rd Place Average Score: 9.2	Part 1 Part 2	

=== Magpasikat 2018 ===
The ninth edition of Magpasikat, subtitled "and 9... Thank You!", was held during the week of October 15, 2018. Five teams competed: Team Jugs & Teddy, Team Vice & Amy, Team Anne & Mariel, Team Vhong & Ryan, and Team Karylle & Jhong. For the third consecutive year, members of the show's dance groups, Hashtags and GirlTrends, were included in each team. The judging panel featured Gus Abelgas, Empoy Marquez, Shalani Soledad-Romulo, Rey "PJ" Abellana, Ronnie Ricketts, and singer Mariz Ricketts.

Team Karylle & Jhong was named the grand champion, marking Karylle's third win and Jhong Hilario's first. Team Vice & Amy placed second, while Team Anne & Mariel finished third.

List of Magpasikat 2018 performances and results
Group	Performance description	Result	Watch	Ref.
Team Jugs & Teddy (October 15, Monday)	Jugs Jugueta and Teddy Corpuz performed a comedic skit about a devoted father, parodying TV genres like dramas, game shows, and FPJ's Ang Probinsyano. Note: They were joined by Hashtags members Zeus Collins, Vitto Marquez, and Maru Delgado, and GirlTrends members Joana Hipolito and Mica Javier.	5th Place Average Score: 7.6	Video	
Team Vice & Tyang Amy (October 16, Tuesday)	Vice Ganda and Amy Perez showcased a dream-chasing musical with trampolines, rain effects, and energetic dance numbers. Note: Hashtags members McCoy de Leon, Luke Conde, and Wilbert Ross, and GirlTrends members Krissha Viaje and Mikee Agustin participated in the act.	2nd Place Average Score: 9.2	Video	
Team Anne & Mariel (October 17, Wednesday)	Anne Curtis and Mariel Rodriguez-Padilla delivered an aerial circus act inspired by The Greatest Showman, blending stunts and acrobatics. Note: Hashtags members Jameson Blake, Ryle Santiago, Tom Doromal, and Kid Yambao, and GirlTrends members Sammie Rimando and Kamille Filoteo participated in the act.	3rd Place Average Score: 9.0	Video	
Team Vhong & Ryan (October 18, Thursday)	Vhong Navarro and Ryan Bang staged an anti-bullying performance with LED lights and synchronized choreography. Note: Hashtags members Nikko Natividad, Charles Kieron, and Paulo Angeles, and GirlTrends members Dawn Chang and Maika Rivera participated in the act.	4th Place Average Score: 8.8	Video	
Team Karylle & Jhong (October 19, Friday)	Karylle and Jhong Hilario returned with a sequel to their 2017 musical about a caterpillar and cockroach, tackling love, identity, and acceptance. Note: Supporting them were Hashtags members Ronnie Alonte, Jimboy Martin, and Rayt Carreon, and GirlTrends members Chienna Filomeno and Jessica Marasigan.	Grand Champion Average Score: 9.4	Video	

=== Magpasikat 2019 ===
The tenth edition of Magpasikat, subtitled Sampu-Sample, was held from October 22, 2019, at the Newport Performing Arts Theater in Pasay. Five teams competed: Team Anne & Amy with BidaMan finalists; Team Karylle & Ryan with Tawag ng Tanghalan singers; Team Jhong, Jugs & Teddy with Jackie, Ion, and Sanrio; Team Vhong & Mariel with the Hashtags; and Team Vice with Miss Q and A queens. The edition featured the largest judging panel to date, composed of ten members, including Maria Rachel Arenas, Tina Monzon-Palma, Andy Alviz, Tim Yap, Joel Cruz, Vicki Belo, Diether Ocampo, Rene Napeñas (Head of the NCCA Public Affairs and Information Office), Shirley Halili-Cruz (Chairperson of the National Committee on Dance), and Edu Manzano as head judge.

Team Vice was named grand champion, winning ₱1 million and a vacation package for charity. This marked Vice Ganda’s second Magpasikat victory. Team Vhong & Mariel placed second (₱700,000), followed by Team Anne & Amy in third (₱600,000). The remaining teams received ₱500,000 each.

List of Magpasikat 2019 performances and results
Group	Performance description	Result	Watch	Ref.
Team Anne & Tyang Amy with BidaMan Top 6 (October 22, Tuesday)	Anne Curtis and Amy Perez paid tribute to Showtime's journey with aerial acts, dance, wheel gymnastics, and a finale of Forever Young inside a spinning sphere.	3rd Place Average Score: 9.0	Video	
Team Karylle & Ryan with Tawag ng Tanghalan singers (October 23, Wednesday)	Karylle and Ryan Bang explored their love-hate bond with musical storytelling, K-pop parodies, heartfelt speeches, and the original song Pabuhat. Note: The Tawag ng Tanghalan singers involved in the performance included John Mark Saga, Janine Berdin, Elaine Duran, and TNT Boys.	4th Place Average Score: 8.8	Video	
Team Jhong, Jugs & Teddy with Jackie, Ion, and Sanrio (October 24, Thursday)	Jhong Hilario, Jugs Jugueta, and Teddy Corpuz a comedic '80s tribute with reversed audio, impersonations of Michael Jackson, Boy George, Randy Santiago, and Madonna, Indiana Jones, Hulk Hogan, Gabby Concepcion, and Sharon Cuneta, and surprise cameos from Kim Atienza, Eric “Eruption” Tai, Billy Crawford, and Coleen Garcia.	5th Place Average Score: 8.0	Video	
Team Vhong & Mariel with Hashtags (October 25, Friday)	Vhong Navarro and Mariel Rodriguez-Padilla presented a futuristic tale of joy-spreading mandroids, ending with a message from an elderly Navarro and a symbolic group hug.	2nd Place Average Score: 9.4	Video	
Team Vice with Miss Q and A Queens (October 26, Saturday)	Vice Ganda delivered a raw, musical performance about alopecia and self-love, featuring iconic songs, wigs, and appearances by Dawn Zulueta and real-life alopecia patients.	Grand Champion Average Score: 9.7	Video	

=== Magpasikat 2020 ===
The eleventh edition of Magpasikat, subtitled Eleven Up ang Samahan, was held on October 31, 2020. Four teams competed: Team Jhong, Karylle, & Ion; Team Jugs, Teddy, & Ryan; Team Vhong, Amy, & Jackie; and Team Vice and Kim. The edition marked the Magpasikat debuts of Kim Chiu as well as Ion Perez and Jackie Gonzaga as team leaders. Due to restrictions caused by the COVID-19 pandemic, the competition was held without a panel of judges.

For the first time, all four teams were declared co-grand champions—marking the second time in Magpasikat history with multiple winners, the first being in 2012. These wins marked the sixth for Jugs Jugueta and Teddy Corpuz, fourth for Karylle, second for Jhong Hilario, third for Vhong Navarro, third for Vice Ganda, second for Amy Perez, and the firsts for Ryan Bang, Kim Chiu, Ion Perez, and Jackie Gonzaga.

List of Magpasikat 2020 performances and results
Group	Performance description	Result	Watch	Ref.
Team Karylle, Jhong & Ion	Karylle, Jhong Hilario, and Ion Perez portrayed street workers during the pandemic—jeepney driver, balut vendor, and ice cream seller—through skits and songs. It ended with the original song Aahon and a cameo by Zsa Zsa Padilla.	Grand Champion (tie)	Video	
Team Jugs, Teddy & Ryan	Jugs Jugueta, Teddy Corpuz, and Ryan Bang staged Project 11: Tuloy Ang Tugtugan, a musical tribute to struggling bands during the pandemic. They performed rock hits and ended with an original number featuring Anne Curtis and various Filipino artists. Note: The Filipino artists included Apl.de.ap, Andrea Manzano, I Belong to the Zoo, Zel Bautista, Jeff Bolivar (Soapdish), Kitchie Nadal, Ebe Dancel, and Raymund Marasigan.	Grand Champion (tie)	Video	
Team Vhong, Amy & Jackie	Vhong Navarro, Amy Perez, and Jackie Gonzaga honored real-life teachers. They dramatized stories of educators balancing work and personal struggles, ending with a dance and tribute video.	Grand Champion (tie)	Video	
Team Vice & Kim	Vice Ganda and Kim Chiu tackled grief and healing through haunting songs and interpretive dances. The performance ended with them emerging in white, singing Million Reasons.	Grand Champion (tie)	Video	

=== Magpasikat 2021 ===
The twelfth edition of Magpasikat, subtitled Labindala-Woah! 12 Taong Saya at Pagsasama, was held on November 27, 2021. Four teams competed: Team Karylle, Amy & Kim; Team Vhong & Ogie; Team Jugs, Teddy & Ion; and Team Vice, Ryan & Jacki. This edition marked Ogie Alcasid's Magpasikat debut. Karylle participated via a pre-recorded performance. The panel of judges included Gary Valenciano, Catriona Gray, Joel Torre, and Raymund Marasigan.

Team Karylle, Amy, and Kim won the competition and received ₱200,000 for the Girl's Got Game foundation. Team Vice, Ryan, and Jackie placed second and received ₱100,000 for the Ruth Foundation Project Reef Care. The remaining teams tied for third and received ₱100,000 for their chosen chairites. The victory marked second consecutive wins for Karylle, Amy Perez, and Kim Chiu; a third overall for Perez; and a fifth for Karylle.

List of Magpasikat 2021 performances and results
Group	Performance description	Result	Watch	Ref.
Team Karylle, Amy & Kim	Karylle, Amy Perez, and Kim Chiu honored Filipina athletes with a performance featuring dance, music, and Karylle’s original song Kababaihan. 4th Impact performed, and Chiu closed with a drum solo.	Grand Champion Average Score: 9.42	Video	
Team Vhong & Ogie	Vhong Navarro and Ogie Alcasid presented SKID Games, a parody of Filipino street games. They competed in piko, tagu-taguan, and patintero, with musical numbers and a twist reveal of Jhong Hilario as gamemaster. Note: Special guests included Gary Valenciano, Moira Dela Torre, Regine Velasquez-Alcasid, El Gamma Penumbra, Ebe Dancel, Lara Maigue, Jeremy Glinoga, Reiven Umali, and Sam Mangubat.	3rd Place (tie)	Video	
Team Jugs, Teddy & Ion	Jugs Jugueta, Teddy Corpuz, and Ion Perez led a comedy-action skit guided by audience votes. Searching for stolen birds, they faced funny challenges and ended with Don't Touch My Birdie.	3rd Place (tie)	Video	
Team Vice, Ryan & Jackie	Vice Ganda, Ryan Bang, and Jackie Gonzaga mixed humor and grief. They danced to Take On Me, performed comedy, and reflected on loss through songs like To Where You Are and See You Again. Note: Ivana Alawi and Darren Espanto appeared.	2nd Place	Video	

=== Magpasikat 2022 ===
The thirteenth edition of Magpasikat, subtitled TRESElebrate, was held from November 14 to 19, 2022. It marked the return of the traditional week-long format after two years of single-day events due to COVID-19 restrictions. Five teams were selected by the show's management: Team Anne, Jackie & Ion; Team Jhong & Ryan; Team Jugs, Teddy & Kim; Team Vice & Amy; and Team Karylle & Ogie. The panel of judges included ABS-CBN Foundation executive Ernie Lopez, John Arcilla, Baron Geisler, Janice de Belen, showbiz personality Pia Magalona, and Darren Espanto.

Team Jhong & Ryan was declared the grand champion, marking Jhong Hilario’s third win and Ryan Bang’s second, and received ₱500,000 for their chosen charity, the veterans of the Korean War. Team Vice & Amy placed second (₱300,000), while Team Karylle & Ogie came in third (₱100,000).

List of Magpasikat 2022 performances and results
Group	Performance description	Result	Watch	Ref.
Team Anne, Jackie & Ion (November 14, Monday)	Anne Curtis, Jackie Gonzaga, and Ion Perez did a fantasy tribute to motherhood. Curtis journeyed across planets with stunts and stars to find her daughter. Gonzaga and Perez performed aerial routines. Note: Narration by Charo Santos-Concio.	4th Place Average Score: 8.65	Video	
Team Jhong & Ryan (November 15, Tuesday)	Jhong Hilario and Ryan Bang showcased Filipino-Korean culture through dances, games, and music. Ended with Sarap ng Buhay and traditional dances. Note: Bayang Barrios at ang Naliyagan, TFN, child stars Mela and Stella Francisco, KD Estrada, Alexa Ilacad, Kaori Oinuma, and Chunsa Jung performed, and Sandara Park, Thunder, Nancy McDonie, TAN, and Lapillus sent greetings.	Grand Champion Average Score: 9.35	Video	
Team Jugs, Teddy & Kim (November 16, Wednesday)	Jugs Jugueta, Teddy Corpuz, and Kim Chiu delivered RockPasikat, mixing dance, aerial acts, and OPM hits with water effects. Note: Featured Janine Teñoso, Nik Makino, Lougee Basabas, Hannah Romawac, Acel Bisa, Aia De Leon, and other various rock icons.	5th Place Average Score: 8.63	Video	
Team Vice & Amy (November 17, Thursday)	Vice Ganda and Amy Perez honored workers with themed dances—tailoring, salons, and construction—ending in a sign language tribute with KZ Tandingan, Enchong Dee, and disabled performers.	2nd Place Average Score: 9.23	Video	
Team Karylle & Ogie (November 18, Friday)	Karylle and Ogie Alcasid staged Dito Sa Puso Ko, a jukebox musical on love and reunion. Zsa Zsa Padilla played Ogie’s long-lost love. Note: Guest performers included Regine Velasquez, Jolina Magdangal, Melai Cantiveros, and Bituin Escalante.	3rd Place Average Score: 9.18	Video	

=== Magpasikat 2023 ===
The fourteenth edition of Magpasikat, subtitled 1-4 Ever, was held from November 6 to 11, 2023, after being rescheduled from its original October date. Five teams competed: Team Vhong, Jugs, and Teddy; Team Karylle, Amy, MC, and Lassy; Team Anne, Ogie, and Ryan; Team Vice, Jackie, and Cianne; and Team Jhong, Kim, and Ion. The edition marked the Magpasikat debut of Cianne Dominguez and the first time comedians MC Calaquian and Lassy Marquez served as team leaders. Vhong Navarro also returned to the competition following a hiatus. The judging panel included apl.de.ap, Barbie Forteza, Jett Pangan, Olivia Lamasan, and Tirso Cruz III.

Team Jhong, Kim, and Ion was declared the grand champion and received ₱300,000 for their chosen charity. The victory marked Jhong Hilario’s second consecutive and fourth overall win, Kim Chiu’s third, and Ion Perez’s second. Team Anne, Ogie, and Ryan placed second (₱200,000), while Team Vhong, Jugs, and Teddy placed third (₱100,000). Teams Vice, Jackie, and Cianne, and Karylle, Amy, MC, and Lassy placed fourth and fifth, respectively, and received ₱50,000 each.

List of Magpasikat 2023 performances and results
Group	Performance description	Result	Watch	Ref.
Team Vhong, Jugs & Teddy (November 6, Monday)	Vhong Navarro, Jugs Jugueta, and Teddy Corpuz used deepfake technology to honor late Filipino comedians like Dolphy, Babalu, and Redford White. Nova Villa, who starred in Home Along Da Riles along with Dolphy and Babalu, made an appearance.	3rd Place Average Score: 8.2	Video	
Team Karylle, Amy, MC & Lassy (November 7, Tuesday)	Karylle, Amy Perez, MC Calaquian, and Lassy Marquez told a musical tale of a boy imagining his siblings’ jobs as magical adventures. It ended with a family reunion and reprise of All I Need is My Family. Note: Stars like Iza Calzado, Sunshine Dizon, BGYO, Taylor Sheesh, and BINI appeared.	5th Place Average Score: 6.2	Video	
Team Anne, Ogie & Ryan (November 8, Wednesday)	Anne Curtis, Ogie Alcasid, and Ryan Bang centered their act on healing. Bang danced on a spinning stage to Stand by Me, Ogie flew mid-air to Huwag Kang Matakot, and Curtis performed aerial spirals to Fix You, joined by sister Jasmine Curtis-Smith.	2nd Place Average Score: 8.6	Video	
Team Vice, Jackie & Cianne (November 9, Thursday)	Vice Ganda, Jackie Gonzaga, and Cianne Dominguez portrayed childhood dreams through dance and aerial stunts. They met their younger selves and moms, closing with A Million Dreams and a surprise from Billy Crawford and Coleen Garcia with their son.	4th Place Average Score: 7.4	Video	
Team Jhong, Kim & Ion (November 10, Friday)	Jhong Hilario, Kim Chiu, and Ion Perez addressed phone addiction through dance and drama. They showed its toll on family, mental health, and society, ending with a parkour act and a call for mindful phone use.	Grand Champion Average Score: 9.6	Video	

=== Magpasikat 2024 ===
The 15th edition of Magpasikat, subtitled KinsEYYY, ran from October 21–26, 2024, with five competing teams: Team Vice, Karylle & Ryan; Team Ogie, Kim, MC & Lassy; Team Vhong, Ion, Darren & Amy; Team Anne, Jugs & Teddy; and Team Jhong, Jackie & Cianne. This edition marked the official Magpasikat debut of Darren Espanto, who had joined It's Showtime as a regular host in March 2024. It was also the first edition to air on both ALLTV and GMA. The panel of judges included Rory Quintos, Alice Dixson, Donny Pangilinan, Gabbi Garcia, and Freddie M. Garcia.

Team Ogie, Kim, MC & Lassy won the ₱300,000 grand prize for charity, marking Kim Chiu’s second consecutive and fourth overall win and the first victories for Ogie Alcasid, MC Calaquian, and Lassy Marquez. Team Jhong, Jackie & Cianne placed second and received ₱200,000. Team Anne, Jugs & Teddy took third and ₱100,000. Team Vice, Karylle & Ryan and Team Vhong, Ion, Darren & Amy finished fourth and fifth, respectively, with a ₱50,000 consolation prize.

List of Magpasikat 2024 performances and results
Group	Performance description	Result	Watch	Ref.
Team Vice, Karylle & Ryan (October 21, Monday)	Vice Ganda, Karylle, and Ryan Bang presented a performance centered on hope and resilience. Karylle paid tribute to her late father, Bang reflected on family struggles from his youth in Korea, and Ganda addressed public criticism faced by the show's hosts. Note: The segment featured appearances by SB19, Carlos Yulo, Awra Briguela, an expectant couple, and an OFW mother reuniting with her family after six years.	4th Place Average Score: 7.6	Video	
Team Ogie, Kim, MC & Lassy (October 22, Tuesday)	Ogie Alcasid, Kim Chiu, MC Calaquian, and Lassy Marquez presented a performance on resilience and life in the public eye. The act featured Alcasid playing piano on a rotating wheel, Marquez and Calaquian in aerial stunts, and Chiu on a trapeze. It concluded with a tribute to the production crew and a message of hope and perseverance.	Grand Champion Average Score: 9.2	Video	
Team Vhong, Ion, Darren & Amy (October 23, Wednesday)	Vhong Navarro, Ion Perez, Darren Espanto, and Amy Perez delivered a family-themed performance depicting a mother raising two children, culminating in a tragic twist. Note: Navarro portrayed a Grim Reaper figure.	5th Place Average Score: 7.3	Video	
Team Anne, Jugs & Teddy (October 24, Thursday)	Anne Curtis, Jugs Jugueta, and Teddy Corpuz performed on October 24, 2024, coinciding with It’s Showtime’s 15th anniversary. Inspired by Inside Out, their act highlighted the show’s milestones and challenges, including the ABS-CBN franchise denial and MTRCB suspensions. The performance ended on a hopeful note with Huwag Muna Tayong Umuwi, serving as a reflective tribute to the program’s legacy. Note: The segment featured appearance by BINI performing Huwag Muna Tayong Umuwi and I Feel Good.	3rd Place Average Score: 8.3	Video	
Team Jhong, Jackie & Cianne (October 25, Friday)	Jhong Hilario, Jackie Gonzaga, and Cianne Dominguez delivered a mental health-themed performance featuring expressive dance and a pendulum swing segment, highlighting the importance of seeking help. Kylie Verzosa and Michelle Dee joined the symbolic gesture of wearing green scarves, later echoed by the hosts.	2nd Place Average Score: 8.9	Video	

== Entertainment segments ==
=== Magpasikat 2025: MagPASKOsikat ===
The 16th edition of Magpasikat, subtitled 1t’s 6iving and titled MagPASKOsikat, aired from December 1 to 6, 2025. This year’s anniversary celebration departed from the traditional annual group performances, instead featuring special numbers from the hosts, a special edition of Laro Laro Pick (see below), and culminated with an awards show. It is also the second edition to air on both ALLTV and GMA.

This is the third Magpasikat to skip its traditional October schedule for the first time since its introduction in 2010. On October 24, 2025 – the exact anniversary date of It's Showtime – host Vice Ganda announced during the live broadcast that the traditional Magpasikat performances would not be held that year. According to Vice Ganda, the decision stemmed from the increasing production costs, with each team performance reportedly requiring ₱6 million to ₱10 million to produce. The host explained that the show "couldn’t afford it anymore" while maintaining the high creative standards set in previous years. Instead of the annual competition held in the previous years, It’s Showtime announced that its 16th anniversary celebration would focus on entertainment combined with public service and outreach to viewers. The decision was framed as a move toward a "more meaningful" form of celebration rather than a grand competition.

List of Magpasikat 2025 performances
Day and theme	Performance description	Ref.
Day 1: Mag-RAP-asikat (December 1, Monday)	The 16th anniversary celebration kick-off featured a series of lively performances: Jhong Hilario with Elmo and Arkin Magalona opened with “Mga Kababayan”; Vhong Navarro performed “Andrew Ford Medina” with Cianne Dominguez and Jackie Gonzaga; Jugs Jugueta, Ogie Alcasid, Ryan Bang, Ion Perez, and DJ M.O.D joined the hip-hop showcase; Paul N’ Ballin and Teddy Corpuz delivered “‘Wag Ipagsabi,” with dances from Darren Espanto and Kim Chiu; Karylle and Aikee performed “Kahit Bata Pa Ako”; Anne Curtis sang with Dice & K9; and Vice Ganda performed with Marko Rudio.	
Day 2: Mag-POP-sikat (December 2, Tuesday)	Day 2 showcased P-pop performances from both hosts and top groups. Darren Espanto opened with SB19’s “Dungka,” followed by Vxon with “The Beast.” DNA performed “Don’t Ask Me Why,” Kaia delivered sweet visuals, and 1621 impressed with their smooth “Bababa.” Wrive energized the crowd with “Ooh La La,” G22 captivated with their stage presence, and BGYO thrilled the audience. The episode closed with the debut of the “It’s Showtime” girl group SWT16—Kim Chiu, Jackie Gonzaga, Cianne Dominguez, and Anne Curtis—performing a red-hot “Pantropiko.” Note: Gwen Apuli of Bini was in the audience.	
Day 3: DANCE-pasikat (December 3, Wednesday)	Day 3 featured high-energy dance collaborations between the hosts and iconic groups. Jhong Hilario opened with the Kalinga Pattong, followed by MC Muah and Lassy with a fierce “Amakabogera.” Ion Perez and the A-Teak crew delivered a surprise hype performance, while Kim Chiu showcased her signature dance-floor power. The Sexbomb Girls, led by Rochelle Pangilinan, ignited the stage with a showdown against Jackie Gonzaga. Vhong Navarro impressed with a synchronized illusion-style routine, and the finale brought nostalgic excitement with The Streetboys’ performance alongside Vhong and Jhong.	
Day 4: ROCK-pasikat (December 4, Thursday)	Day 4 delivered a rock-filled celebration featuring top OPM rock artists. Rocksteddy with Teddy Corpuz opened with “Superhero,” followed by Jugs Jugueta and The Itchyworms with “Akin Ka Na Lang.” Karylle and Aia De Leon led a girl-power rock set, while Carl Guevarra and Janine Berdin performed “Ano Ba Talaga Tayo?” Noel Palomo of Siakol brought classic hits “Tropa” and “Lakas Tama.” Anne Curtis returned with a rakista-themed number, and the highlight was Bamboo, who energized the studio with “Santa Claus Is Coming to Town.”	
Day 5: DRAG-pasikat (December 5, Friday)	Day 5 showcased a vibrant drag-themed celebration, led by Vice Ganda and joined by drag superstars Eva Le Queen, Turing, Shewarma, Popstar Bench, Khianna, Angel Galang, Arizona Brandy, Hana Beshie, Matilduh, Minty Fresh, Precious Paula Nicole, and Viñas DeLuxe. It's Showtime’s male hosts also transformed into drag queens, delivering full-glam performances.	

==== It's Showtime AWAAARD! ====
It’s Showtime AWAARD! parodies traditional award shows by presenting and honoring the most iconic and humorous moments created by the hosts over the years. It aired over two days—on the final day of MagPASKOsikat (December 6), and on December 8, 2025. The segment was hosted by Ryan Bang, Jackie Gonzaga, Barbie Forteza, and Karylle.

- Special Performance: Klarisse de Guzman with Tawag ng Tanghalan champions JM Yosures, Reiven Umali, JM Dela Cerna and Marielle Montellano, Rea Gen Villareal, and Marko Rudio — "Rise" / "High Hopes" (December 6)

**Ha? Hakdog**; **Most unforgettable verbal slip or pronunciation error.** **Presented by: Angeline Quinto**: **Anne Curtis** – **Expecially for You, Tawag ng Tanghalan**; **Jhong Hilario** – **Sine Mo 'To**; Cianne Dominguez – Tawag ng Tanghalan; Jackie Gonzaga – KaraoKids, Tawag ng Tanghalan; Ogie Alcasid – Breaking Muse and Escort Mo, Show Mo; Vhong Navarro – Isip Bata, Mas Testing	**Sablay Supremacy**; **Well-intentioned acts that resulted in a humorous mistake.** **Presented by: Kyline Alcantara**: **Vhong Navarro** – **Rampanalo [x2]**; Anne Curtis – Tawag ng Tanghalan; Jugs Jugueta – Tawag ng Tanghalan; Ryan Bang; Vhong Navarro, Jackie Gonzaga, and Ogie Alcasid – Palarong Pangmadla: Vest in Spelling; Vice Ganda – Sine Mo 'To, Bata Bata Pick!
**Dress in Peace**; **Most questionable or outrageous outfit worn on the show.** **Presented by: Gus Abelgas**: **Jugs Jugueta** – **Sine Mo 'To 2025**; Jackie Gonzaga; Jhong Hilario – Showtime Sexy Babe 2025; Karylle – And the Breadwinner Is...; MC Muah Calaquian – Bata Bata Pick!; Ogie Alcasid – Showtime Sexy Babe 2025; Teddy Corpuz – Showtime Sexy Babe 2021; Vhong Navarro – Expecially for You	**Natutulog Ba Ang Joke**; **Jokes that failed to land.** **Presented by: Petite and Iyah Mina**: **Kim Chiu** – **Expecially for You, Tawag ng Tanghalan**; **Ryan Bang** – **Tawag ng Tanghalan**; Anne Curtis – Expecially for You; Karylle – PuroKATATAWANAN; Vhong Navarro – Showtime Sexy Babe 2021
**G na Gina Alajar**; **Hosts who are always game for on-air teasing or physical comedy.** **Presented by: Esnyr and Ralph de Leon**: **Jackie Gonzaga** – **Rampanalo, Mini Miss U, Girl on Fire, And the Breadwinner Is...**; **Ogie Alcasid** – **Bata Bata Pick!, Sine Mo 'To**; Amy Perez – Tawag ng Tanghalan; Darren Espanto – Isip Bata, And the Breadwinner Is...; Lassy Marquez – Rampanalo, Miss Q&A: Queen of the Multibeks, Kalokalike: Face 4, Tawag ng Tanghalan; MC Muah Calaquian – Expecially for You	**Glow Up**; **Most remarkable personal and visual transformation on the show.** **Presented by: Negi**: **Vice Ganda**; Jhong Hilario; Teddy Corpuz; Vhong Navarro
**Physical Hosting**; **Most iconic moments involving physical comedy.** **Presented by: Chanda Romero and Iyah Mina**: **Vice Ganda, Vhong Navarro, and Jhong Hilario** – **Tawag ng Tanghalan**; Vice Ganda, Vhong Navarro, Jhong Hilario, and MC Muah Calaquian – Showtime Sexy Babe 2025; Vice Ganda and Lassy Marquez – Showing Bulilit; Vice Ganda, Vhong Navarro, Jhong Hilario, Kim Chiu – Tawag ng Tanghalan; MC Muah Calaquian and Lassy Marquez – Sine Mo 'To 2025; Vice Ganda, Vhong Navarro, Jhong Hilario, MC Muah Calaquian, Lassy Marquez, Ion Perez, and Darren Espanto – Sine Mo 'To 2025	**Words of Wisdom**; **Most memorable quotable line delivered on-air.** **Presented by: Petite and Kyline Alcantara**: **Vhong Navarro**; Kim Chiu – x3; Tawag ng Tanghalan [x2], ReINA ng Tahanan; Vice Ganda – x3; AdVice Ganda, Expecially for You [x2]
**Cry 'Yan Cayabyab**; **Emotionally powerful moments where hosts showed vulnerability.** **Presented by: Angeline Quinto**: **Vice Ganda** – **Mini Miss U 2023**; **Ion Perez** – **Magpasikat 2023**; **Ryan Bang** – **Hurado o Burado: Eviction Day**; Ogie Alcasid – Showtime Sexy Babe 2021; Anne Curtis – Miss Q&A: Queen of the Multibeks; Lassy Marquez; Kim Chiu – Expecially for You	**The Elizabeth Clumsy Fallen Star**; **Hilariously unforgettable moments of clumsiness that delighted audiences.** **Presented by: Brent Manalo**: **Karylle** – **Laro Laro Pick**; **Ogie Alcasid** – **Kalokalike: Face 4**; Anne Curtis – PINASikat; Jhong Hilario – Palarong Pangmadla: Vest in Spelling; Jugs Jugueta – Isip Bata; Ryan Bang – Bata Bata Pick!; Vice Ganda – Showtime Sexy Babe 2021
**Don't Okray for Me Argentina**; **For exceptionally sharp and iconic playful banter towards their co-hosts.** **Presented by: Erik Santos**: **Anne Curtis** – **Isip Bata, Miss Q&A: Kween of the Multibeks, Tawag ng Tanghalan**; Ryan Bang – Tawag ng Tanghalan [x2]; Vice Ganda – Isip Bata, Sine Mo 'To, Sinong Nanay Mo?, Tumpakners, KapareWHO; Vhong Navarro – Expecially for You; Ogie Alcasid – Expecially for You	**Showtime Special Appreciation**; **The exceptional leadership, resilience, and commitment in guiding It’s Showtime through various challenges over the years.** **Presented by: Rose Casala, Trina Bitara, and Racquel Buenvenida**: **Vice Ganda**; **Vhong Navarro**; **Jhong Hilario**
**Forever Fam: Madlang People's Choice**; **The collective bond of the It’s Showtime hosts and recognizes them as the program’s enduring family, as chosen by the Madlang People.** **Presented by: Erik Santos**: **All hosts**

=== Magpasikat 2026 ===
The 17th edition of Magpasikat, subtitled DisiSyete (lit. 'seventeen') and titled Dis is Ur Show: DisiSyete (Note: The title is a play on the show’s slogan, “This Is Your Show,” and the Tagalog word disisiyete (seventeen), which is derived from Spanish.), took place from October 19 to 24, 2026. This marks the return of the traditional October schedule, last used in 2024. This edition marked the Magpasikat debuts of Brent Manalo and Ralph de Leon following their introduction as the show’s newest hosts in June 2026, as well as the third edition to air on both ALLTV and GMA.

The edition features special performances by the hosts, various FUNanghalian games, a celebrity special of Miss Q & A, the second special edition of Laro Laro Pick, featuring a progressive jackpot prize starting at ₱500,000, and culminated with the second edition of It's Showtime AWAAARD!.

This edition marked the final Magpasikat to be held at ABS-CBN Studio 3, as announced by Vice Ganda on the final day of the celebration, October 24. This follows the acquisition of a majority of the ABS-CBN Broadcast Center’s land in February 2025, which includes the studio used by It’s Showtime. The deal is scheduled to take effect in December 2026.

List of Magpasikat 2026 performances
Day and theme	Performance description	Ref.
Day 1: Electronic Dance Revolution (October 19, Monday)	Day 1 featured an electronic dance and futuristic-themed showcase combining dance performances, musical numbers, elaborate costumes, and theatrical stage presentations. The performances began with Jhong and Vhong dancing to Chris Brown’s “Turn Up the Music,” followed by Karylle, Amy, and Jackie performing to “Pinky Up” by Katseye, with Jackie subsequently delivering a solo dance number. Ogie and Darren performed to Pitbull’s “Give Me Everything,” while Jugs and Teddy presented a mini-concert featuring Van Halen’s “Jump.” The Showtime Baby Dolls, alongside Cianne, Ryan, and Ion, danced to Flo Rida’s “Club Can't Handle Me.” Vice Ganda followed with a theatrical performance of David Guetta and Bebe Rexha’s “I'm Good (Blue),” featuring a horse statue and an automated golden dress as visual elements. The presentation concluded with all the hosts performing a mashup of “Shut Up and Dance” and the It’s Showtime theme song. NOTE: The showcase also featured Dan Cabrera and Dance Royalty, Ran Rosario, with Six Part Invention.	
Day 2: Retro Dance Revolution (October 20, Tuesday)	Day 2 showcased a nostalgic celebration of 1990s and 2000s dance culture, featuring a Dance Dance Revolution (DDR)-inspired theme that blended hip-hop, disco, ballroom, and Original Pilipino Music (OPM) novelty songs. The performances opened with Jackie, joined by Eliza Borromeo, Sachzna Laparan, Ericka Pineda, and Jas Dudley-Scales, dancing to “Kikay” by Viva Hot Babes. Arizona Brandy performed “Arizona B,” accompanied by Tiny DeLuxe, Taylor Sheesh, Viñas DeLuxe, and Edsa Xxtra. Ion followed with a performance of “Sana Mama” by Masculados, alongside the Gueco Twins, Gabby and Kiel, and Meong. Ryan then led a performance of “Daleng Dale,” a GAT cover of the original song by MMJ, with the Showtime Online Ü squad, content creators Sophie Prime, Forda, and Fonz, and The Aguinaldos, comprising Lester and Leonida “Mommy Ganda” Aguinaldo. Vhong and Jhong reunited with the Streetboys, joined by Amy and content creator Ian Mark Kamangkang, popularly known as “Pitik Queen,” for “Sayaw ng Puso.” Vhong subsequently performed “Totoy Bibbo” with the Showtime Kids, Alexa Ilacad, Mutya Orquia, Xyriel Manabat, and Miguel Vergara. The showcase concluded with a medley of Vhong’s “Da Vhong” and “Oooh Lala Baby,” performed by Vhong, the Showtime Baby Dolls, and the rest of the performers. NOTE: The showcase also featured Dan Cabrera and Dance Royalty, with Six Part Invention.	
Day 3: Kulay ng Pag-ibig (October 21, Wednesday)	Day 3 presented a heartfelt showcase centered on hugot and modern Original Pilipino Music (OPM), highlighting the experiences of love, longing, heartbreak, acceptance, and self-discovery through songs popular among Generation Z. The performance opened with the It’s Showtime hosts singing “Dilaw” by Maki, accompanied by projected sketches of a couple illustrating different perspectives on romantic relationships. A poetic narration introduced the concept: “In every lyric, there is a story. In every melody, there is a love that cannot be expressed. Feelings that... can only be captured in music.” The showcase continued with Earl Agustin performing “Tibok,” representing the excitement of exchanging glances and smiles; Mariah Deborah singing “Na Para Bang,” portraying the experience of resisting attraction but gradually falling deeper in love; and Wilbert Ross of Hashtags performing “Langga,” depicting the peace and comfort found in a loving relationship. Amiel Sol followed with “Sa Bawat Sandali,” expressing longing for moments spent with a loved one, while Rob Deniel performed “Miss Miss,” illustrating the realization that a relationship has become emotionally painful. Fitterkarma’s “Kalapastangan” explored the bittersweet decision to let someone go for their happiness, even when it means no longer being part of their life. Carl Guevara of The Juans then performed “Istorya,” symbolizing the choice to break free and begin creating a new chapter, followed by Angela Ken’s “Ako Naman Muna,” emphasizing self-love and the importance of choosing oneself. Each musical number was accompanied by a corresponding point-of-view statement and a sketch of a couple, visually connecting the songs through a narrative of evolving romantic experiences. The presentation concluded with a reflective narration about music, emotions, and the colors that give meaning to life, culminating in the word “lilim (lit. 'shadow'),” before the performers reunited for a reprise of “Dilaw.”	
Day 4: Rap Revolution (October 22, Thursday)	Day 4 featured a high-energy showcase celebrating Filipino and international rap music, incorporating hip-hop choreography and iconic dance numbers associated with It’s Showtime. The presentation was divided into three parts: The opening segment featured Vhong, Jhong, and Billy Crawford, beginning with a dance medley of “Take It to the Head” and “True,” incorporating signature dance moves from the program’s history. Vhong and Jhong subsequently performed “Panalo” by Ez Mil, followed by Billy’s “Bounce That”.; The second segment featured Apl.de.ap, Anne, Bamboo, and the Showtime Baby Dolls. Apl.de.ap, Anne, and the Baby Dolls performed “Bebot” by the Black Eyed Peas, before Apl.de.ap and Bamboo joined forces with their song “Why”.; The finale centered on contemporary Filipino rap, beginning with Flow G performing “Driftstar,” followed by Skusta Clee’s “Lagabog.” The showcase concluded with their song “Since Day One”, which began with Skusta Clee before Vice Ganda and Flow G joined the performance.	
Day 5: Biritan sa Tanghalian (October 23, Friday)	Day 5 featured a vocal showcase bringing together homegrown singers from ABS-CBN’s Star Music and GMA Network’s GMA Music. Dubbed “The Clash of the Voices ng Tanghalan" (lit. 'The Clash of the Voices of the Stage'), a portmanteau of the singing competitions The Clash and Tawag ng Tanghalan, of which the singers originally came from (Note: Except for Hannah Precillas who was the singing division winner of the 2014 reality show Bet ng Bayan, which was aired on GMA Network.), the presentation celebrated Filipino vocal talent through a series of head-to-head singing competitions. The performance opened with a comedic introduction featuring Anne Curtis and Jackie Gonzaga attempting a duet ("It's All Coming Back To Me Now"), with Anne singing off-key at intervals and Jackie delivering a deliberately off-key performance. The segment served as a humorous prelude to the introduction of the participating singers from both networks. The artists subsequently opened the main showcase with a powerful ensemble number ("This Is the Moment"). The first part featured seven pairings, each consisting of one singer representing ABS-CBN and another representing GMA Network. The contestants took turns performing challenging vocal pieces that showcased their vocal range, power, control, and emotional interpretation. The "matchups" featured Riel Lomadilla and Carmelle Collado ("All by Myself"); Garrett Bolden and JM Dela Cerna ("Dream On"); Arabelle Dela Cruz and Arvery Love Lagoring ("Listen"); John Rex Baculfo and JM Yosures ("Ever Since the World Began"); Hannah Precillas and Marielle Montellano ("Just as I Am"); Jong Madaliday and Marko Rudio ("I'd Do Anything for Love (But I Won't Do That)"); and Jessica Villarubin and Lyka Estrella ("What About Love"). The presentation concluded with a grand ensemble finale ("This Is the Moment"; reprise) featuring all the participating singers, joined by Anne and Jackie. NOTE: The performance was directed by musical director Chuck Joson.	

==== Miss Q & A: Celebrity Edition ====
A celebrity edition of Miss Q & A, titled Miss Q & A: Celebrity Edition, was announced on October 17, 2026, alongside the second special edition of Laro Laro Pick. The edition features three celebrity divisions: straight male celebrities, female celebrities, and gay celebrities.

Five celebrities dressed in drag and using their respective stage names compete in two rounds: Wit Lang! and Beklamation.

- In Wit Lang, contestants compete in a question-and-answer segment featuring either serious or humorous questions. The three contestants with the highest average scores (out of 10) advance to the final round.
- In Beklamation, the remaining contestants are asked the same question and are each given 30 seconds to deliver a speech demonstrating wit, humor, confidence, and emotional intelligence. The judges then determine the winner based on the eloquence, coherence, delivery, and overall effectiveness of each response.

The highest scorer in the final round is crowned Miss Q & A Celebrity Talak-era 2026 grand winner and receives a crown, sash, flower, and ₱50,000 cash prize. The first runner-up receives a crown, sash, flower, and ₱25,000, while the second runner-up receives the same prizes and ₱10,000.

Special Awards

- Best in Opening ChukChak (Opening Introduction)
  - Male Division: Masaralph de Leon
  - Female Division: N/A
  - Gay Division: N/A

Color key:

Winner Runner-Up Third Place	Advanced to the next round Eliminated

- Italicized name indicates a returning contestant from previous spin-offs

Miss Q & A: Celebrity Edition — Male Division (October 19, 2026)
Day	Contestant	Hometown	Score	Result	Judges	Hosts
Monday (October 19, 2026) #Showtime17ProMaxxing	Male Division				Nicole Cordoves; Robi Domingo; Janice de Belen	Vice Ganda; Vhong Navarro; Jhong Hilario
Monday (October 19, 2026) #Showtime17ProMaxxing	Wit Lang!				Nicole Cordoves; Robi Domingo; Janice de Belen	Vice Ganda; Vhong Navarro; Jhong Hilario
Monday (October 19, 2026) #Showtime17ProMaxxing	**River Jean Phoa (River Joseph)**	**Muntinlupa City**	**9.3**	**Advanced**	Nicole Cordoves; Robi Domingo; Janice de Belen	Vice Ganda; Vhong Navarro; Jhong Hilario
Monday (October 19, 2026) #Showtime17ProMaxxing	Disney Vincess Maristela Araneta Siguion Reyna (Vince Maristela)	Cainta, Rizal Province	8.0	Eliminated	Nicole Cordoves; Robi Domingo; Janice de Belen	Vice Ganda; Vhong Navarro; Jhong Hilario
Monday (October 19, 2026) #Showtime17ProMaxxing	Ralpha Mae Gento (Ralph Miaco)	Biñan City, Laguna	8.0	Eliminated	Nicole Cordoves; Robi Domingo; Janice de Belen	Vice Ganda; Vhong Navarro; Jhong Hilario
Monday (October 19, 2026) #Showtime17ProMaxxing	**Masaralph de Leon (Ralph de Leon)**	**Tanza, Cavite**	**9.0**	**Advanced**	Nicole Cordoves; Robi Domingo; Janice de Belen	Vice Ganda; Vhong Navarro; Jhong Hilario
Monday (October 19, 2026) #Showtime17ProMaxxing	**Saranghae Ronimo (Ryan Bang)**	**South Korea**	**9.7**	**Advanced**	Nicole Cordoves; Robi Domingo; Janice de Belen	Vice Ganda; Vhong Navarro; Jhong Hilario
Monday (October 19, 2026) #Showtime17ProMaxxing	Beklamation				Nicole Cordoves; Robi Domingo; Janice de Belen	Vice Ganda; Vhong Navarro; Jhong Hilario
Monday (October 19, 2026) #Showtime17ProMaxxing	River Jean Phoa		—N/a (Note: Scores not revealed)	Third Place	Nicole Cordoves; Robi Domingo; Janice de Belen	Vice Ganda; Vhong Navarro; Jhong Hilario
Monday (October 19, 2026) #Showtime17ProMaxxing	**Masaralph de Leon**		**—N/a**	**Winner**	Nicole Cordoves; Robi Domingo; Janice de Belen	Vice Ganda; Vhong Navarro; Jhong Hilario
Monday (October 19, 2026) #Showtime17ProMaxxing	Saranghae Ronimo		—N/a	Runner-Up	Nicole Cordoves; Robi Domingo; Janice de Belen	Vice Ganda; Vhong Navarro; Jhong Hilario

Miss Q & A: Celebrity Edition — Female Division (October 21, 2026)
Day	Contestant	Hometown	Score	Result	Judges	Hosts
Wednesday (October 21, 2026) #ShowtimeGenZeventeen	Female Division				Nicole Cordoves; Gladys Reyes; Rajo Laurel	Vice Ganda; Vhong Navarro; Jhong Hilario
Wednesday (October 21, 2026) #ShowtimeGenZeventeen	Wit Lang!				Nicole Cordoves; Gladys Reyes; Rajo Laurel	Vice Ganda; Vhong Navarro; Jhong Hilario
Wednesday (October 21, 2026) #ShowtimeGenZeventeen	**Bathalumang Ethelia (Ethel Booba)**	**Laguna Province**	**—N/a**	**Advanced**	Nicole Cordoves; Gladys Reyes; Rajo Laurel	Vice Ganda; Vhong Navarro; Jhong Hilario
Wednesday (October 21, 2026) #ShowtimeGenZeventeen	Alora Boulevard Cubao (Alora Sasam)	Linamon, Lanao del Norte	**—N/a**	Eliminated	Nicole Cordoves; Gladys Reyes; Rajo Laurel	Vice Ganda; Vhong Navarro; Jhong Hilario
Wednesday (October 21, 2026) #ShowtimeGenZeventeen	**Candiva Lacrofasia (Candy Pangilinan)**	**—N/a**	**—N/a**	**Advanced**	Nicole Cordoves; Gladys Reyes; Rajo Laurel	Vice Ganda; Vhong Navarro; Jhong Hilario
Wednesday (October 21, 2026) #ShowtimeGenZeventeen	Shi Sue Ramirez (Verna Periwinkle)	Las Piñas City	**—N/a**	Eliminated	Nicole Cordoves; Gladys Reyes; Rajo Laurel	Vice Ganda; Vhong Navarro; Jhong Hilario
Wednesday (October 21, 2026) #ShowtimeGenZeventeen	**Pokwangderwomom (Pokwang)**	**Antipolo City, Rizal Province**	**—N/a**	**Advanced**	Nicole Cordoves; Gladys Reyes; Rajo Laurel	Vice Ganda; Vhong Navarro; Jhong Hilario
Wednesday (October 21, 2026) #ShowtimeGenZeventeen	Beklamation				Nicole Cordoves; Gladys Reyes; Rajo Laurel	Vice Ganda; Vhong Navarro; Jhong Hilario
Wednesday (October 21, 2026) #ShowtimeGenZeventeen	Pokwangderwomom		9.0	Runner-Up	Nicole Cordoves; Gladys Reyes; Rajo Laurel	Vice Ganda; Vhong Navarro; Jhong Hilario
Wednesday (October 21, 2026) #ShowtimeGenZeventeen	Candiva Lacrofasia		8.0	Third Place	Nicole Cordoves; Gladys Reyes; Rajo Laurel	Vice Ganda; Vhong Navarro; Jhong Hilario
Wednesday (October 21, 2026) #ShowtimeGenZeventeen	**Bathalumang Ethelia**		**10**	**Winner**	Nicole Cordoves; Gladys Reyes; Rajo Laurel	Vice Ganda; Vhong Navarro; Jhong Hilario

Miss Q & A: Celebrity Edition — Gay Division (October 23, 2026)
Day	Contestant	Hometown	Score	Result	Judges	Hosts
Friday (October 23, 2026) #ShowtimeSeventeenig	Gay Division				Nicole Cordoves; Cristine Reyes; Mavy Legaspi	Vice Ganda; Anne Curtis; Vhong Navarro; Jhong Hilario
Friday (October 23, 2026) #ShowtimeSeventeenig	Wit Lang!				Nicole Cordoves; Cristine Reyes; Mavy Legaspi	Vice Ganda; Anne Curtis; Vhong Navarro; Jhong Hilario
Friday (October 23, 2026) #ShowtimeSeventeenig	**Iyah Mina Mina Eh Eh Waka Waka Eh Eh (Iyah Mina)**	**Echague, Isabela**	**10**	**Advanced**	Nicole Cordoves; Cristine Reyes; Mavy Legaspi	Vice Ganda; Anne Curtis; Vhong Navarro; Jhong Hilario
Friday (October 23, 2026) #ShowtimeSeventeenig	Anton Wanna Miss Ateng (Anton Diva)	Cainta, Rizal Province	8.0	Eliminated	Nicole Cordoves; Cristine Reyes; Mavy Legaspi	Vice Ganda; Anne Curtis; Vhong Navarro; Jhong Hilario
Friday (October 23, 2026) #ShowtimeSeventeenig	**La Isla Donita (Donita Nose)**	**General Trias City, Cavite**	**10**	**Advanced**	Nicole Cordoves; Cristine Reyes; Mavy Legaspi	Vice Ganda; Anne Curtis; Vhong Navarro; Jhong Hilario
Friday (October 23, 2026) #ShowtimeSeventeenig	**Pretty Pepay Aguilar (Pepay)**	**Bacolod City, Negros Occidental**	**9.0**	**Advanced**	Nicole Cordoves; Cristine Reyes; Mavy Legaspi	Vice Ganda; Anne Curtis; Vhong Navarro; Jhong Hilario
Friday (October 23, 2026) #ShowtimeSeventeenig	Queen Dura the Explorer (Queen Dura)	Rodriguez, Rizal Province	8.0	Eliminated	Nicole Cordoves; Cristine Reyes; Mavy Legaspi	Vice Ganda; Anne Curtis; Vhong Navarro; Jhong Hilario
Friday (October 23, 2026) #ShowtimeSeventeenig	Beklamation				Nicole Cordoves; Cristine Reyes; Mavy Legaspi	Vice Ganda; Anne Curtis; Vhong Navarro; Jhong Hilario
Friday (October 23, 2026) #ShowtimeSeventeenig	Iyah Mina Mina Eh Eh Waka Waka Eh Eh		—N/a	Third Place	Nicole Cordoves; Cristine Reyes; Mavy Legaspi	Vice Ganda; Anne Curtis; Vhong Navarro; Jhong Hilario
Friday (October 23, 2026) #ShowtimeSeventeenig	La Isla Donita		—N/a	Runner-Up	Nicole Cordoves; Cristine Reyes; Mavy Legaspi	Vice Ganda; Anne Curtis; Vhong Navarro; Jhong Hilario
Friday (October 23, 2026) #ShowtimeSeventeenig	**Pretty Pepay Aguilar**		**—N/a**	**Winner**	Nicole Cordoves; Cristine Reyes; Mavy Legaspi	Vice Ganda; Anne Curtis; Vhong Navarro; Jhong Hilario

==== FUNanghalian Anniversary Special ====
Various FUNanghalian games were re-introduced throughout the special. The following games were featured during the anniversary week:

List of featured FUNanghalian segments during the anniversary week
Game	Description	Teams		Refs.
Game	Description	Winner(s)	Loser(s)	Refs.
Day 1 (Monday, October 19)	Cash-Ya! Kaya!	**Team Vhong**	Team Vice	
Day 1 (Monday, October 19)	In Cash-Ya! Kaya!, two teams compete in challenges that test their strategy, estimation, and teamwork to win ₱10,000 for distribution among the studio audience. The team leaders bid on how many members they believe can successfully complete the assigned task. The winning team receives the prize, while the losing team faces a punishment. In this episode, Team Vhong competed against Team Vice. The challenge required the participants to move a towel from a starting point to a finish line within one minute, with everyone remaining on the towel and no part of their bodies or clothing touching the floor. The entire towel also had to cross the finish line. The bidding began with a rock-paper-scissors game between the team leaders to determine who would bid first. Team Vice initially proposed two participants before settling on six for the challenge. Both teams then attempted to determine how many members could successfully complete the task. During the challenge, Team Vice struggled to coordinate its six participants and failed to cross the finish line within the time limit. Team Vhong consequently won the ₱10,000 prize, which was divided among five audience members receiving ₱2,000 each. Team Vice, meanwhile, faced a punishment requiring its members to shake off all the clothespins attached to their clothing without manually removing them. Teams: Team Vhong: Vhong, Jhong, Karylle, Teddy, Ogie, Wize, and Sheena; Team Vice: Vice, Jackie, Darren, Jugs, Ion, Lorraine, and Johaira	**Team Vhong**	Team Vice	
Day 2 (Tuesday, October 20)	Ansabe?!	**Team C** 4 out of 6 words	**Team A and Team B** 3 out of 6 words each	
Day 2 (Tuesday, October 20)	Ansabe?! is a guessing game in which players attempt to identify words based on mouth movements. The hosts, including those from Showtime Online Ü and Showtime Kids, are divided into three groups: Teams A, B, and C. Each team has a designated leader and a BuliLip (Bulilit Lip) Reader, who must guess six words read individually by six team members. The BuliLip Reader is positioned far from the other hosts to prevent them from hearing the words. Each game lasts one minute and 30 seconds (1:30). The winning team awards ₱10,000 to five randomly selected audience members, who receive ₱2,000 each. The other losing teams received a punishment in which all its members must smash their faces into a pillow covered in baby powder. Teams: Team A: **Vhong**, Karylle, Ryan, Ion, Enicka, Anne, and Jaze; Team B: **Jhong**, Darren, Teddy, Jackie, Briseis, Mackie, and Argus; Team C: **Vice**, Ogie, Jugs, Cianne, Kulot, Imogen, and Kelsey; NOTES: Italicized name indicates the BuliLip Reader; Names in **bold** indicate the group leader	**Team C** 4 out of 6 words	**Team A and Team B** 3 out of 6 words each	
Day 3 (Wednesday, October 21)	No FUNanghalian for this day due to overtime of Miss Q & A: Celebrity Edition — Female Division.			
Day 4 (Thursday, October 22)	No FUNanghalian for this day due to overtime of Laro Laro Pick 17th Anniversary Special.			
Day 5 (Friday, October 23)	No FUNanghalian for this day due to overtime of Miss Q & A: Celebrity Edition — Gay Division.			

==== It's Showtime AWAAARD!: Year 2 ====
The second edition of It’s Showtime: AWAAARD! aired on the final day of the anniversary celebration, October 24, 2026.

The event was hosted by Ryan Bang, Jackie Gonzaga, Darren Espanto, Brent Manalo, and Bianca Umali.

- Special Performance: Showtime Baby Dolls – "Dulce Tirah Tirah"

**Ha? Hakdog**; **Most unforgettable verbal slip or pronunciation error.** **Presented by: Fyang Smith**: **Anne Curtis – Laro Laro Pick [x4]; Miss Q & A: Reyna Talak-era 2026**; Vhong Navarro – Laro Laro Pick [x2]; Jhong Hilario – Tawag ng Tanghalan (Duets 2); Cianne Dominguez – Tawag ng Tanghalan (Season 10); Ogie Alcasid – Laro Laro Pick; Ryan Bang – It's Showtime: AWAAARD! 2025; Kim Chiu – Laro Laro Pick	**Karir na Karir**; **Welcomes any challenges given to them and absolutely owns the moment.** **Presented by: Ruffa Gutierrez**: **Ryan Bang – Miss Q & A: Reyna Talak-era 2026**; Darren Espanto and Ogie Alcasid – Laro Laro Pick; MC Muah Calaquian – Isip Bata, Miss Q & A: Reyna Talak-era 2026; Jugs Jugueta – Rampanalo; Darren Espanto – And the Breadwinner Is…, Laro Laro Pick; Amy Perez – Isip Bata; Lassy Marquez – Miss Q & A: Reyna Talak-era 2026; Ogie Alcasid – Miss Q & A: Reyna Talak-era 2026
**Best Actor in an Eme-Eme Showtime Awaaard Consideration Rule**; **Most compelling performance that captivated the hearts of the audience.** **Presented by: Annette Gozon-Valdes** All scenes were from Laro Laro Pick's "Lights, Camera, Act-Song" round.: **Jhong Hilario and Teddy Corpuz**; Vhong Navarro (Memerimar); Jugs Jugueta; Jhong Hilario; Ryan Bang; Teddy Corpuz; Ogie Alcasid	**Best Actress in an Eme-Eme Showtime Awaaard Consideration Rule**; **Most compelling performance that captivated the hearts of the audience.** **Presented by: Charo Santos-Concio** All scenes were from Laro Laro Pick's "Lights, Camera, Act-Song" round.: **Vice Ganda (Memerimar)**; Jackie Gonzaga; Anne Curtis; Amy Perez; Cianne Dominguez; Kim Chiu; Karylle
**Wow, Sabaw**; **For moments when a host's thoughts become muddled or their mental processing falters during a live broadcast, resulting in amusing lapses in judgment or comprehension.** **Presented by: Kyle Echarri**: **Karylle – Miss Q & A: Reyna Talak-era 2026**; Ryan Bang – Laro Laro Pick, Miss Q & A: Reyna Talak-era 2026; Anne Curtis – Kalokalike: Face 4, Laro Laro Pick [x2]; Vince Maristela – Laro Laro Pick; MC Muah Calaquian – Miss Q & A: Reyna Talak-era 2026, Tawag ng Tanghalan (All-Star Grand Resbak 2025); Jackie Gonzaga – Miss Q & A: Reyna Talak-era 2026	**Words of Wisdom**; **Most memorable quotable line delivered on-air.** **Presented by: Annette Gozon-Valdes and Charo Santos-Concio**: **Vice Ganda and Jhong Hilario**; Brent Manalo – Miss Q & A: Reyna Talak-era 2026; Karylle – Miss Q & A: Reyna Talak-era 2026; Kim Chiu – Tawag ng Tanghalan (Season 10) [x2]; Vice Ganda – Miss Q & A: Reyna Talak-era 2026, Laro Laro Pick; Amy Perez; Cianne Dominguez – Laro Laro Pick; Jhong Hilario – Miss Q & A: Reyna Talak-era 2026, Girl on Fire; Darren Espanto – Tawag ng Tanghalan (Season 10)
**Pero ‘Nay, Aminin Mo: Puwedeng Special Jury Citation ‘To**; **A special jury citation recognizing an exceptionally memorable quotable line delivered on-air.** **Presented by: Annette Gozon-Valdes and Charo Santos-Concio**: **Vhong Navarro – Laro Laro Pick**	**Natutulog Ba Ang Joke?** **For jokes and humorous remarks that failed to elicit the intended laughter or audience response.** **Presented by: Kyle Echarri**: **Ion Perez and Ryan Bang – Miss Q & A: Reyna Talak-era 2026**; Kim Chiu – Expecially for You; Vhong Navarro – Expecially for You; Ion Perez – Miss Q & A: Reyna Talak-era 2026 [x4]; Brent Manalo – Miss Q & A: Reyna Talak-era 2026 [x2]; Ryan Bang – Miss Q & A: Reyna Talak-era 2026; Ogie Alcasid – Miss Q & A: Reyna Talak-era 2026; MC Muah Calaquian – Tawag ng Tanghalan (All-Star Grand Resbak 2025); Jackie Gonzaga – Miss Q & A: Reyna Talak-era 2026; Cianne Dominguez – Miss Q & A: Reyna Talak-era 2026; Karylle – Miss Q & A: Reyna Talak-era 2026; Jhong Hilario – Miss Q & A: Celebrity Edition (Male Division)
**Fallen Star**; **For hilariously memorable on-stage falls, stumbles, and other moments of physical mishap involving hosts and performers during live shows.** **Presented by: Iñigo Jose and Joaquin Arce**: **Ogie Alcasid – Laro Laro Pick [x2]**; Ogie Alcasid and Ralph de Leon – Laro Laro Pick; Vice Ganda and Vhong Navarro – Miss Q & A: Reyna Talak-era 2026; Jackie Gonzaga – Laro Laro Pick; Jhong Hilario – Laro Laro Pick; Ion Perez – Laro Laro Pick; Athan the Cameraman (staff) – Laro Laro Pick, Magpasikat 2026 (Day 1)

===== Special Individual Awards =====
**Best in Live Sound Effects**; **Recognizes outstanding contributions to the show's comedic atmosphere through spontaneous live sound effects that complement the hosts' antics and enhance the humor of on-air segments.**: **Jugs Jugueta**	**It's Showtime: It's About Time Lifetime sa Noontime Award**; **Recognizes Amy Perez for her longstanding contributions to Philippine noontime television, including her years as a host of It's Showtime and other ABS-CBN noontime programs, as well as her nurturing, motherly presence among her fellow hosts.**: **Amy Perez**

== See also ==
- Tawag ng Tanghalan
