= List of It's Showtime cast members =

The following is the list of hosts and cast members of the Philippine noontime variety show It's Showtime.

== Hosts and other cast members ==
=== Hosts ===
Hosts	2009	2010	2011	2012	2013	2014	2015	2016	2017	2018	2019	2020	2021	2022	2023	2024	2025	2026	Ref.
No. of active main hosts	6	6	8	12	12	12	12	15	14	13	13	13	13	16	16	17	17	19	Ref.
Current hosts
Anne Curtis																			
Jugs Jugueta																			
Teddy Corpuz																			
Vhong Navarro																			
Vice Ganda																			
Karylle																			
Jhong Hilario																			
Ryan Bang																			
Amy Perez																			
Jackie Gonzaga																			
Ion Perez																			
Kim Chiu																			
Ogie Alcasid																			
Cianne Dominguez																			
Lassy Marquez																			
MC "Muah" Calaquian																			
Darren Espanto																			
Brent Manalo																			
Ralph de Leon																			
Former hosts
Kim Atienza																			
Billy Crawford																			
Coleen Garcia																			
Eric Tai																			
Mariel Rodriguez																			
Joey Marquez																			
James Reid																			
Nadine Lustre																			

=== Guest co-hosts ===
- Bianca Manalo (2010)
- Iya Villania (2010)
- Nikki Gil (2010–2011)
- KC Concepcion (2010–2011)
- Ina Feleo (2011)
- Denise Laurel (2011–2013)
- Maja Salvador (2011–2015; 2018–2020)
- Georgina Wilson (2011–2012)
- Angelica Panganiban (2012)
- Carmina Villarroel (2012)
- Angel Locsin (2012–2017)
- Enchong Dee (2012)
- Cristine Reyes (2012)
- Erich Gonzales (2013)
- Iza Calzado (2013–2016; 2018)
- Jericho Rosales (2013)
- Jessy Mendiola (2014)
- Alex Gonzaga (2014–2016)
- Sarah Geronimo (2014)
- Robi Domingo (2016–2019)
- K Brosas (2016)
- Luis Manzano (2017)
- Bela Padilla (2017)
- Pia Wurtzbach (2017–2018)
- Ethel Booba (2019)
- JinHo "Song-yupsal" Bae (2019)
- Yassi Pressman (2020)
- Arci Muñoz (2020)
- Catriona Gray (2020)
- Klarisse de Guzman (2021; 2025)
- Maymay Entrata (2022; 2025)
- Petite Brockovich (2023–2024)
- Negi Molina (2023–2026)
- Barbie Forteza (2024–2025)
- Bianca Umali (2023–2026)
- RK Bagatsing (2023)
- Kyle Echarri (2023–2024)
- Michelle Dee (2024)
- Divine Tetay (2024–2026)
- Shuvee Etrata (2025)
- Maris Racal (2025)
- Bianca de Vera (2025)
- Lucas Andalio (2025–2026)
- Brent Manalo (2026)
- Alexa Ilacad (2026)
- River Joseph (2026)
- AZ Martinez (2026)
- Mika Salamanca (2026)
- Belle Mariano (2026)
- Stell Ajero (2026)
- Wilbert Ross (2026)
- Ralph de Leon (2026)
- Alora Sasam (2026)
- Ralph Miaco (2026)

=== Other cast members ===
==== Current cast members ====
- DJ MOD (since 2009)
- DJ Nick (since 2009)
- DJ Alvin (since 2009)
- Ervin "Dumbo" Plaza (since 2009)
- Showtime Dancers (since 2009)
- Six Part Invention (since 2014)
- Tawag ng Tanghalan hurados (since 2016)
- TNT Alumni (since 2019)
- Nerijay "Boom Boom Neri" Lopera (since 2019)
- Baby Dolls (since 2023)
- It's Showtime Kids (formerly called Batang Cute-Po and/or KaraoKids) (since 2023)
  - Argus Aspiras (since 2023)
  - Imogen Cantong (since 2023)
  - Jaze Capili (since 2023)
  - Princess Kathrine "Kulot" Caponpon (since 2023)
  - Arianah Kelsey Lasam (since 2024)
  - Enicka Xaria Orbe (since 2024)
  - Briseis Ericka Quijano (since 2024)

==== Former cast members ====
- May Francisco (2009–2020)
- Mel Feliciano (2009–2020)
- Jhonas Yuzon † (2009–2021)
- XB Gensan (2010–2020)
- Bida Kapamilya Rounds 1 and 2 celebrity mentors (2012–2013)
- Joy Rendon (2012–2013)
- Rhed Bustamante (2012–2013)
- Rodrigo "Kabayan Kalokalike" Manansala (2014)
- Alex Calleja (2014–2020; 2022)
- Angelica Jane "Pastillas Girl" Yap (2015)
- Xia Vigor (2015)
- Miho Nishida (2015)
- Tommy Esguerra (2015)
- Enzo Pelojero (2015; 2020)
- Hashtags (2015–2021)
- Ryan Rems (2015)
- Elly Rose "Birthday Girl" Boñales (2015–2016)
- Bayani Agbayani (2015; 2019)
- Junior Hashtags (2016–2019)
- GirlTrends/GT (2016–2020)
- TNT Band (2016–2020; 2024)
- JJ "Tristan" Quilantang (2017)
- Nicole Cordoves (2017–2019; 2022; 2026)
- Miss Q and A Escorts (2017–2019)
- Donna Cariaga (2017–2018)
- MNL48 judges (2018)
- Andrew E. (2018)
- Stephanie "Stephen" Robles (2018–2020)
- Miss Q and A Queens (2018–2019)
- BidaMan (2019–2020)
- Issa "Sanrio" Meaker (2019–2020)
- Ana Ramsey (2019–2024)
- Christine "Genie-Nga" Samson (2020)
- Donald "Genie-Pon" Neri (2020)
- Aaron Sunga (Mini Yorme) (2020)
- Mini Ms. U Escorts (2020)
  - Jordan Lim
  - Carlo Mendoza
- Versus judges (2021)
- Ruffa Gutierrez (2021–2022)
- Janice de Belen (2021; 2023)
- DGrind dancers (2021–2023)
- Zeinab Harake (2022)
- Sam Coloso (2022–2024)
- Girl On Fire Hataw royalties (2022–2023)
- Gladys Reyes (2023–2024)
- Other It's Showtime Kids
  - Kiarah Ayesha Bajeta (2025–2026)
  - Miguel Canda (2023)
  - Yzah Mae Catipon (2023)
  - Colyn Crisostomo (2023)
  - Lucas Landicho (2023–2024)
  - Stephen Paul Rustia (2024–2025)
  - Migz Sto. Domingo (2023)
- Niño Muhlach (2023)
- Toni Fowler (2023)
- It's Showdown dance royalties (2023)
- EXpecially For You pianists
  - Chuck Joson (2023–2024)
  - Juni Sitaca (2024)
- Rufa Mae Quinto (2024)
- Showtime Baby Dolls (2023-2025)
  - Mary Delle Cascabel (Girl on Fire Grand Champion) (2023)
  - Kim Tubiano (Girl on Fire) (2023–2025)
- Ice Neo "Neyow" Perello (2026)

=== Showtime Online Ü hosts ===
The following are the current hosts of the show's online show, Showtime Online Ü:

- AC Soriano (since 2023)
- Anne Tenorio (since 2019)
- Anthony Castillo (since 2021)
- Eris Aragoza (since 2019)
- Jannah Alanise Chua (since 2024)
- JM Dela Cerna (since 2021)
- Lorraine Galvez (since 2021)
- Mackie Empuerto (since 2024)
- Marielle Montellano (since 2021)
- Nicki Morena (since 2023)
- Sheena Belarmino (since 2024)
- Wize Estabillo (since 2019)
- Zeah Nestle Pala (since 2025)

==== Former hosts of Showtime Online Ü ====
- Adrian Manibale (2021)
- Ana Ramsey (2019–2024)
- Anne Patricia Lorenzo (2023)
- Dan Delgado (2019–2024)
- Donna Cariaga (2018)
- Elaine Duran (2021)
- Janine Berdin (2019–2022)
- Jezza Quiogue (2024)
- Jhon Clyd Talili (2024)
- JM Yosures (2021–2022)
- Josh Labing-isa (2021–2022)
- JR Baring (2019–2022)
- Kristof Garcia (2019–2022)
- Luis Gragera (2021–2022)
- Luke Conde (2018–2021)
- Lyka Estrella (2023)
- Maru Delgado (2018–2022)
- Mary Delle Cascabel (2023)
- Nikko Natividad (2018–2022)
- Psalm Manalo (2021)
- Rachel Gabreza (2021)
- Reiven Umali (2021–2022)
- Ryle Santiago (2018–2021)
- Sam Coloso (2022–2024)
- Shan Dela Vega (2021–2022)
- Shanne Gulle (2021)

== Dance performers ==
=== Hashtags / HT ===
The Hashtags was an all-male dance group that was introduced in November 2015. Former Pinoy Big Brother housemate Zeus Collins served as the choreographer and de facto leader of the group from its inception until the group's disbandment. The following were the pioneering members of the Hashtags along with Collins: Pinoy Big Brother: 737 winner Jimboy Martin; former Pinoy Big Brother housemates Tom Doromal and Jameson Blake; Star Magic artists McCoy de Leon, Paulo Angeles, Jon Lucas, Ryle Santiago and Ronnie Alonte; and finalists of the show's Gandang Lalake segment Nikko Natividad and Luke Conde. It's Showtime opened an application process in November 2016 for new members of the Hashtags with males from 16 to 22 years old eligible to apply. Eight new members were introduced on Valentine's Day of 2017.

==== Former members ====
†	Indicates they are deceased

- Ronnie Alonte (2015–2019)
- Paulo Angeles (2015–2021)
- Jameson Blake (2015–2021)
- Zeus Collins (2015–2021)
- Luke Conde (2015–2021)
- McCoy de Leon (2015–2021)
- Tom Doromal (2015–2020)
- Jon Lucas (2015–2017)
- Jimboy Martin (2015–2021)
- Nikko Natividad (2015–2021)
- Ryle Paolo Santiago (2015–2021)
- Bugoy Cariño (2017–2021)
- Rayt Carreon (2017–2021)
- Maru Delgado (2017–2021)
- Franco Hernandez † (2017)
- Charles "CK" Kieron (2017–2021)
- Vitto Marquez (2017–2021)
- Wilbert Ross (2017–2021)
- Kid Yambao (2017–2021)

=== GirlTrends / GT ===
The GirlTrends was introduced on February 13, 2016, as the distaff counterpart of the Hashtags. Former Pinoy Big Brother housemates and young actresses comprise the group. On May 9, 2019, the girl group was renamed into GT.

==== Former members ====
- Mikee Agustin (2016–2020)
- Loisa Andalio (2016–2017)
- Dawn Chang (2016–2019)
- Kelley Day (2016–2017)
- Jane de Leon (2016–2017)
- Chienna Filomeno (2016–2019)
- Kamille Filoteo (2016–2018)
- Nikki Gonzales (2016–2017)
- Joana Hipolito (2016–2020)
- Barbie Imperial (2016–2017)
- Mica Javier (2016–2019)
- Leyana Magat (2016–2017)
- Jessica Marasigan (2016–2019)
- Miho Nishida (2016–2017)
- Erin Ocampo (2016–2018)
- Riva Quenery (2016–2017)
- Maris Racal (2016–2017)
- Karen Reyes (2016)
- Sammie Rimando (2016–2020)
- Maika Rivera (2016–2019)
- Devon Seron (2016–2017)
- Krissha Viaje (2016–2020)

=== Junior Hashtags ===
==== Former members ====
- Orange Bilgera (2016–2019)
- Aaron Paul Creus (2016–2019)
- Gab dela Cruz (2016–2019)
- JC Gumacal (2016–2019)
- Aevan Laguilles (2016–2019)
- Kiel Ligon (2016–2019)
- Nicoli Lista (2016–2019)
- Nhel Symone Dayrit (2016–2019)

=== BidaMan ===
==== Former members ====
- Eris Aragoza (2019–2020)
- JR Baring (2019–2020)
- Jiro Custodio (2019–2020)
- Dan Delgado (2019–2020)
- Jervy delos Reyes (2019–2020)
- Jay Dizon (2019–2020)
- Wize Estabillo (2019–2020)
- MJ Evangelista (2019–2020)
- Miko Gallardo (2019–2020)
- Kristof Garcia (2019–2020)
- Nathan Garcia (2019–2020)
- Thor Gomez (2019–2020)
- Vien King (2019)
- Polo Laurel (2019–2020)
- Jin Macapagal (2019–2020)
- Ron Macapagal (2019–2020)
- John Padilla (2019–2020)
- Johannes Rissler (2019–2020)
- Yuki Sakamoto (2019–2020)

=== Baby Dolls ===
Baby Dolls are composed of contestants that competed from two segments: Girl on Fire and Sexy Babe. This group debuted on May 8, 2023.

==== Current members ====
- Jelai Ahamil (2023–present)
- Arianne dela Cruz (2023–present)
- Chole Florendo (2023–present)
- Eriel Hamada (2023–present)
- Johaira Moris (2023–present)
- Ina Ortega (2023–present)
- Juby Sabino (2023–present)

==== Former members ====
- Mary Delle Cascabel (2023)
- Kim Tubiano (2023–2025)
