= Jugs Jugueta =

Filipino musician (born 1979)

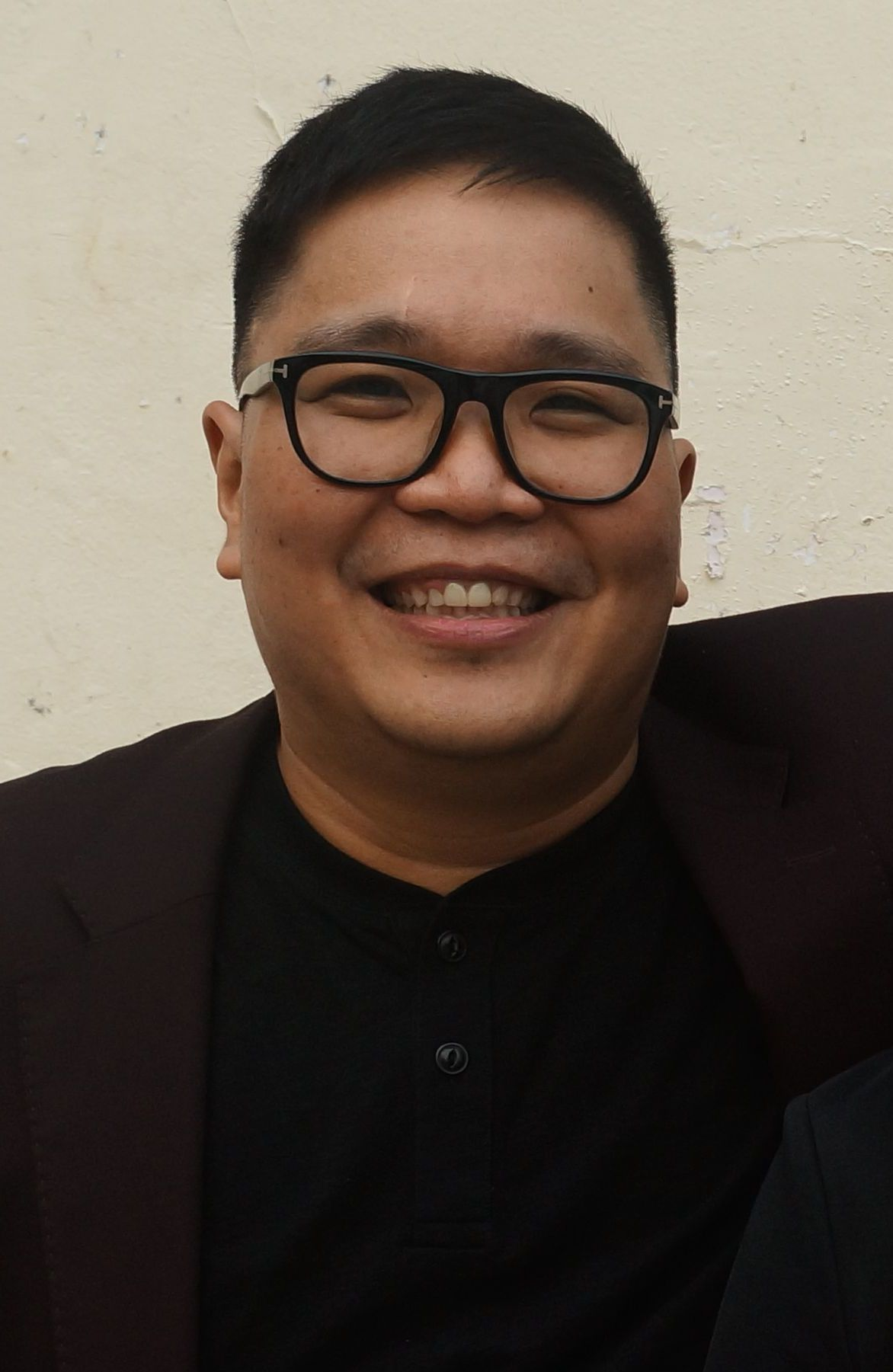
- Jugueta in 2021

Background information
- Also known as: Jugs
- Born: Eric Rommel Jugueta; January 21, 1979 (age 47)
- Genres: Alternative rock; pop rock; power pop; Pinoy rock
- Occupations: Musician; songwriter; television presenter
- Instruments: Vocals; guitar; keyboards
- Years active: 1996–present
- Labels: Viva Records; Universal Records; Sony Music; Star Music
- Member of: The Itchyworms
- Spouse: Andie Aguirre (m. 2015)

Eric Rommel Jugueta (born January 21, 1979) is a Filipino musician, songwriter, and television presenter. He is the co-lead vocalist and founding member of the rock band the Itchyworms, which formed in 1996. He is also a regular host and judge on ABS-CBN's noontime variety show It's Showtime.

== Early life ==
Eric Rommel Jugueta was born on January 21, 1979. He worked as a preschool teacher at a progressive school called Multicenter, located along Pasay Road in Makati. He also had experience as a businessman.

== Career ==
=== The Itchyworms ===
In 1996, Jugueta co-founded the band the Itchyworms with Jazz Nicolas, Kelvin Yu, and Hadrian "Haji" Cruz, and initially performed at school gigs. After some lineup changes, the group released their first independent CD, Revenge of the Unsigned (1998), followed by their major-label debut, Little Monsters Under Your Bed (2001) under Viva Records. Jugueta co-wrote several of the band’s early works, including "Antipara." He later contributed to commercially successful releases such as Noontime Show (2005), followed with the Self-Titled (2008), After All This Time (2013), and Waiting for the End to Start (2020), and collaborated with artists like Ely Buendia on songs such as "Pariwara" in 2016. In 2020, Jugueta and his band released two Christmas tracks titled "Maligayang Pasko" and "Have a Merry Christmas".

Aside from recording, Jugueta has also been involved in writing music for advertising campaigns and television theme songs. He along with the band, wrote and performed "Kabataang Pinoy", the theme song for the first season of ABS-CBN's Pinoy Big Brother: Teen Edition.

=== It's Showtime ===
Jugueta became one of the original hosts of the ABS-CBN noontime variety show It's Showtime when it premiered in October 2009. He regularly co-hosts the program with Rocksteddy's vocalist Teddy Corpuz, and they have participated in various segments of the show, including the annual Magpasikat competition.

=== Other works and collaborations ===
In 2014, Jugueta and Corpuz collaborated for the Himig Handog P-Pop Love Songs competition, interpreting "Walang Basagan ng Trip", a composed by Eric de Leon, which placed fourth in the finals.

In 2022, Jugueta, Corpuz, and Vice Ganda released the song "Kapit Lang", featured in the Star Cinema 2022 film Partners in Crime. The track was written by Corpuz and DJ M.O.D, arranged by Jun Tamayo. It was originally performed by the trio during their 2015 Magpasikat performance on It's Showtime, and its lyric video was later released through ABS-CBN Star Music's official YouTube channel.

== Personal life ==
Jugueta first met his longtime relationship Andie Aguirre in December 2006 at an event organized by a now-defunct radio station where she was working. After seven years of being a couple, they got engaged in 2013 and eventually married in 2015 at the St. Alphonsus Mary de Liguori Parish in Magallanes, Makati.

== Discography ==
=== With the Itchyworms ===
- Little Monsters Under Your Bed (2001)
- Noontime Show (2005)
- Self‑Titled (2008)
- After All This Time (2013)
- Waiting for the End to Start (2020)

=== Collaborations ===
- "Walang Basagan ng Trip" – with Teddy Corpuz (2014)
- "Kapit Lang" – with Teddy Corpuz and Vice Ganda (2022)

== Filmography ==
=== Television ===
Year	Title	Role	Ref.
2009	It's Showtime	Host	
2024	Fast Talk with Boy Abunda	Guest with Teddy Corpuz	
2024–2025	Family Feud	Guest	
