= Kaka (film) =

2021 comedy film directed by G.B. Sampedro

- Promotional release poster
- Directed by: G.B. Sampedro
- Written by: Conn Escobar; G.B. Sampedro
- Story by: Conn Escobar; G.B. Sampedro
- Produced by: Vincent Del Rosario III; Valerie S. Del Rosario; Veronique Del Rosario-Corpus
- Starring: Sunshine Guimary; Jerald Napoles; Ion Perez
- Cinematography: Dom Dycaico
- Edited by: Geoffrey William
- Music by: Francis De Veyra
- Production companies: Viva Films; Five 2 Seven Entertainment Production
- Distributed by: Vivamax
- Release date: May 28, 2021
- Country: Philippines
- Languages: Filipino; English

Kaka Is 2021 Philippine erotic comedy film written by Conn Escobar and G.B. Sampedro directed by G.B. Samepdro. It stars Sunshine Guimary, Jerald Napoles and Ion Perez. Vincent Del Rosario III, Valerie S. Del Rosario, Veronique Del Rosario-Corpus are the producers of the film.

== Plot ==
Katherine "Kaka" Bataan is a vibrant and outspoken radio DJ and sex therapist, renowned for her candid discussions about sexuality on her show. Despite her professional persona and open conversations about sex, Kaka harbors a personal secret, she has never experienced an orgasm.

Her life takes a turn when she meets Levi Sales, a charismatic and seemingly perfect man who introduces her to new experiences. With Levi, Kaka experiences the best sex of her life, leading her to believe she has finally found the one.

In an effort to be the ideal partner for Levi, Kaka decides to transform herself into a more conservative and “prim and proper” lady, deviating from her usual bold and liberated self. This change causes concern for her best friend, Jorge Daco, who disagrees with her decision. Unbeknownst to Kaka, Jorge harbors feelings for her, adding complexity to their friendship.

As Kaka navigates her relationship with Levi and her evolving identity, she also deals with her family's dynamics. Her mother, Kamila Bataan (Kams), and grandmother, Lolita Kirara Bataan (Lola Kiri), each have their own perspectives on love and relationships, influencing Kaka's journey.

Kaka's transformation and the reactions of those around her lead her to question her choices. She must decide whether to continue molding herself to fit someone else's expectations or to embrace her true self, regardless of societal norms and pressures.

== Cast ==
=== Lead Cast ===
- Ion Perez as Levi Sales
- Jerald Napoles as Jorge Daco
- Sunshine Guimary as Katherine "Kaka" Bataan

=== Supporting Cast ===
- Rosanna Roces as Kams/Kamila Bataan, Kaka Bataan's mother
- Gina Pareño as LolitaKirara/"Lola Kiri/Kiri" Bataan, Kaka Bataan's grandmother
- Jackie Gonzaga as Bo
- Maui Taylor as Babet
- Andrea del Rosario as Felicia
- Giselle Sanchez as Sue Petra Sales, Levi Sales's mother
- Sheree as Joy
- Debbie Garcia as Sicee
- Aaliyah as Pre
- Pio Balbuena as Bitoy
- Billy Villeta as Boss Alex
- Josef Elizalde as Rick
- Lander Vera-Perez as Danilo Sales, Levi Sales's father

=== Guest Cast ===
- Janine Teñoso as herself
- Ronnie Liang as himself
- Marion Aunor as herself
- Yuki Sakamoto as Manuel
- Minnie Nato as Amanda
- Ai-Ai Delas Alas as Caller
- Gio Sampedro as Caller
- Marlon Joy Pablo as Caller
- Lotlot Bustamante as Elevator Girl
- Alexine Sy as Party Host

== Release ==
The film was released in the Philippines via streaming in Vivamax on May 28, 2021.

=== Music ===
"Higad Girl" by Vice Ganda was used as one of the official soundtrack of the film.

== Reception ==
JE CC from LionheaTV rate the film 2 out of 5 and wrote:

The debut film of both Ion Perez and Sunshine Guimary is a cyclical hodgepodge of boring material that struggles to arrive at a redemptive resolution–or climax, for that matter.
