= The Mall, the Merrier! =

2019 film by Barry Gonzalez

- Theatrical release poster
- Directed by: Barry Gonzalez
- Written by: Enrico C. Santos; Alpha Habon; Jonathan Albano; Daisy Cayanan
- Produced by: Carlo Katigbak; Olivia Lamasan; Enrico C. Santos; Vic Del Rosario Jr.
- Starring: Vice Ganda; Anne Curtis
- Cinematography: Noel Teehankee
- Edited by: Noah Tonga
- Music by: Emerzon Texon
- Production companies: ABS-CBN Film Productions; Viva Films
- Distributed by: Star Cinema
- Release date: December 25, 2019
- Running time: 123 minutes
- Country: Philippines
- Languages: Filipino; English
- Budget: ₱23 million
- Box office: ₱322 million

The Mall, the Merrier! is a 2019 Filipino musical fantasy comedy film directed by Barry Gonzales and starring Vice Ganda and Anne Curtis. It was co-produced by Star Cinema and Viva Films under the working title Momalland.

The film premiered in Philippine cinemas on December 25, 2019 as one of the official entries to the 2019 Metro Manila Film Festival. The Mall, the Merrier! marks the first on-screen collaboration between Anne Curtis and Vice Ganda, both of whom are regular hosts on the noontime variety show It's Showtime.

== Plot ==
Tanacio and Mola Molina, a couple who own Tamol Mall, have two children, Moira and Morisette. Following their separation, Morisette moves in with her mother, Mola, while Moira remains with her father, Tanacio. Years later, Moira takes over the management of Tamol Mall, while Morisette becomes editor-in-chief of a fashion magazine in Australia working alongside her mother.

When Tanacio and Mola fly to Dubai, the plane crashes. Moira is devastated to learn that both of her parents died in the accident, and Morisette returns home. During the reading of Tanacio's will, it is discovered that the final page is missing, having been left at his home in Zamboanga.

Morisette attempts a hostile takeover of the mall, but Moira claims her right to ownership as the eldest sibling. The two engage in a sales competition, with the winner gaining control of the mall. Ultimately, they compete fiercely but end up in a tie, leaving the ownership unresolved.

During the final reading of Tanacio's will, it is revealed that his only legitimate child, Morisette, is the sole heir to the mall. Moira disputes the decision, insisting that both she and Morisette are legitimate children. However, the lawyer clarifies that Mola was already pregnant with Moira at the time of her marriage to Tanacio. Ultimately, Moira concedes defeat and prepares to leave. Meanwhile, Morisette gets a call from her magazine, requesting her to return to Australia.

Moira discovers a hidden vault behind his parents' wedding photo and finds a spell book called "Siquijoraciones" (a portmanteau of Siquijor and Oraciones). Ignoring a microphone linked to a public announcement system, she reads a spell that animates mannequins, toys, and pictures in the mall. When Moira and Morisette witness the chaos, they join forces to put an end to the magical mayhem.

Moira and Morisette need to read a spell to restore the pictures, statues, and mannequins to normal, only for their spell book to be stolen by a golden cat that has come to life. They are confronted by Moody, a mall janitor, who is actually Mola's older sister and has been on a long quest to find the book.

Moira and Morisette manage to escape from Moody's wrath and come across their old hut, which surprisingly remains intact despite the construction of the mall. Inside, they encounter their parents, Tanacio and Mola, who appear from a wedding photo. Tanacio asks Moira for forgiveness and expresses gratitude for her unwavering support despite his earlier coldness. Moody later joins them for a hug, but when she attempts to take the Siquijoraciones book, the pages scatter, prompting Moira and Morisette to search for the specific page containing the spell.

Morisette discovers the spell and recites it, causing the statues, pictures, and mannequins to revert to their original forms. Meanwhile, Moody is captured by mall security. Before disappearing, Mola advises Moira and Morisette to love each other. Morisette then vanishes completely. When Moira returns to the office, he realizes that Morisette's standee has been with him all along, while the real Morisette is found tied up.

Morisette asks for forgiveness from Moira and shares that she witnessed everything that happened. Morisette, who is preparing to leave for Australia after witnessing the positive reception of Moira at the mall, returns to retrieve her forgotten passport. While there, she learns about the Siquijoraciones but ends up being tied up by a standee of herself that has come to life. Ultimately, both siblings take on the challenge of renovating and managing the mall together.

== Cast ==
=== Main cast ===
- Anne Curtis as Morisette "Setset" Molina
  - Andrea Brillantes as teen Morisette
  - Heart Ramos as young Morisette
- Vice Ganda as Moira / Moises Molina
  - Mimiyuuuh as teen Moira / Moises Molina
  - Josh De Guzman as young Moira / Moises Molina

=== Supporting cast ===
- Dimples Romana as Tita Moody
- Elisse Joson as Mola Molina
- Jameson Blake as Tanacio Molina
- Lassy Marquez as Baks
- MC Calaquian as Tong
- Brenda Mage as Sasha
- Petite as Casim
- Jin Macapagal as Ewan
- Tony Labrusca as Gardo
- Susan Africa as Aling Mae
- Chad Kinis as Lovely
- Matmat Centino

=== Guest cast ===
- Zeus Collins as Lapu-Lapu
- Maja Salvador as Sisa
- Charo Santos-Concio as herself
- Enrique Gil as Robohero
- Ruffa Gutierrez as Annabelle / herself
- Annabelle Rama as herself
- Mark McMahon as Ferdinand Magellan
- McCoy de Leon as Andres Bonifacio
- Donny Pangilinan as Jose Rizal
- Jackie Gonzaga as one of the Post Bastardas
- Yassi Pressman as Maria Clara
- Ion Perez as Richard
- Kirst Viray as one of the Post Bastardos
- Greg Hawkins
- Carlo Mendoza as Totoy
- Miel Espinoza as Tetay
- Marigona Dona Dragusha
- KaladKaren as reported
- Regine Velasquez as herself / singer
- Sarah Geronimo as herself / singer
- Ogie Diaz as Nicole

== Production ==
The development for The Mall, The Merrier was first confirmed in April 2019, when lead actor Vice Ganda announced that he would star together with Anne Curtis in a yet-to-be-named comedy film which is intended to be entered for the 2019 Metro Manila Film Festival. The film was shot in Harrison Plaza in Malate, Manila, before it ceased operations on December 31, 2019. The finale scenes were filmed at Marquee Mall in Angeles City.

== Release ==
The Mall, The Merrier premiered in the Philippines on December 25, 2019 as one of the official entries of the 2019 Metro Manila Film Festival.

=== Critical reception ===
The film received mixed reviews from critics, despite coming in first at the box office. Most of the criticism was directed at its "non-existent" plot, stale humor and poor use of the shopping mall setting.

Oggs Cruz of Rappler lamented what he saw as a wasted opportunity, stating it is "more of the same – and messier" and "while the settings change or the genre it spoofs shift, the elements remain the same. The comedies are all anchored on mean-spirited hilarity, all utilizing a broad moral lesson to make its abject crassness palatable to the families it caters to," comparing it unfavorably to George A. Romero's seminal zombie film Dawn of the Dead whose department store setting was used to satirize consumerism.

Conversely, Jocelyn Valle of PEP.ph gave the film a more positive review, praising the cast, special effects and pop culture references, particularly the feud between the Baretto sisters and the network rivalry between ABS-CBN and GMA Network, a scene where Vice's character Moises and a parodic depiction of the living doll Annabelle from The Conjuring—played by Ruffa Gutierrez—get into a hair-pulling fight and wind up in the premises of the GMA-7 broadcast facility. Valle did, however, criticize the "lack of a strong supporting character for Vice to throw punchlines at and comedic flair" and found Vice's use of a joke pertaining to German dictator Adolf Hitler to be of poor taste in light of Holocaust victims.

=== Television ===
The film was featured on KBO in May 2020, available for pay-per-view. From August to November 2020, The Mall, the Merrier! was available on the cable television channels Cinema One and Kapamilya Channel. PBO on October 10, 2020 A year after its theatrical release, the film premiered on A2Z Channel 11.
