= Dance Kids =

- The titlecard of Dance Kids.
- Genre: Reality dance competition
- Directed by: Johnny Manahan
- Presented by: Robi Domingo; Alex Gonzaga
- Country of origin: Philippines
- Original language: Filipino
- No. of seasons: 1
- No. of episodes: 26

Production
- Executive producer: Peter Edward Dizon
- Production locations: ABS-CBN Studios, SM MOA, Quezon City; SM Mall of Asia Arena , Concert World Manila, Mall of Asia, Metro Manila
- Camera setup: Multiple-camera setup
- Running time: 45-60 minutes
- Production company: ABS-CBN Studios

Original release
- Network: ABS-CBN
- Release: November 14, 2015 – February 7, 2016

Dance Kids is a Philippine television reality competition show broadcast by ABS-CBN. Hosted by Robi Domingo and Alex Gonzaga, it aired on the network's Yes Weekend! line is Yesha Camille up from November 14, 2015 to February 7, 2016, replacing Pinoy Big Brother: 737 and was replaced by I Love OPM. The show ended announcing the Filipino-Canadian duo Lucky Aces as the grand champion.

== Hosts ==
- Robi Domingo
- Alex Gonzaga

== Judges ==
The judges, dubbed as "Dance Masters" of the show:

- Vhong Navarro 'King of the Dance Floor'
- Georcelle Dapat-Sy of G-Force
- Andy Alviz

== The Try Outs ==
In the first phase of the competition named as the "Try Outs", kids will perform in front of the judges known as the "Dance Masters." Performers can come in as a solo act, duo, or as a group.

The acts should be able to impress the Dance Masters at the end of their performance. If a Dance Master is impressed, he/she should stomp on the Stomp Pad. In the event that they get three (3) stomps from the Dance Masters within their performance, the act will automatically make it to next phase of the competition.

However, if the act could not complete all three stomps at the end of their performance, it won't be the end just yet. The Dance Master/s who initially stomped for the act, will have the opportunity to convince their co-Dance Masters to give the acts a chance. If one further declines, then the competition ends for the aspiring dancer or dance group.

The Dance Masters are only allowed to give their unanimous votes 32 times, for the 32 acts who will compete on the next level.

== The Dance Offs ==
The "Dance Off" is the second level of the competition where two acts who made it from the "Try-outs", are chosen to dance against each other. The "Dance Masters" will then choose who among the two acts better by stomping the stomp pad. The act who gets the most stomp will be the one who will go to the "Step Up", the next level of the competition.

== The Step Ups ==
Acts who made it into the "Step Ups" will go to the Quarter Finals, then Semi-finals and ultimately to the grand finals.

== Grand Champion's prizes ==
The grand champion Lucky Aces, has received ₱2,000,000 cash, a house and lot, a family vacation, ₱300,000 worth of shopping spree, and a management contract from Star Magic.
