= Lassy Marquez =

Filipino comedian, actor and TV personality (born 1976)

- Born: Reginald Charias Marquez; October 31, 1976 (age 49); Philippines
- Occupations: Actor; Comedian; TV host; Internet personality
- Years active: 2007–present
- Agent(s): ABS-CBN Corporation (2007–2019; 2023–present); TV5 Network (2021–2023; 2024–present); GMA Network (2023–present); Advanced Media Broadcasting System (2024–present); Viva Artists Agency

Reginald Charias Marquez (born October 31, 1976), professionally known as Lassy Marquez, is a Filipino comedian, actor, performer, host, television personality and entrepreneur. He is best known as a member of the comedy trio Beks Battalion, along with MC Muah and Chad Kinis, and for his appearances as a main co-host on the noontime variety show It’s Showtime. He is also known for his supporting roles in comedy films under Viva Films.

== Personal life ==
Marquez is the oldest of 5 children. His parents moved to Palawan leaving him and his siblings. He worked to support his siblings selling banana cue. The parents went to do a business there but the business didn't go well. Marquez was only able to complete his second year of college.

His first job was a data encoder and after that he became a sales executive in a publishing company. He didn't like the work there but his dream was to work in a office. He also shared in an interview that his father and one of his siblings were ex-convicts.

Marquez is openly gay and active in LGBTQ+ entertainment circles in the Philippines. In May 2024, he publicly mourned the death of his father, Rolando Marquez, and received messages of sympathy and support from fans and fellow entertainers. Vice Ganda and MC Muah are the closest friends of Marquez.

In July 2024, the Marquez house was one of those affected by flash flooding due to Typhoon Carina.

== Career ==
Lassy Marquez began his entertainment career performing in popular comedy bars such as Punchline and Laffline. He quickly gained popularity for his humorous anecdotes, quick wit, and sing-along hosting style and being a sidekick of Vice Ganda.

The nickname "Lassy" was given by his fellow comedian, Chokoleit due to his expressive and flamboyant stage persona and also because at the time the movie Lassie was very popular. Since Lassy often portrays his several "dog" antics, adopted the nickname.

=== Film ===
Marquez has appeared in several Filipino comedy films, often alongside Vice Ganda. His most notable film credits include:

- Sisterakas (2012)
- Girl, Boy, Bakla, Tomboy (2013)
- Beauty and the Bestie (2015)
- Fantastica (2018)
- Sarap Mong Patayin (2021) – a Vivamax dark comedy where he played a more dramatic role.
- Beks: Days of Our Lives (2023) – a film co-starring Chad Kinis and MC Muah that explores LGBTQ+ friendship and resilience.

=== Television ===
In 2023, Marquez joined the cast of It’s Showtime, aired on Kapamilya Channel, A2Z, ALLTV and GMA Network. He became a regular segment host, contributing comedic flair to live skits and games.

In October 2024, he was part of "Team Ogie" during the show's annual Magpasikat week. Their performance—which blended comedy, emotion, and advocacy—won first place.

=== Beks Battalion ===
He is active on YouTube and social media, particularly through Beks Battalion’s online platforms. In an interview Lassy and MC reveal that they used to have an addiction to gambling, having lost over 10 million pesos.

== Filmography ==
=== Film ===
Key
†	Denotes films that have not yet been released

Year	Title	Role	Ref!
2024	And the Breadwinner Is...	Jovie Miyaki	
2023	Beks Days of Our Lives	Reggie	
2022	5 in 1	Chismosang Bakla	
2022	Partners in Crime	Maren	
2021	Sarap Mong Patayin	Noel	
2021	Gandemic	Himself	
2021	Ang manananggal na nahahati ang puso	Gingging	
2019	Papa Pogi	Becky	
2019	Two Love You	Reggie	
2019	The Mall, the Merrier!	Baks	
2018	Fantastica	Chakalyn Jose	
2018	Da One That Ghost Away	Ponzi	
2018	Wander Bra	Erika	
2017	Gandarrapiddo! The Revenger Squad	Bokbok / Flawlessa	
2016	The Super Parental Guardians	Nadine Monio	
2015	Beauty and the Bestie	Jude	
2013	Girl, Boy, Bakla, Tomboy	Waiter	
2013	Bekikang: Ang Nanay Kong Beki	Entoy	
2013	Raketeros	Claudine	
2013	Bromance: My Brother's Romance	Tequi	
2012	This Guy's in Love with U Mare!	Ricky	

=== Television ===
Year	Title	Role
2023–present	It's Showtime	Host
2021	Puto	Cher / Mamita
2019	Manilennials	Churvalyn
2018	Alamat ng Ano	Velma A's Manager
2009–2016	Maalaala Mo Kaya	Yam / Kimberly / Toto / Sashi's Friend / Jade
2013–2014	Juan dela Cruz	Ariel
2011	Mutya	Mameng
2009	Parekoy	
2007	Princess Sarah	

=== Concert ===
Year	Title	Ref
2026	Beks Battallion: The Laff Control Project	

== See also ==
- Vice Ganda
- Chad Kinis
- LGBT culture in the Philippines
