= Franco Hernandez =

Filipino television personality and dancer (1991–2017)

- Hernandez interviewing at Gandang Gabi, Vice!, 2017
- Born: Franco Miguel "Mico" Hernandez Lumanlan; April 1, 1991; Manila, Philippines
- Died: November 11, 2017 (aged 26); Don Marcelino, Davao Occidental, Philippines
- Resting place: The Garden of The Divine Word, Quezon City, Philippines
- Years active: 2015–2017
- Agents: Star Magic (2015–2017); Cornerstone Entertainment (2015–2017)
- Known for: Hashtags dancer; professional dancer; host and actor.

Franco Miguel Hernandez Lumanlan (April 1, 1991 – November 11, 2017), better known as Franco Hernandez or Hashtag Franco, was a Filipino television personality and dancer, who was a member of It's Showtime's all-male dance group called Hashtags. He was also a professional dancer, having been a member of Philippine All Stars in 2010.

== Early life and career ==
Hernandez was born on April 1, 1991. He was the eldest of two children of Raulito Lumanlan and Marissa Hernandez. He had a younger sister named Denise Aileia. He was the third cousin of former Pinoy Big Brother: All In housemate Axel Torres.

Hernandez was part of Philippine Allstars with Megacrew. His group Unschooled Unity in Diversity made history as they were the local winners who represented the Philippines in World Streetdance Battle in 2011 along with his best friend, Benj Manalo. He obtained his bachelor's degree in production design at De La Salle-College of Saint Benilde.

In February 2010, they opened their first dance school, the Allstars Dance School, located in San Juan City, Philippines. The dance school is the realization of the Allstars' ultimate goal, and is their greatest achievement to date. He was the mentor for Allstars Dance School South (ADS South) Presents: Flashback Basic Hip Hop By Mico Lumanlan from Unschooled.

He became a member of the dance group Philippine All Stars. He also appeared in different television advertisements. In 2014, he auditioned for MYX Philippines' search for the newest video jockeys but he didn't get the job. In 2015, he then went to pursue a career in the corporate world Brown Forman developing his public relations and people skills. Apparently, he was offered to be part of the original (first batch Hashtags) but had to decline since he was still new to Brown Forman and it was too early for him to resign. Franco was also visible in a variety of commercials.

== It's Showtime!, Hashtag's Hataw Hearthtrob ==
After two years in the corporate world, Hernandez was offered to be part of Hashtags as a member of the second generation to be introduced in February. He immediately quit his job and pursued his passion of dancing.

On February 14, 2017, It's Showtime introduced Hernandez along with seven other new members as additional members for the all-male dance group called Hashtags. The first batch of the group was introduced in November 2015. He also appeared in different ABS-CBN shows such as Magandang Buhay, Ipaglaban Mo and Gandang Gabi, Vice!.

In his nine months stint as Hashtag Franco Hernandez, he was known for his excellent dancing skills, being compared to Zeus as the second generation's dance god. He also hosted different segments of It's Showtime and was a hurado for several contests in the show with dance component.

He was part of one of Ipaglaban Mo's episodes, entitled "Groufie." He was also part of the IWant series, "Hashtags: Uncovered," where he showed his wares on the dance floor.

Hernandez was managed by Cornerstone Entertainment, Inc., his talent agency up to his death.

== Personal life ==
Hernandez had a relationship with model Janica Nam Floresca up to his death.

== Death ==
On November 11, 2017, Hernandez died of drowning in North Lamidan, Don Marcelino, Davao Occidental, Philippines at the age of 26.

According to his girlfriend's latest interview, they were onboard on a motorized boat when they were all forced to jump when a strong wave hit them on their way back to North Lamidan's coast, Don Marcelino. She also said that at the shore, Franco still had a pulse, despite being unconscious. He was taken to a clinic where he was declared dead on arrival. His wake and funeral were held at Arlington Memorial Chapels and his remains were cremated afterwards, his ashes were laid to rest at The Garden of the Divine Word columbary in Quezon City.
