= Andy Alviz =

Filipino musician

Alejandro "Andy" Pascual Alviz (born December 27, 1963) is a Filipino musician and leader of the musical group ArtiSta.Rita. He seeks to promote the traditional music of his home province of Pampanga both through original compositions and by taking older songs and setting them to a modern beat. His best-known songs include "Masayang Kebaitan", and "Kapampangan ku". "Kapampangan ku", meaning "I am a Kapampangan", was the lead song on the album of the same name; through this song, Alviz sought to elicit feelings of hope and unity among the people of his province. Outside of his own music, he has done the choreography for regional productions of several musicals, including Miss Saigon . What he accomplished in the last 10 years alone is more than what many other artists in the performing arts can accomplish in one or even two lifetimes: as resident choreographer for the Miss Saigon productions in Singapore, Hong Kong, Korea and Manila; as stage director-choreographer for Binibining Pilipinas (from 2004 to 2010); as composer and producer of more than a dozen CDs, including the groundbreaking Kapampangan Ku, which HAU co-produced; as chairman of the board of the ArtiSta. Rita, Inc.; as co-founder of artists' groups like Whiplash Dance Co., ArtiSta. Rita, Teatru Ima and Teatru Kapampangan; as performer in shows and stage productions from Hollywood to New York to Sydney; as choreographer of shows like ASAP and SOP and of concerts featuring Lea Salonga, Kenny Loggins, Gary Valenciano, Sarah Geronimo, Martin Nievera, Ogie Alcasid, Regine Velasquez, Kuh Ledesma, Rachel Anne Go, Christian Bautista, etc.; the list goes on and on.

Alviz influenced the cultural landscape of Pampanga by establishing ArtiSta. Rita as a prominent performing arts organization in the province and developing Kapampangan theater, dance, music, television, radio, and recordings. His songs are frequently used at events, school programs, town festivals, and political campaigns, while his original zarzuelas are featured events in the province's cultural calendar. His musical contributions have been central to the cultural development in the province over the past decade.

The popularity of cultural festivals like the Duman Festival, the Makatapak Festival and the Sabuaga Festival are largely due to their theme songs which were composed by Alviz. The success of the Department of Tourism's campaign can be credited in large measure to the jingle created by Alviz. The electoral victory of Fr. Ed Panlilio as governor of Pampanga was helped in part by Alviz' rousing campaign song. The increase in the number of new seminarians at the Mother of Good Counsel Seminary can also be attributed to Alviz' theatre productions Perry and Ciniong. And Alviz' latest production, I Love Pope Francis: The Musical, co-produced by HAU, was staged at the Cultural Center of the Philippines and was seen by cardinals and bishops from all over Asia. Recently he was a judge for Abs cbn's Dancekids and a stage director for the Grand opening of the grand finals of Pilipinas Got Talent 2018.

== Television ==
| Year | Title | Role | Network |
|---|---|---|---|
| 2015–2016 | Dance Kids | Himself/Dance Masters | ABS-CBN |
| 2019 | It's Showtime | Himself/Magpasikat 2019 Hurado | ABS-CBN |
