= Jackie Gonzaga =

Filipino dancer (born 1994)

- Born: Jackque Gyl Gonzaga; October 31, 1994 (age 31)
- Other name: Ate Girl Jackie
- Occupations: Dancer; actress; television presenter
- Years active: 2017–present
- Known for: It's Showtime

Jackque Gyl Gonzaga (born October 31, 1994), also known as Ate Girl Jackie, is a Filipino dancer, actress and television presenter. She has been one of the hosts of the Philippine variety show It's Showtime since 2019.

== Life and career ==
Gonzaga was raised by her parents, Luisa and Florencio, in Antipolo. She has five siblings: Francis, Patrick, Al Dean, Jain, and Lyndsey. She finished International Studies with a minor at Gender Studies at Miriam College and was a member of the Miriam College Pep Squad for three years.

She was previously in a relationship with Tom Doromal, a former member of the boy group Hashtags.

Gonzaga auditioned and was accepted as a trainee of G-Force, and later she joined as one of the backup dancers in ASAP. She began her career as one of the It's Showtime dancers who gained recognition as Ate Girl Jackie through her on-screen interaction with Vice Ganda in the It's Showtime segment "Miss Q and A", alongside Ion Perez. She later became one of the hosts of the show under the management of Vice. She has also appeared in films, including Fantastica (2018), The Mall, the Merrier! (2019), and Kaka (2021).

She became the first celebrity ambassador of Brightest Skin Essentials.

== Filmography ==
=== Television ===
Year	Title	Role	Ref.
2018–2019	It's Showtime	Herself, Ate Girl in "Miss Q and A" segment	
2020–present	It's Showtime	Herself, Host	

=== Film ===
Year	Title	Role	Notes	Producer	Ref.
2018	Fantastica	Ate Girl	Guest role, Official for the 44th Metro Manila Film Festival Entry	ABS-CBN Film Productions; Star Cinema & Viva Films	
2019	The Mall, The Merrier	one of the Post Bastardas leader	Guest role, Official for the 45th Metro Manila Film Festival Entry	ABS-CBN Studios; Star Cinema & Viva Films	
2021	Kaka	Bo	Supporting role in a film	Viva Films; Vivamax & Five 2 Seven Entertainment Production	
