= Teddy Corpuz =

- Born: Philippines
- Origin: Philippines
- Genres: Pinoy rock; alternative rock; pop rock; pop-punk; rap rock
- Occupations: Singer; TV host; comedian; gamer; streamer
- Instruments: Vocals; guitar
- Years active: 2000–present
- Labels: Sony Music (2005–2007); PolyEast (2008–present)
- Spouse: Jasmin Corpuz (m. 2006)
- Website: Teddy Corpuz on Instagram
- Children: 2

Teddy Corpuz (Tagalog pronunciation: [ˈkɔɾpus]) is a Filipino singer, television presenter, actor and comedian. He is the lead vocalist of the rock band Rocksteddy. He is a regular host and judge on ABS-CBN's noontime variety show It's Showtime.

== Career ==
Corpuz first appeared in the GMA Network sitcom Idol Ko si Kap, and later on became Richard Gutierrez's sidekick in the fantaserye Sugo. He later formed the band Rocksteddy.

He also acted in the indie film, Isnats and is also a part of a comedic group called The Cardio Boys. He hosted the programs Shock Attack, Tawatakutan and he currently hosts the reality talent / dance show It's Showtime on ABS-CBN.

He was reunited with Empoy Marquez for the web show Teddy and Empoy Show, with Rizza Diaz as their first guest.

== Personal life ==
Corpuz is married to Jasmine since 2006. They have two children named Angelica Phoebe and Theodore John. In 2017, he and his wife renewed their vows on-air during the Magpasikat performance with Corpuz, Jugs Jugueta, and Vice Ganda in It's Showtime.

== Filmography ==
=== Film ===
| Year | Title | Role | Ref |
|---|---|---|---|
| 2005 | Isnats | Gani | |
| 2011 | Bulong | Donald | |
| 2011 | Wedding Tayo, Wedding Hindi | Elmer Bautista | |
| 2015 | The Breakup Playlist | Topper | |
| 2017 | Woke Up Like This | Referee | |
| 2019 | Papa Pogi | Romeo | |

=== Television ===
| Year | Title | Role | Ref. |
|---|---|---|---|
| 2004–2006 | Idol Ko si Kap | Himself | |
| 2005 | Maynila | Unknown | |
| 2005–2006 | Sugo | Pikoy | |
| 2008–2009 | Shock Attack | Various roles | |
| 2008–2010 | Ogags | Various roles | |
| 2009–present | It's Showtime | Host | |
| 2010–2014 | Yamaha Yey | Himself | |
| 2011–2016 | Matanglawin | Himself / guest | |
| 2011–2016 | T3: Kapatid Sagot Kita | Teddy Kantatero / segment host | |
| 2012 | Wansapanataym | Haring Kidlat | |
| 2013 | Bet On Your Baby | Celebrity contestant | |
| 2015 | Kapamilya, Deal or No Deal | Celebrity contestant | |
| 2016 | Born for You | Himself | |
| 2016 | Minute to Win It | Himself / player | |
| 2018 | I Can See Your Voice | Himself / Guest artist | |
| 2024 | Family Feud | Himself / Guest | |

== Discography ==
=== Albums ===
With Rocksteddy

- Tsubtsatagilidakeyn (2006)
- PatiPatopanabla (2007)
- Ayos Lang Ako (2008)
- Instadramatic (2013)

=== Singles ===
- Walang Basagan ng Trip with Jugs Jugueta (2014)
- Who We Are with DJ M.O.D. & DCash (2018)
- Praning with DJ M.O.D. & DCash (2018)
- NGPPKRMDMN with Meg Fernandez (2020)
