= Ion Perez =

Filipino actor, model and politician

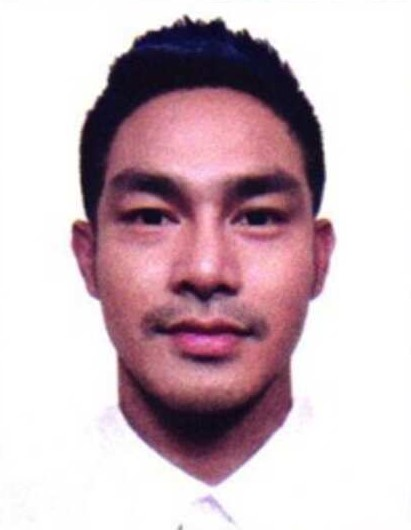
- Perez's certificate of candidacy photo in 2024
- Born: Benigno Dungo Perez; November 27, 1990 (age 35); Concepcion, Tarlac, Philippines
- Occupations: Actor; model; TV host
- Years active: 2018–present
- Political party: NPC (2024)
- Partner: Vice Ganda (2018–present)
- Website: Ion Perez on Instagram

Benigno Dungo Perez (born November 27, 1990), popularly known as Ion Perez (Tagalog: [ˈɐjon ˈpɛrɛs]), is a Filipino actor, model, and television host. He is best known as the Kuya Escort in the Miss Q and A segment of It's Showtime.

He is a regular host on ABS-CBN's noontime variety show It's Showtime.

== Early life ==
Perez is the 11th of 15 siblings with his father a jeepney driver and his mother a kakanin vendor. According to some of his interviews from the past, he was bullied when he was younger because of his lanky frame. As a response, he motivated himself to get fit and take care of himself.

He used to help his parents run a poultry shop inside a wet market. After developing muscles, Perez often went shirtless as a marketing tactic to help draw in customers to his parents' stall.

== Career ==
Perez works as a model having been featured in the bachelors list of Cosmopolitan Philippines fashion magazine. He also participated in pageants. Perez was among the winners of the 2017 Misters of Filipinas and was the winner of the 2018 Mister Universe Tourism. His victories in pageants led him to more opportunities in his modelling career. He was initially hesitant to join pageants. It took three years of convincing from his manager for him to enter pageants. The first-ever meeting of the comedian-host-turned-actor Vice Ganda with her now-husband lon Perez in 2017. That's all thanks to "Gigil Kid" Carlo, who was the one to pick lon from the live audiences and let them have little interactions. They even sang "Pusong Bato" together, which really got everyone entertained. It happened during his guesting in an episode of her defunct talk show Gandang Gabi Vice in October 2017, in which Ion was among the audience and Aga was the guest. Around a year later, Ion became part of It's Showtime without her remembering that they'd already met before again.

Perez first joined ABS-CBN's It's Showtime on September 19, 2018, to audition for the "Kuya Escort" role. He secured the role and eventually became a co-host in the show.

Having been part of It's Showtime for over 5 years, he recently celebrated a milestone by achieving his first win during Magpasikat 2023. He teamed up with Jhong Hilario and Kim Chiu as part of the group called Team JKI. The prize, amounting to 300,000 pesos, was donated to their chosen charity.

In October 2024, he filed his candidacy for councilor in Concepcion, Tarlac under the Nationalist People's Coalition in the 2025 elections. A month later, he withdrew his candidacy.

== Personal life ==
On October 19, 2021, Perez and Vice Ganda had a commitment ceremony at The Little Vegas Chapel in Las Vegas, Nevada USA. On September 19, 2018, he first appeared on It's Showtime, when it happened Vice Ganda and Ion revealed that they had gotten engaged on February 21, 2020, and had undergone a non-legal LGBTQ+ wedding commitment ceremony.

== Filmography ==
=== Television ===
Year	Title	Role	Ref.
2018–2019	It's Showtime	Himself, Kuya Escort in "Miss Q and A" segment	
2020–present	It's Showtime	Himself, co-host	

=== Film ===
Year	Title	Role	Notes	Producer	Ref.
2019	The Mall, The Merrier	Pose Bastardos Leader "Richard"	Guest role, Official Entry for the 45th Metro Manila Film Festival	ABS-CBN Studios; Star Cinema & Viva Films	
2020	Mang Kepweng: Ang Lihim ng Bandanang Itim	Einstein	First Supporting role, Official Entry for the 46th Metro Manila Film Festival	Cineko Productions; ABS-CBN Films & Star Cinema	
2021	Kaka	Levi Sales	First Lead role in a film	Viva Films; Vivamax & Five 2 Seven Entertainment Production	
2022	Partners in Crime	Motorcycle Max	Guest appearance (uncredited), Official Entry for the 48th Metro Manila Film Festival	ABS-CBN Studios; Star Cinema & Viva Films	

== Awards and nominations ==
Year	Award	Category	Nominee / Work	Result	Ref.
2019	5th Rawr Awards	Breakthrough Artist of the Year	It's Showtime	Won	
2020	5th Push Awards	Push True Love of the Year (Shared with Vice Ganda)	Ion Perez	Nominated	
2021	2nd VP Choice Awards	Promising Male Star of the Year	It's Showtime	Nominated	
2023	8th Push Awards	Push Power Couple of 2022 (Shared with Vice Ganda)	Ion Perez	Nominated	
2024	9th Push Awards	Push Power Couple of 2023 (Shared with Vice Ganda)	Ion Perez	Won	
2024	9th Rawr Awards	Love Team of the Year (Shared with Vice Ganda)	It's Showtime	Nominated	
