= Cianne Dominguez =

Filipino television host and singer

- Cianne attending GMA Gala in 2025.
- Born: Tricia Anne Dominguez Florendo; March 18, 2001 (age 25); Taytay, Rizal, Philippines
- Citizenship: Filipino
- Occupations: Television host; Singer
- Years active: 2021–present
- Known for: It's Showtime

Cianne Dominguez (born Tricia Anne Dominguez Florendo; March 18, 2001) is a Filipino television host and singer. She is a co-host of the noontime variety show It's Showtime.

== Career ==
Dominguez attracted her firsts round of fame by participating on It's Showtime's "Sexy Babe". This was quickly followed by Dominguez's being a semi-regular host to the same noontime show.

She served as a singer in show performances and been involved in many show promotions and activities.

== Legal complaints ==
On April 11, 2024, Dominguez reported an incident at her condominium in Quezon City. According to police and media reports, a man identified as Shervey S. Torno, named as the suspect in Dominguez's complaint, tailed her, arrived at her unit and tried to kiss against her will. Dominguez fought back and the suspect run away, only to be caught by the security guards.

Dominguez had filed a criminal complaint against Torno on counts of Violence Against Women and Children and trespassing. According to the Quezon City Police Department, charges will be filed against the suspect concerning the incident, says the prosecutor's office.

In a subsequent interview, Dominguez said that she confronted the defendant in the courtroom and ultimately felt she can forgive.

== Filmography ==
=== Television programs ===
Year	Title	Role	Notes	Ref.
2022–present	It's Showtime	Herself	Co-host	
2026	Pinoy Big Brother: Collab 3.0	Herself	Housemate	
