= 2019 Box Office Entertainment Awards =

Annual Philippine entertainment awards

- Date: March 24, 2019
- Location: Star Theater, CCP Complex, Pasay

Television/radio coverage
- Network: ABS-CBN
- Directed by: Bert de Leon

The 50th Guillermo Mendoza Memorial Scholarship Foundation Box Office Entertainment Awards (GMMSF-BOEA) was an awarding ceremony honoring the actors, actresses, showbiz personalities, movies and TV programs in the Philippines. It was held on March 24, 2019 at the Star Theater, CCP Complex, Pasay.

== Winners selection ==
The GMMSF honors Filipino actors, actresses and other performers' commercial success, regardless of artistic merit, in the Philippine entertainment industry. The award giving body selects the high-ranking Philippine films for the calendar year 2018 based on total average rankings at box office published results as basis for awarding the three major categories in the awarding ceremonies, The Phenomenal Box Office Star, The Box Office King and The Box Office Queen.

=== Winners ===
==== Film ====
Award	Name of Winner	Movie / Show
Golden Jury Award for Highest Grossing Film of All Time	Kathryn Bernardo, Daniel Padilla	The Hows of Us
Phenomenal Box Office Star	Kathryn Bernardo, Daniel Padilla	The Hows of Us
Phenomenal Box Office Star	Vice Ganda, Dingdong Dantes, Richard Gutierrez	Fantastica
Box Office King	Vic Sotto, Coco Martin	Jack Em Popoy: The Puliscredibles
Box Office Queen	Maine Mendoza	Jack Em Popoy: The Puliscredibles
Film Actor of the Year	Dennis Trillo	One Great Love
Film Actress of the Year	Kim Chiu	One Great Love
Prince of Philippine Movies and Television	Joshua Garcia	I Love You, Hater, Ngayon at Kailanman
Princess of Philippine Movies and Television	Julia Barretto	I Love You, Hater, Ngayon at Kailanman
Movie Supporting Actor of the Year	JC de Vera	One Great Love
Movie Supporting Actress of the Year	Nova Villa	Miss Granny
Most Popular Loveteam of Movies	James Reid, Nadine Lustre	Never Not Love You
Most Promising Loveteam of Movies	Maymay Entrata, Edward Barber	Fantastica, Da One That Ghost Away
Most Promising Male Star for Movies	Donny Pangilinan	Fantastica
Most Promising Female Star for Movies	Kisses Delavin	Fantastica
Most Popular Male Child Performer	Sebastian Benedict	Jack Em Popoy: The Puliscredibles / Eat Bulaga! (GMA Network)
Most Popular Female Child Performer	Xia Vigor	My Perfect You
Golden Jury Award for All-Time Favorite Actor	Eddie Garcia	Rainbow's Sunset
Golden Jury Award for All-Time Favorite Actress	Gloria Romero	Rainbow's Sunset
Most Popular Film Producers	Charo Santos-Concio, Carlo Katigbak, Malou Santos	Star Cinema (ABS CBN Film Production)
Most Popular Film Screenwriter	Carmi Raymundo /Crystal San Miguel/Gillian Ebreo/Cathy Garcia-Molina	The Hows of Us
Most Popular Film Director	Cathy Garcia-Molina	The Hows of Us
Comedy Actors of the Year for Movies	Jose Manalo/Wally Bayola/Paolo Ballesteros	Jack Em Popoy: The Puliscredibles
Comedy Actress of the Year for Movies	Judy Ann Santos, Angelica Panganiban	Ang Dalawang Mrs. Reyes

==== Television ====
Award	Name of Winner	Show (for individual awards) / Network
TV Actor of the Year for Primetime	Jericho Rosales	Halik
TV Actor of the Year for Daytime	Ken Chan	My Special Tatay
TV Actress of the Year for Primetime	Yam Concepcion	Halik
TV Actress of the Year for Daytime TV	Glaiza de Castro	Contessa
TV Supporting Actor of the Year	Matteo Guidicelli	Bagani
TV Supporting Actress of the Year	Yassi Pressman	Ang Probinsyano
Most Popular Loveteam for Television	Miguel Tanfelix, Bianca Umali	Kambal, Karibal
Most Promising Loveteam for Television	Loisa Andalio & Ronnie Alonte	Wansapanataym: Gelli In A Bottle
Most Promising Male Star for Television	Jameson Blake	Ngayon at Kailanman
Most Promising Female Star for Television	Jo Berry	Onanay
Most Popular TV Program for News & Public Affairs	Kapuso Mo, Jessica Soho	GMA Network
Most Popular TV Program for Primetime Drama	Ang Probinsyano	ABS-CBN
Most Popular TV Program for Daytime Drama	My Special Tatay	GMA Network
Most Popular TV Program for Talent Search, Reality, Talk and Game Show	I Can See Your Voice	ABS-CBN
Most Popular TV Program for Musical-Variety	Sunday PinaSaya	GMA Network
Male TV Host of the Year	Luis Manzano	I Can See Your Voice
Female TV Host of the Year	Toni Gonzaga	ABS-CBN
Best Ensemble Performance	Halik	ABS-CBN
Comedy Actor for Television	Piolo Pascual	Home Sweetie Home
Comedy Actress for Television	Eugene Domingo	Dear Uge

==== Music ====
Award	Name of Winner
Male Concert Performer of the Year	Ogie Alcasid (OA: 30th Anniversary Concert)
Female Concert Performer of the Year	Regine Velasquez–Alcasid (“Regine At The Movies” Concert)
Male Recording Artist of the Year	Gloc 9
Female Recording Artist of the Year	Moira Dela Torre
Most Popular Recording/Performing Group	Ex Battalion
Most Promising Male Recording Artist of the Year	Juan Karlos Labajo
Most Promising Female Recording Artist of the Year	Alex Gonzaga
Most Promising Male Concert Artist of the Year	TNT Boys
Most Promising Female Concert Artist of the Year	Kyline Alcantara
Most Promising Recording/Performing Group	IV of Spades

==== Special awards ====
Award	Name of Winner
Bert Marcelo Lifetime Achievement Award	Marian Rivera
Corazon Samaniego Lifetime Achievement Award	Nora Aunor
Global Achievement by a Filipino	Manny Pacquiao & Catriona Gray
Public Service Award	Anthony Taberna, Gerry Baja
Outstanding Businessman Award	Sam Versoza (Founder, FRONTROW Enterprise Philippines, Inc.)
Global Entrepreneur of the Year	Wilbert Tolentino (Founder, F Club Philippines)
Golden Jury Award for Excellence in Government Service	Rodrigo Duterte
Golden Jury Award for Excellence as Millennial MultiMedia Entertainer	Anne Curtis
Posthumous Award – Golden Jury Award for Excellence as the Philippines’ Business Icon of All Time	Henry Sy (Founder, SM Investments)
