= Maalaala Mo Kaya season 27 =

Maalaala Mo Kaya
- Season 27
- Starring: Charo Santos
- No. of episodes: 47 (excluding re-runs)

Release
- Original network: ABS-CBN
- Original release: January 12 – December 28, 2019

Season chronology
- ← Previous; Season 26 Next → Season 28

Maalaala Mo Kaya (transl. Would you remember?; abbreviated MMK), also known as Memories in English, is a Filipino television series which first aired on May 15, 1991. MMK is the longest-running drama anthology on Philippine television.

== Episodes ==
#	Episode title	Directed by	Written by	Original air date	Ratings
1	"Journal"	Theodore Boborol	Mary Rose Colindres	January 12, 2019 (re-aired on January 4, 2020)	25.4%
The episode follows the story of the couple Alanis and Hennesy, who will fight for their love in spite of their health conditions: Alanis has a chronic kidney disease while Paolo has gastroesophageal reflux disease. Despite his own condition, Hennesy refuses to have himself checked just to be by Alanis' side at all times, giving her priority over his studies. Cast: Barbie Imperial, Paulo Angeles, Rosanna Roces, Isay Alvarez, Mike Lloren, Brace Arquiza, Jourdanne Castillo
2	"Jersey"	Darnel Joy R. Villaflor	Bing Castro Villanueva	January 19, 2019	26.7%
Paul Desiderio is an aspiring athlete, son, and student. His resilience and dedication take him to greater heights when he becomes responsible for leading his team UP Fighting Maroons to the Men's Basketball Finals of UAAP, after more than three decades. Cast: Ronnie Alonte, Ariel Rivera, Loisa Andalio, Bernadette Allyson, Marco Masa, Yñigo Delen, Eda Nolan, Jon Lucas, Minco Fabregas, Noel Colet, Axel Torres, Miko Raval, JB Agustin, Ashley Sarmiento, Andrew Muhlach, Myle De Leon, Tom Doromal, Arkin del Rosario, Jan Urbano
3	"Pregnancy Test"	FM Reyes	Akeem del Rosario	January 26, 2019	27.7%
Cast: Ritz Azul, Ahron Villena, Irma Adlawan, Lito Pimentel, Arlene Muhlach, Carlos Morales, Victor Silayan, Louise Abuel, Belle Mariano, Jef Gaitan, Ben Isaac, Kirst Viray, Daniela Carolino, Erika Clemente
4	"Family Portrait"	Nuel C. Naval	Joan Habana	February 2, 2019	22.0%
Sen. Edgardo "Ed" Angara has served the Filipino people with great care and support for many years. As the patriarch of his family, he promised to spend time with his wife and children. However, by the time he becomes senator, things have changed; his busy schedule has kept him from bonding with them, straining their relationship. Will he ever forgive them and offer a new hope? Cast: Christopher de Leon, Sandy Andolong, Alexa Ilacad, James Blanco, Sandino Martin, Raikko Mateo, Claire Ruiz, Michelle Vito, Danita Paner, Ana Abad Santos, Joel Molina, Jong Cuenco, Cindy Miranda, Simon Pineda, Mark Rivera, Hannah Vito, Lilygem Yulores, Arhia Faye Agas
5	"Steak"	Elfren Vibar	Mae Rose Balanay	February 9, 2019	25.0%
Christopher "Bong" Go has hatred with his father due to his principles. But his luck changes when he becomes the Assistant of the then-Mayor and eventually President of the Philippines Rodrigo Duterte. His loyalty to his boss has shaped him into the man he has become. Yet there is one thing that he still has to accomplish, to be a family man. Cast: Phillip Salvador, Joseph Marco, Nonie Buencamino, Shamaine Buencamino, Leo Martinez, Meg Imperial, Carla Martinez, Andre Garcia, Raine Salamante, CX Navarro, Clarence Delgado, Marc Santiago, Chloe Espiritu
6	"White Ribbon"	Raymund B. Ocampo	Mary Rose Colindres	February 16, 2019	27.2%
Moira Dela Torre has always longed for a complete and happy family and it breaks her when her dreams do not come true. She tries to find herself and her purpose in different ways. She even joins The Voice and enters showbiz. She finally feels complete when she surrenders her life to her faith. From then, things start falling into place for her including finding true unconditional love in her best friend of seven years, Jason (Kiko) Cast: Vina Morales, Janella Salvador, Kiko Estrada, Gloria Sevilla, Richard Quan, Jeric Raval, Markus Paterson, Joe Vargas, Chunsa Chung, Bea Basa
7	"Lotion"	Eduardo Roy Jr.	Bing Castro-Villanueva	February 23, 2019 (re-aired on March 5, 2022)	26.1%
Bernadette is born with dark, rough skin, bulging eyes and a facial deformity known as Crouzono-dermo-skeletal syndrome. Her mother, Jona, believes it is a curse on their family, but still tries her best to accept the child. Due to her mother's hesitation to accept her, Bernadette feels unloved and tries to seek affection from other people. One day she gets pregnant but is left hanging by the man whom she thought had truly loved her. Cast: Mary Joy Apostol, Meryll Soriano, Arnold Reyes, Marc Acueza, Teejay Marquez, Patrick Sugui, Miel Espinoza, Karla Pambid, Lance Lucido, Teetin Villanueva, Yesha Camile, Krystal Mejes
8	"Mansanas" "Apple"	Carlo Po Artillaga	Akeem Del Rosario	March 2, 2019	30%
Emman has always wanted to finish his studies but because of the hardships in life, he has opted to work instead in a bakery. There, he meets the woman of his dreams, Maricar (Denise), who also happens to be his boss. Maricar's family does not like Emman for her because they do not think he will be able to provide for her future as he did not finish his studies. But they fight for their love as Emman works hard to achieve his dreams of finishing school and to prove himself to Marica's parents. Cast: Joem Bascon, Denise Laurel, Tetchie Agbayani, Xia Vigor, Levi Ignacio, Zeppi Borromeo, Micah Muñoz, Kaiser Boado, Vernon Hanwell, Arhia Faye Agas
9	"Painting"	Barry Gonzales	Joan Habana	March 9, 2019	25.8%
Ancel has always been insecure of her looks because of her heavy weight. She is often used to connect suitors to her beautiful and thin friends. That changes when she meets Mark, the popular basketball player in their school who falls head over heels in love with her despite her weight and insecurities. Cast: Elisse Joson, Kit Thompson, Epi Quizon, Bernard Palanca, Cheska Iñigo, Joj Agpangan, Alexa Miro, Patty Mendoza, Yasmyne Suarez
10	"Black Belt"	Jerome Pobocan	Dickson Comia	March 16, 2019	29.7%
Ramon grows up in a poor community in Bicol and is abandoned by his father at an early age. From the province, he goes to Manila hoping to give his family a better future and to be able to finish his studies. One day, his professor encourages him to try karate to earn a scholarship. His hard work pays off when a Singaporean Kyokushin karate trainer, Sensei Steven (Atoy Co), discovers him and helps him finish high school and become a Karate champion. As his dreams are slowly turned in his favor, another setback arises when his girlfriend gets pregnant and eventually betrays him. Cast: JM De Guzman, Allan Paule, Glenda Garcia, Mon Confiado, Atoy Co, Erin Ocampo, Japoy Lizardo, Yñigo Delen, Martha Comia
11	"Chess Board"	Elfren Vibar	Mae Rose Balanay	March 23, 2019	27.5%
Life has always been hard for Victorio, who became a construction worker at the age of twelve to help his sick father and their family survive. He always had close brushes with the authorities for drug-dealing but eventually gets caught and jailed. His father Nitoy's heart is broken by his son's troubles and is left to fend for himself amid his failing health. This leaves Victorio despairing and depressed while inside the prison. He gets initiated into a gang and is beaten by fellow inmates. He also gets brutally coerced by authorities to give up the names of his drug-dealing comrades but keeps his mouth shut for fear of his family's fate outside. Victorio soon finds enlightenment and discovers a way to continue studies while inside prison. After studying for two years, he is released for being one of the topnotch high school graduates in the city and is eventually offered a scholarship in the Quezon City Polytechnic University. Cast: Vance Larena, Ronnie Lazaro, JB Agustin, Angelo Ilagan, Kiko Matos, Luke Alford, Christian Morones, Lance Lucido, Dido Dela Paz
12	"600 Pesos"	John Lapus	Akeem Del Rosario	March 30, 2019	30.6%
Judith and her family suffer from discrimination throughout their lives. But when the opportunity to be the Aeta tribe's representative at the "Mutya ng Biaan" came, Judith discovers a strength she never knew she had. Her parents Jocelyn (Mercedes Cabral) and Henry, who both cannot read and write, have taught her to put education above everything. Her sister April even sacrifices her own education so they could afford to send Judith to school. One day, April gets invited to join the "Mutya ng Biaan" pageant to represent their Aeta community for the first time. When Judith sees the acceptance and support given by other people for her sister, she feels motivated to follow in April's footsteps. Upon Jocelyn's advise, Judith decides to prioritize her studies and even moves to the city of Balanga, Bataan to do this. Unfortunately, she skips school because of the discrimination she once more faces from the locals. Judith soon finds out the sacrifices her entire family made because they hoped so much for her future. Soon, her father becomes ill. Worried because her family has no means to pay for his medicine, Judith decides to stop studying and work at a shoe factory. Judith's life changes when she is invited to join the "Mutya ng Biaan." She now sees this as an opportunity to help her family financially, help her get an education, and get the recognition she and her community need. Defying her own mother's wishes, Judith remains firm with her decision. Judith wins the "Mutya ng Biaan," and ranks ninth in the "Mutya ng Mariveles" 2019. She uses her prize money to provide food for that her fellow Aetas never had the luxury to have. Even after being a beauty queen, Judith still plans to finish her studies. Cast: Maymay Entrata, Nyoy Volante, Mercedes Cabral, Mara Lopez, Sue Prado, Amy Nobleza, Jai Agpangan, Erika Clemente, Josh de Guzman
13	"Rattle"	Frasco Mortiz	Bing Castro Villanueva	April 6, 2019	23.7%
Anna struggles to have a perfect family life, being abandoned and adopted as a G.I. baby. She was taken in by Mama Rossie, an active member of the church. Eventually, they settle down in Anak Bayan, Paco, Manila where she meets her cousin, June whom she falls in love with and marries. Soon, the couple bear a first-born with autism, John Paul. With a second child on the way, they hope their second child would be different from the first one. But Joshua, their second son, turns out to have the same condition. Eventually, the couple have a third child, Judith. This time, she is born without autism. Having two children with autism turns out to be difficult for the newlyweds. Anna fight for her children as June loses his way to infidelity. Anna protects her two sons, John Paul and Joshua from society's judgmental eyes, while June soon tries to be the father and partner for their struggling family. Later on, Anna and June's unconditional love for their family prevails. The couple is now part of the Servants of Charity, mostly a community of abandoned Filipino children with autism. Anna and June have embraced their true calling and become volunteers and motivational speakers on building a family full of understanding and acceptance for people with autism and special needs. Cast: Nikki Valdez, Joross Gamboa, Daria Ramirez, JM Ibañez, Onyok Pineda, Myel De Leon, Harvey Bautista, Mitch Naco, Elia Ilano, Ruby Ruiz, Dwight Gaston, Jourdanne Castillo, Rommel Velasquez
14	"Kumelavoo"	Richard Arellano	Dickson Comia	April 13, 2019 (re-aired on July 30, 2022)	27.5%
Bryan Tagarao struggles throughout his childhood but always fights through with humor and grace. Even though he was teased as ugly and for being gay, his beautiful persona shines through. The Cagayan de Oro native has a hard time fitting in, even though he comes from a family of comedians. At home, life is taken very seriously. His father Romeo prevents him from being openly gay. Bryan is bullied so much for being gay and different, but he shows that he was more than what his friends characterized him. He gives up his own education so he could help his family, and eventually became the breadwinner, selling corn and burgers, and working as a janitor. As an adolescent, Bryan struggles even more with trying to appear more "manly" in front of his family to make them feel proud of him. But he fights his insecurities and becomes boy band PH's personal assistant. At 21, Bryan comes out and decides to embrace his gender identity. When he learns how to cross-dress, "Brenda Mage" was born. As Brenda, he gets acting jobs in indie films and becomes an entertainer in Japan. He also starts vlogging, earning better money for his family. Brenda starts earning bigger when she is invited to perform at comedy bars. Her family are supportive, especially his mother, and she gains the respect of his father in the process. Eventually, Brenda is crowned "It's Showtime's" Miss Q and an Intergalactic and reigns even more in her personal and professional life. Bryan shows that no matter how unfairly society treats people, one must stay strong to achieve one's dreams. Cast: Bembol Roco, Awra Briguela, Tanya Gomez, Jayson Gainza, Danita Paner, Kitkat, Via Antonio, MJ Cayabyab, Lao Rodriguez, Brenda Mage
15	"Dance Floor"	Rag Dela Torre	Mary Rose Colindres	April 27, 2019	22.2%
RJ grows up in Brunei with his doting aunt and adoptive mother, Vivian. With Vivian's full support, he pursues dancing and hones his craft when the two come home to the Philippines. Seeing how dedicated RJ is, Vivian pushes him to reach his goals. But while he begins to dream of being a professional dancer and well-known Dancesport competitor, RJ gets diagnosed with Guillain-Barré Syndrome (GBS), a rare neurological disorder which causes progressive paralysis, starting from the feet and progressing throughout the rest of the affected person's body. RJ battles with the disease for a year and the two almost give up on their dreams. But Vivian sees RJ fighting in spite of his physical limitations. Eight months later, RJ recovers from GBS and makes it to numerous local and international Dancesport competitions, which leads to a bittersweet reunion with his biological parents, Maya and Robert. Soon, the two try to take RJ back from Vivian because of his newfound glory. But RJ chooses to stay with Vivian, the only person he considers to be his real family. Cast: Jameson Blake, Ces Quesada, JJ Quilantang, Kathleen Hermosa, Regine Tolentino, Art Guma, John Bermundo, CJ Javarata, Claudine Barretto
16	"Jacket"	Paco Sta. Maria	Joan Habana	May 4, 2019	27.4%
Despite being poor and unable to finish his studies, Dong has always persevered in life. He became a tahô vendor at the University of the Philippines at Diliman, QC, where he was a hit with students and academicians because of his positivity and light-hearted manner. After a 10-year relationship, 44-year-old Dong meets and falls in love with the 22-year-old Catherine. Their May–December love affair causes a rift between their own families. Dong fights for their relationship and even treats Catherine's daughter from her previous relationship, as his own. He eventually earns the respect and approval of his wife's relatives through his genuine care for Catherine's family. Catherine gets an opportunity to work in Bahrain as a domestic helper and decides to take it, to Dong's frustration. She said it will help in their finances and help their other two kids go to school. Upon the departure of his wife, Dong becomes weak physically and emotionally. He becomes quiet and stops being the funny father he used to be because he misses his better half so much. His body eventually gives up, and he is diagnosed with a lung disease. Dong pursues selling taho because he wants all of their children to get the education he and his wife were not able to attain. Aurain their eldest, convinces his father she would stop going to school to help out the family. For a while she is able to help until she gets pregnant. Despite this, Dong uses his sense of humor to lighten up his family's mood and saves enough money for his two other bright children's education. Dong and Catherine, although apart, hope for the future of their family. Cast: Empoy Marquez, Heaven Peralejo, Jennica Garcia, Brenna Garcia, Yesha Camile, Alyssa Muhlach, Karen Toyoshima
17	"Stationery"	Barry Gonzalez	Akeem Del Rosario	May 18, 2019	24.4%
Carol and Erlwin's love for music make them instant friends. However, their time together is cut short after Erlwin returns to his province. But distance does not hinder them from developing feelings for each other as they exchange letters for eight years, maintaining the relationship they have built. Years pass and they decide to meet again, but Erlwin does not make it in time to meet Carol. In pain, Carol vows to forget her feelings for Erlwin and moves on with her life. After several years, Carol meets a man whom she falls in love with, and they decide to get married. But as their wedding day nears, Carol crosses the path with Erlwin. Their encounter brings back Carol's feelings for her old fling, which tests her love for and faithfulness to her fiancé. Cast: Maris Racal, McCoy De Leon, Sharmaine Suarez, Candy Pangilinan, Karl Gabriel
18	"Divet"	Cathy Camarillo	Bing Castro Villanueva	May 25, 2019	24.1%
Growing up poor, Diana desires to finish her studies to give her family a bright future. But her parents think otherwise, believing marrying a man from a family of farmers would give her a comfortable life. This pushes Diana to leave her family and try her luck in Manila where she works as a helper. Her employers instantly notice her dedication and help her finish college. She eventually lands a job in the municipal office, which helps her provide for her parents in the province. She then meets Victor, the man whom she fell for and becomes her husband. However, the man she thought would complete her life was also the one who would destroy her dreams for her family as Victor becomes an alcoholic and constantly hurts their children. Cast: Pokwang, Allen Dizon, Ruby Ruiz, Erika Clemente, Kat Galang, Kokoy de Santos, Noel Colet, Marithez Samson, Nhikzy Calma, Elora Españo, Jessica Marco
19	"Passport"	Nuel C. Naval	Joan Habana	June 1, 2019 (re-aired on April 2, 2020)	28.4%
Nena (Irma Adlawan) is admired in her community for her dedication as a teacher for 32 years. She eventually decides to retire and put up her own business to spend more time with her family. However, her dream of having a better life is instantly taken away after her business partner takes all the money she has. On the verge of giving up, she finds a high paying job as a caregiver in the US, hoping to regain everything she lost. But things do not go as planned as Nena learns that the person who recruits her is a human trafficker and forces her to work as a house help for an abusive Filipino family. She gets maltreated, is underpaid, and even made to sleep with the dogs by her employers, putting her in constant misery. Determined to escape her horrible situation, she then meets a young American boy who she hopes could be her way to finally break free from her ill-fated life. Cast: Agot Isidro, Alexa Ilacad, Soliman Cruz, Luz Fernandez, Anna Luna, Junjun Quintana, Carla Martinez, Suzette Ranillo, Racquel Monteza, Ivan Padilla, Markki Stroem, Jason Dewey, Patty Mendoza, Joyce Ann Burton, Sonjia Calit, Roy Requejo, Irma Adlawan
20	"Wheelchair"	Wilfredo Manalang	Mary Rose Colindres	June 8, 2019	22.8%
Melvin (Enchong Dee) was a man who has dreams for his future, while he has a son diagnosed with Down Syndrome named Michael (Zaijan Jaranilla) that to save his life about this disability. He then meet sRoselita (Claire Ruiz) after graduation. A year later they marry and have their first son, but he is later diagnosed with autism while their second child is also born with it. Arguments surface and Michael has to take decisions about the situation. Cast: Amy Austria, Zaijian Jaranilla, Allan Paule, Claire Ruiz, Xia Vigor, Onyok Pineda, JJ Qilantang, Josef Elizalde, Maika Rivera, Enchong Dee
21	"Balsa" "Raft"	Carlo Po Artillaga	Joan Habana	June 15, 2019 (re-aired on April 9, 2022)	25.1%
Ryan hails from a poor family, but this does not stop him from finishing school with the help of his loving father Ramon. He perseveres and becomes a public-school teacher, and vows to help the kids in his community get the education he was fortunate to have. However, a major hindrance to his goal is their barrio's location; it is separated from the town by a river, making it difficult for the kids to attend school. This pushes Ryan to build a raft he calls "Balsa Basa" where he can teach kids. Despite his pure intentions, many cast doubts on his plans, with some parents worrying for the safety of their children. His own father even discourages him and tells him to stop his ambitions. A bigger turmoil shakes his determination as a strong typhoon hits them while sailing in the middle of the river, putting him and his students' life in danger. This ignites a stronger crusade to end his passion project. Cast: Zanjoe Marudo, Isabelle Daza, Joey Marquez, Andrez Del Rosario, Raikko Mateo, Yñigo Delen, Xymon Pineda
22	"Medalya" "Medal"	Richard Arellano	Dickson Comia	June 22, 2019	30.8%
At age 21, Ian dies after a clash against the Moro National Liberation Front in Zamboanga City in 2013. Cast: Joshua Garcia, Cris Villanueva, Mary Joy Apostol, Art Acuña, Ingrid dela Paz, Alex Castro, Ryle Paolo Santiago, Aljon Mendoza, Allyson McBride, Myel de Leon, Enzo Pelojero, Janice de Belen
23	"Choir"	John Lapus	Ruel Montañez and Noreen Capili	June 29, 2019	26.7%
When Jenny meets Jan-Luis at school and eventually becomes part of a church choir, it seems she has witnessed and felt the harmony and beauty of a fairy tale love story. But it does not take long before Jenny realizes that her feelings for Jan-Luis are overwhelmed by the reality of love—a sordid tale of hurt and despair. She experiences being used and cheated on, thrown off like a bridge to court another girl, and as a result of these, the pain goes to her core. Jenny still endures the hurt and hopes that this fairy tale is still what she expected. When Jan-Luis says he has fallen for her and she reciprocates it, and they became a couple, Jenny's ordeals did not stop as he cheats on her once more, leading her to fall desolate. She eventually learns from her mom, who discovers her weeping at their living room, that pain is part of being in love, and in deciding to continue or move on from a relationship, she must consider if she can endure life with or without him. Cast: Vivoree Esclito, CK Kieron, Valerie Concepcion, Michael Flores, Charlie Dizon, JC Alcantara, Yong Muhajil
24	"Third Eye"	Topel Lee	Chie Floresca	July 6, 2019	23.2%
Peachie struggles to find the true purpose of her supernatural ability. Cast: Jolina Magdangal, Robert Seña, Isay Alvarez, Victor Silayan, Yesha Camile, Myel de Leon, Rolando Inocencio, Benj Manalo, Andrew Gan
25	"Sinturon" "Belt"	Barry Gonzalez	Bing Castro Villanueva	July 13, 2019	24.5%
Marrz Balaoro fights through the challenges in his life in order to celebrate himself as a transgender man. Cast: Anne Curtis, Rita Avila, Carlos Siguion-Reyna, Bianca King, Krystal Mejes, Chunsa Jung, Vito Quizon, Jef Gaitan, Karla Pambid, Hanna Ledesma, Tart Carlos, Debbie Garcia, Zar Donato, Epey Herher, Jesi Corcuera, Rebecca Chuaunsu, Jordan Hong
26	"M.V.P."	Raymund B. Ocampo	Akeem Del Rosario	July 20, 2019	25.6%
Cherry Ann "Sisi" Rondina joins the volleyball team of UST Lady Tigresses to support her studies. Her impressive skills in volleyball lead to an event that she thinks will bring pride to her and her school. That event is when her team makes it to the Finals of UAAP Women's Volleyball. Cast: Kim Chiu, Dennis Padilla, Yayo Aguila, Jana Agoncillo, Maika Rivera, Celine Lim, Boom Labrusca, Aiko Climaco, Mara Lopez, Gerald Madrid, Laiza Comia, Khyza Villalino
27	"Tubig" "Water"	Nuel C. Naval	Ruel Montanez and Mae Rose Balanay	July 27, 2019	25.9%
When Sarah ceases her study due to a lack of money, she decides to go home to her family. However, thinking that her problem might be solved, her father arranges a marriage to a soldier named Nelson. Sarah is initially working at the factory. As they marry, they have three children, but during the course of their marriage, Nelson constantly abuses Sarah. Sarah decides to work in Saudi Arabia. Cast: Shaina Magdayao, Bembol Roco, Mon Confiado, Carlos Agassi, Ana Abad Santos, Trina Legaspi, Rhed Bustamante, Lui Manansala, Dino Imperial, Marco Masa, Jimboy Martin, Ali Khatibi, Addy Raj, Alfred Beruzil, Nico Gomez, Lilygem Yulores, Efren Kereci, Bench Ortiz, Bob Jbeili
28	"Simbahan" "Church"	Paco Sta. Maria	Ruel Montanez and Dickson Comia	August 3, 2019	28.7%
A very special love comes into Agnes' life despite her disability. Cast: Gelli de Belen, Jerome Ponce, Daria Ramirez, Alora Sasam, Bing Davao, Ashley Sarmiento, Thea Rizaldo
29	"Youth Center"	Frasco Mortiz	Raymund Barcelon	August 10, 2019	32.4%
Cast: Xian Lim, Anna Luna, Efren Reyes, Jr., Sharmaine Suarez, Izzy Canillo, JB Agustin, Xymon Pineda, Ynigo Delen, Nikka Valencia, Mitoy Yonting, Fino Herrera, Joaquin Reyes, Noel Comia Jr., Royce Cabrera
30	"Dyip" "Jeep"	Cathy Carnarillo	Bing Castro Villanueva	August 17, 2019	33.3%
Cast: Yen Santos, Rafael Rosell, Suzette Ranillo, Raul Montesa, Nico Antonio, Jenny Miller, Tart Carlos, Vito Marquez, Mark Rivera, Hannah Vito, Angelika Rama, Jordan Lim
31	"Kadena" "Chain"	Will Fredo	Chie Floresca	August 24, 2019	30.6%
Cast: Kiko Estrada, Joanna Ampil, Raymond Bagatsing, CX Navarro, JJ Quilantang, Alyanna Asistio, Karen Timbol, Marilyn Villamayor, Brenna Garcia, Cessa Moncera
32	"Bracelet"	Chiqui Lacsamana	Joan Habana	September 7, 2019	28.0%
Cast: Meryll Soriano, Sharlene San Pedro, Smokey Manaloto, Daisy Cariño, Kathleen Hermosa, William Lorenzo, Myel de Leon, Erika Clemente, Wilbert Ross, Jovani Manansala
33	"Palengke" "Market"	Ian Loreños	Joan Habana	September 14, 2019	29.8%
Cast: Ruby Ruiz, Vance Larena, Boboy Garovillo, Josh de Guzman, Sunshine Garcia, Kat Galang, Junjun Quintana, Manuel Chua, Karl Medina, Rex Lantano
34	"Lipstick"	Myla Ajero	Mae Rose Balanay-Batacan	September 21, 2019	31.8%
Cast: Barbie Imperial, Ina Raymundo, Ashley Sarmiento, Ingrid dela Paz, Simon Ibarra, Cindy Miranda, Markus Paterson, David Chua, Gilleth Sandico, Denise Joaquin, Marco Gallo, Jomari Angeles, Ivan Carpiet, Jason Dewey, Shai Alnajjar
35	"Contest"	Eduardo Roy Jr.	Akeem del Rosario	September 28, 2019	27.2%
The episode centers Idol Philippines winner Zephanie Dimaranan's journey after several losses in singing competitions, including the second season of The Voice Kids, and the defending champion of Tawag ng Tanghalan until overcoming her circumstances to achieve her dreams. Cast: Maris Racal, Dominic Ochoa, Mickey Ferriols, Kristel Fulgar, Yesha Camile, Rhed Bustamante, Allyson McBride
36	"Flyers"	Dwein Baltazar	Dickson Comia	October 5, 2019	25.2%
Cast: Vina Morales, Ronnie Lazaro, Lollie Mara, JB Agustin, John Manalo, Raine Salamante, Brace Arquiza, Mikylla Ramirez, Lui Villaruz, Joel Molina, Ruther Urquia, Ogie Alcasid
37	"Hot Choco"	Andoy Ranay	Joan Habana	October 12, 2019	26.5%
Cast: Elisse Joson, Allan Paule, Joyce Ann Burton, Kyra Custodio, Maru Delgado, Krystle Valentino, Ge Villamil, Richard Gutierrez
38	"Bukid" "Farm"	Thop Nazareno	Mae Rose Balanay-Batacan	October 19, 2019	26.7%
The episode highlights the humble beginnings and struggles of Pinoy Big Brother: Otso's Big Winner Yamyam Gucong. It also centers how he fought for his dream of finishing his studies, despite the poverty he was experiencing. Cast: Yamyam Gucong, Lito Pimentel, Glenda Garcia, Karen Reyes, Xymon Pineda, Juan Miguel Severo, Yong Muhajil, Wealand Ferrer, Banjo Dangalan, Zyren Dela Cruz, Marjorry Lingat
40	"Alkansya" "Piggy Bank"	Ian Loreños	Ruel Montañez	November 2, 2019	25.4%
Cast: Ketchup Eusebio, Soliman Cruz, Dexter Doria, Tess Antonio, Junjun Quintana, Micah Munoz, JJ Quilantang, Miel Espinosa, Eslove Briones, Art Guma
41	"Salamin" "Mirror"	Theodore Boborol	Ruel Montañez	November 9, 2019	24.4%
Cast: Awra Briguela, Rochelle Barrameda, Simon Ibarra, Ynez Veneracion, Fino Herrera, Kenken Nuyad, Lie Reposposa, Jelay Pilones, Mitch Talao, Jaya
42	"Mikropono" "Microphone"	Arden Rod Condez	Akeem del Rosario	November 16, 2019	21.7%
The episode focuses on Tawag ng Tanghalan: Season 3 Grand Finalist Violeta Bayawa's love story as it centers on how Violy and Zach (also known as "Ga") managed to stay in love despite the hardships of being away for so many years, only to be reunited with the help of the singing competition Violy entered. Cast: Ritz Azul, Joseph Marco, Boots Anson-Roa, Dante Rivero, Sharmaine Suarez, Victor Silayan, Cheska Iñigo, Mike Lloren, Claire Ruiz, Heart Ramos, Luke Conde, Angelo Patrimonio, Elora Espano, Jordan Castillo Jr., Arhia Faye Agas
43	"Sunflower"	Kevin Z. Alambra	Akeem del Rosario	November 23, 2019	21.5%
As Gab and Max's relationship became as strong as ever, the latter succumbs into a grave illness. Even then, Gab never fails to prove his undying love to her. Cast: Maymay Entrata, Edward Barber, Yayo Aguila, Pinky Amador, Gerard Pizarras, Franco Laurel, Igiboy Flores, JC Alcantara, Krissha Viaje, Allen Cecilio, Tan Roncal
44	"Colored Pens"	Cathy Camarillo	Ruel Montañez, Joan Habana	November 30, 2019	17.5%
Cast: Julia Barretto, Rita Avila, Ara Mina, Jameson Blake, Jeric Raval, Gillian Vicencio, Carla Martinez, Alexa Macanan, Krystal Mejes, Marc Santiago, Yasmyne Suarez, Missy Quiño, MJ Cayabyab
45	"Pulang Laso" "Red Ribbon"	Eduardo Roy Jr.	Bing Castro Villanueva	December 7, 2019	18.3%
Cast: Kit Thompson, Phoebe Walker, Jean Saburit, Yñigo Delen, Zeus Collins, Richard Quan, Jose Sarasola, Maritess Joaquin, Brenna Garcia, Argel Saycon, Aldrin Angeles, Phil Palmos, Joel Molina, Anne Feo
46	"Palay" "Rice Grain"	FM Reyes	Michael Bryan Transfiguracion	December 21, 2019	20%
Cast: Alessandra de Rossi, Ronnie Lazaro, Allen Dizon, Tanya Gomez, Karen Reyes, Jomari Angeles, CX Navarro, Yesha Camile
47	"Red Roses"	Frasco Mortiz	Mae Rose Balanay-Batacan	December 28, 2019	18.3%
Cast: Jane Oineza, Shamaine Buencamino, Ruby Ruiz, Alma Moreno, Peewee O'Hara, Vin Abrenica, Eva Darren, Tart Carlos, William Lorenzo, Ingrid dela Paz, Patrick Sugui, Angelica Rama, Myel de Leon, Victor Medina, Jess Evardone, Jessica Marco, Nico Gomez, John Vincent Servilla, Mario Capalad
