= Maymay Entrata =

Filipino actress and singer (born 1997)

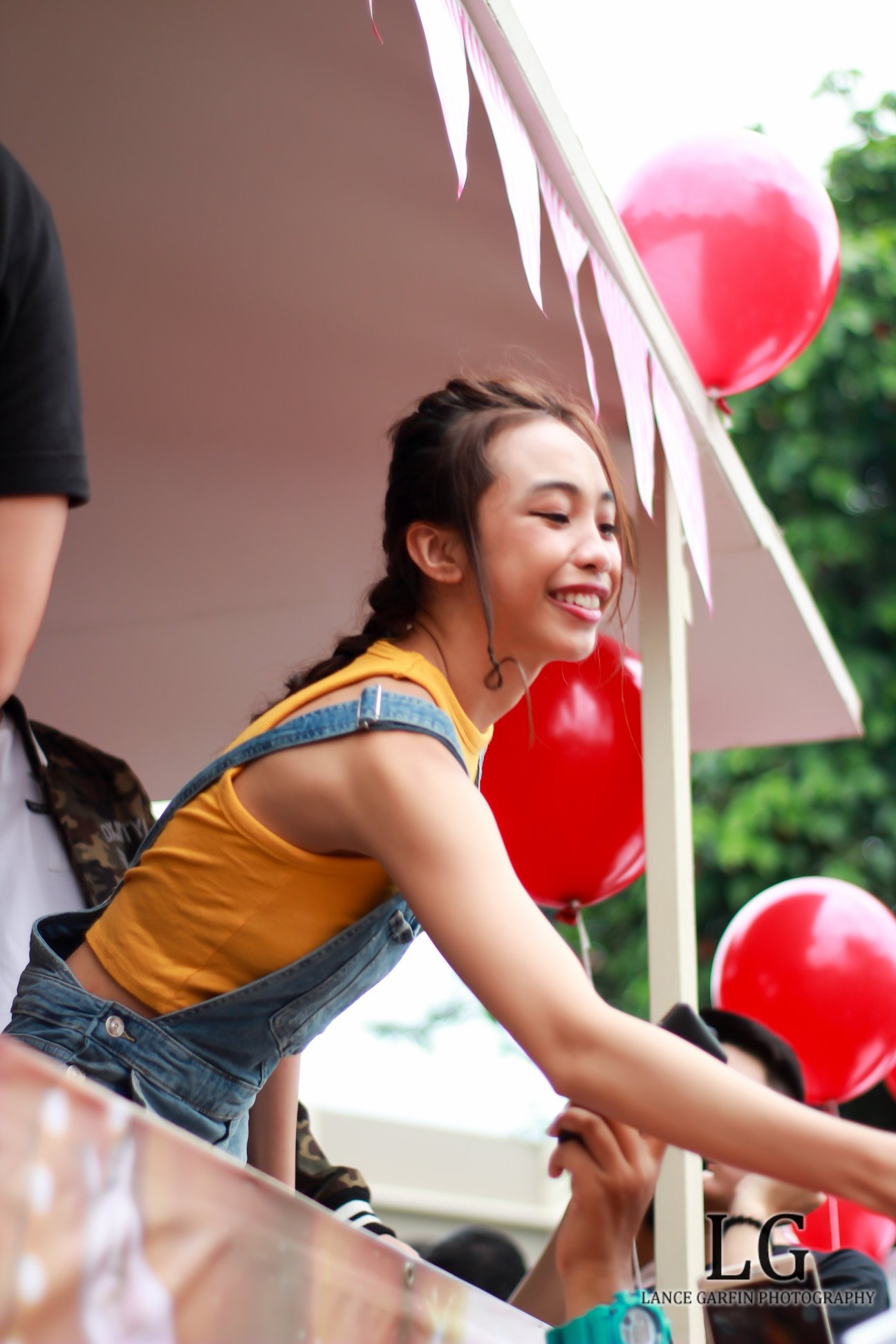
- Entrata in 2018
- Born: Marydale Entrata; May 6, 1997 (age 29); Camiguin, Philippines
- Occupations: Actress; comedian; singer
- Years active: 2016–present
- Musical career
- Origin: Cagayan de Oro, Misamis Oriental, Philippines
- Genres: OPM; pop
- Instrument: Vocals
- Years active: 2016–present
- Labels: Star Music; Star Magic

Marydale "Maymay" Entrata (/ˈmaɪmaɪ ɛnˈtrɑːtɑː/ m(h)y-M(H)Y en-T(H)RAH-tah; born May 6, 1997) is a Filipino actress and singer. Having achieved mainstream success across television, music and fashion, she came to prominence after winning the reality show Pinoy Big Brother: Lucky 7. She is the first Filipina to walk at the Arab Fashion Week. Her accolades include a FAMAS Award, an Awit Award, two PMPC Star Awards for Music and a Box Office Entertainment Awards, in addition to a nomination for an MTV Europe Music Award.

== Early life ==
Marydale Entrata was born on May 6, 1997, in Camiguin, Philippines. She and her older brother, Vincent were raised by their grandparents in Cagayan de Oro after their father left the family when she was one year old, while their mother, Lorna, worked in Japan to support the family. Entrata also has a younger half-brother, Rio, from her mother's family in Japan.

Entrata was a college junior studying technology communication management at the Mindanao University of Science and Technology, but she put her studies on hold when she joined Pinoy Big Brother. In a 2019 interview, she stated that during school, she was more interested in social studies, arts and music, and extracurricular activities like dancing. She noted that Mathematics and English are not her strongest subjects, which influenced her decision to major in English at the collegiate level to improve her language skill.

At the age of 14, Entrata began auditioning for various reality television and talent competitions to pursuit a career in acting. While still in high school, she auditioned for Pinoy Big Brother: Teen Clash 2010 but was not selected. Five years later, she attempted to join the show's sixth season, Pinoy Big Brother: 737 but was again unsuccessful. Entrata also auditioned for other talent competitions. including The Voice and Pilipinas Got Talent, but did not advance in those programs.

== Career ==
After being rejected several times, Entrata almost did not audition for Pinoy Big Brother: Lucky 7 however, when her grandfather Joe got ill, she saw it as a reason to try again. She underwent several auditions before she successfully joined the show. During the show's duration, Entrata's grandfather died due to cardiac arrest and she had to temporarily exit the house to visit his wake in Camiguin. While inside the PBB house, Entrata wrote and recorded the song "Baliw" ("Crazy") which was released by Star Music in different music streaming media. Entrata was later announced as a semi-finalist on the show and had to temporarily exit due to the program's format. Meanwhile, Entrata, together with the other semi-finalists, Edward Barber, and Kisses Delavin, took part in an online reality series called Follow the Lucky 3 Teens, which follows their journey after exiting the house. Entrata went on to win the competition on March 5, 2017, at the Alonte Sports Arena, earning 42.71% of the votes against runners-up Delavin, Yong Muhajil, and Barber.

After winning Pinoy Big Brother, Entrata began her acting career with a lead role in her lifestory episode of the ABS-CBN drama anthology series Maalaala Mo Kaya (MMK). A month after her TV debut, she signed a recording contract with Star Music. In May 2017, Entrata made her film debut in the romantic comedy film Loving in Tandem, in which she played the lead role of a happy-go-lucky girl named Shine, a young woman trying to make ends meet for her family. The film was co-starred by her fellow Pinoy Big Brother contestants Barber, Delavin, and Marco Gallo. Oggs Cruz of Rappler considered the film to be "surprisingly charming" and credited Entrata for her "dignified performance, one that is grounded not in discrepancy but on very relatable appeal". Her performance earned her a nomination for New Movie Actress of the Year at the PMPC Star Awards for Movies.

Following her lead role in Maalaala Mo Kaya, Entrata took on a supporting role at the horror-fantasy drama television series La Luna Sangre—the third installment of Lobo and a sequel to Imortal, starring Kathryn Bernardo and Daniel Padilla. On June 21, 2017, she launched her eponymous debut album at the SM North EDSA SkyDome, selling 2,000 physical copies at the venue alone, and over 7,500 copies on the day of its release. It was later certified gold on June 26, 2017, and platinum, on September 17, 2017, by the Philippine Association of the Record Industry (PARI).

To further expand her musical career, Entrata headlined her The Dream concert on February 23, 2018, at the Kia Theater (now New Frontier), where she was accompanied by Barber, Enchong Dee, and 4th Impact. The concert's success led her to embarked on The Dream Tour to promote her music. She also had other concert appearances, performing in 4th Impact's Rise Up concert at the SkyDome and in with Maja Salvador's MAJA on Stage concert at the Kia Theater. After her tour, Entrata appeared at the horror comedy Da One That Ghost Away, starring Kim Chiu and Ryan Bang. Oggs Cruz considered the film as a "complete and utter mess" and described her character as "blatantly useless". Entrata then played a lead role opposite Barber on a miniseries in the fantasy anthology Wansapanataym, where she played a fake fortune teller named Espie. In November 2018, Entrata was invited by Dubai-based Filipino fashion designer Furne One to audition for the Arab Fashion Week in Dubai. She headlined Amato's fashion label, Amato Couture, making her the first Filipina to do so. Also that year, Entrata began her hosting career in the variety show ASAP when she hosted the program's online counterpart called ASAP Chillout (now iWant ASAP). Her final film of the year was in the fantasy comedy Fantastica.

In 2019, Entrata hosted World of Dance Online along with Riva Quenery, AC Bonifacio, and Georcelle Dapat-Sy. In March 2019, Entrata played an Aeta beauty queen named Judith in another MMK episode, directed by John Lapus. The episode received mixed reviews on social media, mostly on Twitter, with viewers praising Entrata for her performance, to some questioning the lack of diversity in the Philippine entertainment industry for casting non-Aeta actors, and for artificially darkening their skins particularly Entrata's character to appropriate the indigenous group. A month after, she released her second studio album #M0806 for streaming and digital download. She then appeared as Sarah in the drama series Hiwaga ng Kambat starring Barber and Grae Fernandez. Entrata next took a supporting role in Cathy Garcia-Molina's romantic drama Hello, Love, Goodbye where she played an overseas Filipino worker in Hong Kong. Her performance received mixed reviews. Julia Allende of the Philippine Entertainment Portal believed that Entrata, together with Kakai Bautista and Lovely Abella supplied most of the comedic relief and kept things lively throughout the film. Writing for BusinessMirror, Tito Genova Valliente considered their performances as "not only over-the-top, but over any tolerable intelligent decibel". Despite this, the film earned ₱880 million ($17.8 million) worldwide making it the highest-grossing Philippine film at the time of its release. She ended the year by starring on another MMK episode, playing Maxine Blanco, a bone cancer patient who went viral when her boyfriend posted their love story on Facebook.

In January 2021, Entrata starred in the romantic comedy Princess DayaReese portraying both a con artist and a princess, who temporarily switched roles.

== Personal life ==
On Easter Sunday, 2024, Entrata underwent water baptism. She also confirmed her break-up with her non-showbiz boyfriend, Aaron Haskell, since 2022. In 2025, she announced her relationship with Filipino-American commercial model and rookie actor Joaquin Enriquez.

== Filmography ==
=== Film ===
Year	Title	Role	Note	Ref.
2017	Loving in Tandem	Sunshine "Shine" Camantigue	Main role	
2018	Da One That Ghost Away	Serrah Monseratt	Supporting role	
2018	Fantastica	Princess Maulan	Supporting role, Official MMFF 2018 entry	
2019	Hello, Love, Goodbye	Mary Dale Fabregas	Supporting role	
2021	Princess DayaReese	Princess Ulap/Reese	Main role	
2024	Hello, Love, Again	Mary Dale Fabregas	Special participation	

=== Television ===
Year	Title	Role	Notes	Ref.
2016–2017	Pinoy Big Brother: Lucky 7	Herself	Contestant	
2017–2018	La Luna Sangre	Apple Toralba		
2017, 2019	Maalaala Mo Kaya	Herself	Episodes: "Bahay"	
2017, 2019	Maalaala Mo Kaya	Judith Manap	Episode: "600 Pesos"	
2017, 2019	Maalaala Mo Kaya	Maxine Blanco	Episode: "Sunflower"	
2018	Wansapanataym	Espie	Episode: "Ikaw Ang GHOSTo Ko"; 10 episodes	
2018	ASAP TLC (True Love Connection)	Sandra Entroso	Television special	
2019	Hiwaga ng Kambat	Sarah Pamintuan		
2021	Click, Like, Share	Beng	Episode: "Lurker"	
2023	Dream Maker: Search for the Next Global Pop Group	Herself	Filipino Guest Mentor	
2025	Happy Crush	Carla		
2025–2026	Roja	Luna Javier		
2026	Come Dine With Me: Celebrity Philippines	Herself	Host	

=== Digital ===
Year	Title	Role	Ref.
2017	Follow the Lucky Three Teens	Herself	
2017	Squad Goals	Herself	
2018	One Music POPSSSS	Herself	
2018	ASAP Chillout	Herself (host)	
2018	Alamat Ng Ano: Nura and Velma	Nura	
2018–present	iWant ASAP	Herself (host)	
2019	World of Dance Online	Herself (host)	
2020	The Four Bad Boys and Me	DJ Zari	

== Bibliography ==
Year	Title	Role	Publishing House	Ref.
2017	He's My Oppastar!	Macy	ABS-CBN Publishing	
2018	Lost Souls	Herself	ABS-CBN Publishing	

== Discography ==
=== Albums ===
Title	Album details	Tracks	Certifications
Maymay	Released: June 21, 2017; Label: Star Music; Formats: CD, Digital download, streaming	1. Toinks; 2. Shanawa (Sana S'ya); 3. Kabaduyan; 4. Mahal Kita Kasi; 5. Mahal Kita Kasi (ft. Edward Barber); 6. Pangarap; 7. Baliw - Punk Version (ft. Edward Barber); 8. Baliw - Acoustic Version (ft. Edward Barber); 9. Titig ng Pag-ibig (ft. Edward Barber & McLisse)	Platinum; Gold
#M0806	Released: April 28, 2019; Label: Star Music; Formats: Digital download, streaming	1. Abakada; 2. Ikaw Na Lang Sana; 3. Heart, Heart Girl; 4. Kakayanin Kaya; 5. Ilang Ulit Pa Ba; 6. Magdamag (ft. Edward Barber); 7. Abakada - Minus One; 8. Ikaw Na Lang Sana - Minus One; 9. Heart, Heart Girl - Minus One; 10. Kakayanin Kaya - Minus One; 11. Ilang Ulit Pa Ba - Minus One; 12. Magdamag	
MPOWERED	Released: November 19, 2021; Label: Star Music; Formats: Digital download, streaming	1. AMAKABOGERA; 2. Gising Na; 3. Naniniwala Ako; 4. Ubos Na ang Problema; 5. Huling Hugot; 6. 'Di Kawalan; 7. AMAKABOGERA (Tropical Remix)	

=== Singles ===
Title	Year	Album
"Baliw" (with Edward Barber)	2016	Maymay
"Titig ng Pag-ibig" (with Edward Barber, Elisse Joson, and McCoy de Leon)	2017	Maymay
"Toinks"	2017	Maymay
"Shanawa (Sana S'ya)"	2017	Maymay
"Merry ang Pasko"	2017	Non-album single
"Kabaduyan"	2017	Maymay
"Bituin"	2018	Non-album single
"Kakayanin Kaya"	2019	#M0806
"I Love You 2"	2020	Non-album single
"Di Kawalan"	2021	MPowered
"Amakabogera"	2021	MPowered
"Puede Ba"	2022	Non-album single
"Autodeadma" (featuring Wooseok and solo version)	2023	Non-album single
"Tsada Mahigugma"	2023	Non-album single
"Amakabogera (English version)"	2024	Non-album single
"Ikaw ang Kumpleto ng Pasko	2024	Non-album single
"Paradise"	2025	Non-album single
"Nasaan ang Hiling"	2025	Non-album single
"Masunog Man"	2026	
"What We Love"	2026	

== Awards and nominations ==
Award	Year (Note: Indicates the year of ceremony. Each year is linked to the article about the awards held that year, wherever possible.)	Recipient(s) and nominee(s)	Category (Note: Awards in certain categories do not have prior nominations and only winners are announced by the jury. For simplification and to avoid errors, each award in this list has been presumed to have had a prior nomination.)	Result	Ref.
ASAP Pop Teen Choice	2016	Maymay Entrata (Note: shared with Edward Barber)	Best Pop Love Teens	Won	
ASAP Pop Teen Choice	2017	Maymay Entrata	Best Pop Love Teens	Won	
Awit Awards	2018	"Toinks"	Best Novelty Recording	Nominated	
Awit Awards	2020	"Magdamag"	Best Dance Recording	Nominated	
Awit Awards	2022	Maymay Entrata	Favorite Female Artist	Won	
Awit Awards	2022	"Amakabogera"	Best Dance Recording	Nominated	
Awit Awards	2022	"Amakabogera"	Best Music Video	Nominated	
Awit Awards	2022	"Amakabogera"	Favorite Song	Nominated	
ComGuild Academe's Choice Awards	2018	Maymay Entrata	Advertisers' Most Admired Love Team	Won	
Eduk Circle Awards	2017	Maymay Entrata	Best Novelty Singer of the Year	Won	
Eduk Circle Awards	2017	Maymay Entrata	Best Female Music Artist	Nominated	
Eduk Circle Awards	2019	Maalaala Mo Kaya (Note: Episode: "600 Pesos")	Best Actress in a Single Drama Performance	Nominated	
FAMAS Award	2019	Maymay Entrata	German Moreno Youth Award	Won	
Guillermo Mendoza Box Office Awards	2019	Maymay Entrata	Most Promising Loveteam for Movies	Won	
MOR Pinoy Music Awards	2017	Maymay Entrata	Best New Artist	Nominated	
MOR Pinoy Music Awards	2017	"Baliw"	Best Collaboration	Won	
MOR Pinoy Music Awards	2018	"Baliw"	Female Artist of the Year	Nominated	
MOR Pinoy Music Awards	2018	"Shanawa - Sana S'ya"	Song of the Year	Won	
MOR Pinoy Music Awards	2019	"Bituin"	LSS Hit of the Year	Won	
MTV Europe Music Awards	2022	Maymay Entrata	Best Asia Act	Nominated	
Myx Music Awards	2018	Maymay Entrata	Myx Celebrity VJ of the Year	Nominated	
Myx Music Awards	2020	"Kakayanin Kaya"	Mellow Video of the Year	Nominated	
PMPC Star Awards for Movies	2018	Loving in Tandem	New Movie Actress of the Year	Nominated	
PMPC Star Awards for Movies	2019	Fantastica	Movie Love Team of the Year	Nominated	
PMPC Star Awards for Music	2018	Maymay Entrata	New Female Recording Artist	Nominated	
PMPC Star Awards for Music	2022	Maymay Entrata	Female Pop Artist of the Year	Nominated	
PMPC Star Awards for Television	2017	Maalaala Mo Kaya (Note: Episode: "Bahay")	Best New Female TV Personality	Nominated	
PMPC Star Awards for Television	2019	Maymay Entrata	German Moreno Power Tandem Award	Won	
Push Awards	2017	Maymay Entrata	Push Newcomer	Nominated	
Push Awards	2017	Maymay Entrata	Push Group/Tandem of the Year	Won	
Push Awards	2019	Maymay Entrata	Push Group/Tandem of the Year	Won	
Push Awards	2019	Loving in Tandem	Push Female Movie Performance of the Year	Won	
Push Awards	2019	Maymay Entrata	Push Celebrity Style Inspo of the Year	Won	
Push Awards	2020	Maymay Entrata	Push #OOTD Goals	Won	
Push Awards	2020	Maalaala Mo Kaya (Note: Episode: "Busilak na Korona")	Push Female TV Performance of the Year	Won	
Push Awards	2020	Maymay Entrata	Push Young Love of the Year	Won	
Push Awards	2020	Maymay Entrata	Female Celebrity of the Year	Won	
RTU Kidlat Sinaya Awards	2019	Maymay Entrata	Female Celebrity Endorser of the Year	Won	
RTU Kidlat Sinaya Awards	2019	Maymay Entrata	Loveteam of the Year	Won	
Star Cinema Awards	2017	Maymay Entrata	ReelxReal Fashion Icon	Won	
Star Cinema Awards	2017	Maymay Entrata	Ultimate Fresh Female Face	Won	
Star Cinema Awards	2017	Maymay Entrata	Ultimate Recording Artist	Nominated	
Star Cinema Awards	2017	Maymay Entrata	Ultimate Love Out Loud Pair	Won	
Star Cinema Awards	2017	Maymay Entrata	Ultimate Breakthrough Love Team	Nominated	
Wish Music Awards	2023	"Amakabogera"	Wishclusive Pop Performance of the Year	Nominated	

== Tours ==
- The Dream Tour: Maymay in Concert (2018)

Preceded by (Japan) Miho Nishida and Jimboy Martin	Pinoy Big Brother; Big Winner; 2017	Succeeded by Yamyam Gucong
Preceded by Jimboy Martin	Pinoy Big Brother; Teen Big Winner; 2017	Succeeded by Fyang
