= List of Hiwaga ng Kambat episodes =

Hiwaga ng Kambat (lit. 'Mystery of the Twin Bat') is a 2019 Philippine drama television series starring Edward Barber and Grae Fernandez. The series premiered on ABS-CBN's Yes! Weekend from April 21 to August 25, 2019, succeeding the two-decade run of Wansapanataym.

== Series overview ==
Season	Episodes	Originally released	
Season	Episodes	First released	Last released
1	19	April 21, 2019	August 25, 2019

== Episodes ==
=== Season 1 (2019) ===
No. overall	No. in season	Title	Original release date	Kantar Media Ratings (nationwide)
1	1	"Pagsilang"	April 21, 2019	24.4%
2	2	"Paghaharap"	April 28, 2019	22.7%
3	3	"Hinamon"	May 5, 2019	21.4%
4	4	"Pagtatapat"	May 12, 2019	21.9%
5	5	"Plano"	May 19, 2019	21.9%
6	6	"Hadlang"	May 26, 2019	22.2%
7	7	"Panganib"	June 2, 2019	23.2%
8	8	"Tagapagligtas"	June 9, 2019	17.9%
9	9	"Hinala"	June 16, 2019	22.4%
10	10	"Pag-iwas"	June 23, 2019	23.8%
11	11	"Katotohanan"	June 30, 2019	24.1%
12	12	"Pagtutuos"	July 7, 2019	21.9%
13	13	"Paniningil"	July 14, 2019	23.7%
14	14	"Pakana"	July 21, 2019	24.3%
15	15	"Paglantad"	July 28, 2019	24.7%
16	16	"Bihag"	August 4, 2019	25.5%
17	17	"Rebelasyon"	August 11, 2019	30.4%
18	18	"Kabayaran"	August 18, 2019	32.5%
19	19	"Pagpapatawad"	August 25, 2019	33.9%
