= Maalaala Mo Kaya season 28 =

Maalaala Mo Kaya
- Season 28
- Starring: Charo Santos
- No. of episodes: 14 (excluding re-runs)

Release
- Original network: ABS-CBN (Until the network shutdown); Kapamilya Channel/A2Z (replacing ABS-CBN, ad interim)
- Original release: January 4 – December 26, 2020

Season chronology
- ← Previous; Season 27 Next → Season 29

Maalaala Mo Kaya (transl. Would you remember?; abbreviated MMK), also known as Memories in English, is a Philippine anthology series, which was first aired on May 15, 1991. MMK is the longest-running drama anthology on Philippine television. From March to November, re-runs of previous episodes are being aired due to the Community Quarantines halting their productions. Also, for the entire month of May and the first week of June, no episodes were aired due to the network's shut down. As of December 5, new episodes were shown for the first time since nine months of production hiatus due to pandemic.

== Episodes ==
#	Episode title	Directed by	Written by	Original air date	Ratings
1	"Mata" "Eyes"	Arden Rod Condez	Bing Castro Villanueva	January 4, 2020	17.8%
Cast: McCoy de Leon, Raymond Bagatsing, JB Agustin, Andrea del Rosario, Marco Masa, Jansen Magpusao, Kaori Oinuma, Royce Cabrera, Karla Pambid, Janice de Belen
2	"Basketball Court"	Denise O'Hara	Dickson Comia	January 11, 2020	23.1%
Cast: Heaven Peralejo, Joshua Colet, Matet de Leon, Michael Flores, Sunshine Garcia, Joj Agpangan, Ashley Sarmiento, Marc Santiago, Josh de Guzman, Adrian Lindayag, Jenny Colet
3	"Medal"	Elfren Vibar	Akeem del Rosario	January 18, 2020	20.8%
Inspired by her father, Nesthy chases her dream of becoming a great boxer. Despite being told by her rude relatives, that boxing is just for boys, she carries on. Just as she is flourishing in the Philippine Women's Boxing National Team, she finds herself struggling. Problems befall her family, causing her mental toughness to deteriorate. Thus, the athlete suffers a crippling setback, but takes it as an opportunity to grow and improve in boxing. Rising above the pain and her failures, Nesthy continues to strive hard to fulfill her dreams for herself and her family . In addition, she shows the intention to prove that women can succeed in this by men dominated sports too. Cast: Bembol Roco, Maureen Mauricio, Jana Agoncillo, Mara Lopez, Kokoy de Santos, Michael Roy Jornales, Kiara Takahashi, Zeppi Borromeo, Kyzha Villalino, Gian Wang, Jane de Leon
4	"Kotse" "Cars"	Frasco Mortiz	Mae Rose Balanay-Batacan	February 1, 2020	20.8%
Cast: Teresa Loyzaga, Markus Paterson, Lovely Rivero, Jong Cuenco, Eda Nolan, Aiko Climaco, Marc Acueza, Eslove Briones, Rubi Rubi, Marlon Mance, Yen Quirante, Thea Rizalde, Jelay Pilones, Elyson de Dios, Johnron Macapagal, Rex Lantano
5	"Kawayan" "Bamboo"	Nuel C. Naval	Joan Habana	February 8, 2020	25.1%
Cast: Louise Abuel, Joem Bascon, Nikki Valdez, Mon Confiado, Sue Prado, Yñigo Delen, Justin James Quilantang, Mary Joy Apostol, Gillian Vicencio, Izzy Canillo, Pepe Herrera, Paolo Rivero, CX Navarro, Amy Nobleza, Victor Medina, Elora Espano, Lance Lucido, Ge Villamil, Acey Aguilar, John Vincent Servilla, Bon Lentejas
6	"Posas" "Shackled"	Elfren Vibar	Akeem del Rosario	February 15, 2020	26%
In 2008, Karen (Santos) is single, hopeless and apparently being in love. When she got a job in Nueva Ecija, she dated three men. She always insisted on the relationship, but felt mistreated and failed several times. A year later, despite being heartless because of the bitterness in life, she returned into her mother's nest. Hired as a Social Worker in Municipal Welfare and Development, she met Jason (Pineda) working as a policeman. Creating a false reality for her, by telling her that he is giving her true romance and to heal her broken heart, it ends in a mixture of emotions. "Will their relationship become a true bliss?" describes the point of departure. Cast: Yen Santos, Enzo Pineda, Tetchie Agbayani, Soliman Cruz, Yayo Aguila, Neil Coleta, Tess Antonio, Alora Sasam, Vance Larena, Royce Cabrera, Miho Nishida, Krissha Viaje, Mayton Eugenio, Jimi Marquez
7	"Tren" "Rails"	Cathy Camarillo	Michael Bryan Transfiguracion	February 22, 2020	27.2%
In her amusement, Aira (Salvador) enters a university for her profound passion, dancing. Within many ups and downs occurring, she joins a cheer dancing club, in which she gets to know Jason (Garcia). Although they show character potential for each other, they soon estrange. They met until they were separated as lovers of others. She likes to hip-hop and, most of all, swing dance. She also practiced gymnastics once by memorizing the ballroom dance. This brought her a scholarship for the next semester, so that good vibes harvested on their personal and future goals. After three years, she shifted her profession as a teacher on a "on-the-job-teaching period". It eagerly scattered the hope in their relationship. A lot of positive and negative events happen with focus on friendships. Cast: Janella Salvador, Joshua Garcia, Ina Raymundo, Bernadette Allyson, Jin Macapagal, Gerard Pizzaras, Lander Vera-Perez, Jef Gaitan, CJ Jaravata, Arkie Poblete, Shoichi Oka, Kim Franco, Tan Roncal, Lance Justin Carr, Ashley Colet, Yasmyne Suarez
8	"Mural"	Barry Gonzalez	Dickson Comia	February 29, 2020	25.1%
Murlaist Jerry Gabo (Lucero/Masa) was addicted to playing Basketball in her childhood and until an accident occurred. He then moved on to doing art which led to a professional curiosity and planning of painting a huge mural of his idols Michael Jordan and Kobe Bryant. Despite that, he is a Pastor on a Christian Ministry in Legazpi City and married Sheryl (de Belen). She is a ghastly wife which makes his life a difficulty. She is having an greedily inapt affair, so that he is illegally dating a woman (Garcia) which he met during his motorcycle trip in Iloilo twelve years ago. They got desperately separated leaving them with an empty soul. Many accusations arose in his life, but he decided to face it by painting, trying to forget his previous and serious thoughts about his property and family. He is making a final return and apologizes to Sheryl, that frankly managed to be accepted. Cast: Sid Lucero, Sunshine Garcia, Johnny Revilla, Tanya Gomez, Ryle Santiago, Marco Masa, Xymon Pineda, Brace Arquiza, Criza Taa, Melissa Jimenez, Rommel Velasquez, Jessica Marco, Gelli de Belen
9	"Ilog" "River"	Ian Loreños	Bing Castro Villanueva	March 7, 2020	23.7%
30 years ago, Ferdinand Plazo (Villanueva/Madrid) whom he met Elvira (Morales/Esclito) will full affection of two hearts that only shattering her life onto her stricted parents namely for her uncle (Quizon) and mainly for her mother (Delgado), she offended by whom rejected by affair. But in which boundaries and out distance for success, ten years later the first child born (Fedelin) followed by another one (Bautista) born both men diagnosed with severe mental disorders in which the pregnant woman have a dynasty from the first birth. Then followed by a third child in which he is too shy but felted anxious to tease everyone for his characteristics, Elvira encouraged to Ferdi that he had feel happy and proud for the forth and last child born normal both females. but in occurrence that due to heavy risk that Elvira's Mother cursed that they will suffer at heavy risk, by that the couples simplified their skills and abilities to whom in future. How will let the married life afflicted to turmoil to themselves? Cast: Cris Villanueva, Vina Morales, Epi Quizon, Marissa Delgado, Seth Fedelin, Harvey Bautista, Uno Madrid, JC Alcantara, Vivoree Esclito, Gileth Sandico, Josh de Guzman, Erika Clemente
10	"Tattoo"	Sonny Calvento	Mae Rose Balanay	March 14, 2020	N/A
Cast: RK Bagatsing, Empress, Malou de Guzman, Ynigo Delen, Efren Reyes, Zeppi Borromeo, Lui Villaruz, Eric Nicolas, Veighda Inoval, Hannah Vito, Jojo Abellana, Eslove Briones, Kyle Banzon, Anne Feo
11	"Stethoscope"	Dado Lumibao	Mary Rose Colindres and Arah Jell Badayos	November 28, 2020	N/A
Cast: Arjo Atayde, Sylvia Sanchez, Jane de Leon, Rommel Padilla, Hero Angeles, Aldrin Angeles
12	"Bracelet"	Dado Lumibao	Mary Rose Colindres and Arah Jell Badayos	December 5, 2020	N/A
El and Lerma forge a loving relationship while pursuing their dreams as doctors. Despite struggling with their toxic schedule in the hospital, the couple still manages to find time for each other without forgetting their duties to their patients. However, a challenging situation soon forces them to face the harsh reality of their responsibilities in the medical field. Cast: Arjo Atayde, Jane de Leon, Sylvia Sanchez, Rommel Padilla, Hero Angeles, Aldrin Angeles
13	"Notebook"	Nuvel C. Naval	Jaymar Castro	December 12, 2020	N/A
Arnel was an ambiguous man, he pursuing his dreams on writing all of his ambiguous memory for his future as a Seaman, however distractions ahead in scribbled his illness for fortune. Will he achieve his goals to pursue an attracted light? Cast: Joshua Garcia, Nonie Buencamino, Shamaine Buencamino, Dexter Doria, Yñigo Delen
14	"Pancit"	Dado Lumibao	Jaymar Castro	December 19, 2020	N/A
Growing up away from her siblings after their parents ended their marriage, Kristine tries to fulfill her promise to her departed mother (Karla Pambid) that she will eventually be reunited with her loved ones. Setting up a Christmas reunion fund every year, she takes it upon herself to work hard in hopes of providing a better future for her siblings. However, the distance between them soon takes a toll as the responsibilities piling up on Kristine's shoulders seem too much for her to bear, leaving her siblings feeling like a burden to their eldest sister. Meanwhile, their father Pablo (Nor Domingo) returns to the picture in his attempt to repair their broken family. Cast: Kim Chiu, Mary Joy Apostol, Celine Lim, Anthony Jennings, Bea Basa, Karla Pambid, Nor Domingo, Zeppi Borromeo
