= Princess DayaReese =

2021 Filipino film by Barry Gonzalez

- Official release poster
- Directed by: Barry Gonzalez
- Screenplay by: Kristine C. Gabriel; Carmel T. Jacomelle
- Produced by: Kara U. Kintanar; Carmi G. Raymundo
- Starring: Maymay Entrata; Edward Barber
- Cinematography: Ab Garcia
- Edited by: Noah Tonga
- Music by: Emerzon Texon
- Production company: Star Cinema
- Distributed by: iWantTFC; KTX
- Release date: January 1, 2021
- Running time: 115 minutes
- Country: Philippines
- Language: Filipino

Princess DayaReese (stylized as Princess 'Daya' Reese) is a 2021 Philippine romantic comedy film starring Maymay Entrata and Edward Barber, directed by Barry Gonzalez. The film was released under Star Cinema and premiered on January 1, 2021, on KTX and iWantTFC, and on pay per view channels on Sky Cable and Cignal as well in selected cinemas. The film's title is a play on the 2001 film The Princess Diaries.

== Plot ==
Reese (Maymay Entrata), a poor girl who only wants a happy ending was lured by the guarantee of cash, consents to pretend to be a princess of a kingdom so the real princess who looks like her can finally run away.

== Cast ==
Main

- Maymay Entrata as Princess Diana Reese "Reese" Termulo / Princess Ulap
- Edward Barber as Caleb "Cal" Abdon

Supporting

- Snooky Serna as Tita Sharon Termulo
- Neil Coleta as Denden Termulo
- Jeffrey Quizon as King Amala
- Pepe Herrera as Weda
- Chie Filomeno as Diwa
- Alora Sasam as Nini
- Iggy Boy Flores as Pak
- CJ Salonga as Sherlock Termulo
- Gold Azeron as Eliver Termulo
- Michael Flores as Governor Martin Abdon
- Issa Litton as Lisa Abdon

== Release ==
The film was premiered on January 1, 2021, directed by Barry Gonzalez. This serves as the second collaboration of Maymay Entrata, Edward Barber, and the director after the 2018 film Fantastica. The poster was posted via Instagram by the two main actors Maymay and Edward on December 17, 2020. The Official trailer was dropped on December 19, 2020.

The film was due to be released in August 2020 but was postponed and is now set to premiere in January 2021.
