= Fantasy World (theme park) =

Unfinished theme park in the Philippines

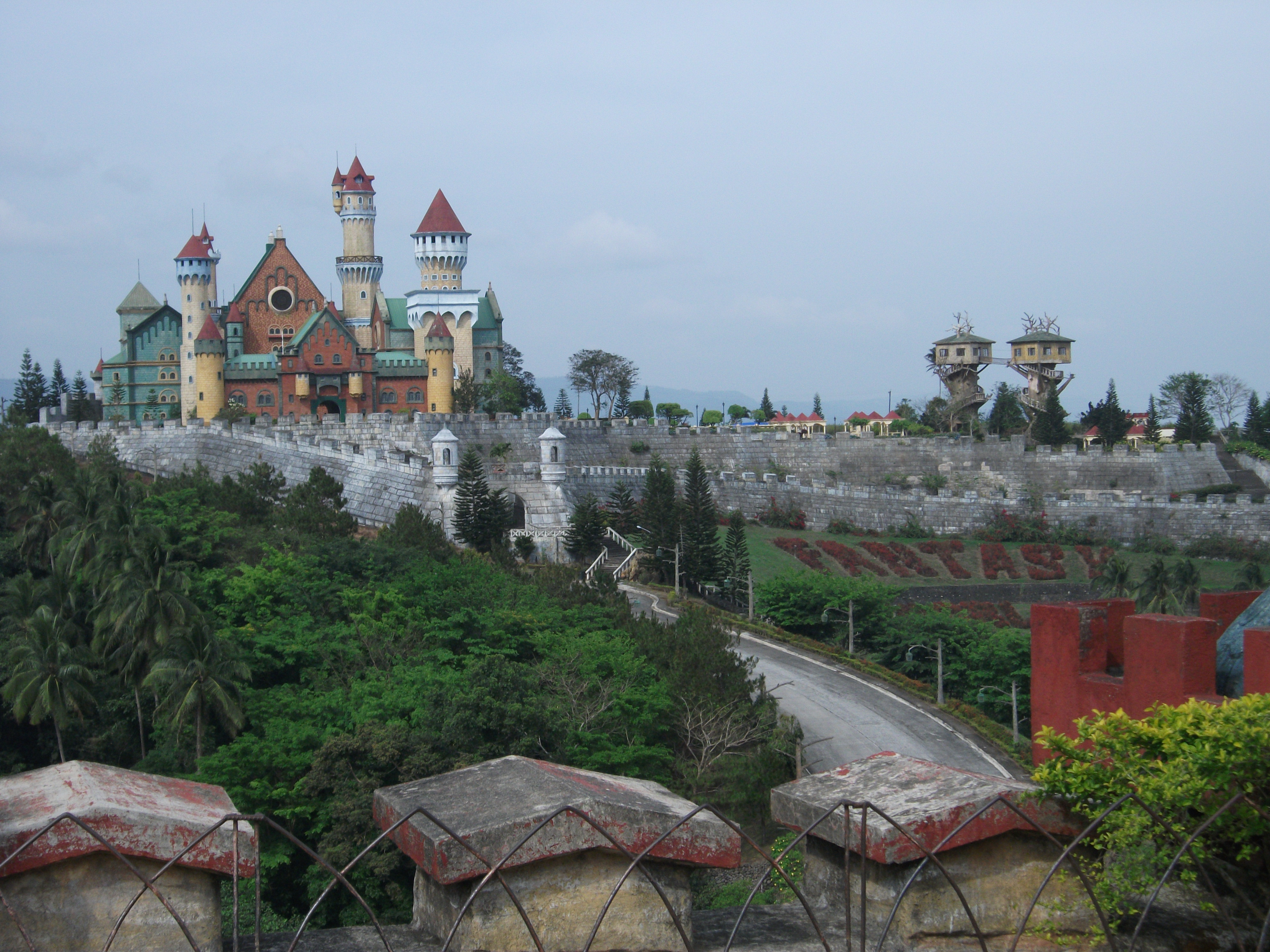
- Interactive map of Fantasy World
- Coordinates: 14°00′56.7″N 120°52′24.9″E
- Owner: ECE Realty & Development Inc.
- Theme: Fantasy medieval
- Area: 195 ha (480 acres) — planned
- Theme park never operated as intended.

Fantasy World is an unfinished theme park in Lemery, Batangas, Philippines. With no operational rides, the site functions as a photo park.

== History ==
Fantasy World was initially intended to be a members-only club but was changed into a resort-theme park open to tourists coming from Metro Manila and Calabarzon. It received an endorsement from the Department of Tourism in 1997. Land acquisition started in January 1999 while site development began in October with ECE Realty & Development Inc. as the project's initial developer. In 2001, it was granted pioneer incentives by the Board of Investments.

It was touted to be the "Disney World of the Philippines" and was envisioned to dwarf Enchanted Kingdom. The project was expected to cost ₱17 billion and was to be fully operational by 2005. However, due to financial issues and illness of ECE Realty head Emilio Ching, development of Fantasy World halted in the mid-2000s.

Fantasy World was then open to the public in the early 2010s as a site for photoshoots. The site then was bought by new owners.

== Facilities ==
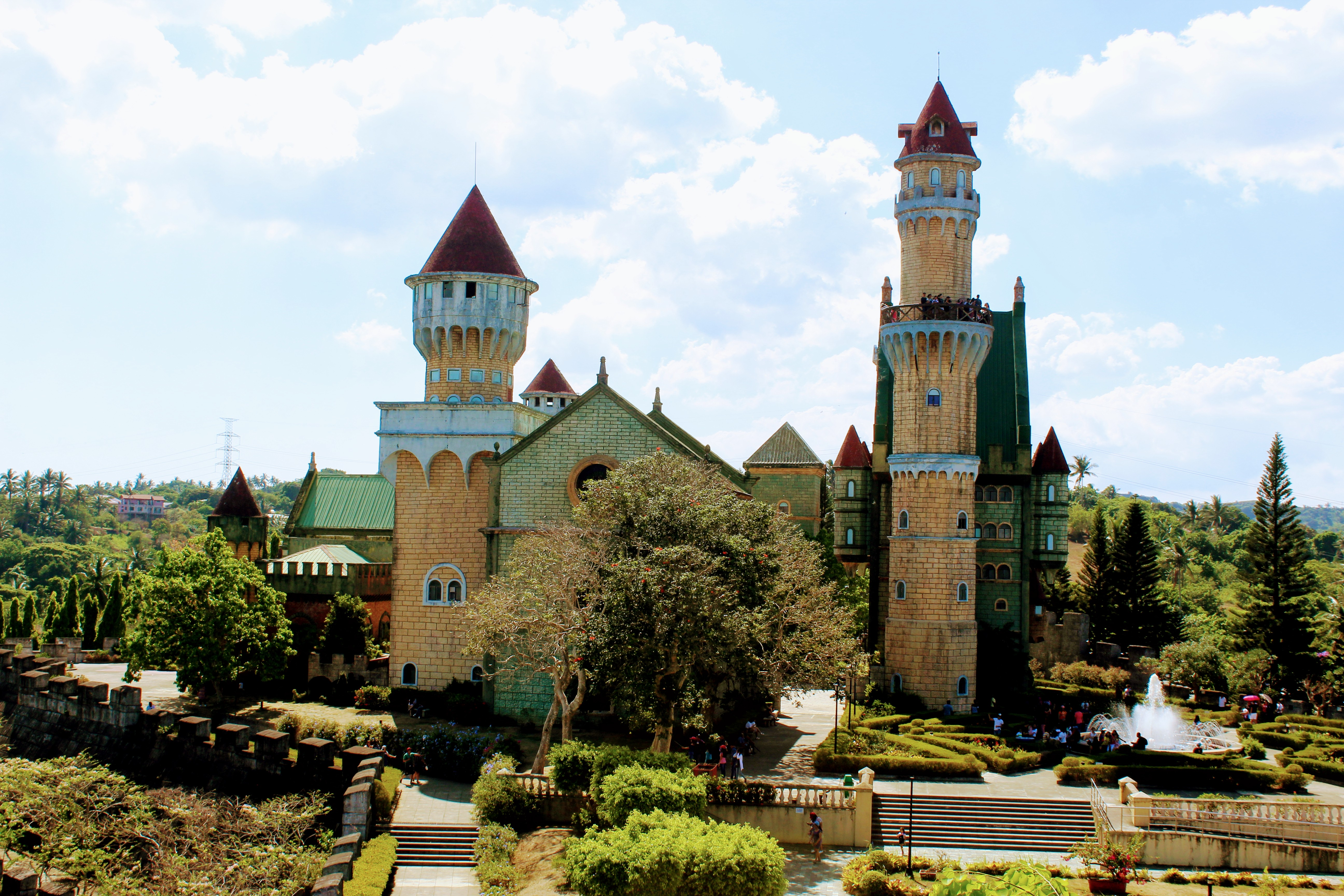
Fantasy World castle in 2019

Fantasy World is a medieval theme park which was projected to cover an area of 195 ha (480 acres) if completed. This includes the 85-hectare (210-acre) main area of the theme park, a 35-hectare (86-acre) water park, a 45-hectare (110-acre) golf course and a 30-hectare (74-acre) country club and resort. The existing developed includes non-functional rides. A Bavarian-inspired castle serves as the centerpiece of Fantasy World. The planned hotel was to have 504 rooms.

== In popular culture ==
ABS-CBN's fantasy anthology series Wansapanataym was filmed at Fantasy World for the episodes "Sine-World" and "Rapunzel".

GMA's 2006 television series Majika was filmed at Fantasy World. Likewise, some scenes of Fantastica of Star Cinema and Viva Films were shot at the theme park.
