= Hiwaga ng Kambat =

2019 Philippine drama television series

- Title card
- Genre: Drama; Horror; Fantasy
- Created by: Carlina dela Merced; Manny Palo; Reggie Amigo; Mariami Tanangco-Domingo; Allan Cuadra; Philip Joshua Endrinal; Hazel Parfan
- Written by: Mari Lamasan; Clarissa Estuar-Navarro; Mariami Tanangco-Domingo; Raymond Diamzon
- Directed by: Onat A. Diaz; Jerome C. Pobocan
- Creative director: Rondel P. Lindayag
- Starring: Edward Barber; Grae Fernandez
- Music by: Francis S. Concio
- Country of origin: Philippines
- Original language: Filipino
- No. of episodes: 19 (list of episodes)

Production
- Executive producers: Carlo Katigbak; Cory Vidanes; Laurenti Dyogi; Roldeo Endrinal
- Producers: Julie Anne R. Benitez; Brenda Lee E. Estocapio
- Production location: Philippines
- Editor: Mark Segubience
- Production companies: Dreamscape Entertainment Television; Cinemedia

Original release
- Network: ABS-CBN
- Release: April 21 – August 25, 2019

Hiwaga ng Kambat (lit. 'mystery of the twin bat') is a 2019 Philippine television drama horror series broadcast by ABS-CBN. Directed by Onat A. Diaz and Jerome C. Pobocan, it stars Edward Barber and Grae Fernandez. It aired on the network's Yes Weekend! line up and worldwide on TFC from April 21 to August 25, 2019, replacing Wansapanataym and was replaced by Parasite Island.

== Synopsis ==
A twin was born in a partner who was cursed so that their child will turn into bats. The curse came true, as baby Twins were born. One looks normal, but inherited the hot-blooded and impatience traits of a bat, another looks literally a bat, complete with blind eyes and strong sonar and enhanced hearing. The bat-shaped baby was abandoned in a farming town, while keeping the human baby. Many years later, the twins grew differently. Iking being kind to his family, despite being cursed to transform into a bat on night. While Mateo inherited his father's vile attitude, matching his impatience and hot-bloodedness. Their fates and rivalry got intertwined when Iking goes to Mateo's school.

== Cast ==
=== Main cast ===
- Edward Barber as Michael E. Baron / Francisco "Iking" Castro
- Grae Fernandez as Mateo E. Baron

=== Supporting cast ===
- Maymay Entrata as Sarah Pamintuan
- Chanty as Loraine Maniquis
- Sunshine Cruz as Melissa Enriquez-Baron
- Epy Quizon as Zandro Baron
- Malou de Guzman as Epifania "Panying" Castro
- Johnny Revilla as Jaime Enriquez
- Michael Rivero as Tomas Pamintuan
- Rubi Rubi as Delia Pamintuan
- Antonette Garcia as Oryang
- Manuel Chua as Berting

=== Guest cast ===
- JJ Quilantang as young Iking
- Robert "Robbie" Wachtel as young Mateo
- Lawrence Roxas as Dodong
- Che Ramos as Doc Pia Maniquis

== Rerun ==
The show re-aired on Jeepney TV from October 31, 2020 to March 6, 2021. The show also re-aired on Kapamilya Channel from August 7 to December 18, 2021, replacing the reruns of Parasite Island and was replaced by Uncoupling. The show re-aired again on Jeepney TV (also on ALLTV) from August 30 to November 2, 2025 as Wansapanatym.

== Reception ==
Kantar Media National TV Ratings (6:45PM and 7:00PM PST)
Pilot Episode	Finale Episode	Peak	Average
24.4% April 21, 2019	33.9% August 25, 2019	33.9% August 25, 2019	24.3%

== See also ==
- List of programs broadcast by ABS-CBN
- List of ABS-CBN Studios original drama series
