= Di Ko Lang Masabi =

Single by Kisses Delavin

from the album Kisses
- Language: Tagalog
- English title: I Just Can't Say
- Released: October 6, 2017
- Recorded: 2017
- Genre: Pop
- Length: 2:52
- Label: Star Music
- Songwriter: Hazel Faith dela Cruz
- Producer: Roque "Rox" Santos

Lyric video
- "Di Ko Lang Masabi" on YouTube

"Di Ko Lang Masabi" (English: "I Just Can't Say") is the debut single of actress, beauty queen and Pinoy Big Brother: Lucky 7 2nd lucky big placer, Kisses Delavin. The song was first heard in MOR 101.9 on October 4, 2017 but the single was officially released two days later. The song was under Star Records label will be part of Delavin's first self-titled album.

== Track listing ==
Digital download
| No. | Title | Length |
|---|---|---|
| 1. | "Di Ko Lang Masabi" | 2:52 |
