= Da One That Ghost Away =

2018 Filipino horror comedy film

DOTGA: Da One That Ghost Away
- Theatrical movie poster
- Directed by: Tony Y. Reyes
- Written by: Danno Christopher C. Mariquit; Daisy G. Cayanan; Dip B. Mariposque
- Starring: Ryan Bang; Kim Chiu; Enzo Pineda; Maymay Entrata; Edward Barber
- Cinematography: Miguel Cruz
- Edited by: Chrisel G. Desuasido
- Music by: Jessie Lasaten
- Production company: ABS-CBN Film Productions, Inc.
- Distributed by: Star Cinema
- Release date: April 18, 2018

DOTGA: Da One That Ghost Away (stylized as Da One That Ghost Away) is a 2018 Filipino horror comedy film directed by Tony Y. Reyes and starring Ryan Bang, Kim Chiu, Enzo Pineda and the duo of Maymay Entrata and Edward Barber in their second film after Loving in Tandem (2017). It was released by Star Cinema on April 18, 2018, in cinemas.

== Cast ==
=== Main cast ===
- Ryan Bang as Jerald "Jeje" Zee-Yan
- Kim Chiu as Carmel Monseratt

=== Supporting cast ===
- Enzo Pineda as Jack Colmenares
- Maymay Entrata as Serrah Monseratt
- Edward Barber as Chire
- Pepe Herrera as Bagang
- Lassy Marquez as Ponzi
- Moi Marcampo as Basha
- Divine Tetay as Krissy
- Chokoleit† as Chicken Feet
- Matet de Leon as Halak
- Cai Cortez as Taba ko
- Marissa Delgado as Coquita Monseratt
- Odette Khan as Canturzia Colmenares
- Melai Cantiveros as Anabelle
- Loisa Andalio as Young Canturzia
- Sofia Andres as Young Coquita

=== Special participation ===
- Ronnie Alonte as Isagani

== Reception ==
=== Box office ===
Da One That Ghost Away has reportedly grossed over ₱8 million on its opening day at the Philippine box-office.

== See also ==
- List of ghost films
