= Maalaala Mo Kaya season 29 =

Filipino television series

Maalaala Mo Kaya
- Season 29
- Starring: Charo Santos
- No. of episodes: 47 (excluding re-runs)

Release
- Original network: Kapamilya Channel; A2Z; (replacing ABS-CBN, ad interim)
- Original release: January 2 – December 25, 2021

Season chronology
- ← Previous; Season 28 Next → Season 30

Maalaala Mo Kaya (transl. Would you remember?; abbreviated MMK), also known as Memories in English, is a Philippine anthology series, which was first aired on May 15, 1991. MMK is the longest-running drama anthology on Philippine television. However due to franchise renewal controversy over the network giant ABS-CBN, it shown limitedly on Kapamilya Channel and A2Z Channel 11.

== Episodes ==
#	Episode title	Directed by	Written by	Original air date	Ratings
1	"Singsing" "Wedding Ring"	Raz de la Torre	Mae Rose Balanay-Batacan	January 2, 2021	N/A
After finally taking her family to Dubai through sheer determination and hard work, Vagelyn finds herself looking for someone to fill the gap inside her heart. Following several attempts in dating, she reconnects with high school batchmate and notorious bully, Janwell. Brushing aside their interactions online as mere coincidence, Vagelyn soon realizes the possibility of turning their budding relationship into a life-long commitment. Cast: Angel Aquino, Adrian Alandy, Belle Mariano, Jeremiah Lisbo, Aurora Sevilla, Henz Villaraiz, Gia Muse, Gwem Muse
2	"TV"	Nuel C. Naval	Mary Rose Colindres	January 9, 2021	N/A
Cast: Lara Quigaman, Marco Alcaraz, Victor Silayan, Maru Delgado, JC Alcantara
3	"Tattoo"	Nuel C. Naval	Joan P. Habana	January 16, 2021	N/A
After her heart got broken for the second time because of her boyfriend Gio's incessant infidelity, Karla finds a new reason to be happy upon reconnecting with her former classmate, Ralph. Convinced that he is the right one for her, Karla fights for their love amid her family's and friends' concern about her boyfriend's baggage. Ralph's insecurities, however, begin to put a rift on their relationship, leaving Karla back to square one. A realization soon dawns upon her while she tries to pick herself back up. Cast: Arci Muñoz, Ejay Falcon, Yayo Aguila, Mark McMahon, Karen Reyes, Kiara Takahashi, Diana Mackey, Argel Saycon
4	"Bible"	Dado C. Lumibao	Arah Jell Badayos	January 23, 2021	N/A
Bert instantly forms a friendship with Dodong and takes him under his wing as soon as he finds out his family situation. Despite hating his father Ismael for leaving their family, a strong urge to avenge him engulfs Bert after the former was brutally murdered. Bent on giving justice to his father, his brother Rey's preaching about forgiveness falls on deaf ears until Bert finds himself on death's doorstep. However, the pain of his past haunts him when he finally reunites with Dodong while threading on the spiritual path. Cast: Nash Aguas, Francis Magundayao, Bart Guingona, Tess Antonio, Jomari Angeles, Elyson de Dios
5	"Blouse"	Dado Lumibao	Mae Rose Balanay-Batacan	February 6, 2021	N/A
Cast: Ria Atayde, Malou de Guzman, Jake Cuenca, Levi Ignacio, Lovely Rivero, Bimbo Cerrudo
6	"Planner"	Nuel C. Naval	Joan Habana	February 13, 2021	N/A
Cast: Jameson Blake, Charlie Dizon, Jason Dy, Art Acuña, Ana Abad Santos, Mike Lloren, Anne Feo, Beatriz Teves, Vino Mabalot
7	"Sobre" "Envelope"	Elfren Vibar	Joan P. Habana and Arah Jell G. Badayos	February 20, 2021	N/A
Cast: Dimples Romana, Ketchup Eusebio, Viveika Ravanes, Gillian Vicencio, Izzy Canillo, Michael Roy Jornales
8	"Lie Detector"	Raz de la Torre	Chie Floresca	February 27, 2021	N/A
Cast: Jane Oineza, Nathalie Hart, Rochelle Barrameda, Roeder Camanag, Gian Wang, Yana Pamular
9	"Bigas" "Rice"	Raz de la Torre	Mae Rose Balanay-Batacan	March 13, 2021	N/A
Cast: Angeline Quinto, Irma Adlawan, Mary Joy Apostol, Lito Pimentel, Arnold Reyes, Yen Quirante, Brian Gocheco, Eisel Serrano
10	"Titulo" "Land Title"	Raz de la Torre	Mae Rose Balanay-Batacan	March 20, 2021	N/A
Rebecca was a hard-working woman in just unusual command by her family in a rural province, since her life became low since she had been argued by her siblings bout their share on allowances and personal problems, will she ever complied to achieve her better goals to live in his foreign spice? Cast: Angeline Quinto, Irma Adlawan, Mary Joy Apostol, Lito Pimentel, Arnold Reyes, Yen Quirante, Brian Gocheco, Eisel Serrano
11	"Tungkod" "Cane"	Dado C. Lumibao	Joan P. Habana	March 27, 2021	N/A
Petrus is a blind person who had ability to make choices to help by staying as close to his brother Raddy although some disadvantages occurred once she made unhonorable needs when he married and no one wondered for when he will cast his dignity. Cast: Joao Constancia, Neil Coleta, Trina Legaspi, Aya Fernandez, Kyle Banzon, Uno Madrid
12	"Entablado" "Stage"	Raz de la Torre	Jaymar Castro	April 10, 2021	N/A
Ivy loves to act on stage but she agreed to put it on hold when her boyfriend Ian asked her to when he proposed marriage so that they can have children. But Ivy was unable to return to acting even after having four children as Ian continued to forbid her. Sacrificing her passion, Ivy set up a school with her husband. Even as she followed a new path in life, the two continued to fight, which eventually resulted in their separation. Ivy was able to pursue acting again with the help of her children and the teachers in her school. This is when she met Carl, a young theater actor whom Ivy had to mentor. Despite their 16 year age gap, Ivy fell in love and took a risk by having a relationship with him. Cast: Rita Avila, Paolo Angeles, William Lorenzo, JB Agustin, Luke Alford, Sophie Reyes, Eisel Serrano, Batit Espiritu
13	"Mesa" "Table"	Raz de la Torre	Jaymar Castro	April 17, 2021	N/A
Cast: Rita Avila, Paolo Angeles, William Lorenzo, JB Agustin, Luke Alford, Sophie Reyes, Eisel Serrano, Batit Espiritu
14	"Quarantine Pass"	Nuel C. Naval	Joan P. Habana	May 8, 2021	N/A
Zaldy and Jex work as chefs in an airline catering services company. Jex has a longtime crush on Zaldy and not wasted time asking him out. But to her disappointment, Zaldy keeps rejecting her invitation. As Jex leaves the company to look for greener pastures, the two eventually lose touch with each other only to reconnect years later after failed relationships. It doesn't take long before they eventually start dating. As the pandemic was brewing, the two decide to push through with their planned trip to Baguio. With their more-than-friends, less-than-lovers status, the two find themselves stuck together indefinitely in the city as Luzon is put into lockdown. Cast: JM de Guzman, Janine Gutierrez
15	"Jacket"	Raz de la Torre	Mae Rose Balanay-Batacan	May 15, 2021	N/A
Larcy's world gets crushed when she learns about her husband Jun's affair with Rose, with whom he has a child named Ryan. But instead of leaving him, Larcy decides to make a sacrifice to make her family complete again. When she learns that the woman has decided to leave Jun, Larcy offers to take care of their son. But her effort does not pay off as their relationship continues to fall apart. Nevertheless, she has no regrets about loving Ryan. Things eventually get complicated when Rose comes back after many years to take Ryan back. Cast: Meryll Soriano, Aljon Mendoza, Ingrid dela Paz, Manuel Chua, Eslove Briones, Brace Arquiza, VJ Mendoza
16	"Mikropono" "Microphone"	Elfren Vibar	Mary Rose Colindres	May 22, 2021	N/A
Cast: JC Alcantara, Nikki Valdez, Jayson Gainza, Joel Molina, Teetin Villanueva
17	"Tricycle"	Raz de la Torre	Joan P. Habana	June 5, 2021 (re-aired on March 26, 2022)	N/A
Rose initially had doubts about JR’s intentions towards her after a heartbreak. Suddenly, she knew that JR had been serious about her, being a longtime admirer see her in the neighborhood he plied his daily route as a tricycle driver. She admit for JR not only showed his pure intentions in wooing her, but eventually fall in love with a guy who even struggles in spelling the words he wants to express. Rose and JR enjoyed a blissful relationship, but they faced terrible stumbling blocks—foremost of which was the disapproval of his father, who thinks she would be up for no good if she continues her romance with JR. When JR confronted Rose, she tearfully apologized and told him she thought he has lost his interest in their relationship because he had not communicated with her for so long. JR told her he had been too busy with work because he needed to shoulder the cost of caring for an ailing father—a fact he did not reveal to Rose, who asked him why he had not told her about it. JR also told Rose that finding another boyfriend was not the solution to their problems and that she should have sought him out to talk about their issues. She asked forgiveness and begged for a second chance. However, when she started work, colleagues would look down on JR, chatting at Rose’s back that she has a bleak future with someone whose work is just a tricycle driver. When JR overheard it, he kept the pain to himself, and not opening up to Rose about it. Rose did not have the faintest idea about JR’s insecurities until the pandemic happened, and Rose asked JR if they could get married soon, given how the challenges of COVID-19 made them see how time is precious and should not be wasted. JR was understandably hesitant, given that he did not have the resources for a grand wedding or even a stable future in supporting their family. But Rose was insistent, telling him that she would shoulder all the costs needed for their wedding, as she landed a new, high-paying job. But his insecurities remained, and JR would show it with the way he acted when they discussed about the wedding. Cast: Pepe Herrera, Kim Molina, Jef Gaitan, Teetin Villanueva, Gian Wang, Acey Aguilar, Heidi Arima, Aloysius Noroña
18	"Flyers"	Jerome Pobocan	Jaymar Castro	June 12, 2021	N/A
Cast: Maris Racal, Cris Villanueva, Ana Abad Santos, Mike Lloren, Jef Gaitan, Acey Aguilar
19	"Bisikleta" "Bicycle"	Jerome Pobocan	Jaymar Castro	June 19, 2021	N/A
Cast: Maris Racal, Cris Villanueva, Ana Abad Santos, Mike Lloren, Jef Gaitan
20	"Dialysis Machine"	Jerry L. Sineneng	Jaymar Castro	July 3, 2021	N/A
Cast: Zaijan Jaranilla, Nonie Buencamino, Lovely Rivero, Karen Reyes, Akihiro Blanco, Jessnah Brignoli, Jessica Marco, Rex Lantano, Luciana Andres
21	"Urn"	Jerry L. Sineneng	Jaymar Castro	July 10, 2021	N/A
Cast: Zaijan Jaranilla, Nonie Buencamino, Karen Reyes, Akihiro Blanco, Jessnah Brignoli, Jessica Marco, Rex Lantano, Abi Kassem
22	"Medalya" "Medal"	Mae Cruz-Alviar	Jaymar Castro	July 24, 2021	N/A
Cast: Iza Calzado, Shamaine Buencamino, Heaven Peralejo, Bart Guingona, Gillian Vicencio, Luciana Andres, Angela Tungol
25	"Libro" "Book"	Raz de la Torre	Mary Rose Colindres	August 14, 2021	N/A
Cast: Yves Flores, Kira Balinger, Alexa Ilacad, Tess Antonio, Arnold Reyes, Jonic Magno, Miggy Campbell, Kim Franco, Emma Viri, Batit Espiritu
28	"Paru-paro" "Butterfly"	Jerome Pobocan	Jaymar S. Castro	September 4, 2021 (re-aired on September 24, 2022)	N/A
Cast: JC de Vera, Christian Bables, Pamu Pamorada, Jessica Marco, Elyson de Dios, Arkin del Rosario
30	"Taho"	Jerome Pobocan	Mae Rose Balanay-Batacan	September 18, 2021	N/A
Cast: Joey Marquez, Levi Ignacio, Maru Delgado, Joel Molina, John Vincent Servilla, Eisel Serrano, Henz Villaraiz, Crismar Menchavez, Rhett Romero, Blaine Medina, Emma Viri
32	"Brush"	Chad Vidanes	Michael Bryan Transfiguracion	October 2, 2021	N/A
Cast: Lotlot de Leon, Jeffrey Santos, Eslove Briones, CJ Salonga, Jeremiah Lisbo, Emma Viri, Arkin del Rosario, Argel Saycon, AC Sangab, Amanda Zamora, Abi Kassem
35	"Scarf"	Raz de la Torre	Jaymar S. Castro	October 23, 2021	N/A
Cast: Miles Ocampo, Michelle Vito, Simon Ibarra, Elaine Plopenio, Argel Saycon, Eisel Serrano, Abi Kassem, Amanda Zamora, Elyson de Dios, Kim Franco, Arkin del Rosario, Rhett Romero
37	"Tattoo"	Jerome Pobocan	Mae Rose Balanay-Batacan	November 6, 2021	N/A
Cast: Enchong Dee, Aurora Sevilla, Ernie Garcia, Jef Gaitan, Elaine Plopenio, Brace Arquiza, Luke Alford, Rex Lantano, Miggy Campbell, Jacqui Leus, Ali Abinal, Angela Tungol, Quincy Villanueva, Kim Perez
