= Loving in Tandem =

2017 Filipino film by Giselle Andres

- Theatrical release poster
- Directed by: Giselle Andres
- Screenplay by: Kristine S. Gabriel; Anjanette Haw
- Story by: Kristine S. Gabriel
- Produced by: Charo Santos-Concio; Malou N. Santos
- Starring: Maymay Entrata; Edward Barber
- Cinematography: Mo Zee
- Edited by: Noah Tonga
- Music by: Patricia R. Lasaten; Ammie Ruth Suarez
- Production company: ABS-CBN Film Productions
- Distributed by: Star Cinema
- Release date: September 13, 2017
- Running time: 108 minutes
- Country: Philippines
- Language: Tagalog

Loving in Tandem is a 2017 Filipino romantic comedy film directed by Giselle Andres, starring Maymay Entrata and Edward Barber. It is their first acting project since their appearances as housemates in the 2016 reality show, Pinoy Big Brother: Lucky 7. It is under the production of Star Cinema and was released nationwide on September 13, 2017.

The film's title is a play on "riding in tandem", a Philippine English term for crimes committed by pairs of criminals riding on motorcycles.

== Plot ==
Shine (Maymay Entrata) is a jolly and happy-go-lucky girl who will do anything for her family. But when it comes to love, she hopelessly tries to find one and wishes to meet her one true love. Until one day, when she was praying to meet the love of her life, she unexpectedly meets Luke (Edward Barber), a rebellious and grumpy Filipino-American boy who was sent to the Philippines by his father from the United States. Despite their complete differences from each other, will they truly find love?

== Cast ==
- Maymay Entrata as Sunshine "Shine" Camantigue
- Edward Barber as Prince Lucas "Luke" Oliver
- Kisses Delavin as Jayzel
- Marco Gallo as Tope
- Carmi Martin as Remedios "Aling Edios"
- Ryan Bang as Gong Woo
- Thou Reyes as Jordan
- Ketchup Eusebio as Elong Camantigue
- Kakai Bautista as Genina
- Onyok Pineda as Macmac Camantigue
- Emman Dolores as Teggy
- April Matienzo as snatcher

== Soundtrack ==
Michael Pangilinan and Marion Aunor recorded a version of Sponge Cola's single (originally by Gino Padilla), "Closer You and I". It was released on September 3, 2017, and served as the film's theme song.
