= Ryan Bang =

South Korean actor and comedian

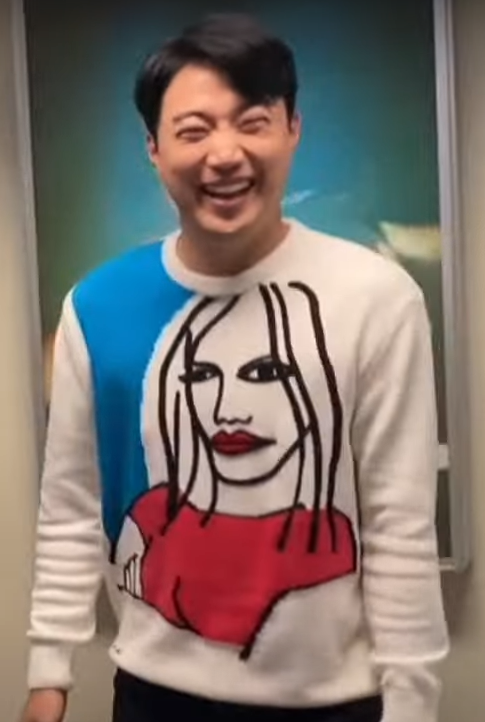
- Bang in 2023
- Born: Bang Hyun-sung; June 16, 1991 (age 35); Seoul, South Korea
- Education: Reedley International School
- Occupations: TV personality; host; comedian; actor; singer; director; producer; writer
- Years active: 2010–present
- Agent: Star Magic (2010–present)
- Musical career
- Genres: Novelty; K-pop
- Instrument: Vocals
- Years active: 2011–present
- Labels: Star Music; Skinny Fat Boy Corporation

Korean name
- Hangul: 방현성
- Hanja: 方縣成
- RR: Bang Hyeonseong
- MR: Pang Hyŏnsŏng

Bang Hyun-sung (Korean: 방현성; Hanja: 方縣成; born 16 June 1991), known professionally as Ryan Bang, is a South Korean host, comedian, actor, singer, and vlogger based in the Philippines. Bang is one of a few Korean expatriates to appear in Philippine television; other expatriates are Sandara Park, Sam Oh, and Grace Lee. He rose to fame in the Philippines through the reality show Pinoy Big Brother: Teen Clash 2010, where he was first runner-up behind eventual winner James Reid. He was the host of his first show 3ow Powhz!, which aired on Studio 23 from 2010 to 2011. A former guest judge on the ABS-CBN variety show It's Showtime, Bang became one of the regular hosts since 2012. He is the main host of reality show Dream Maker.

== Early life ==
Bang is an only child born on 16 June 1991 in Seoul, South Korea, to Bang Du-cheol and Shin Myeong-ja, a former government official father and housewife mother, respectively. In 2005, his parents separated. Bang's mother is a real estate broker, while his father drives a taxi.

== TV career ==
In May 2010, Bang entered the Pinoy Big Brother house, along with ten other housemates. After 56 days, he earned enough votes to reach the Big Night, where he won as Second Big Placer by getting 18.70% of the votes.

In August 2010, Bang appeared as a guest judge (now as a regular host) in the noontime variety show Showtime (now It's Showtime), and stayed on from August 16, 2010 until October 8, 2011. He also hosted his own show 3ow Powhz on Studio 23, appeared in the comedy gag show Banana Split, and made guest appearances on Kim Atienza's program Matanglawin. On the January 1, 2011 episode of Entertainment Live, Bang was named one of 2010's breakthrough artists. On 25 May 2011, he released an album entitled I Lilly Lilly Like It: Ryan Bang Party Party Hits!.

== Other ventures ==
=== Business ===
In February 2024, Bang opened his Korean cuisine restaurant Paldo. On March 16, 2024, Mexican-themed Siesta Horchata Café, the first horchata-centric coffeehouse opened in Quezon City. It is co-owned by Bang and Paola Huyong.

== Personal life ==
=== Tax evasion ===
In January 2013, the Bureau of Internal Revenue (BIR) filed a tax evasion complaint with the Department of Justice (DOJ) against Bang for failure to pay his taxes in 2010 and 2011. The BIR sued him for a tax liability of ₱1.82 million, including surcharges and interests. In February 2013, Bang stated that he would like to appear at the BIR to apologize for the incident. He said that he was still a high school student in 2010, and thus unaware of his responsibility to the Philippine government.

=== Engagement ===
On June 29, 2024, Bang announced his engagement to his non-showbiz girlfriend, Paola Huyong. However, on June 6, 2026, he confirmed during an appearance on Vice Ganda's YouTube channel that their engagement had been called off.

== Filmography ==
=== Film ===
| Year | Title | Role |
|---|---|---|
| 2012 | Every Breath U Take | Ji-sun |
| 2012 | Born To Love You | cameo appearance |
| 2012 | Kimmy Dora and the Temple of Kiyeme | teenager Luisito Go Dong Hae |
| 2012 | 24/7 in Love | Commercial model |
| 2013 | Raketeros | Bryan Bang |
| 2013 | Girl, Boy, Bakla, Tomboy | Jun Pyo |
| 2015 | Beauty and the Bestie | Jin Jhong |
| 2017 | Mang Kepweng Returns | Mang Ben |
| 2017 | My Ex and Whys | Lee |
| 2017 | Loving in Tandem | Gong Gung |
| 2017 | Seven Sundays | Mr. Kim |
| 2017 | The Ghost Bride | cameo appearance |
| 2018 | Da One That Ghost Away | Jerald "Jeje" Zee-Yan |
| 2018 | Kusina Kings | Gian Nyeam |
| 2018 | Fantastica | Gang Nam |
| 2019 | The Mall, The Merrier | Nurse |
| 2020 | Mang Kepweng: Ang Lihim ng Bandanang Itim | Janwick |
| 2021 | Mommy Issues | Jae Ho |
| 2021 | Love is Color Blind | himself |
| 2025 | Meet, Greet & Bye | Park Seo-joon's Friend |

=== Television ===
| Year | Title | Role |
|---|---|---|
| 2010 | Pinoy Big Brother: Teen Clash 2010 | Himself (Housemate; 2nd Big Placer) |
| 2010–present | It's Showtime | Himself |
| 2010–2011 | 3ow Powhz! | Himself |
| 2010–2020 | Banana Split | Himself |
| 2010–2011 | Shoutout! | Himself |
| 2010–2011 | Matanglawin | Himself |
| 2011 | Happy, Yipee, Yehey | Himself |
| 2011 | Maynila | Various |
| 2011 | I Dare You | Himself |
| 2011 | Junior MasterChef Pinoy Edition | Himself |
| 2012 | Kung Ako'y Iiwan Mo | Leo |
| 2013 | EsKWELAhan ni Ryan Bang | Himself |
| 2014 | Home Sweetie Home | Ryan |
| 2014 | Kaya Mo Bang!: The Fudgee Barr Adventures | Himself |
| 2014 | Hawak-Kamay | Bok |
| 2015 | Kapamilya, Deal or No Deal | Himself (Briefcase #1) |
| 2015 | Wansapanataym Presents: Yamishita's Treasure | Kim |
| 2015 | Aquino & Abunda Tonight | Himself |
| 2016 | It's Showtime Holy Week Drama Special: "Brod" | Fraternity victim |
| 2016 | Family Feud | Guest (celebrity contestant) |
| 2016 | Screening Humanity | Himself |
| 2017 | Infinite Challenge | Himself (celebrity interpreter) |
| 2018 | Human Documentary: People Is Good | Himself |
| 2018 | Sana Dalawa ang Puso | Chot Jeon Jae |
| 2018 | Video Star | Himself |
| 2018 | Battle Trip | Himself |
| 2020 | Gandang Gabi, Vice! | Himself (guest co-host) |
| 2022–2023 | Dream Maker: Search For the Next Global Pop Group | Himself (main host) |
| 2023 | Running Man | Himself (celebrity interpreter) |
| 2023 | Bubble Gang | Guest |
| 2024 | Unang Hirit | Guest |

== Discography ==
=== Studio albums ===
| Year | Title | Label |
|---|---|---|
| 2011 | I Lilly Lilly Like It: Ryan Bang Party Party Hits! | |
| 2015 | Shopping | Skinny Fat Boy Corporation |

=== Single ===
| Year | Title | Note |
|---|---|---|
| 2011 | I Lilly Lilly Like It | |
| 2015 | Shopping (feat. Donnalyn Bartolome) | |
| 2016 | "Like Love Follow" | |

== Awards and nominations ==
| Year | Award | Category | Nominated work | Result | Ref. |
|---|---|---|---|---|---|
| 2012 | 26th PMPC Star Awards for Television | Best Reality / Game Show Host (shared with It's Showtime hosts) | It's Showtime | Won | |
| 2012 | 26th PMPC Star Awards for Television | Celebrity Skin of the Night | | Won | |
