= Edward Barber (actor) =

Filipino-British actor and host (born 2000)

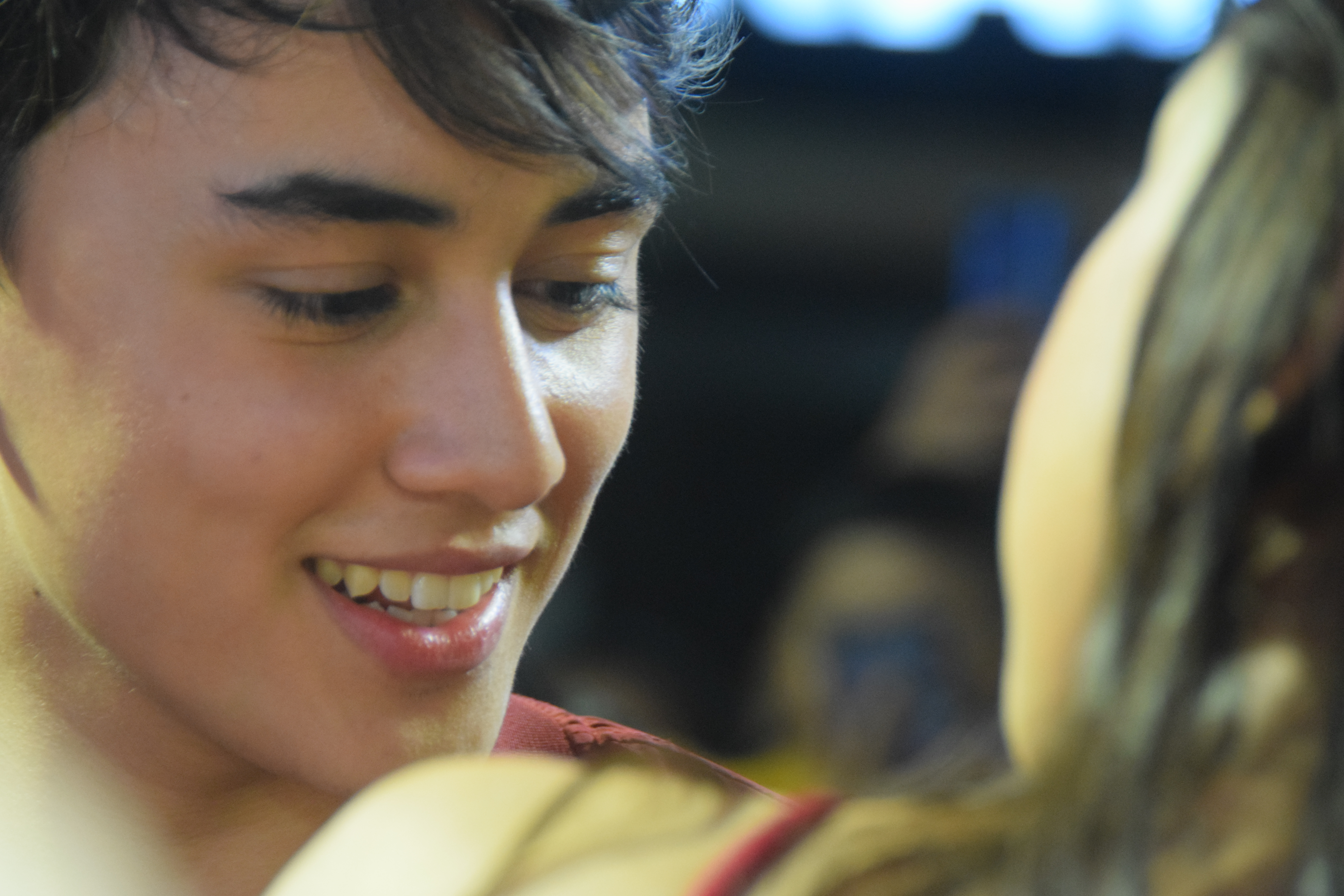
- Born: Edward John Abellera Barber; July 15, 2000 (age 26); Heidelberg, Germany
- Occupations: Actor; host; singer
- Years active: 2016–present
- Agent: Star Magic (2017–present)
- Musical career
- Genres: Pop
- Years active: 2017–present
- Label: Star Music

Edward John Abellera Barber (born July 15, 2000) is a Filipino-British actor and host who came to prominence in 2016, after joining the reality television series Pinoy Big Brother: Lucky 7, where he placed fourth.

Barber started his film career by playing the lead role in the romantic comedy Loving in Tandem (2017). He also played supporting roles in Seven Sundays (2017), Da One That Ghost Away (2018), and Fantastica (2018). He also starred in the drama television series Hiwaga ng Kambat (2019). In addition to acting, Barber ventured into the music industry with his debut studio album #E0806.

== Early life ==
Edward John Abellera Barber was born in Heidelberg, Germany, on July 15, 2000, to British-German entrepreneur Kevin and Filipina mother Cathy (née Abellera). He has an older sister.

Barber attended the European School, Karlsruhe in Germany where he discovered his interest for acting by joining the school's extra-curricular activities. Barber placed his education on hold when he joined Pinoy Big Brother.

== Career ==
Barber was sixteen when he was asked to audition online for Pinoy Big Brother after staff from The Filipino Channel took a photo of him in a Dolce Amore event in Germany. He succeeded in joining and was later introduced as the first contestant of the show. Barber was later announced as a semi-finalist on the show and had to temporarily exit due to the program's format. Meanwhile, Barber, together with the other semi-finalists, Maymay Entrata, and Kisses Delavin, took part in an online reality series called Follow the Lucky 3 Teens, which follows their journey after momentarily exiting the house. The show's finale was held on March 5, 2017, at the Alonte Sports Arena where he was declared as one of the runners-up, with Entrata winning the competition.

In September 2017 Maymay Entrata and Edward Barber, popularly known with their loveteam "MayWard", played the lead roles for their debut film, Loving in Tandem, which was released nationwide on September 13, 2017. Right after, he got a cameo role in the box office hit film Seven Sundays.

He joined Maymay to make a teleserye debut on the television series La Luna Sangre.

== Personal life ==
Barber announced his engagement to his non showbiz partner on August 2026.

== Other ventures ==
=== Philanthropy ===
ELM Tree Foundation, a charity organization founded by Barber, his sister Laura, and Entrata, was formally launched on December 19, 2017. It takes its name from the initials of their name.

=== Endorsement ===
Fresh from Pinoy Big Brother house, he together with on-screen partner Maymay Entrata joined McDonald's family as the newest endorsers of the new Creamy McFreeze. They also became one of the newest endorsers for Bench (Philippine clothing brand). MayWard joined the launching of Ariel Philippines’ new product, the NEW Ariel with Downy Perfume on May 18, 2017, with the #ArielWhatAFeeling trending nationwide.

== Filmography ==
=== Film ===
Year	Title	Role	Notes	Ref.
2017	Loving in Tandem	Prince Lucas "Luke" Oliver	Main role	
2017	Seven Sundays	Gian S. Bonifacio	Cameo	
2018	Da One That Ghost Away	Chire	Supporting role	
2018	First Love	Simon	Supporting role	
2018	Fantastica	Junjun Padilla	Supporting role, Official MMFF 2018 entry	
2021	Princess DayaReese	Caleb	Main role	

=== Television ===
Year	Title	Role	Notes	Ref.
2016	Pinoy Big Brother: Lucky 7	Himself	Contestant	
2017–2018	La Luna Sangre	Collin Domingo		
2018	Wansapanataym	Vincent	Episode: "Ikaw Ang GHOSTo Ko"; 10 episodes	
2018	ASAP TLC (True Love Connection)	Ben Pineda	Television special	
2019	Ipaglaban Mo!	Jake	Villain Role	
2019–2020	Myx	Himself	Video jockey	
2019	Hiwaga ng Kambat	Francisco "Iking" Castro		
2019	Maalaala Mo Kaya	Gab Sta. Ana	Episode: "Sunflower"	
2023	The ABS-CBN Ball 2023	Himself / Host		

=== Digital ===
Year	Title	Role	Ref.
2017	Follow the Lucky Three Teens	Himself	
2017	Squad Goals	Himself	
2018	ASAP Chillout	Himself (host)	
2018–present	iWant ASAP	Himself (host)	

=== Book ===
Year	Title	Role	Ref.
2017	He's My Oppastar!	Red	
2018	Lost Souls	Himself	

== Discography ==
=== Album ===
Title	Album details	Tracks	Certifications
#E0806	Released: April 28, 2019; Label: Star Music; Formats: Digital download, streaming	1. BMG; 2. Please Stay; 3. Meant To Be; 4. No One Else; 5. 'Di Makatulog; 6. BMG - Minus One; 7. Please Stay - Minus One; 8. Meant To Be - Minus One; 9. No One Else - Minus One; 10. 'Di Makatulog - Minus One	—

=== Singles ===
Title	Year	Album
"Please Stay"	2018	#E0806
"BMG"	2018	#E0806
"No One Else"	2019	#E0806

== Awards and nominations ==
Award	Year (Note: Indicates the year of ceremony. Each year is linked to the article about the awards held that year, wherever possible.)	Recipient(s) and nominee(s)	Category (Note: Awards in certain categories do not have prior nominations and only winners are announced by the jury. For simplification and to avoid errors, each award in this list has been presumed to have had a prior nomination.)	Result	Ref.
ASAP Pop Teen Choice	2016	Edward Barber (with Maymay Entrata)	Best Pop Love Teens	Won	
ASAP Pop Teen Choice	2017	Edward Barber (with Maymay Entrata)	Best Pop Love Teens	Won	
ComGuild Academe's Choice Awards	2018	Edward Barber (with Maymay Entrata)	Advertisers' Most Admired Love Team	Won	
Guillermo Mendoza Box Office Awards	2019	Edward Barber (with Maymay Entrata)	Most Promising Loveteam for Movies	Won	
LionhearTV RAWR Awards	2017	Edward Barber (with Maymay Entrata)	Love Team of the Year	Won	
LionhearTV RAWR Awards	2018	Edward Barber (with Maymay Entrata)	Love Team of the Year	Won	
MOR Pinoy Music Awards	2017	Edward Barber (with Maymay Entrata)	Best New Artist	Nominated	
MOR Pinoy Music Awards	2017	"Baliw" (with Maymay Entrata)	Best Collaboration	Won	
MOR Pinoy Music Awards	2019	"BMG"	LSS Hit of the Year	Nominated	
Myx Music Awards	2018	Edward Barber	Myx Celebrity VJ of the Year	Won	
Push Awards	2017	Edward Barber	Push New Comer	Won	
Push Awards	2017	Edward Barber (with Maymay Entrata)	Push Group/Tandem of the Year	Won	
Push Awards	2019	Edward Barber (with Maymay Entrata)	Push Group/Tandem of the Year	Won	
Push Awards	2020	Edward Barber (with Maymay Entrata)	Push Young Love of the Year	Won	
PMPC Star Awards for Movies	2019	Fantastica (with Maymay Entrata)	Movie Love Team of the Year	Nominated	
PMPC Star Awards for Television	2019	Edward Barber (with Maymay Entrata)	German Moreno Power Tandem Award	Won	
RTU Kidlat Sinaya Awards	2019	Edward Barber	Male Celebrity Endorser of the Year	Won	
RTU Kidlat Sinaya Awards	2019	Edward Barber (with Maymay Entrata)	Loveteam of the Year	Won	
Star Cinema Awards	2017	Edward Barber	Ultimate Fresh Male Face	Won	
Star Cinema Awards	2017	Edward Barber (with Maymay Entrata)	Ultimate Love Out Loud Pair	Won	
Star Cinema Awards	2017	Edward Barber (with Maymay Entrata)	Ultimate Breakthrough Love Team	Nominated	
