= Onyok Pineda =

Filipino actor (born 2010)

- Born: Xymon Ezekiel Nulos Pineda; October 1, 2010 (age 15); Bacoor, Cavite, Philippines
- Occupation: Actor
- Years active: 2015–2022
- Agent: Star Magic (2015–2022)

Xymon Ezekiel Nulos "Onyok" Pineda (born October 1, 2010) (Tagalog: [ˈonjɔk pɪˈnɛdɐ]), is a Filipino child actor. He came to prominence in 2014 when he joined a segment in the variety show It's Showtime. His acting career started when he played Onyok in the 2015 action drama television series Ang Probinsyano; a role in which he would briefly reprise in the series' final episode in August 2022. Pineda made his film debut in a supporting role in the action-comedy The Super Parental Guardians (2016). His other film appearances are in the romantic comedy Loving in Tandem (2017), and Ang Panday (2017).

== Life and career ==
Onyok Pineda was born as Xymon Ezekiel Nulos Pineda on October 1, 2010, in Bacoor, Cavite. He finished elementary school at Real Central Elementary School in 2023.

Pineda came to fame when he joined a segment called "Mini-Me" in the variety show It's Showtime and made a young impersonation of the Filipino singer Bamboo. Pineda started his acting career in Ang Probinsyano as Onyok the adoptive son of Cardo. Pineda is one of the cast in The Super Parental Guardians as Ernie Gaspar, a brother of Megan Gaspar role of Awra Briguela.

== Filmography ==
=== Film ===
Year	Title	Role	Note	Ref.
2016	The Super Parental Guardians	Ernesto "Ernie" Nabati	First in a child star supporting role	
2017	Loving in Tandem	Macmac	Supporting role	
2017	Ang Panday	Dwendol	Supporting role, official 43rd Metro Manila Film Festival entry	
2019	3pol Trobol: Huli Ka Balbon!	young Apollo "Pol" C. Balbon	Special participation, official 45th Metro Manila Film Festival entry	

=== Television ===
Year	Title	Role	Notes	Ref.
2014	It's Showtime	Mini version of Bamboo	Segment: Mini-Me	
2015–2017; 2022	Ang Probinsyano	Honorio "Onyok" Amaba		
2017	Wansapanataym	Onyok	Episode: Amazing Ving; cameo	
2018	Your Face Sounds Familiar Kids	Himself	Contestant	
2018	The Kid's Choice	Himself		
2019	Maalaala Mo Kaya	Young Rene	Episode: "Family Portrait"	
2019	Maalaala Mo Kaya	Mario	Episode: "Balsa"	
2019	Maalaala Mo Kaya	Young Yamyam	Episode: "Bukid"	
2019	The Haunted	Enchong		

== Awards and nominations ==
Award	Year (Note: Indicates the year of ceremony. Each year is linked to the article about the awards held that year, wherever possible.)	Recipient(s) and nominee(s)	Category (Note: Awards in certain categories do not have prior nominations and only winners are announced by the jury. For simplification and to avoid errors, each award in this list has been presumed to have had a prior nomination.)	Result	Ref.
Box Office Entertainment Awards	2016	Ang Probinsyano	Most Popular Child Performer	Won	
Box Office Entertainment Awards	2017	Ang Probinsyano	Most Popular Male Child Performer	Nominated	
Comguild Academe's Choice Awards	2017	Onyok Pineda	Most Admired Child Endorser	Won	
LionhearTV RAWR Awards	2017	Onyok Pineda	Bibo Award	Nominated	
PMPC Star Awards for Movies	2017	The Super Parental Guardians	New Movie Actor of the Year	Nominated	
PMPC Star Awards for Movies	2017	The Super Parental Guardians	Child Performer of the Year	Nominated	
PMPC Star Awards for Television	2016	Ang Probinsyano	Best New Male TV Personality	Won	
PMPC Star Awards for Television	2016	Ang Probinsyano	Best Child Performer	Nominated	
