= Kisses Delavin =

Filipino former actress (born 1999)

- Born: Kirsten Danielle Tan Delavin; May 1, 1999 (age 27); Masbate City, Philippines
- Education: De La Salle University
- Occupations: Actress; musician
- Years active: 2016–2022
- Musical career
- Genres: OPM; pop
- Instrument: Vocals
- Label: Star Music (2017–2019)
- Beauty pageant titleholder
- Title: Miss Kaogma 2016
- Major competitions: Miss Universe Philippines 2021; (Top 10); (Miss Photogenic)

Signature
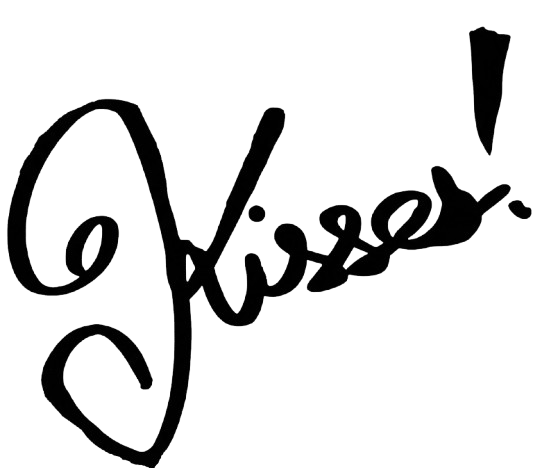

Kirsten Danielle Tan Delavin (Tagalog pronunciation: [ˈdelɐbin]; born May 1, 1999), popularly known as Kisses Delavin, is a Filipino former actress. She came to prominence in 2016 as a contestant in the reality television series, Pinoy Big Brother: Lucky 7, where she placed second.

== Early life and education ==
Kisses Delavin was born as Kirsten Danielle Tan Delavin on May 1, 1999, in Masbate, Philippines. At age 6, Delavin was diagnosed with viral encephalitis. Her mother describes her as a "miracle baby" as out of the eight pregnancies that she had, only Delavin survived. She is of Chinese descent.

Delavin attended De La Salle University (DLSU) to pursue a bachelor's degree in accountancy then placed it on hold when she joined Pinoy Big Brother: Lucky 7. In 2019, she returned to DLSU, where she studied towards a Bachelor of Science degree in business administration.

Delavin is currently studying contemporary dance at Martha Graham School in New York City.

== Career ==
Delavin began her career as a print-ad model for Natasha, a direct selling company carrying shoes, apparel, and accessories in the Philippines. She then subsequently had a short appearance in the drama series Pangako Sa 'Yo (2015).

In 2016, Delavin auditioned for the thirteenth season of the reality television series Pinoy Big Brother after she saw an advertisement on Facebook and was later on chosen and officially introduced as one of the teen housemates. On the late-night talk show Tonight with Boy Abunda, when asked by Abunda the reason she joined, Delavin said "to prove that she is ready to become an independent woman". She was later announced as a semi-finalist on the show and had to temporarily exit due to the program's format. During the show's finale, Delavin was announced as a runner-up, with her closest friend in the PBB house, Maymay Entrata winning the competition.

Delavin has appeared on episodes of Minute to Win It, Family Feud, Gandang Gabi Vice, Tonight with Boy Abunda, It's Showtime, ASAP, Magandang Buhay, Umagang Kay Ganda, Banana Sundae, Rated K, and Matanglawin.

Together with her co-PBB housemate Marco Gallo, she was the MYX Celebrity VJ for the month of July 2017. Collectively known as KissMarc, they also starred in Young JV's music video for the song "Kulay". They appeared together on several online and print materials, public engagements, and ABS-CBN TV shows and movies. Despite the success, the team-up ended following a controversial interview in the online show, Kapamilya Chat. In October 2017, Delavin signed a contract under Star Music. She was the first official artist under the music sub-label, Star Pop. Tickets to her self-titled grand album launch in November 2017 sold out within 30 minutes. More than 15,000 units of her album were sold the day prior to its launch. She formally received her Gold and Platinum Awards from Philippine Association of the Record Industry (PARI) on the January 21, 2018, episode of ASAP.

In February 2018, Delavin's first solo sold-out concert entitled Confidently Kisses was held at KIA Theatre, with guests Sam Milby, Karla Estrada, Marlo Mortel, and Tony Labrusca. In 2018, Delavin became one of the regular hosts of ASAP Chillout.

She also appeared twice on the front cover of MEGA Magazine. The March issue pictorial was set in Prague, Czech Republic.

She was teamed up with MYX VJ Donny Pangilinan (dubbed as DonKiss by their fans) for the movies Walwal and Fantastica. They later on starred in the hit romantic comedy daytime television series, Playhouse.

For five consecutive years (2017–2021), Delavin was among Twitter's Top 10 Most tweeted about accounts in the Philippines. She was also named The Most Beautiful Woman in the Philippines by Starmometer in 2020.

In April 2019, Delavin had her 2nd solo sold-out concert entitled A Life Full Of Kisses at Music Museum.

In November 2019, Delavin left Star Magic and signed with APT Entertainment and Triple A Management. She is currently a freelance artist and started appearing on some of the TV programs of GMA Network.

Delavin has appeared on an episode of Mars Pa More, The Boobay and Tekla Show, Tonight with Arnold Clavio, All-Out Sundays, Eat Bulaga, Unang Hirit and Wowowin on GMA Network.

In December 2020, Delavin stated that she would take a break from the entertainment industry by moving back to Masbate to focus on her studies, which caused her projects and lock-in tapings to be placed on hiatus until further notice, due to her parents not allowing her amidst the COVID-19 pandemic in the Philippines. In May 2021, during an interview with Ricky Lo, Delavin has confirmed that she would return to Manila from Masbate once the COVID-19 vaccines are fully rolled out.

=== Pageantry ===
Delavin was entered in her first beauty pageant at the age of 3. In 2013 she won Miss Teen Masbate, and Miss Masbate and Miss Kaogma in 2016.

In 2021 Delavin represented Masbate at Miss Universe Philippines 2021 on September 30, 2021, in Bohol, and finished as a top 10 finalist.

After competing in the pageant, Delavin moved to the United States and studied dance at the Martha Graham School in New York City.

== Filmography ==
=== Film ===
| Year | Title | Role | Ref. |
|---|---|---|---|
| 2017 | Loving in Tandem | Jayzel | |
| 2018 | Walwal | Ruby Rose Manalaysay | |
| 2018 | Fantastica | Princess Ariella | |
| 2020 | D'Ninang | Mikhaela "Mikhai" Angeles | |

=== Television ===
| Year | Title | Role | Notes |
|---|---|---|---|
| 2015 | Pangako Sa 'Yo | Bar Girl | Cameo |
| 2016–2017 | Pinoy Big Brother: Lucky 7 | Herself | Contestant |
| 2016–2019 | ASAP | Herself | Performer |
| 2017 | Wansapanataym | Chelsea Del Carmen | Episode: "Amazing Ving" |
| 2017 | Ipaglaban Mo! | Dianne | Episode: "Groufie" |
| 2018 | ASAP Chillout | Herself | Host |
| 2018–2019 | Playhouse | Shiela Ramos-Ubaldo | |
| 2019 | Ipaglaban Mo! | Miya Buenaobra | Episode: "Desperada" |
| 2019 | Eat Bulaga! | Herself | Contestant |
| 2020 | Daig Kayo ng Lola Ko | Oceana | Episode: "Mermaid for each other" |
| 2020 | All-Out Sundays | Herself | Performer |
| 2020 | Dear Uge | Amy Caranto | Episode: "Viral Maging Judgemental" |
| 2021 | Eat Bulaga! | Herself | Contestant |

=== Digital ===
| Year | Title | Role |
|---|---|---|
| 2016–2019 | Kapamilya Chat | Herself / Guest |
| 2017 | One Music Popssss S03E09 | Herself |
| 2017 | Squad Goals | Herself |
| 2017 | Follow the Lucky 3 Teens | Herself |
| 2018 | One Music Popssss S05E05 | Herself |
| 2018 | One Music LUH | Herself |
| 2018 | ASAP Chillout Squad | Herself |
| 2018 | Alamat ng Ano: Nura and Velma | Velma |
| 2019 | ZEKElingMagingSHIELA: The Zeke and Shiela's Almost Love Story | Shiela Ramos-Ubaldo |
| 2020 | The Best Talk: Season 1 | Herself / Guest |
| 2021 | Puregold Sabado Bago Live | Herself / Guest |
| 2021 | The Purple Chair Interview | Herself / Guest |
| 2021 | Talk About It with Queen MJ | Herself / Guest |
| 2021 | Live Chat with Heyadamg | Herself / Guest |
| 2021 | BA's Take Talk | Herself / Guest co-host |

=== Commercials ===
| Year | Brand Name | Role | Notes |
|---|---|---|---|
| 2017–2020 | Palmolive Shampoo & Conditioner | Herself | - |

== Discography ==
=== Albums ===
| Year | Title | Album details | Tracks | Certifications |
|---|---|---|---|---|
| 2017 | Kisses | Released: November 6, 2017; Label: Star Music; Formats: Digital download, streaming | 1. Lalala; 2. Alam na This; 3. Tulak ng Bibig, Kabig ng Dibdib; 4. Di Ko Lang Masabi; 5. Pretty Boy; 6. Lalala - Minus One; 7. Alam na This - Minus One; 8. Tulak ng Bibig, Kabig ng Dibdib - Minus One; 9. Di Ko Lang Masabi - Minus One; 10. Pretty Boy - Minus One | Platinum |

=== Singles ===
| Year | Album | Title | Certification | Record label |
|---|---|---|---|---|
| 2017 | Kisses | "Di Ko Lang Masabi" | Platinum (pre-order) | Star Pop |
| 2017 | Kisses | "Pretty Boy" | Platinum | Star Pop |
| 2017 | Kisses | "Alam na This" | Platinum | Star Pop |

=== Concert ===
| Year | Title |
|---|---|
| 2018 | Confidently Kisses |
| 2019 | A Life Full of Kisses |

== Awards and nominations ==
| Year | Award-giving body/competition | Award/category | Result |
|---|---|---|---|
| 2013 | Miss Teen Masbate | | Won |
| 2015 | Miss Teen Earth | | Finalist |
| 2016 | ASAP POP Teens Choice Awards | ASAP Pop Teen Sweetheart | Won |
| 2016 | Miss Masbate Province | | Won |
| 2016 | Miss Kaogma | | Won |
| 2017 | Starmometer | 100 Most Beautiful Women in the Philippines 2017 | Won: Rank No. 11 |
| 2017 | Star Magic Ball | Fan Fave | Won |
| 2017 | Star Magic Ball | Cornetto Tip-To-Top Best Dressed Couple with Marco Gallo | Won |
| 2017 | 31st PMPC Star Awards for TV | Best New Female TV Personality Wansapanataym | Nominated |
| 2017 | Pinoy Big Brother: Lucky 7 | 2nd Lucky Big Placer | Won |
| 2018 | Starmometer | 100 Most Beautiful Women in the Philippines 2018 | Won: Rank No. 1 |
| 2018 | 5th starcinema.com.ph Awards | Ultimate Movie Trailer | Won for "Walwal" with Donny Pangilinan |
| 2018 | 5th starcinema.com.ph Awards | Ultimate Movie Line | Won for "Nobody can tell you what can make you happy except yourself", said by the character Ruby in "Walwal" |
| 2018 | ABS-CBN Ball | Fan Fave | Won |
| 2018 | Myx Music Awards 2018 | Myx Celebrity VJ of the Year | Nominated (with Marco Gallo) |
| 2018 | Myx Music Awards 2018 | Favorite Guest Appearance in a Music Video Kulay by Young JV | Nominated (with Marco Gallo) |
| 2019 | Starometer | 100 Most Beautiful Women in the Philippines 2019 | Won: Rank No. 5 |
| 2019 | ABS-CBN Ball | Fan Fave | Won |
| 2019 | 35th PMPC Star Awards for Movies | New Movie Actress of the Year | Nominated |
| 2019 | 35th PMPC Star Awards for Movies | Movie Love Team of the Year | Nominated (with Donny Pangilinan) |
| 2019 | 50th Guillermo Mendoza Box Office Awards | Most Promising Female Star | Won |
| 2019 | Inside Showbiz Awards | Favorite Love Team Award | Won (with Donny Pangilinan) |
| 2020 | Starmometer | 100 Most Beautiful Women in the Philippines 2020 | Won: Rank No. 1 |
| 2021 | Miss Universe Philippines 2021 | Top 10 | Finalist |
| 2022 | The 4th Gawad Lasallianeta Awards | Green Zeal Awardee (Lasallian Public Communicator) | Won |
