= Fantastica (2018 film) =

- Theatrical release poster
- Directed by: Barry Gonzalez
- Screenplay by: Moira Lang; Danno Kristoper C. Mariquit; Daisy G. Cayanan; Fatrick Tabada
- Story by: Enrico C. Santos; Daisy G. Cayanan; Jonathan James A. Albano
- Produced by: Moira Lang; Vincent del Rosario III; Veronique del Rosario-Corpus
- Starring: Vice Ganda; Richard Gutierrez; Dingdong Dantes
- Cinematography: Anne Monzon
- Edited by: Joyce Bernal (chief); Noah Tonga
- Music by: Emerzon Texon
- Production companies: ABS-CBN Film Productions; Viva Films
- Distributed by: Star Cinema
- Release date: December 25, 2018
- Running time: 113 minutes
- Country: Philippines
- Language: Filipino
- Box office: ₱596 million

Fantastica is a 2018 Filipino fantasy comedy film directed by Barry Gonzales. It stars an ensemble cast including Vice Ganda, Bela Padilla, Richard Gutierrez, Jaclyn Jose, and Dingdong Dantes. Produced by Star Cinema and Viva Films, the film serves as an official entry to the 2018 Metro Manila Film Festival. The film was released on December 25, 2018. It received mixed reviews from critics, praising the film's special effects but criticizing the lack of character development and some of the comedic scenes.

This also marked the last film appearance of comedian Chokoleit, who died after suffering a fatal heart attack in Bangued, Abra on March 9, 2019, at the age of 48.

== Plot ==
Kleia Blythe, the proprietor of a struggling carnival named Perya Wurtzbach (a pun on Pia Wurtzbach), is tasked by a princess Sxia Blythe to find three princesses of the knight's land Fantastica. The princesses was warped to Earth two world separately, where the carnival’s crew must track them down to help save Fantastica, but eventually live regular lives there. But an evil fairy godmother spreads on Fantastica, and his rival Hannah Velax is on their throats. The mission's cover is to revive the carnival to lure the princesses.

== Cast ==
=== Main cast ===
- Vice Ganda as Belat Padilla / Princess Drilon
- Richard Gutierrez as Prince Pryce
- Dingdong Dantes as Dong Nam

=== Supporting cast ===
- Bela Padilla as Fairy Godmother
- Jaclyn Jose as Perfecta "Fec" Padilla
- Maymay Entrata as Princess Maulani
- Edward Barber as Junjun Padilla
- Loisa Andalio as Princess Rapunselya
- Ronnie Alonte as Daks Padilla
- Kisses Delavin as Princess Ariella
- Donny Pangilinan as Pepe Padilla
- Ryan Bang as Gang Nam
- Milo (Celebrity Dog) as Boylet

=== Extended cast ===
- MC Calaquian as Chubbylyn Jose
- Lassy Marquez as Chakalyn Jose
- Chokoleit as Princess Beauty
- Johnny Revilla as King Amarillo / King Ama
- Angelika Mapanganib as Angry Bird
- Joven Olvido

=== Special participation ===
- Marian Rivera-Dantes (cameo appearance)
- Sarah Lahbati (cameo appearance)
- Zion Gutierrez as Boylet in human form
- Jackie Gonzaga as Ate Girl
- Gus Abelgas as the voice of the Fairy Godmother
- Joshua Colet as young Prince Amarillo
- Kira Balinger as young Fec
- Marigona Dona Dragusha
- Mary Jean Lastimosa
- Atty. Jose Sison
- El Gamma Penumbra

== Reception ==
=== Critical response ===
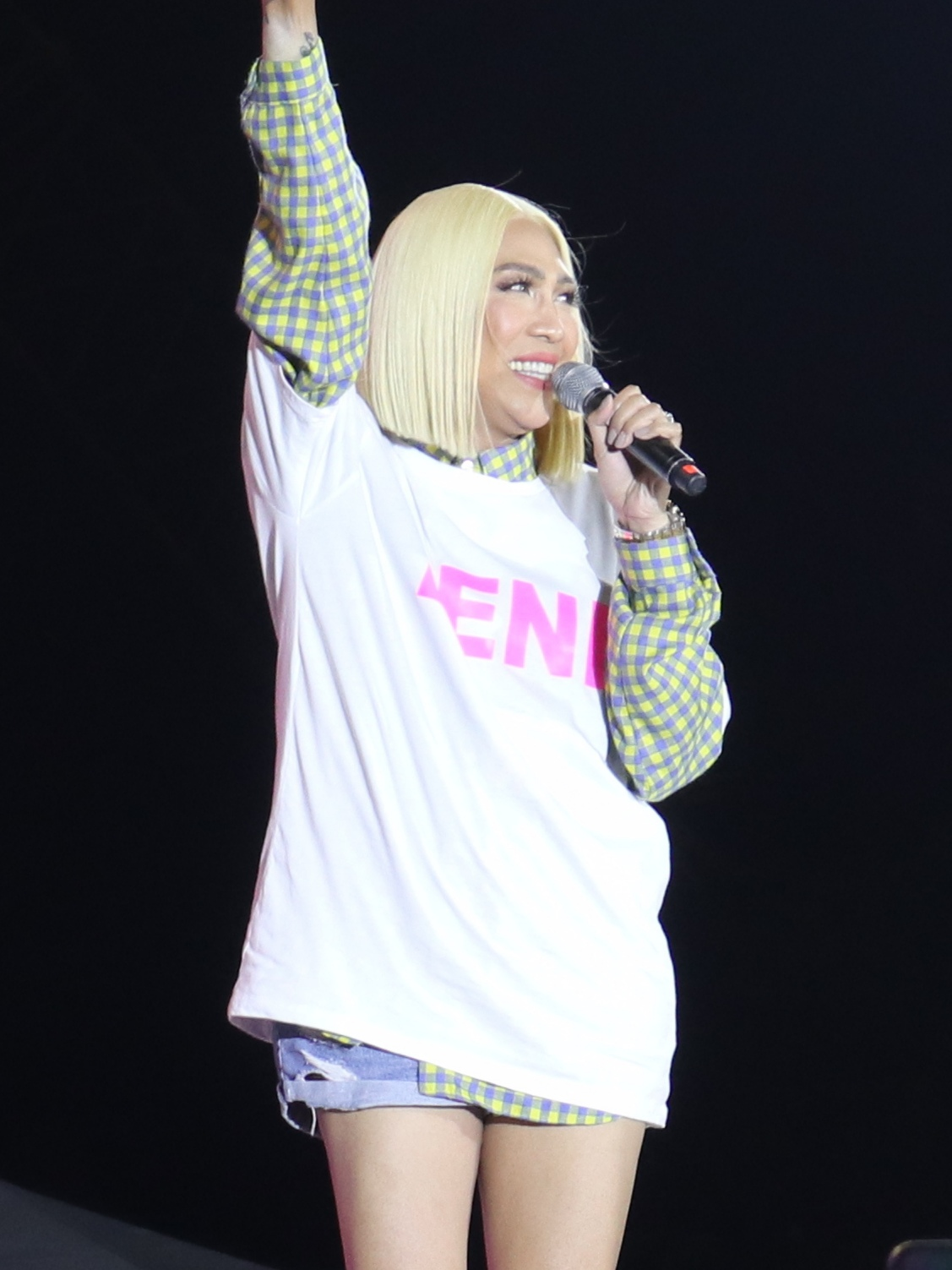
While praise was directed at the film's use of special effects and its carnival setting, Vice Ganda's performance in Fantastica received mixed reviews from critics who viewed his continued reliance on insult comedy and innuendos as stale and repetitive.

Fantastica was released to mixed reviews from critics. Zsarlene B. Chua of BusinessWorld praised the opening sequence by El Gamma Penumbra, fourth wall-breaking jokes and the film's parodies of various drama films, but viewed Vice's continued reliance on insult comedy and innuendos as stale and repetitive, saying "The movie's premise and sheer starpower guarantee the film will be a blockbuster, but if you're expecting something new from Mr. Viceral's yearly MMFF entry, you're bound to be disappointed as it is more of the same: innuendos (which makes one question why it's rated PG) and his usual insult comedy." She did however conclude that "it's a feel-good if mind-numbing film for people who want to shut down and get a few laughs here and there."

John Magbanua of Bandera also gave the film a mixed review, praising the film's special effects and romantic pairings but was critical of the formulaic production and what he noted as censorship done presumably to make the film more family-friendly. Magbanua also noted that Fantastica could have incorporated more carnival elements to further justify the film's narrative.

=== Box office ===
It was announced by Star Cinema in a thanksgiving dinner organized for Fantastica, that the film became the highest grossing MMFF film which starred Vice Ganda. Fantastica earned ₱596 million with the figure including earnings from both domestic and international release of the film.
