= Baby Dolls =

Filipino girl group

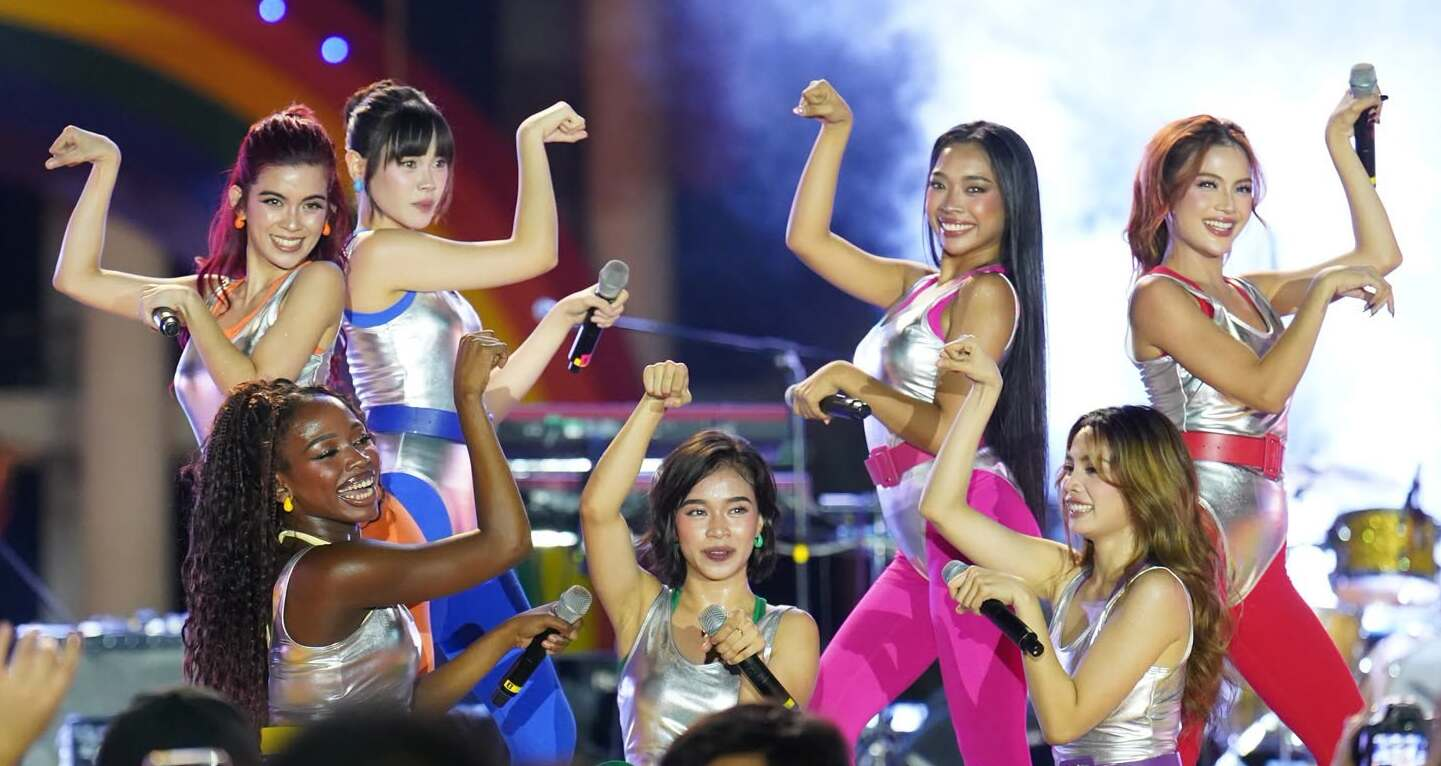
- Baby Dolls in June 2026

Background information
- Origin: Philippines
- Genres: P-pop; novelty; pop rock
- Years active: 2023–present
- Label: StarPop
- Members: Arianne Dela Cruz; Chole Florendo; Johaira Moris; Juby Sabino; Jelai Ahamil; Eriel Reyes; Ina Ortega
- Past members: Mary Delle Cascabel; Kim Dueñas

Baby Dolls are a Filipino girl group formed in 2023 through the ABS-CBN noontime variety show It's Showtime. They originally had nine members who were contestants on "Girl on Fire" and "Sexy Babe", segments of Showtime. With seven members, they debuted as recording artists via the extended play (EP) ZoomBaby Dolls, released under StarPop. Marketed as a novelty EP, ZoomBaby's songs are also said to contain pop, rock, and electronic elements. The EP received a positive review from music magazine The Flying Lugaw, which called it "one of the most sonically adventurous debut records in P-pop history".

ZoomBaby contains two singles, the surf rock track "Ikembot Mo" (lit. 'Wiggle It') and the doo-wop-influenced bubblegum song "Oooh Lala Baby". Baby Dolls were officially declared as a P-pop act in the July 17 episode of It's Showtime. In August, "Oooh Lala Baby" became their first entry into Billboard's Philippines Hot 100 chart, debuting at number 96. In September, the group released a new single titled "Meme", described as a pop, surf rock, and novelty song containing electric guitars and synth horns. They also announced their first concert, Baby Dolls: Ooh La Live sa (lit. 'at') Skydome, in the same month.

Multiple sources have identified the group's music as retro-inspired. The Visayan magazine Kasing2 said that Baby Dolls' discography largely consists of pop and pop rock songs inspired by music from the 1950s and 1960s.

== History ==
=== 2023: Formation, It's Showtime, musical ventures ===
On May 8, 2023, It's Showtime officially introduced the Baby Dolls as its in-house dance group. They performed daily on the show. The original lineup consisted of nine members who competed on Showtime's "Girl on Fire" and "Sexy Babe" segments. After years of performing for Showtime, the group signed to StarPop, a subsidiary of ABS-CBN Music. Baby Dolls trained under Rox Santos before their musical debut. In 2026, they debuted as recording artists with seven members: Arianne Dela Cruz, Chole Florendo, Eriel Reyes, Ina Ortega, Jelai Ahamil, Johaira Moris and Juby Sabino.

On March 27 that year, Baby Dolls released their debut extended play (EP) titled ZoomBaby Dolls. The EP received a positive review from music magazine The Flying Lugaw, in which writer Julienne Loreto praised its blend of pop, rock, and electronic sounds. They called ZoomBaby "one of the most sonically adventurous debut records in P-pop history". It contains five tracks, including two singles: surf rock track "Ikembot Mo" (lit. 'Wiggle It') and doo-wop-influenced bubblegum song "Oooh Lala Baby". Both of them are covers of songs from the Vhong Navarro film Da Possessed (2014). Another track on the record, "Dulce Tirah Tirah", is a remake of the 2007 song of the same name by Blanktape and Diorap.

The EP was also commercially successful, with its singles going viral according to the Manila Standard. In the week of August 1, Baby Dolls made their debut on Billboard's Philippines Hot 100 chart with "Oooh Lala Baby", entering at number 96. In June, the group made a surprise appearance at the Billboard Philippines event P-pop Unite: The Convention, performing "Oohh Lala Baby". They were officially declared as a P-pop act in the July 17 episode of It's Showtime.

On September 3, the group released the single "Meme", described as a novelty, pop, and surf rock song with choreography that references different dance styles across generations such as cha-cha and disco. Amid its release, Baby Dolls were reportedly receiving criticism for their vocal abilities and perceived reliance on cover versions. Some people also questioned whether the group could sustain the momentum they gained from their previous singles' virality. The song received a moderately positive review from the Visayan magazine Kasing2, with writer Samantha Radaza complimenting the group's continued use of the surf genre but believed that the electric guitars were overpowered by the song's synth horns. She also said that "Meme" showcased the Baby Dolls' singing skills in ways that their previous releases failed to do, praising Johaira's "powerhouse" performance especially. Later in the month, Baby Dolls announced their first concert Baby Dolls: Ooh La sa (lit. 'at') Skydome, to be held on November 8 at SM North EDSA in Quezon City, Philippines. On November 6, a music video for "Meme" was released, which earned comparisons to Barbie (2023).

== Artistry ==
"Dulce Tirah Tirah"
An 18-second sample of "Dulce Tirah Tirah", a track from Baby Dolls' debut EP ZoomBaby Dolls. It has been described as an electroclash song with elements of punk and hyperpop.

"Meme"
A 19-second sample of "Meme", a 2026 single by Baby Dolls. A twangy electric guitar line characteristic of the surf rock genre can be heard, as well as synth horns.

Baby Dolls are a P-pop group mainly marketed as a novelty act, though their songs have also been described as several other genres by music journalists: bubblegum pop, electroclash, electropop, electronic rock, and surf rock. Doo-wop, metal, punk, house, and hyperpop were also identified as some of the influences in their debut EP Zoombaby Dolls.

Multiple sources have also characterized the group's music as "old-school" or "nostalgic". Specifically, a review in The Flying Lugaw opined that Baby Dolls and Mei Mei—another P-pop girl group marketed as a novelty act—were both "heavily indebted" to girl groups from the 1960s such as The Marvelettes. Kasing2's Samantha Radaza said that a significant amount of Baby Dolls' discography is pop and pop rock inspired by music from the 1950s and 1960s, similar to the soundtrack of the 2013 American musical film Teen Beach Movie. She added that Baby Dolls' 1950s/1960s-inspired sound, particularly the surf rock elements, could potentially set them apart from other pop artists who mainly draw inspiration from the 1980s and Y2K.

== Members ==
=== Current members ===
The list below uses a Mega article as the source.

- Arianne Dela Cruz – (2023–present)
- Chole Florendo – (2023–present)
- Johaira Moris – (2023–present)
- Juby Sabino – (2023–present)
- Jelai Ahamil – (2023–present)
- Eriel Reyes – (2023–present)
- Ina Ortega – (2023–present)

=== Former members ===
- Mary Delle Cascabel
- Kim Dueñas

== Discography ==
=== Extended plays ===
Title	Album details
ZoomBaby Dolls	Released: March 27, 2026; Label: StarPop; Formats: Digital download, streaming

=== Singles ===
Title	Year	Album	Ref(s)
"Ikembot Mo"	2026	ZoomBaby Dolls	
"Oooh Lala Baby"	2026	ZoomBaby Dolls	
"Meme"	2026	Non-album single	

== Concerts ==
Year	Title	Details	Notes	Ref.
2026	Babydolls: Ooh La Live Sa Skydome	Date: November 8, 2026; Venue: SM North EDSA Skydome	First headlining concert	

== Television ==
Year	Title	Role	Notes	Ref.
2023–present	It's Showtime	Themselves	Series regulars	
2023	ASAP	Themselves	Guests	
2023	Rise and Shine Pilipinas	Themselves	Guests	
2026	All Out Sundays	Themselves	Guests	
2026	Family Feud	Themselves	Guests	

== Awards and nominations ==
Award	Year	Category	Recipient(s)	Result	Ref.
Filipino Music Awards	2026	Breakthrough Artist of the Year	Baby Dolls	Nominated	
Filipino Music Awards	2026	Pop Song of the Year	"Oooh Lala Baby"	Nominated	
Filipino Music Awards	2026	People's Choice – Song of the Year	"Oooh Lala Baby"	Nominated	
P-pop Music Awards	2026	Song of the Year	"Oooh Lala Baby"	Nominated	
P-pop Music Awards	2026	New Group Artist of the Year	Baby Dolls	Nominated	
P-pop Music Awards	2026	P-pop Potential Award	Baby Dolls	Won	
