= ZoomBaby Dolls =

2026 EP by Baby Dolls

EP by Baby Dolls
- Released: March 27, 2026
- Studio: ABS-CBN Music Studios
- Genres: P-pop; novelty; rock; electronic; OPM
- Length: 16:12
- Label: StarPop
- Producers: Christian Martinez; Rox Santos

Alternative cover
- Zoombaby Dolls (Christmas Remix) edition

Singles from ZoomBaby Dolls
- 1. "Ikembot Mo" Released: March 27, 2026; 2. "Oooh Lala Baby" Released: June 8, 2026

ZoomBaby Dolls (stylized in all lowercase) is the debut extended play (EP) by the Filipino girl group Baby Dolls, who serve as the resident all-female dance group of the ABS-CBN midday variety show It's Showtime. The EP was released on March 27, 2026, through StarPop, a sub-label of ABS-CBN Music. Comprising five tracks, the project marks the group's transition from television dancers to recording artists. It features themes heavily centered around fitness, daily wellness routines, and active lifestyles.

The EP viral breakout single "Ikembot Mo" and "Oooh Lala Baby" drove significant social media traction in the Philippines and entered the domestic viral charts. The EP is marketed as a novelty record, though music magazine The Flying Lugaw noted that its tracks also contain rock and electronic influences.

== Background and concept ==
The seven members of Baby Dolls—Arianne Dela Cruz, Chole Florendo, Johaira Moris, Juby Sabino, Jelai Ahamil, Eriel Reyes, and Ina Ortega—were originally selected by ABS-CBN producers from It's Showtime competitive segments, namely "Girl on Fire" and "Sexy Babe".

Following their established residency as daily dancers on the variety show, ABS-CBN Music transitioned the group into commercial recording. Inspired by physical workout soundtracks and high-energy aerobics, the concept of ZoomBaby Dolls was developed to encourage listeners to embrace physical wellness and confidence. According to the label, the music was strategically curated to accompany daily fitness routines and "glow-ups" while retaining the high-tempo, synchronized dance styles for which the group was known.

== Promotion and release ==
The EP was officially released across all major global digital download and streaming platforms on March 27, 2026. To promote the extended play, Baby Dolls performed live on the multi-platform variety musical program ASAP on March 28, 2026. The group additionally initiated a localized promotional campaign consisting of zumba tours across key cities in Metro Manila, including Quezon City and Valenzuela, alongside stops throughout Rizal province to engage directly with local fitness and dance communities.

=== Singles ===
- "Ikembot Mo" was released as the EP's lead promotional key track alongside the album launch. Composed and produced by veteran songwriter Christian Martinez, the song went viral on TikTok, accumulating over one million dance challenge video entries, which pushed it to peak at number 16 on the Spotify Philippines Viral Songs Chart and number 40 on Instagram Music.
- "Oooh Lala Baby" was introduced as the EP's second official single. The group debuted the song's official choreography live during a broadcast segment of It's Showtime in mid-May 2026 to capitalize on the EP's ongoing viral momentum. The song is a remake of "Da Vhong Song", performed by Vhong Navarro that was used in Da Possessed (2014).

== Composition ==
ZoomBaby Dolls consists of five upbeat tracks driven by fast tempos, electronic beats, and repetitive hooks. Producer Christian Martinez and arranger Albert Tamayo served as key creative contributors to the project. Rock influences have also been noted, with the single "Ikembot Mo" (lit. 'Wiggle It' being identified as a surf rock song with twangy guitars and Beach Boys-like harmonies. Other tracks on the EP, such as "Clap Clap Alright" and "Dulce Tirah Tirah", were described as electronic rock and punk-infused electroclash respectively. "Kitang Kita" is said to contain "hard electropop beats" with traces of house, while the single "Oooh Lala Baby" is said to have a doo wop influence.

== Personnel ==
Credits adapted from ABS-CBN Music and StarPop digital releases.

- Baby Dolls — lead vocals
- Rox Santos — executive producer (StarPop)
- Christian Martinez — songwriter, producer
- Albert Tamayo — arranger

== Track listing ==
All of the tracks on ZoomBaby Dolls and ZoomBaby Dolls (Christmas Remix) were produced by Christian Martinez and co-written by Martinez, Rox Santos, Jimmy Antiporda, Arlen "BlankTape" Mandangan, Cielito Diola and Jonathan Manalo.

ZoomBaby Dolls track listing
No.	Title	Writer(s)	Producer(s)	Length
1.	"Clap Clap Clap Alright!"	Rox Santos; Jonathan Manalo	Christian Martinez	3:09
2.	"Ikembot Mo"	Martinez	Martinez	3:14
3.	"Kitang Kita"	Jimmy Antiporda	Martinez	3:40
4.	"Oooh Lala Baby"	Martinez	Martinez	3:04
5.	"Dulce Tirah Tirah"	Arlen "BlankTape" Mandangan; Cielito "Diorap" Diola	Martinez	3:06

ZoomBaby Dolls (Christmas Remix)
No.	Title	Length
1.	"Clap Clap Clap Alright! (Christmas Remix)"	3:05
2.	"Ikembot Mo (Christmas Remix)"	3:14
3.	"Kitang Kita (Christmas Remix)"	3:39
4.	"Dulce Tirah Tirah (Christmas Remix)"	3:06
5.	"Baby Dolls Christmas Medley (Nonstop Remix)"	15:51
Total length:		28:55

== Release history ==
Release date history
Region	Date	Format(s)	Edition(s)	Label	Ref.
Various	March 27, 2026	Digital download; streaming	Standard	StarPop	
Various	September 25, 2026	Digital download; streaming	Christmas Remix	StarPop	
