= It's Showtime (Philippine TV program) =

Philippine television variety show

- Title card since April 6, 2024 (Note: Logo used since 2022)
- Also known as: Showtime
- Genre: Variety show
- Created by: ABS-CBN Corporation; Bobet Vidanes
- Developed by: Bobet Vidanes
- Written by: Vanessa Alex Balite; Waldo Bautista; Isa Reyes
- Directed by: Bobet Vidanes (2009–2020); Boyet Baldemor (2020–2021); John Prats (2021); Jon Moll (since 2021); Arnel Natividad (since 2025)
- Presented by: Vice Ganda; Vhong Navarro; Anne Curtis; Karylle; Jhong Hilario; Jugs Jugueta; Teddy Corpuz; Ryan Bang; Amy Perez; Ion Perez; Jackie Gonzaga; Kim Chiu; Ogie Alcasid; Lassy Marquez; MC "Muah" Calaquian; Cianne Dominguez; Darren Espanto; Brent Manalo; Ralph de Leon
- Narrated by: Peter Musñgi (since 2009) (Note: Main narrator for introductions and promotional teasers used by ABS-CBN (2009–2020), Kapamilya Channel (since 2020), GTV and GMA (since 2023), and ALLTV (since 2024), and sponsors when either the commercial break starts or formerly before the break bumper is shown leading to TV network advertisements as a sign that program resume was near.); Jefferson Utanes (2009–2023) (Note: Narrator for sponsors, which airs before commercial break.); Jeremy Domingo (2012–2026) (Note: Narrator for promotional teasers used by Studio 23 in 2012, Jeepney TV from June 2018 to April 2024 and ALLTV from June 2024 to January 2026.); Lloyd Oliver "Tiny" Corpuz (since 2020) (Note: Narrator for promotional teasers used by A2Z.); Mitch "Super Mitch" Amurao (2022–2023) (Note: Narrator for promotional teasers used by TV5.); Marielle Montellano (since 2024) (Note: Narrator for sponsors and some promotional segments in replacing Ramsey.); Ana Ramsey (2023–2024) (Note: Narrator for sponsors and some promotional segments in replacing Utanes; credited as Ana Katrina Ramsey.); Louise Lizano (2023–2024) (Note: Narrator for promotional teasers used by GTV.); Al Torres (2024) (Note: Narrator for promotional teasers used by GMA Network.); Weng Dela Peña (since 2025)
- Theme music composer: Angelo "DJ MOD" Macanaya
- Opening theme: "It's Showtime" (Note: Four remixes of "It's Showtime" has been used for the opening theme. The song was revised in 2020 and 2021. A new theme song was refreshed on July 16, 2022 since the debut of the show on TV5. The lyrics was later reverted back on April 6, 2024, but retained the additional lyrics since it debuted on GMA Network.)
- Country of origin: Philippines
- Original language: Filipino

Production
- Executive producers: Eugenio Lopez III (2009–2013); Charo Santos-Concio (2013–2016); Carlo L. Katigbak (since 2016); Cory V. Vidanes; Laurenti M. Dyogi; Luis L. Andrada
- Producers: Rose Casala; Katrina Genova-Bitara
- Production locations: ABS-CBN Broadcasting Center, Quezon City, Philippines: Studio 2 (2009–2012); Studio 3 (since 2012); Studio 10 (occasional; 2020–2025); Hilton Clark Sun Valley Resort, Mabalacat, Pampanga (2021)
- Editors: Alphonse Dayao; Kerwin de Mesa; Malvin Flores
- Camera setup: Multi-camera
- Running time: 150 minutes
- Production company: ABS-CBN Studios

Original release
- Network: ABS-CBN
- Release: October 24, 2009 – January 28, 2012
- Release: February 6, 2012 – May 5, 2020
- Network: Kapamilya Channel (Note: Following the cease-and-desist order issued on May 5, 2020 and the franchise denied on July 10, the show moved to Kapamilya Channel, with simulcast on A2Z (since October 10, 2020), Jeepney TV (June 11, 2018–April 5, 2024), TV5 (July 16, 2022–June 30, 2023), GTV (July 1, 2023–December 31, 2024), GMA Network (since April 6, 2024) and All TV (since June 17, 2024).)
- Release: June 13, 2020 – present

Related
- It's Showtime Indonesia

It's Showtime (formerly known as Showtime) is a Philippine television noontime variety show broadcast by ABS-CBN and Kapamilya Channel. Originally hosted by Vhong Navarro, Anne Curtis, Kim Atienza, Jugs Jugueta, Teddy Corpuz, and Vice Ganda, the show premiered on October 24, 2009, on the network's PrimeTanghali block. Navarro, Curtis, Jugueta, Corpuz, Vice Ganda, Karylle, Jhong Hilario, Ryan Bang, Amy Perez, Ion Perez, Jackie Gonzaga, Kim Chiu, Ogie Alcasid, MC "Muah" Calaquian, Lassy Marquez, Cianne Dominguez, Darren Espanto, Brent Manalo and Ralph de Leon currently serve as the hosts.

== History ==
=== 2009–2012: Pre-noontime era ===
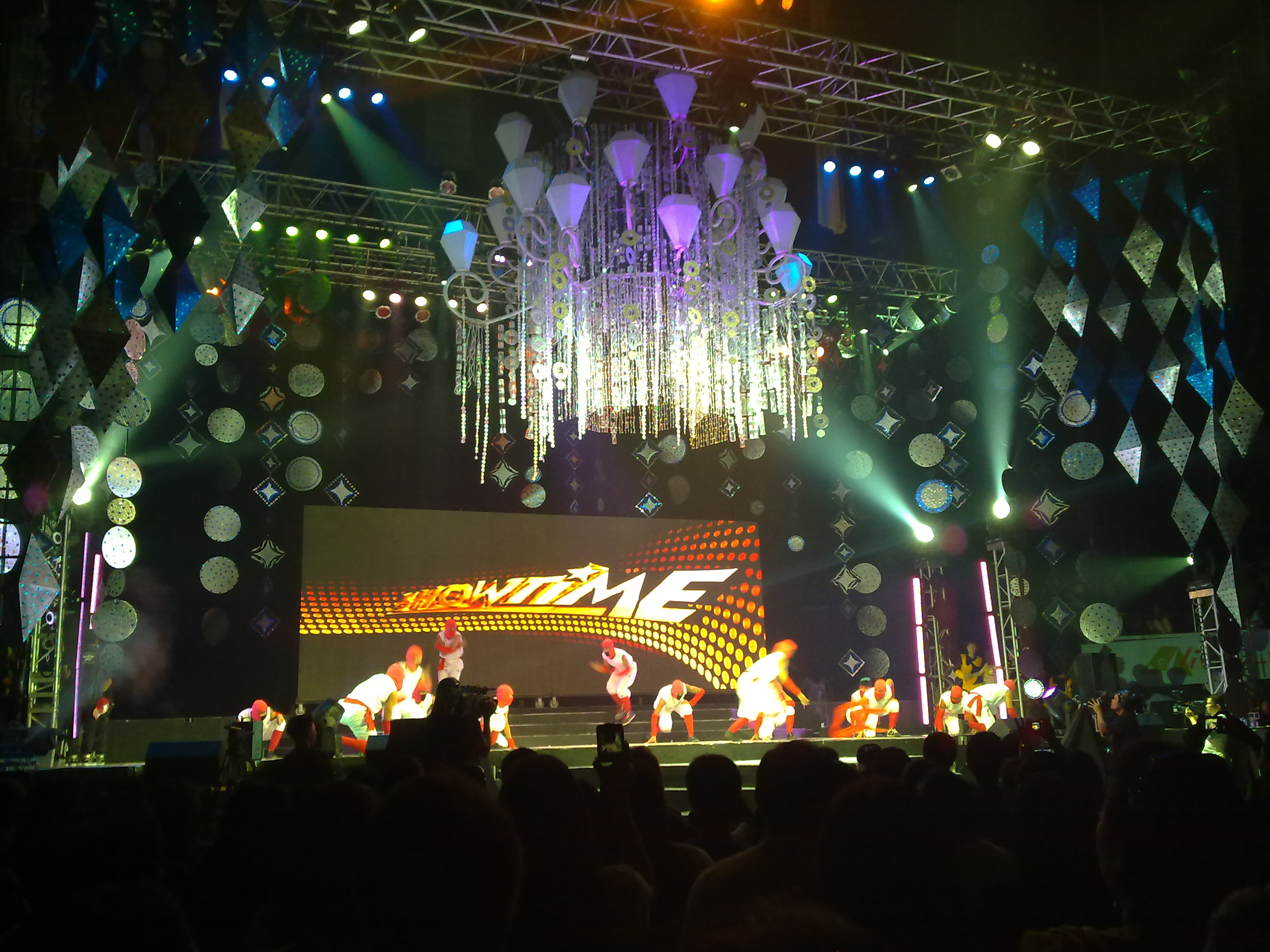
Showtime at the Araneta Coliseum, 2010

First announced on October 7, 2009, It's Showtime premiered as a talent competition on October 24, 2009, under the name Showtime. The show aired Monday through Saturday during the timeslot before Wowowee, and replacing Pilipinas, Game Ka Na Ba?, which aired as lead-in for the network's noontime shows. The show's original hosts include Vhong Navarro, Anne Curtis, Kim Atienza, Jugs Jugueta and Teddy Corpuz while Vice Ganda served as a hurado (resident permanent judge).

Before the October 7 announcement, however, the show was supposed to air in Saturday primetime consisting of 13 taped episodes.

For the first four seasons of the show, three groups of 2-25 members, of all ages, performed each episode. One member from each group would give a 20-second introduction before their performance.

The hurados and the studio audience assessed each of the performances and give the group from a score ranging from 1 to 10. The scores were calculated as the average.

The winning group of each episode advanced to the weekly finals held on Saturdays. Winning groups then competed for a spot in the monthly finals held at the end of each month. The winning group of each monthly final earns a spot in the grand finale competition.

Losing groups from weekly or monthly finals could be selected for the 'wildcard week' event, where groups compete against each other in the same, but accelerated, format. The winner of the "wildcard week" gets to advance to the grand finale.

Aside from the talent competition, Showtime also featured mini-segments that offers cash prizes to the studio audiences.

Showtime was also notable for the 'Hurado or Burado' segment, allowing viewers to vote via SMS to evict a judge. Weekly, the judge with the highest percentage of eviction votes was replaced by a newcomer the following week.

The classic Showtime format was revived during the show's 10th Anniversary Special on October 1, 2019.

Showtime season overview
Season	Title	Original Release		No. of Finalists	Winner	Runner-up
Season	Title	Premiere date	Finale date	No. of Finalists	Winner	Runner-up
1	—N/a	October 24, 2009	July 24, 2010	11	XB Gensan	Philippine Islands Assassin
2	—N/a	July 26, 2010	December 18, 2010	10	Laoag City Gymnastics Group	Xtreme 24/7
3	—N/a	December 20, 2010	May 14, 2011	12	True Colors	Vision 20
4	—N/a	May 16, 2011	December 10, 2011	14	Astig Pinoy	—N/a
5	Campus Clash	January 2, 2012	January 27, 2012	6	CCP Bobcats	ABE Dance Artists
6	Inter-Town Edition	February 6, 2012	April 28, 2012	8	Bacolod Masskara	Lahing Anda La Castellana Bailes de Luces
7	Sampu-Sample	October 1, 2019	October 26, 2019	8	J-Crisis	Gingoog Pride

=== 2010–2011; 2012–present: As a noontime show ===
From October 2010 to February 2011, Showtime occupied the timeslot of Pilipinas Win Na Win. Following the latter's cancellation on December 31, 2010, Showtime transitioned into the primary noontime slot. After that, the show would return to its original morning timeslot to make way for Happy Yipee Yehey!; the same day, February 12, 2011, also featured the addition of new hosts Billy Crawford and Karylle.

==== It's Showtime ====
Logo used from 2012 to 2022

On January 28, 2012, Showtime aired a special subtitled "Thank you, Showtime" to commemorate the ending of its two-year competition format with an impartial farewell. ABS-CBN later released teasers featuring the 'I-T-S Mascots', as these mascots were a symbol of the new era of the show. These mascots later on, became the show's placeholder for the letters: I, T and S putting them above the now known logo. The show resumed broadcast on February 6, 2012, under the rebranded It's Showtime name and airing on the 11:30 am to 2:30 pm timeslot, Mondays to Saturdays, replacing Happy Yipee Yehey!, returning ABS-CBN's noontime slot's dominance by continuously occupying from the said date that was not seen since the end of the third and final 2010 iteration of Wowowee without Willie Revillame 1 year and 7 months earlier on July 30, 2010, as Pilipinas Win Na Win and the latter failed to reach Wowowee's popularity by having both low ratings, and following the 2010–2011 airing of Showtime on 12pm slot which worked.

The show then added new hosts Jhong Hilario, Ryan Bang, Coleen Garcia and Eric Tai. Similarly, ABS-CBN's UHF channel Studio 23 (which later rebranded as ABS-CBN Sports and Action in January 2014) which are now both defunct and CgeTV acquired simulcast rights during the first few months of its relaunch, while YouTube later added its own spinoff channel Showtime Online Universe in January 2018 (they started a trial run from August 2016 until then as 'It's Showtime Online'), alongside three digital programs And I Thank You, Hashtag Roadtrip and Donna What To Do. The Showtime Online Universe received a Silver Creator Award in January 2019.

When the show returned, It's Showtime brought back its original competition format as a special segment while launching new segments for both audience (Sine Mo 'To!, Pitik Bulag, Singing V, Arte Mo!) and public viewers where they can win prizes and cash (It's Call-Time!, Anne-Saya sa Japan!).

The show went with addition of new hosts in the second half of the decade, with Amy Perez and Mariel Rodriguez in January 2016, and Nadine Lustre and James Reid in May 2017. Before 2019 ended, it was announced that Crawford, Garcia, Tai, Reid, Lustre, Atienza, and Joey Marquez had already departed from the show.

==== Second decade (2020–present) ====
On March 10, 2020, It's Showtime temporarily stopped admitting live audiences in response to the government's declaration of a public health emergency due to the COVID-19 pandemic in the Philippines. Following the government's announcement of a community quarantine in Metro Manila to curb the spread of COVID-19 on March 15, 2020, the show's production was temporarily suspended. During this period, It's Showtime broadcast a combination of episode replays and live episodes conducted via Zoom.

The show was later on temporarily renamed to 'Best Of Showtime' featuring 2012-2013 episode segments (Sine Mo 'To, Tandang Pananong?') and funny moment compilations of hosts or segment contestants (Miss Q and A, etc.). As part of the network's temporary programming changes, the program's timeslot was shortened on April 29, 2020. Subsequently, on May 5, 2020, It's Showtime, along with other ABS-CBN programs, stopped its broadcast, in response to the National Telecommunications Commission's issuance of a cease and desist order to ABS-CBN's free-to-air stations, citing the expiration of the network's 25-year franchise.

On June 13, 2020, the show resumed its broadcast with a shortened 150-minute timeslot on pay television network Kapamilya Channel, owned and operated by ABS-CBN Corporation. The show is also simulcast on Jeepney TV and streams online on Facebook and YouTube via Showtime Online Ü and Kapamilya Online Live. After serving as KapareWHO cast member and as resident dancer respectively, "Kuya Escort" Ion Perez and "Ate Girl" Jackie Gonzaga were promoted to co-hosts of the show. On September 28, 2020, Kim Chiu, a guest co-host from the previous years, have been officially added to the show as a regular host.

On October 10, 2020, It's Showtime celebrated its return to free-to-air television via A2Z under airtime leasing between ABS-CBN and religious broadcaster, ZOE Broadcasting Network. However, director Bobet Vidanes left the show in November 2020 after working as the show's main director for eleven years. Boyet Baldemor took responsibility for the directorial duties of the show's continuation.

On March 16, 2021, Vice Ganda announced during the segment Tawag ng Tanghalan segment that the show would move to a new studio soon.

From March 18 to April 10, 2021, It's Showtime temporarily suspended their live productions due to the surge of COVID-19 cases in the Greater Manila Area caused by the SARS-CoV-2 Alpha variant. The show resumed new episodes on April 12, 2021, airing three pre-taped episodes (this includes past Holy Week episodes) before resuming their live episodes on April 15, 2021.

On April 12, 2021, Jhong Hilario temporarily left the show to take care of his partner and newborn baby.

On May 29, 2021, following the launching of the show's new segment "ReINA Ng Tahanan", the program has been co-directed by John Prats.

From August 7 to 21, 2021, It's Showtime temporarily aired from Hilton Clark Sun Valley Resort in Clark Freeport Zone, Pampanga while Metro Manila was placed under enhanced community quarantine in light of another COVID-19 surge caused by the SARS-CoV-2 Delta variant.

On October 2, 2021, Ogie Alcasid temporarily joined It's Showtime as guest co-host while Vice Ganda, Kim Chiu, Karylle and Ion Perez were on temporary leave until he became a main host on November 13. Jon Moll replaced Bobet Vidanes as the show's permanent director.

From January 6 to 15, 2022, It's Showtime temporarily suspended their live productions on a 10-day break due to the surge of COVID-19 cases in the country caused by the SARS-CoV-2 Omicron variant until its resumption on January 17.

On May 28, 2022, Anne Curtis returned to It's Showtime after two years of hiatus. One week later, on June 4, 2022, Jhong Hilario returned to the show by disguising as a Tawag ng Tanghalan contestant, surprising all hosts.

A female dance segment, Girl on Fire, aired from October 2022 to February 18, 2023, with Jackie Gonzaga taking her first role as the main host. A matchmaking segment called Expecially for You premiered on December 4, 2023.

Meanwhile, the classic Showtime segment It's Showdown premiered on October 30, 2023, followed by new games such as MeCHOOSE-MeCHOOSE on November 18, 2023, and Act Lang 'To on January 6, 2025. The revival and fourth season of the impersonation segment Kalokalike premiered on September 2, 2024, and a game show titled Throwbox premiered on September 7, 2024. The second season of the beauty pageant competition Showtime Sexy Babe and mystery game show Hide and Sing both premiered on January 20, 2025; Sine Mo 'To later returned on March 4, 2025.

Segments involving the Showtime Kids premiered starting in 2023, beginning with Isip Bata on February 20, 2023, which marked the debut of the Showtime Kids, followed by the revival of Mini Miss U on June 19, 2023, which ended on October 30, 2023. KaraoKids premiered on January 6, 2024, Showing Bulilit on April 29, 2024, Bata-Bata Pick! on July 30, 2024, Hulanino on January 27, 2025, and Ansabe on February 11, 2025.

==== 2022–2023: TV5 simulcast ====
On July 6, 2022, according to a report from MJ Marfori of TV5's flagship newscast Frontline Pilipinas, it was announced that It's Showtime would have a back-to-back collaboration with TV5's noontime show Tropang LOL, formerly known as Lunch Out Loud. Tropang LOL aired at 11 am until 12:45 pm, serving as a pre-programming to It's Showtime, which aired in a shortened timeslot from 12:45 pm to 3 pm. This is the latest ABS-CBN-produced program to be simulcasted on TV5 alongside ASAP Natin To, FPJ: Da King movie block, Magandang Buhay and ABS-CBN's Primetime Bida weeknight evening block.

On July 16, 2022, coinciding with their simulcast debut on TV5, the program refurbished its title card and opening theme song. The live studio audience also returned for the first time since the beginning of the pandemic, making it the first variety show on Philippine TV to do so. While Studio 3 was on undergoing renovations, the show temporarily utilized Studio 10, which is used for ASAP Natin 'To, until July 23 when they returned to its home studio two days later with a brand new club-themed set.

On May 1, 2023, following the conclusion of Tropang LOL after nine months, It's Showtime returned to its original 12:00 noon timeslot with a three-hour airtime. Not long after, TV5 announced its co-production venture with Tito Sotto, Vic Sotto, and Joey de Leon where they would air their noontime show later known under the placeholder title E.A.T. (now replaced by Eat Bulaga!) on the noontime slot previously occupied by It's Showtime. TV5 offered the 4:30 pm to 6:30 pm time slot to ABS-CBN for It's Showtime which the latter respectfully declined. ABS-CBN and TV5 then separately announced that It's Showtime would end its simulcast on TV5 on June 30.

==== 2023–2024: GTV simulcast ====
On June 20, 2023, ABS-CBN and GMA Network (Note: Announced through GTV's social media accounts.) announced on their respective social media accounts that It's Showtime would simulcast through GMA's sister network, GTV beginning on July 1. A contract signing between the executives of ABS-CBN and GMA was held at Seda Vertis North on June 28, with former guest co-hosts Iya Villania and Robi Domingo hosting the said event. From September to November 2023, the simulcast of It's Showtime on GTV was temporarily limited to 2 hours every Tuesday, Wednesday and Friday as it made way for the network's live broadcast of NCAA Season 99.

It's Showtime temporarily stopped its broadcast from October 13 to 27, 2023, to serve a 12-day suspension order imposed by the Movie and Television Review and Classification Board (MTRCB). In its place, It's Your Lucky Day was aired. Upon its return on October 28, It's Showtime aired from 11:30 am to 2:30 pm every Monday to Friday and 12:00 noon to 3:00 pm every Saturday. Its time slot was later reverted to 12:00 noon to 2:30 pm from Monday to Saturday. GTV's simulcast silently ended on December 31, 2024, as It's Showtime continues to air on GMA Network and AMBS-owned All TV.

==== 2024–present: GMA and ALLTV2 simulcast; return to former frequencies ====
On March 18, 2024, during the show's airing, a mysterious teaser popped out before commercial break stating: "Good News, Madlang People, Abangan!" (transl. Good News, Madlang People, Coming Soon!) featuring the 'I-T-S Mascots' alongside with a small yellow and blue heart. Later on, ABS-CBN and It's Showtime's social media accounts posted a video featuring a reveal that would take place on air via Facebook and YouTube. Two days later, a media event where ABS-CBN and GMA Network signed a contract announced that It's Showtime would extend its simulcast to the latter's main channel, as well as on GMA Pinoy TV and Kapuso Stream. The contract was signed at GMA Network Center Studio 7 that afternoon, with Villania and Domingo reprising their hosting roles from the previous contract signing event. Because of this, the program's simulcast on Jeepney TV ended on April 5.

It's Showtime debuted on GMA Network on April 6, 2024, while retaining its simulcast on its sister channel GTV (until December 31, after one year and six months). It took over the timeslot of its former rival Tahanang Pinakamasaya, TAPE Inc.'s final noontime program on GMA during its 29-year run on the network. As a result, its opening theme reverted the pre-2020 lyrics but retained the additional lyrics after its move following its debut.

On June 17, 2024, the show silently began its simulcast on All TV, marking its return to channels 2 and 16 in Mega Manila and regional channels previously held by ABS-CBN until 2020. This occurred nearly two months after ABS-CBN Corporation and All TV's owner, Advanced Media Broadcasting System, signed content agreements to air ABS-CBN programs on All TV.

==== 2025: Sale of studio to Ayala Land ====
On February 27, 2025, ABS-CBN announced in a disclosure to the Philippine Stock Exchange that it would sell most of the Broadcast Center to Ayala Land for redevelopment, pending regulatory approval, where it will consolidate its operations along with its already built soundstages, post-production and production facility at the Horizon PEZA IT Park in San Jose del Monte, Bulacan and retaining 1.4 hectares (3.5 acres) of the property, the ELJ Communications Center. The studio of It's Showtime was included in the sale. The deal will take effect in December 2026.

== Hosts ==
Current hosts
Main hosts

- Vhong Navarro (since 2009)
- Anne Curtis (since 2009)
- Vice Ganda (since 2009)
- Karylle (since 2011)
- Jhong Hilario (since 2012)

Co-hosts

- Teddy Corpuz (since 2009)
- Jugs Jugueta (since 2009)
- Ryan Bang (since 2012)
- Amy Perez (since 2016)
- Ion Perez (since 2018)
- Jackie Gonzaga (since 2018)
- Kim Chiu (since 2020) (Note: Currently on hiatus.)
- Ogie Alcasid (since 2021)
- MC "Muah" Calaquian (since 2022)
- Lassy Marquez (since 2022)
- Cianne Dominguez (since 2022)
- Darren Espanto (since 2024)
- Brent Manalo (since 2026)
- Ralph de Leon (since 2026)

=== Featuring ===
- It's Showtime Kids (also called as Batang Cute-Po and/or KaraoKids) (since 2023)
  - Felix Argus Aspiras (from Isip Bata)
  - Arianah Kelsey "Yes Girl" Lasam (from Mini Miss U 2023; grand winner)
  - Briseis Ericka Quijano (from Mini Miss U 2023)
  - Enicka Xaria Orbe (from Mini Miss U 2023)
  - Imogen Cantong (from Isip Bata)
  - Jaze Capili (from Isip Bata)
  - Kiarah Ayesha Bajeta (from Hulanino)
  - Princess Kathryn "Kulot" Caponpon (from Isip Bata)
- Baby Dolls (since 2023)
  - Chole Florendo (from Girl on Fire)
  - Ina Ortega (from Girl on Fire)
  - Eriel Reyes (from Girl on Fire)
  - Arianne dela Cruz (from Girl on Fire)
  - Jelai Ahamil (from Girl on Fire)
  - Jubilyn "Juby" Sabino (from Showtime Sexy Babe)
  - Johaira Moris (from Showtime Sexy Babe)

=== Showtime Online Ü hosts ===
The following are the current hosts of the show's online show, Showtime Online Ü:

- AC Soriano (since 2023)
- Anne Tenorio (from Tawag ng Tanghalan; since 2019)
- Anthony Castillo (from Tawag ng Tanghalan; since 2021)
- Eris Aragoza (from BidaMan; since 2019)
- Jannah Alanise Chua (from Expecially for You; since 2024)
- Jennifer Catayong a.k.a. Nicki Morena (from Kalokalike: Face 2, grand winner; since 2023) (Note: Nicki was on an extended hiatus throughout 2025, but made a virtual appearance during the online show’s ninth anniversary celebration on August 27, 2025. She later made a surprise return to It’s Showtime on August 8, 2026.)
- JM Dela Cerna (from Tawag ng Tanghalan; Duets grand winner; since 2021)
- Lorraine Galvez (from Tawag ng Tanghalan; since 2021)
- Mackie Empuerto (from Tawag ng Tanghalan Kids; since 2024)
- Marielle Montellano (from Tawag ng Tanghalan; Duets grand winner; since 2021)
- Sheena Belarmino (from Tawag ng Tanghalan Kids; since 2024)
- Wize Estabillo (from BidaMan; since 2019)
- Zeah Nestle Pala (from Showtime Sexy Babe 2025; grand winner; since 2025)

== Show segments ==
As of June 15, 2026, the show currently airs two segments: Laro Laro Pick and Miss Q and A.

=== Annual/Current segments ===
==== Magpasikat ====
Magpasikat (lit. 'Show-Off') is the annual talent competition for all the hosts of It's Showtime. The performances are evaluated by a special panel of hurados (judges). It is usually held either a week before the show's anniversary date, October 24, or during the week itself. Since 2025, the special revised its format to emphasis on entertainment, combined with public service and audience outreach in ways such as special performances, themed game show editions, and an awards segment.

The 17th and current edition of Magpasikat, subtitled DisiSyete and titled Dis is Ur Show: DisiSyete, was held from October 19 to 24, 2026.

==== Miss Q and A ====
The fourth season of the beauty pageant competition Miss Q and A, subtitled Reyna Talak-era 2026, premiered on June 15, 2026.

Miss Q & A first premiered in July 10, 2017 and has since produced three seasons, the most recent of which aired in 2022 under the title Kween of the Multibeks. Inspired by the question-and-answer segment of traditional beauty pageants, Miss Q & A primarily features gay men, transgender women, queer individuals, and pageant veterans. Unlike conventional beauty pageants, however, the competition places greater emphasis on contestants' wit, intelligence, and ability to respond effectively to questions rather than on physical appearance.

Since then, Miss Q & A has crowned three winners: Juliana Parizcova Segovia for Season 1, Mitch Montecarlo Suansane for Season 2 (InterTALAKtic 2019), and Anne Patricia Lorenzo for Season 3 (Kween of the Multibeks).

A celebrity edition of Miss Q & A, titled Miss Q & A: Celebrity Edition, was announced on October 17, 2026, alongside the second special edition of Laro Laro Pick. It is a part of It’s Showtime’s week-long 17th anniversary celebration. The edition features three celebrity divisions: straight male celebrities, female celebrities, and gay celebrities.

==== Mag-PPOP-sikat ====
Mag-PPOP-sikat (a portmanteau of magpasikat and P-pop, pronounced as mag-pop-sikat) is an upcoming Philippine reality singing competition that aims to form and launch a new P-pop boy group. Auditions for the competition commenced on June 4, 2026. The segment is scheduled to premiere in 2027.

==== Laro Laro Pick ====
Laro Laro Pick (a portmanteau of the words laro (game) and "bato bato pick", Filipino for rock paper scissors; lit. 'game, game, pick!'), originally named "The Pot", is a game show segment that premiered on August 18, 2025. (Note: Laro Laro Pick did not air on November 8, 10, December 6, 25 to 27, 29 to 31, 2025, January 17, March 30 to April 4 (due to Holy Week special programming), June 13, October 19, 21, 23, and 24, 2026.)

12 new contestants (formerly 24 contestants consisting of 20 regular players and 4 hosts or celebrity guests until Episode 211) compete in a last man standing format in each episode, all vying for a progressive jackpot starting at ₱100,000. Some themed episodes featured up to four different occupational sectors or themed characters, along with twists employed such as second chance for eliminated contestants, and a temporary increase of the jackpot in some episodes. The player of numbers were reduced to half starting from Episode 231 (June 1).

Each episode sees contestants compete in four different stages in the game where approximately half the total number of contestants are eliminated at each stage until one contestant remain, though the number of eliminated contestants varies in each game. Regular contestants are given ₱1,000 each at the start of the game. The last contestant left standing after four rounds will advance to the jackpot round. (Note: The first round will always eliminate half (12) of the 24 contestants, later 6 of 12, at random; while the fourth and final round will eliminate the remaining contestants, leaving one contestant advancing to the jackpot round. From episodes 232 to 260, however, the format was modified so that eight contestants advanced from the first round, while the remaining four were eliminated.) If all contestants are eliminated before the final round, a random draw among the eliminated contestants is conducted to determine who advances to the jackpot round. In some special episodes, however, this mechanism is replaced by a It’s Showtime host competing on behalf of a regular player, as first implemented in Episode 212 (May 9 episode).

In the jackpot round, the contestant can choose to risk their current winnings to attempt for the jackpot (POT) or take a cash buyout (LI-POT (lipat/switch)). Before making a decision, the hosts will tempt the contestants with a "cash buyout" of up to ₱50,000 or more. If the contestant decides to risk it for the jackpot, a question is then given and they must correctly answer the question with a five-second time limit (early episodes with a three-second time limit). Successfully answering the question awards the contestant the jackpot after which it resets back to ₱100,000, otherwise they forfeit all of their prize money and ₱50,000 is then added to the jackpot. If the contestant accepts the buyout, the jackpot will not be incremented, and they are given a chance to answer the final question unofficially and see if they would have been able to answer it.

If a celebrity contestant won the jackpot, it will be donated to the victims of Super Typhoon Uwan through ABS-CBN Foundation; early episodes prior to November 10, 2025, would award the prize money to a random audience member, or in some exceptional cases, may be evenly divided among up to 20 audience members. Beginning with Episode 94 (December 8, 2025), celebrity contestants play on behalf of one selected non-celebrity player for the jackpot.

To date, there have been 58 jackpot winners (three of whom won at least ₱1 million, and six of whom were recognized as joint winners): (Note: This number is always up to date by this script.)

As of November 19, 2026 (Episode 373), the segment has awarded a total of ₱22,233,000 in cash prizes.

List of Laro, Laro, Pick! jackpot winners
No.	Date won	Episode	Name & sector	Prize won	Ref.
1	August 23, 2025	6	Jan-jan; Student	₱250,000	
2	September 22, 2025	31	Khen; Factory worker	₱650,000	
3	September 24, 2025	33	Bonjing; Magkakariton (Cart-pusher)	₱150,000	
4	September 25, 2025	34	Edlyn; Rakiterang nanay (Hustling mother)	₱100,000	
5	September 30, 2025	38	Gerry; Farmer	₱200,000	
6	October 1, 2025	39	Jhaine; Manicurist	₱100,000	
7	October 2, 2025	40	Shirley; Senior citizen	₱150,000 (Note: Shirley also won ₱50,000 (from the final offer) from the hosts in addition to the ₱100,000 jackpot they would have given to her had she took the buyout.)	
8	October 23, 2025	58	Marj; Student leader	₱500,000	
9	October 24, 2025	59	Gloria; Solo parent	₱410,000 (Note: As part of the 16th anniversary episode, the hosts pledged to increase the initial ₱100,000 jackpot with another ₱300,000, making the jackpot for this episode ₱400,000. Gloria also won another ₱10,000 from Billy Crawford after her win.)	
10	October 29, 2025	63	Dulce; Mangiihaw (Barbeque vendors)	₱250,000	
11	November 6, 2025	70	Bernie; College graduate with honors	₱200,000	
12	November 15, 2025	76	Joseph; School admin staff (Guidance counselors)	₱250,000	
13	November 17, 2025	77	Guy; Senior citizen	₱100,000	
14	December 4, 2025	92	Disyang; 2025 Cebu earthquake/Typhoon Tino victim	₱1,035,000 (Note: As part of the MagPASKOsikat Special, the jackpot for the week was fixed to ₱1,000,000 (see Laro Laro Pick: MagPASKOsikat Special below).)	
15	December 5, 2025	93	Angela; Solid Showtimer from Mindanao	₱1,011,000	
16	December 11, 2025	97	Dan; Graduating college student	₱200,000	
17	December 20, 2025	105 (Note: Special Episode. For special episodes, the jackpot pot is reset to ₱100,000. If the jackpot is won, half of the prize (₱50,000) is awarded to the contestant, while the remaining half is donated to a designated beneficiary or charity on the contestant’s behalf.)	Ayesha; Showtime kid	₱100,000 (Note: Half of the prize was donated to the ABS-CBN Foundation.)	
18	December 22, 2025	106 (Note: Special Episode. This special episode featured the cast of Call Me Mother alongside foster mothers and served as a promotional event for the film. While the standard rules regarding celebrity players competing on behalf of selected contestants remained in effect, the jackpot pot was reset to ₱100,000 and, unlike other special episodes, the entire amount was awarded to the selected player rather than having half of the prize donated to charity.)	Ion & Analyn; Foster mother	₱100,000 (Note: Ion competed in the jackpot round on behalf of regular player Analyn; consequently, both are officially recognized as joint 18th jackpot winners.)	
19	December 23, 2025	107	Menly; Kakanin vendor	₱350,000	
20	January 8, 2026	115	Darren & Charlie; Marikina City resident	₱200,000 (Note: Darren competed in the jackpot round on behalf of regular player Charlie; consequently, both are officially recognized as joint 20th jackpot winners.)	
21	January 10, 2026	117	MC & Oyeng; Makati City resident	₱100,000 (Note: MC competed in the jackpot round on behalf of regular player Oyeng; consequently, both are officially recognized as joint 21st jackpot winners.)	
22	January 24, 2026	128	Kendall; Celebrity kid	₱100,000	
23	January 28, 2026	131	Lars; Bacoor, Cavite resident	₱350,000	
24	February 11, 2026	143	Tayson; Malate, Manila resident	₱650,000	
25	February 18, 2026	149	Gil; Senior citizen from Manila	₱250,000	
26	February 24, 2026	154	Kulot; Celebrity kid	₱100,000	
27	February 27, 2026	157	Jo; Tunasan, Muntinlupa City resident	₱250,000	
28	March 2, 2026	159	Pat; Senior citizen from Pasay City	₱150,000	
29	April 7, 2026	184	Alma; Senior citizen from Malabon City	₱550,000	
30	April 18, 2026	194	Ricky; Jeepney driver from Metro Manila	₱200,000	
31	April 21, 2026	196	Jackie & Bimbo; Senior citizen from Caloocan City	₱150,000 (Note: Jackie competed in the jackpot round on behalf of regular player Bimbo; consequently, both are officially recognized as joint 31st jackpot winners.)	
32	April 22, 2026	197	Ion & Precy; Tambunting, Manila resident	₱100,000 (Note: Ion competed in the jackpot round on behalf of regular player Precy; consequently, both are officially recognized as joint 32nd jackpot winners. This episode also marked the first and only time a host won the jackpot prize more than once.)	
33	April 24, 2026	199	Gelo; Basketball player from San Juan City	₱150,000	
34	May 9, 2026	212	Ryan & Bing; Mother	₱350,000 (Note: Ryan competed in the jackpot round on behalf of regular player Bing; consequently, both are officially recognized as joint 34th jackpot winners.)	
35	May 14, 2026	216	Danyo; Tricycle driver from Pasay City	₱100,000	
36	May 21, 2026	222	Raqz; Senior citizen from Paco, Manila	₱250,000	
37	May 30, 2026	230	Joan; Nangka, Marikina City resident	₱250,000	
38	June 4, 2026	234	Isay; Olympia, Makati City resident	₱200,000	
39	June 9, 2026	238	Leo; UAAP volleyball player from Adamson University	₱100,000 (Note: Half of Leo’s winnings was donated to the victims of the 2026 Mindanao earthquake, which occurred the day before the episode aired.)	
40	June 12, 2026	241	Divine Tetay; Comedian	₱100,000 (Note: Half of Divine Tetay’s winnings was donated to the Angat Buhay Foundation, which allocated the funds to assist victims of the 2026 Mindanao earthquake. Divine Tetay also chose to donate his own share of the prize to the foundation, resulting in the entire amount being contributed to the relief effort.)	
41	June 20, 2026	247	Mel; Father from National Capital Region	₱300,000	
42	June 25, 2026	251	Lele; Parent of children with special needs	₱100,000	
43	July 21, 2026	273	Pao; San Isidro, Cainta, Rizal resident	₱350,000	
44	July 22, 2026	274	Aik; Saleslady	₱100,000	
45	July 24, 2026	276	Lea; College student from Caloocan City	₱150,000	
46	August 1, 2026	283	Maed; Education student from National Capital Region	₱150,000	
47	August 6, 2026	287	Ver; Barista from San Juan City	₱100,000	
48	August 11, 2026	291	Rovie; Receptionist from Makati City	₱150,000	
49	August 31, 2026	308	Mariel; Cashier from Navotas City	₱500,000	
50	September 15, 2026	321	Erwin; Tinajeros, Malabon resident	₱450,000	
51	October 1, 2026	335	Maye; Tiangge vendor	₱400,000	
52	October 7, 2026	340	Dhion; Accountancy student	₱100,000	
53	October 9, 2026	342	Wil; Gadget technician from NCR	₱150,000	
54	October 22, 2026	351	Feil; Breadwinner	₱1,020,000 (Note: As part of the Dis is Ur Show: DisiSyete Special, the jackpot for the week was a progressive jackpot starting at ₱500,000.)	
55	November 4, 2026	360	Charz; Architecture student from NCR	₱300,000	
56	November 9, 2026	364	Lovely; Pinagsama, Taguig City resident	₱100,000	
57	November 16, 2026	370	Kurt; Latin honor student from NCR	₱300,000	
58	November 19, 2026	373	Rezie; Salon employee	₱100,000	
Total				₱15,576,000	

===== Laro Laro Pick: MagPASKOsikat Special =====
On October 24, 2025, It’s Showtime announced a one-week special run of Laro Laro Pick as part of its 16th anniversary celebration. The special aired from December 1 to 5, 2025.

All civilian contestants participated in each episode with an initial prize of ₱5,000 (₱10,000 in the Tuesday episode and ₱20,000 in the Thursday episode), and awarded another ₱2,000 per each round advanced (or ₱5,000 for Thursday). The winning contestant in the episode advanced to play for a jackpot which is fixed at ₱1 million, with a bigger cash buyout to contestants. For this week, the prize won during the elimination round is guaranteed regardless of their decision in the jackpot round, meaning that the contestants would not leave the show with nothing should they risk it for the jackpot and were unsuccessful.

List of Laro Laro Pick: MagPASKOsikat Special episodes
Episode in special	Episode overall	Airing date	Sector	Elimination round winner	Prize won	Ref.
1	89	December 1, 2025	Solid Showtimers	Karl	₱262,000	
The special anniversary edition of Laro Laro Pick featured long-time loyal Showtimers as contestants, each carrying emotional stories of how It’s Showtime inspired them through personal struggles. Karl, a lifelong fan who grew up watching the show, won the final round. He took the buyout of ₱250,000, citing that the prize money would be a meaningful help for his young family, but later revealed that he got the final question correctly. Despite this, the hosts celebrated his win as a significant and heartfelt victory.
2	90	December 2, 2025	Super Typhoon Uwan Victims (from Catanduanes, Isabela, & Aurora)	Banang	₱316,000 (Note: The remaining ₱700,000 was later distributed among the eliminated contestants, with each receiving approximately ₱30,434.78, in addition to the ₱10,000 to ₱16,000 they had earned during the game, depending on how far the contestants had progressed.)	
The Tuesday episode featured typhoon survivors from Catanduanes, Isabela, and Aurora playing for early Christmas assistance. Contestants shared difficult experiences and hopes after surviving the typhoon. For this episode, contestants are given ₱10,000 at first, for up to ₱16,000 for the last contestant standing, Banang. She took the ₱300,000 buyout and made a right decision, having that she would've got the final question incorrect. After the game ended, Vice Ganda announced that he would split the remaining ₱700,000 (out of the ₱1 million) jackpot to the remaining contestants equally as an act of generosity.
3	91	December 3, 2025	Solid Showtimers (from Visayas)	Fatima	₱311,000	
Solid Showtimers from the Visayas competed in Laro Laro Pick, sharing their long-time loyalty to It’s Showtime, and contestants recalled favorite segments and personal connections. The winner Fatima took a ₱300,000 buyout, which she would use that prize money to build her dream house in Bohol.
4	92	December 4, 2025	2025 Cebu earthquake/Typhoon Tino victims (from Cebu and Negros Occidental)	Disyang	₱1,035,000 (Note: Aside from the ₱1,035,000 won by Disyang, the hosts agreed to donate another ₱1,000,000 to the eliminated contestants, who also received an additional ₱20,000 to ₱30,000 depending on the round in which they were eliminated. Each eliminated contestant received approximately ₱43,478.26.)	
The episode featured typhoon survivors from Cebu and Negros Occidental in a special Laro Laro Pick filled with grief, hope, and aid. One contestant, Luna, received acclaim from the hosts for sharing her tragedy of her loss of her two children and mother-in-law, prompting Ganda to call for accountability and justice. For the episode, contestants begin with ₱20,000 and another ₱5,000 for each round they advanced, up to ₱35,000. The winning contestant, Disyang, declined the ₱500,000 buyout, and successfully answered the question to win the ₱1 million jackpot. Similar to the Tuesday episode, the host also announced that they would split another ₱1 million equally to the remaining players.
5	93	December 5, 2025	Solid Showtimers (from Mindanao)	Angela	₱1,011,000	
The Friday episode featured loyal Solid Showtimers from Mindanao who shared heartfelt stories of long-time support for the show. The winning contestant this episode was a MAPEH teacher from Sultan Kudarat, Angela. Angela declined the buyout and ultimately got the final question correct for the ₱1 million prize. The question is to identify the real name of the host whose nickname is Herminio, Ogie Alcasid, and Ganda initially scared her by ruling her answer as incorrect.
Total					₱2,935,000	-

===== Laro Laro Pick — Dis is Ur Show: DisiSyete Special =====
On October 17, 2026, It’s Showtime announced a second one-week special edition of Laro Laro Pick as part of its 17th anniversary celebration, which aired from October 19 to 24, 2026. In this edition, each episode’s winner advances to a progressive jackpot starting at ₱500,000, half the amount offered in the original special edition, with a higher cash buyout option. All contestants featured were civilians.

The format temporarily reverted to the original, with 24 contestants competing in each episode and 12 advancing to the second round. Each contestant started with ₱5,000, with an additional ₱5,000 awarded for every round advanced, guaranteeing finalists a total prize of ₱20,000.

The rounds were also modified: It's Giving was omitted; it was temporarily replaced by You Gotta Lyric, which returned to its original format. A new round, Act-Song, was introduced after You Gotta Lyric. If a tie remained after Act-Song, the Laro Laro Pick tiebreaker (a game of rock paper scissors) determined which contestant advanced to the jackpot round. If the contestant chose Pot but failed to answer the jackpot question correctly, an additional ₱500,000 was added to the pot for the next episode.

List of Laro Laro Pick — Dis is Ur Show: DisiSyete Special episodes
Episode in special	Episode overall	Airing date	Sector	Elimination round winner	Prize won	Ref.
1	350	October 20, 2026	Luzon flood and typhoon victims	Rey	₱50,000	
The first episode featured typhoon and flood victims from Luzon competing for a ₱500,000 jackpot. Rey won the final tie-breaker and advanced to the jackpot round, hoping to help his family secure a permanent home after flooding damaged their house. Although he chose Pot, he did not provide a response and took home ₱50,000 in accumulated bonuses and an additional gift from Vice Ganda, while the jackpot increased to ₱1 million for the next episode.
2	351	October 22, 2026	Breadwinners	Feil	₱1,020,000	
The special episode featured breadwinners competing for a ₱1 million jackpot. Feil, a working student and lifeguard who supported his grandmother and siblings, chose Pot over a ₱200,000 offer. He correctly answered that It’s Showtime began airing in 2009, winning the ₱1 million jackpot.
Total					₱1,070,000	-

Notes

==== Tawag ng Tanghalan ====
Tawag ng Tanghalan is an amateur singing competition that aired on the ABS-CBN network from 1953 to 1972. It was first revived on March 8, 1987, and lasted until November 26, 1989. It was once again revived as a segment of the show on January 2, 2016, and has since produced seventeen seasons: ten regular seasons, two kids seasons, and five special seasons. Tawag ng Tanghalan is the show's longest-running segment, airing every day since its return in January 2016.

The tenth season, titled Ika-10 Taon, premiered on January 19, 2026, two days after the finale of Duets 2. It concluded on June 13, 2026, with Yannie Paul Basical of Region III (Central Luzon) crowned as grand champion, Charlie Palalisan of Region XII (Soccsksargen) finishing as runner-up, and Jeanel Silvestre of Region I (Ilocos Region) placing third.

A new season, titled The School Showdown 2, has been announced, with auditions already opened for the competition alongside other segments of the show.

=== Former segments ===
The following segments were aired in the show in the past years:

==== Former FUNanghalian segments ====
List of former FUNanghalian segments
Segment	Date appeared	Description	Ref.
Tumpakners	October 30, 2023 – January 5, 2024	In Tumpakners, the hosts are split into two groups, and each group must have a pair representative and that pair is given a category to match while being placed on the other's back. Once the hosts give their signal for the pair to answer, they must face each other and say their answers out loud. For instance, if a group's category is "sour soups," and the pairs of the current group in play say "sinigang" out loud, their answers are valid and the group will receive one point. Each group took turns, and the first team to score three points wins the game, in which they are tasked to award ₱10,000 to two pairs of the audience who are also tasked to play the game and are chosen randomly. In rare cases, the winning condition is reduced to one point, and one pair will be selected to win the cash prize if the segment went over time. If neither teams won, the hosts are required to award ₱5,000 to a random audience member. This segment was also used as the basis for the elimination round on the segment MeCHOOSE-MeCHOOSE.	
MeCHOOSE-MeCHOOSE	November 18, 2023 – January 5, 2024	MeCHOOSE-MeCHOOSE (stylized as meCHOOSE-meCHOOSE) is a two-part survival game where the winning contestant could win up to ₱100,000. It is the successor of RamPanalo. This segment debuted on November 18, 2023. Selected hosts, including those from Showtime Online Ü, handpicked contestants from a certain community for the game Tumpakners to compete in the game. Each contestant chose envelopes containing names of hosts to be paired up with standing back-to-back. When signaled by the hosts, pairs face each other and respond to assigned categories, and a correct response allowed the contestant to stay in the game, while an incorrect answer eliminates the contestant. The last contestant standing moves on to the jackpot round. Each contestant is guaranteed ₱1,000 for their participation. In the jackpot round, similar to Eat Bulaga's "Laban o Bawi" segment, contestants must choose among one box from one set of five boxes containing the base values of 2, 4, 6, 8, or 10. The selected box, along the second set of four boxes containing zeroes, are then randomly shuffled backstage, and then they are tasked to arrange those boxes in an order they believed that the base value would be arranged to the farthest left box. Once the contestant made the decision, each box is opened one at a time starting from the far right, and the contestant wins the amount of money shown on the board. Theoratically, the maximum amount the contestant can win is ₱100,000, with the minimum being ₱2.	
KaraoKids	January 6 – July 13, 2024	KaraoKids (a portmanteau of the words "karaoke" and "kids") is a game segment where four or five pair of hosts, alongside the assistant of children contestants, compete to identify a series of songs in the fastest time possible. In the first format, each team of two members will be tasked on selecting their child contestant from a lot draw; the child will have to sing the given song while wearing headphones, and the team will have up to two minutes to identify the song in the fastest time. If the team identifies the song, remaining contestants will then do the same in the new time limit imposed by the leading team. The team who remains as the fastest team after all four teams have played will compete for the jackpot; if there is a tie in time limit, a sudden-death tiebreak song will be played and the team who identified the first song in a quicker time moves on. Under the second format, the number of teams was increased to five, and each team is given one minute to identify songs, now performed by a KaraoKids member. A correct song earns the team one point and the team to first scoring two points (three prior to March 18, 2024, episode) will move on to the jackpot round. In both formats, the winning team receives ₱10,000. In the jackpot round, the team will be given two minutes to identify as many as three songs, each with incremental difficulty and prize money, with ₱5,000 for the first song, ₱10,000 for the second and ₱15,000 for the third, with winnings amounts accumulated for a maximum total of ₱30,000. Contestants can pass and may return to the previous song if time permits. In the second format, the prize money was not accumulative and are in a ladder format of ₱10,000-₱25,000-₱50,000. The first song is performed by one KaraoKids member and increases by one for each succeeding round. The prize won for the day be either randomly distributed to people with specific jobs sectors (such as street sweepers, car mechanics, etc.) outside the studio; it will be assigned randomly to one host and broadcast on the next episode. Otherwise, the pot may be divided among a set number of people in the audience.	
Showing Bulilit	April 29, 2024 – January 17, 2025	Showing Bulilit is based on both the kids' comedy show Goin' Bulilit and the former It's Showtime segment "Sine Mo 'To". This game involves six different teams of hosts identifying films, television series or theater plays (English or Filipino) through a reenactment of Showtime Kids for a prize money of up to ₱50,000. The first team to identify two titles wins ₱25,000 and compete for a bonus round where they must identify three different original voices of the children's monologues within one minute for the grand prize.	
Bata Bata Pick!	July 30 – September 6, 2024	Bata-Bata Pick! (a portmanteau of the words "bata", meaning child and "bato bato pick", Filipino for rock paper scissors) is a segment similar to the previous segment "Mas Testing". Each episode feature three different teams of two competing with two children in a challenged determined by the host. One team member is assigned as the main player and the other as an alay (companion), who serves as a backup player. The main player then choose between two child players who they believe to have performed the best in each challenge. If the team both correctly identifies the two children, they win ₱10,000 that will be given to the studio audience. If they incorrectly identify it, the team who served as an alay must partake in a punishment game, and the team wins nothing. If all three teams fail to win, each team will instead forfeit ₱10,000 as a donation. If all three teams were successful, the hosts beccomes eligible for the day's punishment game instead.	
Act Lang 'To!	January 6, 2025 – (hiatus)	Act Lang 'To! (lit. 'This is just an act!') is a new game segment where a group of players must guess which one among three hosts is actually experiencing a specific challenge, such as sitting on a block of ice, stepping on a boot filled with slime, or holding a live cockroach. The game consists of three rounds, each featuring a different set of three pre-selected hosts facing unique challenges. During the challenge, all hosts must convincingly pretend they are the ones enduring the task, aiming to mislead the players. After the players make their guess, the hosts reveal the truth by declaring, "Act lang 'to!" if they were faking it. For every correct guess, ₱10,000 is added to the prize pot for the audience. If no money is earned, a fixed cash prize of ₱10,000 will be divided equally among a select group of audience members.	
Hulanino	October 24 - December 27, 2015 (first iteration); January 27 – February 10, 2025 (second iteration)	Hulanino (a portmanteau of the Filipino words hula, meaning "guess," and anino, meaning "shadow") is a guessing game segment where the hosts — or originally, celebrity contestants — must determine what the shadow is trying to convey. This segment debuted in 2015 and originally featured celebrity guests as players. In the game, two groups, each led by a team captain, compete to guess five actions provided by their team. Team members act out the actions behind a screen, using only their shadows, while one member is tasked with guessing. Each game lasts for two and a half minutes (three for the first episode), and for every correct answer, a cash prize of ₱5,000 is awarded to the studio audience, with a maximum prize of ₱25,000. The winning group is determined by the number of correct answers and the fastest time to guess their last word if both groups are tied. The introduction of new mechanics took place on February 5, 2025. A primary host and a Showtime Kids member will be assigned to each team. While the children guess what the hosts are acting out, the main host will describe what the other hosts are acting out. The shadow cannot be seen by the Showtime Kid.	
Ansabe	April 17 - August 19, 2015 (first iteration); February 11 – April 5, 2025 (second iteration)	Ansabe (a play on the Filipino phrase "Ano'ng sabe?" or "What did you say?") is a guessing game where players attempt to guess a set of words based on mouth movements. The original hosts included Kim Atienza as Minister Kim Chi, Ryan Bang as Prince Bang Hyun Sung, and Jhong Hilario as Lee Min Jhong. Similar to Hulanino, this segment debuted in 2015 and originally featured celebrity guests as players. In this iteration, all hosts, including the Showtime Kids, will be divided into three groups: Teams A, B, and C. Each group have a designated leader and a "BuliLip (Bulilit Lip) Reader", who will be responsible for guessing a set of five words. These words will be read individually by five team members. The "BuliLip Reader" and will be placed far from the other hosts. Each game lasts for two minutes. Every correct guess earns ₱5,000 for the studio audience. The winning group is determined by the highest number of correct answers, with the fastest time to guess the first word serving as the tiebreaker if two or all three groups are tied. Lastly, the group with the worst performance of the day receives a punishment. Beginning February 13, 2025, the hosts were required to select two Showtime Kids at random, with the first assigned the "BuliLip Reader" and the second as their "Bulilit Member". They would still need to choose their sequence and set of words.	
KidSONA	May 5, 2025 – (hiatus)	KidSONA: Songs of the Nation Address is a singing and guessing game show. The game is inspired by both the annual State of the Nation Address and the former FUNanghalian segment KaraoKids—of which KidSONA can be considered a sequel—as well as the American children's media franchise Kidsongs and the Japanese children's playpark brand Kidzooona. This segment is a part of the parlor game segment FUNanghalian. It consists of two rounds, the first round where the teams to score two points each are declared winners (later reduced to one with the first team to reach two points proceeding to the jackpot round). Beginning May 8, 2025, a jackpot round is included immediately after, in which three selected kids recite their designated songs before the players make their final guesses. The twist is that the Showtime Kids, dressed in formal attire, recite their song lyrics while standing behind a podium styled after the presidential address.	

==== MASAsagot Mo Ba? ====
MASAsagot Mo Ba? (with "masa" referring to the masses or working class, lit. 'can you answer?') is a quiz segment that aired from July 21 to August 15, 2025, replacing Step... in the Name of Love. It was replaced with Laro Laro Pick. It features unusual questions about everyday objects, not typically found in quiz bee contests.

Two teams of three compete, answering in turns—first players go first, then second, then third. Players are seated on a jeepney-like set, complete with barkers and a driver, and they answer by pulling a string above their heads, similar to how jeepney passengers hold onto the rails while riding. Each correct answer earns one point, and the first team to score three points wins ₱20,000 and moves to the jackpot round. Losing teams receive a ₱10,000 consolation prize.

In the jackpot, each member answers a different question within 30 seconds. If the first player answers incorrectly, the team loses their chance to win the jackpot. For every correct answer, ₱10,000 is added to their pot. If all three answers are correct, an extra ₱50,000 is added, making the maximum possible pot ₱70,000. The final prize is shared with the studio audience.

==== Breaking Muse and Escort Mo, Show Mo ====
Breaking Muse and Escort Mo, Show Mo are beauty pageant segments that premiered on June 30 and July 1, 2025, respectively, replacing Step... in the Name of Love. These segments parodies the tradition of muses and escorts in Filipino basketball leagues—individuals chosen to inspire and support their teams—and features civilian participants aged 18 to 30 who are "G.G.S.S" (gwapong-gwapo or gandang-ganda sa sarili), meaning highly confident in their appearance.

Escort Mo, Show Mo was originally titled Escort of Appeals for its first nine episodes, with the new name taking effect on July 24, 2025 (episode 10 of the segment and episode 19 in total).

Both Breaking Muse and Escort Mo, Show Mo air alternately from Monday to Thursday, with the weekly finals held every Friday, instead of the usual Saturday schedule. An additional Breaking Muse episode aired on July 25, 2025. Due to this, the fourth weekly finals, which was supposed to be originally held that day, was instead rescheduled the next day (Saturday, July 26) for Breaking Muse and the next Monday (July 28) for Escort Mo, Show Mo due to time constraints. Also, the alternate airing of both segments were reversed for the sixth and final week of the Daily Rounds (August 4–7).

The segment ended on August 16, 2025, with Daniel Butas of Brgy. Pasong Kawayan 2, General Trias, Cavite and Verna Joy Tuliao of Brgy. BF-International CAA, Las Piñas declared as grand winners of Escort Mo, Show Mo and Breaking Muse, respectively. Kramim Beraquit of Brgy. Don Bosco, Parañaque City and Joyang Glorioso of Brgy. Sta. Catalina, Pagbilao, Quezon Province were the runners-up, and Mark Colanta of Brgy. San Juan, Cainta, Rizal and Chuchay Lagria of Brgy. San Isidro, Montalban, Rizal finished in third place.

==== Step... in the Name of Love ====
Step... in the Name of Love was a dating game segment aired from April 7 to July 19, 2025, replacing Ansabe. It was replaced with MASAsagot Mo Ba?.

The segment was supposed to air on March 3, 2025, set to replace Showtime Sexy Babe 2025. Auditions for this segment began on February 26, and opened to aspiring contestants aged 18 and above who are single. Applicants must bring a companion and share their story about why they remain single to this day. This segment is the successor to the reality dating game show Expecially for You. This segment was initially shelved as the window part of the set-up hasn't arrived yet and was replaced by the revival of Sine Mo 'To.

In Step... in the Name of Love, a contestant seeks to find a new date with the assistance of a companion. Each pair consists of a "matchmaker," who is the contestant aiming to find a new match, and their "Hype Bestie," a companion or best friend who guides them throughout the process. Three potential matches, usually of the opposite gender, are then introduced. After each round, the potential matches may either "step up" within four steps (the higher the step, the greater the interest) or "step down," indicating disinterest or a mismatch in criteria. If a potential match steps down to the "X" line, they are deemed a "mismatch" and are automatically disqualified from being matched with the contestant. If one of the matches steps on the highest line in the final step, he or she is automatically considered the matchmaker's match; however, if two or all three matches are on the same level of line after all rounds, the matchmaker must name his or her match.

==== Hide and Sing ====
Hide and Sing was a mystery game show in which a celebrity guest plays detective, attempting to determine which of three completely covered-up singers is the true celebrity singer. This segment debuted in October 2020 until May 2021. It returned on January 20, 2025, and ended on March 8, 2025.

The game is played in two rounds: the first round, called "KanTaguan," where all the singers perform a single song together, and the second round, named "Tagong Kampeon," where each singer performs their individual song. During each round, the co-hosts, celebrity guest, and their chosen studio audience member may interrogate the singers, with their voices altered when they speak normally.

After both rounds are completed, the celebrity guest and their audience companion must choose the hidden singer they believe to be the celebrity singer of the day. If they guess correctly, the studio audience member receives ₱5,000. Additionally, if they identify the celebrity singer by name, they will receive an extra ₱5,000. If they fail to guess, the studio audience member will still receive a gift pack from the show.

==== Sine Mo 'To ====
Sine Mo 'To (abbreviated as SMT) is a sketch comedy segment that mocks a variety of issues, unique storylines, and characters. Every day, at least two to three audience members are chosen to perform in the skits. SMT is also known because of their memorable opening billboard "Baliw-Anne Cinema Presents". At the end of the segment, these participants are awarded a cash prize based on their performance. The segment ran from 2012 to 2017 and was eventually moved to the show's YouTube account as Sine Mo 'To: Online Na 'To! hosted by a variety of Hashtags group members. Sine Mo 'To! was also brought back to air as it ran a one-episodic Christmas and New Year specials in 2018 and 2019 and when the segment was revived for their 10th Anniversary special for the whole month of October 2019. The 2025 revival ran from March 4 to April 3, 2025, replacing an unknown and unnamed segment that was supposed to air the previous day (later revealed to be Step... in the Name of Love which aired four days later on April 7), and was replaced by Tawag ng Tanghalan: All-Star Grand Resbak 2025.

Each story typically lasts a week and consists of six episodes, unless otherwise stated.

List of Sine Mo 'To stories
No.	Story	Running dates	No. of episodes	Parody	Guest stars
1	"Soafer Latina: Ang Bagong Soafer Hero" (Soafer Latina: The New Soap-er Hero)	March 4–8, 2025	5	Phrase "Sobrang Latina!", meaning super pretty; My Love Will Make You Disappear; Team Payaman	Arman Salon
"Soafer Latina: Ang Bagong Soafer Hero" follows the story of Tina (Vice Ganda), a kind yet often irritable salon manager, who unexpectedly receives a mysterious soap. Curious about its true purpose, she investigates its origins with Tina, leading to the revelation that the soap grants special abilities. Upon using it, Tina transforms into Soafer Latina, a new hero with unique powers. However, a hair-related issue puts her in the spotlight, with everyone searching for her. As the story reaches its conclusion, the fate of Soafer Latina is revealed. Actor and viral sensation Arman Salon is the guest star of this story, appearing in its fourth episode on March 7, 2025.
2	"My Love Will Make You Appear, Disappear, One-Half, One-Fourth" (Note: Shortened version. The full name of the story's name is "My Love Will Make You Appear, Disappear, One-Half, One-Fourth, One-Fourth, One-Half, Disappear, Appear"; also stylized as "My Love Will Make You Appear, Disappear, ½, ¼ ".)	March 24–29, 2025	6	My Love Will Make You Disappear; Fantastica	—N/a
In "My Love Will Make You Appear, Disappear, 1/2, 1/4", Memerlyn (Vice Ganda), a struggling perya owner, searches for the best magician to revive her fair. Lassy, Jhong Hilario, and Vhong Navarro audition with magic and comedy, while Kim Chiu is amazed by Vice's magic. As the story unfolds, new talents like Saringkingking (Chiu), Baby Doll Johaira, and MagiShawn Mendez (Jhong Hilario) join the competition. Rivalries emerge, leading to the elimination of Kambal Sa Zumba. Despite warnings from Scary Underwood (Bela Padilla) about a deadly disease, Memerlyn continues preparing for the grand opening, which concludes with joyful performances and acrobatic acts.
3	"Wag Kang PaBeBe: The Big Co-Love" (Don't Be PaBeBe: The Big Co-Love) (Note: The slang pabebe means "to act childish".)	March 31 – April 3, 2025	4	Pinoy Big Brother: Celebrity Collab Edition; 'Wag Kang Pabebe (song by Vice Ganda)	AC Bonifacio; Ashley Ortega
Parodying the reality show Pinoy Big Brother: Celebrity Collab Edition, "Wag Kang PaBeBe: The Big Co-Love" features five pairs of "pabebe" housemates are introduced inside "Koya"'s house. They prove their love through daring tasks, such as kissing armpits and showing off romantic dance moves. The women then flex their partners through a debate, but comedic accidents like collapsing sofas and foam wrestling occur. The story also brings back evicted housemates AC Bonifacio and Ashley Ortega, leading to a task where the housemates reenact viral emotional memes, causing hilarious drama and playful flour fights. Emotions run high as some housemates go missing, and Jose Marie faces a unique eviction challenge against new housemate Johaira, ending with an intense water balloon showdown. The cast and their "pairs" with their monikers: JackLyn: Darren Espanto as Lyndon, "Ang Romantic Heartthrob ng Canada"; Jackie Gonzaga as Jackque Gyl, "Ang Sexy Water Girl ng Rizal"; Mang Ca-Dore: Teddy Corpuz as Theodore, "Ang Nose-Chalant ng Lagro"; Jugs Jugueta as Erica, "Ang Tummy-Bear ng Manila"; SungAlda: Lassy Marquez as Reginalda, "Ang Cobrang Latina ng Caloocan"; Ryan Bang as Hyung-Sung, "Ang Bulol na Oppa ng South Korea"; NiaNio: Ogie Alcasid as Herminio, "Ang GGSS Geng-Geng ng Magallanes"; MC Muah Calaquian as Melvinia, "Ang Chinita Freshidente ng Quezon City"; BeniMarie: Ion Perez as Benigno, "Ang Pambansang Joker ng Tarlac"; Vice Ganda as Jose Marie, "Ang Pambansang Meme ng Quezon City"; The season's first evicted pair, actress and dancer AC Bonifacio and actress Ashley Ortega, appeared as guest stars in the story's third episode on April 2, 2025. NOTE: The episodes of this story were reduced from six to four to make way for Tawag ng Tanghalan: All-Star Grand Resbak 2025.

==== Quiz V ====
Quiz V was a quiz segment that premiered on March 4, 2025, wherein Vice Ganda asks trivia questions to the Madlang People about general information and current events. The audience gets prize money (usually ₱2,000) if the audience answers their assigned question correctly. This segment usually serves as a filler gap when a segment ends earlier than expected.

==== Showtime Sexy Babe 2025 ====
The beauty pageant competition Showtime Sexy Babe returned for its second season in 2025, then titled as Showtime Sexy Babe 2025. Auditions for this segment opened on January 11. This competition is open to girls, transgender people, and bisexuals between the ages of 18 and 28, who are confidently beautiful regardless of their appearance, body type, size, or flaw. This segment debuted in December 2021, and Sam Coloso won the season. It is also notable for Cianne Dominguez, who was a semifinalist and later became one of the show's main hosts; Jubilyn Sabino and Johaira Moris, who were both grand finalists, later became members of Showtime Baby Dolls. The segment returned on January 20, 2025, and ended on March 1, 2025, with Zeah Pala as the season's grand winner.

==== And the Breadwinner Is... ====
And the Breadwinner Is... was a game show that is similar to the segment TrabaHula and is named after the family comedy-drama film of the same name by Vice Ganda that also served as a promotion for the film, debuted on November 25, 2024, replacing Kalokalike: Face 4, and ended in January 2025.

==== Kalokalike: Face 4 ====
Season four of the impersonation talent show Kalokalike, dubbed as "Kalokalike: Face 4", premiered on September 2, 2024, and ran until November 23, 2024. This marked the return of the segment almost ten years since its last season in 2013. At the end of the season, Vyan Dela Cruz, who impersonated singer KZ Tandingan, was crowned the fourth "Ultimate Kalokalike", besting 15 other grand finalists.

Kalokalike had already aired three seasons since its debut in 2013. The competition had three winners: Jonathan Garcia as actor Christopher de Leon, Jennifer Catayong (a.k.a. Nicki Morena) as rapper Nicki Minaj, and Daniel Uy Aliermo (a.k.a. Daniela Diva) as It's Showtime host and comedian Vice Ganda.

==== Throwbox ====
Throwbox was a game show that premiered on September 7, 2024. In "Throwbox," players have the opportunity to "go back in time" by answering trivia questions about different decades, ranging from the 1970s to the 2010s. The game consists of two parts: an elimination round and the main gameplay.

In the elimination round, a group of ten players each selects one of ten colored boxes. The objective is to pick the correct box containing a star and confetti (later replaced by a picture of a specific It's Showtime host). The player who selects this box advances to the main round and instantly receives ₱10,000, while those who do not select the correct box receive ₱1,000 for participation.

Before the main game begins, the advancing player must set aside half of their ₱10,000 as savings and risk the other half as the initial stake. The hosts then introduce ten boxes, each featuring a question related to a specific year and a corresponding cash amount. For example, a box marked "1989" may be worth ₱15,000. The player is required to choose five out of the ten boxes. Each box contains a question with three multiple-choice answers. If the player answers correctly, the cash value of the box is added to their bank; if incorrect, the same amount is deducted.

After playing and answering questions from five boxes, the contestant has a chance to either double, triple, halve, or even lose their banked money in the "Super Box" round, which features a different question and year category. Before this round begins, the contestant must choose between two options: "Doble o Kalahati" (Double or Half) or "Triple o Sawi" (Triple or Nothing). In "Doble o Kalahati", a correct answer doubles the contestant's bank, while an incorrect answer reduces it by half. In "Triple o Sawi" a correct answer triples the bank, but an incorrect answer results in losing all the money. The "Super Box" question contains four multiple-choice answers.

==== Expecially for You ====
Expecially for You (stylized as "eXpecially for you" and "EXpecially for You") was a reality dating segment that premiered on December 4, 2023, and ended on August 30, 2024, replacing the dance competition segment It's Showdown. The segment's name is a pun on Kylie Minogue and Jason Donovan's song "Especially for You", as well as the word "ex," which refers to a previous relationship. In rare instances, if a searcher's ex isn't on the show, they may be joined by a close friend or relative. This segment was open to people of all genders aged 18 and up. Auditions were open to: any couple can audition for the show, but they must have broken up and be on good terms; and to audition as a searchee, any civilian who is single and "ready to mingle" regardless of gender can do so. The segment was replaced by Kalokalike: Face 4.

==== It's Showdown ====
It's Showdown was a dance competition that premiered from October 30 to December 2, 2023, replacing Mini Miss U. The competition features the so-called "Classic Showtime" format: dance groups from around the Philippines battle and show off their dance skills in the "Showdance Arena" vying to become the segment's grand champion. It is open to all dance groups: all boys, all girls, all LGBTQ+, or mixed, and all ages 16 and up. At the end of the competition, Fresno Style PH was crowned the grand champion, with United Alliance in second place, and AMK Rock Nation coming in third place. The segment was replaced by Expecially for You.

==== Mini Miss U ====
Mini Miss U was a beauty pageant competition for kids aged 8 years old and below. Mini Miss U was first aired on January 6, 2020, but was cancelled following the COVID-19 pandemic and the ABS-CBN shutdown. Auditions for this segment was held starting on June 7, 2023. The segment then returned on June 19, 2023 and ran until October 28, 2023, where Arianah Kelsey Lasam was named the winner. She later became a member of Showtime Kids together with Enicka Xaria Orbe and Briseis Ericka Quijano who also became grand finalists after their respective stints in the competition.

=== Showtime Online Ü segments ===
Segments on Showtime Online Ü mirror those aired on its television counterpart, while also featuring exclusive content that is available only through the online platform. Selected segments (marked with an asterisk *) are sponsored by Røde Microphones.

List of current Showtime Online Ü segments
Segment name	Description
Current segments
SOÜ KanTambayan	The hosts—particularly the singer-hosts Anne Tenorio, Anthony Castillo, JM Dela Cerna, Lorraine Galvez, Mackie Empuerto, Marielle Montellano, and Sheena Belarmino—deliver a song intermission, typically performed during the pre-shows. At times, guest performers are invited to take the place of the singer-hosts, typically to promote their gigs or newly released singles on the show's online platform.
Quiet on Set *	The hosts and special guests engage in discussions about current events, particularly when promoting upcoming projects, all within a round-table format.
Talking Bulilit *	The hosts and children interact in a calm and relaxed format, serving as the counterpart to Galing Bulilit.
Galing Bulilit *	The children showcase their talents—such as singing, dancing, or acting—in front of the hosts and the audience, serving as the counterpart to Talking Bulilit.
Try It Bulilit *	The children participate in a variety of activities, ranging from trying featured dishes and making origami to completing other themed challenges.
Palarong Pambata	The children participate in a variety of games, such as puzzles, spelling bees, and other skill-based challenges.
Ikembot Mo/Oooh Lala Baby Dance Challenge	Two contestants, originally selected from the participants of Laro Laro Pick and later from the studio audience, compete in a dance showdown set to “Ikembot Mo” or “Oooh Lala Baby” by the Baby Dolls for the title of Winner of the Day. The winner is determined by two or more members of the Baby Dolls and receives ₱1,000, while the runner-up is awarded ₱500.
Turo ng Tanghalan	The singer-hosts provide valuable tips and advice on singing techniques, vocal care, and performance strategies. They also offer insightful commentary on the contenders of the day in "Tawag ng Tanghalan," highlighting strengths, areas for improvement, and overall stage presence.
Former segments
SOÜ Daycare	The hosts engage with the Showtime Kids through various games and challenges in a segment that airs exclusively when the kids are present, typically following kid-related segments.
Spluk... in the Name of Love	The hosts discuss the featured pair of the day from "Step... in the Name of Love" in a podcast-style format. They analyze the chemistry, interactions, and dynamics between the pair, while also considering the three potential matches for each. The hosts also share their personal insights and opinions. Also, viewers are encouraged to participate by sharing their comments live during the broadcast.
Liga sa SOÜ	The hosts interview selected members of the two barangays currently featured in Breaking Muse and Escort Mo, Show Mo, followed by a trivia game where participants have the chance to win cash prizes.
Kwentong Kanto	The hosts interview the winning Breaking Muse or Escort Mo, Show Mo of the day, discussing the contestant's experience and journey throughout the segment.
House of Representa-Kids	A parody of the House of Representatives, the Showtime Kids share their personal opinions on questions submitted by viewers (or sometimes by celebrities) through social media.
SOÜ Palaru!	Those that who were eliminated on Laro Laro Pick! play a game of "It's Giving!" and be the last man standing to win a cash prize ₱1,000 and an exclusive SOÜ t-shirt.

== Reception ==
=== Accolades ===
List of accolades received by It's Showtime
Number of wins and nominations
Wins	50+
Nominations	70+
(Not all awards and nominations are listed below)

Year	Award	Category	Nominated artist / work	Result	Ref.
2010	24th PMPC Star Awards for Television	Best Talent Search Program	It's Showtime	Won	
2010	24th PMPC Star Awards for Television	Best Talent Search Program Host	Kim Atienza, Anne Curtis, Vice Ganda, and Vhong Navarro	Nominated	
2011	25th PMPC Star Awards for Television	Best Talent Search Program	It's Showtime	Won	
2011	25th PMPC Star Awards for Television	Best Talent Search Program Host	Kim Atienza, Teddy Corpuz, Billy Crawford, Anne Curtis, Vice Ganda, Jugs Jugueta, Karylle, and Vhong Navarro	Nominated	
2012	2nd EdukCircle Awards	Best TV Comedian	Vice Ganda	Won	
2012	8th USTv Student's Choice Awards	Best Reality Show	It's Showtime	Won	
2012	34th Catholic Mass Media Award	Best Entertainment Program	It's Showtime	Nominated	
2012	26th PMPC Star Awards for Television	Best Reality and Game Show	It's Showtime	Won	
2012	26th PMPC Star Awards for Television	Best Reality and Game Show Host	Kim Atienza, Ryan Bang, Teddy Corpuz, Billy Crawford, Anne Curtis, Vice Ganda, Coleen Garcia, Jhong Hilario, Jugs Jugueta, Karylle, Vhong Navarro, and Joy Rendon	Won	
2013	4th Golden Screen TV Awards	Outstanding Variety Program	It's Showtime	Nominated	
2013	4th Golden Screen TV Awards	Outstanding Female Host in a Musical or Variety Program	Anne Curtis	Nominated	
2013	4th Golden Screen TV Awards	Outstanding Female Host in a Musical or Variety Program	Karylle	Nominated	
2013	4th Golden Screen TV Awards	Outstanding Male Host in a Musical or Variety Program	Vice Ganda	Nominated	
2013	9th USTv Student's Choice Awards	Best Variety Show	It's Showtime	Won	
2013	9th USTv Student's Choice Awards	Best Variety Show Host	Anne Curtis	Won	
2013	27th PMPC Star Awards for Television	Best Variety Show	It's Showtime	Won	
2013	27th PMPC Star Awards for Television	Best Female TV Host	Anne Curtis	Won	
2013	27th PMPC Star Awards for Television	Best Female TV Host	Karylle	Nominated	
2013	27th PMPC Star Awards for Television	Best Male TV Host	Billy Crawford	Won	
2013	27th PMPC Star Awards for Television	Best Male TV Host	Vice Ganda	Nominated	
2013	27th PMPC Star Awards for Television	Best Male TV Host	Vhong Navarro	Nominated	
2014	5th Golden Screen TV Awards	Outstanding Variety Program	It's Showtime	Nominated	
2014	5th Golden Screen TV Awards	Outstanding Female Host in a Musical or Variety Program	Anne Curtis	Won	
2014	5th Golden Screen TV Awards	Outstanding Female Host in a Musical or Variety Program	Karylle	Nominated	
2014	5th Golden Screen TV Awards	Outstanding Male Host in a Musical or Variety Program	Vice Ganda	Nominated	
2014	5th Golden Screen TV Awards	Outstanding Male Host in a Musical or Variety Program	Vhong Navarro	Nominated	
2014	4th EdukCircle Awards	Best TV Comedian	Vice Ganda	Won	
2014	4th Yahoo! OMG Awards	Best Male TV Host	Vhong Navarro	Won	
2014	4th Yahoo! OMG Awards	Best Female TV Host	Karylle	Nominated	
2014	4th Yahoo! OMG Awards	Love Team of the Year	Vice Ganda and Karylle	Won	
2014	28th PMPC Star Awards for Television	Best Variety Show	It's Showtime	Won	
2014	28th PMPC Star Awards for Television	Best Female TV Host	Anne Curtis	Nominated	
2014	28th PMPC Star Awards for Television	Best Male TV Host	Billy Crawford	Nominated	
2014	28th PMPC Star Awards for Television	Best Male TV Host	Vice Ganda	Won	
2015	5th EdukCircle Awards	Best TV Personality in Comedy	Vice Ganda	Won	
2015	6th Golden Screen TV Awards	Outstanding Variety Program	It's Showtime	Nominated	
2015	6th Golden Screen TV Awards	Outstanding Female Host in a Musical or Variety Program	Anne Curtis	Nominated	
2015	6th Golden Screen TV Awards	Outstanding Female Host in a Musical or Variety Program	Karylle	Nominated	
2015	6th Golden Screen TV Awards	Outstanding Male Host in a Musical or Variety Program	Billy Crawford	Nominated	
2015	6th Golden Screen TV Awards	Outstanding Male Host in a Musical or Variety Program	Vice Ganda	Won	
2015	6th Golden Screen TV Awards	Outstanding Male Host in a Musical or Variety Program	Vhong Navarro	Nominated	
2015	2nd Paragala Central Luzon Media Awards	Best Variety Show	It's Showtime	Won	
2015	2nd Paragala Central Luzon Media Awards	Best Male TV Host	Vice Ganda	Won	
2015	11th USTv Student's Choice Awards	Best Variety Show	It's Showtime	Won	
2015	29th PMPC Star Awards for Television	Best Musical Variety Show	It's Showtime	Nominated	
2015	29th PMPC Star Awards for Television	Best Female TV Host	Anne Curtis	Won	
2015	29th PMPC Star Awards for Television	Best Male TV Host	Billy Crawford	Nominated	
2015	29th PMPC Star Awards for Television	Best Male TV Host	Vice Ganda	Won	
2016	6th EdukCircle Awards	Most Outstanding TV Personality in Comedy	Vice Ganda	Won	
2016	Golden Laurel Lyceans' Choice Media Awards	Best Noontime Show	It's Showtime	Won	
2016	2nd Aral Parangal Awards of the Young Educators' Council of SOCKSARGEN (YECS)	Best TV Variety Show	It's Showtime	Won	
2016	12th USTv Student's Choice Awards	Best Variety Show	It's Showtime	Nominated	
2016	12th USTv Student's Choice Awards	Best Female Show Host	Anne Curtis	Won	
2016	30th PMPC Star Awards for Television				
2016	30th PMPC Star Awards for Television	Best Variety Show	It's Showtime	Nominated	
2016	30th PMPC Star Awards for Television	Best Female TV Host	Anne Curtis	Won	
2016	30th PMPC Star Awards for Television	Best Female TV Host	Karylle	Nominated	
2016	30th PMPC Star Awards for Television	Best Female TV Host	Amy Perez	Nominated	
2016	30th PMPC Star Awards for Television	Best Male TV Host	Billy Crawford	Nominated	
2016	30th PMPC Star Awards for Television	Best Male TV Host	Vice Ganda	Nominated	
2016	30th PMPC Star Awards for Television	Best New Male TV Personality	Nikko Natividad	Nominated	
2016	30th PMPC Star Awards for Television	Best New Female TV Personality	Miho Nishida	Nominated	
2016	Anak TV Seal Awards	Household Favorite Program	It's Showtime	Won	
2017	1st Gawad Lasallianeta	Most Outstanding Noontime Show	It's Showtime	Won	
2017	7th EdukCircle Awards	Best Female Variety Show Host	Anne Curtis	Won	
2017	7th EdukCircle Awards	Most Outstanding TV Personality in Comedy	Vice Ganda	Won	
2017	3rd RAWR Awards	Trending Show of the Year	It's Showtime	Won	
2017	31st PMPC Star Awards for Television	Best Variety Show	It's Showtime	Nominated	
2017	31st PMPC Star Awards for Television	Best Female TV Host	Anne Curtis	Nominated	
2017	31st PMPC Star Awards for Television	Best Female TV Host	Nadine Lustre	Nominated	
2017	31st PMPC Star Awards for Television	Best Female TV Host	Amy Perez	Nominated	
2017	31st PMPC Star Awards for Television	Best Male TV Host	Billy Crawford	Nominated	
2017	31st PMPC Star Awards for Television	Best Male TV Host	Vice Ganda	Won	
2018	4th RAWR Awards	Favorite Group of the Year	Hashtags	Won	
2018	4th RAWR Awards	Trending Show of the Year	It's Showtime	Won	
2018	32nd PMPC Star Awards for Television	Best Variety Show	It's Showtime	Nominated	
2018	32nd PMPC Star Awards for Television	Best Female TV Host	Anne Curtis	Nominated	
2018	32nd PMPC Star Awards for Television	Best Female TV Host	Amy Perez	Nominated	
2018	32nd PMPC Star Awards for Television	Best Male TV Host	Vice Ganda	Nominated	
2018	32nd PMPC Star Awards for Television	Best Male TV Host	Vhong Navarro	Nominated	
2018	32nd PMPC Star Awards for Television	Best New Male TV Personality	Greg Hawkins	Nominated	
2018	32nd PMPC Star Awards for Television	Best New Male TV Personality	Wilbert Ross	Nominated	
2018	32nd PMPC Star Awards for Television	Best New Female TV Personality	Jackie Gonzaga	Nominated	
2019	2nd Gawad Lasallianeta	Most Outstanding Variety Show	It's Showtime	Won	
2019	9th EdukCircle Awards	Best Female Noontime Show Host	Anne Curtis	Won	
2019	9th EdukCircle Awards	Best Male Noontime Show Host	Vice Ganda	Won	
2019	5th RAWR Awards	Royal Pride Awardee	It's Showtime	Won	
2019	5th RAWR Awards	Breakthrough Artist of the Year	Ion Perez	Won	
2019	33rd PMPC Star Awards for Television	Best Variety Show	It's Showtime	Nominated	
2019	33rd PMPC Star Awards for Television	Best Female TV Host	Anne Curtis	Won	
2019	33rd PMPC Star Awards for Television	Best Female TV Host	Amy Perez	Nominated	
2019	33rd PMPC Star Awards for Television	Best Male TV Host	Vice Ganda	Won	
2020	3rd Gawad Lasallianeta	Most Outstanding Musical/Variety Show and Hosts	It's Showtime	Won	
2020	6th RAWR Awards	Trending Show of the Year	It's Showtime	Won	
2020	7th Paragala Central Luzon Media Awards	Best Noontime Show	It's Showtime	Won	
2021	7th RAWR Awards	Favorite TV Host of the year	Vice Ganda	Won	
2021	34th PMPC Star Awards for Television	Best Variety Show	It's Showtime	Won	
2021	34th PMPC Star Awards for Television	Best Female TV Host	Anne Curtis	Nominated	
2021	34th PMPC Star Awards for Television	Best Female TV Host	Karylle	Nominated	
2021	34th PMPC Star Awards for Television	Best Female TV Host	Amy Perez	Won	
2021	34th PMPC Star Awards for Television	Best Male TV Host	Vice Ganda	Won	
2021	34th PMPC Star Awards for Television	Best New Male TV Personality	Dan Delgado	Nominated	
2021	34th PMPC Star Awards for Television	Best New Male TV Personality	Wize Estabillo	Nominated	
2021	34th PMPC Star Awards for Television	Best New Male TV Personality	Jin Macapagal	Nominated	
2021	34th PMPC Star Awards for Television	Best New Male TV Personality	Ron Macapagal	Nominated	
2022	4th Gawad Lasallianeta	Most Outstanding Talent Competition	Tawag ng Tanghalan	Won	
2022	4th Gawad Lasallianeta	Most Outstanding Entertainment Show Host	Vice Ganda	Won	
2022	4th Gawad Lasallianeta	Most Effective Male Comedian	Vice Ganda	Won	
2022	19th Gawad Tanglaw Awards	Best Variety Program	It's Showtime	Won	
2022	6th GEMS Awards	Best TV Program Host	Ogie Alcasid	Won	
2023	35th PMPC Star Awards for Television	Best Variety Show	It's Showtime	Nominated	
2023	35th PMPC Star Awards for Television	Best Female TV Host	Kim Chiu	Won	
2023	35th PMPC Star Awards for Television	Best Female TV Host	Karylle	Nominated	
2023	35th PMPC Star Awards for Television	Best Female TV Host	Amy Perez	Nominated	
2023	35th PMPC Star Awards for Television	Best Male TV Host	Vice Ganda	Nominated	
2023	5th Gawad Lasallianeta	Most Outstanding Variety Show	It's Showtime	Won	
2023	5th Gawad Lasallianeta	Most Outstanding Variety Show Host	Anne Curtis	Won	
2023	6th Golden Laurel Media Awards	Best Variety Show	It's Showtime	Won	
2023	6th Golden Laurel Media Awards	Breakthrough Batangueño Social Media Child Personality	Princess Kathryn "Kulot" Caponpon	Won	
2023	20th Gawad Tanglaw Awards	Best Variety Show	It's Showtime	Won	
2023	Anak TV Seal Awards	Household Favorite Program for Television	It's Showtime	Won	
2024	6th Gawad Lasallianeta	Most Outstanding Variety Show	It's Showtime	Won	
2024	6th Gawad Lasallianeta	Most Outstanding Male Entertainment Show Host	Vice Ganda	Won	
2024	6th Gawad Lasallianeta	Most Outstanding Female Entertainment Show Host	Anne Curtis	Won	
2024	9th Platinum Stallion National Media Awards	Best Variety Show	It's Showtime	Won	
2024	1st Perpetualites' Choice Awards	Best Noontime Variety Show	It's Showtime	Won	
2024	1st Perpetualites' Choice Awards	Best Noontime Variety Show Host	Vice Ganda	Won	
2025	7th Gawad Lasallianeta	Most Outstanding Variety Show	It's Showtime	Won	
2025	7th Gawad Lasallianeta	Most Outstanding Variety Show Host	Vice Ganda	Won	
2025	7th Gawad Lasallianeta	Most Outstanding Child Star	Argus Aspiras	Won	
2025	10th Platinum Stallion National Media Awards	Best Noontime Show	It's Showtime	Won	
2025	37th PMPC Star Awards for Television	It's Showtime	Best Variety Show	Won	
2025	37th PMPC Star Awards for Television	Best Male TV Host	Vice Ganda	Nominated	
2025	37th PMPC Star Awards for Television	Best Female TV Host	Kim Chiu	Won	
2025	37th PMPC Star Awards for Television	Best Female TV Host	Anne Curtis	Nominated	
2025	37th PMPC Star Awards for Television	Best Female TV Host	Karylle	Nominated	
2025	37th PMPC Star Awards for Television	Best Female TV Host	Amy Perez	Nominated	
2025	37th PMPC Star Awards for Television	Best New Male TV Personality	Argus Aspiras	Nominated	
2025	37th PMPC Star Awards for Television	Best New Female TV Personality	Princess Kathryn "Kulot" Caponpon	Nominated	
2025	38th PMPC Star Awards for Television	Best Variety Show	It's Showtime	Won	
2025	38th PMPC Star Awards for Television	Best Male TV Host	Ogie Alcasid	Nominated	
2025	38th PMPC Star Awards for Television	Best Male TV Host	Darren Espanto	Nominated	
2025	38th PMPC Star Awards for Television	Best Male TV Host	Vice Ganda	Nominated	
2025	38th PMPC Star Awards for Television	Best Female TV Host	Kim Chiu	Nominated	
2025	38th PMPC Star Awards for Television	Best Female TV Host	Anne Curtis	Won	
2025	38th PMPC Star Awards for Television	Best Female TV Host	Karylle	Nominated	
2025	38th PMPC Star Awards for Television	Best Female TV Host	Amy Perez	Nominated	
2025	Anak TV Seal Awards	Anak TV Seal Award for Television	It's Showtime	Won	
2026	11th Platinum Stallion National Media Awards	Best Noontime Show	It's Showtime	Won	

=== Ratings ===
Showtime debuted on its pre-noontime slot on October 24, 2009, with a 14.0% national TV rating based on Kantar Media Philippines, and then moved on the noontime slot from October 2010 to February 2011. Its immense popularity ended the dominance of talk show SiS on its timeslot. GMA Network replaced SiS with Diz Iz It!, a competition similar to Showtime, but it was cancelled after five months.

Showtime's first grand finals held in July 2010 received a 35% national TV rating, beating the 8.9% rating of Diz Iz It! and 13.7% of Eat Bulaga! The second grand finals held in December 2010 scored a 23.4% national TV rating against Eat Bulaga!'s 17.4%. The third grand finals in May 2011 also delivered a rating of 21.3% versus Eat Bulaga!'s 17%.

Showtime again moved to the noontime slot for the second and current time on February 6, 2012, after one year and the show's one week hiatus (now using its current name It's Showtime), with a 13.6% national rating. The episode received an overall 16.3% rating when the viewership numbers from Studio 23 were added. Initially placing behind Eat Bulaga!, the show's rating peaked to a 20.9% national rating during the finals of the "Bida Kapamilya" segment and its third anniversary week-long celebration.

The finals of the Kalokalike segment in June 2013 garnered a 26.8% national TV rating, leaving Eat Bulaga! and Wowowillie with 13.2% and 2.8% ratings, respectively. The finals of the segment's second iteration posted a 21.6% national TV rating, once again beating Eat Bulaga!'s 15.8% and Wowowillie's 2.6%.

It's Showtime continued its dominance in the noontime slot with its fourth anniversary week special held from October 21–26, 2013.

The program faced heavy competition in 2015 when the sixth anniversary special only scored a 10.2% national TV rating, four times behind Eat Bulaga's 40.1%. This is due to the Tamang Panahon special (and the build-up before that), which served as the climax of the then-popular Kalyeserye segment which featured AlDub.

It's Showtime quickly regained its prominence on its time slot when Tawag ng Tanghalan launched in 2016. The program garnered a 33.6% national TV rating during the singing competition's first grand finals, over Eat Bulaga's 11.7%. Tawag ng Tanghalan continued its winning streak during its second-season finale when it posted a national TV rating of 31% against Eat Bulaga's 9.5%. It's Showtime topped the ratings game once again during the first grand finals of Miss Q and A segment on June 30, 2018, with a national TV rating of 28.4% versus Eat Bulaga's 11.1%.

The second Miss Q and A grand finals posted a national TV rating of 27.4%, beating Eat Bulaga's 10.6%, Asawa Ko, Karibal Ko's 13.8%, and Tadhana's 11.3%.

Tawag ng Tanghalan third-season finale posted a national TV rating of 25.8%, beating Eat Bulaga's 10.4% and Hanggang Sa Dulo Ng Buhay Ko's 9.5%.

On January 27, 2024, Tawag ng Tanghalan seventh-season finale posted a national TV rating of 4.8% beating Eat Bulaga's 4.5% and Tahanang Pinakamasaya's 2.7%

On February 7, 2024, It's Showtime achieved a historic victory since the ABS-CBN shutdown with a rating of 4.4% once again beating Eat Bulaga's 3.9% and Tahanang Pinakamasaya's 3.1%.

On March 1 and 2, 2024, It's Showtime once again made victories in the ratings with 4.6% and 5.1% respectively. Thus, beating both Eat Bulaga's 4.1% and 4.7% and the finale of Tahanang Pinakamasaya's 2.9% and 2.8%.

On their GMA Network debut last April 6, It's Showtime achieved 524,294 peak concurrent views online and historic rating victory since the ABS-CBN shutdown with an all-time high rating of 9.7% beating Eat Bulaga's 4.4%.

On June 20 and July 5, 2024, It's Showtime made victories in the ratings with 7.9% and 8.7% respectively once again beating Eat Bulaga's 3.6% and 4.0%.

On July 18, 2024, It's Showtime once again achieved a historic victory since the ABS-CBN shutdown and return to the original frequencies through ALLTV last June 17, with a rating of 9.4% beating Eat Bulaga's 3.8%.

== Controversies ==
A series of statements by guest judge Rosanna Roces against certain groups during an episode in January 2010 attracted controversy for perceived insensitivity towards teachers. ABS-CBN relieved Roces of her jury duty as a form of self-regulation, but Movie and Television Review and Classification Board (MTRCB) placed the program under a 20-day preventive suspension on January 11, 2010. A placeholder variety show titled Magpasikat was aired in lieu of Showtime; Magpasikat had essentially the same talent show format as Showtime except that the competing groups are composed of celebrities. The suspension only lasted for six days after the Court of Appeals issued a 60-day temporary restraining order against the MTRCB's suspension. Showtime eventually returned on air on January 19, 2010. In March 2010, MTRCB ordered a total one-month suspension of the program because of the incident, including the replacement program Magpasikat. The MTRCB also directed the filing of criminal charges against Florida Tan, ABS-CBN vice-president for programming, and other officers "responsible for the violation." Bong Osorio, head of ABS-CBN's Corporate Communications said that the suspension was not yet final and that they were seeking appeal before the Office of the President. The variety show later on won the case because the MTRCB had not presented new arguments that would justify a reversal of its previous resolution.

The program's dating game segment Nasaan Ka, Mr. Pastillas? drew ire from netizens and women's group Gabriela for "pimping" Angelica Yap, popularly known as Pastillas Girl. The program responded to Gabriela's statement, saying that it is "hurtful and offensive to women like Angelica who has done nothing wrong but to share her story with the hope of getting another shot at love." It also clarified the segment's intent of helping Yap find love and recover from a failed relationship. MTRCB summoned the show's executives to give a list of suggestions on how to improve the segment.

On September 4, 2023, the MTRCB suspended the noontime show over an alleged obscene act by Vice Ganda and Ion Perez in a July 25 episode of the "Isip Bata" segment. However, the show continues to air as their network filed a motion for reconsideration. Atty. Juan Ponce Enrile, Chief Presidential Legal Counsel, criticized what he perceived as an immoral action on part of Vice and Ion. On September 28, the MTRCB denied the motion for reconsideration filed by ABS-CBN and GMA Network, allowing the networks to appeal to the Office of the President within 15 days. On October 6, both GMA and ABS-CBN decided not to appeal to the Office of the President, leaving the program suspended from October 14 to 27. Another variety show, It's Your Lucky Day temporarily took It's Showtime's timeslot during the suspension period.

Teacher Tony Dizon issued an apology after mistakenly stating that Gloria Macapagal Arroyo was the first female president of the Philippines instead of Corazon Aquino on the show's trivia segment Throwbox on September 19, 2024. Acknowledging the backlash and accusations of boastfulness after sharing his academic achievements, Dizon expressed surprise at the mistake, noting the pressure of performing live. In a Facebook video, he emphasized the importance of learning from mistakes and urged the public to understand the challenges of being in the spotlight. Dizon concluded by stating that while criticism is inevitable, how one responds defines their character. The segment later went on hiatus and eventually never returned in future episodes.

On the February 28, 2025, episode of the beauty pageant competition Showtime Sexy Babe 2025, contestant Heart Aquino admitted having limited knowledge about the Commission on Elections (COMELEC) when asked for her message to the poll body, prompting concern from host Vice Ganda. At 20 years old, Aquino also revealed she has not yet voted, drawing public attention. In response, COMELEC Chairperson George Garcia announced that Aquino was invited to the COMELEC office in Manila for voter education. He emphasized that "many young Filipinos may also lack awareness of the poll body's role, and stated that it is COMELEC's duty to address this gap." Garcia expressed hope that educating Aquino could inspire others to become more informed voters. As a response to the incident, It's Showtime re-introduced its quiz segment called "Quiz V" on March 3, 2025, aiming to promote general knowledge and awareness among its audience.

On June 20, 2026, host Kim Chiu drew criticism from some social media users following a comedic skit during the "You Gotta Lyric" round of the "Laro Laro Pick" segment. While performing alongside Brent Manalo and Jugs Jugueta, Chiu reacted to Jugueta's portrayal of the Feng Shui character Lotus Feet by joking, "Ay! Bakit si Ryzza Mae?" (Oh! Why Ryzza Mae?), referring to Eat Bulaga! host Ryzza Mae Dizon. Jugueta subsequently danced to "Cha Cha Dabarkads", imitating Dizon's signature dance moves. After Chiu shared a clip of the segment on social media, some netizens criticized the remark as insensitive and called on the host to apologize to Dizon. Neither Chiu nor Dizon publicly commented on the incident. The incident was later referenced on the July 4, 2026 episode of Eat Bulaga! after host Vic Sotto announced that he was scheduled to meet with It's Showtime host Vice Ganda. Fellow host Joey de Leon then jokingly asked Ryzza Mae Dizon, "Ikaw Ryzza, kailan kayo mag-uusap ni Kim Chiu?" ("How about you, Ryzza? When are you and Kim Chiu going to talk?"), alluding to the online criticism surrounding Chiu's earlier remark. Dizon laughed before addressing the camera and greeting Chiu with a friendly shoutout, while fellow hosts Maine Mendoza and Miles Ocampo also greeted her. The exchange was widely interpreted as a lighthearted acknowledgment of the incident and did not indicate any public disagreement between Dizon and Chiu. On July 6, it was announced that the meeting between Sotto and Vice Ganda was related to the unveiling of their upcoming film, The Greatest Showdown, which was confirmed as an official entry to the 2026 Metro Manila Film Festival.

On July 24, 2026, the ninth episode of the Memerimar parody segment during the "Laro Laro Pick" segment drew public criticism after host Vice Ganda, as part of a slapstick comedy routine, spat water onto Showtime Baby Dolls member Johaira Morris before remarking, "Anong nangyari sa 'yo? Ba't nagputik ka?" ("What happened to you? Why do you look like you're covered in mud?"). The incident, which occurred during the "You Gotta Lyric" game, circulated widely on social media, with some viewers criticizing the remark as insensitive and alleging that it demeaned Morris, a Black member of the show's resident dance group, because of her skin tone. On July 25, Vice Ganda released a public apology on social media, acknowledging that some viewers had been offended by jokes made on It's Showtime and the Memerimar segment. The host stated that causing offense was never the programme's intention, apologized to those affected, and pledged that the production would "try to do better." On July 28, the Movie and Television Review and Classification Board (MTRCB) issued a Notice to Appear directing the producers of It's Showtime to attend a hearing after the agency received multiple complaints regarding the July 24 episode. According to the MTRCB, the complaints concerned Vice Ganda's alleged racist and colorist remarks during the Memerimar skit, as well as a separate "lugaw" scene involving Vice Ganda and fellow host Ion Perez. The agency stated that the complaints and its Monitoring and Inspection Unit's report raised questions as to whether the episode complied with Section 3(c) of Presidential Decree No. 1986, which prohibits television programmes considered contrary to law, good customs, public order, public morals, or otherwise objectionable. The hearing before the MTRCB Hearing and Adjudication Committee was scheduled for July 29, 2026.

== Soundtrack ==
=== Showtime: The Album ===
Showtime: The Album

Soundtrack album
- Released: October 2010
- Genre: OPM
- Label: Star Music
- Producers: ABS-CBN Film Productions, Inc. DJ M.O.D.

A soundtrack album composed of five music tracks featuring the It's Showtime hosts was released in October 2010.

==== Track listing ====
All songs produced by DJ M.O.D.

No.	Title	Length
1.	"Showtime Theme Song" (performed by Kim Atienza, Teddy Corpuz, Anne Curtis, Jugs Jugueta, Vhong Navarro)	2:46
2.	"Magpasikat" (performed by Corpuz)	2:04
3.	"Madlang People"	2:51
4.	"Hari ng Dance Floor" (performed by Navarro)	2:57
5.	"We'll Get There" (performed by Curtis)	4:02
Total length:		14:40

=== Isip Bata: The Album ===
Isip Bata: The Album

Compilation album
- Released: November 3, 2023
- Genres: OPM; Novelty
- Length: 32:50
- Label: Star
- Producer: Christian Martinez

Singles from Isip Bata: The Album
- 1. "Totoy Bibbo" Released: October 13, 2023; 2. "Clap Clap Clap" Released: October 13, 2023; 3. "Dalandan Shake" Released: October 13, 2023; 4. "Pamela" Released: October 13, 2023; 5. "Learn the 1, 2, 3" Released: October 13, 2023

Isip Bata: The Album is a compilation album of eleven music tracks featuring the members of the kiddie group "Batang Cute-Po" (then called Showtime Kids) of the show's children's segment "Isip Bata", consisting of Argus Aspiras, Imogen Cantong, Princess Kathryn "Kulot" Caponpon, Jaze Capili, and Lucas Landicho was released on November 3, 2023. The first five singles off the album (Totoy Bibbo, Clap Clap Clap, Dalandan Shake, Pamela, and Learn the 1, 2, 3) were first released on October 13, 2023.

==== Track listing ====
No.	Title	Writer(s)	Original artist	Length
1.	"Chicken Dance" (performed by Imogen, Argus, Kulot, Jaze, Lucas)	Christian Martinez		4:14
2.	"Totoy Bibbo" (performed by Argus)	Martinez	Vhong Navarro	3:02
3.	"Clap Clap Clap" (performed by Kulot)	Jonathan Manalo; Roque Santos	Awra Briguela	2:35
4.	"Dalandan Shake" (performed by Imogen)	Martinez	Navarro, Makisig Morales	3:02
5.	"Learn the 1, 2, 3" (performed by Lucas)	Manalo; Santos; Annabelle Regalado-Borja		0:56
6.	"Pamela" (performed by Jaze)	Martinez	Navarro	3:30
7.	"Step 1, 2, 3" (performed by Argus)	Sunny Ilacad		3:25
8.	"Ang Kulit" (performed by Imogen, Argus, Kulot, Jaze, Lucas)	Martinez; Manalo	Vice Ganda	3:09
9.	"Mag Exercise Tayo" (performed by Imogen, Argus, Kulot, Jaze, Lucas)	Roman Villame	Yoyoy Villame	2:15
10.	"The Teacher and the Pupils" (performed by Imogen, Argus, Kulot, Jaze, Lucas)	Villame	Villame	0:56
11.	"Sayaw ni Vhong" (performed by Imogen, Argus, Kulot, Jaze, Lucas)	Martinez		3:16
Total length:				32:50

== International versions ==
The show spawned its first international franchise in 2019, titled It's Showtime Indonesia, which premiered from March 25, 2019, until May 9, 2020, on MNCTV. It's Showtime became ABS-CBN's first non-narrative format to be franchised by a foreign company.

== See also ==
- Tawag ng Tanghalan
