= Meme (song) =

2026 song by Baby Dolls

Single by Baby Dolls
- Language: Tagalog; English
- Released: September 3, 2026
- Recorded: 2026
- Genre: Novelty; pop; surf rock
- Length: 4:04
- Label: StarPop
- Songwriter: Christian Martinez
- Producer: Christian Martinez

Baby Dolls singles chronology
"Oooh Lala Baby" (2026)	"Meme" (2026)

Music video
- "Meme" on YouTube

"Meme" is a song recorded by Filipino girl group Baby Dolls. It was released as a single on September 3, 2026 under StarPop. "Meme" is a pop, surf rock, and novelty song written in Tagalog and English, with lyrics encouraging the listener to participate in popular dances across different generations such as cha-cha and disco. The track received moderately positive reviews from music critics. Its music video was released on November 6.

== Background and release ==
Baby Dolls first teased "Meme" on August 29, 2026, through a social media post with a caption "Lola? Tita? Ate? Lahat pwedeng maki-Meme!" (lit. 'Grandma? Aunt? Sister? Everyone can do the 'meme'!"') The song was released as a single on September 3. At the time, the group was attracting backlash for frequently releasing covers of existing songs. Some people also questioned their vocal abilities and doubted that the group could maintain the momentum they received from their previous viral singles. A music video was released on November 6, with its visuals earning comparisons to the American film Barbie.

== Composition ==
"Meme" is a pop, surf rock, and novelty song written in Tagalog and English. It contains twangy electric guitar lines with reverberation, a defining characteristic of the surf genre; as well as synthesizers imitating the sound of horns. The lyrics encourage the listener to participate in popular dances found across different generations, such as the cha-cha and disco.

== Reception ==
Professional ratings
Review scores
Source	Rating
Kasing2	7.5/10 stars

The Visayan magazine Kasing2 gave "Meme" a score of 7.5/10, with writer Samantha Radaza praising the Baby Dolls' vocal performances, especially Johaira's; as well as its continued use of the surf rock genre, as previously heard in "Ikembot Mo" (lit. 'Wiggle It'). However, she also believed that the guitars in the song were overwhelmed by the "loud" synth horns. Megas Rafael Bautista called the song "easy on the ears and easier to dance to". The magazine included the song in their curated list of song recommendations for the week of August 31 to September 6.

== Credits and personnel ==
- Baby Dolls — vocals
- Christian Martinez — songwriter and producer
- Albert Tamayo — arranger

== Release history ==
Release date history
Region	Date	Format(s)	Edition(s)	Label	Ref.
Various	September 3, 2026	Digital download; streaming	Standard	StarPop	
