= Oooh Lala Baby =

- Christmas remix cover art

Single by Baby Dolls

from the EP ZoomBaby Dolls
- Language: Tagalog
- Released: July 3, 2026
- Genre: Novelty; bubblegum; dance-pop
- Length: 3:04
- Label: StarPop
- Songwriter: Christian Martinez
- Producer: Rox Santos

Baby Dolls singles chronology
"Ikembot Mo" (2026)	"Oooh Lala Baby" (2026)	"Meme" (2026)

Music video
- "Oooh La La Baby" on YouTube

"Oooh Lala Baby" is a song recorded by Filipino girl group Baby Dolls. It was originally as a part of the group's debut extended play ZoomBaby Dolls. Its music video came out on July 3, 2026. "Baby" is a novelty, bubblegum, and dance-pop song with doo-wop influences. The track was commercially successful, climbing to number one on YouTube's Trending for Music chart and to number 96 on Billboard's Philippines Hot 100.

== Background and release ==
In March 2026, the P-pop girl group Baby Dolls released their debut extended play ZoomBaby Dolls. "Ikembot Mo" (lit. 'Wiggle It') and "Oooh Lala Baby" were released as singles from the album; both of them are covers of songs from the Vhong Navarro film Da Possessed (2014). The music video for "Baby" was released in July 2026, featuring a speed dating concept.

== Composition ==
"Baby" is described as a novelty, bubblegum, and dance-pop song. It is also said to contain "rich" harmonies owing to a doo-wop influence and has been compared to the retro style of girl groups from the 1960s, such as The Marvelettes.

== Reception ==
Writing for The Flying Lugaw, Julienne Loreto considered "Baby" to be "fun to sing along to" but musically less interesting than ZoomBaby Dolls's other tracks.

=== Commercial performance ===
As of July 23, 2026, "Baby" reached number one on YouTube's Trending for Music chart. In the week of August 1, Baby Dolls made their debut on Billboard's Philippines Hot 100 chart with "Oooh Lala Baby", entering at number 96.

== Charts ==
Chart (2026)	Peak position
Philippines (Billboard Philippines Hot 100)	96
