= Arman Salon =

Filipino content creator

- Born: Arman Gatdula Macasusi
- Other name: Mother Arman
- Occupations: Actor; content creator; comedian
- Years active: 2024–present
- Children: 5

Armando Gatdula Macasusi, professionally known as Arman Salon, is a Filipino content creator, actor, and TikTok personality. He rose to fame for his comedic skits and acting videos with his notable lines "Jusko Po! Jusko Po!", eventually transitioning into mainstream television. His content showcases impromptu acting and dialogue reminiscent of the Philippines' heavy dramas, thrillers, and horrors.

Macasusi maintains a significant presence across other social media platforms. In 2025, he has garnered over 328,000 followers on Facebook and more than 15,000 followers on Instagram. As of early 2026, he has accumulated over 548,000 followers on TikTok.

== Early life and career ==
Before becoming a viral sensation, Macasusi worked various jobs to support his family, including selling banana cue and turon, newspapers, pandesal, and fishballs. He then started his salon career and established a salon whom he owned in Rodriguez, Rizal, a place he has had for 10 years. It is where he films his viral TikTok contents.

He gained significant attention on TikTok in 2024, earning the title of the platform's "breakout star" for his relatable comedy. His popularity grew further when veteran actress Charo Santos dubbed one of his videos, which garnered over 5.9 million views.

In 2025, he expressed his grief over the passing of his idol, Nora Aunor, citing her as a major inspiration for his acting style and career.

=== Television and appearances ===
Macasusi has appeared in several television programs, series, and acting challenges. He participated in an acting challenge alongside Nadine Lustre in November 2024. He also appeared on 2024 TV series, Maka, as characters "Bern" or "Fern", and worked with Romnick Sarmenta and Barbie Forteza.

In November 2024, Macasusi was featured on the news magazine show Kapuso Mo, Jessica Soho, where he shared his experiences prior to becoming a content creator and discussed his life raising five children. The show also invited him to GMA Network for a mock audition, during which he performed a face-to-face acting scene with Barbie Forteza.

Macasusi appeared in 2025 television series My Ilonggo Girl as one of the supporting casts.

In March 2025, Macasusi was guest-starred on the food documentary show Pinas Sarap hosted by Kara David for a special, multi-part "Kusina Battle" mini-series.

On the variety show TiktoClock, he hosted a segment called "Salon De Chika". Despite receiving offers to enter politics, he stated in 2025 on program Lutong Bahay that he intends to focus on his career as a content creator and actor.

In October 2025, Macasusi appeared as a guest on Kara David's video podcast, "i-Listen", where they revisited their first meeting on the program Pinas Sarap, and shared details about his personal life.

Macasusi was one of the celebrity contestants in a TV5 reality singing competition, Sing Galing!, which concluded its run on March 22, 2026.

== Personal life ==
Macasusi is a member of the LGBTQIA+ community. He shared that he had a boyfriend before. In 1991, Macasusi had a girlfriend who became a mother of his three children, but they separated. He once again fell in love with a woman who looked after his children, and together they had two children of their own. Yet, similar to his first wife, his second wife reportedly continued to search for what she considered a "true man."

In June 2025, he attended the Reyna ng Bulaklakan parade in Malabon, celebrating Pride Month.

== Filmography ==
=== Television appearances ===
Year	Title	Role	Notes	Ref.
2024	Kapuso Mo, Jessica Soho	Himself	Featured guest	
2025	Wish Ko Lang!	Himself	Guest	
2025	Lutong Bahay	Himself	Guest	
2025	Family Feud	Himself	Guest Player	
2025	It's Showtime	Himself	Guest	
2025	My Ilonggo Girl	Hilda	Supporting cast	
2025	Pinas Sarap	Himself	Guest	
2025	Maka	Fern/Bern	Guest	
2025	TiktoClock	Himself	Guest	
2025–2026	Sing Galing!	Himself	Sing-lebrity	
2026	Eat Bulaga!	Himself	Guest	
