= Ikembot Mo =

2026 song by Baby Dolls

Single by Baby Dolls

from the EP ZoomBaby Dolls
- Language: Filipino; English
- Released: March 27, 2026
- Recorded: 2026
- Genre: Surf rock; novelty
- Length: 3:14
- Label: StarPop
- Songwriter: Christian Martinez
- Producers: Christian Martinez; Rox Santos

Baby Dolls singles chronology
"Ikembot Mo" (2026)	"Oooh Lala Baby" (2026)

"Ikembot Mo" (lit. 'Wiggle It') is a song recorded by Filipino girl group Baby Dolls. Released on March 27, 2026, under StarPop, an imprint of Star Music and ABS-CBN Music, the song serves as the lead single from their debut extended play (EP) ZoomBaby Dolls.

Described as a novelty track with twangy guitars inspired by surf rock music, "Ikembot Mo" achieved significant commercial success in the Philippines, driven by a viral TikTok dance craze that garnered over one million video entries and propelled the track into the Spotify and Instagram music charts in mid-2026.

== Background and release ==
The Baby Dolls, an all-female dance group associated with ABS-CBN's noontime variety show It's Showtime, consists of members Arianne Dela Cruz, Chole Florendo, Johaira Moris, Juby Sabino, Jelai Ahamil, Eriel Reyes, and Ina Ortega. On March 27, 2026, the group transitioned into music recording with the release of their five-track debut EP, ZoomBaby Dolls, designed around high-energy movement and themes of self-love. "Ikembot Mo" was released simultaneously on all major digital platforms as the centerpiece track of the EP.

== Composition ==
"Ikembot Mo"
A 17-second sample of "Ikembot Mo", a novelty track with surf rock production. &Asian's Julienne Loreto wrote that the song's twangy guitars "would make [surf rock pioneer] Dick Dale proud".

"Ikembot Mo" was written and produced by veteran Filipino composer Christian Martinez, with musical arrangement, mixing, and mastering handled by Albert Tamayo. Rox Santos served as the supervising producer.

The song has been described as a novelty track filled with twangy guitars inspired by surf rock music. The British online magazine &Asian compared its production to the songs of the Beach Boys.

== Commercial performance and virality ==
Following its release, the song experienced slow-burn virality on social media. By early May 2026, "Ikembot Mo" officially crossed the threshold of 1 million user-generated video entries on TikTok, making it a major dance craze in the country.

This social media traction translated directly into digital streaming performance. On May 13, 2026, ABS-CBN News reported that the single had officially debuted on the Spotify Philippines Viral Songs Chart, peaking at No. 16. Concurrently, the song entered the Instagram Music charts at No. 40, having been featured in over 16,000 reels. By mid-May, the group's monthly listeners on Spotify surged past 122,000, while the parent EP reached over 364,000 cumulative streams.

== Live performances and promotion ==
The Baby Dolls heavily promoted the track through high-energy live appearances. They performed the track on the main stage of It's Showtime, introducing the official choreography to the public.

To leverage its classification as a fitness anthem, the group launched a localized promotional tour, engaging fans through "Zumba Tours" across major urban areas in Luzon, including events in Quezon City, Valenzuela, and Rizal. They also performed the single live in front of a massive festival audience at the 2026 Aurora Music Festival.

== Personnel ==
Credits adapted from the official liner notes and Star Music releases:

- Baby Dolls – primary vocals
  - Arianne Dela Cruz
  - Chole Florendo
  - Johaira Moris
  - Juby Sabino
  - Jelai Ahamil
  - Eriel Reyes
  - Ina Ortega
- Christian Martinez – songwriter, producer
- Albert Tamayo – arranger, mixing engineer, mastering engineer
- Roque "Rox" Santos – supervising producer
- Carlo Katigbak – executive producer
- Roxy Liquigan – executive producer
- Jonathan Manalo – head of creatives, content, and operations
