= The Flying Lugaw =

Philippine music publication

- Editor: Elijah Pareño
- Staff writers: (see § Personnel for editors)
- Categories: Music
- Founded: 2016
- Country: Philippines
- Language: English
- Website: theflyinglugaw.com (archived)

The Flying Lugaw is a Philippine music publication founded in 2016. It covers local music through reviews, articles, and social media posts, and has organized live music events. The publication focuses on music criticism, underground artists, and the independent music scene.

After operating for almost four years, the publication announced a rebranding to TFL around 2020. Originally a music blog, The Flying Lugaw grew into a team involved in music writing, booking shows, and organizing benefit gigs.

== Activities ==
The Flying Lugaw publishes music reviews and articles about local artists and the independent music scene. Its activities also include organizing and curating live music events.

In December 2025, the publication hosted the TFL Music Club at Chapterhouse in Quezon City. The event included a listening party where attendees could bring CDs, vinyl records, and tapes, as well as a presentation event called "My Favorite Album". The publication has also co-presented music events. On December 19, it co-presented a multi-genre show organized by Sining Shelter to raise funds for the music venue's restoration following a typhoon.

== Personnel ==
Elijah Pareño has served as chief of operations officer for The Flying Lugaw since 2016. The DIY initiative houses live production and media personnel.
