= Rox Santos =

Filipino songwriter and record producer

- Born: Roque Balaoro Santos; October 8, 1985 (age 40); Manila, Philippines
- Origin: Las Piñas, Philippines
- Occupations: songwriter; record producer
- Years active: 2007–present
- Labels: Star Music; Starpop

Roque Balaoro Santos (born October 8, 1985), simply known as Rox Santos, is a Filipino songwriter and record producer based in Metro Manila, Philippines. Santos wrote songs and produced albums for various artists, including: Daniel Padilla, Regine Velasquez, Vina Morales, Vice Ganda, Ylona Garcia, Kaye Cal, Toni Gonzaga, Martin Nievera, Juris Fernandez, Erik Santos, Jed Madela, Angeline Quinto, and Jaya.

== Early life and education ==
Rox Santos was born in Manila, with most of his younger years spent in the city of Las Pinas. Rox grew up surrounded by music lovers, with his grandmother and some of his aunts, uncles, and cousins being musicians.

He later studied at Bicol University, the school where her aunt studied music, graduating with a bachelor's degree in food technology. He became a manager at a nutrition lab soon after. It was not until he met his friend and mentor Jonathan Manalo when his career in music began.

== Career ==
Santos started his career in music at ABS-CBN's Star Music as a project coordinator, a position Jonathan encouraged him to apply to. Santos’ earliest project was the soundtrack album “May Bukas Pa: Conversations of Bro & Santino.” It featured songs from and inspired by the television show May Bukas Pa.

He got his big break when ABS-CBN started developing a remake of the Mexican telenovela “Yo Soy Betty La Fea.” He wrote and produced the theme song for the show, with show lead Bea Alonzo performing. Rox's compositions “Hanggang Kailan” performed by Michael Pangilinan (which he co-wrote with fellow songwriter Cynthia Roque) and Vice Ganda's “Boom Panes,” “Karakaraka,” “Push Mo Yan Teh” and “Wag Kang Pabebe” were all massive hits. He also penned "Ngayong Alam Ko Na" by Liezel Garcia and "Now We’re Together" by Bailey May of Now United. Rox's work with Padilla's albums (namely "DJP," "I Heart You," and "I Feel Good") were all certified.

Santos would also write songs for movies, television shows, and TV commercials. He wrote and produced "Akin Ka Na Lang" for local television drama "My Illegal Wife," "Karakaraka" for the film "Bromance" starring Zanjoe Marudo and the theme for "The Amazing Praybeyt Benjamin." He is behind the theme songs for "Annaliza," "The Love Story of Kang Chi," "Pretty Man," and "I Do" among others. Santos was named label head of the new Star Music sub-label called StarPop. Artists in said label includes Loisa Andalio, Maymay Entrata, Edward Barber, Patrick Quiroz, Ylona Garcia, Kyle Echarri, Maris Racal, McCoy de Leon, Elisse Joson, Kisses Delavin, Rayt Carreon, Chard Ocampo, Andrea Brillantes, Vivoree Esclito, and the music and dance group The Hashtags.

== Discography ==
=== Songwriter Discography ===
Discography
Year	Artist	Album	Song	Co-Writer
2016	Liezel Garcia	Liezel Garcia	Ganito Ba Talaga	
2016	Tim Pavino	Tim Pavino	I'd Do Anything	
2016	Michael Pangilinan	Michael	Tanging Ligaya Ko	
2016	Jolina Magdangal	Back To Love	Sa Panaginip Lang	
2016	Angeline Quinto	@LoveAngelineQuinto	Awit Ng Pagibig	
2016	Ylona Garcia	My Name Is Ylona Garcia	Stop The Bully	
2016	Enchong Dee	EDM	Hopia	
2016	Martin Nievera	3D (Tatlong Dekada)	Pag-ibig Ko’y Ikaw	
2016	Regine Velasquez and Juris	Paskong Puno Ng Kasiyahan	Paskong Puno Ng Kasiyahan	
2016	Vina Morales	Awit Ng Ating Buhay	Buhay Ko’y Ikaw	
2016	Toni Gonzaga	All Me	Only With You	
2016	Angeline Quinto	Higher Love	Ikaw Ang Aking Mundo	
2016	Gimme 5	Gimme 5	Growing Up	
2016	Enchong Dee	Enchong Dee	Tambalang OMG	
2016	Enchong Dee	Enchong Dee	Isip O Puso	
2016	Ai Ai Delas Alas	ADA	Nandito Lang Ako	
2016	Ai Ai Delas Alas	ADA	Ikaw At Ako Bagay Tayo	
2016	Alex Gonzaga	Alex Gonzaga	Ayaw Na Kitang Boyfriend	
2016	Kim Chiu	Chinita Princess	Express Yourself	
2016	Xian Lim	XL2	Pag May Time	
2016	Marcelito Pomoy	Split	Pagmamahal	
2016	Bryan Termulo	Bryan Termulo	Kung Maibabalik	
2016	Bryan Termulo	Bryan Termulo	Lagay Ng Puso	
2017	Vice Ganda	Gandarrappido: The Revenger OST	Gigil Si Aquo	
2017	Regine Velasquez	30th Anniversary Album	Taking Flight	
2017	Awra	Awra	Clap Clap Clap Awra	Awra
2017	Vice Ganda	Single	Hanggang Kailan Aasa	
2017	Vina Morales	Vina Morales: 30th Anniversary Album	Lagay Ng Puso	Vina Morales
2017	Vina Morales	Vina Morales: 30th Anniversary Album	Eres Mio	
2017	Gimme 5	Sophomore	Napapangiti	
2017	Angeline Quinto	@LoveAngelineQuinto	Awit Ng Pagibig	
2017	Jona	Jona	Ano, Bakit, Paano	
2017	Klarisse	Klarisse	Eto Na Naman Tayo	
2017	Migz Haleco and Kaye Cal	This	Bintana Ng Langit	
2018	Jaya	Jaya	Hanggang Dito Nalang	
2018	Patrick Quiroz	Patrick Quiroz	Ikaw Parin	
2018	Erik Santos	Your Love	Don't Go	
2018	Jed Madela featuring BoybandPH	Jed Madela	Be With You Again	

=== Songs Written For Movies ===
- Boom Panes by Vice Ganda co-written with Vice Ganda and Jonathan Manalo (Star Cinema)
- Push Mo Yan Te by Vice Ganda)
- Karakaraka by Vice Ganda feat Smugglaz (Star Cinema)
- Aking Ka Na Lang by Vice Ganda (Star Cinema)

=== Songs Written For Television ===
- Baby, I Do by Juris Fernandez
- ANNALIZA by Roel Manlangit and Liezel Garcia
- Sabay Natin by Daniel Padilla
- Ikaw Na Nga Yata by Kathryn Bernardo
- Ikaw Na Nga Yata Co-written by Christine Daria Estabillo and Vehnee Saturno
- Sana Ngayon Lang Ang Kahapon by Angeline Quinto
- Ngayong Alam Ko Na by Liezel Gracia
- Buhay Ko'y Ikaw by Vina Morales
- Bonggacious by Pokwang
- Kagandahan by Bea Alonzo

=== Albums Produced Under Star Music PH ===
- May Bukas Pa - Soundtrack
- Liezel Garcia - Debut Album
- K-la - Debut Album
- Khalil Ramos - Debut Albun
- Daniel Padilla - Debut album
- Vice Ganda - Debut Album
- DJP - Daniel Padilla
- Vice Ganda - Trending Album
- Enchong Dee - Debut Album
- I Heart You - Daniel Padilla
- Enchong Dee - EDM Album
- Ai Ai De Las Alas - ADA Album
- Kathryn Bernardo - Debut Album
- I Feel Good - Daniel Padilla
- Christmas Love Duets - Daniel Padilla & Kathryn Bernardo
- Love Songs From Princess And I - Various Artists
- Got To Believe Soundtrack - Various Artists
- Bryan Termulo - Debut Album
- Xian Lim - Debut Album
- Xian Lim - XL2 album
- Richard Yap - Debut Album
- Kim Chiu -Chinita Princess Album
- Jovit Baldivino - JB - Jukebox
- Tanya - Debut Album
- Jolina Magdangal - Back To Love
- Ylona Garcia - My Name Is Ylona Garcia
- Michael Pangilinan - Michael
- Richard Yap and Richard Poon - Richard x Richard Album
- Vina Morales - Vina XXX
- Daniel Padilla - DJ Greatest Hits
- Karla Estrada - Karla Estrada Album
- Kaye Cal - Kaye Cal Debut Album
- Yohan Hwang - Debut Album
- Awra - Debut Album
- Klarisse De Guzman - Klarisse
- Volts Vallejo - Debut Album
- Migz Haleco - Debut Album
- Agsunta - Debut Album
- Kim Chiu - Touch Of Your Love

=== Albums Produced Under Starpop ===
- Kisses Delavin - Debut Album
- Elisse Joson & Mccoy De Leon - Mclisse Album
- Patrick Quiroz - Debut Album
- Kyle Echarri - Debut Album
- Maris Racal - Stellar Album
- Loisa Andalio - Debut Album
- Belle Mariano - Daylight
