= Arvery Love Lagoring =

Filipino singer

- Born: Arvery Love Umbac Lagoring; September 12, 2007 (age 18); Lamitan, Basilan, Philippines
- Genres: Ballad; soul; OPM
- Occupation: Singer
- Instrument: Vocals
- Years active: 2023–present
- Labels: Star Magic; ABS-CBN Music

Arvery Love Umbac Lagoring (born September 12, 2007) is a Filipino singer best known for competing in various singing competitions. She competed on The Voice Teens Philippines season 3 (2024), where she joined Team KZ but was eliminated in the battle rounds. She also participated on Tawag ng Tanghalan: The School Showdown, where she finished as the 2nd runner-up. She also part of Tawag ng Tanghalan: All-Star Grand Resbak season 2, where she was initially assigned on Team Amihan, before being reinstated and reassigned to Team Alon and Team Alab and make it to grand finale and placed as a top 18 finalist. In 2026, Lagoring won the 2nd season of Tawag ng Tanghalan Duets with Christian Tibayan.

== Background ==
Arvery Lagoring was born and raised in Basilan, she studied at the Claret School of Lamitan in Basilan.

== Career ==
=== Tawag ng Tanghalan ===
==== Tawag ng Tanghalan season 7 ====
Arvery made her television debut on the seventh season of the amateur singing competition Tawag ng Tanghalan, a segment of the noontime variety show It's Showtime on July 22, 2023. She performed Via Dolorosa by Sandi Patty but was defeated by Daryll Tamayo on the daily rounds.

Songs performed by Arvery Love Lagoring on Tawag ng Tanghalan season 7
| Stage | Performance Date | Song Performed | Original Artist | Score (%) | Result |
|---|---|---|---|---|---|
| Daily Rounds | July 22, 2023 | "Via Dolorosa" | Sandi Patty | 91.4% | Lost |

=== The Voice Teens ===
After competing in Tawag ng Tanghalan's seventh season, Arvery joined on the third season of The Voice Teens, where she performed "Paano" by Dulce during her blind audition. She impressed coaches KZ Tandingan and Martin Nievera, who turned their chairs. However, Tandingan had blocked Nievera, allowing Arvery to automatically join KZ's team, Team Supreme. However, she was eliminated in the battle rounds of the competition, where she lost to then fellow Tawag ng Tanghalan: The School Showdown contestant and grand finalist Hargie Ganza.

Songs performed by Arvery Love Lagoring on The Voice Teens season 3
| Stage | Song | Original artist | Date | Order | Result |
|---|---|---|---|---|---|
| Blind Auditions | "Paano" | Dulce | March 17, 2024 | 10.5 | 2 chairs turned Martin Nievera & KZ Tandingan (Automatically joined Team KZ as KZ blocked Martin) |
| Battles | "Phoenix" | Morissette | April 7, 2024 | 15.2 | Lost to Hargie Ganza |

==== Tawag ng Tanghalan: The School Showdown ====
She later returned as a contender for the eighth season of Tawag ng Tanghalan, titled Tawag ng Tanghalan: The School Showdown, where she represented Claret School of Lamitan. Arvery advanced to the finale, where she performed a medley of Rey Valera songs. She ultimately placed as the season's 2nd runner-up, behind Isay Olarte and grand champion Carmelle Collado.

Songs performed by Arvery Love Lagoring on Tawag ng Tanghalan: The School Showdown
| Stage | Performance Date | Song Performed | Original Artist | Score (%) | Result |
|---|---|---|---|---|---|
| Stage I: Entrance Examinations (Daily Rounds) | August 23, 2024 | "Saan Darating Ang Umaga" | Angeline Quinto | 95.0% | Won |
| Stage II: Preliminary Examinations (Weekly Finals) | August 26, 2024 | "Ikaw Ang Aking Mahal" | Regine Velasquez | 94.7% | Won |
| Stage III: Midterm Examinations (Semi-Finals) | August 31, 2024 | "Tatsulok" | Bamboo | 97.0% | Won |
| Stage IV: Final Examinations (Grand Finals) | January 14, 2025 | "'Di Ka Nag-Iisa" | Regine Velasquez | 97.6% | Won |
| Stage IV: Final Examinations (Grand Finals) | January 18, 2025 | "Sabihin Mo Sa Akin" | Sheryn Regis | Unrevealed | Advanced to Final 3 |
| Stage IV: Final Examinations (Grand Finals) | January 18, 2025 | "Pangako" "Maging Sino Ka Man" "Kung Tayo'y Magkakalayo" | Rey Valera | 92.5% | 2nd Runner-Up |

==== Tawag ng Tanghalan: All-Star Grand Resbak season 2 ====
For her third appearance in the competition, Arvery competed in the second season of Tawag ng Tanghalan: All-Star Grand Resbak. She was initially assigned to Team Amihan and competed on the first stage's sixth day, March 15, 2025, against fellow The School Showdown grand finalist Mary Khem Cabagte (Team Alon), Mariel Rose Reyes (Team Alab), and Rachel Gabreza (Team Agimat). She performed "Muli" by Lani Misalucha and earned an average score of 95.7%, placing second in that day's round. By the end of the first round on March 22, her team was the first to be eliminated. However, a twist allowed three eliminated contestants to be reassigned to the remaining teams. Her teammates, Lee'Anna Layumas, Nowi Alpuerto, and Dior Lawrence Bronia, were placed in Teams Alab, Agimat, and Alon, respectively, resulting in Arvery's elimination from the competition.

During the second stage of the competition on March 26, she was reinstated after Marco Adobas of Team Alon was disqualified for posting a Facebook rant criticizing the show. In his post, he accused the competition of being a "cooking show" and implied that his teammate, Ayegee Paredes, should have won instead of Marko Rudio of Team Agimat. Following his disqualification, the show announced that legal action against him was being considered. The next day, the hosts officially confirmed Adobas’ removal and announced that Arvery would take his place. On the last day of the second round, April 5, her group was once again eliminated from the competition after Raven Heyres of Team Alab defeated their representative, Miah Tiangco, in the tie-breaker round. However, another twist was introduced, where two members from the eliminated group would be transferred to the two remaining groups. Arvery was once again saved by the judges, as she was chosen by Eich Abando of Team Alab, allowing her to return to the competition. Along with her, Tiangco was also given a second chance, transferring to Team Agimat.

On April 12, 2025, Arvery faced her teammate Mariel Rose Reyes for the second time in Resbak Battle round and she wins against Reyes by performing "(Where Do I Begin?) Love Story" by Andy Williams and receives a 98.3% score by the judges making her advance to the grand finals.

April 23, 2025, Lagoring faced Charizze Arnigo, Raven Heyres, Mark Justo, Aboodi Yandog and Lee'Anna Layumas in the grand finals and was defeated by Arnigo and Heyres where she receives 97.6% of judges score by performing "Langis at Tubig" by Jun Polistico placing her 3rd in their battle.

Songs performed by Arvery Love Lagoring on Tawag ng Tanghalan: All-Star Grand Resbak season 2
| Stage | Performance Date | Song Performed | Original Artist | Order | Score (%) | Result |
|---|---|---|---|---|---|---|
| Stage I: Four-Way Face-Off | March 15, 2025 | "Muli" | Lani Misalucha | 6.3 | 95.7% | ~~Lost~~; ~~Eliminated~~; Reinstated |
| Stage II: Three-Way Face-Off | April 3, 2025 | "Gaano Kadalas ang Minsan" | Basil Valdez | 22.1 | 97.3% | ~~Won~~; Saved |
| Stage III: Resbak Battle | April 12, 2025 | "(Where Do I Begin?) Love Story" | Andy Williams | 30.8 | 98.3% | Won |
| Ang Huling Tapatan (Grand Finals) | April 23, 2025 | "Langis at Tubig" | Jun Polistico | 33.5 | 97.6% | Top 18 Finalist |

==== Tawag ng Tanghalan: Duets season 2 ====
For her fourth appearance in the show in December 12, Lagoring joined the second season of Tawag ng Tanghalan: Duets with Christian Tibayan calling their duo as "OST Dreamers". Winning on their daily rounds, they sang "Paalam Muna Sandali" by Darren Espanto. On their weekly finals they advance to the grand finals by performing "Huling Sandali" by December Avenue and earned a score of 99.3% on the judges. On January 16, 2026, "OST Dreamers" performed "Ano'ng Nangyari Sa Ating Dalawa" by Ice Seguerra and earned a 96.4% score by the judges against 88.8% score by "The Produ-singers" and 90.8% by "Bai-Tastic Duo". On January 17, 2026, "OST Dreamers" advanced to final 3 by performing "Sa Ngalan Ng Pag-Ibig" by December Avenue and in the final 3 Lagoring and Tibayan performed "Kapag Ako'y Nagmahal" by Jolina Magdangal and earned 99.6% score by judges making them the grand champion of Tawag ng Tanghalan Duets season 2.

Songs performed by OST Dreamers on Tawag ng Tanghalan: Duets season 2
| Stage | Performance Date | Song Performed | Original Artist | Score (%) | Result |
|---|---|---|---|---|---|
| Daily Rounds | December 12, 2025 | "Paalam Muna Sandali" | Darren Espanto | 96% | Advanced |
| Weekly Finals | December 13, 2025 | "Huling Sandali" | December Avenue | 99.3% | Advanced to the Grand Finals |
| Grand Finals | January 16, 2026 | "Ano'ng Nangyari Sa Ating Dalawa" | Ice Seguerra | 96.4% | Advanced to Final Showdown |
| Final Showdown | January 17, 2026 | "Sa Ngalan Ng Pag-Ibig" | December Avenue | Unrevealed | Advanced to Final 3 |
| Final Showdown | January 17, 2026 | "Kapag Ako'y Nagmahal" | Jolina Magdangal | 99.6% | Grand Champion |

==== ASAP ====
After winning Tawag ng Tanghalan duets: season 2, Lagoring together with her duet Christian Tibayan regularly performing in ASAP.

== Filmography ==
=== TV series ===
| Year | Title | Role | Ref |
|---|---|---|---|
| 2023 | Tawag ng Tanghalan season 7 | Herself / Contestant | |
| 2024 | The Voice Teens Philippines season 3 | Herself / Contestant | |
| 2024 | Tawag ng Tanghalan: The School Showdown | Herself / Contestant / 2nd Runner-up | |
| 2025 | Tawag ng Tanghalan: All-Star Grand Resbak season 2 | Herself / Contestant / Grand Finalist | |
| 2025—2026 | Tawag ng Tanghalan Duets: season 2 | Contestant / Grand Finalist / Grand Champion | |
| 2026 | It's Showtime | Herself / Guest | |
| 2026—present | ASAP | Herself | |

=== Web series ===
| Year | Title | Role | Ref |
|---|---|---|---|
| 2026 | Showtime Online Ü | Herself / Guest | |
| 2026 | Kapamilya Chat | Herself / Guest | |

== Discography ==
=== Singles ===
| Title | Release date | Composer(s) | Producer(s) | Ref(s) |
|---|---|---|---|---|
| "Paulit-Paulit" | February 20, 2026 | Jonathan Manalo & Louie Ocampo | Jonathan Manalo | |
