= The Voice Kids (Philippine TV series) season 4 =

The Voice Kids
- Season 4
- Hosted by: Toni Gonzaga
- Coaches: Lea Salonga; Bamboo Mañalac; Sarah Geronimo
- Winner: Vanjoss Bayaban
- Runners-up: Carmelle Collado, Cyd Pangca
- Finals venue: Newport Performing Arts Theater, Resorts World Manila, Pasay, Philippines
- Companion show: The Voice Kids DigiTV (Digital)

Release
- Original network: ABS-CBN
- Original release: August 3 – November 3, 2019

Season chronology
- ← Previous; Season 3 Next → Season 5

The fourth season of The Voice Kids is a Philippine reality singing competition on ABS-CBN. Lea Salonga and Bamboo Mañalac reprised their roles as coaches, while Sarah Geronimo returned as a coach for the fourth season, replacing Sharon Cuneta who left the show to focus on her other projects.

It aired from August 3 to November 3, 2019, replacing Idol Philippines and was replaced by Your Moment. Vanjoss Bayaban of Team Sarah won the competition, making Sarah Geronimo's second win as coach.

In November 2022, The Voice Kids was renewed for a fifth season that premiered on February 25, 2023.

== Changes ==
The coaches and hosts of the fourth season of The Voice Kids

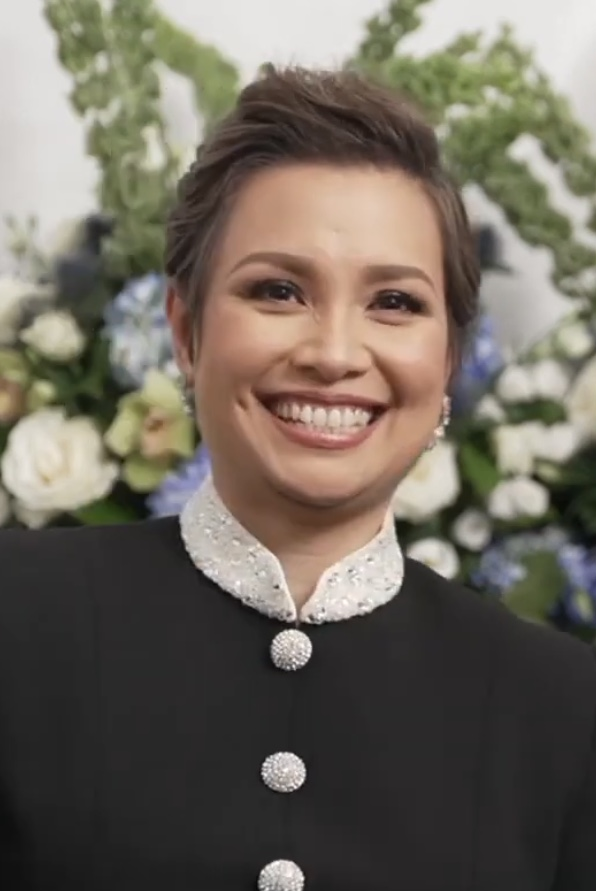
Lea Salonga

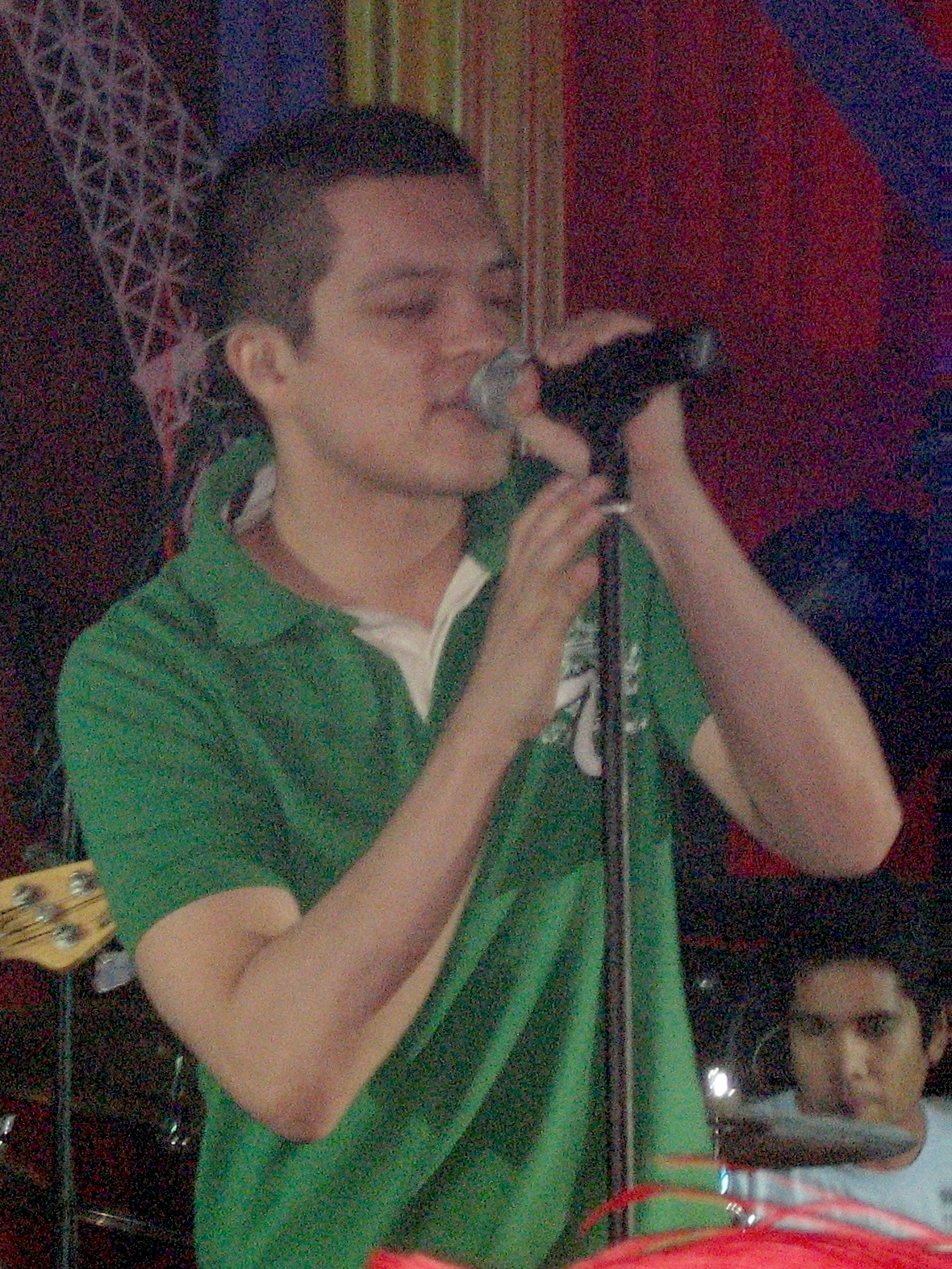
Bamboo Mañalac

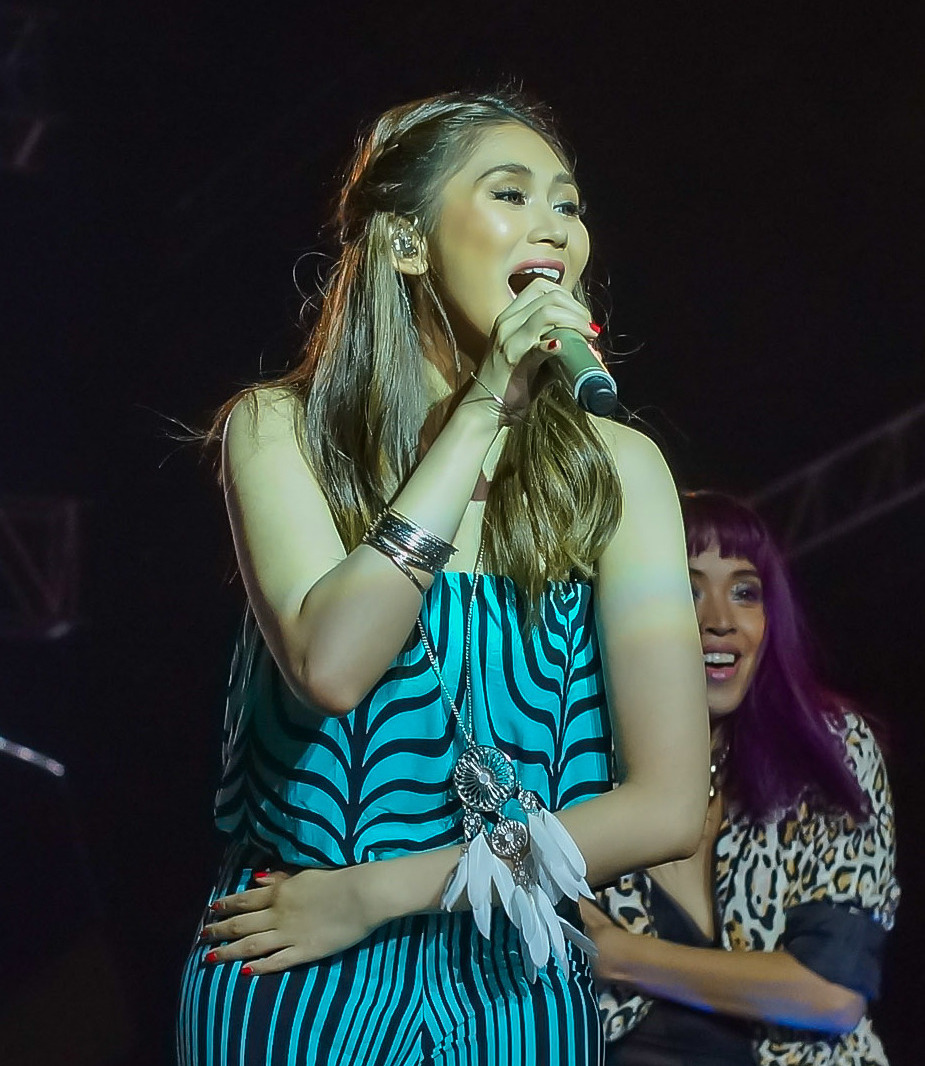
Sarah Geronimo

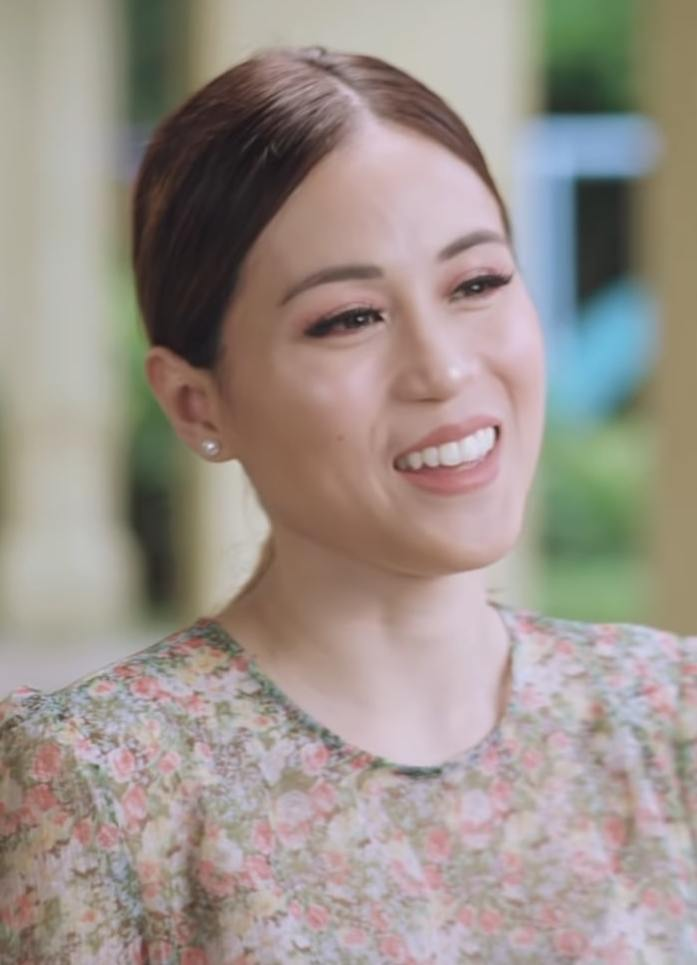
Toni Gonzaga

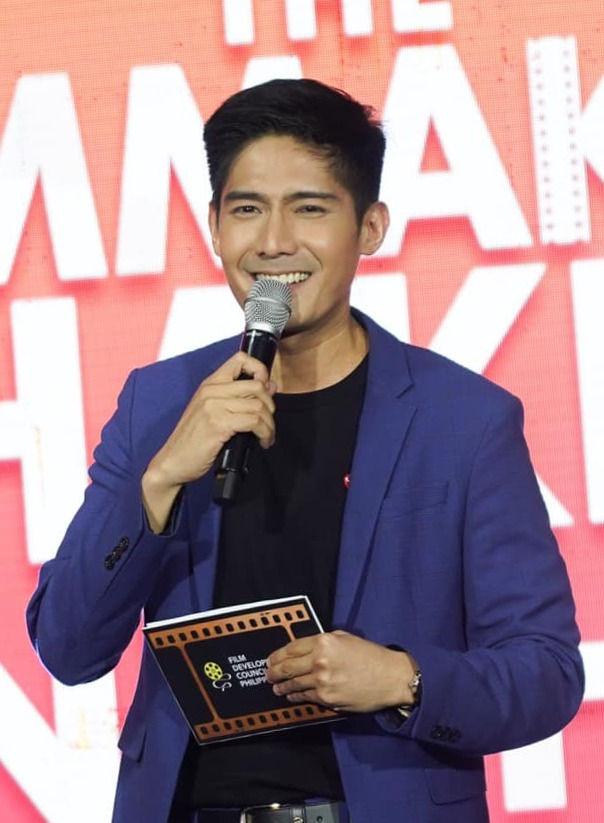
Robi Domingo

=== Coaches ===
In an interview on June 3, 2019, it was confirmed that Sarah Geronimo will return as a coach for the fourth season, replacing Sharon Cuneta who left the show to focus on her other projects. In her post in early July 2019, Lea Salonga confirmed herself that she will return to the show for her fourth season (her overall seventh season in all Philippine versions of The Voice). Bamboo Mañalac will also return to the show as well.

=== Hosts ===
Toni Gonzaga hosted the fourth season replacing Luis Manzano, who has hosting duties with Minute to Win It: Last Man Standing and the second season of I Can See Your Voice. Robi Domingo returned as the show's backstage host. Kim Chiu did not return as the show's backstage host to focus on her upcoming drama series Love Thy Woman.

=== Companion show ===
An online show, called The Voice Kids DigiTV, airs together with the main program on The Voice of the Philippines Facebook and YouTube accounts; it is hosted by comedian impersonator Jervi Li, commonly known as KaladKaren Davila and Jeremy Glinoga of the first season of The Voice Teens. Every episode, a guest co-host is invited more particularly those previous contestants of the previous seasons such as Lyca Gairanod and Elha Nympha.

=== Mechanics ===
In a report on TV Patrol last July 4, 2019, each coach has the power to decide their team sizes, making the first season of the Philippine version to have such change (with the first six versions having team limits). Alongside this new change is the addition of "steals", making the third kids version around the world to adopt this rule (the first one was on the fifth season of the Vietnamese version and the second one was on the fifth season of the German version).

== Teams ==
- Winner
- Runner-up
- Third place

- Eliminated in the Semifinals
- Eliminated in the Sing-offs
- Stolen in the Battles
- Eliminated in the Battles

Coaches	Top 51 artists					
Lea Salonga (FamiLea)						
Lea Salonga (FamiLea)	Cyd Pangca	Gaea Salipot	Alexa Salcedo	Ian Prelligera	Cedrick Ebe	Vera Jagape
Lea Salonga (FamiLea)	Steph Lacuata	Jahris Gabayan	Ced-ced Gazmen	Dexsel Plaza	Jerald Bantilan	Rhed Tabar
Lea Salonga (FamiLea)	Rhaizen Rosales	Precious Lucero	Kyla Valiente	BJ Clark	Kurt Ceda	Johnrey Custodio
Bamboo Mañalac (Kamp Kawayan)						
Bamboo Mañalac (Kamp Kawayan)	Carmelle Collado	Pica Mabitag	Radhni Tiplan	Lovelyn Cuasco	Ramjul Trangia	Jen-Jen Anino
Bamboo Mañalac (Kamp Kawayan)	Frank Magahis	Jhian Quimpo	Chelsea Cabarrubias	Tiffany Vistal	Francis Indonto	Roem Jumawan
Bamboo Mañalac (Kamp Kawayan)	Daniel Alcala	Rockcille Baliton	Lhea Llego	Lovern Apa	Gabby Aromin	Aya Barcenilla
Sarah Geronimo (Team Sarah)						
Sarah Geronimo (Team Sarah)	Vanjoss Bayaban	Angel Andal	Yshara Cepeda	Adah Lenosala	Shekinah Pacaro	Steph Lacuata
Sarah Geronimo (Team Sarah)	Jen-Jen Anino	Gaea Salipot	Renz Aleguiojo	Jay Rome Sevillejo	Angela Ragasa	Cleia Tadena
Sarah Geronimo (Team Sarah)	Amierr Asilo	Keem Lao	Camille Dulay	Ramjean Etera	Riss Binay	Jhoana Quimson
Note: Italicized names are stolen artists (names struck through within former teams).

== Blind auditions ==
Taping for the blind auditions started on June 27, 2019. Each coach can have an unlimited number of artists in their team. The first episode aired on August 3.

Starting on August 11, 2019, all Sunday episodes aired from 7:45pm to 9:00pm.

✔	Coach hit his/her "I WANT YOU" button
	Artist defaulted to this coach's team
	Artist elected to join this coach's team
	Artist eliminated with no coach pressing his or her "I WANT YOU" button

=== Episode 1 (August 3) ===
The first episode was graced by an opening number from the three coaches, along with the Payatas Kids Choir, wherein they sang "Can't Stop the Feeling!" of Justin Timberlake.

Order	Artist	Age	Hometown	Song	Coach's and contestant's choices		
Order	Artist	Age	Hometown	Song	Lea	Bamboo	Sarah
1	Ramjean Etera	7	Malabon	"Nosi Balasi"	✔	—	✔
2	Tiffany Vistal	11	Davao City	"Stone Cold"	✔	✔	—
3	Rainier Oreta	8	Cavite	"Yesterday's Dream"	—	—	—
4	Alexa Salcedo	9	Pasig	"Over the Rainbow"	✔	✔	✔

=== Episode 2 (August 4) ===
Order	Artist	Age	Hometown	Song	Coach's and contestant's choices		
Order	Artist	Age	Hometown	Song	Lea	Bamboo	Sarah
1	Amierr Asilo	10	Batangas City, Batangas	"Achy Breaky Heart"	—	—	✔
2	Biboy Betonio	11	Bohol	"Sweet Child O' Mine"	—	—	—
3	Lovelyn Cuasco	11	Sultan Kudarat	"Saan Darating Ang Umaga"	—	✔	—
4	Vanjoss Bayaban	12	Asingan, Pangasinan	"My Love Will See You Through"	✔	✔	✔

=== Episode 3 (August 10) ===
Order	Artist	Age	Hometown	Song	Coach's and contestant's choices		
Order	Artist	Age	Hometown	Song	Lea	Bamboo	Sarah
1	Jahris Gabayan	11	Cabanatuan	"Saranggola ni Pepe"	✔	✔	✔
2	Rafy Dacer	11	Quezon City	"Kung Di' Rin Lang Ikaw"	—	—	—
3	Kurt Ceda	7	Valenzuela City	"Buwan"	✔	—	—
4	Rockcille Baliton	8	Surigao City	"Banal Na Aso, Santong Kabayo"	✔	✔	✔

=== Episode 4 (August 11) ===
Order	Artist	Age	Hometown	Song	Coach's and contestant's choices		
Order	Artist	Age	Hometown	Song	Lea	Bamboo	Sarah
1	Cleia Tadena	10	Duero, Bohol	"Oras Na"	✔	✔	✔
2	Frank Magahis	12	Balayan, Batangas	"If I Sing You a Love Song"	—	✔	—
3	Precious Lucero	8	Zambales	"I'm in Love with a Monster"	✔	—	—
4	Christian Lumauig	8	Cabanatuan	"Perfect"	—	—	—
5	Angel Andal	12	Antipolo, Rizal	"Sino ang Baliw"	✔	✔	✔

=== Episode 5 (August 17) ===
Order	Artist	Age	Hometown	Song	Coach's and contestant's choices		
Order	Artist	Age	Hometown	Song	Lea	Bamboo	Sarah
1	Khail Samson	8	Antipolo	"Salamat"	—	—	—
2	Francis Indonto	12	Cagayan de Oro	"Isa Pang Araw"	—	✔	—
3	Cedrick Ebe	12	Batangas City	"Ikaw ang Pangarap"	✔	✔	✔
4	Pica Mabitag	10	Davao City	"Hanggang May Kailanman"	—	✔	—

=== Episode 6 (August 18) ===
Order	Artist	Age	Hometown	Song	Coach's and contestant's choices		
Order	Artist	Age	Hometown	Song	Lea	Bamboo	Sarah
1	Steph Lacuata	12	Oriental Mindoro	"Wildflower"	✔	✔	—
2	Dale and Dane Paragas	12 & 12	Isabela City, Basilan	"Dati"	—	—	—
3	Angela Ragasa	9	Isabela	"Proud Mary"	✔	—	✔
4	Kaycee David	11	Alabang, Muntinlupa	"Salamat"	—	—	—
5	Yshara Cepeda	9	Davao City	"Tagu-Taguan"	✔	✔	✔

=== Episode 7 (August 24) ===
Among the auditionees this episode was Ian Joseph Prelligera, who previously auditioned in the previous season under Sharon Cuneta's team and was eliminated in the Sing-Offs.

Order	Artist	Age	Hometown	Song	Coach's and contestant's choices		
Order	Artist	Age	Hometown	Song	Lea	Bamboo	Sarah
1	Adah Leosala	11	Quezon City	"Akin Ka Na Lang"	✔	—	✔
2	Johnrey Custodio	11	Oriental Mindoro	"'Di Na Muli"	✔	—	—
3	Ken Tindog	11	General Santos	"Halik"	—	—	—
4	Gabby Aromin	12	South Africa	"Perfect"	—	✔	—
5	Ian Joseph Prelligera	11	Ligao City, Albay	"Buwan"	✔	✔	✔

=== Episode 8 (August 25) ===
Order	Artist	Age	Hometown	Song	Coach's and contestant's choices		
Order	Artist	Age	Hometown	Song	Lea	Bamboo	Sarah
1	Gaea Salipot	10	Imus, Cavite	"Ngayon at Kailanman"	—	✔	✔
2	Aya Barcenilla	11	Koronadal, South Cotabato	"Ili-Ili Tulog Anay"	—	✔	—
3	Jaycee Wills	7	Biñan, Laguna	"Over the Rainbow"	—	—	—
4	Shekinah Pacaro	11	Zamboanga del Norte	"Rise Up"	✔	✔	✔

=== Episode 9 (August 31) ===
Order	Artist	Age	Hometown	Song	Coach's and contestant's choices		
Order	Artist	Age	Hometown	Song	Lea	Bamboo	Sarah
1	Rhed Tabar	9	Davao City	"It's My Life"	✔	—	—
2	Calli Realubit	7	Dasmariñas, Cavite	"The Greatest Love of All"	—	—	—
3	Lovern Apa	11	Mandaluyong	"Ikaw ay Ako"	—	✔	✔
4	Renz Aleguiojo	12	Lapu-Lapu, Cebu	"Bukas na Lang Kita Mamahalin"	✔	—	✔

=== Episode 10 (September 1) ===
Order	Artist	Age	Hometown	Song	Coach's and contestant's choices		
Order	Artist	Age	Hometown	Song	Lea	Bamboo	Sarah
1	Radhni Tiplan	11	Cabuyao, Laguna	"I (Who Have Nothing)"	—	✔	✔
2	Tricia Cabuatan	11	Calamba, Laguna	"This Is My Now"	—	—	—
3	BJ Clark	11	Olongapo, Zambales	"You and I"	✔	—	—
4	KC Duran	7	Dumaguete	"Kahit Ayaw Mo Na"	—	—	—
5	Carmelle Collado	11	Camarines Sur	"Bituing Walang Ningning"	—	✔	—
6	Ced-ced Gazmen	12	San Mateo, Isabela	"She's Gone"	✔	✔	✔

=== Episode 11 (September 7) ===
Order	Artist	Age	Hometown	Song	Coach's and contestant's choices		
Order	Artist	Age	Hometown	Song	Lea	Bamboo	Sarah
1	Vera Jagape	9	Davao City	"The Greatest Love of All"	✔	—	—
2	El-El Baroga	11	Bacoor, Cavite	"Hindi Na Nga"	—	—	—
3	Riss Binay	11	Bauan, Batangas	"Boulevard"	✔	—	✔
4	Ramjul Trangia	7	Mandaluyong	"You Give Love a Bad Name"	✔	✔	✔

=== Episode 12 (September 8) ===
Order	Artist	Age	Hometown	Song	Coach's and contestant's choices		
Order	Artist	Age	Hometown	Song	Lea	Bamboo	Sarah
1	Koikoi Poligrates	11	Tarlac	"Desperado"	—	—	—
2	Jhian Quimpo	12	Aklan	"Someone's Always Saying Goodbye"	—	✔	—
3	Tracy	N/A	N/A	"Kahit Maputi na ang Buhok Ko"	—	—	—
4	Janly	N/A	N/A	"Narda"	—	—	—
5	Jelai	N/A	N/A	"The Sound of Silence"	—	—	—
6	Jhoana Quimson	11	Pasig	"Iingatan Ka"	—	✔	✔
7	Chelsea Cabarrubias	10	Lapu-Lapu, Cebu	"Break Free"	—	✔	—
8	Dexsel Plaza	10	Bukidnon	"Tunay na Mahal"	✔	✔	—

=== Episode 13 (September 14) ===
Order	Artist	Age	Hometown	Song	Coach's and contestant's choices		
Order	Artist	Age	Hometown	Song	Lea	Bamboo	Sarah
1	Roem Jumawan	10	Zamboanga del Sur	"The Search Is Over"	—	✔	—
2	Rania	N/A	N/A	"Hindi Na Nga"	—	—	—
3	Kyla Mae	N/A	N/A	"Tala"	—	—	—
4	Jandi	N/A	N/A	"Fame"	—	—	—
5	Camille Dulay	9	Bauang, La Union	"Complicated"	✔	✔	✔
6	Keino Encelan	10	Santa Ana, Manila	"Kabataan Para Sa Kinabukasan"	—	—	—
7	Jeirald Bantilan	10	Zamboanga del Norte	"Bakit Ako Mahihiya"	✔	—	✔

=== Episode 14 (September 15) ===
Order	Artist	Age	Hometown	Song	Coach's and contestant's choices		
Order	Artist	Age	Hometown	Song	Lea	Bamboo	Sarah
1	Xyrene Dela Torre	8	Lapu-Lapu, Cebu	"Bituing Walang Ningning"	—	—	—
2	Franky	N/A	N/A	"She's Gone"	—	—	—
3	Bourne	N/A	N/A	"Mangarap Ka"	—	—	—
4	Angel	N/A	N/A	"Salamat"	—	—	—
5	Jen-Jen Anino	9	Talisayan, Misamis Oriental	"Sayang na Sayang"	✔	—	✔
6	Kyla Valiente	9	Ilocos Norte	"Lipad ng Pangarap"	✔	—	—
7	Daniel Alcala	10	Parañaque	"Habang May Buhay"	—	✔	—
8	Lhea Llego	10	Mandaue, Cebu	"Basang-Basa sa Ulan"	—	✔	—

=== Episode 15 (September 21) ===
Order	Artist	Age	Hometown	Song	Coach's and contestant's choices		
Order	Artist	Age	Hometown	Song	Lea	Bamboo	Sarah
1	Keem Lao	10	Lagonoy, Camarines Sur	"Banal Na Aso, Santong Kabayo"	—	—	✔
2	Rhaizen Rosales	10	Lipa City, Batangas	"Ang Buhay Ko"	✔	—	—
3	Jay Rome Sevillejo	12	Dumaguete	"Nasa Puso"	—	—	✔
4	Zandra Pateres	11	Liloan, Cebu	"Rolling in the Deep"	—	—	—
5	Cyd Pangca	11	Quezon, Bukidnon	"Pangarap na Bituin"	✔	✔	✔

== The Battles ==
Each coach is tied with 17 artists in each team. The coaches will pit their artists in trios or quartets for the Battles. The power to steal an artist from other teams is implemented during this season. Each coach is allowed to steal one losing artist from opposing coaches. Artists who win their battle or were stolen by another coach advances to the Sing-offs.

The first episode of the battles aired on September 22, 2019.

Color key

Artist was chosen by his/her coach to advance to the Sing-offs
Artist was stolen by another coach and advanced to the Sing-offs
Artist was eliminated

Episode	Coach	Order	Winning Artist	Song	Losing Artists	'Steal' result		
Episode	Coach	Order	Winning Artist	Song	Losing Artists	Lea	Bamboo	Sarah
Episode 16 (September 22, 2019)	Lea Salonga	1	Ian Prelligera	"Believer"	Kurt Ceda	N/A	—	—
Episode 16 (September 22, 2019)	Lea Salonga	1	Ian Prelligera	"Believer"	Johnrey Custodio	N/A	—	—
Episode 16 (September 22, 2019)	Bamboo Mañalac	2	Carmelle Collado	"Everybody Wants to Rule the World"	Aya Barcenilla	—	N/A	—
Episode 16 (September 22, 2019)	Bamboo Mañalac	2	Carmelle Collado	"Everybody Wants to Rule the World"	Gabby Aromin	—	N/A	—
Episode 16 (September 22, 2019)	Sarah Geronimo	3	Angel Andal	"The House of the Rising Sun"	Riss Binay	—	—	N/A
Episode 16 (September 22, 2019)	Sarah Geronimo	3	Angel Andal	"The House of the Rising Sun"	Jhoana Quimson	—	—	N/A
Episode 16 (September 22, 2019)	Sarah Geronimo	3	Angel Andal	"The House of the Rising Sun"	Gaea Salipot	✔	—	N/A
Episode 17 (September 28, 2019)	Bamboo Mañalac	1	Lovelyn Cuasco	"Mercy"	Rockcille Baliton	Team full	N/A	—
Episode 17 (September 28, 2019)	Bamboo Mañalac	1	Lovelyn Cuasco	"Mercy"	Lhea Llego	Team full	N/A	—
Episode 17 (September 28, 2019)	Bamboo Mañalac	1	Lovelyn Cuasco	"Mercy"	Lovern Apa	Team full	N/A	—
Episode 17 (September 28, 2019)	Bamboo Mañalac	2	Radhni Tiplan	"Walang Hanggan"	Francis Indonto	Team full	N/A	—
Episode 17 (September 28, 2019)	Bamboo Mañalac	2	Radhni Tiplan	"Walang Hanggan"	Daniel Alcala	Team full	N/A	—
Episode 17 (September 28, 2019)	Bamboo Mañalac	2	Radhni Tiplan	"Walang Hanggan"	Roem Jumawan	Team full	N/A	—
Episode 17 (September 28, 2019)	Sarah Geronimo	3	Yshara Cepeda	"Mundo"	Camille Dulay	Team full	—	N/A
Episode 17 (September 28, 2019)	Sarah Geronimo	3	Yshara Cepeda	"Mundo"	Ramjean Etera	Team full	—	N/A
Episode 18 (September 29, 2019)	Lea Salonga	1	Cyd Pangca	"Brave"	BJ Clark	Team full	—	—
Episode 18 (September 29, 2019)	Lea Salonga	1	Cyd Pangca	"Brave"	Steph Lacuata	Team full	—	✔
Episode 18 (September 29, 2019)	Lea Salonga	2	Alexa Salcedo	"ABC"	Rhaizen Rosales	Team full	—	Team full
Episode 18 (September 29, 2019)	Lea Salonga	2	Alexa Salcedo	"ABC"	Precious Lucero	Team full	—	Team full
Episode 18 (September 29, 2019)	Lea Salonga	2	Alexa Salcedo	"ABC"	Kyla Valiente	Team full	—	Team full
Episode 18 (September 29, 2019)	Sarah Geronimo	3	Adah Lenosala	"Tatsulok"	Amierr Asilo	Team full	—	Team full
Episode 18 (September 29, 2019)	Sarah Geronimo	3	Adah Lenosala	"Tatsulok"	Cleia Tadena	Team full	—	Team full
Episode 18 (September 29, 2019)	Sarah Geronimo	3	Adah Lenosala	"Tatsulok"	Keem Lao	Team full	—	Team full
Episode 19 (October 5, 2019)	Bamboo Mañalac	1	Pica Mabitag	"Perfect Strangers"	Tiffany Vistal	Team full	N/A	Team full
Episode 19 (October 5, 2019)	Bamboo Mañalac	1	Pica Mabitag	"Perfect Strangers"	Chelsea Cabarrubias	Team full	N/A	Team full
Episode 19 (October 5, 2019)	Lea Salonga	2	Vera Jagape	"Baklay"	Jerald Bantilan	Team full	—	Team full
Episode 19 (October 5, 2019)	Lea Salonga	2	Vera Jagape	"Baklay"	Dexsel Plaza	Team full	—	Team full
Episode 19 (October 5, 2019)	Lea Salonga	2	Vera Jagape	"Baklay"	Rhed Tabar	Team full	—	Team full
Episode 19 (October 5, 2019)	Lea Salonga	3	Cedrick Ebe	"Kung Ayaw Mo Na Sa Akin"	Jahris Gabayan	Team full	—	Team full
Episode 19 (October 5, 2019)	Lea Salonga	3	Cedrick Ebe	"Kung Ayaw Mo Na Sa Akin"	Ced-ced Gazmen	Team full	—	Team full
Episode 20 (October 6, 2019)	Sarah Geronimo	1	Vanjoss Bayaban	"Anytime You Need a Friend"	Jay Rome Sevillejo	Team full	—	Team full
Episode 20 (October 6, 2019)	Sarah Geronimo	1	Vanjoss Bayaban	"Anytime You Need a Friend"	Renz Aleguiojo	Team full	—	Team full
Episode 20 (October 6, 2019)	Bamboo Mañalac	2	Ramjul Trangia	"I Heard it Through the Grapevine"	Frank Magahis	Team full	N/A	Team full
Episode 20 (October 6, 2019)	Bamboo Mañalac	2	Ramjul Trangia	"I Heard it Through the Grapevine"	Jhian Quimpo	Team full	N/A	Team full
Episode 20 (October 6, 2019)	Sarah Geronimo	3	Shekinah Pacaro	"Best of My Love"	Angela Ragasa	Team full	—	Team full
Episode 20 (October 6, 2019)	Sarah Geronimo	3	Shekinah Pacaro	"Best of My Love"	Jen-Jen Anino	Team full	✔	Team full

== The Sing-offs ==
Artists who won their battle or were stolen by another coach advances to the Sing-Offs. This part of the competition follows the format of the previous season wherein remaining artists pit for one of the three spots per team in the Live Shows.

Color key

Artist was chosen by his/her coach to advance to the semifinals
Artist was eliminated

Episode	Coach	Order	Artist	Song	Result
Episode 21 (October 12, 2019)	Sarah Geronimo	1	Adah Lenosala	"I Am Changing"	Eliminated
Episode 21 (October 12, 2019)	Sarah Geronimo	2	Steph Lacuata	"Heaven"	Eliminated
Episode 21 (October 12, 2019)	Sarah Geronimo	3	Yshara Cepeda	"Sundo"	Advanced
Episode 21 (October 12, 2019)	Sarah Geronimo	4	Shekinah Pacaro	"Your Love"	Eliminated
Episode 22 (October 13, 2019)	Sarah Geronimo	5	Angel Andal	"You Are the Reason"	Advanced
Episode 22 (October 13, 2019)	Sarah Geronimo	6	Vanjoss Bayaban	"The Power of Love"	Advanced
Episode 22 (October 13, 2019)	Lea Salonga	1	Ian Prelligera	"The Impossible Dream"	Eliminated
Episode 22 (October 13, 2019)	Lea Salonga	2	Alexa Salcedo	"Music and Me"	Advanced
Episode 22 (October 13, 2019)	Lea Salonga	3	Cyd Pangca	"When We Were Young"	Advanced
Episode 23 (October 19, 2019)	Lea Salonga	4	Gaea Salipot	"Himala"	Advanced
Episode 23 (October 19, 2019)	Lea Salonga	5	Vera Jagape	"Defying Gravity"	Eliminated
Episode 23 (October 19, 2019)	Lea Salonga	6	Cedrick Ebe	"If I Never Sing Another Song"	Eliminated
Episode 23 (October 19, 2019)	Bamboo Mañalac	1	Ramjul Trangia	"Hari ng Sablay"	Eliminated
Episode 24 (October 20, 2019)	Bamboo Mañalac	2	Pica Mabitag	"Someday"	Advanced
Episode 24 (October 20, 2019)	Bamboo Mañalac	3	Jen-Jen Anino	"Ikaw"	Eliminated
Episode 24 (October 20, 2019)	Bamboo Mañalac	4	Lovelyn Cuasco	"Gising Na Kaibigan"	Eliminated
Episode 24 (October 20, 2019)	Bamboo Mañalac	5	Radhni Tiplan	"Tao"	Advanced
Episode 24 (October 20, 2019)	Bamboo Mañalac	6	Carmelle Collado	"Respect"	Advanced

== Semifinals ==
The Semifinals was held in Newport Performing Arts Theater, Resorts World Manila, Newport City, Pasay.

This season follows the rules of the previous season except that the finalists of each team will be selected by the coaches themselves, as the semifinals were prerecorded, featuring no interactive viewer voting component, and therefore no subsequent results shows. The top three artists (one per team) coming from the selection of the coaches. will advance to the Finals.

Color key:

Artist was chosen by his/her coach to move on to the Grand Finals
Artist was eliminated

Episode	Coach	Order	Artist	Song	Result
Episode 25 (October 26, 2019)	Lea Salonga	1	Alexa Salcedo	"Ligaya"	Eliminated
Episode 25 (October 26, 2019)	Lea Salonga	2	Gaea Salipot	"I Believe I Can Fly"	Eliminated
Episode 25 (October 26, 2019)	Lea Salonga	3	Cyd Pangca	"You Will Be Found"	Advanced
Episode 26 (October 27, 2019)	Bamboo Mañalac	1	Radhni Tiplan	"Love Hurts"	Eliminated
Episode 26 (October 27, 2019)	Bamboo Mañalac	2	Carmelle Collado	"And I Am Telling You I'm Not Going"	Advanced
Episode 26 (October 27, 2019)	Bamboo Mañalac	3	Pica Mabitag	"Nag-iisang Bituin"	Eliminated
Episode 26 (October 27, 2019)	Sarah Geronimo	1	Vanjoss Bayaban	"Makita Kang Muli"	Advanced
Episode 26 (October 27, 2019)	Sarah Geronimo	2	Angel Andal	"Sa Ngalan Ng Pag-ibig"	Eliminated
Episode 26 (October 27, 2019)	Sarah Geronimo	3	Yshara Cepeda	"Wind Beneath My Wings"	Eliminated

Non-competition Performances
Order	Performer	Song
25.1	Sarah Geronimo and her team (Vanjoss Bayaban, Angel Andal and Yshara Cepada)	"Nanay, Tatay"
25.2	Bamboo Mañalac and his team (Radhni Tiplan, Carmelle Collado, and Pica Mabitag)	"Magtanim Ay 'Di Biro"
25.3	Lea Salonga and her team (Alexa Salcedo, Gaea Salipot, and Cyd Pangca)	"Pakitong Kitong"

== Live Finals ==
The Live Grand Finals was held in the Newport Performing Arts Theater, Resorts World Manila, Newport City, Pasay.

There are three rounds – Duet with the Coaches, Upbeat Showstopper, and Power Ballad. The first night has first two rounds, while the second night has the third round and the announcement of results.

With the victory of Vanjoss Bayaban, he is the first 3-chair turn artist to win the Voice Kids, and the second win of Sarah Geronimo as coach (fourth win in all editions of The Voice, and second consecutive win–continuing her streak from The Voice Teens). Coincidentally, Cyd Pangca is the second artist who returned to The Voice Kids that advanced to the finals (and also place third).

Color Key

Artist was proclaimed as the winner
Artist ended as the runner-up
Artist ended as the third placer

Coach	Artist	November 2				November 3		Votes	Result
Coach	Artist	Order	Duet with Coach	Order	Upbeat Showstopper	Order	Power Ballad	Votes	Result
Sarah Geronimo	Vanjoss Bayaban	2	"Habang May Buhay"	6	"Titanium"	1	"You Raise Me Up"	62.11%	Winner
Bamboo Mañalac	Carmelle Collado	3	"Let It Go"	4	"Love on Top"	2	"Bridge over Troubled Water"	24.74%	Runner-up
Lea Salonga	Cyd Pangca	1	"True Colors"	5	"Come Alive"	3	"This is the Moment"	13.15%	Third Place

Non-competition Performances
Order	Performer	Song
28.1	The Voice Alumni (Moira Dela Torre, Jeremy Glinoga, Thor Dulay, Lala Vinson, Elha Nympha, Jason Dy, Morissette, Kyle Echarri)	"Someday At Christmas"/"All I Want for Christmas is You"
28.2	Vanjoss Bayaban (winner)	"You Raise Me Up"

== Television ratings ==
Television ratings for the fourth season of The Voice Kids on ABS-CBN were gathered from Kantar Media, where its survey ratings are gathered from urban and rural households all over the Philippines.

Episode		Original airdate	Timeslot (PST)	Rating	Timeslot	Primetime	Source
1	"The Blind auditions premiere"	August 3, 2019	Saturday 7:30 p.m.	34.8%	#1	#1	
2	"The Blind auditions – part 2"	August 4, 2019	Sunday 7:30 p.m.	35.5%	#1	#1	
3	"The Blind auditions – part 3"	August 10, 2019	Saturday 7:30 p.m.	34.7%	#1	#1	
4	"The Blind auditions – part 4"	August 11, 2019	Sunday 7:45 p.m.	35.7%	#1	#1	
5	"The Blind auditions – part 5"	August 17, 2019	Saturday 7:30 p.m.	32.5%	#1	#2	
6	"The Blind auditions – part 6"	August 18, 2019	Sunday 7:45 p.m.	39.8%	#1	#1	
7	"The Blind auditions – part 7"	August 24, 2019	Saturday 7:30 p.m.	34.6%	#1	#1	
8	"The Blind auditions – part 8"	August 25, 2019	Sunday 7:45 p.m.	37.2%	#1	#1	
9	"The Blind auditions – part 9"	August 31, 2019	Saturday 7:30 p.m.	33.4%	#1	#1	
10	"The Blind auditions – part 10"	September 1, 2019	Sunday 7:45 p.m.	36.5%	#1	#1	
11	"The Blind auditions – part 11"	September 7, 2019	Saturday 7:30 p.m.	36.1%	#1	#1	
12	"The Blind auditions – part 12"	September 8, 2019	Sunday 7:45 p.m.	33.4%	#1	#1	
13	"The Blind auditions – part 13"	September 14, 2019	Saturday 7:30 p.m.	33.2%	#1	#1	
14	"The Blind auditions – part 14"	September 15, 2019	Sunday 7:45 p.m.	33.8%	#1	#1	
15	"The Blind auditions – part 15"	September 21, 2019	Saturday 7:30 p.m.	35.2%	#1	#1	
16	"The Battles premiere"	September 22, 2019	Sunday 7:45 p.m.	33.9%	#1	#1	
17	"The Battles – part 2"	September 28, 2019	Saturday 7:30 p.m.	31.9%	#1	#1	
18	"The Battles – part 3"	September 29, 2019	Sunday 7:45 p.m.	33.8%	#1	#1	
19	"The Battles – part 4"	October 5, 2019	Saturday 7:30 p.m.	32.9%	#1	#1	
20	"The Battles – part 5"	October 6, 2019	Sunday 7:45 p.m.	32.4%	#1	#1	
21	"The Sing-offs premiere"	October 12, 2019	Saturday 7:30 p.m.	31.6%	#1	#1	
22	"The Sing-offs – part 2"	October 13, 2019	Sunday 7:45 p.m.	28.6%	#1	#2	
23	"The Sing-offs – part 3"	October 19, 2019	Saturday 7:30 p.m.	30.5%	#1	#1	
24	"The Sing-offs – part 4"	October 20, 2019	Sunday 7:45 p.m.	27.9%	#1	#2	
25	"Semifinals 1"	October 26, 2019	Saturday 7:30 p.m.	29.0%	#1	#1	
26	"Semifinals 2"	October 27, 2019	Sunday 7:45 p.m.	29.5%	#1	#1	
27	"Live Finals 1"	November 2, 2019	Saturday 7:30 p.m.	33.2%	#1	#1	
28	"Live Finals 2"	November 3, 2019	Sunday 7:45 p.m.	36.3%	#1	#1	
Season average				33.5%	#1	#1	
