= JM Yosures =

Filipino singer and recording artist (born 1996)

- Genres: Pop; Soul; R&B
- Occupations: Singer; recording artist
- Instrument: Vocals
- Years active: 2020–present
- Labels: Star Magic (2021–present); Star Music (2021–present)

JM Yosures is a Filipino singer and recording artist. He rose to fame after winning the fourth season of It's Showtime's Tawag ng Tanghalan in 2021. His rendition of the Maalaala Mo Kaya theme song, was the third and final version to be used by the show before its conclusion.

== Biography ==
JM Yosures is the only child of his biological father—whom he has not met—and his mother, Mylin Padasas, whom was married to Judy Yosures. His biological father left him when he was still an infant. He completed his elementary education in San Juan Elementary School in Quezon City, then subsequently he and his family moved to Taguig City, which eventually he transferred to Kapt. Jose Cardones Memorial Elementary School. He finished his secondary education in Taguig Science High School, and his tertiary education in University of the Philippines Diliman with a Bachelor of Science in Industrial Engineering, which he was a scholar of DOST (Department of Science and Technology).

He has noted as Sarah Geronimo, SB19, Gary Valenciano, Sam Smith, Bruno Mars, and Adele as his favorite musical artists.

== Career ==
Prior to his later triumph, he tried to audition at The Voice, The Clash, Pinoy Big Brother, and Idol Philippines, but was not accepted.

=== Tawag ng Tanghalan ===
On February 6, 2021, after the three-week-long Resbakbakan rounds, Yosures was one of the nine finalists to compete for the title of being the Grand Champion of the show's fourth season. He performed a medley of Lady Gaga's songs, namely "Million Reasons", "I'll Never Love Again", and "You and I", which garnered the highest amalgamated score of 89.5% from the judges and public's votes. He was awarded with a prize money of ₱1 million, a recording contract with Star Music, a management contract with Star Magic, a brand new house and lot from Lessandra worth ₱2 million, and a trophy.

Tawag ng Tanghalan sa Showtime Season 4 Performances and Results (Daily Rounds and Weekly Finals)
Week	Theme	Song	Original Artist	Date	Score	Result
Season 4 Week 7	n/a	"Take Me to Church"	Hozier	August 28, 2020	94.3	Advanced in Round 2 (Highest combined score)
Season 4 Week 7	n/a	"Leaves"	Ben&Ben	August 28, 2020	93.8	Advanced to Weekly Finals
Season 4 Weekly Finals 7	n/a	"Come Together"	The Beatles	August 29, 2020	90.3	Advanced in Round 2
Season 4 Weekly Finals 7	n/a	"Dancing On My Own"	Calum Scott	August 29, 2020	93.8	Advanced to Quarter Finals

Tawag ng Tanghalan sa Showtime Season 4 Performances and Results (Quarter Finals)
Week	Theme	Song	Original Artist	Date	Score	Result
Season 4 Quarter Finals 2	Round 1: Greatest Love	"Piece by Piece"	Kelly Clarkson	November 30, 2020	95.7	Advanced (highest combined score)
Season 4 Quarter Finals 2	Round 2: Klasik Kantahan	"Bulong ng Damdamin"	Marissa	December 1, 2020	96.2	Advanced (highest combined score)
Season 4 Quarter Finals 2	Round 3: Hugot Songs	"Tilaluha"	SB19	December 2, 2020	95.7	Advanced
Season 4 Quarter Finals 2	Round 4: Icon Hits	"Baby One More Time"	Britney Spears	December 3, 2020	96.2	Advanced
Season 4 Quarter Finals 2	Round 5: Kapamilya Hits	"On the Wings of Love"	Kyla	December 4, 2020	94.7	Advanced
Season 4 Quarter Finals 2	Round 6: QuaranTunes	"Skyfall"	Adele	December 5, 2020	99.0	Advanced

Tawag ng Tanghalan sa Showtime Season 4 Performances and Results (Semifinals)
Week	Theme	Song	Original Artist	Date	Score	Result
Season 4 Semifinals	Day 1 and 2: Heart Tatak	"Ordinary People"	John Legend	January 5, 2021	95.7	Advanced (highest combined score)
Season 4 Semifinals	Day 3 and 4: Kabog	"Problem"	Ariana Grande	January 6, 2021	96.0	Advanced (highest combined score)
Season 4 Semifinals	Day 5: Hurados' Choice	"I'd Do Anything for Love"	Meat Loaf	January 8, 2021	95.6	Advanced
Season 4 Semifinals	Day 6: Awit ng Buhay	"7 Years"	Lukas Graham	January 9, 2021	95.7	Advanced to the Grand Finals

Tawag ng Tanghalan sa Showtime Season 4 Performances and Results (Grand Finals)
Week	Theme	Song	Original Artist	Date	Score	Result
Season 4 Grand Finals	Round 1: Journey Song	"Go Up"	SB19	February 2, 2021	99.08%	Advanced (highest combined score)
Season 4 Grand Finals	Round 2: Fight Song	"Sandalan"	6cyclemind	February 3, 2021	96.60%	Advanced (highest combined score)
Season 4 Grand Finals	Round 3: Now or Never Song	"It's a Man's Man's Man's World"	James Brown	February 5, 2021	99.30%	Advanced to Top 6
Season 4 Grand Finals	Top 6 (Dream Song)	"The House of the Rising Sun"	The Animals	February 6, 2021	97.5	Advanced to Final 3
Season 4 Grand Finals	Top 6 (Medley Song)	"Million Reasons/I'll Never Love Again/You and I"	Lady Gaga	February 6, 2021	89.5%	Grand Champion

== Discography ==
Year	Album/Film/Show	Song title	Label
2021	Love Kita Pinas, collaboration with Zephanie and Kritiko	Tara Tena	Star Music
2021	Love Kita Pinas, collaboration with Zephanie and Kritiko	Raise Your Flag	Star Music
2022	PANATA	PANATA	Star Music

=== Television series ===
Year	Title	Role	Ref.
2021	Himig Handog 11th Edition	Live Interpreter	
2021	Tawag ng Tanghalan (season 4)	Grand Champion	
2021–present	ASAP	Main Stay Performer	
2021–present	It's Showtime	Guest Performer	
2021	Maalaala Mo Kaya: Mikropono	Himself/Guest	
2021	Iba 'Yan	Guest Performer	
2021	Magandang Buhay	Himself/Guest	
2025	Tawag ng Tanghalan Duets 2	Himself/Judge	

== Awards and nominations ==
Year	Award	Category	Details	Result
2021	Himig Handog	Best Song	Live Performance/Interpreter	Won, 4th place
2021	LionhearTV	Emerging artists will rise to fame	Via RAWR Pulse Poll	Nominated
2021	Tawag ng Tanghalan (season 4)	Grand Champion		Won

Awards and achievements
Preceded by Elaine Duran	Tawag ng Tanghalan; 2020-2021 season 4	Succeeded by Reiven Umali
