= Lyka Estrella =

Filipino singer

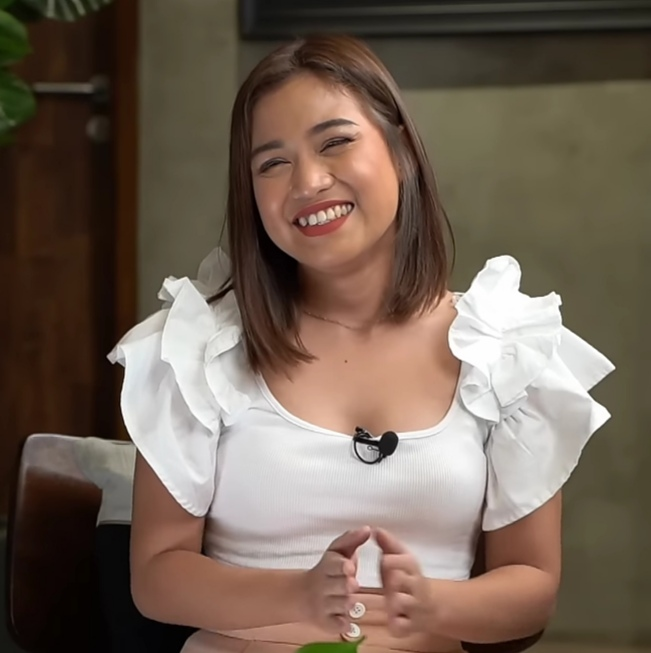
- Estrella in 2023
- Born: Christine Lyka Estrella; December 15, 2000 (age 25); General Santos City, Philippines
- Occupation: Singer
- Years active: 2023–present
- Musical career
- Genres: OPM; pop
- Instrument: Vocals
- Label: ABS-CBN Music

Christine Lyka Estrella (born December 15, 2000) (Note: There are currently no available data for Estrella's birth year.) is a Filipino singer. She rose to prominence after winning the sixth season of It's Showtime's Tawag ng Tanghalan in 2023. She is the recipient of an Awit Award.

== Early life ==
Lyka Estrella was born on December 15, 2000 in General Santos City, Philippines. She began singing at age five and has since joined numerous singing competitions.

== Career ==
=== 2023-present: Breakthrough ===
Estrella competed for the sixth season of the amateur singing competition Tawag ng Tanghalan, aired as a segment in the noontime variety show It's Showtime where she emerged as the grand winner. After the competition, she signed a recording contract with ABS-CBN Music, including a talent management contract with Polaris, a talent agency under ABS-CBN's Star Magic. She became a frequent performer of the variety show ASAP and released her debut single "Hawak Mo", which was the official theme of the romantic drama Nag-aapoy na Damdamin. In July 2024, she became one of the finalist of the annual songwriting festival Himig Handog, where she interpreted the song "Langit Lupa" with Geca Morales and Annrain. Estrella will embark on her first solo concert, Lyka: The Solo Concert, at the Music Museum, where the proceeds will be donated to the children of the Guanella Center.

== Accolades ==
Awards and nominations received by Lyka Estrella
Award	Year (Note: Indicates the year of ceremony. Each year is linked to the article about the awards held that year, wherever possible.)	Recipient(s) and nominee(s)	Category	Result	Ref(s)
Awit Awards	2024	Hawak Mo	Best Performance By A New Solo Artist	Won	

== Discography ==
=== Singles ===
Title	Year	Album	Ref(s)
"Hawak Mo"	2023	Nag-aapoy na Damdamin (Original Soundtrack)	
"Ngayong Alam Ko Na"	2023	RoX5antos: The 15th Anniversary Album	
"Ano? Bakit? Paano?"	2024	High Street (Original Soundtrack)	
"Langit Lupa"	2024	Himig Philpop Finalist	
"Hayy Langga"	2025	—N/a	

== See also ==
- List of Filipino singers
- Music of the Philippines
