= Elaine Duran =

Filipino actress and singer (born 1998)

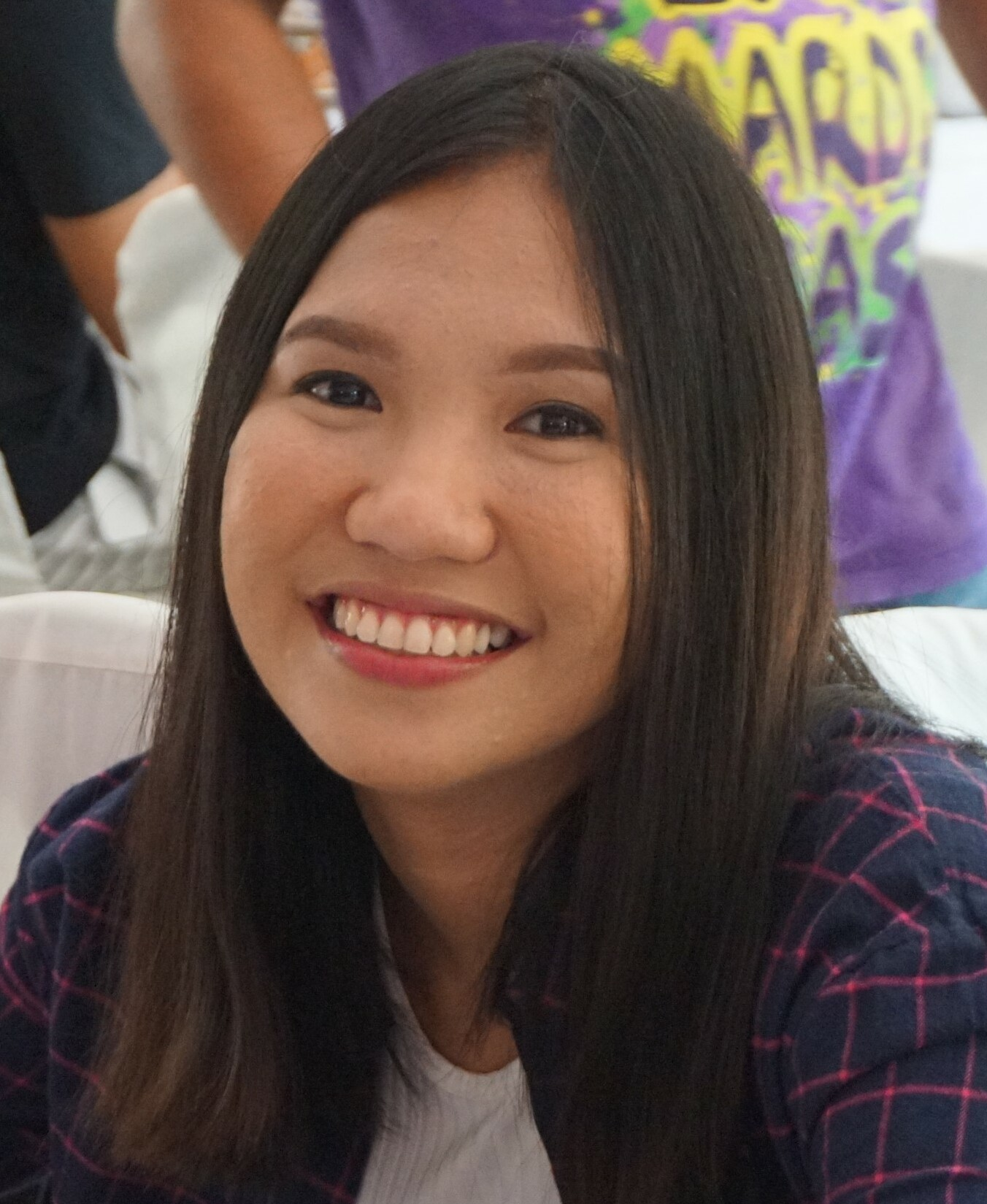
- Duran in 2018
- Born: Elaine Colima Duran; March 14, 1998 (age 28); Butuan, Philippines
- Occupation: Singer
- Years active: 2018–present
- Spouse: Richmond Pengson (m. 2022)
- Children: 1
- Musical career
- Genres: Pop; R&B
- Instruments: Vocals; ukulele
- Years active: 2018–present
- Labels: TNT Records; Star Music

Elaine Colima Duran-Pengson (born March 14, 1998) is a Filipino singer best known for being crowned as the third season grand champion of Tawag ng Tanghalan on the noon-time television show It's Showtime.

== Life ==
Elaine Duran was born on March 14, 1998, in Butuan, province of Agusan del Norte, Philippines. She went to Agusan National High School and she studied Bachelor of Arts in Communication at the New Era University. Elaine's first appearance was at Wil Time Bigtime during the segment Willie of Fortune where she sang "Bukas Na Lang Kita Mamahalin".

== Career ==
=== Tawag ng Tanghalan (2017–18) ===
In 2017, auditioned for the second season of Tawag ng Tanghalan, but was not accepted. She auditioned again during Season 3 and received a confirmation to compete in the first quarter.

==== Daily Rounds ====
On September 7, 2018, Duran participated in the Season 3, Quarter I of Tawag ng Tanghalan on It's Showtime, a singing competition broadcast on ABS-CBN. She was dubbed as "Bida sa Galing ng Butuan City". She sang "Now That You're Gone" by Juris Fernandez where she won as the daily winner. On her last day as the defending champion, she sang her rendition of "When We Were Young" by Adele where emerged the first record holder, after successfully defending the golden microphone ten times.

Songs Performed by Elaine Duran: Daily rounds (Tawag ng Tanghalan Season 3, Quarter I)
Performance Date	Song Performed	Original Artist	Score (%)	Result
September 7, 2018	Now That You're Gone	Juris Fernandez	Advanced	Won (as daily winner)
September 7, 2018	Versace on the Floor	Bruno Mars	96.2	Won
September 8, 2018	If I Ain't Got You	Alicia Keys	94.9	Won
September 10, 2018	On the Wings of Love	Jeffrey Osborne	95.8	Won
September 11, 2018	Hanggang Ngayon	Kyla	95.8	Won
September 12, 2018	I Love You, Goodbye	Celine Dion	96.0	Won
September 13, 2018	Weak	SWV	91.8	Won
September 14, 2018	When I Was Your Man	Bruno Mars	93.8	Won
September 15, 2018	Someday	Nina Girado	95.0	Won
September 17, 2018	Somewhere Over The Rainbow	Judy Garland	94.4	Won
September 18, 2018	When We Were Young	Adele	95.6	Won (1st record holder)

==== Season 3, Quarter I – Semi-finals ====
On September 12, 2018, Duran entered the semi-finals for defending the golden microphone for 5 consecutive days. She became the fourth semi-finalist of the first quarter, also on the semi-finals are John Mark Digamon, Jophil Cece, Windimie Yntong and Ranillo Enriquez. The five semi-finalists competed during the week-long Semi-finals starting October 1, 2018. Elaine's performances received good comments standing ovation like her rendition of "Oo" by UDD. On the last day of the Semi-finals, she earned the highest combined score of 97.57% and advanced to the grand finals.

Songs Performed by Elaine Duran: Semifinals (Tawag ng Tanghalan Season 3, Quarter I)
Performance Date	Theme	Song Performed	Original Artist	Result
Round 1 – October 1, 2018	Audition Song	I Surrender	Celine Dion	Advanced
Round 2 – October 2, 2018	Awit ni Idol	Till I Met You	Kyla	Advanced
Round 3 – October 3, 2018	OPM Hits	Ikaw Nga	South Border	Advanced
Round 4 – October 4, 2018	Hurados' Choice	Oo	UDD	Advanced
Round 5 – October 5, 2018	Himig ng Pasko	All I Want for Christmas Is You	Mariah Carey	Advanced
Round 6 – October 6, 2018	Awit ng Buhay	Through the Rain	Mariah Carey	97.57% (advanced to Grand Finals)

==== Season 3, Grand Finals ====
The twelve grand finalists performed in the week-long competition that took place on September 23–28, 2019 held at the Caloocan Sports Complex. During the first round of the Grand Finals, Duran performed Shanti Dope's Nadarang and advanced to the Top 3, receiving a standing ovation. During the final round, she performed a Basil Valdez medley, which included the songs "Hanggang sa Dulo ng Walang Hanggan", "Sana ay Ikaw na Nga", "Ngayon at Kailanman". She emerged as the Tawag ng Tanghalan Season 3 Grand Champion.

Songs Performed by Elaine Duran: TNT Season 3 Grand Finals
Performance Date	Song Performed	Original Artist	Combined Score (%)
Round 1 - September 23, 2019	Basang-Basa Sa Ulan	Aegis	20.06%
Round 2 - September 25, 2019	N/A	N/A	Safe
Round 3 - September 26, 2019	N/A	N/A	Safe
Round 4 - September 27, 2019	N/A	N/A	Safe
Final round – September 28, 2019	Nadarang	Shanti Dope	(N/A) Advanced to Top 3
Final round – September 28, 2019	Hanggang sa Dulo ng Walang Hanggan, Sana ay Ikaw na Nga, Ngayon at Kailanman	Basil Valdez	(96.11%) Winner

=== Twitter and Youtube Videos ===
Duran's performance videos were quickly viral and top trending for several days. Some of her videos reached over 6 million views and the other videos have racked 2 million views.

At the end of the season, the topic Elaine Duran and Elaine were #3 and #7 trending worldwide on Twitter, while Nadarang, Grabe Elaine and Ellaine were #3 and #13 trending nationwide.

Awards and achievements
Preceded by Janine Berdin	Tawag ng Tanghalan; 2018-2019 season 3	Succeeded by JM Yosures
