= Star Music =

Record label division of ABS-CBN Corporation

- The logo of Star Music (since 2022)
- Parent company: ABS-CBN Corporation
- Founded: February 20, 1995; 31 years ago
- Status: Active
- Distributors: Star Music Publishing (Star Songs, Inc.)
- Genre: Various
- Country of origin: Philippines
- Location: ELJ Communications Center, Eugenio Lopez Street, Diliman, Quezon City, Metro Manila, Philippines
- Official website: www.abs-cbn.com/entertainment/studios/music

Star Recording, Inc. (doing business as Star Music, and also known as Star Records and ABS-CBN Music) is a Filipino record label owned by ABS-CBN Corporation. It was formerly a separate company operating as a wholly owned subsidiary of ABS-CBN until 2013 when it was merged to ABS-CBN Film Productions, Inc. Its music publishing arm in the Philippines is Star Music Publishing (incorporated as Star Songs, Inc.) while outside the Philippines its songs are licensed to Warner Chappell Music.

It is a member of the Philippine Association of the Record Industry (PARI), a non-profit and private trade organization, that represents the recording industry distributors in the Philippines.

== History ==
Star Music was founded on February 20, 1995 as Star Records with the corporate name Star Recording, Inc. The record label was created by ABS-CBN Corporation to diversify its functions from a broadcast to a full media company. Commercial operations of the label started in September 1995, signing an exclusive distribution agreement with Sony Music Entertainment Philippines in the entire country, except in Metro Manila. Due to its distribution agreement with Sony, Star Music endured problems with distributing titles in Metro Manila. In August 1996, the record label engage into licensing deals in order to strengthen its production base and gain entry into the Metro Manila market. It first signed a three-year license agreement with JML Records, a local rock label. The deal enabled the label to gain control of its catalogue of thirty titles. Later, Star Music signed deals with foreign-independent labels such as Beaver Music of the Netherlands, Music of Life of the United Kingdom, and Rox of Belgium.

In October 1996, Star Music renewed its licensing deal with Sony which also includes thirty dealerships in Metro Manila. The deal enabled the label to get a significant presence in Metro Manila's market. By December of the same year, the label's number of signed artists increased to twenty artists. In June 1997, Star Music signed a distribution and licensing agreement with Taiwan's Rock Records, which also involved products from about forty independent European and American labels. Also under this deal, albums by named international artists helped improved Star Music's market profile.

In March 2005, responding to Perceptions Inc.'s Tara Na, Biyahe Tayo, Star Music teamed up with the Philippine Tourism Authority (now the Tourism Infrastructure and Enterprise Zone Authority) for an all-star version of their Pilipino Sa Turismo'y Aktibo tourism anthem which featured most of the label's artists such as Gary Valenciano, Jamie Rivera, Ai-Ai delas Alas, Vhong Navarro, Piolo Pascual, Erik Santos, Gloc-9, Sheryn Regis and Heart Evangelista, with additional speech by some of ABS-CBN's biggest stars at that time including Jericho Rosales, Kris Aquino, Claudine Barretto, Jiro Manio and Charo Santos-Concio. However, the song's lack of extensive support by the mother network led to its obscurity.

In 2007, Star Music launched Acel, the former vocalist of the rock band Moonstar88, as the country's first digital artist.

In 2013, Star Recording, Inc. and Star Songs, Inc. were both merged to ABS-CBN Film Productions.

In 2014, the recording company began to use the Star Music name and logo to reflect its diversification as they launched their very own music downloading website, started to release their songs on iTunes, Spotify, and other music downloading and streaming websites and applications, and revamped the YouTube channel as a response to the current trend in the consumption of music and video contents on the internet as such the labels are now also released digitally aside from recording them for traditional physical media on which the company had begun with. While the Star Records logo was discontinued on that year, the Star Records name, Star Recording, Inc. and Star Songs, Inc. are still used as the company's alternative name, and corporate for the company itself and Star Music Publishing, respectively.

In 2015, the record label celebrated its 20th anniversary. On September of the said year, Star Music acquired the copyrights to around 116 original compositions of Tito Sotto, Vic Sotto and Joey de Leon which includes songs popularized by 1970s group VST & Co., Sharon Cuneta, and Nora Aunor, and popular songs such as "Ipagpatawad Mo", "Tayo'y Magsayawan" and "Awitin Mo, Isasayaw Ko."

On January 31, 2016, after ten years, rapper Gloc-9 signed a record deal with Star Music, the record label who introduced Gloc-9 to mainstream listeners. Two of the most successful albums of Gloc-9, G9 and Ako Si... were released in 2003 and 2005 respectively. These albums brought Gloc-9's biggest smash hits with songs like "Simpleng Tao" and "Hinahanap Ng Puso (feat. Hannah Romawac of Session Road)".

== Sub-labels ==
=== Active ===
- Star Events - concerts and events organizer.
- Star Home Video
- Tarsier Records
- StarPop
- DNA Music
- Lodi Records
- Star Magic Records
- Old School Records
- Inspire Music
- Cat Records

=== Defunct/Inactive ===
- ASAP Music – A sub-label for the television musical variety show ASAP. It was launched in 2006.
- Bituen Ti Amianan - a sub-label caters to the regional (northern) segment of the market.
- Black Bird Music – A sub-label; It is headed by Aiza Seguerra, which is also the label's founder.
- Budget Music - a sub-label for cover versions and multiplexes.
- Dream Music
- Ear Stab - a sub-label for rock and alternative artists.
- Istilo Records - a sub-label for young upcoming artists.
- NuGen Records – A sub label for independent and alternative artists.
- Premium Records
- Startraxx Records – a sub-label for film and television soundtracks.
- Saucy Music - a sub-label for mass-based artists.

== Notable artists (past and present) ==
- 4th Impact (pop group)
- ABS-CBN Philharmonic Orchestra (ensemble)
- Ate Gay
- Absolute Play (band)
- AC Bonifacio
- Acel Van Ommen
- Aegis (band)
- Aiza Seguerra (2007–13, since 2022)
- Akafellas
- Alex Gonzaga
- Ai-Ai delas Alas (2004–2014, 2025–present)
- Aliya Parcs
- Andrea Brillantes
- Angeline Quinto
- Angela Ken
- April Boy Regino
- Ara Mina (1999–2003)
- Ato Arman
- Jennylyn Mercado
- Carmelle Collado
- Bailey May
- Benedix Ramos
- Bernadette Sembrano (since 2020)
- BGYO (pop group)
- BINI (pop group, since 2020)
- BoybandPH
- Bryan Chong
- Bryan Joe
- Baby Dolls (pop group)
- Bryan Termulo
- Bugoy Drilon
- Carlo Aquino
- Carol Banawa
- CJ Navato
- Daniel Padilla
- Daryl Ong
- Dave Anonuevo
- Darryl Shy
- Davey Langit
- Darren Espanto
- Dingdong Avanzado (2001–04)
- Donna Cruz (2016–17)
- Dessa
- Ebe Dancel
- Edward Barber
- Edward Benosa
- Elisse Joson
- Ella Mae Saison
- Enchong Dee
- Erik Santos (since 2004)
- Fana
- Francine Diaz
- Frenchie Dy
- Froilan Canlas
- Fumiya Sankai
- Gary Valenciano
- Generation (band)
- Gerald Santos
- Gigi De Lana
- Gimme 5 (pop group)
- Gloc-9 (2003–06; 2016–18)
- Harana (pop group)
- Heart Evangelista (2002–06)
- Hashtags (pop group)
- Heaven Peralejo
- Imogen Cantong (since 2023)
- Jake Zyrus (2006–10, 2013–18)
- Jamie Rivera
- Janella Salvador
- Janine Berdin
- Janno Gibbs (2018)
- Jaya
- Jed Madela
- Jeffrey Hidalgo
- Jeremiah
- Jeremy G
- Jericho Rosales
- Jessa Zaragoza
- JM de Guzman
- JM Yosures
- Jolina Magdangal (1997–2002, 2014–18)
- Jona
- Josh Santana
- Jovit Baldivino (2010–22)
- Jugs Jugueta
- Juris (2009–21)
- Karel Marquez
- Kathryn Bernardo (since 2012)
- Kaye Cal
- Khalil Ramos (2012–17)
- Khimo Gumatay
- Kice
- Kidwolf
- Kim Chiu
- King
- Kira Balinger
- Kisses Delavin
- Klarisse de Guzman (since 2016)
- Kriesha Chu
- Kristel Fulgar
- Kyla (since 2016)
- Kyle Echarri
- KZ Tandingan
- Laarni Lozada
- Laine Duran
- Lani Misalucha
- Lara Maigue
- Leila Alcasid
- Liezel Garcia
- Lindsay Custodio
- Lito Camo
- Loisa Andalio
- Lyka Estrella
- Maoui David
- Maria Aragon (2011–12)
- Marcelito Pomoy
- Marco Sison
- Marielle Montellano
- Marion Aunor (2013–18)
- Maris Racal
- Maymay Entrata (since 2017)
- Michael Pangilinan
- Michelle Ayalde
- Migz & Maya (duo, 2016–17)
- Mika Salamanca
- Miko Manguba
- MMJ (MM & MJ Magno)
- Moira Dela Torre (2017–22)
- Morissette (2014–19)
- Nash Aguas
- Nikki Valdez
- Noven Belleza
- Ogie Alcasid (since 2017)
- Piolo Pascual
- Rachel Alejandro (since 2021)
- Randy Santiago
- Reo Brothers (band)
- Reiven Umali
- Regine Velasquez (since 2020)
- Richard Yap
- Rivermaya (band)
- Roselle Nava
- Rose Fostanes
- Ryan Tamondong
- SAB
- Sam Mangubat
- Sam Milby
- Sandara Park (2004–06)
- Seth Fedelin
- Sharlene San Pedro
- Sharon Cuneta (since 2017)
- Shanaia Gomez
- Sheryn Regis
- Six Part Invention (since 2018)
- Sue Ramirez
- Teddy Corpuz
- The Company
- Tim Pavino
- Timmy Cruz
- TNT Boys
- Toni Gonzaga (2005–16)
- Tootsie Guevarra
- True Faith (band)
- Vice Ganda
- Vina Morales
- Vivoree Esclito
- Volts Vallejo
- Willie Revillame (2005–10)
- Xyriel Manabat
- Yassi Pressman
- Yeng Constantino (2006–22)
- Ylona Garcia
- Yohan Hwang
- Young JV
- Zaijian Jaranilla (since 2009)
- Zephanie
- Zsa Zsa Padilla (since 2024)

=== StarPop ===
- Alexa Ilacad
- Anji Salvacion
- Ayanna Misola
- Belle Mariano
- Charlie Dizon
- Elijah Canlas
- Gillian Vicencio
- Jordan Andrews
- Justine Buenaflor
- KD Estrada
- Maymay Entrata
- Vice Ganda
- Queenay Mercado
- 1621 BC
- Jarren Garcia
- Kai Montinola
- Will Ashley

=== Tarsier Records ===
- Iñigo Pascual
- Kyla
- Tonie Enriquez
- Sam Concepcion
- Marina Summers
- Sabine Cerrado (credited as SAB)
- KZ Tandingan
- Viñas DeLuxe
- Maki (singer)

=== DNA Music ===
- Nameless Kids
- Trisha Denise
- Kiss N Tell
- Dan Ombao

=== Old School Records ===
- RJZON
- Chloe Redondo
- Kevin Montillano
