= Tawag ng Tanghalan =

Philippine television series

- Current logo
- Also known as: Tawag ng Tanghalan sa It's Showtime
- Genre: Singing competition
- Based on: Tawag ng Tanghalan: First incarnation (1954–1972); Second incarnation (1987–1989)
- Developed by: ABS-CBN Studios
- Directed by: Bobet Vidanes; Boyet Baldemor; John Prats; Jon Moll; Arnel Natividad
- Presented by: Vhong Navarro; Vice Ganda; Anne Curtis; Karylle; Jhong Hilario; Amy Perez-Castillo; Ogie Alcasid; Darren Espanto; Jugs Jugueta; Teddy Corpuz; Ion Perez; Jackie Gonzaga; Ryan Bang; Kim Chiu
- Judges: Rey Valera; Gary Valenciano; Ogie Alcasid; Louie Ocampo; Jaya; Yeng Constantino; Angeline Quinto; Randy Santiago
- Country of origin: Philippines
- Original language: Filipino
- No. of seasons: 17
- No. of episodes: 2,483 (Note: Total as of Kids 1 until Year 10. This does not include the first season.)

Production
- Executive producers: Carlo L. Katigbak; Cory V. Vidanes; Laurenti M. Dyogi; Luis L. Andrada
- Producers: Rose Casala; Olive Zarate
- Production locations: ABS-CBN Broadcasting Center, Quezon City, Philippines
- Camera setup: Multiple-camera setup
- Production company: ABS-CBN Studios

Original release
- Network: ABS-CBN (1958–1972; 1987–1989; 2016–2020); Kapamilya Channel (Note: The series is currently airing on its primary networks All TV (through its ABS-CBN licensing) and Kapamilya Channel as well as other affiliate channels and online platforms via Kapamilya Online Live through Facebook and YouTube. It is also available on-demand via iWant and internationally via The Filipino Channel.) (2020–present)
- Release: 1954 – 1972
- Release: March 8, 1987 – November 26, 1989
- Release: January 2, 2016 – present

Related
- ToMiho: Love Realiserye (as final segment); Drama sa Tanghalan

Tawag ng Tanghalan (transl. Curtain Call, abbreviated TNT) is a Philippine television reality competition broadcast by ABS-CBN. Originally hosted by Jaime dela Rosa, Patsy and Lopito, it aired from 1954 to September 1972 and from March 8, 1987, to November 26, 1989, before its replacement by Sa Linggo nAPO Sila. The show returned as a segment of It's Showtime on January 2, 2016. Vhong Navarro, Vice Ganda, Anne Curtis, Amy Perez, Karylle, Ogie Alcasid, Kim Chiu and Darren Espanto are the hosts. Dubbed as "Your All-Time Favorite Search for Outstanding Amateur Talents", the competition is open to Filipino contestants from Metro Manila, Luzon, Visayas, Mindanao and overseas.

The segment premiered on January 2, 2016, and was successful for the next ten seasons, two kids' editions, one celebrity edition, two all-star editions, and two duet editions. There have been seventeen winners: Noven Belleza, Jhon Clyd Talili, Janine Berdin, Elaine Duran, Ethel Booba, Mark Michael Garcia, JM Yosures, Reiven Umali, Lyka Estrella, Marielle Montellano & JM Dela Cerna of Sidlak Bisdak, Rea Gen Villareal, Kim Hewitt, Carmelle Collado, Marko Rudio, Kent Villarba, Arvery Love Lagoring and Christian Tibayan of OST Dreamers, and Yannie Paul Basical.

== History ==
=== First and second versions (1954–1972, 1987–1989) ===
Tawag ng Tanghalan (originally known as Purico Amateur Hour) debuted as a radio talent-search program on the Republic Broadcasting System's (now GMA Network) DZBB-AM in 1954. Its second incarnation was originally hosted by Frankie Evangelista, Danny Javier and Nanette Inventor and aired on ABS-CBN, with dance and acting-contest portions which supported the main amateur singing competition, from March 8, 1987, to November 26, 1989. Season one ran from March 8, 1987, to January 17, 1988, season two from February 14 to December 25, 1988, and season three from January 15 to November 26, 1989.

Noted OPM artists such as Armand Panlilio, Nora Aunor, Novo Bono Jr., Pepe Pimentel, Edgar Mortiz and Diomedes Maturan were among the winners of the original show. Caloy Alde, later a noted Philippine comedian, joined the second version of Tawag ng Tanghalan in its acting contest.

=== Third version (2016 – present) ===
Tawag ng Tanghalan returned as a daily segment on ABS-CBN's noontime variety program, It's Showtime, in 2016.

== Format ==
From 1987 to 1989 and since 2016, contestants in Tawag ng Tanghalan perform before a live audience and are scored by a panel of judges which includes a punong hurado (head judge) and two to four other judges. If a contestant begins to sing out of tune, the head judge may eliminate them mid-performance with a hand signal to a gong-master who strikes a gong three times (ending the performance). The gong is not used on the kids' editions to avoid discouraging young performers, with decisions based on the judges' scores.

=== Face-off format ===
Adopted in seasons one, two, three, four, six, seven, nine, Celebrity Champions and Kids 1, the face-off format has three or four contestants representing Metro Manila, Luzon, Visayas, and Mindanao. Each performs a self-selected song daily. The contestant with the highest score advances to the face-off round to challenge the defending champion and attempt to win the golden microphone. The contestant with the highest score becomes the new defending champion, and may defend their title for up to ten consecutive days. The gong is not used, and decisions are based on the judges' scores.

If all daily contestants are gonged, no daily winner is declared; the defending champion automatically advances by default. A contestant who wins for five consecutive days qualifies for the semifinals; they may choose to opt out or continue until they are dethroned or have a ten-day winning streak. A contestant with ten consecutive wins enters the hall of fame and receives additional rewards, such as a cash prize, a recorded single, or an advantage in subsequent rounds. Each defending champion receives ₱25,000 per win.

Several versions of the face-off format have been introduced:

- Gong removal: The gong was removed from the kids' editions to avoid disheartening them, and judging relied on the judges' scores. In the first seventeen episodes, all three contestants could challenge the defending champion; eventually, contestants were limited to a five-day defense of the golden microphone.
- Three-way face-off: In seasons seven and nine, a tie resulted in both contestants being declared defending champions; the following day's winner challenged both champions. If another tie occurred, the defending champions continued competing until one was defeated, gonged, or advanced to the next round. This happened several times, including:
  - September 14–15, 2023: RG Mia and Judy Lou Benitez tied; both faced Jaica Cardino the following day. Benitez advanced, and Mia later qualified for the semifinals.
  - September 26–27, 2023: Rgin Deripas and Kenneth Garingo tied; Garingo won the next day, later advancing to the semifinals.
  - December 13–14, 2023: Kline Perez and Aeron Guanco tied; Guanco prevailed the next day, and reached the semifinals.

== Judges ==
Season three introduced OPM musicians Dulce, Randy Santiago, and Zsa Zsa Padilla as judges, with Dulce occasionally serving as head judge. It was the final season of Rico J. Puno, who died on October 30, 2018.

Season four saw the addition of Pilita Corrales to the panel. In season five, Angeline Quinto became a regular judge after a successful guest appearance. K Brosas, Rey Valera, and Randy Santiago did not return due to commitments with Sing Galing!. Klarisse de Guzman joined on June 28, 2021. Jaya announced her departure on July 3, 2021, due to her migration to the United States.

Season six introduced Marco Sison (November 1, 2022), Darren Espanto (February 21, 2023), and Jona Viray (April 17, 2023) as new judges.

In the first duet-edition finale, Mark Bautista and Christian Bautista were guest judges. This edition marked the airing of Tawag ng Tanghalan and It's Showtime on GTV.

Season seven saw the return of the five-member judging panel for daily rounds. Nonoy Zuñiga (July 5), Dingdong Avanzado (July 6), Kean Cipriano (July 7), and Bituin Escalante (July 8) joined the panel.

In the second all-star season, Pops Fernandez, Lani Misalucha, and Regine Velasquez joined the judging panel. Stell and Pablo of SB19 were the first two-in-one guest judges in series history.

Rey Valera stepped down in 2021 due to health concerns. In an interview with Bernadette Sembrano, he said that the guilt and pressure of being the gong-master caused stomach issues which led to hospitalizations and two surgeries. Although he had no conflicts with the show or its staff, he chose to prioritize his well-being and pursue lighter roles in the entertainment industry; his decision was not driven by animosity, but by a desire for a healthier lifestyle and a more relaxed work environment.

Color key:

- Head judge
- Regular judge
- Guest judge
- Appeared on finale only
- Guest mentor/performer
- Former contestant
- Host/presenter only
- Role to be determined

Timeline of Judges
| Judge | Season | | | | | | | | | | | | | | | | | | | | | | | | | | | | | |
| Judge | Year 1 | | | | Kids 1 | Year 2 | | | | Year 3 | | | | CC | GR1 | Year 4 | | Year 5 | | Year 6 | | | Duets 1 | Year 7 | Kids 2 | TSS | GR2 | Year 9 | Duets 2 | Year 10 |
| Judge | Q1 | Q2 | Q3 | Q4 | Kids 1 | Q1 | Q2 | Q3 | Q4 | Q1 | Q2 | Q3 | Q4 | CC | GR1 | Q1 | NN | Q1 | Q2 | Q1 | Q2 | Q3 | Duets 1 | Year 7 | Kids 2 | TSS | GR2 | Year 9 | Duets 2 | Year 10 |
|---|---|---|---|---|---|---|---|---|---|---|---|---|---|---|---|---|---|---|---|---|---|---|---|---|---|---|---|---|---|---|
| No. of members in a panel | 5 | | | | | | | | | | | | | | | | 3 | | | | | | | 5 | 3 | | | | | |
| No. of judges actively serving | 10 | 10 | 13 | 14 | 14 | 17 | 17 | 17 | 17 | 17 | 16 | 17 | 19 | 16 | 17 | 18 | 16 | 12 | 13 | 10 | 12 | 15 | 12 | 19 | 15 | 13 | 13 | 19 | 16 | 15 |
Current judges serving
| Karylle | | | | | | | | | | | | | | | | | | | | | | | | | | | | | | |
| Nyoy Volante | | | | | | | | | | | | | | | | | | | | | | | | | | | | | | |
| Louie Ocampo | | | | | | | | | | | | | | | | | | | | | | | | | | | | | | |
| Erik Santos | | | | | | | | | | | | | | | | | | | | | | | | | | | | | | |
| Ogie Alcasid | | | | | | | | | | | | | | | | | | | | | | | | | | | | | | |
| Darren Espanto | | | | | | | | | | | | | | | | | | | | | | | | | | | | | | |
| Bituin Escalante | | | | | | | | | | | | | | | | | | | | | | | | | | | | | | |
| Kyla | | | | | | | | | | | | | | | | | | | | | | | | | | | | | | |
| Jed Madela | | | | | | | | | | | | | | | | | | | | | | | | | | | | | | |
| Yeng Constantino | | | | | | | | | | | | | | | | | | | | | | | | | | | | | | |
| Klarisse de Guzman | | | | | | | | | | | | | | | | | | | | | | | | | | | | | | |
| Sofronio Vasquez | | | | | | | | | | | | | | | | | | | | | | | | | | | | | | |
| JM Yosures | | | | | | | | | | | | | | | | | | | | | | | | | | | | | | |
| Jonathan Manalo | | | | | | | | | | | | | | | | | | | | | | | | | | | | | | |
| Marielle Montellano | | | | | | | | | | | | | | | | | | | | | | | | | | | | | | |
Former judges
| Rey Valera | | | | | | | | | | | | | | | | | | | | | | | | | | | | | | |
| Bobot Mortiz | | | | | | | | | | | | | | | | | | | | | | | | | | | | | | |
| K Brosas | | | | | | | | | | | | | | | | | | | | | | | | | | | | | | |
| Karla Estrada | | | | | | | | | | | | | | | | | | | | | | | | | | | | | | |
| Mitoy Yonting | | | | | | | | | | | | | | | | | | | | | | | | | | | | | | |
| Jaya | | | | | | | | | | | | | | | | | | | | | | | | | | | | | | |
| Sheena Belarmino | | | | | | | | | | | | | | | | | | | | | | | | | | | | | | |
| Sitti Navarro | | | | | | | | | | | | | | | | | | | | | | | | | | | | | | |
| Dulce | | | | | | | | | | | | | | | | | | | | | | | | | | | | | | |
| Randy Santiago | | | | | | | | | | | | | | | | | | | | | | | | | | | | | | |
| Jamie Rivera | | | | | | | | | | | | | | | | | | | | | | | | | | | | | | |
| Angeline Quinto | | | | | | | | | | | | | | | | | | | | | | | | | | | | | | |
| John Rex Baculfo | | | | | | | | | | | | | | | | | | | | | | | | | | | | | | |
| Julie Anne San Jose | | | | | | | | | | | | | | | | | | | | | | | | | | | | | | |
| Christian Bautista | | | | | | | | | | | | | | | | | | | | | | | | | | | | | | |
| Jason Dy | | | | | | | | | | | | | | | | | | | | | | | | | | | | | | |
| Annie Quintos | | | | | | | | | | | | | | | | | | | | | | | | | | | | | | |
| Roselle Nava | | | | | | | | | | | | | | | | | | | | | | | | | | | | | | |
| Elha Nympha | | | | | | | | | | | | | | | | | | | | | | | | | | | | | | |
| Frenchie Dy | | | | | | | | | | | | | | | | | | | | | | | | | | | | | | |
| JL Toreliza | | | | | | | | | | | | | | | | | | | | | | | | | | | | | | |
| Maloi Ricalde | | | | | | | | | | | | | | | | | | | | | | | | | | | | | | |
| Jeffrey Hidalgo | | | | | | | | | | | | | | | | | | | | | | | | | | | | | | |
| Tutti Caringal | | | | | | | | | | | | | | | | | | | | | | | | | | | | | | |
| Rita Daniela | | | | | | | | | | | | | | | | | | | | | | | | | | | | | | |
| Martin Nievera | | | | | | | | | | | | | | | | | | | | | | | | | | | | | | |
| Gary Valenciano | | | | | | | | | | | | | | | | | | | | | | | | | | | | | | |
| Stell & Pablo | | | | | | | | | | | | | | | | | | | | | | | | | | | | | | |
| Pops Fernandez | | | | | | | | | | | | | | | | | | | | | | | | | | | | | | |
| Lani Misalucha | | | | | | | | | | | | | | | | | | | | | | | | | | | | | | |
| Regine Velasquez | | | | | | | | | | | | | | | | | | | | | | | | | | | | | | |
| Jolina Magdangal | | | | | | | | | | | | | | | | | | | | | | | | | | | | | | |
| Jessica Sanchez | | | | | | | | | | | | | | | | | | | | | | | | | | | | | | |
| Dingdong Avanzado | | | | | | | | | | | | | | | | | | | | | | | | | | | | | | |
| Nonoy Zuñiga | | | | | | | | | | | | | | | | | | | | | | | | | | | | | | |
| Mark Bautista | | | | | | | | | | | | | | | | | | | | | | | | | | | | | | |
| Marco Sison | | | | | | | | | | | | | | | | | | | | | | | | | | | | | | |
| Zsa Zsa Padilla | | | | | | | | | | | | | | | | | | | | | | | | | | | | | | |
| Jona Viray | | | | | | | | | | | | | | | | | | | | | | | | | | | | | | |
| Billy Crawford | | | | | | | | | | | | | | | | | | | | | | | | | | | | | | |
| Teddy Corpuz | | | | | | | | | | | | | | | | | | | | | | | | | | | | | | |
| Kean Cipriano | | | | | | | | | | | | | | | | | | | | | | | | | | | | | | |
| Katrina Velarde | | | | | | | | | | | | | | | | | | | | | | | | | | | | | | |
| Rico J. Puno | | | | | | | | | | | | | | | | | | | | | | | | | | | | | | |
| Claire dela Fuente | | | | | | | | | | | | | | | | | | | | | | | | | | | | | | |
| Pilita Corrales | | | | | | | | | | | | | | | | | | | | | | | | | | | | | | |

== Season summaries ==
Color key:

- Regular seasons
- Kids' seasons
- Special seasons

| Season | | Release | | | No. of Finalists (Note: Finalists only include quarterfinalists, semifinalists, grand finalists, and contenders selected for resbak.) | Grand champion | Second place | Third place |
| No. | Title | Premiere | Finale | No. of episodes | No. of Finalists | Grand champion | Second place | Third place |
|---|---|---|---|---|---|---|---|---|
| 1 | Year 1 (Note: Despite no official subtitle for the seasons, seasons 1, 2, and 3 are often known as year 1, year 2, and year 3.) | January 2, 2016 | March 11, 2017 | ~367 | 23 | Noven Belleza | Sam Mangubat | Froilan Canlas |
| 2 | Kids 1 | March 13, 2017 | June 10, 2017 | 74 | 32 | Jhon Clyd Talili | Keifer Sanchez | Mackie Empuerto |
| 3 | Year 2 | June 12, 2017 | June 2, 2018 | 301 | 37 | Janine Berdin | Ato Arman | Steven Paysu |
| 4 | Year 3 | June 25, 2018 | September 28, 2019 | 379 | 39 | Elaine Duran | John Mark Saga | JM Dela Cerna |
| 5 | Celebrity Champions | October 7, 2019 | November 9, 2019 | 24 | 18 | Ethel Booba | Jason Fernandez | Roxanne Barcelo |
| 6 | All-Star Grand Resbak 1 | November 11, 2019 | December 21, 2019 | 35 | 4 | Mark Michael Garcia | Jex de Castro | Sofronio Vasquez |
| 7 | Ika-apat na Taon | January 4, 2020 | February 6, 2021 | 253 | 36 | JM Yosures | Rachell Laylo | Ayegee Paredes |
| 8 | Ikalimang Taon | February 8, 2021 | September 18, 2021 | 146 | 20 | Reiven Umali | Ian Manibale | Anthony Castillo |
| 9 | Ika-anim na Taon | November 22, 2021 | May 6, 2023 | 411 | 61 | Lyka Estrella | Nowi Alpuerto | Jezza Quiogue |
| 10 | Duets 1 | May 8, 2023 | July 1, 2023 | 48 | 9 | Sidlak Bisdak (JM Dela Cerna & Marielle Montellano) | The Incredi-voice (John Mark Saga & Kim Nemenzo) | The OG's (Anton Antenorcruz & Eumee Capile) |
| 11 | Ikapitong Taon | July 3, 2023 | January 27, 2024 | 173 | 22 | Rea Gen Villareal | Eunice Encarnada | Vensor Domasig |
| 12 | Kids 2 | January 29, 2024 | April 20, 2024 | 64 | 24 | Kim Hewitt | Dylan Genicera | Aliyah Quijoy |
| 13 | The School Showdown | April 22, 2024 | January 18, 2025 | 221 | 47 | Carmelle Collado | Isay Olarte | Arvery Love Lagoring |
| 14 | All-Star Grand Resbak 2 | March 10, 2025 | April 26, 2025 | 36 | 18 | Marko Rudio | Ian Manibale | Charizze Arnigo |
| 15 | Ika-siyam na Taon | April 28, 2025 | November 8, 2025 | 153 | 33 | Kent Villarba | Lucky Nicole Galindez | Angelica Magno |
| 16 | Duets 2 | November 11, 2025 | January 17, 2026 | 46 | 20 | OST Dreamers (Arvery Love Lagoring & Christian Tibayan) | Jezzian (Jezza Quiogue & Ian Manibale) | Pang Mala-Cousins (Mark Justo & JR Oclarit) |
| 17 | Ika-Sampung Taon | January 19, 2026 | June 13, 2026 | 119 | 33 | Yannie Paul Basical | Charlie Palalisan | Jeanel Silvestre |
| 18 | The School Showdown 2 | Future event | | | | | | |

=== Season 1 (2016–2017) ===
The first season premiered on January 2, 2016. Rey Valera was the main head judge for this season, with Louie Ocampo, Jaya, Ogie Alcasid, Yeng Constantino serving as substitute head judges. Billy Crawford, Karylle, Karla Estrada, K Brosas, Nyoy Volante, Mitoy Yonting, Rico J. Puno, Bobot Mortiz, Erik Santos, Kyla were the judges for the series. The season ended on March 11, 2017, at the Newport Performing Arts Theater, Resorts World Manila in Pasay, when Noven Belleza of Visayas was the season's grand champion.

=== Kids 1 (2017) ===
Tawag ng Tanghalan Kids was a special edition for aspiring Filipino singers aged 7 to 13. Auditions for this season began on December 4, 2016. The season premiered on March 13, 2017. It ended on June 10 of that year at ABS-CBN Studio 3, when Jhon Clyd Talili of Mindanao was the grand champion.

=== Season 2 (2017–2018) ===
The second season premiered on June 12, 2017. Gary Valenciano was added to the judging panel. It was the first season with Global Tawag ng Tanghalan, a round for Filipino contestants from other countries. The season ended on June 2, 2018, at Aliw Theater in Pasay, when Janine Berdin from Visayas was the season's grand champion.

=== Season 3 (2018–2019) ===
The third season premiered on June 25, 2018. The competition's 1975 champion Dulce, Randy Santiago and Zsa Zsa Padilla were added to the judging panel. The season ended on September 28, 2019, at the Caloocan Sports Complex in Bagumbong, Caloocan, when Elaine Duran of Mindanao was the season's grand champion.

=== Celebrity Champions (2019) ===
Tawag ng Tanghalan: Celebrity Champions was a special series featuring celebrities competing to become the series' first Celebrity Grand Champion. It aired on October 7, 2019, as part of the month-long celebration of It's Showtime's 10th anniversary. It ended on November 9 of that year at ABS-CBN Studio 3, where Ethel Booba of Mindanao was the grand champion.

=== All-Star Grand Resbak (2019) ===
In Tawag ng Tanghalan: All-Star Grand Resbak, contestants from past seasons who had failed to advance to the grand finals vied to become the series' first Grand Resbak champion. It premiered on November 11, 2019 and ended on December 21 of that year at ABS-CBN Studio 3, where Mark Michael Garcia of Metro Manila was the grand champion.

=== Ika-apat na Taon (2020–2021) ===
The series' fourth season premiered on January 4, 2020, and Pilita Corrales was added to the panel of judges. The season was put on hold March 15, 2020, due to the lockdown caused by the COVID-19 pandemic and on May 5 due to a network shutdown. The season resumed on June 13, 2020, three months after the Luzon lockdown. It ended on February 6, 2021, at ABS-CBN Studio 10 in Quezon City, when JM Yosures of Metro Manila became grand champion.

=== Ikalimang Taon (2021) ===
The fifth season premiered on February 8, 2021. Klarisse de Guzman and Angeline Quinto were added to the judging panel after Quinto was a guest judge during the previous season.

From March 18 to April 10, the season was halted when ABS-CBN decided to suspend daily live programs due to a surge of COVID-19 cases in the Greater Manila Area. It ended on September 18 at ABS-CBN Studio 3, where Reiven Umali of Luzon became grand champion. While Adrian Manibale and Anthony Castillo, both from Metro Manila, finished as 2nd and 3rd places respectively. The season lasted seven months, the series' shortest.

=== Ika-anim na Taon (2021–2023) ===
The sixth season premiered on November 22, 2021. Marco Sison, Darren Espanto, and Jona Viray were added to the judging panel.

The season was suspended from January 6 to 15, 2022, due to another surge in COVID-19 cases, and resumed on January 17. It ended on May 6, 2023, at ABS-CBN Studio 10, where Lyka Estrella of Mindanao became grand champion. Nowi Alpuerto and Jezza Quioge, both from Luzon, ended as 2nd and 3rd places respectively. The 18-month season is the series' longest.

=== Duets 1 (2023) ===
In Tawag ng Tanghalan: Duets, contestants from previous seasons returned for a duet-style competition. It premiered on May 8, 2023, two days after the sixth-season finale. Originally scheduled to run for four weeks as an interim segment before the seventh season, it was extended to eight weeks. This was the last season to air on TV5 and the first season to air on GTV. It ended on July 1, 2023, at ABS-CBN Studio 10, when the Sidlak Bisdak duo of Marielle Montellano and JM Dela Cerna were declared winners.

=== Ikapitong Taon (2023–2024) ===
The seventh season premiered on July 3, 2023. Nonoy Zuñiga, Dingdong Avanzado, Kean Cipriano, and Bituin Escalante were added to the panel of judges. The season was suspended from October 14 to 27, 2023, by a Movie and Television Review and Classification Board decision. The season returned on October 30, 2023. It ended on January 27, 2024, at ABS-CBN Studio 10, when Vensor Domasig from Visayas became 3rd place, Eunice Encarnada of Mindanao became 2nd place and Rea Gen Villareal of Metro Manila became grand champion.

=== Kids 2 (2024) ===
The second season of Tawag ng Tanghalan Kids premiered on January 29, 2024, almost seven years after the first Kids season. It ended on April 20 at ABS-CBN Studio 10, when Kim Hewitt of Visayas became grand champion.

=== School Showdown (2024–2025) ===
In the eighth season, Tawag ng Tanghalan: The School Showdown, students from universities in the Philippines competed to become the season's grand champion. Preliminary auditions, held with the ninth season, began on April 15, 2024. It was the first regular season with the format first used during the second Kids season, and the first to air on both All TV and GMA Network. The season ended on January 18, 2025, at ABS-CBN Studio 10, where Carmelle Collado of King Thomas Learning Academy was named grand champion. Isay Olarte of City College of Calapan was runner-up, and Arvery Love Lagoring of Claret School of Lamitan finished third.

=== All-Star Grand Resbak 2025 ===
The second all-star season, Tawag ng Tanghalan: All-Star Grand Resbak 2025, premiered on March 10, 2025 (five years after the first all-star season). It was the first all-star season to air on both All TV and GMA Network. Pops Fernandez, Lani Misalucha, and Regine Velasquez were added to the panel of judges. Stell and Pablo of SB19 became the first two-in-one guest judges in series history. The season ended on April 26, 2025, with Marko Rudio of Team Agimat becoming grand champion. Ian Manibale of Team Alab was the runner-up, and Charizze Arnigo of Team Agimat finished third.

=== Ika-9 na Taon (2025) ===
The ninth season premiered on April 28, 2025, two days after the second all-star season ended. Preliminary auditions began on February 3. The season concluded on November 8 at ABS-CBN Studio 10, when Kent Villarba of Visayas became grand champion. Lucky Nicole Galindez and Angelica Magno, both from Mindanao, placed second and third.

=== Duets 2 (2025–2026) ===
The second season of Tawag ng Tanghalan: Duets premiered on November 11, 2025. It ended on January 17, 2026, at ABS-CBN Studio 3, where the OST Dreamers duo of Arvery Love Lagoring and Christian Tibayan were declared winners. It was the first duets season to air on both All TV and GMA Network.

=== Ika-Sampung Taon (2026) ===
The tenth season premiered on January 19, 2026. Auditions for the season, announced on December 29, 2025, and began on January 2, 2026. It ended on June 13, 2026, with Yannie Paul Basical of Region 3 (Central Luzon) as the winner.

=== School Showdown 2 (2026–2027) ===
For its eleventh season, Tawag ng Tanghalan will hold a second "School Showdown" edition.

== Controversy ==
=== Season 1 ===
Judge Rey Valera was criticized by viewers and critics for his comments to contestants about their physical appearance, body-shaming female contestants and failing to focus on contestants' vocal skills. Karla Estrada's qualifications as judge were questioned by viewers. Judges' scores and text-voting results were criticized by viewers for a lack of transparency, a system which failed to confirm their votes by SMS, and unfair judging In the 2017 grand final, actress Nora Aunor was scheduled to be the special judge but withdrew at the last minute due to a conflict with host Vice Ganda.

=== Season 2 ===
In the May 22, 2018 Ultimate Resbak rounds, Ato Arman and Aila Santos, Arman advanced to the second round. However, Jaya received negative backlash due to Santos' defeat. The next day, Vice Ganda defended Jaya, however, and said that she was one of the two judges who voted for Santos.

=== Season 3 ===
Tawag ng Tanghalan has been cited since 2018 as a factor in the longer airtime of It's Showtime, which delays ABS-CBN's afternoon and prime-time programs. Semifinalist Shantal Cuizon posted a controversial tweet, saying "Composer ka lang" and "Hustisya." After she apologized, her post was deleted and her Twitter account deactivated.

After the second round of September 11, 2019 songs by Mariane Osabel and Mariko Ledesma, Ledesma took the seat of power. When the split-scoring screen appeared, Osabel's score was 16.50 percent and Ledesma's was 50 percent. The allegedly-rigged results were noted on Twitter. Three days later, judge Dulce addressed the controversial result. Osabel withdrew from the Final Resbak due to health issues, and Ledesma withdrew because of the public backlash.

=== 2025 All-Star Grand Resbak ===
In a March 26, 2025 Facebook post, Marco Adobas called Tawag ng Tanghalan a "cooking show" (implying that the winner was predetermined). Before announcing results, the hosts had said that a tie occurred and the judges had to break it (since only one winner was allowed per round). After the results were announced, Adobas said that Ayegee Paredes (his teammate on Team Alon) should have won instead of Marko Rudio of Team Agimat. He later deleted the post. The following day, producers discussed the possibility of removing Adobas for violating the rules and considered filing a lawsuit against him. At the end of that day's episode, it was announced that he had been disqualified from the competition. Adobas, replaced by Arvery Love Lagoring of the eliminated Team Amihan, later apologized for the post.

== Concerts ==
| Date | Title | Venue | Country | Starring | Director | Ref. |
|---|---|---|---|---|---|---|
| July 28, 2018 | TNT All Star Showdown | Smart Araneta Coliseum, Cubao, Quezon City | Philippines | TNT Artists | Joane Laygo | |
| September 21, 2018 | TNT All Star Showdown Cebu | Hoops Dome, Lapu-Lapu City, Cebu | Philippines | TNT Artists | Joane Laygo | |
| November 30, 2018 | Listen: The Big Shot Concert | Smart Araneta Coliseum, Cubao, Quezon City | Philippines | Francis Concepcion, Mackie Empuerto and Keifer Sanchez of TNT Boys | Bobet Vidanes | |
| April 25, 2019 | Listen: The World Tour | The Theatre at Ace Hotel, Los Angeles, California | United States | Francis Concepcion, Mackie Empuerto and Keifer Sanchez of TNT Boys | | |
| April 27, 2019 | Listen: The World Tour | Edmonton Expo Centre, Alberta | Canada | Francis Concepcion, Mackie Empuerto and Keifer Sanchez of TNT Boys | | |
| May 2, 2019^{1} | Listen: The World Tour | Chabot College, Hayward, California | United States | Francis Concepcion, Mackie Empuerto and Keifer Sanchez of TNT Boys | | |
| December 13, 2019 | TNT Unplugged | ABS-CBN Dolphy Theatre | Philippines | Elaine Duran; John Mark Saga; JM Dela Cerna | | |
| April 27, 2024 | NewGen Champs | Music Museum | Philippines | JM Yosures; Lyka Estrella; Reiven Umali; Rea Gen Villareal; Marielle Montellano; JM Dela Cerna; Khimo | | |
| May 9, 2025 | BRAVO!: Voices of the Filipino | Alex Theatre, Glendale, California | United States | Sofronio Vasquez; Jed Madela; Bituin Escalante; Lyka Estrella | | |
| May 11, 2025 | BRAVO!: Voices of the Filipino | City National Grove of Anaheim, Anaheim, California | United States | Sofronio Vasquez; Jed Madela; Bituin Escalante; Lyka Estrella | | |
| May 16, 2025 | BRAVO!: Voices of the Filipino | Fox Theatre, Redwood City, California | United States | Sofronio Vasquez; Jed Madela; Bituin Escalante; Lyka Estrella | | |
| May 18, 2025 | BRAVO!: Voices of the Filipino | Historic BAL Theater, San Leandro, California | United States | Sofronio Vasquez; Jed Madela; Bituin Escalante; Lyka Estrella | | |

Notes:

1. ^ ^{a} The concert, planned for April 23, 2019, was moved.

== Award ==
| Year | Award | Category | Recipient | Result | Ref. |
|---|---|---|---|---|---|
| 2018 | Best Choice Awards 2018 | Most Successful Singing Talent Competition in Philippine Television | Tawag ng Tanghalan | Won | |
