= Noven Belleza =

Filipino singer

- Birth name: Noven Gonzaga Belleza
- Born: 26 November 1994 (age 30); Victorias City, Philippines
- Genres: Pop
- Occupation: Singer-songwriter
- Instrument(s): Guitar, vocals
- Years active: 2016–present
- Labels: Star Music (2017–present)

Noven Gonzaga Belleza (born November 26, 1994) is a Filipino singer-songwriter best known for being named as the grand champion of the first season of Tawag ng Tanghalan, on the noon-time television show It's Showtime. He was born and raised in Victorias City.

== Biography ==
Noven Belleza was born on November 26, 1994, in Hacienda Salome, Victorias City, province of Negros Occidental, Philippines. He is the oldest child of Reynaldo and Rosie Belleza, and has seven siblings. Belleza is the son of a farmer, and dreamed of becoming a well-known singer one day. He went to Doña Andrea Palanca Elementary School and Victorias National High School. Singing runs through his father's family. It was his father who taught and trained Belleza to sing better. Belleza was seven years old when he started joining singing competition locally. His father pursued him to join and to be one of the contestants in a singing contest at their city.

Martin Nievera, Basil Valdez, Air Supply, and Journey are his favourite musical artists.

== Career ==
=== Tawag ng Tanghalan ===
Belleza tried to audition at The Voice of the Philippines and Pilipinas Got Talent, but with no luck. He later tried to audition at Tawag ng Tanghalan in Showtime and made it on air.

A month later, he was one of the finalists at the Grand Finals, along with Sam Mangubat and Froilan Canlas. He sang "May Bukas Pa" by Rico J. Puno to book his place to the top three. Then he sang the Air Supply's "The One That You Love", "Now and Forever" and "Without You", which amazed the judges. Then, garnering of 99.96% of final score, Belleza was declared as the winner with a house and lot from Camella, 2 million pesos, a negosyo package, a recording contract with Star Music, a trophy and a GB musical instrument.

=== Present ===
After winning Tawag ng Tanghalan, many projects awaited Belleza. He was a guest at Wish 107.5 wherein he sang his winning songs. His story was featured in Maalaala Mo Kaya, wherein Khalil Ramos played Belleza. He has also been a guest on Magandang Buhay, Gandang Gabi, Vice!, ASAP, Tonight with Boy Abunda, and It's Showtime.

==== Sexual Assault ====
On July 19, 2017, Belleza was said to be involved of sexual assault to a 19-year-old girl. Belleza was arrested on July 16 after appearing on Vice Ganda's concert in Cebu. He asserts that he did not commit the crime and he will prove that he is innocent.

On August 31, 2017, the sexual assault case of the singer has been dropped by the accuser. The case was eventually dismissed on September 11, 2017.

== Filmography ==
=== Television ===
Year	TV program	Notes	Network
2017	Tawag ng Tanghalan	Contestant/Grand Champion	ABS-CBN
2017	It's Showtime	Guest Performer	ABS-CBN
2017	Maalaala mo Kaya: Tubuhan	Himself/Guest	ABS-CBN
2017	The Bottomline with Boy Abunda	Guest	ABS-CBN
2017	Tonight with Boy Abunda	Guest	ABS-CBN
2017	Umagang Kay Ganda	Guest	ABS-CBN
2017	ASAP	Performer	ABS-CBN

Awards and achievements
Preceded by New	Tawag ng Tanghalan; 2016–2017 season 1	Succeeded by Jhon Clyd Talili
