= Dessa (Filipina singer) =

- Also known as: Asia's Powerhouse Diva
- Born: Maria Destreza Alivio Salazar; March 20, 1974 (age 52); Philippines
- Origin: Philippines
- Genres: Pop
- Occupation: Recording artist
- Label: Star Music

Maria Destreza Alivio Salazar (born March 20, 1974), commonly known as Dessa, is a Filipino singer. She is best known for singing OPM hits such as Saan Ka Man Naroroon, "Bring Back the Times", "Lipad ng Pangarap" and many more.

== Early life ==
Born to a family who frequently moved house, Dessa formed no permanent friendships, though she did learn to adjust to new environments. Her sister Dolly, older by two years, and older brother Dodoy were her only playmates; she took up dancing to amuse herself and her parents, then moved on to singing. Dessa's father was employed at Quezon City Hall, and her mother Francisca was a housewife. To support her family, Dessa sometimes sold her mother's icedrop at school. At her mother's encouragement, she began to enter singing contests at the age of 10 to enable them to feed themselves; they sought out competitions together. When Dessa was 14, she was discovered by Mitch Valdes, who told Boy Abunda—who had just entered talent management—about her. In 1990, she joined Abunda's new talent management agency. She then began to dominate major singing contests, and in 1993 she won the top prize in the Voice of Asia. She was also the first winner of the Pasinaya 2005 awards.

== Early career ==
When she entered an international competition in the Central Asian Republic of Kazakhstan of the former Soviet Union, she bested even the most experienced contestants. She also won the 1993 FIDOF award in Russia and the Saga Yoshinogari Festa '98 (an Asian music festival held in Saga, Japan), the Best Interpreter Award in the 1999 Asia Song Festival in Malaysia, and became the main feature of the best-selling concert "Front Act".

When she fronted for Mike Francis' major concert at the Rizal Memorial Stadium, the audience booed her when she came onstage, but when she began to sing, they became silent, and when she was finished they were applauding. During the 1990s the press labeled Dessa the "Front Act Queen", as she had fronted for more foreign acts than any other local artist, including Color Me Badd, Mike Francis, Deniece Williams, David Benoit, Lisa Stansfield, Richard Elliot, Bryan Adams, Peabo Bryson, Patti Austin and CeCe Peniston. After she fronted for Patti Austin, Austin was said to remark "My God! She is so good, I should be the one doing the front act for her!"

== Later career ==
At 21, Dessa became a mother to a baby daughter Noshka. Not many months later, she called her older sister to share her grief and suffering caused by her then-husband. She experienced physical and emotional abuse, and at times he would continue beating her while she ran to the neighbors for help. She eventually left him on advice from her sister and some other friends.

Dessa worked very hard to raise a six-month-old baby on her own and sometimes had more than one show a day. Through her efforts she was able to buy a house and lot in Antipolo in which she lived with her family. She forwent her own education while ensuring that her siblings received better and that her parents had comfortable lives.

In 2004, Dessa traveled to the United States to take a break from her work. In Los Angeles, she met Jay Inoue, a Filipino-American who, with Richard Wilner of the Wilner and O'Reilly law firm, enabled her to work legally in the US as a Person of Extraordinary Talent. In 2006 she received her permanent resident card and married Inoue. Their baby son named Jay Matthew was born on February 25, 2005.

Dessa and Inoue have moved to Las Vegas where (as of February 1, 2008) they have a business called Killing Solutions that provides computers and other machines to local hotels, of which Inoue is the executive producer. Inoue formerly worked with computers, but now he does computer designing. As of April 13, 2007, she is a distributor of scented candles and sometimes demonstrates how to make them.

Dessa has recorded, among others, the songs Saan Ka Man Naroroon, Alone Again Naturally, Point of No Return, Respect, Never Fall in Love Again and Come in Out of the Rain.

Dessa and Rannie Raymundo won the Best Pop Collection in the Aiza Awards for 2001's best releases with the song Noon, Ngayon.

In September 2005, she performed the Philippine National Anthem at a Manny Pacquiao vs. Héctor Velázquez boxing fight at the Staples Center in Los Angeles, California.

== Discography ==
- 2003 : METROPOP SONG FESTIVAL

“Pag Ang Puso Ang Nagsabi” (Duet with Reuben Laurente de The Company)

- 2001 : RESPECT... DESSA

“Heartbreaker” Premium Label / Star Records

- 2000 : MARTIN LIVE ALBUM

“The Prayer" (duet) ABS-CBN / MCA Universal

- 1999 : METROPOP SONG FESTIVAL

“Friends" (duet) “Bring Back The Times”

- 1998 : NONOY ZUÑIGA (del Duet Album)

“Hold On” PolyCosmic Records

- 1994 : GONNA MAKE YOUR DAY TONIGHT

Vicor Records

- 1992 : DESSA ISANG NAGMAMAHAL ALBUM

Vicor Records

== Awards ==
AWIT AWARDS

- 2002 : BEST DUO RECORDING

“Noon, Ngayon” (Duet with Rannie Raymundo) Star Records

KATHA

- 1999 : BEST PERFORMER

“No Less” Composed by Trina Belamide

4th ASIAN SONG FESTIVAL

- 1998 : 2nd Prize Winner

Kuala Lumpur, Malaysia

METROPOP SONG FESTIVAL

- 1998 : 2nd Prize Winner

“"Bring Back the Times" Composed by Eunice Saldana

VOICE OF ASIA

- 1993 : Best Singer

“"Bring Back the Times" FIDOF (Russia)

LIKHAWIT

- 1993 : Grand Prize Winner

“Huwag ng Ipagpabukas Pa” Composed by Freddie Saturno
