= Carmelle Collado =

Filipino singer (born 2007)

Carmelle
- Carmelle in 2026

Background information
- Born: Carmelle Allyza San Juan Collado; July 16, 2007 (age 19); Sipocot, Camarines Sur, Philippines
- Genres: Pop; dance-pop; R&B
- Occupations: Singer; songwriter; actress; television presenter
- Instrument: Vocals
- Years active: 2019–present
- Label: Star Music

Carmelle Allyza San Juan Collado (born July 16, 2007), known mononymously as Carmelle, is a Filipino singer, songwriter, actress and television presenter. She first gained recognition in 2019 as the runner-up of the fourth season of the singing competition The Voice Kids, as a team of Bamboo Mañalac. That same year, she represented the Philippines at the World Championships of Performing Arts (WCOPA), where she won seven gold medals.

In 2025, she won the singing competition Tawag ng Tanghalan: The School Showdown, subsequently joining the reality show Pinoy Big Brother. During this period, she began pursuing a recording career with Star Music, releasing cover singles including "Maalaala Mo Kaya" and "Stay", preceded by her debut single "Unti-Unti" with Kevin Yadao. In 2026, she released her first solo single "Morena", followed by her self-titled debut album and her first solo concert. She won the Eurovision Song Contest Asia 2026 for Philippines with the song "Sobra-Sobra", becoming the contest’s inaugural winner.

== Early life ==
Collado was born in Sipocot, Camarines Sur, as an only child. She grew up in a family of singers, including her grandmother, who also joined singing competitions in the past. According to her mother, who also serves as her vocal coach, Carmelle's talent for singing was already evident at the age of three. She continued to participate in competitions while pursuing her studies. In May 2025, she graduated from senior high school at the King Thomas Learning Academy in Camarines Sur, finishing with honors. She is also known for being a student leader, dancer, majorette and a church psalmist. Currently, she is pursuing a Tourism degree at the University of Nueva Caceres.

== Career ==
In 2019, Collado won a total of seven gold medals at the World Championships of Performing Arts (WCOPA) in Long Beach, California, United States, where she represented the Philippines. The WCOPA is considered a prestigious international competition for performers and entertainers from various countries. In the same year, she competed in the fourth season of The Voice Kids in the Philippines as a member of Bamboo Mañalac's team, finishing as the runner-up.

In 2024, she represented King Thomas Learning Academy in Tawag ng Tanghalan: School Showdown and won the title in January 2025. She got a total average score of 98% from the jury. In the final round, she performed a medley of Aretha Franklin hits "(You Make Me Feel Like) A Natural Woman", "Chain of Fools", and "Ain't No Way", which earned a standing ovation from the judges.

She also collaborated with The Voice season 26 winner Sofronio Vasquez on a new rendition of the OPM song "Maalaala Mo Kaya", which serves as the theme song for the ABS-CBN television series Maalaala Mo Kaya. In October 2025, she joined Pinoy Big Brother: Celebrity Collab Edition 2.0.

=== 2026–present: Carmelle, and Eurovision Song Contest Asia ===
Carmelle performing "Sobra-Sobra" at the Eurovision Song Contest Asia 2026 in Bangkok, Thailand

In May 2026, she released Morena, her first original solo single. The pop-dance song was composed and produced by Jonathan Manalo, with contributions from Jeremy G and members of WRIVE. Later that month, she released her self-titled debut album, Carmelle, containing 11 tracks, including Morena, Salamin, Checklist, Pananabik, Kinang, No Apologies, Who, Pangarap Ko'y Tagumpay, Stay, Unti-Unti, and Morena – Remix.

In August 2026, she was announced as one of the participants in the Philippine Selection Night, the Philippines' national selection for the Eurovision Song Contest Asia 2026, with the song "Sobra-Sobra", composed by Nica del Rosario and Mat Olavides. She went on to become the inaugural winner of the competition, getting the highest score from both the national juries and the public vote.

== Discography ==
=== Studio albums ===
List of studio albums, with selected details
Title	Album details
Carmelle	Released: May 15, 2026; Label: Star Music; Formats: digital download, streaming

=== Singles ===
List of singles as lead artist, showing year released, and associated albums
Title	Year	Album
"Unti-Unti"	2025	Carmelle
"Stay"	2026	Carmelle
"Morena"	2026	Carmelle
"Sobra-Sobra"	2026	Pili, Pinas!: Philippine Selection Night 2026 EP

== Filmography ==
=== Television ===
Year	Title	Role	Notes	Ref.
2019	World Championships of Performing Arts	Herself	Contestant; 7 gold medals	
2019	The Voice Kids Philippines	Herself	Contestant (season 4); 1st Runner-up	
2025	Tawag ng Tanghalan: School Showdown	Herself	Contestant; Grand Champion	
2025–present	ASAP	Herself	Performer	
2025–2026	Pinoy Big Brother: Celebrity Collab Edition 2.0	Herself	Housemate (season 4)	
2026	Philippine Selection Night	Herself	Contestant; Winner	
2026	Eurovision Song Contest Asia 2026	Herself	Filipino entrant; Winner	

Awards and achievements
Preceded by None	Philippines in the Eurovision Song Contest Asia; 2026	Succeeded by TBD
Preceded by None	Winner of the Eurovision Song Contest Asia; 2026	Succeeded by TBD
