= Idol series in the Philippines =

The Philippines had three adaptations of the singing competition Pop Idol under three different titles and on three different networks:

- Philippine Idol, which aired in 2006 on ABC (now TV5)
- Pinoy Idol, which aired in 2008 on GMA
- Idol Philippines, produced by ABS-CBN Studios
  - 2019 Idol Philippines (season 1)
  - 2022 Idol Philippines (season 2)
  - 2025 Idol Kids Philippines

== See also ==
- 1DOL, a 2010 Filipino TV drama on ABS-CBN
