= Khimo Gumatay =

Filipino singer-songwriter

- Born: September 24, 1999 (age 26); Makati, Philippines
- Education: University of Makati (AB)
- Occupations: Singer; songwriter
- Years active: 2019–present
- Known for: Tawag ng Tanghalan season 3; Your Moment; Idol Philippines season 2 (winner)
- Musical career
- Genres: Soul; acoustic; R&B
- Instruments: Vocals; guitar
- Labels: Old School Records; (2021): Star Music; (2022–present)

Khimo Gumatay (born September 24, 1999), known mononymously as Khimo, is a Filipino singer and songwriter. He is the winner of the second season of Idol Philippines.

== Early life ==
Gumatay, the second of three kids, was born and raised to a clan of performers; his father was a member of the famous "The Singing Cooks and Waiters" and a sister who also sings but settled into the military. On his teenage years, Gumatay was advised by his family to enter the police or the military service, but his love and passion for singing prevailed which resulted to music trainings, joining competitions, and singing commercial jingles. In College, he became a member of the UMak Chorale that helped him to get the scholarship, eventually finished his studies. In a media conference, Gumatay shared that during the pandemic he became a live streamer to generate funds that leads him to be a part of an international singing competition held on Instagram organized by Boyz II Men member Wanya Morris.

== Career ==
=== 2019–2021: Career beginnings ===
In 2019, Gumatay contended in the fourth quarter of the third season of Tawag ng Tanghalan with his version of Jason Derulo's hit "Marry Me". That same year, he also participated on Your Moment as part of the duo called "Binary". In 2021, Gumatay released his debut single "Where the Sun Goes" featuring singer-songwriter and composer Dotty.

Tawag ng Tanghalan sa Showtime Season 3 performances and results
Week	Theme	Song	Original Artist	Date	Result	Ref.
Quarter 4 Week 4	—N/a	"Marry Me" (vs. Juluis Cawaling)	Jason Derulo	April 30, 2019	Eliminated	

Your Moment - Singing Category (as part of the duo, Binary) performances and results
Week	Theme	Song	Original Artist	Date	Result		Ref.
Your First Moment	—N/a	"Kathang Isip" (vs. Inside City and Soul Divas)	Ben&Ben	November 16, 2019	80.00%	Proceed to level 2	
Your Moment of Choice	—N/a	—N/a (vs. Verse Band and Maka Girls)	—N/a	December 28 & 29, 2019	82.78%	Eliminated	

=== 2022: Idol Philippines Season 2 ===
In July 2022, his audition piece "Isn't She Lovely" by Stevie Wonder garnered praises from the judges; with Regine Velasquez saying "the hopeful knows how to play his cards well, how to hit the high notes and charm his audience". In August 2022, his performance of Brian McKnight's "One Last Cry" received an approval from Boyz II Men member Wanya Morris. On September 18, he was announced as the grand winner of Idol Philippines after garnering 89 percent of combined judges scores and public votes with his journey song "Bagong Simula" and winning piece "My Time", earning a ₱1 million cash prize, a franchise from Dermacare worth ₱3 million, a house and lot worth ₱2.5 million from Camella Homes, and a contract with Star Music.

Idol Philippines Season 2 performances and results
Week	Theme	Song	Original Artist	Date	Result		Ref.
Audition	—N/a	"Isn't She Lovely"	Stevie Wonder	July 16, 2022	Got 4 Yes from the Judges	Advanced to Idol City	
Group Round	—N/a	"Kapag Ako ay Nagmahal" (vs. Bryan Chong, Eian Bryle, JB Pallarca and Paul Macalindong)	Jolina Magdangal	August 6, 2022	Saved by the judges with Bryan Chong and Paul Macalindong	Advanced to Next Round	
Do or Die Round	—N/a	"I Want To Know What Love Is" (vs. Bino Serito, Dior Bronia, Justin Ortega, Christian Tibayan, and Thias)	Foreigner	August 7, 2022	Saved by the judges	Advanced to Top 20	
Solo Round	Solo Song	"Tala"	Sarah Geronimo	August 13, 2022	Saved by the judges	Advanced to Top 12	
Live Round Week 1: Top 12	Hugot Songs	"One Last Cry"	Brian McKnight	August 20 & 21, 2022	74.78%	Safe	
Live Round Week 2: Top 10	Songs of Ogie Alcasid	"Kailangan Kita"	Ogie Alcasid	August 27 & 28, 2022	82.10%	Safe	
Live Round Week 3: Top 8	Teleserye and Movie Theme Songs	"Hataw Na"	Gary Valenciano	September 3 & 4, 2022	83.48%	Bottom four	
Live Round Week 3: Top 8	Teleserye and Movie Theme Songs	"Summer Nights"/"You're the One That I Want" alongside the Idol Top 8 (Ann Raniel, Bryan Chong, Delly Cuales, Kice, PJ Fabia, Ryssi Avila, and Trisha Gomez)	John Travolta and Olivia Newton-John	September 3 & 4, 2022	Non-competition performance	Bottom four	
Live Round Week 4: Top 6	Showstoppers	"End of the Road"	Boyz II Men	September 10 & 11, 2022	96.13%	Safe	
Live Round Week 4: Top 6	Showstoppers	"Di Bale Na Lang" (alongside Gary Valenciano, Bryan Chong, and PJ Fabia)	Gary Valenciano	September 10 & 11, 2022	Non-competition performance	Safe	
Final Week	The Final Showdown - Top 5	"You're Still the One"	Shania Twain	September 17, 2022	92.63%	Safe	
Final Week	The Grand Finale	"Bagong Simula"	Jem Macatuno	September 18, 2022	89.00%	Winner	
Final Week	The Grand Finale	"My Time"	Himself	September 18, 2022	89.00%	Winner	

=== 2022–present: Post-Idol Philippines Season 2 ===
The day after winning the Idol Philippines, Gumatay appeared on the morning show TeleRadyo. On September 23, Gumatay performed "My Time" on It's Showtime. On September 25, Khimo together with Ryssi Avila, Kice, Ann Raniel, and Bryan Chong officially launched as a new addition on the Philippines' Sunday variety show ASAP Natin 'To, where he performed "My Time". On September 28, Khimo made an appearance on the morning show Frontline sa Umaga.

In August 2026, he is announced to be one of the participants for the Philippine Selection Night, the Philippine national selection for the Eurovision Song Contest Asia 2026, with the song "Reason to Live", composed by Stephen Tan.

== Discography ==
=== Singles ===
Year	Song Title	Album	Composer(s)	Label(s)	Ref.
2021	"Where the Sun Goes" (featuring Dotty)	Where The Sun Goes - Single	Nhiko Viktor, Dotty	Old School Records on behalf of Star Music	
2022	"My Time"	Idol Philippines Season 2	Jeremy Glinoga	Star Music	
2022	"Sino Ka Ba"	The Iron Heart	Rox Santos, Jeremy Glinoga, Jonathan Manalo	Star Music	

=== Collaborations ===
Year	Song Title	Album	Composer(s)	Label(s)	Ref.
2022	"Tayo ang Ligaya ng Isa't Isa" (Note: "The track was released as a theme song of ABS CBN's Christmas ID 2022 with Kapamilya artists Sharon Cuneta, Piolo Pascual, Ogie Alcasid, Regine Velasquez, Kathryn Bernardo, Daniel Padilla, Gary Valenciano, Martin Nievera, Zsa Zsa Padilla, Sarah Geronimo, Jolina Magdangal, Melai Cantiveros, Jed Madela, Chito Miranda, Moira Dela Torre, Angeline Quinto, Klarisse De Guzman, Erik Santos, KZ Tandingan, Anne Curtis, Kim Chiu, Joshua Garcia, Janella Salvador, Jane De Leon, Darren Espanto, AC Bonifacio, Donny Pangilinan, Belle Mariano, Francine Diaz, Kyle Echarri, Seth Fedelin, Andrea Brillantes, KD Estrada and Alexa Ilacad.")	Tayo ang Ligaya ng Isa't Isa - Single	Robert Labayen	Star Music	

== Concerts and tours ==
=== Joint tours and concerts ===
Year	Date	Title	City	Country	Venue	Ref.
2020	December 17 & 24	Reach Out: Revive the High Five Virtual Concert 2020 (Note: "Together with Mayonnaise, Janine Teñoso, UMak Jammers, UMak Dance Xtreme, Eygee De Vera, Kyle Philippe Mallari, Juniel Morillo, JAMArineros, Synco, KIJ, Keryx Krisha, Stacey Balut, and Roda Dizon; with special appearance of Ian Pangilinan, Arkin Del Rosario, Miguel Echano, Mr. and Ms. UMak 2020, and Ms. Makati 2019 Beatrice Santos.")	Makati City	Philippines	virtual via Facebook Live	

=== Performances on award shows and specials ===
Year	Date	Title	Performed song(s)	Country	Ref.
2022	September 27	2nd Diamond Excellence Awards	"My Time"	Philippines	
2022	October 28	Christmas Like No Other	—N/a	Philippines	
2022	November 23	35th Awit Awards	Nonoy Zuñiga Medley (Note: "Alongside Idol Philippines Season 2 alumni Ryssi Avila, PJ Fabia, Ann Raniel, and Bryan Chong")	Philippines	

== Filmography ==
=== Television ===
Year	Title	Role	Notes	Ref.
2022 – present	ASAP Natin 'To	Himself	Aired every Sunday.	

== See also ==
- List of Idols winners
- 2022 in Philippine music

== Notes ==
Preceded by Zephanie Dimaranan	Idol Philippines; Winner; Season 2 (June 2022–September 2022)	Succeeded by Incumbent
