= Idol Philippines season 1 =

Inaugural season (2019) of the Philippine reality show singing competition

Idol Philippines
- Season 1
- Hosted by: Billy Crawford
- Judges: Regine Velasquez; Vice Ganda; Moira Dela Torre; James Reid
- Winner: Zephanie Dimaranan
- Runner-up: Lucas Garcia
- Finals venue: Newport Performing Arts Theater
- Companion show: Idol on the Road (Digital)
- No. of episodes: 29

Release
- Original network: ABS-CBN
- Original release: April 21 – July 28, 2019

Season chronology
- Next → Season 2

The first season of Idol Philippines aired on ABS-CBN (under the full title Search for the Idol Philippines) from April 21 to July 28, 2019, replacing World of Dance Philippines and was replaced by the fourth season of The Voice Kids. It was the first season to air on the network following two defunct iterations from different networks. Billy Crawford hosted the season; while the judging panel was composed of singer-actress Regine Velasquez, comedian and television presenter Vice Ganda, singer-actor James Reid, and singer-songwriter Moira Dela Torre.

Zephanie Dimaranan of Biñan, Laguna was named Idol Philippines, winning an exclusive recording contract from Star Music and ₱2,000,000. Lucas Garcia of Lipa, Batangas finished as the runner-up with Lance Busa finishing in third place.

== Overview ==
=== Development ===
On October 17, 2018, it was announced that ABS-CBN will broadcast the third incarnation of the Idol franchise in the Philippines after it had sealed a franchise deal with Fremantle and 19 Entertainment, the co-owners of the format.

=== Prizes ===
The winner of the season received ₱2,000,000, a paid vacation trip to Taiwan, a House & Lot from Camella Homes and an exclusive recording contract from Star Music

== Judges and host ==
Judges and host of the first season of Idol Philippines

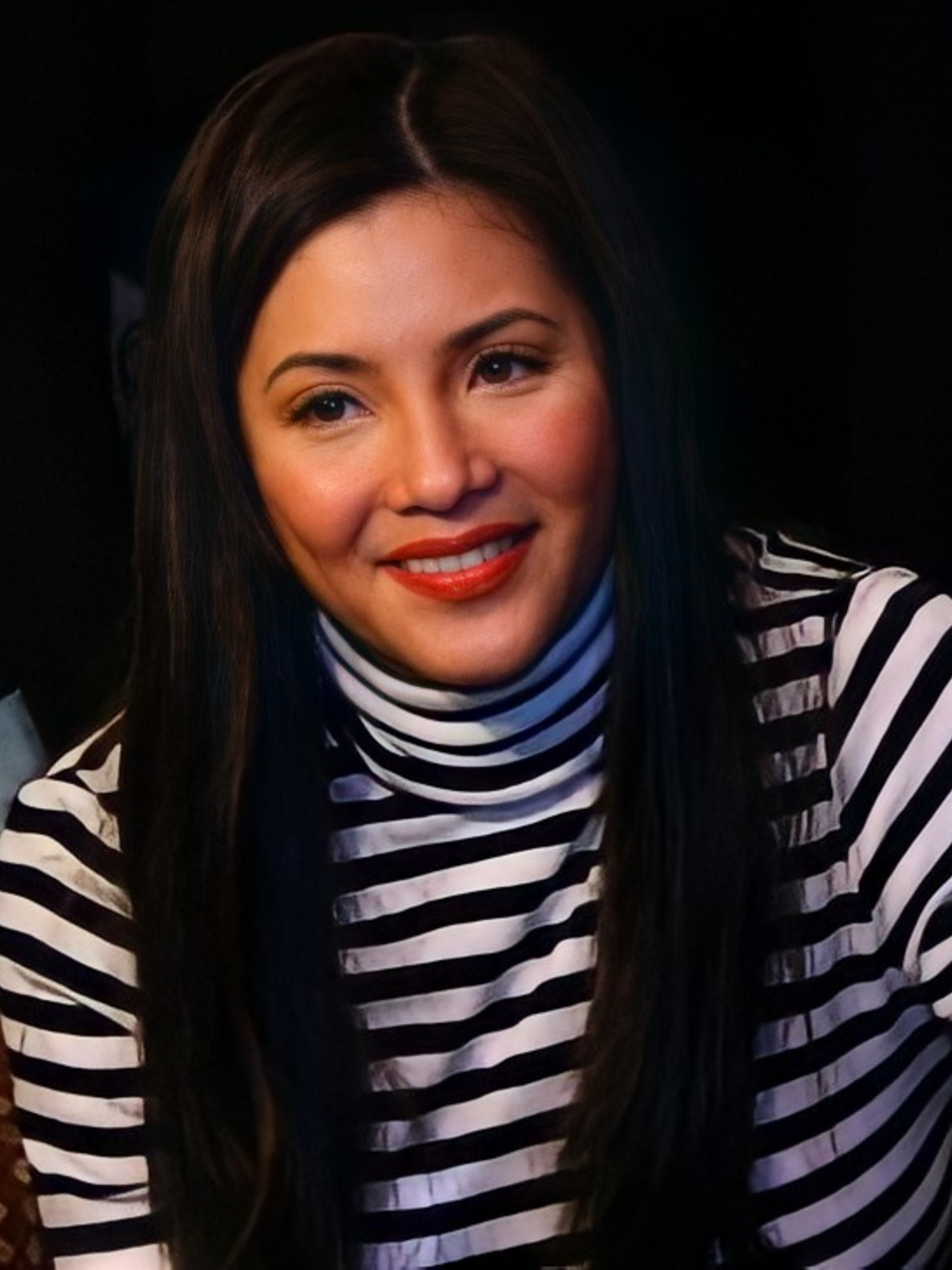
Regine Velasquez

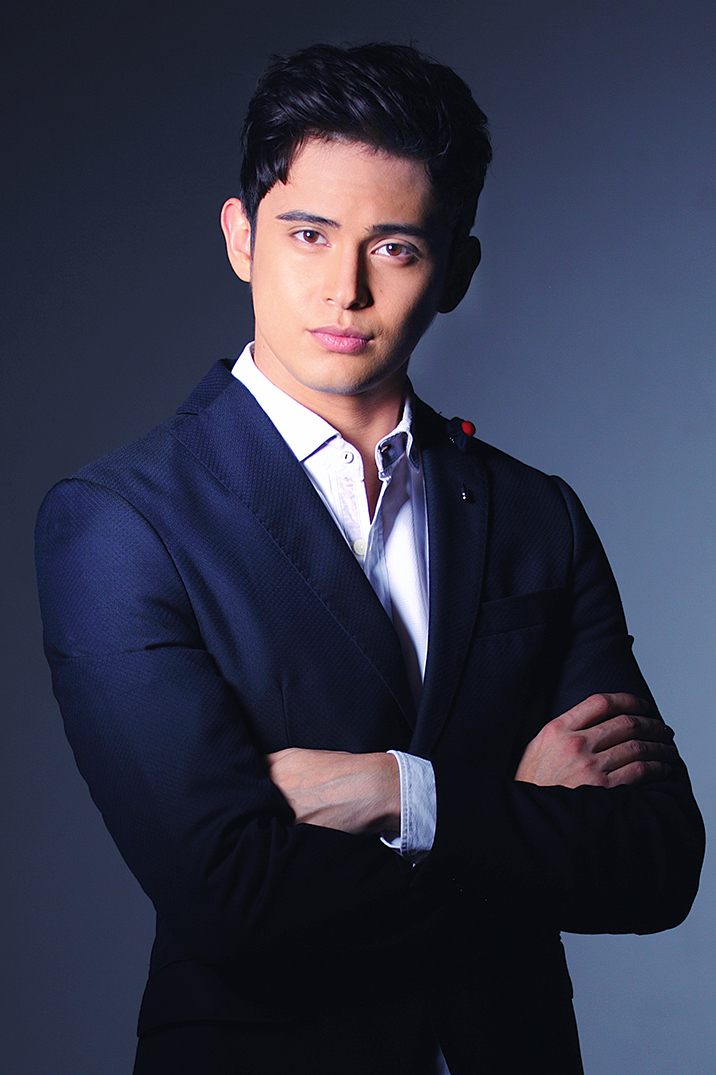
James Reid

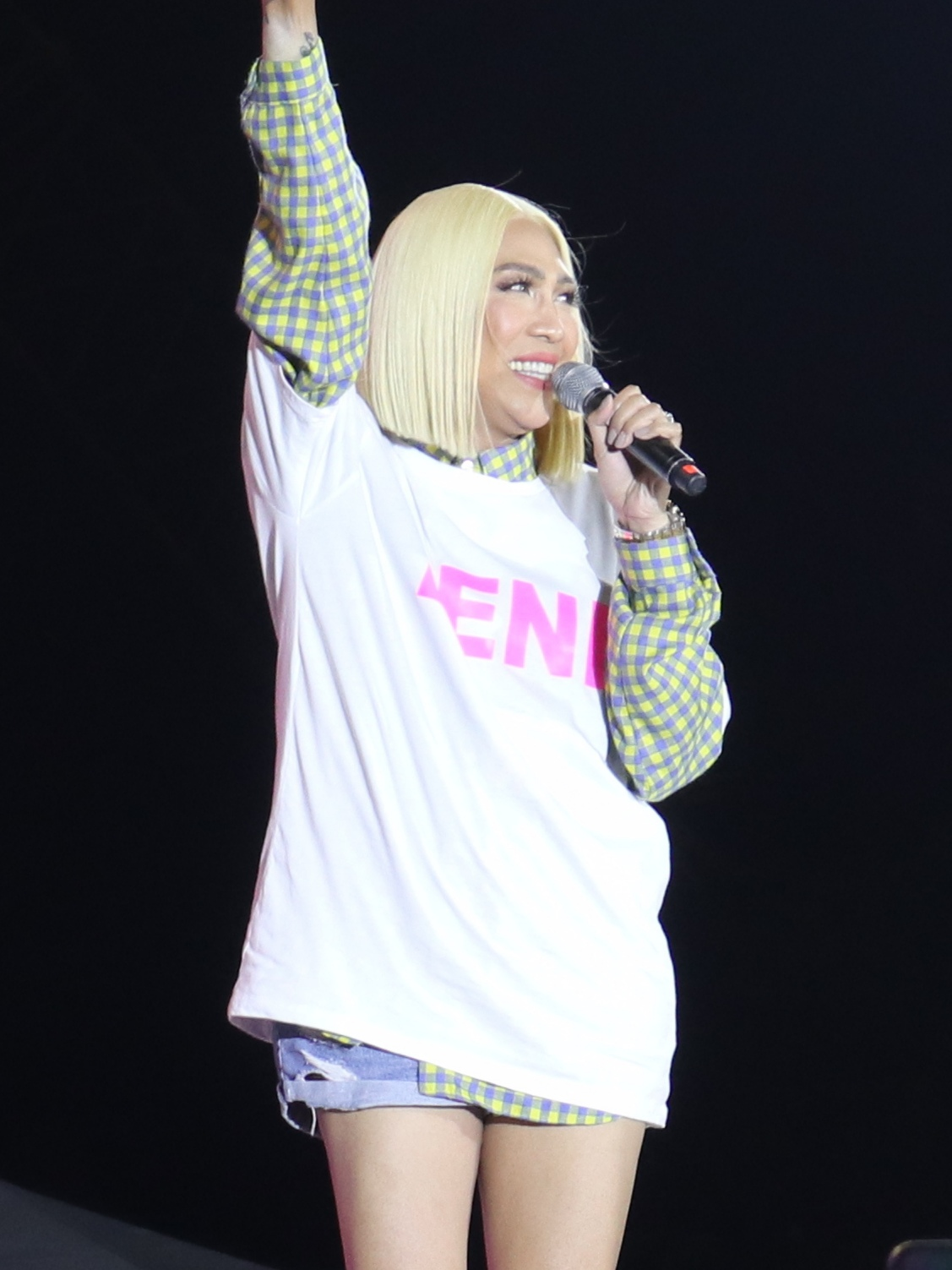
Vice Ganda

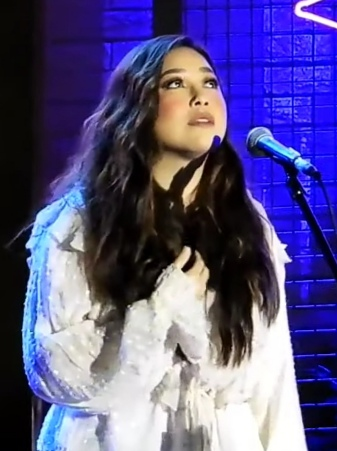
Moira Dela Torre

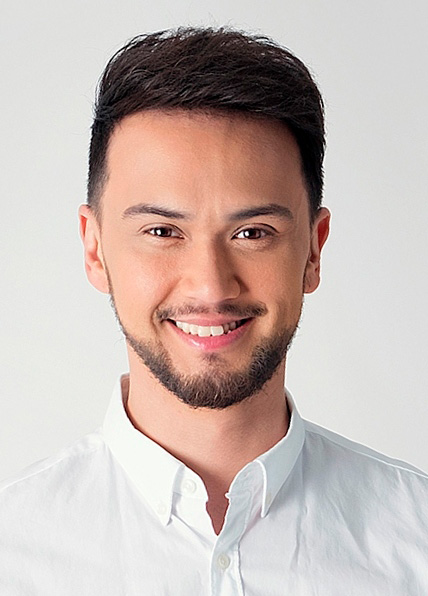
Billy Crawford

In October 2018, Regine Velasquez was revealed as the first judge after signing her exclusive contract with ABS-CBN. With her 32 years in the entertainment industry, this will be a first time for her to judge a singing competition. Following this announcement, there were rumors that Jessica Sanchez, the runner-up of the 11th season of American Idol, will be added as a judge but it has been denied by her. Speculations also circulated that David Archuleta, the runner-up of the seventh season of American Idol, was also considered to become a judge for the show, but the rumors were downplayed by him saying that he was not invited by the network's management.

In November 2018, Billy Crawford confirmed his role as the host of the local franchise which is part of his renewed contract deal with ABS-CBN.

On February 26, 2019, Philippine Entertainment Portal unofficially revealed that James Reid, Vice Ganda and Moira Dela Torre will join Velasquez as the show's judging panel. According to the website, a reliable source sent them a photo of the four judges standing behind a judges' table similar to those of the other Idol franchises. The three remaining judges' were later confirmed on the same day, after they were officially introduced on TV Patrol, ABS-CBN's primetime newscast. Among the four judges, Vice Ganda is an experienced judge—having been a judge for It's Showtime besides being a host, Pinoy Boyband Superstar, and two seasons of Pilipinas Got Talent. It was revealed in an interview that Vice Ganda was the only judge handpicked by Fremantle.

=== Companion online show ===
An online show, called Idol on the Road, airs together with the main program on Idol Philippines' Facebook and YouTube accounts; it is hosted by BoybandPH and comedian Jervi Li, commonly known as KaladKaren Davila. The said show airs live from the Idol Philippines Bus.

=== Pre-auditions ===
The pre-auditions for the premiere season took place in different key cities in the Philippines. Auditionees must be 16 to 28 years old.

Shortlist of the locations for the Idol Philippines' pre-auditions
Date	Venue	City	Ref.
November 15, 2018	Center for Multiple Intelligence School	Lapu-Lapu City	
November 15, 2018	Karesh Commercial Complex	Bogo, Cebu	
November 15, 2018	Rock Republic	Cebu City	
November 15, 2018	Tulay Bar	Maasin, Southern Leyte	
November 16, 2018	Brown Academy School	Cebu City	
November 16, 2018	Monterey School, Inc.	Talisay, Cebu	
November 16, 2018	Pier Capitan Superdome	Ormoc, Leyte	
November 17, 2018	Barili Gymnasium	Cebu City	
November 17, 2018	Manros Plaza Building	Cebu City	
November 17, 2018	Municipality of San Jose Function Room	San Jose, Antique	
November 17 & 18, 2018	Palo Leyte Academic Center	Palo, Leyte	
November 23, 2018	Bukidnon National High School	Malaybalay, Bukidnon	
November 24, 2018	Sanguniang Panlungsod Building	Gingoog	
November 24 & 25, 2018	Lipa City Youth and Cultural Center	Lipa, Batangas	
November 25, 2018	University of the Philippines–Baguio	Baguio	
November 30, 2018	Lyceum of the Philippines University Manila	Intramuros, Manila	
December 1, 2018	Surigao State College of Technology–Del Carmen	Del Carmen, Surigao del Norte	
December 1 & 2, 2018	University of Negros Occidental–Recoletos	Bacolod City	
December 2, 2018	Lyceum of the Philippines University Manila	Intramuros, Manila	
December 3, 2018	CFC School of Morning Star	Butuan	
January 19 & 20, 2019	Pacific Mall	Mandaue City	
January 19 & 20, 2019	People's Gym	Digos, Davao del Sur	
January 26 & 27, 2019	Starmall Alabang	Alabang, Muntinlupa	

Aside from ground scouting and pre-auditions held all over the Philippines, the online auditions was also launched in November 20, 2018.

== Competition summary ==
Color key

Winner
Runner-up
2nd Runner-up
Eliminated in the Live Shows
Eliminated in the Theater Rounds – Solo Round
Eliminated in the Theater Rounds – Do-or-Die Round
Eliminated in the Theater Rounds – Group Round

Top 69 contestants
Zephanie Dimaranan	Lucas Garcia	Lance Busa	Dan Ombao	Miguel Odron
Elle Ocampo	Sheland Faelnar	Fatima Louise	Renwick Benito	Trish Bonilla
Rachel Libres	Matty Juniosa	Charmagne Algario	Denize Castillo	Enzo Almario
Jasper Lacson	Jeremiah Torayno	Kevin Hermogenes	Michelle Primavera	Roque Belino
Alyssa Quijano	Ameurfina Martinez III	Angie Kristine Gorbulev	Carlo Bautista	Diane Vergoza
Erika Tenorio	Gello Marquez	Ibrahim Onggo	Isaiah Tiglao	Jehramae Trangia
Julia Joaquin	Kier King	Krissha Viaje	Mia Villaflores	Rainier Natividad
Ramil Permigones	Trix Corpez	Vanya Castor	Yarah Estrella	Abby Manguinao
Ali Aguila	Ana May delos Reyes	Angelo Pineda	Bella Fall	Brandon Diamante
Calvin Encomienda	Carmella Ravanilla	Clyde Aquino	Cyra Jureidini	Dea Formilleza
Endy Asidor	Eunice Torion	Geca Morales	Jap-Jap Talania	Jhamil Villanueva
Juancho Gabriel	Julian Lee Vasquez	Kathleen Galula	Kyran Oliver	Leann Ganzon
Lucho Beech	Luvlou Ulanday	Margarette Jimenez	Micoline Acedera	Nic Galano
Nicoll del Finado	Sean Oliver	Shai Gomez	Zeke Villanueva	

== Auditions ==
The auditions were recorded at the One Canvas Events Place in Makati. In the televised auditions, contestants will perform in front of the panel of judges. Each contestant must receive three "yes" votes from the judges in order to advance and receive a golden ticket to Idol City. The first audition episode was aired on April 21, 2019, with the final audition episode being aired on June 8, 2019. 69 Idol hopefuls were able to advance and receive their respective golden ticket to Idol City.

Summary of the auditions for Idol Philippines season 1
Episode(s)	Air Date	Golden tickets
1	April 21, 2019	3
2	April 27, 2019	3
3	April 28, 2019	4
4	May 4, 2019	4
5	May 5, 2019	4
6	May 11, 2019	5
7	May 12, 2019	4
8	May 18, 2019	4
9	May 19, 2019	5
10	May 25, 2019	6
11	May 26, 2019	7
12	June 1, 2019	6
13	June 2, 2019	8
14	June 8, 2019	6
Total no. of contestants		69

== Theater rounds ==
The theater rounds were recorded at the ABS-CBN Soundstage at San Jose del Monte, Bulacan and first aired on June 9, 2019. These are composed of three rounds – the Group, Do or Die, and Solo rounds.

=== Group round ===
In the Group round, the Idol hopefuls were grouped based on their genre and sound. As a group, they selected a song from a list that they think is the best for them, additionally they gave a name to their group. At the end of the group rounds, thirty-nine Idol hopefuls remained.

Color key:

Contestant was chosen by the judges to advance to the Do or Die round
Contestant was eliminated

Episode	Order	Group	Song	Contestant	Hometown	Result
Episode 15 (June 9, 2019)	1	4th Dimension	"Stay with Me" – Sam Smith	Ali Aguila	Quezon City	Eliminated
Episode 15 (June 9, 2019)	1	4th Dimension	"Stay with Me" – Sam Smith	Jap-Jap Talania	Nueva Ecija	Eliminated
Episode 15 (June 9, 2019)	1	4th Dimension	"Stay with Me" – Sam Smith	Kevin Hermogenes	Taguig City	Advanced
Episode 15 (June 9, 2019)	1	4th Dimension	"Stay with Me" – Sam Smith	Lucas Garcia	Lipa, Batangas	Advanced
Episode 15 (June 9, 2019)	2	3GH	"Try" – Pink	Ameurfina Martinez III	Lucena	Advanced
Episode 15 (June 9, 2019)	2	3GH	"Try" – Pink	Charmagne Algario	Bulacan	Advanced
Episode 15 (June 9, 2019)	2	3GH	"Try" – Pink	Elle Ocampo	Pampanga	Advanced
Episode 15 (June 9, 2019)	2	3GH	"Try" – Pink	Krissha Viaje	Quezon City	Advanced
Episode 15 (June 9, 2019)	3	Soul Effection	"Tila" – Lani Misalucha	Carmella Ravanilla	Taytay, Rizal	Eliminated
Episode 15 (June 9, 2019)	3	Soul Effection	"Tila" – Lani Misalucha	Diane Vergoza	Parañaque City	Advanced
Episode 15 (June 9, 2019)	3	Soul Effection	"Tila" – Lani Misalucha	Endy Asidor	Davao	Eliminated
Episode 15 (June 9, 2019)	3	Soul Effection	"Tila" – Lani Misalucha	Rachel Libres	Pasay	Advanced
Episode 15 (June 9, 2019)	4	Voltes 4	"Always Be My Baby" – David Cook	Dan Ombao	Bataan	Advanced
Episode 15 (June 9, 2019)	4	Voltes 4	"Always Be My Baby" – David Cook	Jhamil Villanueva	Taguig City	Eliminated
Episode 15 (June 9, 2019)	4	Voltes 4	"Always Be My Baby" – David Cook	Miguel Odron	Indiana, USA	Advanced
Episode 15 (June 9, 2019)	4	Voltes 4	"Always Be My Baby" – David Cook	Sean Oliver	Iloilo	Eliminated
Episode 15 (June 9, 2019)	5	WHAMAS	"2002" – Anne-Marie	Abby Manguinao	Tagaytay City, Cavite	Eliminated
Episode 15 (June 9, 2019)	5	WHAMAS	"2002" – Anne-Marie	Denize Castillo	Cavite	Advanced
Episode 15 (June 9, 2019)	5	WHAMAS	"2002" – Anne-Marie	Eunice Torion	Cebu	Eliminated
Episode 15 (June 9, 2019)	5	WHAMAS	"2002" – Anne-Marie	Margarette Jimenez	Lingayen, Pangasinan	Eliminated
Episode 15 (June 9, 2019)	5	WHAMAS	"2002" – Anne-Marie	Vanya Castor	Mandaluyong	Advanced
Episode 15 (June 9, 2019)	6	The Current	"Best Part" – Daniel Caesar feat. H.E.R.	Angie Kristine	Siargao	Advanced
Episode 15 (June 9, 2019)	6	The Current	"Best Part" – Daniel Caesar feat. H.E.R.	Bella Fall	Quezon City	Eliminated
Episode 15 (June 9, 2019)	6	The Current	"Best Part" – Daniel Caesar feat. H.E.R.	Erika Tenorio	Nueva Ecija	Advanced
Episode 15 (June 9, 2019)	6	The Current	"Best Part" – Daniel Caesar feat. H.E.R.	Leann Ganzon	Iloilo	Eliminated
Episode 15 (June 9, 2019)	6	The Current	"Best Part" – Daniel Caesar feat. H.E.R.	Mia Villaflores	Pasay	Advanced
Episode 15 (June 9, 2019)	7	Beyonce3Men	"I'll Make Love To You" – Boyz II Men	Gello Marquez	Makati City	Advanced
Episode 15 (June 9, 2019)	7	Beyonce3Men	"I'll Make Love To You" – Boyz II Men	Lance Busa	Agusan Del Norte	Advanced
Episode 15 (June 9, 2019)	7	Beyonce3Men	"I'll Make Love To You" – Boyz II Men	Lucho Beech	USA	Eliminated
Episode 15 (June 9, 2019)	7	Beyonce3Men	"I'll Make Love To You" – Boyz II Men	Matty Juniosa	Mandaluyong	Advanced
Episode 16 (June 15, 2019)	1	Girls on Fire	"Fighter" – Christina Aguilera	Alyssa Quijano	Manila	Advanced
Episode 16 (June 15, 2019)	1	Girls on Fire	"Fighter" – Christina Aguilera	Cyra Jureidini	Cavite	Eliminated
Episode 16 (June 15, 2019)	1	Girls on Fire	"Fighter" – Christina Aguilera	Kathleen Galula	Los Baños, Laguna	Eliminated
Episode 16 (June 15, 2019)	1	Girls on Fire	"Fighter" – Christina Aguilera	Michelle Primavera	Caloocan	Advanced
Episode 16 (June 15, 2019)	2	Collidal District	"Iris" – Goo Goo Dolls	Carlo Bautista	Mandaluyong	Advanced
Episode 16 (June 15, 2019)	2	Collidal District	"Iris" – Goo Goo Dolls	Renwick Benito	Angeles City, Pampanga	Advanced
Episode 16 (June 15, 2019)	2	Collidal District	"Iris" – Goo Goo Dolls	Roque Belino	Baguio	Advanced
Episode 16 (June 15, 2019)	2	Collidal District	"Iris" – Goo Goo Dolls	Trix Corpez	Olongapo City	Advanced
Episode 16 (June 15, 2019)	3	Rated PG	"Born This Way" – Lady Gaga	Ana May Delos Reyes	Lapu-Lapu City	Eliminated
Episode 16 (June 15, 2019)	3	Rated PG	"Born This Way" – Lady Gaga	Dea Formilleza	Compostela Valley	Eliminated
Episode 16 (June 15, 2019)	3	Rated PG	"Born This Way" – Lady Gaga	Luvlou Ulanday	Parañaque City	Eliminated
Episode 16 (June 15, 2019)	3	Rated PG	"Born This Way" – Lady Gaga	Yarah Estrella	Parañaque	Advanced
Episode 16 (June 15, 2019)	3	Rated PG	"Born This Way" – Lady Gaga	Zephanie Dimaranan	Biñan, Laguna	Advanced
Episode 16 (June 15, 2019)	4	A-Boys	"214" – Rivermaya	Angelo Pineda	Digos	Eliminated
Episode 16 (June 15, 2019)	4	A-Boys	"214" – Rivermaya	Calvin Encomienda	Dasmariñas City	Eliminated
Episode 16 (June 15, 2019)	4	A-Boys	"214" – Rivermaya	Clyde Aquino	Cagayan de Oro City	Eliminated
Episode 16 (June 15, 2019)	4	A-Boys	"214" – Rivermaya	Jasper Lacson	Sorsogon City	Advanced
Episode 16 (June 15, 2019)	4	A-Boys	"214" – Rivermaya	Kyran Oliver	Parma, Italy	Eliminated
Episode 16 (June 15, 2019)	5	Beautifour Voices	"It's All Coming Back to Me Now" – Celine Dion	Julia Joaquin	Bohol	Advanced
Episode 16 (June 15, 2019)	5	Beautifour Voices	"It's All Coming Back to Me Now" – Celine Dion	Micoline Acedera	Antipolo City	Eliminated
Episode 16 (June 15, 2019)	5	Beautifour Voices	"It's All Coming Back to Me Now" – Celine Dion	Nicoll del Finado	Binalonan, Pangasinan	Eliminated
Episode 16 (June 15, 2019)	5	Beautifour Voices	"It's All Coming Back to Me Now" – Celine Dion	Trish Bonilla	Lucena City	Advanced
Episode 16 (June 15, 2019)	6	Popsicles	"Mahal Na Mahal" – Sam Concepcion	Brandon Diamante	Bacolod City	Eliminated
Episode 16 (June 15, 2019)	6	Popsicles	"Mahal Na Mahal" – Sam Concepcion	Isaiah Tiglao	—N/a	Advanced
Episode 16 (June 15, 2019)	6	Popsicles	"Mahal Na Mahal" – Sam Concepcion	Rainier Natividad	Sta. Maria, Bulacan	Advanced
Episode 16 (June 15, 2019)	6	Popsicles	"Mahal Na Mahal" – Sam Concepcion	Zeke Villanueva	Bohol	Eliminated
Episode 16 (June 15, 2019)	7	Blush	"Shout Out To My Ex" – Little Mix	Fatima Louise Lagueras	Quezon City	Advanced
Episode 16 (June 15, 2019)	7	Blush	"Shout Out To My Ex" – Little Mix	Geca Morales	Sampaloc City, Manila	Eliminated
Episode 16 (June 15, 2019)	7	Blush	"Shout Out To My Ex" – Little Mix	Jehramae Trangia	Talisay City, Cebu	Advanced
Episode 16 (June 15, 2019)	7	Blush	"Shout Out To My Ex" – Little Mix	Shai Gomez	Canada	Eliminated
Episode 16 (June 15, 2019)	7	Blush	"Shout Out To My Ex" – Little Mix	Sheland Faelnar	Caloocan	Advanced
Episode 16 (June 15, 2019)	8	Power Pop Boys	"Stitches" – Shawn Mendes	Enzo Almario	Sta. Maria, Bulacan	Advanced
Episode 16 (June 15, 2019)	8	Power Pop Boys	"Stitches" – Shawn Mendes	Juancho Gabriel	Olongapo City	Eliminated
Episode 16 (June 15, 2019)	8	Power Pop Boys	"Stitches" – Shawn Mendes	Julian Lee Vasquez	Davao City	Eliminated
Episode 16 (June 15, 2019)	8	Power Pop Boys	"Stitches" – Shawn Mendes	Nic Galano	Iligan City, Isabela	Eliminated
Episode 16 (June 15, 2019)	9	3 And 1	"Dancing On My Own" – Calum Scott	Ibrahim Onggo	Digos	Advanced
Episode 16 (June 15, 2019)	9	3 And 1	"Dancing On My Own" – Calum Scott	Jeremiah Torayno	Cagayan de Oro City	Advanced
Episode 16 (June 15, 2019)	9	3 And 1	"Dancing On My Own" – Calum Scott	Kier King	Sultan Kudarat	Advanced
Episode 16 (June 15, 2019)	9	3 And 1	"Dancing On My Own" – Calum Scott	Ramil Permegones	Lucena City	Advanced

=== Do or Die round ===
In the Do or Die round, the judges divided the remaining Idol hopefuls into six and selected a song for them to perform. At the end of the second round, twenty contestants remained. The male hopefuls performed pop hits from female artists, while the female hopefuls performed hits from OPM Rock bands.

Color key:

Contestant was chosen by the judges to advance to the solo round
Contestant was eliminated

Episode	Order	Song	Contestant	Result
Episode 17 (June 16, 2019)	1	"I Have Nothing" – Whitney Houston	Renwick Benito	Advanced
Episode 17 (June 16, 2019)	1	"I Have Nothing" – Whitney Houston	Ibrahim Onggo	Eliminated
Episode 17 (June 16, 2019)	1	"I Have Nothing" – Whitney Houston	Jasper Lacson	Advanced
Episode 17 (June 16, 2019)	1	"I Have Nothing" – Whitney Houston	Kier King	Eliminated
Episode 17 (June 16, 2019)	1	"I Have Nothing" – Whitney Houston	Rainier Natividad	Eliminated
Episode 17 (June 16, 2019)	1	"I Have Nothing" – Whitney Houston	Matty Juniosa	Advanced
Episode 17 (June 16, 2019)	2	"Himala" – Rivermaya	Fatima Louise	Advanced
Episode 17 (June 16, 2019)	2	"Himala" – Rivermaya	Alyssa Quijano	Eliminated
Episode 17 (June 16, 2019)	2	"Himala" – Rivermaya	Mia Villaflores	Eliminated
Episode 17 (June 16, 2019)	2	"Himala" – Rivermaya	Yarah Estrella	Eliminated
Episode 17 (June 16, 2019)	2	"Himala" – Rivermaya	Krissha Viaje	Eliminated
Episode 17 (June 16, 2019)	2	"Himala" – Rivermaya	Erika Tenorio	Eliminated
Episode 17 (June 16, 2019)	2	"Himala" – Rivermaya	Michelle Primavera	Advanced
Episode 17 (June 16, 2019)	3	"I'll Never Love Again" – Lady Gaga	Carlo Bautista	Eliminated
Episode 17 (June 16, 2019)	3	"I'll Never Love Again" – Lady Gaga	Kevin Hermogenes	Advanced
Episode 17 (June 16, 2019)	3	"I'll Never Love Again" – Lady Gaga	Dan Ombao	Advanced
Episode 17 (June 16, 2019)	3	"I'll Never Love Again" – Lady Gaga	Isaiah Tiglao	Eliminated
Episode 17 (June 16, 2019)	3	"I'll Never Love Again" – Lady Gaga	Roque Belino	Advanced
Episode 17 (June 16, 2019)	3	"I'll Never Love Again" – Lady Gaga	Enzo Almario	Advanced
Episode 17 (June 16, 2019)	4	"Narda" – Kamikazee	Vanya Castor	Eliminated
Episode 17 (June 16, 2019)	4	"Narda" – Kamikazee	Ameurfina Martinez III	Eliminated
Episode 17 (June 16, 2019)	4	"Narda" – Kamikazee	Julia Joaquin	Eliminated
Episode 17 (June 16, 2019)	4	"Narda" – Kamikazee	Trish Bonilla	Advanced
Episode 17 (June 16, 2019)	4	"Narda" – Kamikazee	Charmagne Algario	Advanced
Episode 17 (June 16, 2019)	4	"Narda" – Kamikazee	Rachel Libres	Advanced
Episode 17 (June 16, 2019)	4	"Narda" – Kamikazee	Sheland Faelnar	Advanced
Episode 17 (June 16, 2019)	5	"My All" – Mariah Carey	Lucas Garcia	Advanced
Episode 17 (June 16, 2019)	5	"My All" – Mariah Carey	Ramil Permigones	Eliminated
Episode 17 (June 16, 2019)	5	"My All" – Mariah Carey	Miguel Odron	Advanced
Episode 17 (June 16, 2019)	5	"My All" – Mariah Carey	Trix Corpez	Eliminated
Episode 17 (June 16, 2019)	5	"My All" – Mariah Carey	Gello Marquez	Eliminated
Episode 17 (June 16, 2019)	5	"My All" – Mariah Carey	Lance Busa	Advanced
Episode 17 (June 16, 2019)	6	"Ang Huling El Bimbo" – Eraserheads	Denize Castillo	Advanced
Episode 17 (June 16, 2019)	6	"Ang Huling El Bimbo" – Eraserheads	Zephanie Dimaranan	Advanced
Episode 17 (June 16, 2019)	6	"Ang Huling El Bimbo" – Eraserheads	Diane Vergoza	Eliminated
Episode 17 (June 16, 2019)	6	"Ang Huling El Bimbo" – Eraserheads	Elle Ocampo	Advanced
Episode 17 (June 16, 2019)	6	"Ang Huling El Bimbo" – Eraserheads	Angie Kristine Gorbulev	Eliminated
Episode 17 (June 16, 2019)	6	"Ang Huling El Bimbo" – Eraserheads	Jeremiah Torayno	Advanced
Episode 17 (June 16, 2019)	6	"Ang Huling El Bimbo" – Eraserheads	Jehramae Trangia	Eliminated

=== Solo round ===
The Solo round is the final round of the Theater Rounds where the remaining Idol hopefuls pick a solo song. Only the twelve hopefuls proceeded to the Live shows. The first episode aired the performances of the female Idol hopefuls; while the second episode aired the performances of the male Idol hopefuls.

Color key:

Contestant was chosen by the judges to advance to the live shows
Contestant was eliminated

Episode	Order	Contestant	Song	Result
Episode 18 (June 22, 2019)	1	Zephanie Dimaranan	"I Believe" – Fantasia	Advanced
Episode 18 (June 22, 2019)	2	Fatima Louise Lagueras	"Feeling Good" – Michael Bublé	Advanced
Episode 18 (June 22, 2019)	3	Rachel Libres	"Maybe This Time" – Sarah Geronimo	Advanced
Episode 18 (June 22, 2019)	4	Charmagne Algario	"Stand Up for Love" – Destiny's Child	Eliminated
Episode 18 (June 22, 2019)	5	Trish Bonilla	"One Night Only" – Jennifer Hudson	Advanced
Episode 18 (June 22, 2019)	6	Michelle Primavera	"Banal Na Aso, Santong Kabayo" – Yano	Eliminated
Episode 18 (June 22, 2019)	7	Denize Castillo	"Buwan" – Juan Karlos	Eliminated
Episode 18 (June 22, 2019)	8	Elle Ocampo	"Ride" – Twenty One Pilots	Advanced
Episode 18 (June 22, 2019)	9	Jeremiah Torayno	"Lay Me Down" – Sam Smith	Eliminated
Episode 18 (June 22, 2019)	10	Sheland Faelnar	"Clarity" – Zedd feat. Foxes	Advanced
Episode 19 (June 23, 2019)	1	Matty Juniosa	"Proud Mary" – Tina Turner	Advanced
Episode 19 (June 23, 2019)	2	Renwick Benito	"Kasalanan" – Orient Pearl	Advanced
Episode 19 (June 23, 2019)	3	Lance Busa	"Ordinary People" – John Legend	Advanced
Episode 19 (June 23, 2019)	4	Roque Belino	"Over and Over Again" – Nathan Sykes	Eliminated
Episode 19 (June 23, 2019)	5	Enzo Almario	"Too Good at Goodbyes" – Sam Smith	Eliminated
Episode 19 (June 23, 2019)	6	Dan Ombao	"I See Fire" – Ed Sheeran	Advanced
Episode 19 (June 23, 2019)	7	Jasper Lacson	"Lately" – Stevie Wonder	Eliminated
Episode 19 (June 23, 2019)	8	Kevin Hermogenes	"I Didn't Know My Own Strength" – Whitney Houston	Eliminated
Episode 19 (June 23, 2019)	9	Lucas Garcia	"If I Ain't Got You" – Alicia Keys	Advanced
Episode 19 (June 23, 2019)	10	Miguel Odron	"Sorry Seems to Be the Hardest Word" – Elton John	Advanced

== Live shows ==
For the first time in the Idol franchise, the judges determined half of the contestants' score while the public determined the other half via public vote. The Hopefuls with the lowest scores were eliminated in varying amounts per week with the best possible score a contestant can receive is 100% per the format the network uses in scoring.

Color key:

Contestant was saved by the public and judges' votes
Contestant was in the bottom group
Contestant was eliminated

=== Week 1: Top 12 – Songs of Ryan Cayabyab (June 29 & 30) ===
For the first week of the Live Shows, the Top 12 performed songs sung or composed by OPM Icon and National Artist Ryan Cayabyab with Cayabyab also serving as guest mentor.

Episode	Order	Contestant	Song	Score	Result
Episode 20 (June 29, 2019)	1	Lance Busa	"Kay Ganda ng Ating Musika" - Hajji Alejandro	56.61%	Safe
Episode 20 (June 29, 2019)	2	Trish Bonilla	"Kailan" - Smokey Mountain	55.38%	Safe
Episode 20 (June 29, 2019)	3	Lucas Garcia	"Sometime, Somewhere" - Basil Valdez	71.85%	Safe
Episode 20 (June 29, 2019)	4	Matty Juniosa	"Nais Ko" - Basil Valdez	50.5%	Eliminated
Episode 20 (June 29, 2019)	5	Elle Ocampo	"Paraisong Parisukat" - Basil Valdez	51.81%	Bottom three
Episode 20 (June 29, 2019)	6	Dan Ombao	"Tuwing Umuulan at Kapiling Ka" - Basil Valdez	83.73%	Safe
Episode 20 (June 29, 2019)	7	Sheland Faelnar	"Tunay na Ligaya" - Basil Valdez	60.67%	Safe
Episode 21 (June 30, 2019)	8	Renwick Benito	"Araw-Gabi" - Nonoy Zuñiga	53.41%	Safe
Episode 21 (June 30, 2019)	9	Fatima Louise	"Limang Dipang Tao" - Celeste Legaspi	66.2%	Safe
Episode 21 (June 30, 2019)	10	Zephanie Dimaranan	"Paraiso" - Smokey Mountain	99.75%	Safe
Episode 21 (June 30, 2019)	11	Miguel Odron	"Kahit Ika'y Panaginip Lang" - Basil Valdez	63.73%	Safe
Episode 21 (June 30, 2019)	12	Rachel Libres	"Paano Na Kaya?" - Bugoy Drilon	50.52%	Eliminated

Non-competition performances
Order	Performers	Song
21.1	Moira Dela Torre and I Belong To The Zoo	"Patawad, Paalam"

=== Week 2: Top 10 – The Champions (July 6 & 7) ===
For Week 2, the Top 10 performed songs written or performed by Star in a Million winner Erik Santos and Pinoy Dream Academy winner Yeng Constantino. Santos and Constantino also mentored the Top 10.

Episode	Order	Contestant	Song	Score	Result
Episode 22 (July 6, 2019)	1	Trish Bonilla	"Pagbigyang Muli" - Erik Santos	50.67%	Eliminated
Episode 22 (July 6, 2019)	2	Renwick Benito	"Hawak Kamay" - Yeng Constantino	51.49%	Eliminated
Episode 22 (July 6, 2019)	3	Elle Ocampo	"Ikaw" - Yeng Constantino	66.17%	Safe
Episode 22 (July 6, 2019)	4	Lance Busa	"Ako Muna" - Yeng Constantino	58.49%	Bottom four
Episode 22 (July 6, 2019)	5	Lucas Garcia	"Lupa" - Erik Santos	75.24%	Safe
Episode 22 (July 6, 2019)	6	Zephanie Dimaranan	"Salamat" - Yeng Constantino	92.18%	Safe
Episode 23 (July 7, 2019)	7	Sheland Faelnar	"Pangarap Lang" - Yeng Constantino	54.77%	Bottom four
Episode 23 (July 7, 2019)	8	Miguel Odron	"Kung Akin Ang Mundo" - Erik Santos	75.74%	Safe
Episode 23 (July 7, 2019)	9	Fatima Louise	"I'll Never Go" - Erik Santos	61.01%	Safe
Episode 23 (July 7, 2019)	10	Dan Ombao	"Cool Off" - Yeng Constantino	99.88%	Safe

Non-competition performances
Order	Performers	Song
23.1	Billy Crawford and James Reid	"Girls Like You" / "Filipina Girl"

=== Week 3: Top 8 – Philippines’ Most Streamed Hits (July 13 & 14) ===
For Week 3, the Top 8 performed the Philippines’ most streamed hits. Morissette served as guest mentor.

Episode	Order	Contestant	Song	Score	Result
Episode 24 (July 13, 2019)	1	Fatima Louise	"Kathang Isip" - Ben&Ben	52.13%	Eliminated
Episode 24 (July 13, 2019)	2	Lance Busa	"Sana" - I Belong to the Zoo	56.49%	Bottom four
Episode 24 (July 13, 2019)	3	Sheland Faelnar	"Hindi Na Nga" - This Band	52.27%	Eliminated
Episode 24 (July 13, 2019)	4	Zephanie Dimaranan	"Isa Pang Araw" - Sarah Geronimo	99.88%	Safe
Episode 24 (July 13, 2019)	5	Dan Ombao	"Kung 'di Rin Lang Ikaw" - December Avenue & Moira Dela Torre	77.73%	Safe
Episode 25 (July 14, 2019)	6	Elle Ocampo	"Story of My Life" - One Direction	54.7%	Bottom four
Episode 25 (July 14, 2019)	7	Miguel Odron	"Scars to Your Beautiful" - Alessia Cara	67.53%	Safe
Episode 25 (July 14, 2019)	8	Lucas Garcia	"Tagpuan" - Moira Dela Torre	98.36%	Safe

Non-competition performances
Order	Performers	Song
25.1	Regine Velasquez and Pinopela	"Halo"

=== Week 4: Top 6 – Songs of Gary Valenciano (July 20 & 21) ===
For Week 4, the Top 6 performed songs by singer-songwriter Gary Valenciano. He also served as guest mentor.

Episode	Order	Contestant	Song	Score	Result
Episode 26 (July 20, 2019)	1	Lance Busa	"Paano" - Gary Valenciano	56.57%	Bottom two
Episode 26 (July 20, 2019)	2	Miguel Odron	"How Did You Know" - Gary Valenciano	56.65%	Safe
Episode 26 (July 20, 2019)	3	Elle Ocampo	"Sana Maulit Muli" - Gary Valenciano	50.27%	Eliminated
Episode 26 (July 20, 2019)	4	Zephanie Dimaranan	"Wag Ka Nang Umiyak" - Gary Valenciano	96.08%	Safe
Episode 27 (July 21, 2019)	5	Dan Ombao	"Kailangan Kita" - Gary Valenciano	73.45%	Safe
Episode 27 (July 21, 2019)	6	Lucas Garcia	"Ikaw Lamang" - Gary Valenciano	99.88%	Safe

Non-competition performances
Order	Performers	Song
27.1	Bugoy Drilon, Daryl Ong, Michael Pangilinan, and Vice Ganda	"Get Here"

=== Week 5: The Final Showdown (July 27 & 28) ===
==== Part 1 - Top 5 ====
The Top 5 performed live at Newport Performing Arts Theater in Resorts World Manila on July 27, 2019. Two contestants were eliminated by the end of night one, leaving the Top 3 to battle it out on July 28, 2019. In addition to the competition pieces sung by the Top 5, female winners from different singing competitions performed songs sung by American Idol winners as special guests.

Episode	Order	Contestant	Song	Score	Result
Episode 28 (Saturday July 27, 2019)	1	Dan Ombao	"The Last Time" - Eric Benet	62.48%	Eliminated
Episode 28 (Saturday July 27, 2019)	2	Miguel Odron	"Rise Up" - Andra Day	53.39%	Eliminated
Episode 28 (Saturday July 27, 2019)	3	Zephanie Dimaranan	"Lipad ng Pangarap" - Dessa	99.88%	Safe
Episode 28 (Saturday July 27, 2019)	4	Lucas Garcia	"Bulag, Pipi at Bingi" - Freddie Aguilar	83.81%	Safe
Episode 28 (Saturday July 27, 2019)	5	Lance Busa	"Lean on Me" - Bill Withers	69.45%	Bottom three

Non-competition performances
Order	Performers	Song
28.1	Lance Busa, Lucas Garcia and Dan Ombao with Jona and Elha Nympha	"I Believe" - Fantasia
28.2	Zephanie Dimaranan and Miguel Odron with Janine Berdin and KZ Tandingan	"A Moment Like This" - Kelly Clarkson
28.3	Top 5 with Janine Berdin, Elha Nympha, KZ Tandingan and Jona	"This Is My Now" - Jordin Sparks

==== Part 2 - Top 3 ====
The Top 3 performed live at Newport Performing Arts Theater in Resorts World Manila on July 28, 2019. The winner was announced at the end of the show.

Contestant	Episode 29 (Sunday, July 28, 2019)				Score	Result
Contestant	Round 1		Round 2		Score	Result
Contestant	Order	Song	Order	Song	Score	Result
Zephanie Dimaranan	1	"Maghintay Ka Lamang" - Ted Ito	1	"Pangarap Kong Pangarap Mo"	100%	Winner
Lucas Garcia	2	"Hanggang" - Wency Cornejo	3	"Because You Believed"	70.2%	Runner-up
Lance Busa	3	"Akin Ka Na Lang" - Morissette	2	"Kapit Lang"	41.89%	Eliminated

Non-competition performances
Order	Performers	Song
29.1	Jessica Sanchez	"And I Am Telling You I'm Not Going"

== Elimination chart ==
Color key

Female contestant
Male contestant
Winner
Runner-up
Third place
Did not perform
Not Chosen
Saved by Judges
Safe
Highest Score
Bottom Group
Eliminated

Results per round
Place	Contestant	Top 20		Top 12	Top 10	Top 8	Top 6	Finale	
Place	Contestant	Top 20		Top 12	Top 10	Top 8	Top 6	Top 5	Top 3
Place	Contestant	6/22	6/23	6/30	7/7	7/14	7/21	7/27	7/28
1	Zephanie Dimaranan	Safe	N/A	1st 99.75%	2nd 92.18%	1st 99.88%	2nd 96.08%	1st 99.88%	Winner; 100.00%
2	Lucas Garcia	N/A	Safe	3rd 71.85%	4th 75.24%	2nd 98.36%	1st 99.88%	2nd 83.81%	Runner-up; 70.20%
3	Lance Busa	N/A	Safe	7th 56.61%	7th 58.49%	5th 56.49%	5th 56.57%	3rd 69.45%	Third place 41.89%
4	Dan Ombao	N/A	Safe	2nd 83.73%	1st 99.88%	3rd 77.73%	3rd 73.45%	4th 62.48%	
5	Miguel Odron	N/A	Safe	5th 63.73%	3rd 75.74%	4th 67.53%	4th 56.65%	5th 53.39%	
6	Elle Ocampo	Safe	N/A	10th 51.81%	5th 66.17%	6th 54.70%	6th 50.27%		
7	Sheland Faelnar	Safe	N/A	6th 60.67%	8th 54.77%	7th 52.27%			
8	Fatima Louise	Safe	N/A	4th 66.20%	6th 61.01%	8th 52.13%			
9	Renwick Benito	N/A	Safe	9th 53.41%	9th 51.49%				
10	Trish Bonilla	Safe	N/A	8th 55.38%	10th 50.67%				
11	Rachel Libres	Safe	N/A	11th 50.52%					
12	Matty Juniosa	N/A	Safe	12th 50.50%					
13–20	Enzo Almario	N/A	Eliminated						
13–20	Jasper Lacson	N/A	Eliminated						
13–20	Kevin Hermogenes	N/A	Eliminated						
13–20	Roque Belino	N/A	Eliminated						
13–20	Charmagne Algario	Eliminated							
13–20	Denize Castillo	Eliminated							
13–20	Jeremiah Torayno	Eliminated							
13–20	Michelle Primavera	Eliminated							

== Reception ==
=== Critical response ===
The televised auditions for the first season was met with mixed public reception. Netizens questioned Dela Torre and Reid's credibility as judges, although Reid was praised for his frankness. The show was compared in a negative light to other singing competitions, including The Voice of The Philippines, specially following the aftermath of the rejection of reggae artist Luke Baylon, in which only one judge, Velasquez voted to advance Baylon into the next round. Amid the criticism, Velasquez defended her fellow judges in an interview with reporters during the 35th PMPC Awards for movies, stating that "the three were chosen to be at the judging table because of their individual expertise".
