= Idol Philippines season 2 =

Idol Philippines
- Season 2
- Hosted by: Robi Domingo
- Judges: Regine Velasquez; Moira Dela Torre; Gary Valenciano; Chito Miranda
- Winner: Khimo Gumatay
- Runner-up: Ryssi Avila
- Companion show: The Next Idol PH (Digital)
- No. of episodes: 26

Release
- Original network: Kapamilya Channel (Note: The show also aired on A2Z and TV5)
- Original release: June 25 – September 18, 2022

Season chronology
- ← Previous; Season 1

The second season of the reality singing television competition Idol Philippines aired on Kapamilya Channel, A2Z, and TV5 from June 25 to September 18, 2022. It replaced My Papa Pi and Pinoy Big Brother: Kumunity Season 10 and was succeeded by the second season of Everybody, Sing!. This was the first season not to air on ABS-CBN after the network was ordered by the National Telecommunications Commission (NTC) and Solicitor General Jose Calida to cease its free-to-air television and radio broadcast operations on May 5, 2020, following the expiration of its congressional franchise.

The season was hosted by Robi Domingo, who replaced Billy Crawford after his departure from the network. Regine Velasquez and Moira Dela Torre returned to the judging panel, joined by new judges Gary Valenciano and Chito Miranda.

Khimo Gumatay of Makati emerged as the winner, securing an exclusive recording contract with ABS-CBN Music and a ₱1,000,000 cash prize. Ryssi Avila of Bacoor, Cavite finished as the runner-up, with Kice placing third.

== Overview ==
=== Development ===
The second season was first confirmed during the final episode of the first season, although its fate remained uncertain after the National Telecommunications Commission and Solicitor General Jose Calida issued a cease-and-desist order to ABS-CBN amid the Enhanced community quarantine in Luzon, which was implemented to combat the COVID-19 pandemic in the Philippines. This order effectively halted the network's free-to-air broadcasting operations. In the aftermath, including the denial of the franchise, layoffs, and the loss of frequencies, host Billy Crawford and director Bobet Vidanes transferred to blocktimer shows aired on TV5. However, it was announced on April 25, 2022, that the show would return. Auditions for the season opened the following day.

=== Broadcast ===
The second season aired on Kapamilya Channel and A2Z at 7:00 p.m. every weekend, taking over the timeslot previously occupied by the tenth season of the reality show Pinoy Big Brother, which aired its last post-season special on June 19, 2022. Additionally, TV5 also aired the season, marking the first time the network has broadcast an iteration of the Idol franchise since Philippine Idol in 2006. TV5 aired the season at 8:30 p.m. on Saturdays and 9:00 p.m. on Sundays, taking over the timeslot previously held by the second season of the reality singing competition Masked Singer Pilipinas, which aired its finale on June 18, 2022.

==== Online companion show ====
An online show titled The Next Idol PH aired on the show's UpLive account and on Kapamilya Online Live during commercial breaks. Hosted by former contestants Anji Salvacion, Matty Juniosa, Enzo Almario, Lucas Garcia, Gello Marquez, Fana, and Shanaia Gomez, (Note: Zephanie was the grand winner of the first season, however, she transferred to GMA Network before the second season was announced.) the show is broadcast live via Zoom from the hosts' respective locations during the show's broadcast (prior to the live gala) or from the Idol Philippines studio (during the live gala). The show typically features interviews with the season's contestants following their performances on the main broadcast.

=== Sponsorships ===
The show partnered with the video social media platform UpLive, which hosted the online auditions. The platform also aired the show's online companion show, The Next Idol PH, which is hosted by former contestants.

=== Prizes ===
The winner of the season received an exclusive recording contract from ABS-CBN Music, as well as a ₱1,000,000 cash prize. They also received a franchise from Dermacare and a house and lot from Camella Homes valued at ₱2,500,000.

=== Marketing ===
Idol Philippines launched its own non-fungible token (NFT) collection featuring the show's logo, tickets, and the likeness of the contestants as part of a promotion. It became the first Philippine television program to launch its own NFT collection.

== Judges and host ==
Judges and host of Idol Philippines season 2

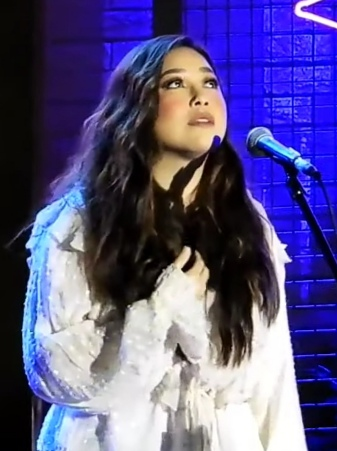
Moira Dela Torre

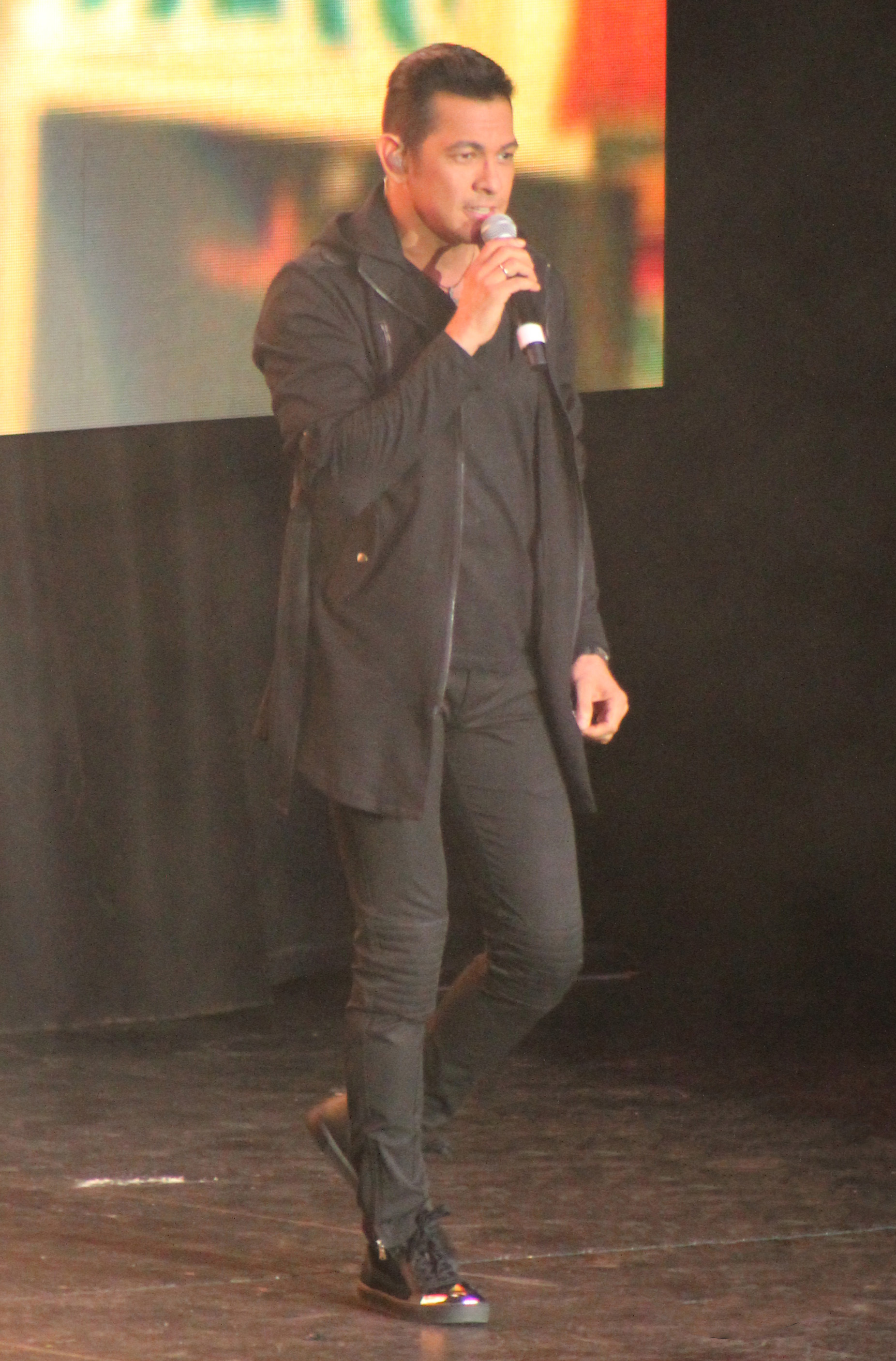
Gary Valenciano

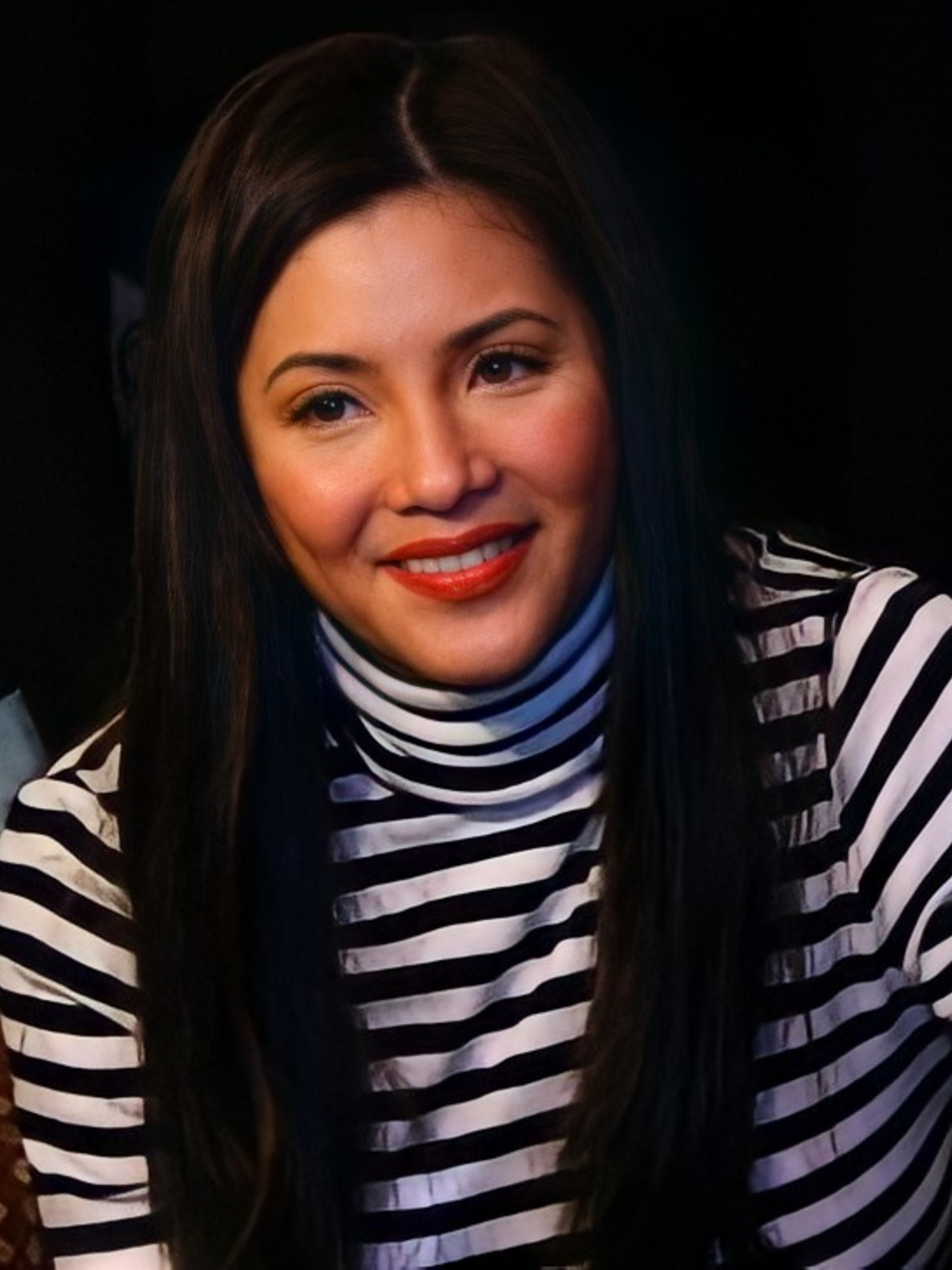
Regine Velasquez

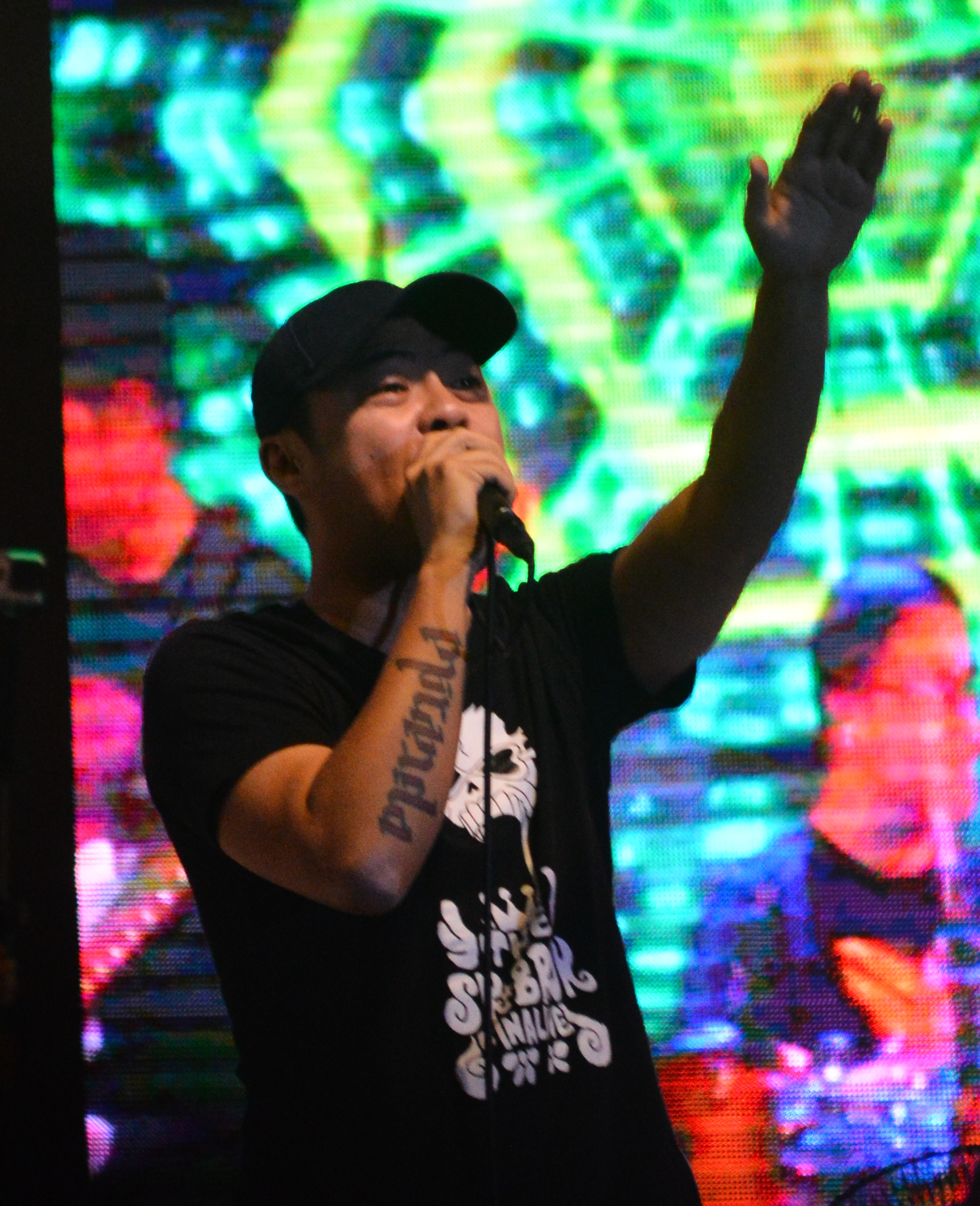
Chito Miranda

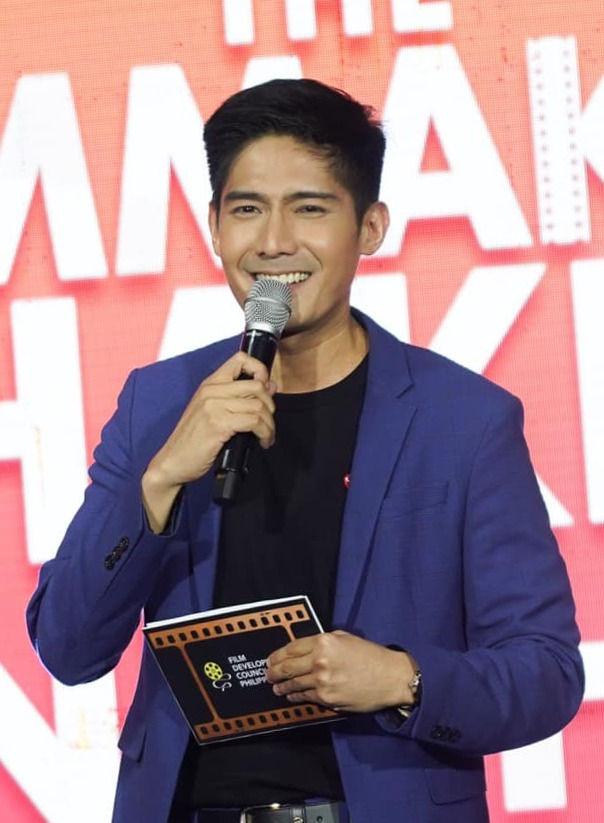
Robi Domingo

On May 20, 2022, during a broadcast of the news program TV Patrol, the roster of judges for the season was revealed. Of the four judges from the previous season, only Regine Velasquez and Moira Dela Torre returned, with James Reid and Vice Ganda departing from the judging panel. They were replaced by singer-songwriter Gary Valenciano and Parokya ni Edgar frontman Chito Miranda. Two days later, at a launch party on ASAP Natin 'To!, it was announced that Robi Domingo would be the new host, replacing Billy Crawford, who left for blocktimer shows on other networks.

Comedian Ogie Diaz later revealed that Vice Ganda backed out of the show after learning that Sarah Geronimo was initially slated to be a judge but withdrew due to personal responsibilities. Meanwhile, James Reid was unable to return for the season as he was residing abroad to pursue an international career.

== Auditions ==
The initial auditions for the season opened on April 25, 2022, for Idol hopefuls aged 16 to 28 years old. Due to restrictions related to the COVID-19 pandemic in the Philippines, all initial auditions were held online, eliminating the open-call audition process used in the previous season. Those selected by the producers to audition in front of the judges performed at the ABS-CBN Studio in Quezon City. To advance and receive a golden ticket to Idol City, an auditionee needed to receive at least three "yes" votes from the judges. Occasionally, a judge might award a platinum ticket instead of a golden ticket.

At the start of the season premiere, former contestants Anji Salvacion, Gello Marquez, Shanaia Gomez, Fana, iDolls members Matty Juniosa, Enzo Almario, and season 1 runner-up Lucas Garcia performed a rendition of Andra Day's "Rise Up". Throughout the course of the auditions, a total of 72 Idol hopefuls received a ticket to Idol City, with four of them receiving a platinum ticket. However, some auditions were not aired due to undisclosed reasons. .

Summary of the auditions for Idol Philippines season 2
Episode	Air Date	No. of Auditionees	Advanced	Ref.
1	June 25, 2022	4	3	
2	June 26, 2022	5	3	
3	July 2, 2022	4	3	
4	July 3, 2022	4	3	–
5	July 9, 2022	5	4	–
6	July 10, 2022	6	4	–
7	July 16, 2022	7	5	–
8	July 17, 2022	5	3	–
9	July 23, 2022	8	7	–
10	July 24, 2022	6	4	–
11	July 30, 2022	11	11	–
12	July 31, 2022	5	5	–
Unaired		—N/a	17	–
Total No. of Contestants		>72	72	

=== Platinum ticket ===
This season introduced the Platinum Ticket, derived from the platinum ticket first introduced in the twentieth season of American Idol. A platinum ticket allows its recipient to advance directly to the solo round of the Middle Rounds. The judges are given one opportunity to award a platinum ticket to a contestant of their choice. Only one judge is allowed to award a ticket per audition.

Platinum Ticket Recipients for Idol Philippines season 2
Judge	Recipient	Age	Hometown	Date	Song(s)	Original Artist	Ref.
Gary Valenciano	Kimberly Baculo	17	Mabini, Batangas	June 26, 2022	"Isang Linggong Pag-ibig"	Imelda Papin (KZ Tandingan cover)	
Regine Velasquez	Dominic Hatol	26	Trece Martires, Cavite	July 3, 2022	"Hanggang Dito na Lang"	Jaya	
Moira Dela Torre	Ryssi Avila	21	Bacoor, Cavite	July 9, 2022	"Alipin"	Shamrock (Regine Velasquez cover)	
Chito Miranda	Chester Padilla	26	Pampanga	July 24, 2022	"With a Smile"	Eraserheads	

== Competition summary ==
Color key

Winner
Runner-up
Eliminated in the Live Gala
Eliminated in the Middle Rounds – Solo Round
Eliminated in the Middle Rounds – Do-or-Die Round
Eliminated in the Middle Rounds – Group Round

Top 72 contestants
Khimo Gumatay	Ryssi Avila	Kice	Bryan Chong	Ann Raniel
Delly Cuales	PJ Fabia	Trisha Gomez	Nisha Bedaña	Misha de Leon
Drei Sugay	Anthony Meneses	Chester Padilla	Darius Miguel	Dominic Hatol
Esay Belanio	Isaac Zamudio	Jarea Ifurung	Jean Flores	Kimberly Baculo
Alnie Caparoso	Bea Tan	Beverlyn Silva	Bino Serito	Brei Binuya
Brio Divinagracia	Carmela Ariola	Chloe Redondo	Christian Tibayan	Dior Bronia
EJ Ballebar	Gyla Casero	Hannah Castillo	Hanzel Lax	Jaime Kliatchko
Jerold Tamayo	Justin Ortega	Kian Joy Guarin	Lecelle Trinidad	Mark Barda
Max Macaraig	Mikko Estrada	Paul Macalindong	Ranella Katrice Robles	Rexie Ramilo
Ryan Gabriel Ayangco	Steph Samson	Thias	A.K. de Guzman	Aly Amores
Anton Juarez	Asha Trinidad	Benedict Vinluan	Bianca Dimaculangan	Breanna Villapaz
Christian Imperial	Cyra Lee Baranda	Dave Maramag	Eian Bryle	Gian Franco
Jade Manalo	JB Pallarca	Jimsen Jison	Job Tolonghari	Karlo Winffotter
Mariel Baguio	Melanie Guevarra	Paul Hernandez	Rizzia Alcantara	Stef Payusan
Ver Aquino	Yuri Javier			
Note: Underlined names are platinum ticket holders.

== Middle rounds ==
The middle rounds were held at the ABS-CBN studios in Quezon City and consisted of three stages: the Group, Do or Die, and Solo rounds. At the end of these rounds, twelve contestants remained to compete for the title of Idol Philippines.

Color key:

Contestant was chosen by the judges to advance to the next round
Contestant was eliminated

=== Group round ===
The golden ticket holders were divided into fourteen groups named after their respective members. Each group selected a song to perform from a wall containing several song titles. After a group's performance, the judges chose an indefinite number of contestants to advance to the next round. The first performances of the Group round were aired in the latter half of Episode 12, which aired on July 31, 2022. At the end of the group rounds, forty-four contestants remained.

Results of the Group Round
Episode	Order	Group	Song	Contestant	Hometown	Result
Episode 12 (July 31, 2022)	1	In Girls	"Out" – Fana	Asha Trinidad	Tandang Sora, Quezon City	Eliminated
Episode 12 (July 31, 2022)	1	In Girls	"Out" – Fana	Delly Cuales	Santiago, Isabela	Advanced
Episode 12 (July 31, 2022)	1	In Girls	"Out" – Fana	Esay Belanio	Iloilo City	Advanced
Episode 12 (July 31, 2022)	1	In Girls	"Out" – Fana	Jarea Ifurung	San Pedro, Laguna	Advanced
Episode 12 (July 31, 2022)	1	In Girls	"Out" – Fana	Yuri Javier	Cabuyao, Laguna	Eliminated
Episode 12 (July 31, 2022)	2	Ballad to the 5th Power	"Muli" – Rodel Naval (Bugoy Drilon cover)	Alnie Caparoso	Cebu City	Advanced
Episode 12 (July 31, 2022)	2	Ballad to the 5th Power	"Muli" – Rodel Naval (Bugoy Drilon cover)	EJ Ballebar	Bula, Camarines Sur	Advanced
Episode 12 (July 31, 2022)	2	Ballad to the 5th Power	"Muli" – Rodel Naval (Bugoy Drilon cover)	Hanzel Lax	Trece Martires, Cavite	Advanced
Episode 12 (July 31, 2022)	2	Ballad to the 5th Power	"Muli" – Rodel Naval (Bugoy Drilon cover)	Isaac Zamudio	Mandaluyong	Advanced
Episode 12 (July 31, 2022)	2	Ballad to the 5th Power	"Muli" – Rodel Naval (Bugoy Drilon cover)	Justin Ortega	San Fernando, La Union	Advanced
Episode 13 (August 6, 2022)	1	Metafour	"Sandalan" – 6cyclemind	Ann Raniel	San Pablo, Laguna	Advanced
Episode 13 (August 6, 2022)	1	Metafour	"Sandalan" – 6cyclemind	Carmela Ariola	Mataas na Kahoy, Batangas	Advanced
Episode 13 (August 6, 2022)	1	Metafour	"Sandalan" – 6cyclemind	Nisha Bedaña	Las Piñas City	Advanced
Episode 13 (August 6, 2022)	1	Metafour	"Sandalan" – 6cyclemind	Stef Payusan	Santo Tomas, Batangas	Eliminated
Episode 13 (August 6, 2022)	2	SoulSisters	"Sigurado" – Belle Mariano	Beverly Silva	Lipa, Batangas	Advanced
Episode 13 (August 6, 2022)	2	SoulSisters	"Sigurado" – Belle Mariano	Brei Binuya	Tondo, Manila	Advanced
Episode 13 (August 6, 2022)	2	SoulSisters	"Sigurado" – Belle Mariano	Gyla Casero	San Pedro, Laguna	Advanced
Episode 13 (August 6, 2022)	2	SoulSisters	"Sigurado" – Belle Mariano	Kian Joy Guarin	Tanza, Cavite	Advanced
Episode 13 (August 6, 2022)	2	SoulSisters	"Sigurado" – Belle Mariano	Misha De Leon	Santa Rosa, Laguna	Advanced
Episode 13 (August 6, 2022)	3	I Will Sur-Five	"Chasing Pavements" – Adele	Bea Tan	Santa Rosa, Laguna	Advanced
Episode 13 (August 6, 2022)	3	I Will Sur-Five	"Chasing Pavements" – Adele	Cyra Lee Baranda	Roxas, Capiz	Eliminated
Episode 13 (August 6, 2022)	3	I Will Sur-Five	"Chasing Pavements" – Adele	Mariel Baguio	Cebu	Eliminated
Episode 13 (August 6, 2022)	3	I Will Sur-Five	"Chasing Pavements" – Adele	Ranella Katrice Robles	Santo Tomas, Batangas	Advanced
Episode 13 (August 6, 2022)	3	I Will Sur-Five	"Chasing Pavements" – Adele	Steph Samson	Dasmariñas, Cavite	Advanced
Episode 13 (August 6, 2022)	4	Soul'd Out	"Lean on Me" – Bill Withers	Christian Imperial	San Pedro, Laguna	Eliminated
Episode 13 (August 6, 2022)	4	Soul'd Out	"Lean on Me" – Bill Withers	Dior Bronia	Tatalon, Quezon City	Advanced
Episode 13 (August 6, 2022)	4	Soul'd Out	"Lean on Me" – Bill Withers	Jaime Kliatchko	Santa Rosa, Laguna	Advanced
Episode 13 (August 6, 2022)	4	Soul'd Out	"Lean on Me" – Bill Withers	Jerold Tamayo	Cabanatuan	Advanced
Episode 13 (August 6, 2022)	4	Soul'd Out	"Lean on Me" – Bill Withers	PJ Fabia	Moncada, Tarlac	Advanced
Episode 13 (August 6, 2022)	5	Fifth Element	"Stay" – Cueshe	Dave Maramag	Gapan, Nueva Ecija	Eliminated
Episode 13 (August 6, 2022)	5	Fifth Element	"Stay" – Cueshe	Drei Sugay	San Juan City	Advanced
Episode 13 (August 6, 2022)	5	Fifth Element	"Stay" – Cueshe	Jimsen Jison	Quezon City	Eliminated
Episode 13 (August 6, 2022)	5	Fifth Element	"Stay" – Cueshe	Kice	Guimaras	Advanced
Episode 13 (August 6, 2022)	5	Fifth Element	"Stay" – Cueshe	Mark Barda	Antique	Advanced
Episode 13 (August 6, 2022)	6	G5	"Pagod Na Ako" – Janine Berdin	Aly Amores	Tanauan, Batangas	Eliminated
Episode 13 (August 6, 2022)	6	G5	"Pagod Na Ako" – Janine Berdin	Bianca Dimaculangan	Mataas na Kahoy, Batangas	Eliminated
Episode 13 (August 6, 2022)	6	G5	"Pagod Na Ako" – Janine Berdin	Jade Manalo	San Pablo, Laguna	Eliminated
Episode 13 (August 6, 2022)	6	G5	"Pagod Na Ako" – Janine Berdin	Rexie Ramilo	Santo Tomas, Batangas	Advanced
Episode 13 (August 6, 2022)	6	G5	"Pagod Na Ako" – Janine Berdin	Trisha Gomez	Dasmariñas, Cavite	Advanced
Episode 13 (August 6, 2022)	7	Daboiz PH	"This Love" – Maroon 5	Anthony Meneses	Las Piñas	Advanced
Episode 13 (August 6, 2022)	7	Daboiz PH	"This Love" – Maroon 5	Anton Juarez	Toledo City, Cebu	Eliminated
Episode 13 (August 6, 2022)	7	Daboiz PH	"This Love" – Maroon 5	Job Tolonghari	Loon, Bohol	Eliminated
Episode 13 (August 6, 2022)	7	Daboiz PH	"This Love" – Maroon 5	Max Macaraig	Lipa City, Batangas	Advanced
Episode 13 (August 6, 2022)	7	Daboiz PH	"This Love" – Maroon 5	Paul Hernandez	Tondo, Manila	Eliminated
Episode 13 (August 6, 2022)	8	HWC	"Marupok" – KZ Tandingan	Bino Serito	Subic, Zambales	Advanced
Episode 13 (August 6, 2022)	8	HWC	"Marupok" – KZ Tandingan	Brio Divinagracia	Quezon City	Advanced
Episode 13 (August 6, 2022)	8	HWC	"Marupok" – KZ Tandingan	Gian Franco	Bacoor, Cavite	Eliminated
Episode 13 (August 6, 2022)	8	HWC	"Marupok" – KZ Tandingan	Mikko Estrada	Antipolo	Advanced
Episode 13 (August 6, 2022)	8	HWC	"Marupok" – KZ Tandingan	Thias	Tanauan, Batangas	Advanced
Episode 13 (August 6, 2022)	9	Spice Girlz	"Golden Arrow" – Bini	Breanna Villapaz	Dasmariñas, Cavite	Eliminated
Episode 13 (August 6, 2022)	9	Spice Girlz	"Golden Arrow" – Bini	Jean Flores	Alaminos, Laguna	Advanced
Episode 13 (August 6, 2022)	9	Spice Girlz	"Golden Arrow" – Bini	Lecelle Trinidad	Gapan, Nueva Ecija	Advanced
Episode 13 (August 6, 2022)	9	Spice Girlz	"Golden Arrow" – Bini	Melanie Guevarra	Pasig City	Eliminated
Episode 13 (August 6, 2022)	9	Spice Girlz	"Golden Arrow" – Bini	Ver Aquino	Roxas, Capiz	Eliminated
Episode 13 (August 6, 2022)	10	Echo	"Raise Your Flag" – KZ Tandingan	Benedict Vinluan	Nueva Ecija	Eliminated
Episode 13 (August 6, 2022)	10	Echo	"Raise Your Flag" – KZ Tandingan	Christian Tibayan	Lipa City, Batangas	Advanced
Episode 13 (August 6, 2022)	10	Echo	"Raise Your Flag" – KZ Tandingan	Darius Miguel	Lipa City, Batangas	Advanced
Episode 13 (August 6, 2022)	10	Echo	"Raise Your Flag" – KZ Tandingan	Karlo Winffotter	Sta. Cruz, Manila	Eliminated
Episode 13 (August 6, 2022)	10	Echo	"Raise Your Flag" – KZ Tandingan	Ryan Gabriel Ayangco	Tayabas, Quezon	Advanced
Episode 13 (August 6, 2022)	11	Melodiques	"Superhero" – Rocksteddy	A.K. de Guzman	San Fernando City, Pampanga	Eliminated
Episode 13 (August 6, 2022)	11	Melodiques	"Superhero" – Rocksteddy	Chloe Redondo	Calamba, Laguna	Advanced
Episode 13 (August 6, 2022)	11	Melodiques	"Superhero" – Rocksteddy	Hannah Castillo	Diliman, Quezon City	Advanced
Episode 13 (August 6, 2022)	11	Melodiques	"Superhero" – Rocksteddy	Rizzia Alcantara	Bustos, Bulacan	Eliminated
Episode 13 (August 6, 2022)	12	Sadboyz II Men	"Kapag Ako Ay Nagmahal" – Jolina Magdangal	Bryan Chong	Angeles, Pampanga	Advanced
Episode 13 (August 6, 2022)	12	Sadboyz II Men	"Kapag Ako Ay Nagmahal" – Jolina Magdangal	Eian Bryle	Pavia, Iloilo	Eliminated
Episode 13 (August 6, 2022)	12	Sadboyz II Men	"Kapag Ako Ay Nagmahal" – Jolina Magdangal	JB Pallarca	Carranglan, Nueva Ecija	Eliminated
Episode 13 (August 6, 2022)	12	Sadboyz II Men	"Kapag Ako Ay Nagmahal" – Jolina Magdangal	Khimo Gumatay	Makati	Advanced
Episode 13 (August 6, 2022)	12	Sadboyz II Men	"Kapag Ako Ay Nagmahal" – Jolina Magdangal	Paul Macalindong	Makati	Advanced

=== Do or Die round ===
The remaining contestants were grouped by the judges and assigned a song to perform as a group. As in the previous round, the judges selected an indefinite number of contestants to advance to the next round at the end of each performance. This round aired on August 7, 2022. At the end of this round, twenty contestants remained.

Results of the Do-or-die Round
Episode	Order	Song	Contestant	Contestant
Episode 14 (August 7, 2022)	1	"Gusto Ko Nang Bumitaw" – Morissette	Isaac Zamudio	Advanced
Episode 14 (August 7, 2022)	1	"Gusto Ko Nang Bumitaw" – Morissette	Ryan Miguel Aycangco	Eliminated
Episode 14 (August 7, 2022)	1	"Gusto Ko Nang Bumitaw" – Morissette	Hanzel Lax	Eliminated
Episode 14 (August 7, 2022)	1	"Gusto Ko Nang Bumitaw" – Morissette	Mark Barda	Eliminated
Episode 14 (August 7, 2022)	1	"Gusto Ko Nang Bumitaw" – Morissette	Darius Miguel	Advanced
Episode 14 (August 7, 2022)	1	"Gusto Ko Nang Bumitaw" – Morissette	PJ Fabia	Advanced
Episode 14 (August 7, 2022)	2	"Defying Gravity" – Idina Menzel	Carmela Ariola	Eliminated
Episode 14 (August 7, 2022)	2	"Defying Gravity" – Idina Menzel	Rexie Ramilo	Eliminated
Episode 14 (August 7, 2022)	2	"Defying Gravity" – Idina Menzel	Jean Flores	Advanced
Episode 14 (August 7, 2022)	2	"Defying Gravity" – Idina Menzel	Esay Belanio	Advanced
Episode 14 (August 7, 2022)	2	"Defying Gravity" – Idina Menzel	Ann Raniel	Advanced
Episode 14 (August 7, 2022)	3	"I Want To Know What Love Is" – Foreigner	Bino Serito	Eliminated
Episode 14 (August 7, 2022)	3	"I Want To Know What Love Is" – Foreigner	Dior Bronia	Eliminated
Episode 14 (August 7, 2022)	3	"I Want To Know What Love Is" – Foreigner	Justin Ortega	Eliminated
Episode 14 (August 7, 2022)	3	"I Want To Know What Love Is" – Foreigner	Christian Tibayan	Eliminated
Episode 14 (August 7, 2022)	3	"I Want To Know What Love Is" – Foreigner	Khimo Gumatay	Advanced
Episode 14 (August 7, 2022)	3	"I Want To Know What Love Is" – Foreigner	Thias	Eliminated
Episode 14 (August 7, 2022)	4	"Don't Cry Out Loud" – Melissa Manchester	Hannah Castillo	Eliminated
Episode 14 (August 7, 2022)	4	"Don't Cry Out Loud" – Melissa Manchester	Delly Cuales	Advanced
Episode 14 (August 7, 2022)	4	"Don't Cry Out Loud" – Melissa Manchester	Kian Joy Guarin	Eliminated
Episode 14 (August 7, 2022)	4	"Don't Cry Out Loud" – Melissa Manchester	Bea Tan	Eliminated
Episode 14 (August 7, 2022)	4	"Don't Cry Out Loud" – Melissa Manchester	Lecelle Trinidad	Eliminated
Episode 14 (August 7, 2022)	5	"Beautiful Days" – Kyla	EJ Ballebar	Eliminated
Episode 14 (August 7, 2022)	5	"Beautiful Days" – Kyla	Drei Sugay	Advanced
Episode 14 (August 7, 2022)	5	"Beautiful Days" – Kyla	Jerold Tamayo	Eliminated
Episode 14 (August 7, 2022)	5	"Beautiful Days" – Kyla	Bryan Chong	Advanced
Episode 14 (August 7, 2022)	5	"Beautiful Days" – Kyla	Brio Divinagracia	Eliminated
Episode 14 (August 7, 2022)	5	"Beautiful Days" – Kyla	Anthony Meneses	Advanced
Episode 14 (August 7, 2022)	6	"Diamante" – Morissette	Chloe Redondo	Eliminated
Episode 14 (August 7, 2022)	6	"Diamante" – Morissette	Steph Samson	Eliminated
Episode 14 (August 7, 2022)	6	"Diamante" – Morissette	Ranella Katrice Robles	Eliminated
Episode 14 (August 7, 2022)	6	"Diamante" – Morissette	Gyla Casero	Eliminated
Episode 14 (August 7, 2022)	6	"Diamante" – Morissette	Misha De Leon	Advanced
Episode 14 (August 7, 2022)	7	"If I Believe" – Patti Austin	Alnie Caparoso	Eliminated
Episode 14 (August 7, 2022)	7	"If I Believe" – Patti Austin	Kice	Advanced
Episode 14 (August 7, 2022)	7	"If I Believe" – Patti Austin	Jaime Kliatchko	Eliminated
Episode 14 (August 7, 2022)	7	"If I Believe" – Patti Austin	Mikko Estrada	Eliminated
Episode 14 (August 7, 2022)	7	"If I Believe" – Patti Austin	Max Macaraig	Eliminated
Episode 14 (August 7, 2022)	7	"If I Believe" – Patti Austin	Paul Macalindong	Eliminated
Episode 14 (August 7, 2022)	8	"Signed, Sealed, Delivered" – Stevie Wonder	Brei Binuya	Eliminated
Episode 14 (August 7, 2022)	8	"Signed, Sealed, Delivered" – Stevie Wonder	Jarea Ifurung	Advanced
Episode 14 (August 7, 2022)	8	"Signed, Sealed, Delivered" – Stevie Wonder	Nisha Bedaña	Advanced
Episode 14 (August 7, 2022)	8	"Signed, Sealed, Delivered" – Stevie Wonder	Trisha Gomez	Advanced
Episode 14 (August 7, 2022)	8	"Signed, Sealed, Delivered" – Stevie Wonder	Beverlyn Silva	Eliminated

=== Solo round (Top 20) ===
The remaining twenty contestants, including the four platinum ticket holders, performed individually with a song of their choice. This round aired on August 13 and 14, 2022. The judges selected twelve contestants to advance to the next round, with three of the four platinum ticket holders being eliminated.

Results of the Solo round
Episode	Order	Contestant	Song	Result
Episode 15 (August 13, 2022)	1	Drei Sugay	"Ikaw Lang" – Nobita	Advanced
Episode 15 (August 13, 2022)	2	Isaac Zamudio	"Lason Mong Halik" – Katrina Velarde	Eliminated
Episode 15 (August 13, 2022)	3	Darius Miguel	"Tuloy Pa Rin" – Neocolours	Eliminated
Episode 15 (August 13, 2022)	4	Dominic Hatol	"Saan Darating Ang Umaga" – Raymond Lauchengco	Eliminated
Episode 15 (August 13, 2022)	5	Anthony Meneses	"Tadhana" – UDD	Advanced
Episode 15 (August 13, 2022)	6	Khimo Gumatay	"Tala" – Sarah Geronimo	Advanced
Episode 15 (August 13, 2022)	7	Chester Padilla	"Leaves" – Ben&Ben	Eliminated
Episode 15 (August 13, 2022)	8	Kice	"Isn't She Lovely" – Stevie Wonder	Advanced
Episode 15 (August 13, 2022)	9	PJ Fabia	"Habang Atin Ang Gabi" – South Border	Advanced
Episode 15 (August 13, 2022)	10	Bryan Chong	"Ulap" – Rob Daniel	Advanced
Episode 16 (August 14, 2022)	1	Delly Cuales	"Basang Sisiw" – Juana Cosme	Advanced
Episode 16 (August 14, 2022)	2	Jarea Ifurung	"Mahal Kong Pilipinas" – JMARA	Eliminated
Episode 16 (August 14, 2022)	3	Kimberly Baculo	"Believer" – Imagine Dragons	Eliminated
Episode 16 (August 14, 2022)	4	Esay Belanio	"Sabi Nila" – Agaw Agimat	Eliminated
Episode 16 (August 14, 2022)	5	Trisha Gomez	"Oo" – UDD	Advanced
Episode 16 (August 14, 2022)	6	Ann Raniel	"Ikot-Ikot" – Sarah Geronimo	Advanced
Episode 16 (August 14, 2022)	7	Jean Flores	"Nasa Puso" – Janine Berdin	Eliminated
Episode 16 (August 14, 2022)	8	Misha De Leon	"Sign of the Times" – Harry Styles	Advanced
Episode 16 (August 14, 2022)	9	Ryssi Avila	"Nakapagtataka" – Sponge Cola	Advanced
Episode 16 (August 14, 2022)	10	Nisha Bedaña	"And I Am Telling You I'm Not Going" – Jennifer Hudson	Advanced

== Live gala ==
The Top 12 performed live on air each week. At the end of the performances, viewers could vote for their favorite contestant. For this season, voting was only allowed via UpLive. In a unique mechanism for Idol Philippines, the judges determined half of each contestant's overall score. The contestant with the highest tally for each component received a score of 50% for that component, with the remaining contestants' scores being proportional to the highest vote-getter's tally. These component scores were then combined to form the contestant's final score. At the end of each week, one or two contestants were eliminated following the reveal of the bottom three or bottom two.

Contestant was saved by the public and judges' votes
Contestant was saved by the public and judges' votes but received one of the lowest scores
Contestant was eliminated

=== Week 1: Top 12 – Hugot ===
The theme for the week was "hugot," so the Top 12 performed ballads. The contestants were mentored by former ASAP Sessionistas members Nina and Ice Seguerra. Moira Dela Torre was absent from the episode due to testing positive for COVID-19.

Top 12 results
Episode	Order	Contestant	Song	Score	Result
Episode 17 (August 20, 2022)	1	Nisha Bedaña	"Hiling" – Mark Carpio	76.03%	Safe
Episode 17 (August 20, 2022)	2	Khimo Gumatay	"One Last Cry" – Brian McKnight	74.78%	Safe
Episode 17 (August 20, 2022)	3	Drei Sugay	"Sa 'Yo" – Silent Sanctuary	70.20%	Eliminated
Episode 17 (August 20, 2022)	4	Ann Raniel	"Till My Heartaches End" – Ella May Saison	94.50%	Safe
Episode 17 (August 20, 2022)	5	Trisha Gomez	"Falling" – Harry Styles	88.16%	Safe
Episode 17 (August 20, 2022)	6	Anthony Meneses	"Pagsamo" – Arthur Nery	68.23%	Eliminated
Episode 17 (August 20, 2022)	7	Kice	"Barely Breathing" – Duncan Sheik	73.11%	Bottom three
Episode 17 (August 20, 2022)	8	Delly Cuales	"Ibong Ligaw" – Juana Cosme	75.97%	Safe
Episode 18 (August 21, 2022)	1	Bryan Chong	"Paubaya" – Moira Dela Torre	82.28%	Safe
Episode 18 (August 21, 2022)	2	Misha De Leon	"Para Lang Sa 'Yo" – Ice Seguerra	75.08%	Safe
Episode 18 (August 21, 2022)	3	PJ Fabia	"Kabilang Buhay" – Bandang Lapis	96.33%	Safe
Episode 18 (August 21, 2022)	4	Ryssi Avila	"Oks Lang" – J Roa	82.35%	Safe

=== Week 2: Top 10 – Songs of Ogie Alcasid ===
This week, the Top 10 performed songs sung or written by Ogie Alcasid, who also served as their mentor. Moira Dela Torre returned after recovering from COVID-19, which caused her to miss the previous week’s episodes.

Top 10 results
Episode	Order	Contestant	Song	Score	Result
Episode 19 (August 27, 2022)	1	PJ Fabia	"If Only" – Sarah Geronimo	84.81%	Safe
Episode 19 (August 27, 2022)	2	Delly Cuales	"Kung Mawawala Ka" – Ogie Alcasid	77.54%	Safe
Episode 19 (August 27, 2022)	3	Misha De Leon	"I Will Be There" – Ogie Alcasid	72.91%	Eliminated
Episode 19 (August 27, 2022)	4	Kice	"Ikaw Sana" – Ogie Alcasid	77.44%	Bottom three
Episode 19 (August 27, 2022)	5	Ryssi Avila	"Huwag Ka Lang Mawawala" – Ogie Alcasid	83.41%	Safe
Episode 19 (August 27, 2022)	6	Bryan Chong	"Akala Ko" – Ogie Alcasid	92.94%	Safe
Episode 20 (August 28, 2022)	1	Khimo Gumatay	"Kailangan Kita" – Ogie Alcasid	82.10%	Safe
Episode 20 (August 28, 2022)	2	Trisha Gomez	"Ikaw Lamang" – Ogie Alcasid	79.07%	Safe
Episode 20 (August 28, 2022)	3	Nisha Bedaña	"Ikaw Ang Aking Pangarap" – Ogie Alcasid	77.03%	Eliminated
Episode 20 (August 28, 2022)	4	Ann Raniel	"Sa Piling Mo" – Ogie Alcasid	87.38%	Safe

Non-competition performances
Order	Performer	Song
20.1	Iñigo Pascual	"Danger"

=== Week 3: Top 8 – Teleserye and Movie Theme Songs ===
The Top 8 performed theme songs from Philippine television drama series and movies. This week featured Angeline Quinto as the guest mentor.

Top 8 results
Episode	Order	Contestant	Song	From	Score	Result
Episode 21 (September 3, 2022)	1	Delly Cuales	"Ang Sa Iyo Ay Akin" – Aegis	Ang sa Iyo Ay Akin	85.99%	Bottom four
Episode 21 (September 3, 2022)	2	PJ Fabia	"Sana'y Maghintay Ang Walang Hanggan" – Zsa Zsa Padilla	Kay Tagal Kang Hinintay/Luna Blanca	65.00%	Eliminated
Episode 21 (September 3, 2022)	3	Kice	"And I Love You So" – Don McLean	And I Love You So	100.00%	Safe
Episode 21 (September 3, 2022)	4	Trisha Gomez	"How Did You Know" – Gary Valenciano	All My Life/Ikaw Lang ang Iibigin	57.67%	Eliminated
Episode 21 (September 3, 2022)	5	Khimo Gumatay	"Hataw Na" – Gary Valenciano	Hataw Na	83.48%	Bottom four
Episode 22 (September 4, 2022)	1	Ann Raniel	"Mangarap Ka" – AfterImage	Mangarap Ka	93.09%	Safe
Episode 22 (September 4, 2022)	2	Ryssi Avila	"Rainbow" – South Border	Crying Ladies	89.22%	Safe
Episode 22 (September 4, 2022)	3	Bryan Chong	"Hindi Kita Iiwan" – Sam Milby	He's Into Her	92.30%	Safe

Non-competition performances
Order	Performers	Song
21.1	Idol Top 8 (Ann Raniel, Bryan Chong, Delly Cuales, Khimo Gumatay, Kice, PJ Fabia, Ryssi Avila, and Trisha Gomez)	"Summer Nights"/"You're the One That I Want"
22.1	Darren Espanto	"Tama Na"

=== Week 4: Top 6 – Showstoppers ===
The Top 6 hopefuls performed "showstopping" songs of their choice. The contestants were mentored by musical directors Louie Ocampo and Ria Osorio.

Top 6 results
Episode	Order	Contestant	Song	Score	Result
Episode 23 (September 10, 2022)	1	Ryssi Avila	"Kilometro" – Sarah Geronimo	99.02%	Safe
Episode 23 (September 10, 2022)	2	Kice	"Basket Case" – Green Day	79.44%	Bottom three
Episode 23 (September 10, 2022)	3	Bryan Chong	"Mundo" – IV of Spades	94.41%	Bottom three
Episode 23 (September 10, 2022)	4	Ann Raniel	"One Night Only" – Jennifer Hudson	97.19%	Safe
Episode 24 (September 11, 2022)	1	Delly Cuales	"Proud Mary" – Tina Turner	64.59%	Eliminated
Episode 24 (September 11, 2022)	2	Khimo Gumatay	"End of the Road" – Boyz II Men	96.13%	Safe

Non-competition performance
Order	Performers	Song
24.1	Gary Valenciano	"Look in Her Eyes"

=== Week 5: The Final Showdown (September 17 & 18) ===
==== Part 1 – Top 5 (September 17) ====
The Top 5 finalists performed live on September 17, 2022. Two contestants were eliminated that night, leaving the remaining three finalists to compete the following night.

Top 5 results
Episode	Order	Contestant	Song	Score	Result
Episode 25 (September 17, 2022)	1	Bryan Chong	"Bawat Daan" – Ebe Dancel	70.24%	Eliminated
Episode 25 (September 17, 2022)	2	Khimo Gumatay	"You're Still the One" – Shania Twain	85.66%	Safe
Episode 25 (September 17, 2022)	3	Ann Raniel	"Paano" – Dulce	63.70%	Eliminated
Episode 25 (September 17, 2022)	4	Ryssi Avila	"Nadarang" – Shanti Dope	76.19%	Bottom three
Episode 25 (September 17, 2022)	5	Kice	"Di Na Muli" – Itchyworms	92.63%	Safe

Non-competition performances
Order	Performers	Song
25.1	Regine Velasquez, Ann Raniel, Delly Cuales, and Nisha Bedaña	"Dadalhin"
25.2	Moira Dela Torre, Ryssi Avila, Trisha Gomez, and Misha de Leon	"Kumpas"
25.3	Chito Miranda, Kice, Drei Sugay, and Anthony Meneses	"Harana"
25.4	Gary Valenciano, Bryan Chong, Khimo Gumatay, and PJ Fabia	"Di Bale Na Lang"
25.5	Idol Judges and the Top 12	"Di Bale Na Lang"

==== Part 2 – Top 3 (September 18) ====
The Top 3 performed live on September 18, 2022. Each contestant performed two songs: a song of their choosing that reflected their journey throughout the competition, and an original song written for them.

Voting for the winner opened after all six performances and closed shortly thereafter. Khimo Gumatay was named the winner, with Ryssi Avila and Kice finishing in second and third, respectively. The scores were revealed at the end of the episode.

Top 3 results
Episode	Contestant	Round 1		Round 2			Score	Result
Episode	Contestant	Order	Song	Order	Song	Composer	Score	Result
Episode 26 (September 18, 2022)	Ryssi Avila	1	"Lilim (In Your Shelter)" – Victory Worship	4	"Totoo Na 'To"	Rox Santos	49.38%	Runner-up
Episode 26 (September 18, 2022)	Kice	2	"Your Love" – Alamid	5	"Angels"	Jon Guelas	45.77%	Third place
Episode 26 (September 18, 2022)	Khimo Gumatay	3	"Bagong Simula" – Jem Macatuno	6	"My Time"	Jeremy Glinoga	89.00%	Winner

Non-competition performances
Order	Performer	Song
26.1	Vice Ganda	"Pearly Shells"
26.2	Khimo Gumatay	"My Time" (reprised as winner)

== Elimination chart ==
Color key

Female contestant
Male contestant
Winner
Runner-up
Did not perform
Not Chosen
Saved by Judges
Safe
Highest Score
Bottom Group
Eliminated

Results per round
Place	Contestant	Top 20		Top 12	Top 10	Top 8	Top 6	Finale	
Place	Contestant	Top 20		Top 12	Top 10	Top 8	Top 6	Top 5	Top 3
Place	Contestant	8/13	8/14	8/21	8/28	9/4	9/11	9/17	9/18
1	Khimo Gumatay	Safe	N/A	9th 74.78%	5th 82.10%	6th 83.48%	3rd 96.13%	2nd 85.66%	Winner; 89.00%
2	Ryssi Avila	N/A	Safe	4th 82.35%	4th 83.41%	4th 89.22%	1st 99.02%	3rd 76.19%	Runner-up; 49.38%
3	Kice	Safe	N/A	10th 73.11%	8th 77.44%	1st 100%	5th 79.44%	1st 92.63%	3rd 45.77%
4	Bryan Chong	Safe	N/A	5th 82.28%	1st 92.94%	3rd 92.30%	4th 94.41%	4th 70.24%	
5	Ann Raniel	N/A	Safe	2nd 94.50%	2nd 87.38%	2nd 93.09%	2nd 97.19%	5th 63.70%	
6	Delly Cuales	N/A	Safe	7th 75.97%	7th 77.54%	5th 85.99%	6th 64.59%		
7	PJ Fabia	Safe	N/A	1st 96.33%	3rd 84.81%	7th 65.00%			
8	Trisha Gomez	N/A	Safe	3rd 88.16%	6th 79.07%	8th 57.67%			
9	Nisha Bedaña	N/A	Safe	6th 76.03%	9th 77.03%				
10	Misha de Leon	N/A	Safe	8th 75.08%	10th 72.91%				
11	Drei Sugay	Safe	N/A	11th 70.20%					
12	Anthony Meneses	Safe	N/A	12th 68.23%					
13–20	Esay Belanio	N/A	Eliminated						
13–20	Jarea Ifurung	N/A	Eliminated						
13–20	Jean Flores	N/A	Eliminated						
13–20	Kimberly Baculo	N/A	Eliminated						
13–20	Chester Padilla	Eliminated							
13–20	Darius Miguel	Eliminated							
13–20	Dominic Hatol	Eliminated							
13–20	Isaac Zamudio	Eliminated							

== Accolades ==
Year	Award	Category	Result	Ref.
2022	2nd Diamond Excellence Awards	Outstanding Music Reality Show of the Year	Won	
