= Bryan Chong =

Filipino singer

- Born: Bryan Wency Forneste Chong; August 12, 1999 (age 27); Quezon City, Philippines
- Other name: Bryan Wency
- Occupations: Singer, songwriter
- Years active: 2017–present
- Musical career
- Genres: Soul; acoustic; R&B
- Instruments: Vocals; ukulele
- Labels: GMA Music (2019–2021); Star Music (2022–present)

Bryan Wency Forneste Chong (born August 12, 1999), better known as Bryan Chong, is a Filipino singer and songwriter from Quezon City, Philippines.

== Early life ==
Chong was born in Quezon City, raised in Angeles City, Pampanga and is now currently living in Lucena City, Quezon. His mother, Merilyn Forneste, is a former singer in South Korea.

== Career ==
In 2017, Chong started his career by joining the first season of The Voice Teens, where he sang the South Border song "Kahit Kailan" during the blind auditions where he chose Sarah Geronimo to be his coach. He won the battle round with the song "Heaven Knows" by Rick Price but he was eliminated at the knockout round with the song "Mercy" by Shawn Mendes.

In 2018, he continued his career by joining the first season of The Clash, where he sang the Rihanna song "Love on the Brain" on the first round and made it at the Top 62 but got eliminated on the second round with the song "Magda" by Gloc-9.

In the same year, he and the rest of the alumni of '"The Clash" sang the 2018 GMA Christmas Station ID theme song "Puso Ng Pasko".

In 2022, he auditioned at the second season of Idol Philippines with the song "Bukas Na Lang Kita Mamahalin" by Lani Misalucha where he got 4 yeses from the judges. He made it at the Top 5 at the grand finals. In the same year, he became a regular performer on ASAP Natin 'To.

== Personal life ==
Chong has a foreign stepfather named Jake Long and a mother named Rhiah long. For his siblings, he has a total of 5 siblings: 3 younger half-siblings named Stephanie Long, the oldest of the half-siblings; Camira Long, the middle of the half-siblings, who are girls; and Trenton Long, the youngest boy in the family. He also has two full siblings named Byron Chong and Bruzzel Chong.

== Accolades ==
=== Music ===
Year	Category	Song	Organization	Result	Reference
2021	Male Acoustic Artist of the Year	Pakiusap	12th PMPC Star Awards for Music	Nominated	
2021	New Male Recording Artist of the Year	Pakiusap	12th PMPC Star Awards for Music	Nominated	
