= Idol Philippines =

- Also known as: Search for the Idol Philippines
- Genre: Reality competition
- Created by: Simon Fuller
- Based on: Pop Idol
- Directed by: Bobet Vidanes (2019); Joane Laygo (2022)
- Presented by: Billy Crawford (Season 1); Robi Domingo (Season 2)
- Judges: Moira Dela Torre; James Reid; Regine Velasquez; Vice Ganda; Chito Miranda; Gary Valenciano
- Theme music composer: Julian Gingell; Barry Stone; Cathy Dennis
- Country of origin: Philippines
- Original language: Filipino
- No. of seasons: 2
- No. of episodes: 30

Production
- Executive producers: Paeancyd Pearl B. Sabangan; Allan Sunga; Carlo L. Katigbak; Cory V. Vidanes; Laurenti M. Dyogi; Luis L. Andrada; Albee Benitez
- Producer: Olivia M. Zarate
- Production locations: ABS-CBN Soundstage San Jose Del Monte, Bulacan (Auditions/Idol City/Semi Finals); Newport Performing Arts Theater, Resorts World Manila (The Final Showdown); ABS-CBN Broadcasting Center Sgt. Esguerra Avenue, Diliman, Quezon City (Auditions/Idol City/Semi Finals/The Final Showdown)
- Camera setup: Multiple-camera setup
- Running time: 60–90 minutes
- Production companies: ABS-CBN Studios; Fremantle; 19 Entertainment; Brightlight Productions

Original release
- Network: ABS-CBN
- Release: April 21 – July 28, 2019
- Network: Kapamilya Channel
- Release: June 25 – September 18, 2022

Related
- Philippine Idol (2006); Pinoy Idol (2008); Idol Kids Philippines; American Idol

Idol Philippines (known as Search for the Idol Philippines in the first season or better known as Philippine Idol) is a Philippine television interactive reality competition show broadcast by ABS-CBN and Kapamilya Channel. Created and developed by FremantleMedia and 19 Entertainment, the program is a franchise of Pop Idol created by British entertainment executive Simon Fuller, the show is the third and final incarnation of Philippine Idol. Originally hosted by Billy Crawford and originally judges by Regine Velasquez, Vice Ganda, James Reid and Moira Dela Torre, it aired on the network's Yes Weekend line up from April 21, 2019 to September 18, 2022, replacing World of Dance Philippines and was replaced by Everybody, Sing!. Robi Domingo serves as the latest host and Velasquez, Dela Torre, Gary Valenciano and Chito Miranda serve as the latest judges.

== History ==
=== Previous Iterations ===
The Idol franchise first made its appearance on Philippine television in 2006 in the form of Philippine Idol on ABC 5. Early reviews of the show implied a positive run for the show. The pilot drew in overwhelming ratings and good reviews from entertainment critics from its "promising" start. Despite this, the show incurred losses from lower than expected advertising revenue, culminating in the cancellation of an expected second season.

The franchise then moved to GMA Network, in which it was branded as Pinoy Idol. Although critics expected that the lapses that occurred in Philippine Idol would be remedied in Pinoy Idol, once the show went on air, these expectations would be dampened following its premiere. The show would ultimately fail to be renewed for a second season, being replaced by an original singing competition, Are You the Next Big Star?.

=== ABS-CBN Era ===
On October 17, 2018, it was announced that ABS-CBN will broadcast the third iteration of the Idol franchise in the Philippines after it had sealed a franchise deal with Fremantle and 19 Entertainment, the co-owners of the format. At the finale of the first season, host Billy Crawford confirmed the production of a future season of the show.

The fate of the show was left uncertain on May 5, 2020, when the National Telecommunications Commission issued a cease and desist order on ABS-CBN, effectively ceasing free-to-air broadcasting operations on the network. Its aftermath, including the denial of the franchise and layoffs saw the transfer of its host, Billy Crawford and its director, Bobet Vidanes to blocktimer shows.

Production on the second season was then confirmed on April 25, 2022. The second season would be jointly produced by ABS-CBN Entertainment and Brightlight Productions and is set to air on Kapamilya Channel, A2Z and TV5, marking the third iteration's first broadcast outside ABS-CBN. The second season premiered on June 25 and 26, 2022.

== Judges and hosts ==
=== Judges ===
Judges and host of the most recent season of Idol Philippines

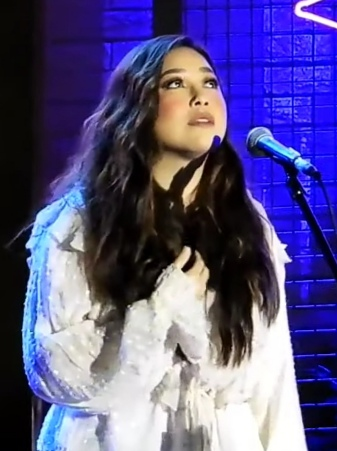
Moira Dela Torre

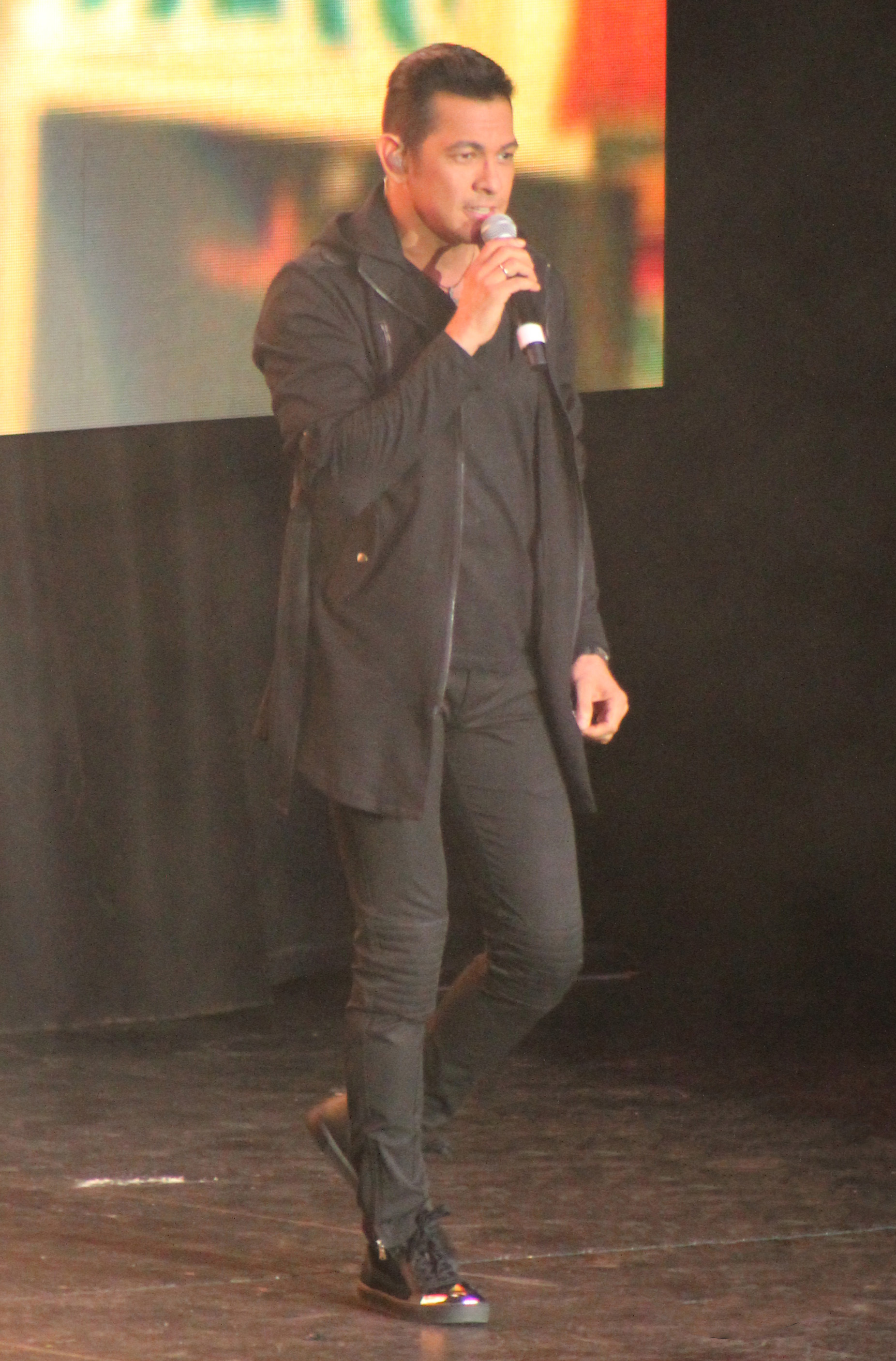
Gary Valenciano

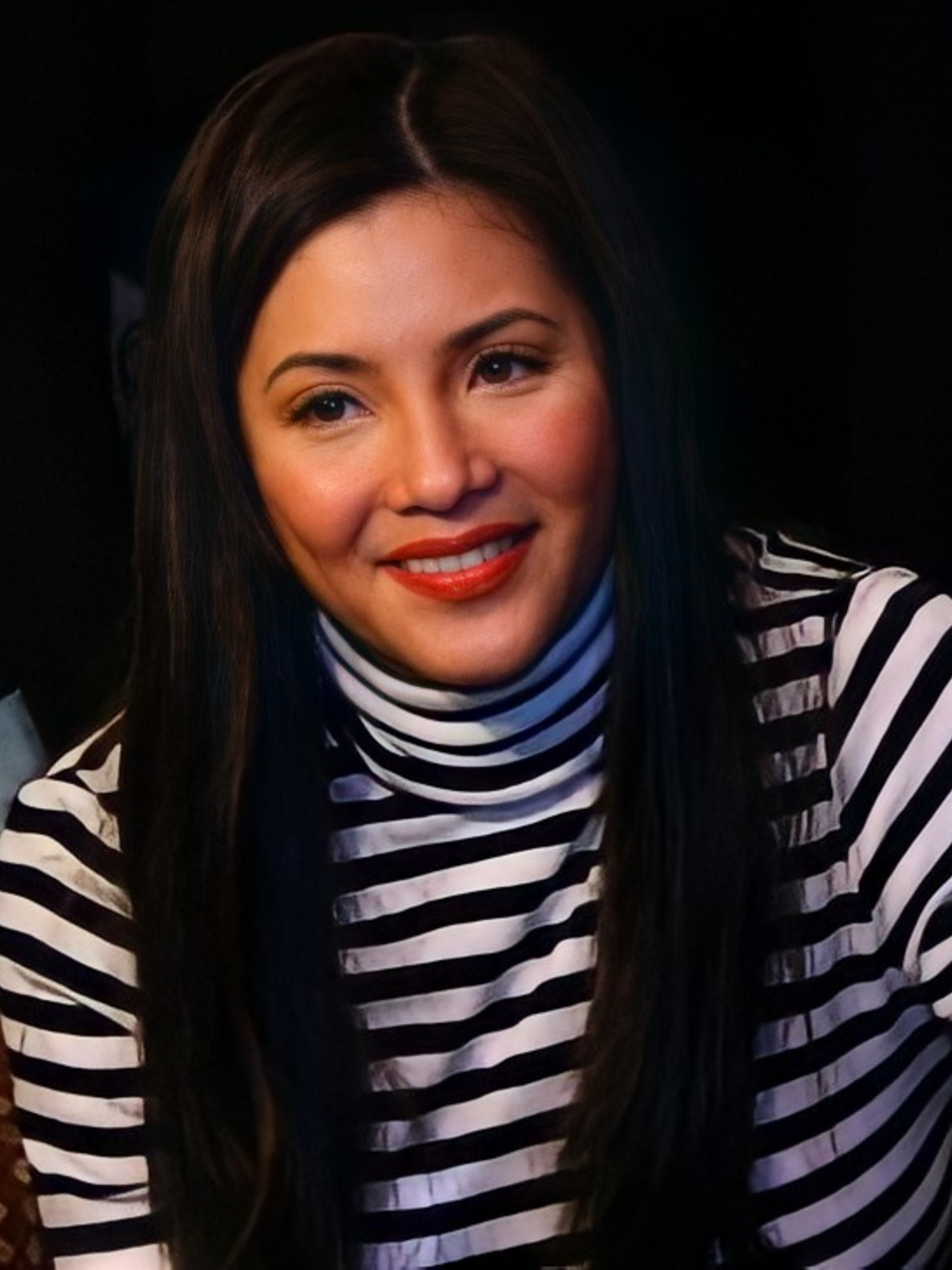
Regine Velasquez

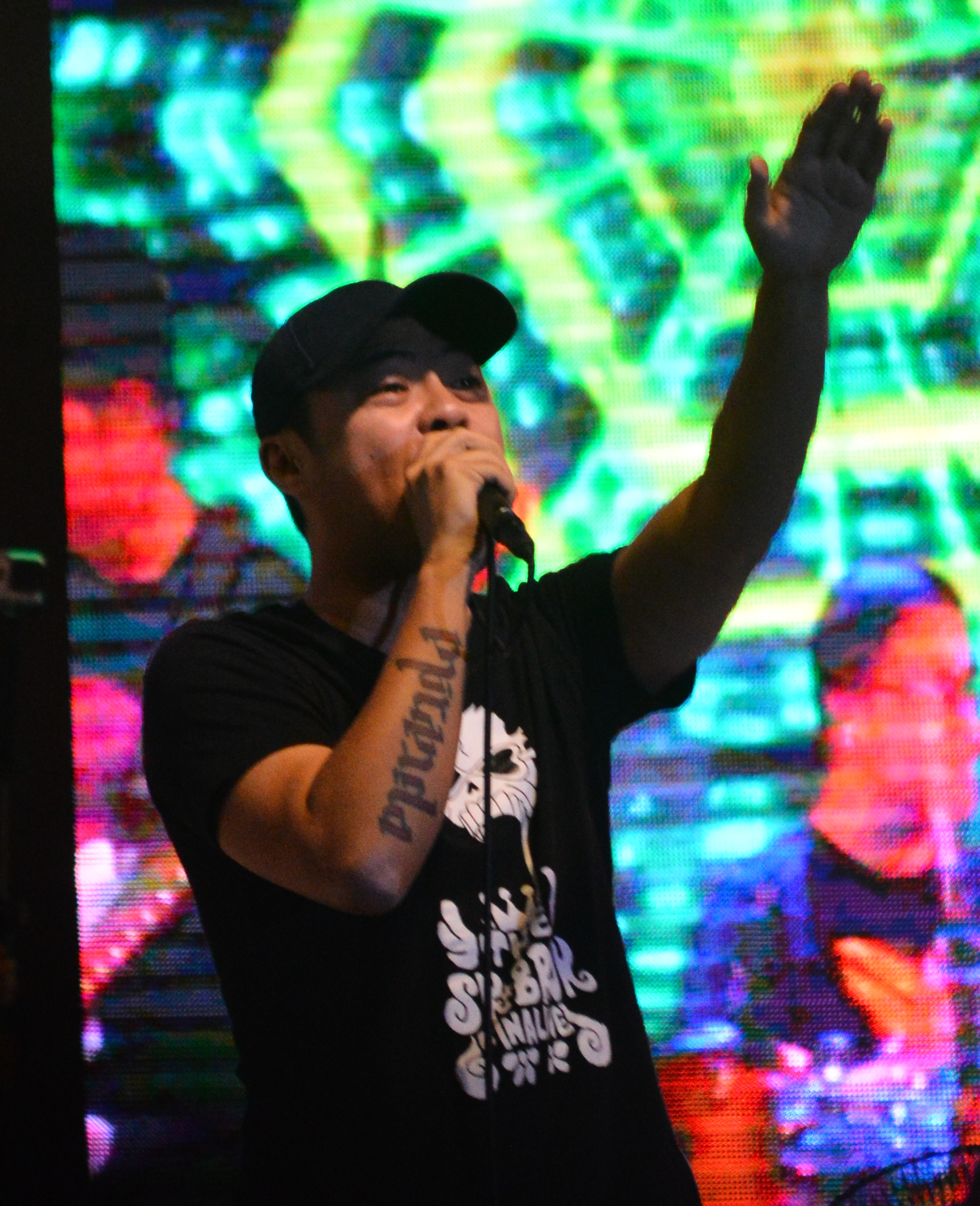
Chito Miranda

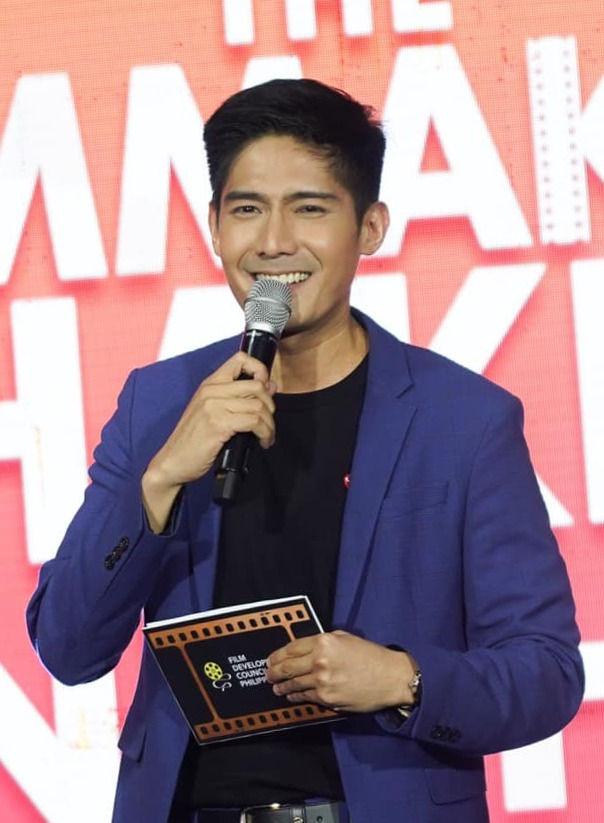
Robi Domingo

Idol Philippines Judges
Judge	Seasons	
Judge	1	2
Regine Velasquez		
Moira Dela Torre		
Vice Ganda		
James Reid		
Chito Miranda		
Gary Valenciano		

Legend
Featured as a Judge.
Featured as a Guest Mentor.

In October 2018, Regine Velasquez was revealed to be the first judge after signing her exclusive contract with ABS-CBN. This was her first stint as a judge in a televised singing competition. Following this announcement, there were rumors that Jessica Sanchez, the runner-up of the eleventh season of American Idol, will be added as a judge but it has been denied by her. Speculations also circulated that David Archuleta, the runner-up of the seventh season of American Idol, was also considered to become a judge for the show, but the rumors were downplayed by him saying that he was not invited by the network's management.

On February 26, 2019, Philippine Entertainment Portal unofficially revealed that James Reid, Vice Ganda and Moira Dela Torre will join Velasquez as the show's judging panel. According to the website, a reliable source sent them a photo of the four judges standing behind a judges' table similar to those of the other Idol franchises. The three remaining judges' were later confirmed on the same day, after they were officially introduced on TV Patrol, ABS-CBN's primetime newscast. Among the four judges, Vice Ganda is an experienced judge—having been a judge for It's Showtime besides being a host, Pinoy Boyband Superstar, and two seasons of Pilipinas Got Talent. It was revealed in an interview that Vice Ganda was the only judge handpicked by Fremantle.

The second season saw a change in the show's roster of judges. On May 20, 2022, it was announced that James Reid and Vice Ganda both exited the judging panel, with Parokya ni Edgar's vocalist Chito Miranda and Gary Valenciano being named as their replacements. Both Velasquez and Dela Torre returned for the second season. Miranda later revealed that he was previously asked to be a judge for the first season, although he declined. Comedian Ogie Diaz later revealed that Vice Ganda backed out of the show after receiving word that Sarah Geronimo, who was initially slated to be a judge for the show backed out due to her personal reasons. James Reid exited the panel as he was living abroad at the time of the season.

=== Hosts ===
Idol Philippines Host
Host	Seasons	
Host	1	2
Billy Crawford		
Robi Domingo		

Legend
Featured as a Host.

The first season was presented by Billy Crawford as part of his renewed contract deal with ABS-CBN. Crawford would ultimately not return in subsequent seasons following the shutdown of ABS-CBN in 2020, leading to his transfer to Viva Entertainment-produced blocktimers that are aired on TV5. TV5 is the first franchise holder in the Philippines when it aired "Philippine Idol" back in 2006.

On May 22, 2022, during a launch party on ASAP Natin 'To, it was announced that Robi Domingo would be the host for the second season.

== Companion online shows ==
For the first season, an online show, called Idol on the Road, airs together with the main program on Idol Philippines' Facebook and YouTube accounts; it is hosted by BoybandPH and comedian Jervi Li, commonly known as KaladKaren Davila. The said show airs live from the Idol Philippines Bus.

For the second season, an online show titled The Next Idol PH airs on Idol Philippines' UpLive account and on Kapamilya Online Live during commercial breaks. Hosted by the show's former contestants, the show airs live from the hosts' places.

== Format ==
=== Auditions ===
Before each season, the show holds open auditions in key cities throughout the Philippines. These auditions are usually not aired on the show, although the process is documented in several points during the season. The auditions are open for Filipinos aged 16 to 28 years old.

For season 2, which was taped amid the COVID-19 pandemic, all auditions were held online, with no onsite auditions being held.

Successful auditionees will get to perform for the show's panel of judges, which would be the only audition stage shown on television. A contestant would need three "yes" votes from the judges in order to advance and receive a golden ticket to the Theatre Rounds.

=== Middle rounds ===
Known as the Theater rounds in season 1, the competition moves to a studio stage following the conclusion of the auditions. Those who earned a golden ticket in the auditions will compete in a series of competitions.

In the first round, the contestants are grouped into groups of four or five based on their genre and voice quality. Each group will select and perform one song that plays to their collective strengths. At the end of each performance, the judges will choose an undetermined amount of contestants to move on to the next round. In the next round, the contestants are grouped of gendered groups of six. In this round, the judges will select the songs for the groups to sing, with each song being handpicked to be a challenge for each group. At the end of each performance, the judges will choose an undetermined amount of contestants to move on to the next round. In the final round of the Theater Rounds, the remaining contestants will perform individually with a song of their choice. At the end of the round, twelve contestants will advance to the Live Shows.

=== Live shows ===
Each week, the remaining contestants will perform each week live on television. Each week has a particular theme, with a guest mentor usually related to the theme coming in to advise the contestants. At the end of the performances, viewers may vote for a contestant of their choice. They may either vote via SMS or Google. In a mechanic unique to Idol Philippines, the judges will determine half of the contestants' overall scores. The contestant with the highest tally per component will receive a score of 50% from that component, with the rest of the contestants' score being proportionate of the tally of the highest vote-getter. The components are then combined to form the contestant's final score. At the end of each week, two to one contestants are eliminated following the reveal of a bottom three or bottom two.

=== Finals ===
The finale takes place on two nights. In the first night, two contestants are eliminated. In the second night, the placements of the remaining contestants are revealed, with a winner being crowned. The winner will win ₱2,000,000 and an exclusive recording contract from Star Music, among other prizes.

== Series overview ==
Season	Premiere	Finale	No. of contestants	No. of episodes	Winner	Runner-up	Third Place	Judges				Refs.
1	April 21, 2019	July 28, 2019	69	29	Zephanie Dimaranan	Lucas Garcia	Lance Busa	Moira Dela Torre	Regine Velasquez	Vice Ganda	James Reid	
2	June 25, 2022	September 18, 2022	72	26	Khimo Gumatay	Ryssi Avila	Kice	Moira Dela Torre	Gary Valenciano	Regine Velasquez	Chito Miranda	

== Reception ==
=== Television ratings ===
Television ratings for Idol Philippines are gathered from Kantar Media. Kantar Media's survey ratings are gathered from all over the Philippines' urban and rural households.

Season	Number of episodes	Premiere	Rating	Rank	Finale	Rating (Saturday)	Rank	Rating (Sunday)	Rank	Media	Ref.
1	29	April 21, 2019	30.6%	#1	July 28, 2019	31.4%	#1	34.2%	#1	Kantar Media	

=== Critical response ===
The televised auditions for the first season was met with mixed public reception. Netizens criticized Dela Torre and Reid's lack of credibility as judges, although Reid was praised for his frankness. The show was compared in a negative light to other singing competitions, including The Voice of The Philippines, specially following the aftermath of the rejection of reggae artist Luke Baylon, in which only one judge, Velasquez voted to advance Baylon into the next round. Amid the criticism, Velasquez defended her fellow judges in an interview with reporters during the 35th PMPC Awards for movies, stating that "the three were chosen to be at the judging table because of their individual expertise".

== See also ==
- Idol Philippines season 1
- Idol Philippines season 2
