= Lance Busa =

Filipino singer and actor

- Born: Lance Tupaz Busa; December 16, 1994 (age 31); Butuan, Agusan del Norte, Philippines
- Other names: Lance
- Occupations: Singer, actor
- Years active: 2015–present
- Awards: To the Top (Top 12); Bolt of Talent (Winner); Idol Philippines (3rd place)

Lance Tupaz Busa (born December 16, 1994), better known as Lance Busa, is a Filipino singer and occasional actor. He placed third in Idol Philippines in 2019 and was the grand winner of the first edition of Michael Bolton's singing competition Bolt of Talent in 2017.

== Early life and education ==
Busa was born on December 16, 1994, in Butuan, Agusan del Norte, Philippines. He is one of the six children of Lorenzo Busa and Liza Tupaz.

As a child, Busa grew up in a household filled with jazz and soul music and began singing at 5 during family gatherings, though his parents discouraged him from pursuing music as a career.

In 2011, Busa obtained his bachelor's degree in hotel, restaurant and institutional management at De La Salle - College of Saint Benilde.

== Career ==
In 2015, Busa joined To the Top, GMA Network's talent search for their newest boy band, where he made it to the grand finals. He received another opportunity with the company and had an acting contract with them for two years that did not include singing; he felt as if he were "left in the dark." Sometime after the competition, comedian Arnell Ignacio discovered one of Busa's karaoke videos on Facebook and began mentoring him at a time that he had become discouraged with the loss and without support from his parents.

In 2016, Busa played the role of Mocha, a guest character in GMA Network's TV series entitled Sa Piling ni Nanay starring Mark Herras, Katrina Halili and Yasmien Kurdi.

Busa's story of early discouragement and mentorship resurfaced when he auditioned for an international singing competition entitled Bolt of Talent in 2017, catching Michael Bolton's attention with its similarity to his own story. Busa went on to win as the grand champion in the finale held in Malaysia.

In 2019, Busa auditioned for Idol Philippines (the third incarnation of Philippine franchise of Idol) on ABS-CBN, where he sang "What You Won't Do For Love" by Bobby Caldwell. He finished as one of the top 3 finalists in the first season.
