= I Can See Your Voice (Philippine game show) season 2 =

Television game show season

I Can See Your Voice
- Season 2
- Starring: Bayani Agbayani; Jobert Austria; Wacky Kiray; Kean Cipriano; Alex Gonzaga; Andrew E.; Angeline Quinto; KaladKaren
- Hosted by: Luis Manzano
- Winners: Good singers: 19; Bad singers: 13
- No. of episodes: Regular: 30; Special: 2; Overall: 32

Release
- Original network: ABS-CBN
- Original release: August 10, 2019 – March 14, 2020

Season chronology
- ← Previous; Season 1 Next → Season 3 (on Kapamilya Channel and A2Z)

The second season of the Philippine television mystery music game show I Can See Your Voice premiered on ABS-CBN on August 10, 2019.

This season also featured the first games with an entire lineup of elderly (played by Doris Bigornia) and foreigners (played by Ethel Booba) as mystery singers.

Due to halting of production amidst the COVID-19 pandemic, as well as the second shutdown of broadcasting on May 5, 2020, this prematurely ended season was the last to be aired on ABS-CBN.

== Gameplay ==
=== Format ===
According to the original South Korean rules, the guest artist(s) must attempt to eliminate bad singers during its game phase. At the final performance, the last remaining mystery singer is revealed as either good or bad by means of a duet between them and one of the guest artists.

At the end of each round, an eliminated mystery singer gets a consolation prize starting from ₱5,000 (for the first round), ₱10,000 (for the second round), to ₱15,000 (for the third round). If the last remaining mystery singer is good, the guest artist(s) receive an Eye-ward trophy. The winning mystery singer, regardless of being good (SEE-nger) or bad (SEE-ntunado), gets ₱25,000.

=== Rounds ===
1. Two or False
  Each mystery singer is given two different identities as a good and bad singer, with one of them is a real identity.
2. The Voice is Syncing
  Each mystery singer performs a lip sync to a song; good singers mime to a recording of their own, while bad singers mime to a backing track by another vocalist.
3. Play it by Hear
  Three random panelists are wearing headphones to listen to a recording of assigned mystery singer that lasts for 15 seconds. Afterward, the panelist defends the mystery singer and convince the guest artist to choose them for a final performance.

== Episodes ==
=== Guest artists ===
Legend:
Good singer
Bad singer

2019 games
Episode		Guest artist (Note: Players' notes: For the returning guest artists (who also include foreigners and former good singers), names are displayed in italics.; For the mixed groups, names who identified as bad singers are displayed in italics.)	SEE-cret songers (In their respective numbers and aliases)					
#	Date	Guest artist	Elimination order					Winner
#	Date	Guest artist	Two or False	The Voice is Syncing		Play it by Hear		Winner
1	August 10, 2019	Momshies (Karla Estrada, Jolina Magdangal, and Melai Cantiveros)	3. Lovely Joy Fernandez; (Humanap ka ng Pocket)	4. Arnel Talisic; (Butcher Head on my Shoulder)	2. Rocky Domingo; (Palibhasa Ra-rock-e)	5. Renz Francisco; (Jockey Kiray)	6. Miggy Alabado; (Tren, Tren, Go Away)	1. James Javier; Coaching Tiger, Hidden Dragon
2	August 17, 2019	Nadine Lustre	2. Sanidad Delfimar Jr.; (Basta't Magbantay ka Lamang)	5. Vincent del Rosario; (Eh KZ Bata)	3. Vincent Esmores; (The Fruit, The Whole Fruit, and Nothing But the Fruit)	1. Cristina Alburo; (Bakit ang Chubby mo'y Binata Ka?)	4. Angelica Alves; (Ako si Mr. Suave. Joy-joy-joy! Joy-joy-joy!)	6. Neri Monserate; It's All Kambing Back to me Now
3	August 24, 2019	Just a Stranger cast (Anne Curtis and Marco Gumabao (Note: Despite not singing, they were still counted as guest artists.))	2. Johanna Marie Obias; (Second Rate, Trying Hard Co-piga!)	5. Vince Val Sanchez; (Baa Band Black Sheep)	1. Julius Calera; (Nurse Come, Nurse Serve)	4. Everod Bancifra; (For He's a Noli Good Fellow)	3. Aisa Falcis; (Tayo mag Audio-Audio)	6. Melanie de Goroztiza; The Greatest Shoeman
4	August 31, 2019	Ben&Ben	6. Rhondel Reyes; (Tol me When it Hurts)	3. Mark Joseph Llanera; (Binhi-binhing Pilipinas)	2. Princess Monsanto; (Undies Eigenmann)	4. Janica Marcelo; (Thank You Fairy Much)	1. Fin Ramirez; (Darren Es-plant-o)	5. Cristine de Silva; Baby the Night
5	September 7, 2019	Idol Philippines alumni (Lance Busa, Lucas Garcia, and Zephanie Dimaranan)	3. Mark Anthony Bantoto; (Mesa Zaragoza)	2. Luz Gulane; (Nosi Balasa)	4. Joms Ramos; (Chicken Kill with a Smile, Chicken Wound with Her Eyes)	6. Dereck Reyes; (Church for the Idol Philippines)	5. Rovin Cerio; (Wag Dyan! Utility ako Diyan)	1. Eufemia Erese; Army Martin
6	September 14, 2019	Kamp Kawayan (Elha Nympha and Bamboo)	2. Miko Jay Calera; (Waiter Minute Kapeng Mainit)	1. Rickcell Almendra; (Pinoy Gig Brother)	5. Roselle Culpo; (Tula Lilipas Din ang Ulan)	3. Angel Malit; (Minsan Lang Kalan Iibigin)	4. Roberto Nava; (Oh Tukso... Laruan mo Ako!)	6. Ashley Lacambra; Record J. Puno
7	September 21, 2019	MayWard (Maymay Entrata and Edward Barber)	3. Jean Kiley; (When Hotel me That You Loved Me)	1. Edric Ulang; (When I Wash Your Man)	4. Mary Pearl Guansing; (Meat, Myself, and I)	2. Christalene Brioso; (China Magdayao)	6. JC Rusit; (Kung Fu Banda)	5. John Arvin Jimenez; Leyte I Had the Strangest Feeling
8	September 28, 2019	Alcasid Family (Ogie and Leila Alcasid)	3. Jonel Palma; (Lawn Distance Relationship)	2. Noralyn Guiabel; (Nurse and Foremost)	4. Janette Quilao; (Maa-rich... Taya!)	6. Nelfred Espina; (Shotty Dope)	5. Raymond Casipong; (Isaw, Dala-wow, Tat-low)	1. Kenzel Silvano; Bakit Kape Nakita?
9	October 5, 2019	Yassi Pressman	5. Ronnel Masamoc; (Agency Your Voice)	3. Lara Dianne Lee; (Swim-pleng Tulad Mo)	1. Regie Java; (Nanay Wala Nang Wakas)	6. John Ray Garcia; (The Way You Make me Film)	4. Alexis Leyson; (Hatid It My Way...)	2. Rose Ann Villanueva; Mahal Foreign Kita
10	October 12, 2019	BuDaKhel (Bugoy Drilon, Daryl Ong, and Michael Pangilinan)	1. Lerry Evasco; (Wig Will Rock You)	3. Alvin Blasquiño; (How Do I Breed Without You)	6. Susainne Caylan; (Man-gin ka na Naman)	4. Jeffrey Barquilla; (Hari ng Sa-blind)	2. Arnel Lomocso; (It's Been a Guard Days Night)	5. Gyla Mae Castro; Cover da Bakod
11	October 19, 2019	Pascual Family (Piolo and Iñigo Pascual)	3. Jay Gonzales; (You've Lost That Clubbin' Feeling)	2. Mary Jane Magsino; (Soap Sick of Love Songs)	4. Bemilyn Dordas; (Bride and Tested)	5. Darryl Narciso; (Pay When Cable)	6. Ella Labrado; (Stop, Look, and LizQuen)	1. Derrick Taberna; Alagang Filipina
12	October 26, 2019	Unforgettable cast (Sarah Geronimo, Ara Mina, and Kim Molina)	3. Princess Ligon; (Pwes Nagkaka-manika)	2. Jonard Estrellado; (I Want to Bake Free)	4. Kevin Mendoza; (The Prints of Egypt)	6. Billeynie Roque; (Oops!... I Kiddie Again)	1. Chrys Rivera; (Now Yosi me, Now You Don't)	5. Kaye Malapitan; Candle with Care
13	November 2, 2019	Sheryn Regis	3. Jennie de Guzman; (Scary Pie Picache)	1. MJ Novelo; (Lamay Bahay Aming Bati)	2. Ria Lo; (Half, Half, and Away)	5. Shanilyn Bella; (Zombie-pol Want it All)	6. Blue Jay Hosana; (Third Eye Will Always Love You)	4. Rain Jacinto; Happy Walo-ween
14	November 9, 2019	Neocolours (Note: Season highlight: Neocolours (ep. 14) designated as new players, which includes the returning Ito Rapadas.)	1. Lucilla Pabunan; (Pahid Kailan)	2. Limbo Arcenal; (Kung ano ang Bruno, Siya rin ang Bunga)	3. Jenny Villarin; (Avocado-e-ga-ha)	5. Cara Pelisan; (Barya Mercedes)	4. Jomar Valdez; (April Good, I Knew That I Would)	6. Ian Kenneth Deuna; HRM The One That You Love
15	November 16, 2019	Titos of Manila (Christopher de Leon, Tirso Cruz III, and Edgar Mortiz)	3. John Carlo Guba; (Tikas of Manila)	1. Farrah Espinosa; (Sala sa Init, Sala Salamin)	5. Nazarene Roa; (Privates of the Caribbean)	6. Bench Ortiz; (Huwag mo Nang I-takong sa Akin)	2. Francis Kean Molbog; (Boy A-banda)	4. Cherrie Lazo; I Stir Believe that Somebody You and Me
16	November 23, 2019	The Heiress cast (McCoy de Leon and Janella Salvador)	4. Carlo Maravillas; (Antagal... Anong Pizza Na?)	3. Shane Dutosme; (Radio Know Where You're Goin' To)	1. EJ Magramoner; ('Di na Na-puto)	5. Reggie Antonino; (Janno po Ninong, Janno po Ninang)	2. Justin Jayce Mendoza; (And Then Biyahero Comes Along)	6. Adrian Agoring; Wood of Dance Philippines
17	November 30, 2019	Elaine Duran	1. Chenlealla Balane; (Copy-t Bisig)	2. Jojo Dismaya; (Selfie Tayo 'pag Maritime)	6. Jes Martinez; (Manga-rampa)	4. Jeffrey Vidal; (Para kang Sirang Placard)	5. Alexson Alipio; (I-magic All the People)	3. Lawrence Pajares; Langit ka... Lumpia Ako!
18	December 7, 2019	OPM Hitmen (Chad Borja, Rannie Raymundo, Richard Reynoso, and Renz Verano)	2. Carl William Ignacio; (Photo't Dinuguan)	1. Leo Lavides; (Sponge-dub Squarepants)	5. Robert Palma; (Kalan-karen)	6. Charie Retiza; (She Bags)	3. Ace Untalan; (Sleeve me Alone)	4. Dianne Bautista; Singka-math at Talong
Special	December 14, 2019	Doris Bigornia	4. Lyn Sumpaico; (Health me if You Can)	6. Lily Paran; (Mahjong Hilario)	3. Venus Mariposque; (Once Japan a Time)	2. Jamie de Joya; (Luwas Nice to Meet You)	5. Crisanto Santos; (Just When I Needed You Nose)	1. Antonio Sundiam; Hotel Eclipse of the Heart
19	December 21, 2019	The Voice Kids alumni (Vanjoss Bayaban, Cyd Pangca, and Carmelle Collado)	1. Mark Francis Reyes; (All the Jingle Ladies)	3. Alwyn Asuncion; (Papel de Ha-phone)	2. Marjorie dela Cruz; (Donut Cruz)	5. Harvey Ongaco; (Employ Marquez)	6. Helen Payawai; (Padyak na Pamumuhay)	4. Aimee Buzeta; Foreign Legaspi
Special	December 28, 2019	Ethel Booba	3. (Japan) Saku Okagawa; (Open Sashimi)	1. (Nigeria) Usseh Bryan Edako; (Sa Ilalim ng Footing Ilaw)	5. (United Kingdom) Michael Cole; (So British Christmas)	6. (South Korea) Flora Lee; (But If You Mask Me Too)	4. (Lithuania) Vika Radaviciūtė; (Beach Day I Live)	2. (Italy) Ciro Tarallo; A Piece of Kick

2020 games
Episode		Guest artist	SEE-cret songers (In their respective numbers and aliases)					
#	Date	Guest artist	Elimination order					Winner
#	Date	Guest artist	Two or False	The Voice is Syncing		Play it by Hear		Winner
20	January 4, 2020	SB19	2. Rodolfo Sumajestad, Jr.; (Mahal Corn o Mahal Acorn)	1. Christian Garcia; (Ba-quit Ako Mahihiya)	3. Kathy Repalda; (Titinda at Lilipas din Ako)	6. Wil Rasco; (The Tooth Hurts)	4. Len-Len Patinog; (James Feed)	5. Carlo Sheen Escaño; Shy ba ang Dahilan?
21	January 11, 2020	Arnel Pineda	3. Ron Magallanes; (Tayo'y Umalon, Tayo'y Sumigaw)	2. Tiffany Futari; (Tanong Nangyari sa Ating Dalawa?)	5. Jose Salgado; (Arnel Clean-eda)	4. Kimran Rebato; (Ikaw Marine ang Hanap ng Pusong Ligaw)	6. Haivey Nuera; (Vocals na Lang Kita Mamahalin)	1. Catherine Pao; Fiancé Knowles
22	January 18, 2020	Gonzaga Sisters (Toni and Alex Gonzaga)	6. Ulysses Marcos; (Kahera pa Lang Umiibig sa 'di Tamang Panahon)	1. Grace Mamalayan; (It's Gettin' Ate Here)	2. Jestoni Jimenez; (Tubig or Not Tubig)	5. Aris Matos; (A Long Alahas-ting Love)	4. Ezra Maulit; (Maraming Salamat. Walang Animal!)	3. Jay-ar Antolin; Cow... ang Pag-ibig na Hinintay
23	January 25, 2020	Task Force Agila (Smugglaz and Bassilyo)	4. Emong Rolusta; (Yoga a Friend in Me)	5. Louis Cosme; (Kay Tagal Mong Nawala... Babalik Nadine)	3. Marvin Dacillo; (Bangong Tagalog)	1. Precious Burton; (Banal na Kaso Santong Kabayo)	2. Jessa Mae Gajo; (Ledge, Ledge, Ledge mo ay Nakakasilaw)	6. Beth Uduba; Bazaar Talo
24	February 1, 2020	VinaShine (Vina Morales and Sunshine Cruz)	4. Elle Mayor; (K-pop Tumibok ang Puso)	1. Patricia Nicodemus; (Dan-dan-dan-dance)	3. Gerald Raymond Sims; (This is the Driller! Driller Night!)	2. Mark Anthony Villanueva; (Langit, Lupa, Relyeno)	5. Archie Panting; (Bitbit, Bitbit, Sabi ng Tsuper ng Jeep)	6. Hazel Joy Talana; Jake Kwenta
25	February 8, 2020	Juris and Sitti	1. Jaycee Tubao; (Maginoo Pero Medyo Blush-tos)	6. Jocelyn Ariola; (Buga ka Day)	2. Edison Arenas; (Isang Ballad ka Lang)	3. Adonis Coronacion; (My Heart Ghost Shalala-la-la)	5. Jennelyn Badao; (Pa-Thai. Mali Sya!)	4. Mary Jane Oliva; Phone This Moment On
26	February 15, 2020	James, Pat, and Dave (Awra Briguela, Ronnie Alonte and Donny Pangilinan)	4. Adonis Santos; (Lemon Akong Nais Malaman)	3. Gieloise Cleofas; (Chacha-kyan Kita)	5. Mylene Lopeña; (Not Sopas)	6. Ryan Badiola; (Maling A-kalat)	1. Jean Rose Canja; (Jumbo Hotdog! Yaya Mo Ba 'To?)	2. Franzee Blanco; Baby C D E F G
27	February 22, 2020	The Gold Squad (Kyle Echarri, Francine Diaz, Seth Fedelin, and Andrea Brillantes)	2. Jeffrey Ferrer; (As Pares as I'm Concerned)	3. Reynante Lauta; (Hasta Masahista, Baby)	5. Red Aragon; (Show me How You Bag Tag!)	6. Luis Buenviaje; (This Isda Voice)	1. Rosielyn Tubil; (Easter Dreamboy)	4. Mary Rose Roxas; Fees be With You
28	February 29, 2020	A Soldier's Heart cast (Vin Abrenica, Nash Aguas, Gerald Anderson, Yves Flores, and Elmo Magalona)	5. Jassy Calupitan; (It's a Smell World)	1. April Rose Tolentino; (Anyeong Paki mo sa Long Hair Ko)	2. Liza Ardines; (Subic at Langis)	6. Mheryl Cruz; (Jade Durias)	4. Kristen Joy Evangelista; (Yarn Tayo Eh!)	3. Jen Vega; Karton Character
29	March 7, 2020	Geneva Cruz	5. Denise Nayve; (Baraha ka sa Buhay Mo)	1. Nathalie Colipano; (Is That Your Final Usher?)	3. Dong Ali; (Wala Kayo Saklolo Ko!)	6. Joeman Vito; (Pilay that Funky Music)	4. Reden dela Cruz; (Maligayang Bagger Taon)	2. Jerold Tamayo; Radyo Gwapito
30	March 14, 2020	Frankie Pangilinan	2. Mitch Nalcot; (Trekking Ball)	5. Jay-r Estudillo; (Ja-nurse del Prado)	3. Nicole Foster; (Sikat-riona Gray)	4. Donna Socorro; (Hong Kong Kailangan mo Ako)	6. Joannara Nevado; (Arnis-ty is the Best Policy)	1. Zeny Benlot; Till There Wash You

=== SING-vestigators ===
Legend:
Regular SING-vestigator
Additional SING-vestigator
Guest SING-vestigator

Apps		Panelists in attendance (Sorted by first appearance, with episode designations)
g#	p#	Panelists in attendance (Sorted by first appearance, with episode designations)
32	1	Wacky Kiray (1–30; sp. 1–2)
31	2	Alex Gonzaga (1–21, 23–30; sp. 1–2); Andrew E. (2–30; sp. 1–2)
28	1	Bayani Agbayani (1–2, 4, 6–14, 16–23, 25–30; sp. 1–2)
14	1	Jobert Austria (15–16, 18–20, 22–23, 26–30; sp. 1–2)
13	1	KaladKaren (1–3, 5, 7, 10, 19–21, 24, 26–28)
12	1	Angeline Quinto (1–3, 5, 8, 11–13, 17, 24–25, 29)
11	1	Kean Cipriano (6, 9, 14–16, 18, 22–23, 30; sp. 1–2)
1	2	Alex Calleja (4); Roxanne Barcelo (18)

== Reception ==
Legend:
Highest rated episode
Lowest rated episode

No.	Title	Air date	Timeslot (PhST)	Placement		Rating		Ref(s)
No.	Title	Air date	Timeslot (PhST)	TS	EV	Rank	Points	Ref(s)
1	"Momshies"	August 10, 2019	Saturday, 10:00 pm	1	7	10	16.7%	
2	"Nadine Lustre"	August 17, 2019	Saturday, 10:00 pm	1	5	5	17.1%	
3	"Just a Stranger"	August 24, 2019	Saturday, 10:00 pm	1	5	6	17.2%	
4	"Ben&Ben"	August 31, 2019	Saturday, 10:00 pm	1	10	15	13.5%	
5	"Idol Philippines Alumni"	September 7, 2019	Saturday, 10:00 pm	1	8	11	14.5%	
6	"Kamp Kawayan"	September 14, 2019	Saturday, 10:00 pm	1	9	14	12.2%	
7	"MayWard"	September 21, 2019	Saturday, 10:00 pm	1	7	11	14.8%	
8	"Alcasid Dynasty"	September 28, 2019	Saturday, 10:00 pm	1	9	12	13.3%	
9	"Yassi Pressman"	October 5, 2019	Saturday, 10:00 pm	1	8	12	12.6%	
10	"BuDaKhel"	October 12, 2019	Saturday, 10:00 pm	1	10	16	11.4%	
11	"Pascual Dynasty"	October 19, 2019	Saturday, 10:00 pm	1	10	15	12%	
12	"Unforgettable"	October 26, 2019	Saturday, 10:00 pm	1	10	18	9.2%	
13	"Sheryn Regis"	November 2, 2019	Saturday, 10:00 pm	1	10	15	12.3%	
14	"Neocolours"	November 9, 2019	Saturday, 10:00 pm	1	10	13	11.7%	
15	"Titos of Manila"	November 16, 2019	Saturday, 10:00 pm	1	10	16	9.7%	
16	"The Heiress"	November 23, 2019	Saturday, 10:00 pm	1	10	15	10.3%	
17	"Elaine Duran"	November 30, 2019	Saturday, 10:30 pm	1	9	18	8.8%	
18	"OPM Hitmen"	December 7, 2019	Saturday, 10:00 pm	1	10	13	10.3%	
Special	"Doris Bigornia"	December 14, 2019	Saturday, 10:30 pm	1	10	19	7.1%	
19	"The Voice Kids Alumni"	December 21, 2019	Saturday, 10:00 pm	1	9	13	10.8%	
Special	"Ethel Booba"	December 28, 2019	Saturday, 10:00 pm	1	9	9	10.5%	
20	"SB19"	January 4, 2020	Saturday, 10:00 pm	2	9	17	10.2%	
21	"Arnel Pineda"	January 11, 2020	Saturday, 10:00 pm	1	8	10	12.9%	
22	"Gonzaga Sisters"	January 18, 2020	Saturday, 10:00 pm	1	8	15	10.5%	
23	"Task Force Agila"	January 25, 2020	Saturday, 10:00 pm	2	10	18	8.9%	
24	"VinaShine"	February 1, 2020	Saturday, 10:00 pm	1	9	16	11.4%	
25	"Juris and Sitti"	February 8, 2020	Saturday, 10:00 pm	1	9	16	11%	
26	"James, Pat, and Dave"	February 15, 2020	Saturday, 10:00 pm	1	9	14	12.1%	
27	"The Gold Squad"	February 22, 2020	Saturday, 10:00 pm	1	9	14	13.3%	
28	"A Soldier's Heart"	February 29, 2020	Saturday, 10:00 pm	1	8	14	13.2%	
29	"Geneva Cruz"	March 7, 2020	Saturday, 10:00 pm	1	9	16	12.9%	
30	"Frankie Pangilinan"	March 14, 2020	Saturday, 10:00 pm	1	10	19	8.8%	

Source: Kantar Media Philippines
