= I Can See Your Voice (Philippine game show) season 5 =

Television game show season

I Can See Your Voice
- Season 5
- Starring: Bayani Agbayani; MC Muah; Chad Kinis; Jennica Garcia; Lassy; Long Mejia; Negi; Divine Tetay; Angeline Quinto; Alora Sasam
- Hosted by: Luis Manzano
- Winners: Good singers: 49; Bad singers: 51
- No. of episodes: 100

Release
- Original network: Kapamilya Channel; A2Z and TV5 (simulcasts) (Note: The fifth season began airing on Kapamilya Channel and A2Z at episode 1 on March 4, 2023, followed by TV5 at episode 2 on March 11, 2023. However, some episodes are also delayed during PBA games.)
- Original release: March 4, 2023 – July 14, 2024

Season chronology
- ← Previous; Season 4

The fifth season of the Philippine television mystery music game show I Can See Your Voice first premiered on Kapamilya Channel and A2Z on March 4, 2023, followed by its airing debut on TV5 on March 11, 2023. It is also the third season in ICSYV franchise to have aired of at least 100 episodes. (Note: With other two being (also) the Philippine 1st season (longest-running by episode count; 128) (Note: The 1st season has originally scheduled to air for 26 episodes (at 13 weeks), with Moira Dela Torre playing on its tentative (26th episode) finale on December 10, 2017. Due to "unprecedented high ratings", an additional 102 episodes were added (at 54 weeks) until the season's formal conclusion on January 6, 2019.) and Thai 3rd season (longest-running by duration with 708 days; 101 eps).)

== Gameplay ==
=== Format ===
According to the original South Korean rules, the guest artist(s) must attempt to eliminate bad singers during its game phase. At the final performance, the last remaining mystery singer is revealed as either good or bad by means of a duet between them and one of the guest artists.

At the end of each round, an eliminated mystery singer gets a consolation prize starting from ₱5,000 (for the first round), ₱10,000 (for the second round), to ₱15,000 (for the third round). If the last remaining mystery singer is good, the guest artist(s) receive an Eye-ward trophy. The winning mystery singer, regardless of being good (SEE-nger) or bad (SEE-ntunado), gets ₱25,000.

=== Rounds ===
1. Everybody Sync
  The mystery singers are divided into batches, (Note: Gameplay note: The Everybody Sync! round may perform through a batch of trios or pairs (in a lip sync battle against each other).) and each of them would have to perform lip sync individually.
2. Two or False
  Each mystery singer is given two different identities as a good and bad singer, with one of them is a real identity.
3. Clues Open
  The host has randomly assigned clues about the mystery singer, and then the guest artist must choose a clue for each one.
  - A Whole New Word — The panelist is given a statement with an assigned "keyword" to one of the remaining mystery singers. Good singers have true statements, while bad singers have their statements fabricated.
  - Ano Box? — Inside a semi-concealed container, the panelist must release an evidential piece by one of the remaining mystery singers, except music-related items (i.e. ballpen, hairbrush, flashlight, etc.).
  - Good Night Silip — The guest artist is presented with a preshow rehearsal video by one of the remaining mystery singers.
  - Hula Bira and Shape, Rattle, and Roll — The panelist has to make its own premonition by one of the remaining mystery singers. Good singers have true statements, while bad singers have their statements fabricated.
  - Lights, Camera, Reaction — The guest artist is presented with a video package including witnesses reacting to one of the remaining mystery singers when they hear on its own performance that would appear on the show.
  - Stop, Spluk, and Listen — The guest artist must interrogate to one of the remaining mystery singers by audio message, but pitch-shifted to obscure their actual vocals.
  - Tabi-tabi Po — The guest artist asks a question to one of the remaining mystery singers of their choice that can answer with non-verbal communication.

== Episodes ==
Legend:
Good singer
Bad singer

=== 2023 ===
Episode		Guest artist (Note: Players' notes: For the returning guest artists (who also include foreigners and former good singers), names are displayed in italics.; For the mixed groups, names who identified as bad singers are displayed in italics.)	SEE-cret songers (In their respective numbers and aliases)				
#	Date	Guest artist	Elimination order				Winner
#	Date	Guest artist	Everybody Sync	Two or False	Clues Open		Winner
1	March 4, 2023	APO Hiking Society (Note: Season highlights: APO Hiking Society (ep. 1) designated as a group, in which different members playing on subsequent games are actually returned; Danny Javier, Boboy Garrovillo, and Jim Paredes have been played.; Drag Race Philippines alumni Corazon Filipinas and Turing Quinto (ep. 12) are assisted by the returning Ice Seguerra for his duet performance.; VST & Company (ep. 20) designated as a group, in which different members playing on subsequent games are actually returned; Male Rigor and Monet Gaskell have been played.; Crazy as Pinoy (ep. 40) designated as new players, which include the returning Bassilyo.; Foreign guest artists: Sandara Park (ROK; ep. 47) and Kobie Brown (GBR; ep. 60); As part of its transition to then-upcoming quiz game show Rainbow Rumble, Wrive (ep. 100) played as guest artists.)	4. Joseph Cajepe; (Apat, Yema, Anim)	5. Tonton Toledana; (I Really Have to Seat You Free)	3. Rafael Puzon; (Pinta Tail on the Donkey)	1. Kenneth Cal; (Julius Scissor)	2. Raphael Simbulan; Daya Inside to Hold You
2	March 5, 2023	Darren Espanto	3. Jhon Enric Malonzo; (Dua Sleep-a)	2. Joshua Ronett; (Puti LaBelle)	5. Regine Monge; (Cashier Tayo, Sumakit ang Ulo Ko)	1. Charles Matthew Binay; (Sira Geronimo)	4. Blessy Joy Noroña; Lovi Phone
3	March 11, 2023	AlJay (Aljon Mendoza (Note: Despite not singing, they were still counted as guest artists.) and Jayda Avanzado)	3. Ryan Manabat; (Si I.D., Si Lorna, o Si Fe?)	2. Mia Poblete; (Sharon Bumenta)	4. Meache-ann Atico; (Rock the Booth)	1. Willirose dela Isla; (Visa Macuja)	5. Rolen Mae Peñas; Jog and Jill
4	March 12, 2023	The Voice Kids cast (Martin Nievera, Bamboo, and Robi Domingo)	4. Maria Cecilia Estalilla; (Lola Want for Christmas is You)	1. Archie Temblor; (Gantsilyong Buhangin)	3. Mark Antonio Eugenio; (If There's a Will, There's Away)	5. Joan Mosquera; (Kasera Sera)	2. Andrei Subaybay; Draw Barrymore
5	March 18, 2023	Hori7on	1. Jenzen San Juan; (Tulog na Naman ang Buwan)	5. Annalisa Buensuceso; (General Douglas Mac-cartoon)	2. Anicka Lyka Yu; (Twinkle, Twinkle, Little Spar)	3. Bernardo Avellanoza; (Shaina Mag-dayo)	4. Roland Adalia; Dutch What Friends Are For
6	March 19, 2023	Pinoy Big Brother: Otso Housemates (Seth Fedelin, Criza Ta-a, and Karina Bautista)	1. Joy Lynn Ronquillo; (Treasure Mop)	5. Elle Punzalan; (Free-die Aguilar)	4. Giovane Ordanza; (Knock Knock! Host There?)	2. Razzel Gubian; (Pranses Magalona)	3. Gerry Rebancos; Uno, Dos, Trace
7	March 25, 2023	Alamat	2. Mark Bandal; (In the Medal of the Night)	4. Carlo Fabillar; (Doding Drag-a)	3. Joaquin Carlos; (Thirty Linen)	5. Arian Orario; (Hoy, Penoy Ako!)	1. Jhoas Sumatra; Bunny and Clyde
8	March 26, 2023	Nikki Valdez and Roselle Nava	4. Gerard Peralta; (Batang Quia-pose)	2. Theresa Ann Santos; (Mariah Caring)	1. Michelle Cindy de Guzman; (Annabelle Rampa)	5. Khai Soliman; (School-ang Ako Kung Wala Ka)	3. Marivi Ontimare; Pedi Mercury
9	April 1, 2023	Idol Philippines alumni (Kice and Khimo Gumatay)	5. Rose Marie Pumaras; (Luto Lapid)	3. Jeffrey Entrina; (Anne Curtains)	1. Mark Guinto; (Celeste Court-esi)	4. April Montes; (Layout Salonga)	2. Jayson Ilano; Trick or Trek
10	April 2, 2023	Raymond Lauchengco	5. Rey Zamora; (Aray. Ang Skit!)	3. Restie Gayoma; (Plano in the Dark)	1. Baby Joy Palatulon; (Life Begins at Poultry)	4. John San Juan; (Baron-diser)	2. Lorena dela Cruz; Wig mo Nang Itanong sa Akin
Season break: April 8 episode was pre-empted in observance of Holy Week 2023.
11	April 9, 2023	John Arcilla	1. Samuel Petalcorin; (Ikaw na Ba si Mr. Ride?)	4. Gerald Villegas; (Dare Ate Charo)	2. Rodel Magtoto; (Isla Pang Araw)	5. Chris Ymas; (Gym-ples Romana)	3. Argie Dacera; Jock Tabudlo
12	April 15, 2023	Drag Race Philippines alumni (Corazon Filipinas, Turing Quinto and Ice Seguerra)	4. Mark Pamin; (SK from Alcatraz)	3. Yesha Paderog; (Kapit-sisig)	1. Clorinda Masim; (See You Letter!)	5. Ina Gotera; (Kulang sa Pancit)	2. Rio Guanlao; Choir-ta o Kahon?
13	April 16, 2023	Kim Molina and Jerald Napoles	1. Rai Rex Rodriguez; (Kahit Kuting Pagtingin)	5. Ma. Anariza Dalde; (Sell Mariano)	4. Johndel Macalam; (Ghost-o ko Nang Bumitaw)	2. Aurelia Lucas; (Meryl Sweep)	3. Romel Lacorte; Farm This Moment On
14	April 22, 2023	Luis Manzano and Joey Generoso	1. Jayrard Perez; (Bakes Battalion)	3. Joevil Masayon; (Gift You Asked Me To)	2. Racquel Dy; (Ice Ganda)	5. Ma. Joymee Isidro; (Alog and Lasting Love)	4. Marilyn Fabul; What's Love Goto do With It
15	April 29, 2023	Frenchie Dy and Bituin Escalante	2. Shiena Mae Fortin; (I Can Bus Myself Flowers)	4. Raizen Jhamil Paulo; (School me Maybe)	3. Reynan Amar Roma; (Anji Solve-acion)	5. Kievy Riselle Marcos; (Love at First Write)	1. Gina Peña; Sana Dalawa ang Puto Ko
16	April 30, 2023	Lyca Gairanod	4. Gary Boy Punzalan; (Let's Kulit a Day!)	2. Bernard Baldoza; (When I Wash Your Man)	1. Martha Alpez; (And Then Kahera Comes Along)	3. Cian Liba, Jr.; (Leave me Bread-less)	5. Fatima Famoso; Dealer Ikaw
17	May 7, 2023	Vina Morales	3. Arnold Olisco; (My Best Friend's Welding)	2. Ricky Roma; (I've Pool-en For You)	1. Jonathan Escaño; (Bayani Ag-bahay-ani)	5. Rodel Capiral; (Hall Laude)	4. Lucia Macatigbac; May Bukas Spa
18	May 13, 2023	Pops Fernandez	2. Jazmine Ignacio; (Marc Slogan)	3. Dexlyn Mengorio; (Bags Bunny)	5. Camille Reyes Molina; (Hurry Styles)	1. Precious Mhel Flores; (Leave me Alon!)	4. Queenie Cabarloc; Sun ka Man Naroroon
19	May 14, 2023	ASAP Sessionistas (Juris, Sitti, and Princess Velasco)	1. Crisel Niño Brosas; (Brad Feet)	5. Edgar Amper; (Black-pig in Your Area)	3. Jan King Manguiat; (Arcade Bagatsing)	4. Anne Mendoza; (Wine, Wine, Wine, Delilah?)	2. Jerome Muñoz; Make it Isip on Me
20	May 20, 2023	VST & Company	3. Michael Vincent dela Peña; (Livin' La Visa Loca)	2. Alex Escanella; (Mascot Kasama Kita)	1. Sharry Padilla; (Junk ka Magaling!)	5. Xedd Lindayag; (Enrique Heels)	4. Alexander John Bisda; I Just Wanna be Clothes to You
21	May 27, 2023	SB19	2. Marvin Lubao; (Steak my Breath Away)	5. Analyn Villa; (Kinig me Softly)	4. Lyn Mortega; (Somebody to Clean On)	3. Joan Perez; (Home Mamon da Riles)	1. Lhenard Cardozo; Dalhin de Leon
22	May 28, 2023	Dilaw	2. Arceli Orbita; (Face be Good to Me)	3. John Kenneth Cuare; (Games Reid)	5. Margelyn Mijares; (Hygiene Velasquez)	1. Christian Romwald Caliguia; (Ita-phone, Ta-phone N'yo)	4. Ryan Sanvictores; Hand I'm Telling You
23	June 3, 2023	Randy Santiago	3. Eljohn Pagalan; (Shade That You Love Me)	5. Gemmare Castillo; (How do I Get You Salon?)	1. Franklyn Catacte; (Pizza Heartache)	2. Cesar Brinces; (A Long, Long Time Tago)	4. Monalie Duka; Keanu Leaves
24	June 10, 2023	Tawag ng Tanghalan alumni (Marko Rudio, Lyka Estrella, and Villier Villalobo)	3. Jay Bautro; (Teller About It)	5. Ephraim dela Cruz; (Mix You Like Crazy)	2. Carlvin Musni; (Bath Naman Gano'n?)	1. Luis Fernando Pinili; (Kung Data-yo Pwede)	4. Kenneth Gonzales; Sina-saba Kita
25	June 11, 2023	Beks (Donita Nose, Divine Tetay, and Tonton Soriano)	3. Vincent Seco; (Hollow, Love, Goodbye)	2. Knoella Fuentes; (White Can't It Be)	5. Juniel Abriera; (Imelda Puppet)	4. Mark Andrew Asaytuno; (Chef of Staff)	1. Ardy Canada; Stoney Labrusca
26	June 17, 2023	Cattleya Killer cast (Zsa Zsa Padilla and Ricky Davao)	2. Jerald Paul Valdez; (One, Trophy, Four, Five)	1. Remon Ultra; (Demo Lovato)	5. Michelle Poblete; (Code Ledesma)	4. Jonabelle Barque; (Felix the Cut)	3. Ryan Gastillo; One Flash One Equals Two
27	June 18, 2023	Marco Sison and Nonoy Zuñiga	4. Marianne Morta; (Angeline Hinto)	5. Aries Santiago; (Banana Bang Pag-ibig?)	1. Heron Sandan; (Tuna na Tuna, Mahal ka sa Akin)	3. Pat Julienne dela Cruz; (Iced Mukha Frap)	2. Charlie Magdaleno; Kiddie Estrada
28	June 25, 2023	Regine Velasquez	3. Carmina Sunico; (Breed and Butter)	5. Beth Giray; (Bazaar Love Triangle)	4. Ronelyn Villarosa; (Pose mo 'Yan Teh!)	2. Jojin Belo; (Sew Ramirez)	1. Jennifer Jorge; Amoy Isang Pinoy
29	July 1, 2023	Sheryn Regis and Ima Castro	4. April Mary Conchada; (Pulis be Careful With my Heart)	5. Cesar Malali; (Kim Choo-choo)	2. Ara Grace Along; (Bake Cuenca)	3. Edilyn Constantino; (Our Lechon for Today Is...)	1. Valerie Rosales; Damit Mong Alam!
30	July 2, 2023	Gino Padilla	5. James Quillo; (Fan-cine Diaz)	3. Thea Uy; (Keep, Keep Blading Love)	4. Joseph Winters; (Smile and Say Chess!)	1. Peachy Punzalan; (Zumba Cum Laude)	2. PJ Anzano; Maymay Ent-run-ta
31	July 9, 2023	Laurel Family (Ayen and Franco Laurel)	2. Dennis Erquiza; (Mango No. 5)	5. Rommel Mendoza; (Tubig or Not Tubig?)	1. Sheryl Lou Organo; (Law Mejia)	4. Jaycel Estrellado Bihis; (Wag Kang PBB!)	3. Manuelito Mendoza; Ejay Fabcon
32	July 15, 2023	1st.One	2. Rowel Albuera; (Rush Awa Traffic)	3. June Vasquez; (Shoot Puno!)	1. Ronnie Ropero; (Patayin sa Indak si Barbara)	5. Regine Relos; (Pan Medina)	4. Cherry Mae Pelis; Taylor Sweep
33	July 22, 2023	Pira-pirasong Paraiso cast (KD Estrada, Alexa Ilacad, Ronnie Alonte, Loisa Andalio, Elisse Joson, and Charlie Dizon)	1. Brix Somera; (Bulb Marley)	3. Julius Sambitan; (Apoy Isang Sirena)	4. John Paul Besa; (No-volley's Perfect)	5. Joel Roque; (Wish I Wash a Bird)	2. Kim Tresvalles; 4:30 Na, ATV Na!
34	July 23, 2023	Ria Atayde, Jane Oineza, and Lyka Estrella	5. Margie Ramos; (Beh Beauty Nga!)	3. Jacqueline Velarde; (Ma-teeth de Leon)	4. James Radney Antonio; (Rice Seguerra)	1. Eloisa Villaflor; (X-ray-ning Men)	2. May Lopez; Med Madela
35	July 30, 2023	Mayonnaise	3. Gem Fernandez; (Once Japan a Time)	1. Jonathan Alcala; (PPE Smith)	5. Beverly Solidum; (In Flair-ness)	2. Darwin Granados; (Legs Groove Tonight!)	4. Nory Rose Alde; We've Only Just Belgian
36	August 5, 2023	Tres Marias (Cooky Chua, Bayang Barrios, and Lolita Carbon)	3. Mark Anthony Espineda; (Cookie-langan mo Ako)	1. RV Laguitao; (Sarah ay Ikaw na Nga)	2. Richard Diaz; (Boom Pa-net!)	5. Eddie Catarata; (Uling Ibalik ang Tamis ng Pag-ibig)	4. Rannie Besa; Indiana Jhongs
37	August 12, 2023	Jamie Rivera, Fabio Santos, and Imogen Cantong	3. Ryan Tomes; (Ice it Was!)	4. Charlotte Andrea Nakpil; (Ri-chart Gutierrez)	1. Romeo "Mio" Dacer, Jr.; (Hiking ka na Lang)	2. AJ Tolentino; (Beauty and the Vase)	5. Thel Guiyab; Money Batumbakal
38	August 19, 2023	Agsunta	3. Reagan Pabillo; (Basket ba Ganyan?)	1. Mark Nelson Leal; (Ticket or Leave It?)	2. Raincurvin Paloma; (Sitaw, Hataw, Patani)	4. Myhre Tabanao; (Chicken Work it Out)	5. Daisyree Ferrer; Tanda-ra Park
39	August 20, 2023	YGIG	1. Mary Grace Pastrana; (Lato-lato Pik)	3. Alyssa Bernal; (Keeper Ravena)	4. Mateo Tabaniag III; (Machine-sinang Usapan)	2. Ryza Nicole Palos; (Sunshine Crews)	5. Jason Reginaldo; Chie Film-eno
40	August 26, 2023	Crazy as Pinoy	2. Joyce Boyones; (Permit the Frog)	4. John Rey Layan; (Barbie and Can)	1. Jesha Villamor; (Yosi Pressman)	3. Keeno Estrada; (Prof of Purchase)	5. Jerry Lasap; Cater Perry
41	September 3, 2023	PLUUS	3. Ralph Rency Puti; (Fencing Meeting You Alone in the Crowd)	1. Paolo Oliver Rosaldo; (PC Bonifacio)	2. Karl Christian Cortes; (Janella Seoul-vador)	5. Angela Zacarias; (Is it Bouquet if I Call You Mine?)	4. Marie Gold Vinoya; Eh Kasuy Bata!
42	September 10, 2023	Fractured cast (Francine Diaz, Seth Fedelin, Jeremiah Lisbo, Raven Rigor, and Sean Tristan)	1. Jasmin Ann Lee; (Subok mga Kapatid!)	2. Sherylen Pandaan; (The Divine Divi)	3. Angel Louise Miso; (Acting Cu Pung Singsing)	4. John Cedric Codera; (Tool Love You More)	5. King Isaiah Tabelisma; Pen & Pen
43	September 16, 2023	Erik Santos	3. Ralph Niño Esquejo; (Thesis the Moment)	1. Arjan Hantid; (Second-nya pa Rin Babalik)	4. Mary Jennifer Oriel; (That's All I Mask of You)	2. Poyd Cajes; (Drags to Riches)	5. Jojo Reso-or; Trike Hanopol
44	September 17, 2023	JMielle (JM dela Cerna and Marielle Montellano)	2. Angelica Abiera; (Show Show Padilla)	3. Mary Ann Soriano; (Shania Twin)	5. Mannelyn Beñacale; (The Iron Art)	4. Kimberly Rose Diaz; (He Was a Cater Boi)	1. Jamela Masculino; Tinda Turner
45	September 24, 2023	Jireh Lim	4. Bryan James Sumaquial; (Relo From the Other Side)	5. Joshua Lee; (Lobby Domingo)	1. Goffer James Lag-od; (Photo Kutchinta)	2. Ven Galuno; (For Your Eyes Unli)	3. Lance France Ocoma; Tako ang Nagwagi
46	October 1, 2023	Senior High cast (Gela Atayde, Elijah Canlas, Kyle Echarri, Miggy Jimenez, and Daniela Stranner)	2. Karl Patilleros; (Mesa de Gallo)	3. Jummil Cautiber; (Aso the Sign)	4. Matt Aldrick Gregorio; (A Very Food Girl)	5. Adrian Figueroa; (Aubrey Smiles)	1. Julius Ceazar Palalay; Harry-munding Munding
47	October 7, 2023	Sandara Park	4. Mike Lester del Mundo; (Offs!... I Did It Again)	1. Maria Luz Yape; (Mirror Akong Nais Malaman)	3. Mary Grace Bonifacio; (A Round of Haplos)	2. Romelyn Buenaflor; (Jugs and Pedi)	5. Jessie Mhay Buaron; Baa Baa Blackpink
48	October 14, 2023	Maymay Entrata	3. Mardellou Ibañez; (Read Alert)	1. Lovely Abadiano; (Cap, Cap and Away!)	2. Maria Kyra Luceno; (Let it Golf)	5. Alex Sandigan; (Pump up the Gem)	4. Grace Ann Reas; Araw-habi... Nasa Isip Ka
49	October 22, 2023	VXON	1. Denver Panimbatan; (Brick Segreto)	3. Niel Sarvida; (Pera-perasong Pera-iso)	2. Jenver Laragan; (Grad to Meet You!)	5. Erika Reyes; (Where Isda Love?)	4. Poelyn Batuigas; Mura dela Torre
50	October 28, 2023	Ara Mina	3. John Michael Lacida; (Balloon and Lasting Love)	1. Janna Mae Bobis; (Dito sa Pusa Ko)	4. Anna Rose Crespo; (Nora Horror)	5. Vince Samoya; (Mini Mess U)	2. Mica Santiago; Make it Wed You
51	November 4, 2023	Nina	1. Eleonowens Charm Cortez; (Jock and the Beanstalk)	2. Bambie Cuevas; (Havana Ulam-lam)	5. Vivian Peconda; (Thai a Yellow Ribbon)	3. Noel Jumadiao Jr.; (Isip me You're Looking For?)	4. Melanie Marzan; Yoga One That I Want
52	November 12, 2023	Nobita	5. Norvil Nazareno; (Alas Singko y Medyas)	4. Eden Samson; (Total Eclipse of The Cart)	1. Roxanne Dedumo; (Gift Here if You Can)	2. Liz Honey Requina; (Cry-zy For You)	3. John Brian Frial; No One Else Comes Clothes
53	November 19, 2023	Bini	2. Kate Samoya; (Buy and Seal)	3. Basty Askri; (Ikaw ang Lahat sa Archi)	4. John Apaso; (Beef Pa-rest)	1. Jannette Magno; (Tirso Cross III)	5. Patrick Aynera; I Don't Want Tamis a Thing
54	November 25, 2023	Shake, Rattle & Roll Extreme cast (AC Bonifacio, Sarah Edwards, and Paolo Gumabao)	3. Mikks Macamos; (Bu-cash na Lang Kita Mamahalin)	4. John Martin Sabigan; (Swallow Your Fried)	2. Cheska Velasco; (Goods-zilla)	5. Arbie Almario; (Ako Liga Wife)	1. MC Vergil Wayway; Saving All my Love Perya
55	November 26, 2023	In His Mother's Eyes cast (Roderick Paulate, LA Santos, and Maricel Soriano)	1. Jordan Ibañez; (Daan-iel Padilla)	3. Ryan Carlone Mantilla; (Opera o Bayong?)	2. Robert Valenzuela; (Nicole Kidney)	4. Oscar Verano Jr.; (Hello, Love, Dubai)	5. Jayson Padua; Weed or Without You
56	December 2, 2023	Janella Salvador	3. Robinson Alombro; (Kathryn Bar-nardo)	4. Mary Joy Veras; (Gem Carrey)	5. Remelyn Gumpay; (Justin Bibe)	1. Raffy Abella; (Pants not Dead)	2. John Michael Marimat; Andrea Free-llantes
57	December 3, 2023	Mitch Valdez and Tessie Tomas	2. Lorylyn Dichi; (Isang Tahong, Isang Sagot)	4. Cristy Paraiso; (One 'Nay Only)	3. Gerolyn Caluscusan; (Bigkas You Loved Me)	5. Houston Jamero; (You're Steer the One)	1. Tanya Marie Dee; Una Kang Naging Latin
58	December 9, 2023	Renz Verano	1. Jerson Presto; (How Jeep is Your Love)	4. Lea de Villa; (Wall at Once)	2. Leonel Dedase; (Senior Height)	5. John Rey Benedicto; (Nora Horror)	3. Rocetom Ultra; Bapor and After
59	December 10, 2023	When I Met You in Tokyo cast (Christopher de Leon, Darren Espanto, John Gabriel, Vilma Santos-Recto, and Lynn Ynchausti-Cruz)	3. Jeralyn Mortel; (Insure as i'm Standing Here)	4. Marites Tabuena; (Kinig to the Bones)	2. Victor Follero; (Toy All The Girls I Loved Before)	5. Dennis Engalla; (Huli-wood Movies)	1. Waylor Mayuga; Go-see Balasi
Season break: December 16 and 17 episodes were pre-empted on Kapamilya Channel and A2Z to give way for the airing of Forever Grateful: The 2023 ABS-CBN Christmas Special.
60	December 23, 2023	Tabing Ilog: the Musical cast (Kobie Brown, Akira Morishita (BGYO), Benedix Ramos, Anji Salvacion, and Jude Servilla)	2. Dia Mae Conog; (Mahal Foreign Kita)	1. Rowela Sandoval; (Minsan ang Minahal ay Account)	4. Mhelanie Lisay; (That's the Way A-ha A-ha, Elect It)	3. Stephanie Tantay; (Sales You Won't Let Go)	5. Violet Jurado; In the Balik of an Eye
61	December 24, 2023	Sharon Cuneta	4. Andre Canaria; (Swabber-do Nights)	5. Fred Berondo; (Tour be Continued...)	3. Carl Chris John dela Cruz; (Yogurt it All Over Him)	2. Marina Cemanis; (Toni Flower)	1. Elaine Bautista; Prito Ba? o Prito Ba?
62	December 30, 2023	G22	2. Vens Jimenez; (Wash a Wonderful World)	5. Sharon Silverio; (A-ngipin Ako na Umibig Sa'yo)	3. Jireh Acayen; (Goon ka, Dito Ako)	4. Danica San Buenaventura; (I Rest my Kiss)	1. Wowie Bryan Lee; Bernadette Semb-run-o
63	December 31, 2023	Magnus Haven	4. Ken Ken Salazar; (Visa Calzado)	1. Ariel Miranda; (All the Jingle Ladies)	5. Jennifer Cajigas; (Wife Your Tears)	3. Maricris Bermudez; (Lady Ga-guard)	2. Sheryl Recto; Pagmasdan mo nang Kabute

=== 2024 ===
Episode		Guest artist	SEE-cret songers (In their respective numbers and aliases)				
#	Date	Guest artist	Elimination order				Winner
#	Date	Guest artist	Everybody Sync	Two or False	Clues Open		Winner
64	January 6, 2024	JRoa	5. Teody Macasinag; (Chest Dating the Gangster)	3. Johnny delos Reyes, Jr.; (Hindi Bio Puwede)	2. Norwei John Enabe; (Cherry Tie Picache)	4. Rodrigo Dayapan; (To Whom it May Concert)	1. Third Bacnot; Can You Film the Love Tonight
65	January 7, 2024	Lara Maigue and Gian Magdangal	5. Kenneth Brian Vistan; (Golf the Distance)	4. Mark Anthony Doctama; (Skate Winslet)	2. Giannah Salminao; (Kanta Claus is Coming to Town)	3. Shai Belen; (Park the Herald Angel Sing)	1. Stephanie Dugaduga; You Know, I'm Bed, I'm Bed
66	January 13, 2024	Richard Reynoso	1. Jay-ar Dacomos; (Puto Head on my Shoulder)	2. John Christopher Santos; (Coffee-cially Missing You)	4. Analiza Batister; (I Know Him so Weld)	5. Marjoy Faucbit; (Iron ko na Sanang Magmahal)	3. Jerson Lumacad; Leather of the Band
67	January 20, 2024	Rosanna Roces	2. Nikki Culanag; (Resell Nava)	5. Lea Gelera; (Vacuum ka pa Nakita?)	1. Marc Dy; (I.T.-Atihan)	4. David Gloria; (Nice to Meat You)	3. Roy Fernandez; Karton Dalisay
68	January 27, 2024	SunKissed Lola	5. Jeffrey Dale Arellano; (Don't Rabbit In)	2. Jomarie Lumidao; (Bihis Accountancy)	1. Lance Escober; (Josh ko, Day!)	3. Francis Zulueta; (I-chef Bata)	4. Mercydita dela Cruz; What's Wrong with Secretary Skin?
69	February 3, 2024	Aga Muhlach	2. Jomar Jaurigue; (Math Maganda Ka!)	4. Ark Mintal; (Freeze Forgive Me)	3. Renato Borjal, Jr.; (Camp Buy me Love)	5. Joniel Asas; (Diet, Camarines Norte)	1. Sir Lancelot Villena; Balloon 5
70	February 10, 2024	Toni Fowler	5. Harake Hernandez; (Meet in the Needle)	1. Louise Sicat; (Kitchie Na-doll)	2. Princess Batas; (Mars Travel-o)	4. Michael del Nacion; (Ikaw ang Laot sa Akin)	3. Mary Ann Gascon; We Will Rag You!
71	February 11, 2024	Ogie Alcasid	1. Samuel Lagus; (Forest de Mayo)	2. Darwin Vargas; (Take me Out of the Dart)	5. Paolo Javellanos; (Piano na Kaya?)	4. Juvirj Caronongan; (Ben Ben de Sarapen)	3. Aldre Poyaoan; Busker Tayo Magkasama
72	February 18, 2024	Tawag ng Tanghalan alumni (Vensor Domasig, Eunice Encarnada, and Rea Gen Villareal)	2. Arnel Ferrer; (Biz Kita Kung Christmas)	1. Kien Limansag; (18 Tarot Diamond Ring)	5. Julito Mejorada; (Sino? Sino Bar Sila?)	4. RM Robles; (Art Simpson)	3. James Patrick dela Cruz; Water You Waiting For?
73	February 25, 2024	RnB Boys (Lucas Garcia, Bryan Chong, and JM Yosures)	1. PJ Olano; (Hike Can See Your Voice)	3. Sean Karl Caleja; (Theater be Peace on Earth)	4. Abegail Ramos; (Just Toilet You Know...)	5. Catherine Diala; (Baywang at Sibuyas)	2. John Patrick Cao Hok; Kung Sayaw Mo, 'Wag Mo!
74	March 3, 2024	Kenaniah and Arthur Miguel	3. Totche Mae Alesna; (Lady in Bread)	2. Rubielen Jarvata; (Shades the One)	4. Web Jain; (Eat, Spray, Love)	1. Frances Nikki Carpe; (Would Gulay to You, Baby?)	5. Erish Villareal; Walang Lapis, Walang Kulang
75	March 9, 2024	6cyclemind	5. Jose Angelo Camas; (I Can't Say Dubai to You)	3. Ralph Grimaldo; (Part of Your Word)	2. Eric Descutido; (Passion de Amor)	4. May Ann Patrono; (Loofah Gutierrez)	1. Julius Serdoncillo; Sense U Been Gone
76	March 16, 2024	Michael de Mesa	4. Jackson "Baby Ligaya" Aquino; (Manigong Bagoong Taon!)	1. Rans Magnaye; (Arena Franklin)	2. Abel Tabora; (Eiffel Tawa)	3. Mandy Cruz; (Host That Girl?)	5. Michael Ian Banogon; First Love Never Dives
77	March 23, 2024	Acel Bisa	3. Rosita Melendrez; (Serye Osmeña)	2. Elmer Barugo; (Bicol Scherzinger)	1. Sunnie Benagua; (The Pass and the Furious)	4. Cris Alvarez; (Polish Heart)	5. Lorraine Santos; Habulin mo Corn!
Season break: March 30 episode was pre-empted in observance of Holy Week 2024.
78	March 31, 2024	I Belong to the Zoo	5. Vilma Gulapo; (The Impossible Trim)	3. Jonathan Gascon; (When You Spray Nothing at All)	1. James Mingito; (Stamp Right Now!)	4. Alec Xavier Marcial; (When I Ball in Love)	2. Francisco Legaspi; Be-co-host of You
79	April 6, 2024	Justin (SB19)	2. Angelo Barcoma; (Measure Kupido)	4. Aljon "Jhazz" de Guzman; (Bag na Lang Kaya)	3. Exequiel Embate; (Vlog Eyed Peas)	1. Mark Joseph Navia; (Kiss and Sell)	5. Richard Austria; Deal ko Kayang Tangappin
80	April 13, 2024	Gary Valenciano	4. Airene Mendoza; (Twin Umuulan at Kapiling Ka)	3. Rashid Locsin; (Total Hair Clips of the Heart)	5. Princess Kyte Jumadil; (Ikaw Marine ang Nais Ko)	2. Don Harvey Cuadra; (Wala Kayo Saklolo Ko!)	1. Mark Joseph Villamosa; My Love Will See You Screw
81	April 21, 2024	Billy Crawford and Vhong Navarro	2. Christian Samillano; (Donate-ta Rose)	3. Ryan Mercado; (U.S. Me if I Love You)	1. Alexis Trinidad; (Mary Had a Little Lamp)	5. Charlon Guanga; (You're Info a Treat)	4. Jennifer Bie; Bed Affleck
82	April 28, 2024	Wency Cornejo	1. Raphael delos Santos; (Hanggang sa Huling Sandal-li)	5. Benedict Guillermo; (Sunshine on my Soldier)	3. Joemy Mark Revilla; (Summer-Summer Nating Abutin)	2. John Icel Ballesta; (Sofa Away)	4. Reshelle Joaquin; Pork of July
83	May 4, 2024	Neocolours	2. Emmeriza Garcia; (Bead of Roses)	1. Marimar Zaide; (From the Boto of my Heart)	5. Rommel Bernales; (Merong Kangkong Ano)	4. Michael John Lozada; (Taiwan it That Way)	3. Juvi Vertudez; Libing on a Jet Plane
84	May 5, 2024	Katrina Velarde	4. Esperanza Blandura; (Kalyeng Davila)	2. Ed Esparago; (Sorry Na, P.D. Ba)	1. Rose Ann Malapitan; (The Birds and the Beer)	5. Gerardo Mutia; (Footprints in the Sound)	3. Marilyn Genez; Catering Zeta-Jones
85	May 11, 2024	BGYO	1. Mark Chester Esquibel; (Pusit, Pusit, Real Good!)	2. Eugene Bautista; (Kapag Tumibok ang Piso)	4. Via Marie Dumayas; (Dish is How we Do It)	5. Juls Pastolero; (Hardware Out There)	3. Jenice Orpeza; Yellow Break Road
86	May 12, 2024	Rachel Alejandro	4. Glaiza Mae Adorable; (Tony Lambing-no)	1. Angelica Quintas; (My Only Hoop)	3. Liezyl Salvador; (Sweep Caroline)	5. Khristine Princess Capulong; (Cat Me, I'm Falling)	2. Stephanie Fernando; Chem What May
87	May 18, 2024	Lorraine Galvez and Jeremy Glinoga	4. Paula Bianca Andres; (Umaaraw, Umu-ulam)	5. Roviriel Sanita; (Icy Your True Colors)	1. Monico Angelo Tauyan; (Park-park ng Manok)	3. Tranx Risch; (A Face of Cake!)	2. Alexandre Dennis Cristobal; Speak-achu
88	May 19, 2024	The Juans	2. Paul Redzel Olivo; (Swiftie Shades of Grey)	4. Katherine June Caoile; (Gift I We're a Boy)	3. Klyde Gabriel delos Reyes; (Bakit Tamis Kitang Mahal)	5. Judy de Guzman; (I Believe I Can Pie)	1. Michael Pajanilla; Niyog Volante
89	May 25, 2024	Bugoy Drilon	4. Julie Ann Manzanilla; (Unlucky-laki ng Bulaklak)	3. Ludie Astillero; (Bike-kit Ngayon ka Lang?)	1. Daniel Enrico Campañero; (Iwan ko ba Kung Bakit Type Kita)	2. Edrex Cipres; (Work Hard, Plane Hard)	5. Keen Bularon; Lipat ng Pangarap
90	May 26, 2024	KAIA	1. Sheena Saneza; (Tinda Love You So)	4. Maria Fe Cariño; (So Near Yet Sofa)	3. Pauline Heart Malonzo; (Noodle Platoon)	2. Honeyrose Zalde; (You Are Note Alone)	5. Bell Andrew Abalos; Mais Racal
91	June 15, 2024	Juan Caoile and Kyleswish	1. Ellen Jamantoc; (You've Got Nail)	2. Angel Lyssa Salvador; (Pet-rick Garcia)	4. Jesel Olacao; (Kay Ganda ng Acting Musika)	5. Dominique Genada; (The Nation's Girl Group, Bili!)	3. Kaila Tomas; Agent ka na Naman
92	June 16, 2024	Chad Borja	4. Eleazar Lampa; (Teach Passing Night)	1. Vincent Bergantinos; (Juice The Way You Are)	5. Maria Silubaton; (Ending Eigenmann)	3. Celso Jr.; (This is the Greatest Shoe)	2. Benedict Cererro; P.A., Tuhod, Balikat, Ulo
93	June 22, 2024	Maki and Zushibois Band	2. Jerome Sudario; (Clean Eastwood)	4. Wendy Rebusta; (Tennis Rodman)	1. Ron Steven Hidalgo; (Dining na Bangus)	5. Ali Krisha Abulencia; (Only Fools Rash In)	3. Gayle Goboy; I Finally Phone Someone
94	June 23, 2024	Fe delos Reyes	4. Ken Bulan; (Kama Chameleon)	3. Jim; (Kung Echo na Lang Sana)	1. Rowena Beñares; (Geisha Zaragoza)	5. Froilan Flores; (Dumb and Tumbler)	2. Melanie Raqueño; Crispy! Basilio!
95	June 29, 2024	Pablo (SB19)	2. Gina Mendez; (Piliin mo ang Pia-pinas)	5. Joel Ludovice; (Goto Believe in Magic)	1. John Mark "Monica" Salazar; (Front Sinatra)	3. Jerold Sison; (You're Simply the Pest)	4. David Jonathan Alvarez; Aloe, Is it me You're Looking For
96	June 30, 2024	Mark Carpio	2. Efren Cagomoc; (He's Into Hair)	3. Suzette Cruz; (Juan Karlos Trabaho)	5. Danisa; (Gym Bulag)	4. Jeniere Castro; (Tira Lilipas Din ang Ulan)	1. Jayson Tomas; Too Manny to Mention
97	July 6, 2024	Kakai Bautista	2. Diego Cruz; (Apoy Hiking Society)	1. Nico Caramoan; (It's Just a Little Cash)	4. Divine Grace Reyes; (Jowa Albert)	5. Clarisse Tadiaque; (Brush ng Bayan)	3. Justiel Ashly Torres; It's Bouquet to Not be Bouquet
98	July 7, 2024	Pamilya Sagrado cast (Tirso Cruz III and Grae Fernandez)	2. Beverly Cielos; (Thread Madela)	4. John Lloyd Capacio; (Gossip ko'y Litong-lito)	1. Donabelle Arce; (Shawie-tin Mo at Isasayaw Ko)	5. Mercy Grace Tomboc; (Kumot and Get Me)	3. Jan Sherwin Estomaguio; Sale-amin, Sale-amin
99	July 13, 2024	Cup of Joe	3. Irene Imperial; (Matcha Matcha Man)	2. Oliver Agustin; (Joshua Gas-cia)	4. Jerome Coluso; (White Piolo Shirt)	5. Rose; (I'm File. Thank You!)	1. Jhay-r Garcia; Theft Curry
100	July 14, 2024	Wrive	5. Sarah Mae; (Don't be Sili)	1. John Patrick Latorre; (Fan-tropiko)	3. Grace Oneja; (Bawang na Pag-ibig)	4. Jessa Marie Martinez; (Guy and Tip)	2. Tyron Montero; A-record Mambo!

=== SING-vestigators ===
Legend:
Regular SING-vestigator
Additional SING-vestigator
Guest SING-vestigator

Apps		Panelists in attendance (Sorted by first appearance, with episode designations)
g#	p#	Panelists in attendance (Sorted by first appearance, with episode designations)
100	1	Bayani Agbayani (1–100)
85	2	Angeline Quinto (1–34, 37–47, 49, 51–55, 57–66, 69, 71, 74, 76–82, 84, 86, 88–89, 91–99); MC Muah (1–13, 19–22, 24–42, 44, 46–54, 56–63, 65–73, 75, 78–84, 86, 88–100)
84	1	Lassy (1–13, 19–22, 24–42, 44, 46–58, 60–63, 65–73, 75, 78–86, 88–96, 98, 100)
83	1	Negi (1–24, 26–27, 29–45, 53–55, 57–63, 67–83, 85, 87, 90–100)
67	1	Long Mejia (1–6, 14–27, 29–37, 40–45, 53–55, 57–58, 60–69, 71, 73–74, 76–79, 81–83, 85, 87, 90, 97–100)
16	1	Divine Tetay (43, 45, 56, 59, 64–66, 70–72, 74–77, 80, 97, 99)
13	2	Chad Kinis (43, 45–46, 48–50, 84, 86, 88–90, 93–94); Jennica Garcia (56, 64, 67–68, 70, 72–77, 85, 87)
11	1	Alora Sasam (9–18, 23)
5	2	Lucas Garcia (83–84, 86, 88–89); Petite (91–92, 95–96, 100)
4	1	Donita Nose (46, 48, 51–52)
3	1	Iyah Mina (17–18, 23)
2	3	Donnalyn Bartolome (14–15); Anji Salvacion (35–36); Lorraine Galvez (48, 85)
1	4	Eian Rances (28); Pops Fernandez (47); Ana Ramsey (50); Shanaia Gomez (87)
