= Anjo Sarnate =

Filipino singer (born 2002)

- Born: Anjo Ferdinand Sarnate; May 28, 2002 (age 24); Quezon, Philippines
- Genres: OPM; K-pop; pop
- Occupation: Singer
- Instrument: Vocals
- Years active: 2019–present
- Website: Anjo Sarnate website

Anjo Ferdinand Sarnate (born May 28, 2002), also known as Anjo, is a Filipino singer. He is known for his participation in Dream Maker, a Filipino-South Korean boy group survival reality show produced by ABS-CBN Entertainment, MLD Entertainment, and KAMP Global.

== Early life and education ==
Anjo Sarnate was born in Lucena City, Quezon, Philippines on May 28, 2000. Since his younger years, he was already exposed to music that he came to love singing. He stated: "I started singing for fun but then I realized that music can do more, it creates a deep emotional bond with the singer and the audience." At 9, he started to pursue his singing career, joining the choir and various amateur singing contests. At 10, he was offered a scholarship at a local music school in Lucena City. At an early age, he started competing in various singing competitions. He also joined NAMCYA (National Music Competition for Young Artists) for several years.

He graduated with a Bachelor of Science in Hospitality Management from St. Anne College of Lucena, Inc. in 2024.

After earning his Bachelor's degree in Hospitality Management, Anjo Sarnate shifted his focus and is now pursuing a Bachelor's Degree in Music Business Management at MINT College.

== Career ==
=== Singing Competitions ===
Sarnate joined the first season of It's Showtime's segment "Tawag ng Tanghalan" with his rendition of "Minsan Lang Kitang Iibigin". and came back in its fifth season and became a weekly winner. In 2020, Anjo also became a "mystery singer" on the third season of I Can See Your Voice.

In 2019, he participated the 17th Karaoke World Championships held in Kanda Myojin Shrine, Tokyo, alongside other 43 finalists. He finished as one of the grand finalist and won the Viewers' Choice Award with his rendition of Celine Dion's "My Heart Will Go On". He also represented the Philippines at the 25th World Championships of Performing Arts (WCOPA) in Anaheim, California, and earned 6 bronze medals.

Anjo Sarnate, fresh off his appearance on the show "Dream Maker," represented the Philippines at the International Karaoke Federation's Karaoke Cup held in Las Vegas, Nevada, USA in 2023. He finished 9th out of 70 contestants, just missing a spot in the grand finals.

=== Dream Maker ===
In 2022, Sarnate participated in Dream Maker, a reality competition show broadcast on ABS-CBN which produces a boy band from a field of 62 contestants. He stayed until the 4th ranking announcement and placed 26th.

Dream Maker results: Mentor's Evaluation: Rank 55 out of 62 Dream Chasers Mission 1: Rank 25 out of 44 Dream Chasers Mission 2: Rank 8 out of 28 Dream Chasers Mission 3: Rank 26 out of 28 Dream Chasers.

Music Industry

Anjo Sarnate remains active in the music scene, having released three songs through WYL Music.

"Nothing At All" (2021)

"Loved By You" (2023)

"Stay With You" (2025)

== Filmography ==
=== Television ===
| Year | Title | Role | Notes |
|---|---|---|---|
| 2012 | Walang Tulugan with the Master Showman | as a guest performer | |
| 2016 | It's Showtime: Tawag ng Tanghalan | as a contestant | Season 1 (Daily Contender) |
| 2020 | I Can See Your Voice | as a contestant | Season 3 (Mystery Singer) |
| 2021 | It's Showtime: Tawag ng Tanghalan | as a contestant | Season 5 (Weekly Finalist) |
| 2022–23 | Dream Maker | as a contestant | Semi-Finalist |
| 2024 | iWant ASAP | as a guest performer | |
| 2025 | GMA 7's Sing-Kilig | as a contestant | |
| 2025 | Net25's Kada Umaga | as a guest performer | |

== Accolades ==
| Year | Award Ceremony | Award | Ref. |
|---|---|---|---|
| 2019 | Karaoke World Championships (Asia) | Silver Awardee | |
| 2019 | Karaoke World Championships (World) | Grand Finalist / Viewer's Choice Award | |
| 2022 | World Championships of Performing Arts - WCOPA (USA) | Bronze Multi Medalist | |
| 2023 | IKF Karaoke Cup (USA) | Semi-Finalist | |
