= I Can See Your Voice (Philippine game show) season 3 =

Television game show season

I Can See Your Voice
- Season 3
- Starring: Andrew E.; Long Mejia; Negi; Nikko Natividad; Angeline Quinto; Jona Viray; KaladKaren
- Hosted by: Luis Manzano
- Winners: Good singers: 14; Bad singers: 11
- No. of episodes: 25

Release
- Original network: Kapamilya Channel; A2Z (simulcast)
- Original release: October 24, 2020 – February 7, 2021

Season chronology
- ← Previous; Season 2 (on ABS-CBN) Next → Season 4

The third season of the Philippine television mystery music game show I Can See Your Voice premiered on Kapamilya Channel and A2Z on October 24, 2020.

At the time of filming during the COVID-19 pandemic, health and safety protocols are also implemented.

== Gameplay ==
=== Format ===
According to the original South Korean rules, the guest artist(s) must attempt to eliminate bad singers during its game phase. At the final performance, the last remaining mystery singer is revealed as either good or bad by means of a duet between them and one of the guest artists. (Note: Gameplay notes: The number of mystery singers are set to five (for the rest of the season) or six (eps. 7 and 16).; The Everybody Sync! round may perform through a batch of trios or pairs (in a lip sync battle against each other).)

At the end of each round, an eliminated mystery singer gets a consolation prize starting from ₱5,000 (for the first round), ₱10,000 (for the second round), to ₱15,000 (for the third round). If the last remaining mystery singer is good, the guest artist(s) receive an Eye-ward trophy. The winning mystery singer, regardless of being good (SEE-nger) or bad (SEE-ntunado), gets ₱25,000.

=== Rounds ===
1. Everybody Sync
  The mystery singers are divided into batches, and each of them would have to perform lip sync individually.
2. Two or False
  Each mystery singer is given two different identities as a good and bad singer, with one of them is a real identity.
3. Play it by Hear
  Three random panelists are wearing headphones to listen to a recording of assigned mystery singer that lasts for 15 seconds. Afterward, the panelist defends the mystery singer and convince the guest artist to choose them for a final performance.

== Episodes ==
=== Guest artists ===
Legend:
Good singer
Bad singer

2020 games
Episode		Guest artist (Note: Players' notes: For the returning guest artists (who also include foreigners and former good singers), names are displayed in italics.; For the mixed groups, names who identified as bad singers are displayed in italics.)	SEE-cret songers (In their respective numbers and aliases)					
#	Date	Guest artist	Elimination order					Winner
#	Date	Guest artist	Everybody Sync	Two or False		Play it by Hear		Winner
1	October 24, 2020	Nina	5. Francisco Zamora; (Beef Paypay-itan)	2. Edgar Allan Tejada; (5, 6, 7, Straight)		3. Joevarry Gigantone; (Jog and Jill)	1. Verce Vercelles; (Apat, Lima, Tanim)	4. Aimee Sambajon; Pork Call-dereta
2	October 25, 2020	Jona Viray	3. Reymark Mena; (Love Thai Woman)	4. John Kim Vergel; (Rep, Rep, Rep, Right, Rep)		2. Rhon Labor Caimbon; (Host! Host! Host! Merry Christmas!)	1. Joanna Marie Castillo; (Kuko Kuti-kutitap)	5. Clint Catalan; Cherry Fine Picache
3	October 31, 2020	Janine Berdin	5. Anjo Sarnate; (100 Days to Heavy)	1. Antonio Javier; (The Sorry of my Life)		2. Rhyzza Nicole Kafilas; (Tsina Natuto)	3. Bong Tagulao; (O-gay Alcasid)	4. Lobert Abobo; May Vocals Pa
4	November 1, 2020	Jed Madela	2. Paulo Alforque; (Knocks Me of My Pet)	5. Edwin Gregorio, Jr.; (Puro na Lang ako, Oo I.T.!)		4. Redmund Mandanas; (Prof. the Magic Dragon)	1. Queenie Gumiran; (Jameson Break)	3. Jherome Alias; Maginoo Pero Medyas Bastos
5	November 7, 2020	Jason Dy	2. Danny Geraldo; (Mix Minchin)	3. Jerald Fajardo; (Wow. Yaman. Botika Pa!)		1. Mark Angelo Aldaba; (Iñigo Pasyal)	4. Eufritz Santos; (Crazy Little Thing Called Live)	5. Jeya Mestre; I Thought Aso a Pussy Cat
6	November 8, 2020	Jaya	3. Mitzi Negado; (Draw Barrymore)	4. Nica Pauline Llamelo; (Punch-it Canton)		1. Ruth Fauste; (Walang Seawoman ang Namamatay)	2. Lester David; (Scene of the Prime Operatives)	5. Aicey Jadulco; Maging Sino ka Mask
7 (Note: These two episodes were initially scheduled to air for its 2nd season as they already finished production before the COVID-19 pandemic.)	November 14, 2020	Donnalyn Bartolome	2. Roleth de Leon; (Let's go Baby! Kahon!)	4. Jovanie Secuya; (Shy Bright Like a Diamond)	6. Bernard Vios; (Sargo de Konsensya)	5. Raffy Espiña; (Bike-kit Ngayon ka Lang)	3. Berlyn Llanes; (Total Eclipse of the Art)	1. Omar Bucayon; I Did it my Wait
8	November 15, 2020	Randy Santiago	1. John Edward Salvador; (Jersey J)	4. Jay-ar Caluag; (Renta Avila)		5. Princess Verejano; (PPE Smith)	2. Pedro Gudez, Jr.; (Keyk-o Matsing)	3. Katrin Donato; Record Yap
9	November 21, 2020	KZ Tandingan	5. Maribor Vergara; (Agent Export 4)	3. Mark Junel Tauyan; (Diez-ebel)		1. Jeremy Manite; (Pera o Bio?)	4. Barbie Ocon; (Bend Tumbling)	2. Joel Yapit; Tawag ng Tangha-run
10	November 22, 2020	Zsa Zsa Padilla	3. Kiezl Perez; (Ano Bun Naman?!)	1. Marian Powers; (Sushi's a Jolly Good Fellow)		5. Beverly Eneluna; (Kahit may Mahal ka Nang Abba)	2. Care Marcos; (Sana Ngayong Spa-sko)	4. Laurence Tumabini; Mahirap ba 'Yung Test? Hindi. Middle East Lang!
11	November 28, 2020	Martin Nievera	2. Sean Villagonzalo; (Beef There's a Will, There's a Way)	3. Khalil Tambio; (Slippery When Weight)		1. Jocelito Lualhati; (She Gloves me, She Gloves me Not)	5. Edmerson Valenciano; (Four Sisters and a Weighing)	4. Khali Empleo; Glutang Itim
12	November 29, 2020	Elha Nympha and Jeremy Glinoga	2. Axel Cruz; (Supot mga Kapatid!)	3. Romnick Borja; (Starting Ube Again)		1. Arjohn Enriquez; (Si Film-on, Si Film-on)	4. Jaycee Candelario; (I Lab You Goodbye)	5. Paolo Sagana; Shield's Dating a Gangster
13	December 5, 2020	Jovit Baldivino and Marcelito Pomoy	5. Marivic Guelas; (Cook Maibabalik ko Lang)	3. Maria Rodriguez; (Hindi Tayo Pedi)		4. Abby Gruezo; (Basta't Pajama Kita)	2. Jan Echivarria; (When I Cebu Smile)	1. Lars Delariman; Judge Got Lucky
14	December 6, 2020	Iñigo Pascual	3. Michael Santiago; (David Poster)	5. Aldie Javier; (Turon-to, Canada)		2. Jacqueline Nogara; (Egg Sheeran)	4. John Art Apostol; (Lamayan de Oro)	1. Jazzne Kier Labay; Tulong Mejia
15	December 12, 2020	Smokey Mountain (Note: Season highlights: Smokey Mountain (ep. 15) designated as new players, which include members Jeffrey Hidalgo and the returning Geneva Cruz.; As a group, MNL48 (ep. 23) has a different lineup with the following members playing on their games: Team M: Jamie Alberto, Sheki Arzaga, Alice de Leon, and Laney Sañosa Team N: Abby Trinidad, Coleen Trinidad, and Jaydee Villaruel Team L: Gabb Skribikin)	5. Alexander Santoso; (Nari-tour Ako)	3. Joey Piñera; (Hangin ka na Lang)		4. Felipe Mendoza, Jr.; (April Tayo! Sumakit ang Ulo Ko)	2. Jasmine Sangel; (Shampoo Mga Daliri)	1. Chelsea Castro; Teach-siritsit Alibangbang
16	December 13, 2020	Barbie Almalbis and Martin Honasan (Note: Despite not singing, they were still counted as guest artists.)	4. Dan Casinao; (Vocs to the Future)	2. Danilo Amparo; (Shirley Shells)	5. Jennicar Binos; (Honey my Love so Sweep)	1. Jessa Manicad; (Mr. Scoop-ido)	6. Lloydie Adamero; (Libro Lang Mangarap)	3. Neo dela Cruz; Asia's Song-third
17	December 19, 2020	Maymay Entrata	3. Zaragine Capalad; (Maghihintay pa Rin at A-asap)	2. Raymart Gedorio; (Dagdag Ka-ulam-an)		4. Ace Tungcab; (Hong Kong sa Dulo ng Walang Hanggan)	1. Aira Marie Gozum; (Sa Crush-room, May Batas)	5. Cheryl Amorin; Sa Egypt Ko'y Yakap ka Pa
Season break: December 20 episode was pre-empted to give way for the airing of Ikaw ang Liwanag at Ligaya: 2020 ABS-CBN Christmas Special.

2021 games
Episode		Guest artist	SEE-cret songers (In their respective numbers and aliases)				
#	Date	Guest artist	Elimination order				Winner
#	Date	Guest artist	Everybody Sync	Two or False	Play it by Hear		Winner
18	January 9, 2021	Jamie Rivera	3. Carl Joseph Santillan; (Dito Band)	5. Ghio Flores; (Dealer Ikaw)	1. Arvin Misalang; (Repair-ting for Duty, Sir!)	2. Kara David; (Happy Sanib-ersary)	4. Benjie Quillopo; Bakit ang Sabit mo'y Binata Ka?
19	January 10, 2021	Jay R	3. Christian Jay Abria; (Parol Banawa)	4. Ian Hermogenes; (Judy Hand Santos)	1. John Rico Fernandez; (Santa Cost is Coming to Town)	5. Efrille Canonigo; (Lito Lapit)	2. Jeremio Llamas; Mascot na Sinta Ko
20	January 16, 2021	Agot Isidro	5. Laarni Davidon; (Wag Junk! May Kiliti ako Diyan!)	3. Arrold Marpa; (Humanap ka ng Pageant)	4. Princess Aycardo; (Piano ang Puso Ko)	1. Heart Mae Perez; (Come What Maid)	2. Caroline Pareño; Toda Fire
21	January 17, 2021	Nyoy Volante and Bituin Escalante	2. Rocelio Abarro; (Beauty nga Sa'yo)	4. Janica Reloxe; (Chicks, Seven, Eight)	1. Vasha Kawasaki; (Agad-agad?! Pwede ba, Waste Lang?!)	5. Reyn Avreny Reside; (Ikaanim, Ikapito, Equal-o)	3. Allan Besillas; Masakit Ba? Ice ka Lang?
22	January 23, 2021	Mitoy Yonting and Klarisse de Guzman	3. Renzo Reyes; (Kulong ng Palad)	4. Billy Joe Dulap; (Ang sa Ayos ay Akin)	1. Dennis Alcantara, Jr.; (Bag! Bag! Into the Room)	2. Marc Gil Mateo; (Highway to Health)	5. Charles Molaco; Sana Dalawa ang Pusa Ko
23	January 24, 2021	MNL48	1. Elijah Velandrez; (Banana Bang Pag-ibig)	4. Renz Dizon; (Sash-akyan Kita)	2. Arjay Laylo; (Voice Don't Cry)	3. Maja Kubrador; (Twinkle, Twinkle, Little Store)	5. Albert Yadao; Tinda Will Always Love You
24	February 6, 2021	Ogie Alcasid	1. Jonathan Naval; (Cook Ako na Lang Sana)	4. Jude Martinez; (Ka-train Bernardo)	3. Johndel Cartaño; (I Gatas Feeling)	5. Jeraldy Rivera; (KaladKaren-deria)	2. John Dexter Batino; You Ain't Nothin' But a Hotdog
25	February 7, 2021	Regine Velasquez	3. Leoniza Lopos; (Ghost the Distance)	4. Benedict Doble; (Mask Marami, Mask Masaya)	1. Annabelle Agoncillo; (Put Your Head on my Soldier)	2. Leo John Guinid; (If I Were Apoy)	5. Kenneth Estrada; Oops... Tsek-a Lang!

=== SING-vestigators ===
Legend:
Regular SING-vestigator
Additional SING-vestigator
Guest SING-vestigator

Apps		Panelists in attendance (Sorted by first appearance, with episode designations)
g#	p#	Panelists in attendance (Sorted by first appearance, with episode designations)
23	2	Long Mejia and Negi (1–6, 8–15, 17–25)
22	1	Andrew E. (1–22)
20	1	KaladKaren (1–6, 8–15, 17–22)
18	1	Nikko Natividad (3–4, 8–15, 17–22, 24–25)
15	1	Jona Viray (8–15, 17–23)
11	1	Angeline Quinto (1–7, 16, 23–25)
4	1	Eric Nicolas (1–2, 5–6)
3	2	Brenda Mage and Jolina Magdangal (23–25)
2	4	Bayani Agbayani, Jobert Austria, Wacky Kiray, and Alex Gonzaga (7, 16)
