= I Can See Your Voice (Philippine game show) =

Philippine television game show

- Genre: Game show
- Based on: I Can See Your Voice by CJ ENM
- Written by: Paolo Rivera
- Directed by: Jon Raymond Moll (1–3); Edwin Manese (2); Joane Laygo (4–5); Jay Klio Bermudez (5); Alco Guerrero (5)
- Creative director: Stiffany Adanza
- Presented by: Luis Manzano
- Starring: The SING-vestigators (see cast)
- Country of origin: Philippines
- Original language: Filipino
- No. of seasons: 5
- No. of episodes: Regular: 307; Special: 7; Overall: 314

Production
- Executive producers: Luis Andrada; Rose Casala; Laurenti Dyogi; Marvi Gelito; Carlo Katigbak; Cory Vidanes
- Producers: Erika Amatorio; Abigail Apostol; Paulene Kazel Berdan; Mira Faith Cagulada; Odie Jose; Danilo Tiongson, Jr.; Rohini Dasi Vergara
- Editors: Jan Balinquit; Jonathan Lapuz; Joeffrey Tan
- Camera setup: Multi-camera
- Production company: ABS-CBN Studios

Original release
- Network: ABS-CBN
- Release: September 16, 2017 – March 14, 2020
- Network: Kapamilya Channel (Note: In between 3rd and 5th seasons, the show mainly aired on Kapamilya Channel, with simulcasts on A2Z (from October 10, 2024) and TV5 (from March 11, 2023). (Note: The 5th season began airing on Kapamilya Channel and A2Z at episode 1 on March 4, 2023, followed by TV5 at episode 2 on March 11, 2023. However, some episodes are also delayed during PBA games.))
- Release: October 24, 2020 – July 14, 2024

Related
- I Can See Your Voice franchise

I Can See Your Voice is a Philippine television mystery music game show broadcast by ABS-CBN and Kapamilya Channel, based on the South Korean program of the same title, featuring its format where guest artist(s) attempt to eliminate bad singers from the group, until the last mystery singer remains for a duet performance. Hosted by Luis Manzano, it first aired on September 16, 2017.

== Gameplay ==
=== Format ===
Over the course of three rounds, the guest artist(s) must attempt to eliminate bad singers from a group of "mystery singers" (dubbed as SEE-cret songers), identified only by their occupation or alias, without ever hearing them perform live. They are assisted by clues regarding the singers' backgrounds, style of performance, and observations from a celebrity panel (dubbed as SING-vestigators). At the end of a game, the last remaining mystery singer is revealed as either good or bad by means of a duet between them and one of the guest artists. (Note: Gameplay notes: The number of mystery singers are set to five (from 3rd to 5th season) or six (from 1st to 2nd season).; The number of rounds are set to three.; During the 1st season, Sync Zoned and Play It By Hear rounds are subsequently introduced.; The Everybody Sync! round may perform through a batch of trios or pairs (in a lip sync battle against each other).; Since the introduction of Clues Open in the 3rd season, three out of ten rotating segments are conducted throughout the round.)

At the end of each round, an eliminated mystery singer gets a consolation prize starting from ₱5,000 (for the first round), ₱10,000 (for the second round), to ₱15,000 (for the third round). If the last remaining mystery singer is good, the guest artist(s) receive a trophy (dubbed as Eye-ward). The winning mystery singer, regardless of being good (SEE-nger) or bad (SEE-ntunado), gets ₱25,000.

- In the first season, the winning good singer is granted to perform again as a contestant in Tawag ng Tanghalan.

=== Rounds ===
==== Visual rounds ====
- Stop, Looks, and Listen

s1: The guest artist is given some time to observe and examine each mystery singer based on their appearance. Afterward, a muted video of each mystery singer reveals only 0.3 seconds of their singing voice as an additional hint.

- Two or False

s2–5: Each mystery singer is given two different identities as a good and bad singer, with one of them is a real identity.

==== Lip sync rounds ====
- The Voice is Syncing

s1–2: Each mystery singer performs a lip sync to a song; good singers mime to a recording of their own, while bad singers mime to a backing track by another vocalist.

- Sync Zoned

s1 ep. 99: Each mystery singer performs a lip sync from a non-lyrical piece of a song (i.e. humming, screaming, whistling, etc.).

- Everybody Sync!

s2–5: The mystery singers are divided into batches, and each of them would have to perform lip sync individually.

==== Evidence rounds ====
- I Like to Prove It! Prove It!

s1: A proof of each mystery singer's singing ability (i.e. photo, video, certificates, etc.) is shown on the screen. Good singers have own evidences, while bad singers have their evidences fabricated.

- Clues Open

s4–5: The host has randomly assigned clues about the mystery singer, and then the guest artist must choose a clue for each one.

Introduced in the fourth season:
- A Whole New Word — The panelist is given a statement with an assigned "keyword" to one of the remaining mystery singers. Good singers have true statements, while bad singers have their statements fabricated.
- Bed of Boses — Similar to a muted video segment of Stop, Looks, and Listen, a video recording from a studio session by one of the remaining mystery singers reveal only 0.3 seconds of their singing voice as an additional hint.
- Message Parlor — The guest artist is presented with a video package featuring a "super fan" by one of the remaining mystery singers.
- Song Ka Pa — The host reveals a playlist of three "mystery songs" that are appropriated to one of the remaining mystery singers.
- Tabi-tabi Po — The guest artist asks a question to one of the remaining mystery singers that can answer with non-verbal communication.

Introduced in the fifth season:
- Ano Box? — Inside a semi-concealed container, the panelist must release an evidential piece by one of the remaining mystery singers, except music-related items (i.e. ballpen, hairbrush, flashlight, etc.).
- Good Night Silip — The guest artist is presented with a preshow rehearsal video by one of the remaining mystery singers.
- Hula Bira and Shape, Rattle, and Roll — The panelist has to make its own premonition by one of the remaining mystery singers. Good singers have true statements, while bad singers have their statements fabricated.
- Lights, Camera, Reaction — The guest artist is presented with a video package including witnesses reacting to one of the remaining mystery singers when they hear on its own performance that would appear on the show.
- Stop, Spluk, and Listen — The guest artist must interrogate to one of the remaining mystery singers by audio message, but pitch-shifted to obscure their actual vocals.

==== Rehearsal round ====
- Play it by Hear

s1–3: Three random panelists are wearing headphones to listen to a recording of assigned mystery singer that lasts for 15 seconds. Afterward, the panelist defends the mystery singer and convince the guest artist to choose them for a final performance.

== Production ==
BNT News provisionally announced a Philippine adaptation of I Can See Your Voice at the time when (South Korean) second season of the same title premiered on October 22, 2015; this was subsequently confirmed by ABS-CBN Corporation and Endemol Shine Group in August 2017, with the in-house ABS-CBN Studios assigning on production duties.

== Broadcast history ==
=== ABS-CBN ===
I Can See Your Voice debuted on September 16, 2017, as a replacement to Lethal Weapon, (Note: The 1st season has originally scheduled to air for 26 episodes (at 13 weeks), with Moira Dela Torre playing on its tentative [26th episode] finale on December 10, 2017. Due to "unprecedented high ratings", it was later added by 102 episodes (at 54 weeks) until the formal conclusion on January 6, 2019.) with filming taking place at ABS-CBN Broadcasting Center in Quezon City. As part of the show's first anniversary, a highlight special (subtitled Best Mode) was aired on September 9, 2018. Other games that have played include Daniel Padilla playing on entire Kalokalike alumni as mystery singers on September 15, 2018, TNT Boys in a celebrity special on September 16, 2018, Marcelito Pomoy in the pairs special (subtitled Iba Two!) on September 29, 2018, and TJ Monterde and KZ Tandingan in the groups special on December 22, 2018.

A second season premiered on August 10, 2019. Other games that have played include Doris Bigornia in the seniors special on December 14, 2019, and Ethel Booba in the foreigners special on December 28, 2019. Due to halting of production amidst the COVID-19 pandemic, as well as the second shutdown of broadcasting on May 5, 2020, it was prematurely ended on March 14, 2020, making it the last season to air on ABS-CBN.

=== Kapamilya Channel ===
I Can See Your Voice made its move to Kapamilya Channel and A2Z, which began airing the third season on October 24, 2020, also coinciding the debut of TV5's rival show Masked Singer Pilipinas. At that time during the COVID-19 pandemic, ABS-CBN resumed production of the show since then until the fourth season, with health and safety protocols implemented.

During its upfronts presented at a Christmas special in December 2021, ABS-CBN renewed the series for a fourth season. Originally scheduled to premiere on January 8, 2022, it was suddenly occupied by a replay of 1MX Manila 2021 in its timeslot instead, and then pushed back later to January 15, 2022; this also conducted an in-game event I Can Guess Your Voice since then until the fifth season. Also at the similar event in December 2022, ABS-CBN renewed the series for a fifth season, which first premiered on both Kapamilya Channel and A2Z on March 4, 2023, followed by its airing debut on TV5 on March 11, 2023.

== Cast ==
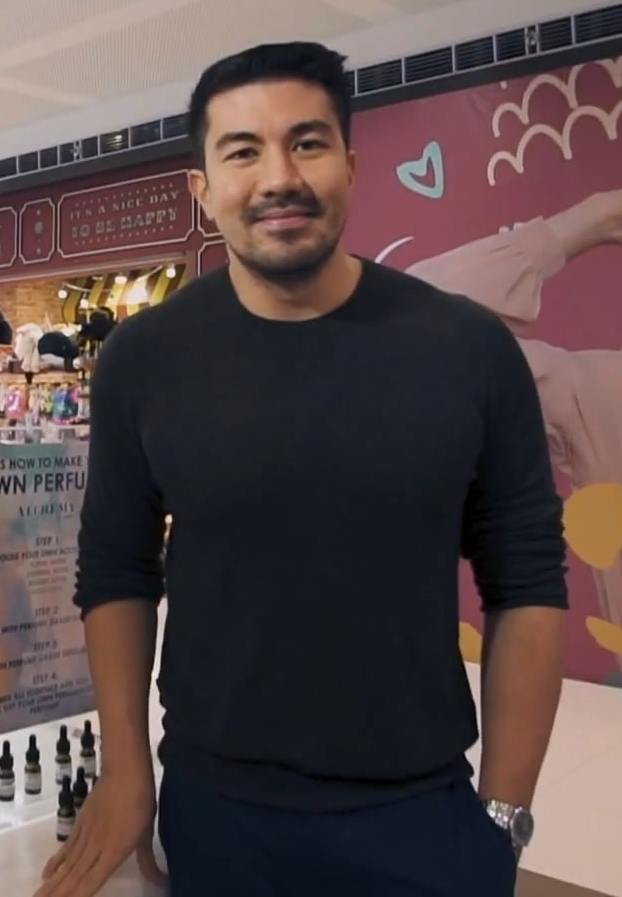
Luis Manzano served as a host.

The series employs a panel of celebrity "detectives" (dubbed as SING-vestigators and Sing of the Crime Operatives) who assist the guest artists in identifying good and bad mystery singers throughout the game. Along with regular members, guest panelists also appear since the first season. Overall, 19 celebrities have served as panelists, with their original lineup consisting of Wacky Kiray, Kean Cipriano, Alex Gonzaga, Andrew E., and Angeline Quinto. Later members who joined the group's duties also include Bayani Agbayani, KaladKaren — from the 1st season; Jobert Austria from the 2nd season; Long Mejia, Negi, Nikko Natividad, Jona Viray — from the 3rd season; MC Muah, Ruffa Gutierrez, Lassy — from the 4th season; Chad Kinis, Jennica Garcia, Divine Tetay, and Alora Sasam — from the 5th season.

Designations:
Main cast member	H Hosting duties
Additional cast member	g# Total games attended, by panelists

Cast member	Seasons				
Cast member	1	2	3	4	5
Luis Manzano	H	H	H	H	H
Bayani Agbayani	113	28	2 (Note: Panelists' notes: For its 3rd season, episodes 7 (with Donnalyn Bartolome) and 16 (with Barbie Almalbis and Martin Honasan) were supposedly to be included in the 2nd season, before finally airing on November 14 and December 13, 2020, with both games have already finished production before the COVID-19 pandemic.; In the 4th season, Klarisse de Guzman was initially to be included as a SING-vestigator, until she was replaced by Quinto.)		100
Wacky Kiray	119	32	2		
Kean Cipriano	113	11			
Alex Gonzaga	114	31	2		
Andrew E.	110	31	22		
Angeline Quinto	110	12	11	12	85
KaladKaren	11	13	20		
Jobert Austria		14	2		
Long Mejia			23		67
Negi			23	29	83
Nikko Natividad			18	27	
Jona Viray			15		
MC Muah				26	85
Ruffa Gutierrez				10	
Lassy				29	84
Chad Kinis					13
Jennica Garcia					13
Divine Tetay					16
Alora Sasam					11

== Series overview ==
Season	Episodes	Originally released			Good singers	Bad singers
Season	Episodes	First released	Last released	Network	Good singers	Bad singers
1	123	September 16, 2017	January 6, 2019	ABS-CBN	70	52
2	30	August 10, 2019	March 14, 2020	ABS-CBN	18	12
3	25	October 24, 2020	February 7, 2021	Kapamilya Channel	14	11
4	29	January 15, 2022	June 19, 2022	Kapamilya Channel	13	16
5	100	March 4, 2023	July 14, 2024	Kapamilya Channel	49	51
Sp	7	September 9, 2018	December 28, 2019	—N/a	4	3

== Accolades ==
Event	Year (Note: Indicates the year of ceremony)	Category	Nominee(s)	Result	Ref(s)
Alta Media Icon Awards	2018	Best TV Game Show	I Can See Your Voice	Won	
Alta Media Icon Awards	2019	Best Game Show	I Can See Your Voice	Won	
Alta Media Icon Awards	2019	Best Game Show Host	Luis Manzano	Won	
Aral Parangal Awards	2018	Best TV Game Show	I Can See Your Voice	Won	
Aral Parangal Awards	2018	Best Male TV Game Show Host	Luis Manzano	Won	
Box Office Entertainment Awards	2018	Most Popular TV Program for Talent Search, Reality, Talk and Game Show	I Can See Your Voice	Won	
Box Office Entertainment Awards	2019	Most Popular TV Program for Talent Search, Reality, Talk and Game Show	I Can See Your Voice	Won	
Box Office Entertainment Awards	2019	Male TV Host of the Year	Luis Manzano	Won	
Catholic Mass Media Awards	2018	Best Entertainment Program	I Can See Your Voice	Won	
EdukCircle Awards	2018	Best Game Show Host	Luis Manzano	Won	
EdukCircle Awards	2019	Hall of Famer Inductee for a Game Show Host	Luis Manzano	Won	
EdukCircle Awards	2019	Best Male Variety Show Host	Luis Manzano	Won	
Gawad Lasallianeta Awards	2020	Most Outstanding Game Show on TV	I Can See Your Voice	Won	
Gawad Lasallianeta Awards	2020	Most Outstanding Game Show Host	Luis Manzano	Won	
Gawad Lasallianeta Awards	2020	Green Zeal Award for Excellence as Lasallian Public Communicators Awardee	Luis Manzano	Won	
GEMS Hiyas ng Sining Awards	2018	Best TV Host for Reality or Talent Program	Luis Manzano	Won	
GEMS Hiyas ng Sining Awards	2018	Best TV Program	I Can See Your Voice	Won	
GEMS Hiyas ng Sining Awards	2021	Best TV Host for Reality or Talent Program	Luis Manzano	Won	
Illumine Innovative Awards for Television	2017	Most Innovative TV Game Show	I Can See Your Voice	Won	
Jeepney TV Fan Favorite Awards	2022	Favorite Game/Reality Show	I Can See Your Voice	Nominated	
Jeepney TV Fan Favorite Awards	2022	Favorite Game/Reality Show Host	Luis Manzano	Nominated	
KBP Golden Dove Awards	2018	Most Outstanding Variety Show	I Can See Your Voice	Nominated	
Laurus Nobilis Media Excellence Awards	2024	Media Excellence in Entertainment Program (Male) Hosting	Luis Manzano	Won	
LionhearTV RAWR Awards	2022	Favorite Host	Luis Manzano	Nominated	
LionhearTV RAWR Awards	2023	Favorite TV Host	Luis Manzano	Nominated	
Mabini Media Awards	2018	Best Entertainment Program	I Can See Your Voice	Won	
PMPC Star Awards for Television	2018	Best Talent Show Host	Luis Manzano	Won	
PMPC Star Awards for Television	2021	Best Talent Search Program Host	Luis Manzano	Won	
Platinum Stallion Media Awards	2018	Best Game Show	I Can See Your Voice	Won	
Platinum Stallion Media Awards	2018	Best Game Show Host	Luis Manzano	Won	
Platinum Stallion Media Awards	2019	Best Game Show	I Can See Your Voice	Won	
Platinum Stallion Media Awards	2019	Best Game Show Host	Luis Manzano	Won	
UmalohokJUAN Media Awards	2018	Male Host of the Year	Luis Manzano	Won	

== See also ==
- Catalogs:
  - List of programs broadcast by ABS-CBN
    - List of programs distributed by ABS-CBN Studios
  - List of A2Z (TV channel) original programming
  - List of Kapamilya Channel original programming
    - List of Kapamilya Online Live original programming
  - List of TV5 (Philippine TV network) original programming
- Show-related article:
  - Tawag ng Tanghalan — a segment of the noon time program It's Showtime
