= Kiddie Kwela =

- Genre: Children's show
- Created by: Perci Intalan
- Developed by: MPB Primedia, Inc.
- Directed by: Erick dela Cruz
- Presented by: Bayani Agbayani
- Country of origin: Philippines
- Original language: Filipino
- No. of episodes: 71

Production
- Running time: 30 minutes

Original release
- Network: TV5
- Release: November 25, 2008 – March 30, 2010

Kiddie Kwela is a Philippine television educational show broadcast TV5. Hosted by Bayani Agbayani, it aired from November 25, 2008 to March 30, 2010, replacing 3R (Respect, Relax, Respond) and was replaced by the Tuesday slot of Wow Mali.

== See also ==
- List of TV5 original programming
