= I Can See Your Voice (Philippine game show) season 1 =

Television game show season

I Can See Your Voice
- Season 1
- Starring: Bayani Agbayani; Wacky Kiray; Kean Cipriano; Alex Gonzaga; Andrew E.; Angeline Quinto; KaladKaren
- Hosted by: Luis Manzano
- Winners: Good singers: 73; Bad singers: 54
- No. of episodes: Regular: 123; Special: 5; Overall: 128

Release
- Original network: ABS-CBN
- Original release: September 16, 2017 – January 6, 2019

Season chronology
- Next → Season 2

The first season of the Philippine television mystery music game show I Can See Your Voice premiered on ABS-CBN on September 16, 2017. It is also the longest-running season in ICSYV franchise by episode count, with 128. (Note: The 1st season has originally scheduled to air for 26 episodes (at 13 weeks), with Moira Dela Torre playing on its tentative [26th episode] finale on December 10, 2017. Due to "unprecedented high ratings", it was later added by 102 episodes (at 54 weeks) until the formal conclusion on January 6, 2019.)

== Gameplay ==
=== Format ===
According to the original South Korean rules, the guest artist(s) must attempt to eliminate bad singers during its game phase. At the final performance, the last remaining mystery singer is revealed as either good or bad by means of a duet between them and one of the guest artists.

At the end of each round, an eliminated mystery singer gets a consolation prize starting from ₱5,000 (for the first round), ₱10,000 (for the second round), to ₱15,000 (for the third round). If the last remaining mystery singer is good, the guest artist(s) receive an Eye-ward trophy; they are also granted to perform again as a contestant in Tawag ng Tanghalan. The winning mystery singer, regardless of being good (SEE-nger) or bad (SEE-ntunado), gets ₱25,000.

=== Rounds ===
1. Stop, Looks and Listen
  The guest artist is given some time to observe and examine each mystery singer based on their appearance. Afterward, a muted video of each mystery singer that reveals only 0.3 seconds of their singing voice is played as an additional hint.
2. 1. The Voice is Syncing
  Each mystery singer performs a lip sync to a song; good singers mime to a recording of their own, while bad singers mime to a backing track by another vocalist.
2. 2. Sync Zoned (ep. 99)
  Each mystery singer performs a lip sync from a non-lyrical piece of a song (i.e. humming, screaming, whistling, etc.).
3. 1. I Like to Prove It! Prove It! (some episodes)
  A proof of each mystery singer's singing ability (i.e. photo, video, certificates, etc.) is shown on the screen. Good singers have own evidences, while bad singers have their evidences fabricated.
3. 2. Play it by Hear (some episodes)
  Three random panelists are wearing headphones to listen to a recording of assigned mystery singer that lasts for 15 seconds. Afterward, the panelist defends the mystery singer and convince the guest artist to choose them for a final performance.

== Episodes ==
Gary Valenciano is the only guest artist to be played on both premiere and finale games. Almost an entire cast (by host Luis Manzano and SING-vestigators Wacky Kiray, Kean Cipriano, Alex Gonzaga, Andrew E., Angeline Quinto, and Bayani Agbayani) had been also played their games, except KaladKaren.

The first season did celebrate its related first anniversary (subtitled Unang Laugh-Laugh-fun), with Daniel Padilla playing on entire Kalokalike alumni. It also played the first games featuring an entire lineup of celebrities (with TNT Boys), pairs (subtitled Iba Two!; with Marcelito Pomoy), and groups (with TJ Monterde and KZ Tandingan) as mystery singers.

=== Best Mode (September 9, 2018) ===
As a prelude to the show's first anniversary, a highlight special was aired on that date, in which includes behind-the-scenes and a montage of mystery singer performances for the past 98 episodes.

I Can See Your Voice season 1 — Best Mode rankings
| Live at First Sight (Top 5 wrong eliminations) | Duet to Me One More Time (Top 5 duet performances with good singers) |
|---|---|
| 1. Tonton Leonando (Graba Siya Oh! — ep. 6); 2. RG Mia (Sport Santiago — ep. 22); 3. Erika Buensuceso (Miss Uni-verse, Refrain, Chorus — ep. 23); 4. Sephy Francisco (Tigil Patrol — ep. 9); 5. Lorelie Floren (Asya Pero 'di Kinaya — ep. 14) | 1. Christian Tugado (Ma-bandang Buhay — ep. 1); 2. Andrea Montealto (Vlogging Naroon Ka — ep. 42); 3. John Andrew Manzano (I'm Ballin' For You — ep. 27); 4. Cesar Salcedo (Don't Blues Hope — ep. 80); 5. Venisse Siy (Ikaw Foreign ang Iibigin Ko — ep. 59) |
Tono na 'To! (Bad singer ranking compilations)
| Top 5 in-game performances: 1. Andrei Osano (Tiyaga Teatro — ep. 1); 2. Sheena Ching (Daughter Ocampo — ep. 10); 3. John Raymundo (Rock-a-bae — ep. 3); 4. Vincent Corsanes (Gitara Geronimo — ep. 2); 5. John Lee Diaz (Kimchi Nadal — ep. 11) | Top 7 duet performances: 1. Jerson Balabat (Train to Bosesan — ep. 2); 2. Agnes Jolo (Guro Old With You — ep. 7); 3. Denise Rauto (Malaysia Keys — ep. 88); 4. Camille Peñaverde (Kopya, Mani, Popcorn — ep. 19); 5. Prince Castellano (Tsaa Tsaa Padilla — ep. 90); 6. Katelyn Hao (I've Benta Paradise... — ep. 70); 7. Belle Hernandez (Free-tong Hotdog — ep. 44) |

== Reception ==
| Legend: |
Highest rated episode
Lowest rated episode

| No. | Title | Air date | Timeslot (PhST) | Placement | | Rating | | Ref(s) |
| No. | Title | Air date | Timeslot (PhST) | TS | EV | Rank | Points | Ref(s) |
|---|---|---|---|---|---|---|---|---|
| 1 | "Gary Valenciano" | September 16, 2017 | Saturday, 10:00 pm | 1 | 7 | 7 | 19.5% | |
| 2 | "Ogie Alcasid" | September 17, 2017 | Sunday, 9:30 pm | 2 | 10 | 11 | 15.3% | |
| 3 | "Lea Salonga" | September 23, 2017 | Saturday, 10:00 pm | 1 | 7 | 7 | 20.1% | |
| 4 | "Lani Misalucha" | September 24, 2017 | Sunday, 9:30 pm | 2 | 8 | 8 | 16.7% | |
| 5 | "Randy Santiago" | September 30, 2017 | Saturday, 10:00 pm | 1 | 6 | 6 | 19.6% | |
| 6 | "Jolina Magdangal" | October 1, 2017 | Sunday, 9:30 pm | 1 | 6 | 6 | 18.2% | |
| 7 | "Martin Nievera" | October 7, 2017 | Saturday, 10:00 pm | 1 | 8 | 12 | 15.7% | |
| 8 | "Yeng Constantino" | October 8, 2017 | Sunday, 9:30 pm | 2 | 10 | 10 | 16.3% | |
| 9 | "Jessa Zaragoza" | October 14, 2017 | Saturday, 10:00 pm | 1 | 8 | 11 | 18.2% | |
| 10 | "Zsa Zsa Padilla" | October 15, 2017 | Sunday, 9:30 pm | 2 | 10 | 10 | 17.6% | |
| 11 | "Jed Madela" | October 21, 2017 | Saturday, 10:00 pm | 1 | 8 | 13 | 15.3% | |
| 12 | "Eva Eugenio" | October 22, 2017 | Sunday, 9:30 pm | 2 | 8 | 8 | 17.6% | |
| 13 | "Jake Zyrus" | October 28, 2017 | Saturday, 10:00 pm | 1 | 8 | 11 | 16.7% | |
| 14 | "Mike Hanopol" | October 29, 2017 | Sunday, 9:30 pm | 2 | 12 | 12 | 14.2% | |
| 15 | "APO Hiking Society" | November 4, 2017 | Saturday, 10:00 pm | 1 | 8 | 9 | 19% | |
| 16 | "KZ Tandingan" | November 5, 2017 | Sunday, 9:30 pm | 2 | 10 | 11 | 16.2% | |
| 17 | "Nina" | November 11, 2017 | Saturday, 10:00 pm | 1 | 7 | 7 | 19.3% | |
| 18 | "Jaya" | November 12, 2017 | Sunday, 9:30 pm | 2 | 10 | 10 | 15.3% | |
| 19 | "Toni Gonzaga" | November 18, 2017 | Saturday, 10:00 pm | 1 | 8 | 14 | 15.1% | |
| 20 | "Erik Santos" | November 19, 2017 | Sunday, 9:30 pm | 2 | 9 | 9 | 15.7% | |
| 21 | "Angeline Quinto" | November 25, 2017 | Saturday, 10:00 pm | 1 | 8 | 9 | 16% | |
| 22 | "Dingdong Avanzado" | November 26, 2017 | Sunday, 9:30 pm | 2 | 9 | 10 | 15% | |
| 23 | "Karla Estrada" | December 2, 2017 | Saturday, 10:00 pm | 1 | 8 | 12 | 16% | |
| 24 | "Richard Poon" | December 3, 2017 | Sunday, 9:30 pm | 2 | 10 | 12 | 13% | |
| 25 | "Jamie Rivera" | December 9, 2017 | Saturday, 10:00 pm | 1 | 7 | 7 | 18.5% | |
| 26 | "Moira Dela Torre" | December 10, 2017 | Sunday, 9:30 pm | 2 | 8 | 8 | 15.2% | |
| 27 | "Vice Ganda" | December 23, 2017 | Saturday, 10:00 pm | 1 | 6 | 6 | 19.4% | |
| 28 | "Jett Pangan" | December 24, 2017 | Sunday, 9:30 pm | 1 | 4 | 4 | 17.3% | |
| 29 | "Kyla" | December 30, 2017 | Saturday, 10:00 pm | 1 | 7 | 7 | 17.2% | |
| 30 | "Jenine Desiderio" | December 31, 2017 | Sunday, 9:30 pm | 1 | 4 | 4 | 18.1% | |
| 31 | "Roselle Nava" | January 6, 2018 | Saturday, 10:00 pm | 1 | 6 | 6 | 19.6% | |
| 32 | "Ito Rapadas" | January 7, 2018 | Sunday, 9:30 pm | 2 | 6 | 6 | 16.6% | |
| 33 | "Frenchie Dy" | January 13, 2018 | Saturday, 10:00 pm | 1 | 4 | 4 | 20.2% | |
| 34 | "Alex Gonzaga" | January 14, 2018 | Sunday, 9:30 pm | 2 | 9 | 9 | 15.3% | |
| 35 | "Juris" | January 20, 2018 | Saturday, 10:00 pm | 1 | 4 | 4 | 21.1% | |
| 36 | "James Reid" | January 21, 2018 | Sunday, 9:30 pm | 2 | 8 | 8 | 17.8% | |
| 37 | "Morissette Amon" | January 27, 2018 | Saturday, 10:00 pm | 1 | 4 | 4 | 22.1% | |
| 38 | "Billy Crawford" | January 28, 2018 | Sunday, 9:30 pm | 2 | 6 | 6 | 18% | |
| 39 | "Richard Yap" | February 3, 2018 | Saturday, 10:00 pm | 1 | 4 | 4 | 22.6% | |
| 40 | "Claire dela Fuente" | February 4, 2018 | Sunday, 9:30 pm | 2 | 9 | 10 | 14.4% | |
| 41 | "Jona Viray" | February 10, 2018 | Saturday, 10:00 pm | 1 | 3 | 3 | 20.8% | |
| 42 | "Piolo Pascual" | February 11, 2018 | Sunday, 9:30 pm | 2 | 7 | 7 | 15.7% | |
| 43 | "Salbakuta" | February 17, 2018 | Saturday, 10:00 pm | 1 | 4 | 4 | 21.2% | |
| 44 | "Vina Morales" | February 18, 2018 | Sunday, 9:30 pm | 2 | 5 | 5 | 16.9% | |
| 45 | "Iñigo Pascual" | February 24, 2018 | Saturday, 10:00 pm | 1 | 6 | 6 | 19.1% | |
| 46 | "Jay R" | February 25, 2018 | Sunday, 9:30 pm | 2 | 6 | 6 | 16.6% | |
| 47 | "Gino Padilla" | March 3, 2018 | Saturday, 10:00 pm | 1 | 5 | 5 | 18.2% | |
| 48 | "Darren Espanto" | March 4, 2018 | Sunday, 9:30 pm | 2 | 6 | 6 | 15.5% | |
| 49 | "Jovit Baldivino" | March 10, 2018 | Saturday, 10:00 pm | 1 | 4 | 4 | 18.1% | |
| 50 | "Rey Valera" | March 11, 2018 | Sunday, 9:30 pm | 2 | 7 | 9 | 14.3% | |
| 51 | "Lilet" | March 17, 2018 | Saturday, 10:00 pm | 1 | 4 | 5 | 18.5% | |
| 52 | "Marc Tupaz" | March 24, 2018 | Saturday, 10:00 pm | 1 | 7 | 8 | 15.4% | |
| 53 | "K Brosas" | March 25, 2018 | Sunday, 9:30 pm | 2 | 5 | 5 | 17.8% | |
| 54 | "BoybandPH" | April 1, 2018 | Sunday, 9:30 pm | 1 | 7 | 8 | 14.6% | |
| 55 | "Jason Dy" | April 7, 2018 | Saturday, 10:00 pm | 1 | 7 | 7 | 17.8% | |
| 56 | "Hajji Alejandro" | April 8, 2018 | Sunday, 9:30 pm | 2 | 6 | 6 | 16.6% | |
| 57 | "Nadine Lustre" | April 14, 2018 | Saturday, 10:00 pm | 1 | 8 | 9 | 14.2% | |
| 58 | "Jugs and Teddy" | April 15, 2018 | Sunday, 9:30 pm | 1 | 7 | 7 | 14.7% | |
| 59 | "Luis Manzano and Vilma Santos-Recto" | April 21, 2018 | Saturday, 10:00 pm | 1 | 8 | 9 | 15.5% | |
| 59 | "Luis Manzano and Vilma Santos-Recto" | April 22, 2018 | Sunday, 9:30 pm | 2 | 5 | 5 | 14.9% | |
| 60 | "Sharon Cuneta" | April 28, 2018 | Saturday, 10:00 pm | 1 | 6 | 7 | 16.5% | |
| 61 | "Kim Chiu" | April 29, 2018 | Sunday, 9:30 pm | 1 | 7 | 7 | 13.9% | |
| 62 | "Wency Cornejo" | May 5, 2018 | Saturday, 10:00 pm | 1 | 8 | 10 | 15.9% | |
| 63 | "Arci Muñoz" | May 6, 2018 | Sunday, 9:30 pm | 1 | 5 | 5 | 16.1% | |
| 64 | "Nyoy Volante" | May 12, 2018 | Saturday, 10:00 pm | 1 | 6 | 7 | 15.9% | |
| 65 | "Rachel Alejandro" | May 13, 2018 | Sunday, 9:30 pm | 2 | 6 | 6 | 14.9% | |
| 66 | "Top Suzara" | May 19, 2018 | Saturday, 10:00 pm | 1 | 7 | 8 | 15.4% | |
| 67 | "Janella Salvador" | May 20, 2018 | Sunday, 9:30 pm | 2 | 5 | 5 | 15.7% | |
| 68 | "Shanti Dope" | May 26, 2018 | Saturday, 10:00 pm | 1 | 6 | 7 | 17.2% | |
| 69 | "Karylle and Yael Yuzon" | May 27, 2018 | Sunday, 9:30 pm | 2 | 9 | 9 | 13.2% | |
| 70 | "Anne Curtis" | June 2, 2018 | Saturday, 10:00 pm | 1 | 8 | 13 | 14.4% | |
| 71 | "Jay Durias" | June 3, 2018 | Sunday, 9:30 pm | 2 | 5 | 5 | 15.6% | |
| 72 | "Kean Cipriano" | June 9, 2018 | Saturday, 10:00 pm | 1 | 8 | 14 | 14.6% | |
| 73 | "Maymay Entrata" | June 10, 2018 | Sunday, 9:30 pm | 1 | 9 | 13 | 13.5% | |
| 74 | "Marco Sison" | June 16, 2018 | Saturday, 10:00 pm | 1 | 9 | 14 | 14.4% | |
| 75 | "Pokwang" | June 17, 2018 | Sunday, 9:30 pm | 1 | 10 | 11 | 14.2% | |
| 76 | "Maja Salvador" | June 23, 2018 | Saturday, 10:00 pm | 1 | 7 | 10 | 16.5% | |
| 77 | "The Voice Teens Alumni" | June 24, 2018 | Sunday, 9:30 pm | 2 | 8 | 13 | 12.5% | |
| 78 | "Wacky Kiray" | June 30, 2018 | Saturday, 10:00 pm | 1 | 8 | 14 | 13% | |
| 79 | "Aegis" | July 1, 2018 | Sunday, 9:30 pm | 2 | 8 | 9 | 13.5% | |
| 80 | "Mitoy Yonting" | July 7, 2018 | Saturday, 10:00 pm | 2 | 10 | 16 | 12.6% | |
| 81 | "Ethel Booba" | July 8, 2018 | Sunday, 9:30 pm | 1 | 11 | 13 | 13.4% | |
| 82 | "Janine Berdin" | July 14, 2018 | Saturday, 10:00 pm | 1 | 7 | 8 | 16.2% | |
| 83 | "Lloyd Umali" | July 15, 2018 | Sunday, 9:30 pm | 2 | 10 | 13 | 13% | |
| 84 | "JC Santos and Bela Padilla" | July 21, 2018 | Saturday, 10:00 pm | 1 | 9 | 11 | 16.2% | |
| 85 | "Imelda Papin" | July 22, 2018 | Sunday, 9:30 pm | 2 | 10 | 10 | 13.6% | |
| 86 | "Andrew E." | July 28, 2018 | Saturday, 10:00 pm | 1 | 9 | 10 | 15.6% | |
| 87 | "Michael Pangilinan" | July 29, 2018 | Sunday, 9:30 pm | 2 | 8 | 10 | 13.6% | |
| 88 | "Rico J. Puno" | August 4, 2018 | Saturday, 10:00 pm | 1 | 7 | 9 | 16.4% | |
| 89 | "Isay Alvarez and Robert Seña" | August 5, 2018 | Sunday, 9:30 pm | 2 | 8 | 11 | 13.5% | |
| 90 | "Pilita Corrales" | August 11, 2018 | Saturday, 10:00 pm | 1 | 6 | 12 | 15.2% | |
| 91 | "Jericho Rosales" | August 12, 2018 | Sunday, 9:30 pm | 2 | 7 | 13 | 12.2% | |
| 92 | "Melai Cantiveros" | August 18, 2018 | Saturday, 10:00 pm | 1 | 8 | 12 | 14.2% | |
| 93 | "Sam Milby" | August 19, 2018 | Sunday, 9:30 pm | 2 | 9 | 12 | 11.9% | |
| 94 | "Miss Granny" | August 25, 2018 | Saturday, 10:00 pm | 1 | 7 | 12 | 14.9% | |
| 95 | "SoulJa" | August 26, 2018 | Sunday, 9:30 pm | 2 | 9 | 9 | 13.3% | |
| 96 | "Ice Seguerra" | September 1, 2018 | Saturday, 10:00 pm | 1 | 7 | 14 | 13% | |
| 97 | "Dulce" | September 2, 2018 | Sunday, 9:30 pm | 2 | 9 | 15 | 11.2% | |
| 98 | "Celeste Legaspi" | September 8, 2018 | Saturday, 10:00 pm | 1 | 7 | 10 | 14.2% | |
| Special | "Best Mode" | September 9, 2018 | Sunday, 9:30 pm | 2 | 9 | 9 | 12.7% | |
| Special | "Daniel Padilla" | September 15, 2018 | Saturday, 10:00 pm | 1 | 7 | 19 | 10.5% | |
| Special | "TNT Boys" | September 16, 2018 | Sunday, 9:30 pm | 2 | 9 | 11 | 11.5% | |
| 99 | "Sharon Cuneta" | September 22, 2018 | Saturday, 10:00 pm | 1 | 9 | 12 | 13.1% | |
| 99 | "Sharon Cuneta" | September 23, 2018 | Sunday, 9:30 pm | 2 | 9 | 13 | 11.1% | |
| Special | "Marcelito Pomoy" | September 29, 2018 | Saturday, 10:00 pm | 1 | 9 | 12 | 13.5% | |
| 100 | "Yassi Pressman and Sam Concepcion" | September 30, 2018 | Sunday, 9:30 pm | 2 | 11 | 15 | 11.1% | |
| 101 | "Gloc 9" | October 6, 2018 | Saturday, 10:00 pm | 1 | 9 | 14 | 11.9% | |
| 102 | "Jinky Vidal" | October 7, 2018 | Sunday, 9:30 pm | 2 | 11 | 15 | 9.5% | |
| 103 | "Bea Alonzo and Aga Muhlach" | October 13, 2018 | Saturday, 10:00 pm | 1 | 9 | 17 | 9.8% | |
| 104 | "Nikki Valdez and John Lapus" | October 14, 2018 | Sunday, 9:30 pm | 2 | 10 | 15 | 10.2% | |
| 105 | "Joey Generoso" | October 20, 2018 | Saturday, 10:00 pm | 1 | 8 | 19 | 8.2% | |
| 106 | "Janno Gibbs" | October 21, 2018 | Sunday, 9:30 pm | 2 | 11 | 12 | 11.1% | |
| 107 | "Pepe Hererra" | October 27, 2018 | Saturday, 10:00 pm | 1 | 9 | 13 | 10.9% | |
| 108 | "Kuh Ledesma" | October 28, 2018 | Sunday, 9:30 pm | 2 | 11 | 14 | 10.5% | |
| 109 | "ASAP G!" | November 3, 2018 | Saturday, 10:00 pm | 1 | 8 | 17 | 10.9% | |
| 110 | "Jodi Sta. Maria" | November 10, 2018 | Saturday, 10:00 pm | 1 | 8 | 15 | 11.3% | |
| 111 | "Bugoy Drilon and Liezel Garcia" | November 11, 2018 | Sunday, 9:30 pm | 1 | 10 | 15 | 11% | |
| 112 | "Regine Velasquez" | November 17, 2018 | Saturday, 10:00 pm | 1 | 9 | 16 | 11% | |
| 113 | "Kris Lawrence" | November 18, 2018 | Sunday, 9:30 pm | 1 | 11 | 16 | 9.7% | |
| 114 | "DIVAS" | November 24, 2018 | Saturday, 10:00 pm | 1 | 9 | 12 | 12.5% | |
| 115 | "Noven Belleza and Sam Mangubat" | November 25, 2018 | Sunday, 9:30 pm | 2 | 11 | 15 | 10.4% | |
| 116 | "Birit Queens" | December 1, 2018 | Saturday, 10:00 pm | 1 | 9 | 15 | 10.2% | |
| 117 | "Louie Heredia" | December 2, 2018 | Sunday, 9:30 pm | 2 | 11 | 15 | 10.6% | |
| 118 | "Abrenica Brothers" | December 8, 2018 | Saturday, 10:00 pm | 1 | 9 | 11 | 13.7% | |
| 119 | "Jessa Zaragoza and Dingdong Avanzado" | December 9, 2018 | Sunday, 9:30 pm | 1 | 11 | 15 | 11% | |
| Special | "TJ Monterde and KZ Tandingan" | December 22, 2018 | Saturday, 10:00 pm | 1 | 9 | 12 | 11.9% | |
| 120 | "Gonzaga Sisters" | December 23, 2018 | Sunday, 9:30 pm | 2 | 10 | 11 | 13.8% | |
| 121 | "Nikki Valdez, Roselle Nava and Desiree del Valle" | December 29, 2018 | Saturday, 10:00 pm | 1 | 9 | 12 | 12.8% | |
| 122 | "Bayani Agbayani and Edu Manzano" | January 5, 2019 | Saturday, 10:00 pm | 1 | 9 | 12 | 12.8% | |
| 123 | "Gary Valenciano" | January 6, 2019 | Sunday, 9:30 pm | 2 | 10 | 13 | 11.2% | |

Source: Kantar Media Philippines
