= Renz Verano =

Filipino singer (born 1960)

Laurence Roger Verano Mendoza (born December 11, 1960), professionally known as Renz Verano, is a Filipino singer best known for his hoarse style of balladeering. His professional career began when he released under OctoArts EMI his eponymous debut album, and has since given regular live performances in various events and concerts, either as a guest performer or with the musical group the OPM Hitmen.

== Early life and career ==
Renz Verano graduated from the University of the Philippines Diliman with a Bachelor of Arts degree in Business Economics in 1982.

Verano released his eponymous debut album under OctoArts EMI (now PolyEast Records) in 1996, and won the Awit Award for Best New Male Artist for his song "Mahal Kita" from the album.

In 2024, he became one of the judges in noontime variety show TiktoClock's revival of 1980's amateur singing competition Tanghalan ng Kampeon.

== Discography ==
=== Studio albums ===
- Renz Verano (1996)
- Para Sa'yo (1997)
- Mula Noon Hanggang Ngayon (1998)
- Basta't Mahal Kita (2000)
- Lorena (2001)
- Memories (2002)
- Everyday (2003)
- R&R Sessions (with Rannie Raymundo, 2008)

=== Compilation albums ===
- Greatest Hits (1999)
- Renz Verano (2006)
- The Ultimate Hits Collection (2016)

=== Contributions to multi-artist compilations ===
- pagbabago ("Kaduda-duda Ka", 2003)

== Filmography ==
Year	Title	Role	Notes	Network
2017	My Love from the Star	Marlon "Minggo" Chavez	Guest role	GMA Network
2024–present	TiktoClock	Himself	Tanghalan ng Kampeon judge	GMA Network

== Awards and nominations ==
Year	Award-giving body	Category	Nominated work	Results
1996	9th Awit Awards	Best New Male Artist	"Mahal Kita"	Won
1998	11th Awit Awards	Best Country Rock Ballad Recording Artist		Won
