= Doris Bigornia =

Filipino journalist and news presenter (born 1966)

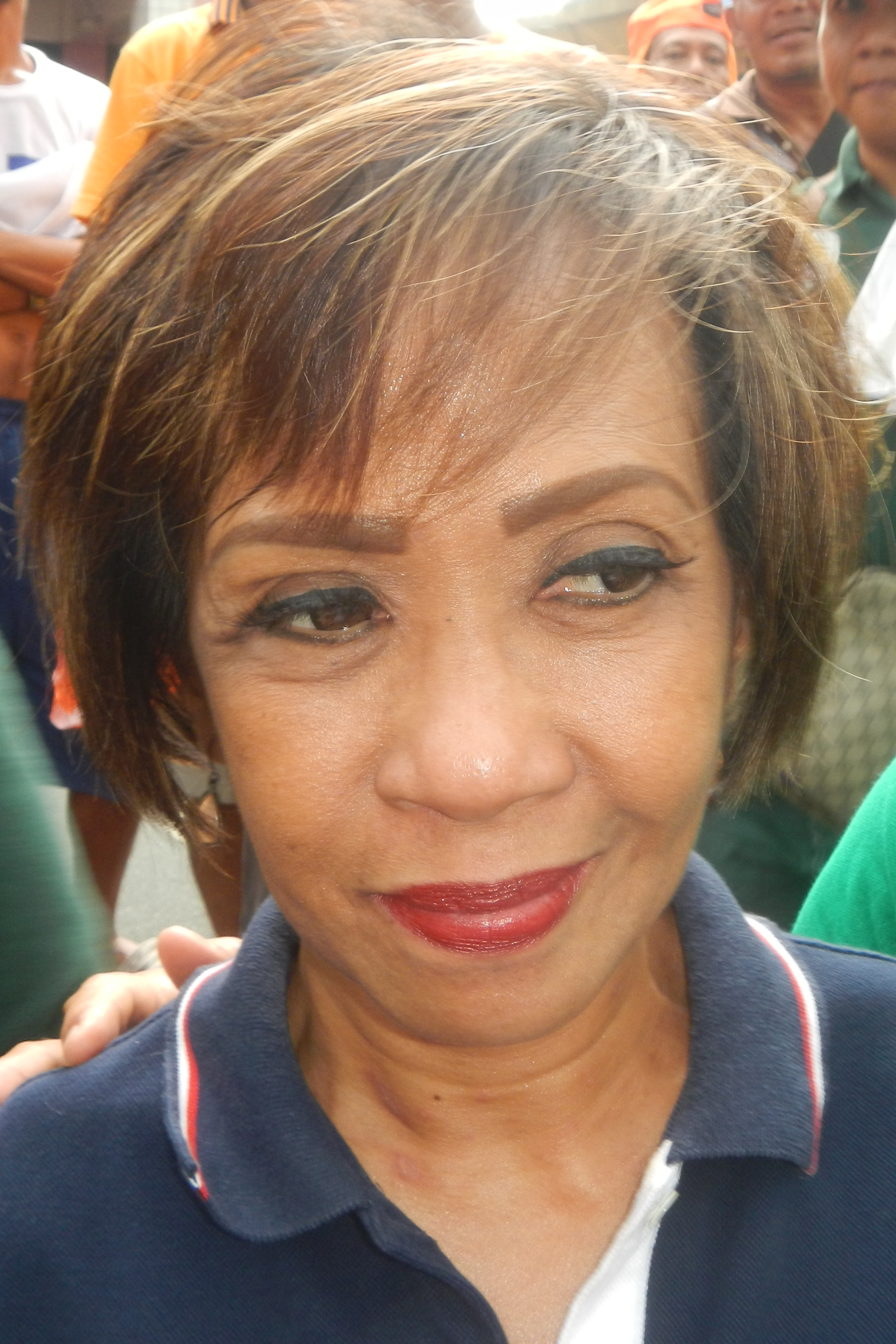
- Bigornia in 2017
- Born: Doris Agbayani Bigornia; February 17, 1966 (age 60); Philippines
- Occupation: Journalist
- Known for: S.R.O.: Suhestyon, Reaksyon at Opinyon; Gising Pilipinas; Tandem ng Bayan; TeleRadyo Serbisyo Balita; Radyo Patrol Balita Alas-Siyete; Aksyon DOLE sa DZMM; Mutya Ng Masa
- Children: 2

Doris Agbayani Bigornia (Tagalog: [ˈdɔɾis bɪˈgɔɾɲa]; born February 17, 1966) is a Filipino journalist, field reporter, and news presenter.

== Career ==
Bigornia is a journalist and field reporter for ABS-CBN News. In 2001, she was among the journalists who covered the May 1 riots near Malacañang Palace that was noted to be aggressive towards news media. After her departure in 2007, she worked as a freelance reporter.

In 2013, she resumed working with ABS-CBN following a hiatus. On December 21, 2017, she was injured along with her coworker and four others in a car accident when a Montero Sport suddenly crashed into her news car along with a motorcycle and five cars in EDSA-Shaw underpass.

On May 15, 2020, during an interview with Ayala Malls president Jennylle Tupaz on TeleRadyo's SRO: Suhestyon, Reaksyon at Opinyon, Bigornia's two cats began fighting. Bigornia's daughter Nikki provided context to the scrape by sharing the footage on social media. The clip eventually went viral and was picked up by various international news and entertainment outlets.

On December 19, 2020, Metropolitan Manila Development Authority (MMDA) Assistant Secretary Celine Pialago called Bigornia a "demon" after an allegedly misleading report about the re-opening of Dario Bridge in Quezon City.

On June 30, 2023, Bigornia, alongside Alvin Elchico, debuted as the new anchor of Gising Pilipinas on the newly-launched DWPM, the temporary successor of DZMM on the 630 kHz frequency.

On August 26, 2024, Bigornia became the new anchor of TeleRadyo Serbisyo Balita alongside Elchico, replacing Joyce Balancio who left the network one day prior. When DZMM was relaunched in 2025, the newscast was relaunched as the revived Radyo Patrol Balita: Alas-Siyete and Bigornia became the anchor of the new radio program Tandem ng Bayan. On August 30, 2025, Bigornia became the anchor of the new radio program, Aksyon DOLE sa DZMM.

== Personal life ==
On February 23, 2021, Bigornia suffered a heart attack and underwent surgery. She is also a diabetic and was later diagnosed with chronic kidney disease, which prevented her from doing field reporting.

The begonia species Begonia dorisiae, which was discovered in Davao Oriental, is named after Bigornia.
