= Bayani Agbayani =

Filipino actor, host, singer and comedian (born 1969)

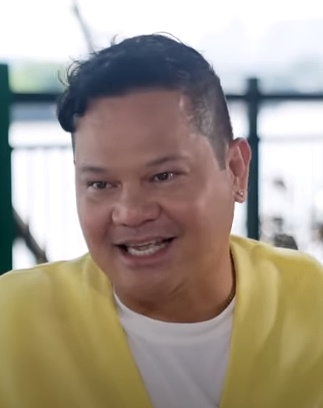
- Agbayani in 2023
- Born: Bayani Sequita Rogacion Jr. January 3, 1969 (age 57); Quezon City, Rizal, Philippines
- Education: Polytechnic University of the Philippines(BA)
- Occupations: Television presenter; singer; actor
- Years active: 1993–present
- Agents: Star Magic (1996-2009, 2014-present); Regal Entertainment; Viva Artists Agency; Brightlight Productions
- Spouse: Lenlen Caramancion (m. 1996)
- Children: 4

Bayani Sequita Rogacion Jr. (born January 3, 1969), known professionally as Bayani Agbayani, is a Filipino host, actor, singer, and comedian. After 15 years at ABS-CBN, he shuttled between his original home studio GMA Network and TV5 for the time being from 2008 to 2014 before moving back to ABS-CBN once more. Most of his television shows involves hosting, though he starred in several sitcoms. Most of his films involve actions with comedy.

== Early life ==
Bayani Agbayani was born as Bayani Sequita Rogacion Jr. on January 3, 1969, in Quezon City. He is the only son and the youngest among six children of a poor couple based in Silang, Cavite. His father died when Bayani was still three years old.

He pursued a degree in engineering at the Far Eastern University in Manila but dropped out due to inability to afford tuition fees. He moved to Polytechnic University of the Philippines where he studied under a scholarship and shifted to a mass communications degree. Agbayani worked on the sidelines to support his studies; a staff member of a Dunkin' Donuts outlet and a porter for a bicycle store owned by his grandmother in Divisoria. He finished college in 1992.

== Career ==
Upon graduating from college, Agbayani was hired by GMA Network as one of the production staff for the then noontime show Lunch Date. When the show was reformatted to SST: Salo-Salo Together, he was absorbed into the new show and started appearing occasionally as an extra during the show's segment skits. He eventually started appearing on camera (he was introduced by the mononym Bayani) since then as the show's resident sidekick and comic relief, until SST: Salo-Salo Together moved to an earlier time slot to give way to erstwhile rival Eat Bulaga! in the GMA noontime slot. When SST: Salo-Salo Together bade farewell and was replaced by Katok Mga Misis!, he stayed on until 1996. He hired Cornelia "Angge" Lee as his talent manager who subsequently transferred him to ABS-CBN.

He later on assumed the screen name Bayani Agbayani when he transferred to ABS-CBN in 1996. His official debut movie was Wanted Perfect Murder with the comedian Redford White (late) and Eric Quizon and was released in 1997. He also appeared earlier in 1994 in the movie Forever with Mikee Cojuangco and Aga Muhlach but was uncredited.

Agbayani ventured appeared mostly in some comedy movies like Pera o Bayong, Mana Mana, Tiba Tiba, Otso-Otso Pamela-Mela-Wan, Walang Iwanan, Peksman, and Sangano't Sanggago; sitcoms such as Super Laff-In, Kaya ni Mister, Kaya ni Misis and Okay, Fine! Whatever!; and noontime shows like Magandang Tanghali Bayan.

Agbayani captured the heart of Filipino viewers through his wit and sense of humor.

He returned to his original TV network, GMA Network, with Diz Iz It!, a variety-talent show. He also worked at SRO Cinemaserye, First Time, and his returning sitcom, JejeMom in 2010 with his co-star Eugene Domingo.

In 2012, Agbayani is former mainstay and contract artist of TV5.

In 2015, Agbayani returns home to ABS-CBN after 10 years, he's now a new co-host for It's Showtime newest comedy segment, My Funny One, the same year and Bayani is also part of the cast in Pangako Sa 'Yo.

In 2017, Agbayani became a SING-vestigator in the Philippine edition of the mystery music game show, I Can See Your Voice. The 5th episode of the first season was his first appearance as a SING-vestigator.

== Other ventures ==
In January 2022, Agbayani became an official endorser of the online cockfighting (or e-sabong) application Sabong International operated by Visayas Cockers Club Inc.

== Personal life ==
Agbayani has been married to Aleja "Lenlen" Caramancion since 1996. They have four daughters.

== Filmography ==
=== Film ===
Year	Title	Role
1997	Wanted: Perfect Murder	Imbestigador
1997	Amanos: Patas na Ang Laban	
1998	Pagdating ng Panahon	
1998	Marahas: Walang Kilalang Batas	
1999	Type Kita ... Walang Kokontra!	Primo Barcelona
1999	Abel Villarama: Armado	Banong
1999	'Di Puwedeng Hindi Puwede	Estong
1999	Resbak, Babalikan Kita	Benny
2000	Mana-Mana Tiba-Tiba	Uging
2000	Pera O Bayong (Not Da TV!)	Engelbert
2000	Juan & Ted: Wanted	Ted
2001	Hostage	SPO1 Edwin Francisco
2001	Baliktaran: Si Ace at Si Daisy	Desiderio/Daisy
2001	Sanggano't Sanggago	Willy
2002	Walang Iwanan ... Peksman!	Bodong
2002	Cass & Cary: Who Wants to Be a Billionaire?	Cassidey "Cass" Imperial
2003	Utang na Ama	Bro. Bayani
2004	Otso-Otso Pamela-Mela-Wan	Boy/Mao
2006	Pacquiao: The Movie	Buboy
2006	Ligalig	Inggo
2007	Katas ng Saudi	Pol
2009	Pinoy Sunday	Dado Tagalog
2011	Zombadings 1: Patayin sa Shokot si Remington	Unexpected Cameo
2012	El Presidente	Baldomero Aguinaldo
2016	Isang Araw Lang: Ikatlong Yugto	Bayani
2017	Woke Up Like This	Daiko
2018	Mary, Marry Me	Gardo
2019	Pansamantagal	Leo
2019	Feelenial: Feeling Millennial	Mystery man
2019	Aswang ang Nanay Ko	
2020	Mang Kepweng: Ang Lihim ng Bandanang Itim	

=== Television ===
Year	Title	Role
1993–1994	SST: Salo-Salo Together	Co-host
1993–1995	Haybol Rambol	Various
1995–1996	Katok Mga Misis	Katokling the Talking Bird
1998–1999	Super Laff-In	Himself
1998–2003	Magandang Tanghali Bayan	Co-host
1997–2001	Kaya ni Mister, Kaya ni Misis	Various
1999	Math-Tinik	Mang Gugu
2002–2005	OK Fine, Whatever!	Miguel
2003–2004	Masayang Tanghali Bayan	Co-host
2005–2006	Magandang Umaga, Pilipinas	Co-host
2006	John en Shirley	Tengteng
2006	Komiks: Celopakwak	
2006	Nagmamahal, Kapamilya	Guest
2006	O-Ha!	
2007	Ke-Mis: Ke Misis Umaasa	
2007–2008	That's My Doc	Buddy
2008–2010	Kiddie Kwela	Host
2008	Dragonna	Narcisso A.K.A Tatay Ngit
2009	Sharon	Guest co-host
2009	Obra	Rigor
2009	SRO Cinemaserye: Meet The Fathers	Rigor
2009–2010	SOP Rules	Co-host
2010	First Time	Raffy Santiago
2010	Diz Iz It!	Host
2010	Kap's Amazing Stories Kids Edition	Host
2010	Pepito Manaloto	Brando
2010	Jejemom	Randy
2011	Showtime	Judge
2011	Untold Stories	Various
2011	Carlo J. Caparas' Bangis	Chairman Sheperd
2012	Video Incredible	Host
2012	Toda Max	Thor
2013	Minute to Win It	Player
2013–2014	Madam Chairman	Jojo Camponanes
2014	Confessions of a Torpe	Adonis Pante
2014	Home Sweetie Home	Robert "Bert" De Mesa
2014	Tropa Mo Ko Unli	Various Guest
2015	Bogart Case Files	Guest Cameo
2015	The Singing Bee	Guest Contestant
2015	Tunay na Buhay	Guest
2015	Sabado Badoo	Cameo Footage Featured
2015	Kapamilya, Deal or No Deal	Himself, Lucky Player #10
2015	It's Showtime	Co-host
2015	Pangako Sa 'Yo	Kabayan
2016	Funny Ka, Pare Ko	Bigboy
2017–present	I Can See Your Voice	SING-vestigators
2018	Sana Dalawa ang Puso	Oyo
2019	Home Sweetie Home	Edwin
2019	It's Showtime	Unevictable Hurado
2020–2023	Lunch Out Loud / Tropang LOL	Himself / Host
2023–2024	Sinong Manok Mo?	Himself / Game Master
2025	Rainbow Rumble	Himself / Contestant

=== Discography ===
Artist	Album	Tracks	Records	Year
Bayani Agbayani	Ito Gusto Mo!	"Atras Abante", "Otso Otso", "Alam Kong 'Di Ako, Okey Lang", "'Di Man Mahusay Kumanta", "Pag Andres na Ako", "Si Misis", "Atin Ang Gabi", "Pag Puti na Uwak", "Kung Di Lang Din Ikaw"	Star Music	2004
Bayani Agbayani	Pasko Na!	"Pag-bati Ng Pasko", "Pasko Na (Paksiw Pa)", "Krismas Aw Aw!", "Maligayang Pasko", "Magbati Na Tayo", "Ikaw Ang Krismas", "Pasko Ay Para Sa Lahat", "Pass Ako", "Si Carol May Kililing", "Ngayong Pasko", "Mano Mano Beso Beso", "Eto Na Ang Bagong Taon"	Star Music	2004
Bayani Agbayani	Mr. B	"Tararadyin Pot Pot", "Mag-exercise Tayo", "Ipukpok Mo", "Iba Na Ang Pogi", "Philippine Geography", "Igiling-giling, Ikembot-kembot", "Minadyik Mo Ang Puso Ko", "Kahulugan Ng Nunal", "Tiyayabum"	Alpha Music	2007
