= List of former Kapamilya Online Live streams =

Below is a partial list of shows that were previously streamed on the Philippine web-based channel, Kapamilya Online Live. For its currently streaming shows, see the list of Kapamilya Online Live original programming.

== Previous programs ==
=== Live-gap programs ===
- 2G2BT: BreakTrue (2022)
- Ang Reaksyon Mo ay Akin (2020–2021)
- Ang Sa Iyo ay Akin: Unscripted (2020–2021)
- A Soldier's Heart: The Final Salute Live Gap Show (September 18, 2020)
- Bagong Umaga: The BREAKing Dawn (2020–2021)
- Cutting Classes: Senior High Live Gap Show (2023)
- Darna: Live Gap Show (2022; 2023)
- Dream Maker Online Hub (2022)
- FPJAP: Ang Pambansang Pagtatapos Live Gap Show (2022)
- FPJAP: Tuloy ang Laban at Kwentuhan (2020)
- Huwag Kang Mangamba: The Live Gap Show (2021)
- iWant ASAP (2018–2026)
- Breaktime sa Showtime (2020)
- IbaYanihan (2020–2021)
- Kapamilya Chat Presents Viral Scandal: The End of Scandal Live Gap Show (May 13, 2022)
- Love Thy Chikahan (2020) (Note: Love Thy Woman was aired on ABS-CBN From February 10 to March 20, 2020 The Show Suspended due to the restrictions imposed in response to the COVID-19 pandemic in the Philippines, and was temporarily replaced by reruns of Walang Hanggan, The Legal Wife, and Got to Believe the 3 reruns ended due to shutdown of the said network. The online show became known as Love Thy Chikahan.)
- Lucky Onliners, It's Your Lucky Day! (2023)
- Nag-Aapoy na Damdamin: The Final Checkmate Live Gap Show (2024)
- PBB Kumunect Tayo: Primetime Show (2020–2021)
- PBB Kumulitan (2021–2022)
- Pinoy Big Brother: Celebrity Collab Edition OnlineVerse (2025)
- Pinoy Big Brother: Celebrity Collab Edition 2.0 OnlineVerse (2025–2026)
- PrimeTIMEbayan (2024)
- TV Patrol: Facebook Live (exclusive only on ABS-CBN News and the show’s Facebook pages, 2020–2021)
- The Broken Marriage Vow: Gigil Gap Show (2022)
- Walang Hanggang Kumustahan (2020; 2021)
- Your Face Sounds Familiar: KaFamiliar Online Live (2021)

=== Newscast ===
- News Patrol (2020)

=== Current affairs ===
- Iba 'Yan! (2020–2021)
- KBYN: Kaagapay ng Bayan (2022–2023)
- Paano Kita Mapasasalamatan? (2020–2021)

=== Teleserye ===
- 2 Good 2 Be True (2022)
- 100 Days to Heaven (2011; re-run)
- A Family Affair (2022)
- A Love to Last (2017; re-run)
- A Soldier's Heart (2020; re-run)
- Apoy sa Dagat (2013; re-run)
- All of Me (2015–2016; re-run)
- Almost Paradise (2021; re-run)
- And I Love You So (2015–2016: re-run)
- Ang sa Iyo ay Akin (2020–2021; re-run)
- Asintado (2018; re-run)
- Bagani (2018; re-run)
- Bagong Umaga (2020–2021)
- Bawal Lumabas: The Series (2021)
- Bagito (2014–2015; re-run)
- Be Careful with My Heart (2012–2014; re-run)
- Be My Lady (2016; re-run)
- Born for You (2016; re-run)
- Bridges of Love (2015; re-run)
- Budoy (2011–2012; re-run)
- Bukas na Lang Kita Mamahalin (2013; re-run)
- Calla Lily (2006; re-run)
- Can't Buy Me Love (2023–2024)
- Dahil sa Pag-ibig (2012; re-run)
- Dirty Linen (2023)
- Doble Kara (2015–2017; re-run)
- Dolce Amore (2016; re-run)
- Flor de Liza (2015; re-run)
- Forevermore (2014–2015; re-run)
- FPJ's Ang Probinsyano (2015–2022)
- FPJ's Batang Quiapo (2023–2026)
- Got to Believe (2013–2014; re-run)
- Gulong ng Palad (2006; re-run)
- Give Love on Christmas (2014–2015; re-run)
- Halik (2018–2019; re-run)
- Hawak Kamay (2014; re-run)
- He's Into Her (2021–2022)
- High Street (2024)
- Hinahanap-Hanap Kita (2020)
- Hiwaga ng Kambat (2019; re-run)
- Honesto (2013–2014; re-run)
- Hoy, Love You! (2021–2022)
- Huwag Ka Lang Mawawala (2013; re-run)
- Huwag Kang Mangamba (2021)
- Iisa Pa Lamang (2008; re-run)
- Ikaw Lamang (2014; re-run)
- Ikaw Lang ang Iibigin (2017–2018; re-run)
- Imortal (2010–2011; re-run)
- Incognito (2025)
- Inday Bote (2015; re-run)
- Init sa Magdamag (2021; re-run)
- It's Okay to Not Be Okay (2025)
- Juan dela Cruz (2013; re-run)
- Kadenang Ginto (2018–2020; re-run)
- Kahit Puso'y Masugatan (2012–2013; re-run)
- Kampanerang Kuba (2005–2006; re-run)
- Katorse (2009–2010; re-run)
- Kay Tagal Kang Hinintay (2002–2003; re-run)
- Kokey (2007; re-run)
- Kokey at Ako (2010; re-run)
- La Luna Sangre (2017–2018; re-run)
- La Vida Lena (2021–2022)
- Langit Lupa (2016–2017; re-run)
- Lavender Fields (2024–2025)
- Linlang: The Teleserye Version (2024)
- Love in 40 Days (2022)
- Love Thy Woman (2020; re-run)
- Lovers in Paris (2009; re-run)
- Maging Sino Ka Man (2006–2007; re-run)
- Maging Sino Ka Man: Ang Pagbabalik (2007–2008; re-run)
- Magkaribal (2010; re-run)
- Magpahanggang Wakas (2016–2017; re-run)
- Marinella (1999–2001; re-run)
- Marry Me, Marry You (2021–2022)
- May Isang Pangarap (2013; re-run)
- Mars Ravelo's Darna (2022–2023)
- May Bukas Pa (2009–2010; re-run)
- Mga Anghel na Walang Langit (2005–2006; re-run)
- Momay (2010; re-run)
- Mula sa Puso (2011; re-run)
- Muling Buksan ang Puso (2013; re-run)
- My Dear Heart (2017; re-run)
- My Little Juan (2013; re-run)
- Nag-aapoy na Damdamin (2023–2024)
- Nasaan Ka Nang Kailangan Kita (2015; re-run)
- Nathaniel (2015; re-run)
- Nang Ngumiti ang Langit (2019; re-run)
- Ningning (2015–2016; re-run)
- Ngayon at Kailanman (2018–2019; re-run)
- Oh My G! (2015; re-run)
- Pamilya Sagrado (2024)
- Pangako sa 'Yo (2015–2016; rerun)
- Parasite Island (2019; re-run)
- Pasión de Amor (2015–2016; re-run)
- Pira-Pirasong Paraiso (2023–2024)
- Precious Hearts Romances Presents: Araw Gabi (2018; re-run)
- Precious Hearts Romances Presents: Bud Brothers (2009; re-run)
- Precious Hearts Romances Presents: Los Bastardos (2018–2019; re-run)
- Precious Hearts Romances Presents: Lumayo Ka Man sa Akin (2012; re-run)
- Prinsesa ng Banyera (2007–2008; re-run)
- Pure Love (2014; re-run)
- Pusong Ligaw (2017–2018; re-run)
- Roja (2025–2026)
- Rubi (2010; re-run)
- Run to Me (2022)
- Sabel (2010–2011; re-run)
- Sandugo (2019–2020; re-run)
- Sana Bukas Pa ang Kahapon (2014; re-run)
- Sana Dalawa ang Puso (2018; re-run)
- Sana Maulit Muli (2007; re-run)
- Sarah the Teen Princess (2004; re-run)
- Saving Grace: The Untold Story (2025)
- Senior High (2023–2024)
- Since I Found You (2018; re-run)
- Sino ang Maysala?: Mea Culpa (2019; re-run)
- Sins of the Father (2025)
- Tanging Yaman (2010; re-run)
- The Better Half (2017; re-run)
- The Blood Sisters (2018; re-run)
- The Broken Marriage Vow (2022)
- The General's Daughter (2019; re-run)
- The Good Son (2017–2018; re-run)
- The Greatest Love (2016–2017; re-run)
- The Legal Wife (2014; re-run)
- The Haunted (2019–2020; re-run)
- The Iron Heart (2022–2023)
- The Promise of Forever (2017; re-run)
- The Secrets of Hotel 88 (2026)
- The Story of Us (2016; re-run)
- Till I Met You (2016–2017; re-run)
- Tubig at Langis (2016; re-run)
- Two Wives (2014–2015; re-run)
- Vietnam Rose (2005–2006; re-run)
- Viral Scandal (2021–2022)
- Walang Hanggan (2012; re-run)
- Walang Hanggang Paalam (2020–2021)
- Wansapanataym (2005–2019; re-run)
- We Will Survive (2016; re-run)
- What Lies Beneath (2025–2026)
- You're My Home (2015–2016; re-run)

=== Reality ===
- Idol Kids Philippines (2025)
- Idol Philippines (season 2) (2022)
- Pilipinas Got Talent (season 7) (2025)
- Pinoy Big Brother: Connect (2020–2021)
- Pinoy Big Brother: Kumunity Season 10 (2021–2022)
- Pinoy Big Brother: Gen 11 (2024)
- Pinoy Big Brother: Celebrity Collab Edition (2025)
- Pinoy Big Brother: Celebrity Collab Edition 2.0 (2025–2026)
- Star Hunt: The Audition Show (2024)
- The Voice Kids (season 5) (2023)
- The Voice Teens (season 2) (2020)
- The Voice Teens (season 3) (2024)
- Time to Dance (2025)
- Your Face Sounds Familiar (season 3) (2021)

=== Game ===
- Celebrity Playtime (2020)
- Pilipinas, Game KNB? (2020–2022)
- Everybody, Sing! (season 1) (2021)
- Everybody, Sing! (season 2) (2022–2023)
- Everybody, Sing! (season 3) (2023–2024)
- I Can See Your Voice (season 3) (2020–2021)
- I Can See Your Voice (season 4) (2022)
- I Can See Your Voice (season 5) (2023–2024)
- Rainbow Rumble (season 1) (2024–2025)

=== Comedy ===
- Goin' Bulilit (2005–2025)

=== Talk ===
- Ask Angelica (2020)
- Gandang Gabi, Vice! (2011–2020)
- Good Vibes with Edu (2020, 2021)
- I Feel U (2020–2021)
- Kumu Star Ka! (2020–2024)
- LSS: The Martin Nievera Show (2021)
- Magandang Buhay (2016–2026)
- Real Talk: The Heart of Matter (2021)
- Showbiz Pa More! (2020–2021)

=== Informative ===
- G Diaries (2020–2022)
  - Season 7 (2020–2021)
  - Season 8: Change the World 2gether (2021)
  - Season 9: Stronger 2gether (2021–2022)
- Swak na Swak (2020–2021)
- Team FitFil (2020–2024; re-run)

=== Kapamilya Online Live Global programs available on YouTube feed ===
Public service

- BRGY: Our Global Barangay (2021–2024)
- Citizen Pinoy (2021–2024)

Lifestyle

- Keeping It Real with Rob & Ning (2021–2024)
- Made for YouTube Originals (2021–2024)

Interstitials

- Beats × Pieces (music videos courtesy of Star Music) (2021–2024)

== Specials ==
- Ang Pagbabalik ng Ibong Adarna (November 22, 2020)
- Napapanahong Bayani: Gawad Geny Lopez Jr. Bayaning Pilipino Special (August 8, 2020)
- Love Unlock (August 15, 2020)
- Fedelina: A Stolen Life (October 25, 2020)
- Ikaw ang Liwanag at Ligaya: The ABS-CBN Christmas Special 2020 (December 20, 2020)
- Sa Likod ng Balita: The ABS-CBN 2020 Year-End Special (December 27, 2020)
- Hello Stranger: Marathon Special (January 31, 2021)
- Be The Light: The BGYO Launch (February 7, 2021)
- Himig 11th Edition: The Finals (March 21, 2021)
- Be Careful With My Heart: The Global Kapit-Bisig Day (April 5, 2021; re-run)
- BINI: The Launch (June 20, 2021)
- Noy (June 27, 2021)
- Isang Tinig, Isang Lahi (One Voice, One People): Live Aid Philippines (July 4, 2021)
- ASAP Natin 'To: Kapamilya Forever Day (July 11, 2021)
- Star Magic Black Pen Day (July 18, 2021)
- State of the Nation Address 2021 (July 26, 2021; highlights via TV Patrol)
- State of the Nation Address 2022 (July 25, 2022; highlights via TV Patrol)
- He's Into Her: The Benison Ball (August 16, 2021)
- Heroes in the Hot Zone (September 25, 2021; re-run)
- Andito Tayo Para Sa Isa't Isa: The ABS-CBN Christmas Special 2021 (December 18, 2021)
- PBB Kumunity Season 10: Big PasKoncert (December 25, 2021)
- Sa Likod ng Balita: The ABS-CBN 2021 Year-End Special (December 26, 2021)
- One Music X (1MX) Manila 2021 (January 8–9, 2022)
- Harapan 2022: An ABS-CBN News Special (March 28 – April 7, 2022)
- All Time HIH: The Road to He's Into Her Season 2 (April 17, 2022)
- Halalan 2022: The ABS-CBN News Special Coverage (May 9–10, 2022)
- Halalan 2022: The ANC Special Coverage (May 10, 2022)
- Star Magic All-Star Games 2022 (July–August 2022)
- TWOropang LOL Live in Bacolod (October 21–25, 2022)
- Mutya Ng Pilipinas 2022 Grand Coronation Night (December 4, 2022)
- Asian Academy Creative Awards 2022 (December 11, 2022)
- Tayo ang Ligaya ng Isa't Isa: The ABS-CBN Christmas Special 2022 (December 17–18, 2022)
- MMK Grand Kumustahan (December 24, 2022)
- Star Cinema is Back2Back (The Making of "Labyu With An Accent" and "Partners In Crime") (December 25, 2022)
- One Dream: The BINI and BGYO Concert (December 31, 2022)
- Sa Likod ng Balita: The ABS-CBN 2022 Year-End Special (December 31, 2022)
- Salubong 2023: The ABS-CBN New Year Countdown Special (December 31, 2022)
- Anim na Dekada... Nag-iisang Vilma (February 18–19, 2023)
- Rise With You (February 25–26, 2023)
- Slay Model Search Asia 2023 (April 30, 2023)
- Awit ng Kabataan: Boses ng Kinabukasan (May 27-28, 2023)
- State of the Nation Address 2023 (July 24, 2023)
- Forever Grateful: ABS-CBN Ball 2023 - Metro Live at the Red Carpet (October 8, 2023)
- Asian Academy Creative Awards 2023 (December 10, 2023)
- Forever Grateful: The ABS-CBN Christmas Special 2023 (December 16–17, 2023)
- Sa Likod ng Balita: The ABS-CBN 2023 Year-End Special (December 30–31, 2023)
- Salubong 2024: The ABS-CBN New Year Countdown Special (December 31, 2023)
- State of the Nation Address 2024 (July 23, 2024)
- Tulong-Tulong Hanggang Dulo (October 25, 2024; highlights via TV Patrol Express)
- Shine Kapamilya Tulong-Tulong Ngayong Pasko: The ABS-CBN Christmas Special 2024 (December 14–15, 2024)
- Sa Likod ng Balita: The ABS-CBN 2024 Year-End Special (December 28, 2024)
- Salubong 2025: The ABS-CBN New Year Countdown Special (December 31, 2024)
- Duterte sa ICC: The ABS-CBN News Special Coverage (March 11, 2025; highlights via TV Patrol and The World Tonight)
- Alex Eala at the 2025 Miami Open (March 28, 2025)
- Leo XIV: Viva Il Papa: The ABS-CBN News Special (May 10, 2025)
- Halalan 2025: The ABS-CBN News Special Coverage (May 12-13, 2025)
- PBB Collab: The Big Carnival Concert (May 17, 2025)

=== Holy week specials ===
- The Healing Eucharist Holy Week Masses (2021–2022, 2024; also broadcast on Kapamilya Channel and A2Z)
- The Seven Last Words (2021–2022; also broadcast on Kapamilya Channel, Jeepney TV and A2Z)
- Huwag Kang Mangamba: The Holy Week Special (April 2, 2021; also broadcast on Kapamilya Channel)
- The Best of MMK (also broadcast on Kapamilya Channel and A2Z)
  - "Flyers"/"Bisikleta" (April 16, 2022)
  - "Bisikleta" (March 28, 2024)
  - Kalendaryo" (March 29, 2024)
  - "Belo" (March 29, 2024)
  - "Flyers" (March 29, 2024)
  - "Garapon" (March 29, 2024)
  - "Family Picture"/"Bote"/"Passport" (March 30, 2024)
