= Everybody, Sing! season 4 =

2026 television game show series

Everybody, Sing!
- Season 4
- Hosted by: Vice Ganda
- No. of contestants: 50
- No. of winners: 3
- No. of episodes: 26

Release
- Original network: Kapamilya Channel (Note: Through its ABS-CBN licensing, the program is also broadcast on free television via ALLTV2 and on cable through the Kapamilya Channel, as well as streamed on Kapamilya Online Live via Facebook and YouTube. It is likewise simulcast locally on free TV through A2Z and TV5 (starting from episode 15), and internationally via The Filipino Channel.)
- Original release: May 2 – October 4, 2026

Season chronology
- ← Previous; Season 3

The fourth season of the musical game show Everybody, Sing! aired on ALLTV2 (through its ABS-CBN licensing) and the Kapamilya Channel from May 2 to October 4, 2026 with simulcasts on A2Z, TV5, and Kapamilya Online Live.

It currently holds the record for the fewest number of groups played in a season, with 13 groups.

== Overview ==
Promotional poster

On April 23, 2026, Everybody, Sing! released a teaser on its official social media accounts, referencing the iconic “Goodness Gracious!” line of Vice Ganda from the 2013 comedy film Girl, Boy, Bakla, Tomboy, which had recently regained media attention earlier that month. The teaser followed Vice Ganda's return on April 18 to It's Showtime after a month-long hiatus. The post posed the question, “Goodness Gracious, Everybody! Mga Kapamilya! Handa na ba ang ALL?” (lit. 'Kapamilya! are you all ready?'), alluding to the program's transition to ALLTV2 (thus marking its return to the channel frequencies where the program originally intended airing on, channels 2 and 16 in Mega Manila and regional channels, previously held by ABS-CBN until 2020) and its temporary departure from TV5 after the initial conclusion of its content partnership with ABS-CBN at the end of 2025.

Subsequently, the show confirmed that Everybody, Sing! would return for its fourth season. Two days later on April 25, it was revealed that the season will premiere on May 2, 2026.

Everybody, Sing! would later return to TV5 as part of a new simulcast agreement between ABS-CBN and TV5, thus further expanding its free-to-air television broadcast presence. The arrangement was first announced on June 27, 2026, with the program scheduled to resume airing on the network beginning with its 15th and 16th episodes on July 4 and 5, 2026, respectively. The agreement also includes the back-to-back broadcast of Kapamilya, Deal or No Deal, hosted by Luis Manzano.

=== Auditions ===
To audition for the show, individuals who are affiliated with a Songbayanan or a community group can participate by filling out an online application form provided by the show on its social media accounts.

=== Changes ===
Some changes have been made for this season:

- Reduced number of contestants: The contestant pool has been decreased from 100 in the previous season to 50, matching the total used in the second season.
- Set change: The stage design now features a predominantly pink color scheme.
- Updated graphics: The season introduces a refreshed title card and updated visual graphics.
- New games: A new mini-game, Singko Blanko, was introduced this season, in which a celebrity player and four players from the group attempt to complete five lines of an assigned song for a chance to win up to ₱200,000.
- Co-hosts: Comedians were allowed to interact with the players for the first time.
- Resident jammers: Substitutes for the resident bands’ vocalists, typically assigned to perform songs with high notes.
- Doubled individual cash prize: For the first time in the series, if all players correctly completed their assigned lines in a game, their individual cash prize was doubled to ₱2,000.

== Episodes overview ==
Legend

The Songbayanan received the highest possible amount as their winning prize in the jackpot round (₱1,000,000 or more).
The Songbayanan did not receive the highest possible amount as their winning prize in the jackpot round.
The Songbayanan did not receive any amount as their winning prize in the jackpot round.
No data.

List of aired, cancelled and upcoming episodes of Everybody, Sing! Season 4
Episode		Songbayanan (Community Group)	Prize won	AGB Nielsen Ratings (NUTAM People)	Ref.
No.	Airing date	Songbayanan (Community Group)	Prize won	AGB Nielsen Ratings (NUTAM People)	Ref.
2026 Episodes
1	May 2, 2026	50 Calumpit, Bulacan Residents (Flooded Community)	₱1,060,000	2.3%	
2	May 3, 2026	50 Calumpit, Bulacan Residents (Flooded Community)	₱1,060,000	2.3%	
3	May 9, 2026	50 Haligi ng Palengke (Wet Market/Palengke Vendors)	₱120,000	2.7%	
4	May 10, 2026	50 Haligi ng Palengke (Wet Market/Palengke Vendors)	₱120,000	2.0%	
5	May 16, 2026	50 Choir Members (Note: Referred mononymously on-air as “Choir.”)	₱200,000	2.9%	
6	May 17, 2026	50 Choir Members	₱200,000	–	
7	May 23, 2026	50 Virtual Assistants	₱180,000	–	
8	May 24, 2026	50 Virtual Assistants	₱180,000	1.9%	
9	May 30, 2026	50 TNVS Drivers	₱1,020,000	2.3%	
10	May 31, 2026	50 TNVS Drivers	₱1,020,000	2.1%	
11	June 6, 2026	50 Generation X and Millennial Singles	₱220,000 (Note: Excluding additional cash prize given by Vice Ganda.)	2.7%	
12	June 7, 2026	50 Generation X and Millennial Singles	₱220,000	1.8%	
13	June 13, 2026	50 Food Bazaar Crew	₱180,000		
14	June 14, 2026	50 Food Bazaar Crew	₱180,000		
15	July 4, 2026	50 Online Couples	₱1,020,000		
16	July 5, 2026	50 Online Couples	₱1,020,000		
17	July 11, 2026	50 Mag-Lolo at Mag-Lola (Note: This episode was supposed to air on June 20 and 21 but was rescheduled to air on July 11 and 12.) (Grandparents and Grandchildren)	₱200,000	4.0%	
18	July 12, 2026	50 Mag-Lolo at Mag-Lola (Grandparents and Grandchildren)	₱200,000	2.7%	
19	August 22, 2026	50 Event Hosts and Performers	₱200,000		
20	August 23, 2026	50 Event Hosts and Performers	₱200,000		
21	September 5, 2026	50 Mag-Best Friends (Note: Also referred to as "Mag-BFF's" (Best Friend Forever).)	₱200,000		
22	September 6, 2026	50 Mag-Best Friends	₱200,000		
23	September 19, 2026	50 Baristas (Coffee Shop Employees)	₱200,000		
24	September 20, 2026	50 Baristas (Coffee Shop Employees)	₱200,000		
25	October 3, 2026	50 Baseco, Manila Residents (Note: Also referred to as "Baseco Compound Residents".)	₱100,000		
26	October 4, 2026	50 Baseco, Manila Residents	₱100,000		

=== Re-runs ===
Some episodes may be rebroadcast after their initial airing date.

List of re-run episodes of Everybody, Sing! Season 4
Episode		Songbayanan	AGB Nielsen Ratings (NUTAM People)
No.	Re-broadcast date	Songbayanan	AGB Nielsen Ratings (NUTAM People)
1	June 20, 2026	50 Haligi ng Palengke	
2	June 21, 2026	50 Haligi ng Palengke	
3	June 27, 2026	50 Choir Members	
4	June 28, 2026	50 Choir Members	
5	July 18, 2026	50 Virtual Assistants	
6	July 19, 2026	50 Virtual Assistants	
7	July 25, 2026	50 Generation X and Millennial Singles	
8	July 26, 2026	50 Generation X and Millennial Singles	
9	August 1, 2026	50 Calumpit, Bulacan Residents	3.3%
10	August 2, 2026	50 Calumpit, Bulacan Residents	2.7%
11	August 8, 2026	50 Food Bazaar Crew	
12	August 9, 2026	50 Food Bazaar Crew	
13	August 15, 2026	50 TNVS Drivers	
14	August 16, 2026	50 TNVS Drivers	
15	August 29, 2026	50 Mag-Lolo at Mag-Lola	
16	August 30, 2026	50 Mag-Lolo at Mag-Lola	
17	September 12, 2026	50 Online Couples	
18	September 13, 2026	50 Online Couples	
19	September 26, 2026	50 Event Hosts and Performers	
20	September 27, 2026	50 Event Hosts and Performers	

== Gameplay ==
Each week, a community group known as the Songbayanan plays five games—two on Saturday and three on Sunday—with each game played by a group chosen by the ChooSera. After the first two games on Saturday, a mini jackpot round (Singko Blanko) is played, giving the group a chance to win a bonus prize and earn additional time for their jackpot timer, which will be used in the final round on Sunday. Each correct answer contributes two to four seconds to the jackpot timer, and each player receives ₱1,000. In this season, if a SONGpu achieves a perfect score, each member receives ₱2,000, double the usual amount. If a contestant fails to respond or gives an incorrect line, their turn is skipped, and the song continues until all players have exhausted their attempts. On Sunday, after the remaining three games, the group proceeds to the final jackpot round (Everybody GuesSing), where they must correctly guess all 10 songs within their accumulated time; for this season, every correct answer is now worth ₱20,000 and if successful, they win an additional ₱1,000,000.

The games that are in play for this season are:

- Sing In The Blank
- EngliSing ang Lyrics
- TagaliSing
- PicSing a Broken Song
- The ChooSing One
- ReverSing
- Lip-Sing
- A-B-Sing!
- Ayu-Sing Mo!
- Lights, Camera, Act-Sing
- Sing Tunog

=== Singko Blanko ===
Singko Blanko (lit. 'five blanks') is the pre-jackpot game played at the end of the Saturday episode, where five participants or SINGko—four group members or RepreSINGtatives and one celebrity guest—attempt to complete five lines of a selected song, each containing five missing words. Each player supplies one word per line in sequence, starting from the leftmost player to the rightmost. The celebrity guest selects the four group members who will participate in the mini-game.

Successfully completing one line earns ₱20,000 and an additional one second for the jackpot round. If all five lines are completed correctly, the group wins ₱200,000 and gains an extra 10 seconds for their jackpot round timer.

List of Singko Blanko results
Episode	Celebrity guest	Players	Song played	No. of correct lines	Equivalent		Ref.
Episode	Celebrity guest	Players	Song played	No. of correct lines	Addtl. time	Bonus prize	Ref.
1	Bela Padilla (player 3)	Nilo (player 1); Jessica (player 2); Kulas (player 4); Denise (player 5)	"Pare Ko" (Eraserheads)	3 out of 5	3 secs.	₱60,000	
3	Kyle Echarri (player 2)	Jenny (player 1); Beth (player 3); Joy (player 4); Wilma (player 5)	"Wala Na Bang Pag-Ibig" (Jaya)	3 out of 5	3 secs.	₱60,000	
5	Lella Ford and Joaquin Arce (Note: Lella and Joaquin competed as a single contestant, with Joaquin being the first to play.) (player 3)	Jian (player 1); Leng (player 2); Kel (player 4); Ian (player 5)	"Mundo" (IV of Spades)	2 out of 5	2 secs.	₱40,000	
7	Donny Pangilinan (player 3)	Patty (player 1); Judy (player 2); Kean (player 4); Jhez (player 5)	"Mula sa Puso" (Jovit Baldivino)	1 out of 5	1 sec.	₱20,000	
9	Ralph de Leon (player 1)	Nuno (player 2); Eret (player 3); Emm (player 4); Yani (player 5)	"Forever's Not Enough" (Sarah Geronimo)	1 out of 5	1 sec.	₱20,000	
11	Karla Estrada (player 1)	Roy (player 2); Joey (player 3); Marilou (player 4); Andeng (player 5)	"Halik" (Aegis)	2 out of 5	2 secs.	₱40,000	
13	Brent Manalo (player 1)	Janeth (player 2); Latek (player 3); Noufa (player 4); Mon (player 5)	"Ikaw ang Aking Mahal" (Brownman Revival)	1 out of 5	1 sec.	₱20,000	
15	Gladys Reyes (player 1)	Jenarld (player 2); Pau (player 3); Janna (player 4); Alexa (player 5)	"Dadalhin" (Regine Velasquez)	1 out of 5	1 sec.	₱20,000	
17	Fyang Smith and JM Ibarra (Note: Fyang and JM competed as a single contestant, with Fyang being the first to play.) (player 1)	Buboy (player 2); Angel (player 3); Jude (player 4); Mon (player 5)	"Harana" (Parokya ni Edgar)	3 out of 5	3 secs.	₱60,000	
19	Esnyr (player 1)	PJ (player 2); Miel (player 3); Rev (player 4); Hanz (player 5)	"Forevermore" (Side A)	2 out of 5	2 secs.	₱40,000	
21	Alexa Ilacad (player 1)	Ai (player 2); Michael (player 3); Dens (player 4); James (player 5)	"Nandito Ako" (Lea Salonga)	2 out of 5	2 secs.	₱40,000	
23	Jarren Garcia (player 1)	Haji (player 2); EJ (player 3); Jim (player 4); JK (player 5)	"Jopay" (Mayonnaise)	2 out of 5	2 secs.	₱40,000	
25	Janine Gutierrez and Jericho Rosales (player 1)	Caloy (player 2); Joy (player 3); Vince (player 4); Son (player 5)	"Ang Huling El Bimbo" (Eraserheads)	2 out of 5	2 secs.	₱40,000	

== Guests ==
Comedian guests (dubbed as KaSONGga) appear in both episodes for the week and join the audience during the warm-up song before the main game begins, while a different guest singer is featured in each episode. Additionally, one celebrity guest player joins the group in the Singko Blanko challenge (see article above).

=== Comedian guests ===
Comedian guests typically participate in one game each week—usually Lights, Camera, Act-Sing—which is featured in the Saturday episode. Beginning with Episode 16, however, they may also participate in one game during the Sunday episode, most commonly Lip-Sing.

Games and songs participated by comedian guests
Episode	Comedian guests	Game	Song played	Ref.
1	Iyah Mina and Petite	Lights, Camera, Act-Sing	"Making Love Out of Nothing at All" (Air Supply)	
3	Iyah Mina and Petite	Lights, Camera, Act-Sing	"Ale" (The Bloomfields)	
5	Iyah Mina and Petite	Lip-Sing	"Pantropiko" (BINI)	
7	Iyah Mina and Petite	Lip-Sing	"Saranggola" (Ben&Ben)	
9	Iyah Mina and Petite	Lights, Camera, Act-Sing	"Di Bale Na Lang" (Gary Valenciano)	
11	Iyah Mina and Petite	Lights, Camera, Act-Sing	"I'll Never Go" (Nexxus)	
13	Iyah Mina	Lip-Sing	"Maghihintay Ako" (Jona Viray)	
15	Iyah Mina and Lassy Marquez	Lights, Camera, Act-Sing	"Ewan" (Imago)	
16	Iyah Mina and Lassy Marquez	Lip-Sing	"Gusto Ko Nang Bumitaw" (Morissette)	
17	Iyah Mina and Lassy Marquez	Lights, Camera, Act-Sing	"Basang-Basa sa Ulan" (Aegis)	
18	Iyah Mina and Lassy Marquez	Lip-Sing	"With A Smile" (Regine Velasquez)	
19	Iyah Mina and Petite	Lip-Sing	"Tala" (Sarah Geronimo)	
21	Iyah Mina and Makki Lucino	Lip-Sing	"Palagi" (TJ Monterde and KZ Tandingan)	
23	Iyah Mina and Makki Lucino	Lights, Camera, Act-Sing	"Bakit Labis Kitang Mahal" (Lea Salonga)	
24	Iyah Mina and Makki Lucino	Lip-Sing	"Akin Ka Na Lang" (Morissette)	
25	Iyah Mina and Makki Lucino	Lights, Camera, Act-Sing	"Bakit Nga Ba Mahal Kita" (Gigi de Lana)	

=== Resident jammers ===
Every Saturday, a guest vocalist—referred to as a resident jammer, known for singing songs with high notes—is invited to perform a song featured in either one of the two games or Singko Blanko. In some instances, the resident jammer may also serve as a substitute for the resident band's vocalists during the final three games of each Sunday episode.

Games and songs participated by resident jammers
Episode	Guest singers	Game	Song played	Ref.
1	Ayegee Paredes	Sing in the Blank	"Luha" (Aegis)	
3	Ayegee Paredes	Singko Blanko	"Wala Na Bang Pag-Ibig" (Jaya)	
5	Ayegee Paredes	Sing in the Blank	"Ikaw ang Lahat sa Akin" (Regine Velasquez)	
7	Ayegee Paredes	Sing in the Blank	"Pangako" (Regine Velasquez)	
9	Ayegee Paredes	Sing in the Blank	"Never Ever Say Goodbye" (Regine Velasquez)	
11	Ayegee Paredes	Singko Blanko	"Halik" (Aegis)	
13	Makki Lucino	Sing in the Blank	"Total Eclipse of the Heart" (Bonnie Tyler)	
15	Makki Lucino	Singko Blanko	"Dadalhin" (Regine Velasquez)	
16	Makki Lucino	Lip-Sing	"Gusto Ko Nang Bumitaw" (Morissette)	
17	Makki Lucino	Lights, Camera, Act-Sing	"Basang-Basa sa Ulan" (Aegis)	
18	Makki Lucino	Lip-Sing	"With A Smile" (Regine Velasquez)	
19	Ayegee Paredes	Sing in the Blank	"Pangarap Ko ang Ibigin Ka" (Morissette)	
20	Ayegee Paredes	PicSing a Broken Song	"Lason Mong Halik" (Katrina Velarde)	
21	Ayegee Paredes	Sing in the Blank	"Because You Loved Me" (Celine Dion)	
22	Ayegee Paredes	Sing Tunog	"Umiiyak ang Puso" (Angeline Quinto)	
23	Ayegee Paredes	Sing in the Blank	"I Don't Want to Miss a Thing" (Regine Velasquez)	
24	Ayegee Paredes	Lip-Sing	"Akin Ka Na Lang" (Morissette)	
25	Ayegee Paredes	Lights, Camera, Act-Sing	"Bakit Nga Ba Mahal Kita" (Gigi de Lana)	
26	Ayegee Paredes	Sing Tunog	"Mahal Pa Rin Kita" (Angeline Quinto)	

=== Guest singers ===
Every Sunday, a different celebrity vocalist is featured as a guest performer and performs a song following the opening of the episode.

Three returning celebrity vocalists have participated, with their names stylized in italics:

- Jason Dy from Season 1 (25 Perya Performers, with Elha Nympha),
- Klarisse de Guzman from Season 2 (50 Mangingisda), and
- Yeng Constantino from Season 3 (100 2023 College Graduates).

Games and songs participated by guest singers
Episode	Guest singers	Game	Song played	Ref.
2	JM Dela Cerna and Marielle Montellano (JMielle)	Sing Tunog	"Ikaw" (Yeng Constantino)	
4	Kyla	The ChooSing One	"Hanggang Ngayon" (Kyla)	
6	Jason Dy	The ChooSing One	"Minsan Lang Kitang Iibigin" (Ariel Rivera)	
8	Klarisse de Guzman	The ChooSing One	"Ikaw ay Ako" (Klarisse de Guzman and Morissette)	
10	Maki	The ChooSing One	"Dilaw" (Maki)	
12	Carmelle Collado	The ChooSing One	"Stay" (Carol Banawa)	
14	BGYO	The ChooSing One	"Tumitigil ang Mundo" (BGYO)	
16	Yeng Constantino	The ChooSing One	"Hawak Kamay" (Yeng Constantino)	
18	Angeline Quinto	The ChooSing One	"Patuloy ang Pangarap" (Angeline Quinto)	
20	Maymay Entrata	The ChooSing One	"Amakabogera" (Maymay Entrata)	
22	Jamie Rivera	The ChooSing One	"I've Fallen For You" (Jamie Rivera)	
24	Jona Viray	The ChooSing One	"Pusong Ligaw" (Jona Viray)	
26	Lani Misalucha	The ChooSing One	"Tunay na Mahal" (Lani Misalucha)	
