= List of Kapamilya Online Live original programming =

The following is a list of programs streamed by Kapamilya Online Live, a web-based channel owned and operated by ABS-CBN Corporation. It exclusively livestreams local programs on YouTube and Facebook.

For the previously streamed shows, see the list of former Kapamilya Online Live streams.

== Current programming ==
Titles are listed in alphabetical order.

=== Live-gap programs ===
Programs are usually streamed during commercial breaks of each program.

- Showtime Online Ü

=== News and current affairs ===
- Rated Korina
- Ibang Level 'To!
- Philippines' Oddest Jobs
- Philippines' Most Haunted
- S.O.C.O.: Scene of the Crime Operatives
- TV Patrol
- TV Patrol Express
- TV Patrol Weekend
- The World Tonight
- Wow

=== Drama ===
- Maalaala Mo Kaya (1991–2022, 2025)
- Miss Behave (2026)
- Mommy Guard (2026)
- Sigabo (2026)
- Someone, Someday (2026)
- The Loyalty Game Level Up (2026)

=== Variety ===
- ASAP XP
- It's Showtime
- Vibe Plus Playback

=== Reality ===
- Pinoy Big Brother: Collab 3.0

=== Talk ===
- Gandang Mornings with Ate Koring
- Oh My Gan!
- Matteo G. Primetime
- The B-Side

=== Game ===
- Kapamilya, Deal or No Deal (season 6)

=== Film and special presentation ===
- Sunday Noontime Blockbusters

== See also ==
- List of programs distributed by ABS-CBN Studios
- List of programs broadcast by ABS-CBN
- List of Kapamilya Channel original programming
- List of A2Z original programming
- List of iWant original programming
- List of ABS-CBN Studios original drama series
