= Everybody, Sing! =

Philippine television game show

- Genre: Game show
- Created by: ABS-CBN Corporation
- Written by: Alvin Quizon; Francisco Miguel Nicanor; Hancel Arellano; Bernice Bautista
- Directed by: Jon Raymond Moll; Joanne Laygo; Jay Klio Bermudez
- Presented by: Vice Ganda
- Theme music composer: Kiko Salazar
- Opening theme: "Everybody, Sing!" by Vice Ganda
- Country of origin: Philippines
- Original languages: Filipino (primary); English (secondary)
- No. of seasons: 4
- No. of episodes: 126 (list of episodes)

Production
- Executive producers: Carlo Katigbak; Cory Vidanes; Laurenti Dyogi; Luis Andrada
- Producer: Marcus Vinuya
- Production locations: Studio 2, ABS-CBN Broadcasting Center, Diliman, Quezon City; ABS-CBN Soundstage, San Jose Del Monte, Bulacan (Pre-pandemic episodes)
- Cinematography: Riuben A. Ramilo
- Editors: Jerdumz Dumadag; Paul John Reyes
- Camera setup: Multiple-camera setup
- Running time: 75–80 minutes (including commercials)
- Production company: ABS-CBN Studios

Original release
- Network: Kapamilya Channel (Note: The game show originally planned to replace Gandang Gabi, Vice! and was set to start airing on March 15, 2020, on ABS-CBN; however, the game show was pre-empted due to the implementation of the community quarantine and threats of COVID-19 pandemic in the Philippines, and the network's shutdown after the cease-and-desist order of the National Telecommunications Commission on May 5, 2020.) (Note: The game show is also simulcast digitally on Kapamilya Online Live on Facebook and YouTube, as well as on free TV via a block-time agreement with A2Z, TV5 (for season 2 onwards), and All TV (through its ABS-CBN licensing; for season 4 onwards). It is also available worldwide via iWant and The Filipino Channel.)
- Release: June 5, 2021 – October 4, 2026

Everybody, Sing! is a Philippine television game show broadcast by Kapamilya Channel. Hosted by Vice Ganda, it premiered on the network's Yes Weekend line up on June 5, 2021.

== Gameplay ==
Before the show was pre-empted, there can be 100 individuals in a community group, and a community group can win as much as ₱2,000,000, to be shared by everyone. Due to the COVID-19 pandemic in the Philippines and ABS-CBN's franchise renewal controversy, numerous changes were implemented.

A community group consisting of 25, 50, or 100 individuals with ages ranging from 18 to 59, dubbed as the "Songbayanan" (Songmmunity, from song and sambayanan community), will be divided equally into five or ten rows, (Note: Previously, before the game show was pre-empted, the number of individuals who can compete in a community group was 100. It was then lowered to 25 during the first season due to the COVID-19 restrictions and guidelines. Both the number of players and the winning jackpot (50 players and ₱1,000,000) was doubled in the second season. The original number of players and winning jackpot (which increased to more than ₱2,000,000) was implemented on the third season.) whose each row is referred to as "SINGko" (transl. five, lit. 'five songs') or "SONGpu" (transl. ten, lit. 'ten songs'). Each round, one row will be chosen by the "ChooSera" to play a particular game. Each game has a different set of mechanics; However, they have the same goal, each contestant has one attempt to complete a line of a song, they will receive ₱1,000 for each correct guess, and the community group gets an additional 2–4 seconds to their jackpot round timer. The more correct guesses the group has, the more chances of them winning the jackpot prize. The community group will then get to participate in the jackpot round (named "[Ultimate] Everybody GuesSing"), wherein the community group is tasked to name each song that is being played by the band. If they name all 10 songs (later 20 in the third season), they can share the winning jackpot of ₱500,000, ₱1,000,000, ₱2,000,000, or more.

=== Introduced on Season 1 ===
These are the games that were first featured in the series' premiere. Some of them were changed in later seasons to accommodate the twists of each season.

==== Sing in the Blank ====
The initial game played in the show, the main objective of this game is to sing the missing lyrics and fill in the blank. The melody or singing style does not impact the answer; the focus is on providing the correct lyrics of the song. Each correct answer in this game is worth 2 seconds towards the jackpot timer, and the player will receive ₱1,000.

==== PicSing a Broken Song ====
This game follows the completion of "Sing in the Blank" and aims to "fix" a "broken song" by utilizing picture clues displayed on the screen, allowing players to accumulate extra time for the jackpot round. Each correct answer in this game is worth 2 seconds towards the jackpot timer, and the player will receive ₱1,000.

==== EngliSing ang Lyrics ====
EngliSing ang Lyrics focuses on translation, where the selected group is tasked with converting Tagalog words into their English counterparts. The song performed by the resident band will be in the English language. Each correct answer in this game is worth 2 seconds towards the jackpot timer, and the player will receive ₱1,000.

==== TagaliSing ====
TagaliSing presents an intriguing twist as it serves as the antithesis of EngliSing ang Lyrics. In this game, the chosen row of participants will be tasked with translating English words into Tagalog equivalents. The song performed by the resident band will be in the Tagalog language. Each correct answer in this game is worth 2 seconds towards the jackpot timer, and the player will receive ₱1,000.

==== The ChooSing One ====
The ChooSing One involves choosing the correct set of lyrics. Two choices will be presented, one being right and the other wrong. Each correct answer in this game is worth 2 seconds towards the jackpot timer, and the player will receive ₱1,000.

==== ReverSing ====
ReverSing is a challenge to transpose one reversed line of a song lyric back to their correct position. For the third season, each player will be given two reversed lines instead of the usual one line to transpose; in order for this order to be correct, the player must sing the exact lyrics of those missing lyrics. Each correct answer in this game is worth 4 seconds towards the jackpot timer, and the player will receive ₱1,000.

==== Lip-Sing ====
Lip-Sing involves players accurately guessing the lyrics by watching a video clip of a lip syncing the correct lyrics, while the audio is muted. It was introduced during the "25 Street Vendors" episode of season 1. For the third season, a celebrity guest is also tasked with guessing the missing lyric (note that the celebrity guests are not given the answer; they must also guess what the answer is). It is up to the player whether or not to trust the celebrity guest. For the fourth season, the celebrity guests are no longer guessing the missing lyric. The correct answers are already given for them to lip sync and the players will have to guess it. Each correct answer in this game is worth 2 seconds (previously 4 seconds) towards the jackpot timer, and the player will receive ₱1,000.

==== Vice Sing Ganda ====
Vice Sing Ganda is entirely dedicated to home viewers. Vice Ganda will engage the audience by asking a thought-provoking question, which is usually related to his costume or the Songbayanan at play. To win a cash prize of ₱5,000, viewers must post their response on X and Facebook using the following format: "Vice Sing Ganda <the letter of their answer (A or B)> + the current episode's hashtag," which is displayed in the lower-left corner of the screen. Vice will reveal the correct answer after a commercial break, followed by the announcement of the episode's home winner. The winner of that episode will then be asked to wait for the official text from the show's social media accounts before claiming their prize.

=== Introduced on Season 2 ===
==== A-B-Sing ====
A-B-Sing tasked its players in singing the complete lyrics using syllables as a clue. The clue provided by the resident band is determined by the number of syllables required to complete the missing word. For instance, if the missing lyric is "singing", the resident band will sing "S-S" as the clue. Each correct answer in this game is worth 2 seconds towards the jackpot timer, and the player will receive ₱1,000.

==== Ayu-Sing Mo ====
Ayu-Sing Mo requires players to arrange a set of four jumbled lyrics into the correct sequence. This minigame serves as an alternative to the ReverSing segment and was featured in the "50 Funeral & Cemetery Workers" episode on October 29, 2022. The objective of this game is to arrange the lyrics in the correct sequence. Each correct answer in this game is worth 4 seconds towards the jackpot timer, and the player will receive ₱1,000.

==== Singko Segundo Challenge ====
The Singko Segundo Challenge (lit. 'Five-Second Challenge') is a mini-game that is played before the jackpot round. Introduced and only used on the second season, the purpose of this challenge is to give the Songbayanan an opportunity to add 5 seconds to their jackpot timer. After all the groups have played their respective games, the Songbayanan will select a representative known as the Repre-SING-tative for the pre-jackpot round. Once the representative is chosen, their task is to guess the song sung by Vice Ganda, using only a relevant word based on the Songbayanan. For instance, if the Songbayanan are beauticians, the word that Vice will sing will be "kilay" ("eyebrow"). Vice Ganda will give his signal to the representative to provide their answer after he finishes singing the tune of the song.

=== Introduced on Season 3 ===
==== Lights, Camera, Act-Sing! ====
Lights, Camera, Act-Sing! is a game that involves players guessing the song lyric based on the live actions provided by the celebrity guest. The group in play must figure out what the missing song lyric is. The song will continue to be played by the resident band until the celebrity guest acts out what the missing lyric is. Each correct answer in this game is worth 2 seconds towards the jackpot timer, and the player will receive ₱1,000.

==== Sing-Tunog ====
Sing-Tunog is a game that involves the player finding the correct song lyric by listening to a word that is similar to the actual song lyric as a clue. The goal is for the player to correctly guess the song lyric based on the clue. Each correct answer in this game is worth 2 seconds towards the jackpot timer, and the player will receive ₱1,000.

=== Introduced on Season 4 ===
==== Singko Blanko ====
Introduced as the new pre-jackpot round in this season. Singko Blanko (lit. 'Five Blanks') involves four members of the Songbayanan and a celebrity guest player, taking turns in guessing a line consists of five missing lyrics one at a time. Every correct line they will guess is worth ₱20,000 and 1 second to be added to the total time for the jackpot round, and if they guess all five lines correctly, they will receive ₱200,000 and 10 seconds will be added for the Everybody GuesSing round.

=== Everybody GuesSing? ===
25 Massage Therapists (pictured) during the Everybody, GuesSing segment of Everybody, Sing!

After completing five or ten games, the Songbayanan will participate in the jackpot round called "Everybody GuesSing?". In this round, they need to correctly guess 10 (later 20 in third season) song titles to win the jackpot prize. The time available for this round will be the cumulative jackpot seconds earned by the five or ten rows during the preliminary rounds.

For the first, second and fourth seasons, the countdown of their accumulated jackpot timer will begin once the resident band starts playing the first song. Their objective in this final game is to win the jackpot round. Each of the players is allowed to provide an answer only once by pressing their individual buzzer. Once they have made their response, they cannot answer again. Each correct guess is valued at ₱5,000 for the first season which includes ₱100,000 for the special episodes, ₱10,000 for the second season and third season, and ₱20,000 for the fourth season. The total prize money they will take home will be multiplied by the number of correct answers. For example, if the Songbayanan guessed eight correct song titles, they would receive ₱40,000, with each player receiving ₱1,600. However, if a player's guess is incorrect, they can make another guess only if there is sufficient time remaining. The game concludes under two conditions: either all players have used their attempts or there is no remaining time.

However, if they manage to guess all 10 song titles correctly, they can take home the jackpot prize worth ₱500,000 or ₱1,000,000, with each player receiving ₱20,000.

==== Ultimate Everybody, GuesSing? ====
The third season's jackpot round was changed: instead of the usual ten songs to guess, each Songbayanan must aim to guess twenty songs over the course of the weekend. Ultimate Everybody, GuesSing is divided into two rounds, of which each round will be aired before each episode ends. Still, all players are only allowed to answer once each round, and each correct guess of a song title earns the Songbayanan ₱10,000.

Round 1

For the first round, the Songbayanan unanimously decides how many songs they will try to guess using the accumulated jackpot time from the first five games (up to a maximum of ten). The group's leader (dubbed as Repre-SING-tative) will confirm on how many songs they think that they can guess for this round. If they hit their goal, their prize will be doubled. For example, if the Songbayanan decides to guess seven songs and correctly guesses those seven songs within their time limit, they will receive ₱140,000.

Once they have set their target, they must guess the song titles using a word based on the Songbayanan, similar to the Singko Segundo challenge of the second season. Furthermore, the number of unanswered song titles made in this round will be revealed and will be added to the number of songs the Songbayanan must guess in the second round the following day. If the Songbayanan achieves their target but does not fully use their timer, the unused time will be added to the next round.

Round 2

For the second round, now using the accumulated jackpot time that they have gathered from the last five games (and the unused time from the first round if they have any), the Songbayanan must answer the remaining song titles on their board. Also, the Songbayanan is tasked to place a Golden Time Bonus to a song number of their choice, which, when achieved by guessing the correct song title when the selected song number containing the bonus is approached and played, will add ten additional seconds to their jackpot timer. The Songbayanan will decide where they will put the bonus on the board before starting the round, and their leader will confirm to Vice on where they will place the bonus.

This time, the resident band will not sing the song using a word based on the Songbayanan like in the first round; instead, they will just play the instrumental version of the song in play. Once the Songbayanan successfully answers all twenty song titles, they will add ₱2,000,000 to their pot, including the pot money that they have accumulated during the previous round, which will be shared with everybody. A potential bank of ₱2,200,000 can be banked by a Songbayanan if they reach their maximum target of ten correct song titles during the first round and if they answer the remaining ten song titles on the second round.

== Cast ==
Current host

- Vice Ganda

Resident band

- Six Part Invention
  - Kaye Malana Cantong (Lead Vocalist)
  - Rey Cantong (Lead Vocalist and Guitars)
  - Tag Cantong (Drummer and Percussionist)
  - Cookie Taylo (Bass)

Guest Vocalists

- Elha Nympha (25 Perya Performers episode)
- Jason Dy (25 Perya Performers and 50 Choir Members episodes)
- Erik Santos (50 Sales Agents episode)
- Klarisse de Guzman (50 Mangingisda and 50 Virtual Assistants episodes)
- Darren Espanto (50 Dentists episode)
- KZ Tandingan (100 Pulis episode)
- Nyoy Volante (100 Sanitation Workers episode)
- Ogie Alcasid (100 Mag-Ama episode)
- Sheryn Regis (100 Manila Fire Survivors episode)
- Marco Sison (100 Engaged Couples episode)
- Adie (100 Sari-Sari Store Sellers episode)
- Dingdong Avanzado (100 Tattoo & Body Piercing Artists episode)
- Ice Seguerra (100 Nurses episode)
- Bituin Escalante (100 Government Workers episode)
- Jireh Lim (100 Mangangalakal episode)
- Geneva Cruz (100 Dancers episode)
- Yeng Constantino (100 2023 College Graduates and 50 Online Couples episodes)
- Bugoy Drilon (100 Pawnshop & Money Remittance Tellers episode)
- Paolo & Miguel Benjamin of Ben&Ben (100 Band Members episode)
- Khel Pangilinan (100 Taguig Tenement Community episode)
- Moira Dela Torre (100 Pharmacists & Botika Employees episode)
- Barbie Almalbis (100 Solo Parents episode)
- Nonoy Zuñiga (100 Magbabalut episode)
- Jed Madela (100 Divisoria Stall Sellers episode)
- Ayegee Paredes (Season 4 Resident Jammer)
- Makki Lucino (Season 4 Resident Jammer)
- JM dela Cerna & Marielle Montellano (50 Calumpit, Bulacan Flooded Community Residents episode)
- Kyla (50 Haligi ng Palengke episode)
- Maki (50 TNVS Drivers episode)
- Carmelle Collado (50 Gen X and Millennial Singles episode)
- BGYO (50 Food Bazaar Crew episode)
- Angeline Quinto (50 Mag-Lolo at Mag-Lola episode)
- Maymay Entrata (50 Event Hosts and Performers episode)
- Jamie Rivera (50 Mag-Best Friends episode)
- Jona Viray (50 Baristas episode)
- Lani Misalucha (50 Baseco, Manila Residents episode)

Celebrity Guests

- Beki Velo (Season 3 Regular Celebrity Guest)
- Didong† (100 Sanitation Workers, Pharmacists & Botika Employees, Solo Parents, and Magbabalut episodes)
- Divine Tetay (100 Pulis episode)
- Petite Brokovich (Seasons 3 & 4 Regular Celebrity Guest)
- Iyah Mina (Season 4 Regular Celebrity Guest)
- Bela Padilla (50 Calumpit, Bulacan Flooded Community Residents episode)
- Kyle Echarri (50 Haligi ng Palengke episode)
- Lella Ford and Joaquin Arce (50 Choir Members episode)
- Donny Pangilinan (50 Virtual Assistants episode)
- Ralph de Leon (50 TNVS Drivers episode)
- Karla Estrada (50 Gen X and Millennial Singles episode)
- Brent Manalo (50 Food Bazaar Crew episode)
- Gladys Reyes (50 Online Couples episode)
- Fyang Smith and JM Ibarra (50 Mag-Lolo at Mag-Lola episode)
- Esnyr (50 Event Hosts and Performers episode)
- Alexa Ilacad (50 Mag-Best Friends episode)
- Jarren Garcia (50 Baristas episode)
- Janine Gutierrez and Jericho Rosales (50 Baseco, Manila Residents episode)

Dancers (100 Songbayanan Special)

- Vanessa Yap
- Jewel Andrei Baldeo
- Ciara Denise Cabayao
- Ruth Paga
- Dominique Mailloux
- Angelica Madayag
- Angela Brimner
- Angelica Brimner
- Chemylin Mae Magsino
- Nikka Brillantes

== Development and production ==
The Philippine game show was first revealed in early-2020 as an upcoming show, that was supposed to air in the same year as part of ABS-CBN original programming. It was also later revealed that the game show is set to premiere on March 15, 2020, on ABS-CBN, replacing Vice Ganda's late-night comedy talk show Gandang Gabi, Vice!; however, on March 13, 2020, Vice Ganda announced in Piling Lucky, a segment of It's Showtime, that the production of the game show is postponed, in addition to that, the game show's pilot episode on March 15, 2020, is cancelled due to safety and health concerns brought by the COVID-19 pandemic.

Kapamilya, due to the ongoing public health issue brought by the COVID-19 pandemic, Everybody, Sing! ... the new show that I will be hosting this Sunday ... we are reaching out that the premiere of the pilot episode of Everybody, Sing! is temporarily postponed this Sunday, on March 15 ... until the situation caused by COVID-19 has not calmed down.

— Vice Ganda, announcing the postponement of his upcoming game show on It's Showtime.

== Release ==
=== Promotion ===
Before the game show was pre-empted, Vice Ganda revealed in the final episode of Gandang Gabi, Vice! on March 8, 2020, that his late-night comedy talk show will now be replaced with his game show, Everybody Sing. On May 30, 2021, Vice Ganda appeared as a celebrity guest in the final episode of the third season of Your Face Sounds Familiar to promote his game show, that will replace the singing and impersonation competition. On September 18, 2022, Vice Ganda appeared on the second season finale of Idol Philippines to promote the musical game show's new season. His appearance featured a performance of the song "Pearly Shells", where he would later give away one-thousand pesos to audience members who would sing the correct lyrics of the song when approached.

=== Broadcast ===
The game show was first aired from June 5 to October 10, 2021 on Kapamilya Channel, and A2Z replacing the third season of Your Face Sounds Familiar and was replaced by Pinoy Big Brother: Kumunity Season 10. On February 28, 2022, Vice Ganda himself on his noontime show It's Showtime confirmed the second season of the program. The second season aired on September 24, 2022, replacing the second season of Idol Philippines. The show's social media accounts posted a quick teaser of the show's set on May 14, 2023, and then announced a day later that the show was renewed for its third season. The third season aired on June 3, 2023, replacing the fifth season of The Voice Kids, and was replaced by the third season of The Voice Teens. The fourth season aired on May 2, 2026, replacing the fourth season of Your Face Sounds Familiar, and was replaced by the reruns of Maalaala Mo Kaya.

The game show is also available in global subscription television network, The Filipino Channel, and in online-streaming platforms, Kapamilya Online Live and iWant.

== Series overview ==
| Season | Episodes | Originally released | | No. of players | No. of featured groups | No. of winners | Maximum jackpot prize | Notes |
| Season | Episodes | First released | Last released | No. of players | No. of featured groups | No. of winners | Maximum jackpot prize | Notes |
|---|---|---|---|---|---|---|---|---|
| 1 | 36 | June 5, 2021 | October 10, 2021 | 25–100 | 33 | 7 | ₱500,000/₱2,000,000 | (Note: The last six aired episodes, dubbed the “100 Songbayanan Special,” were taped before the COVID-19 pandemic and featured three groups competing with 100 players, 10 games, and a ₱2,000,000 jackpot prize. The special served as the season finale of Season 1.) |
| 2 | 26 | September 24, 2022 | February 19, 2023 | 50 | 26 | 5 | ₱1,000,000 | (Note: Doubled the number of players to 50 and the jackpot prize to ₱1,000,000, while also doubling the prize per correct answer to ₱10,000. It was the first season to introduce two new games, A-B-Sing and Ayu-Sing Mo, as well as the Singko Segundo Challenge, in which a group’s selected representative could earn an additional five seconds on their jackpot timer by correctly guessing a song title hummed by the host.) |
| 3 | 38 | June 3, 2023 | February 11, 2024 | 100 | 19 | 5 | ₱2,200,000 | (Note: Further doubled the number of players to 100, returning to the original number of players in the first format, and increased the cash prize to ₱2,000,000. It introduced Lights, Camera, Act-Sing and Sing Tunog, and was the first season to feature weekly guest appearances by both comedians and celebrity singers. The season also introduced a two-part jackpot round, with the first part giving the group a chance to double their winnings and earn a ₱200,000 bonus. It was also the first to introduce the Golden Time Bonus, allowing the group to add an additional 10 seconds to their jackpot timer, which could only be used during the second part of the jackpot round.) |
| 4 | 26 | May 2, 2026 | October 4, 2026 | 50 | 13 | 3 | ₱1,200,000 | (Note: It was the first season to introduce the Singko Blanko challenge, in which a celebrity guest player and four selected players from the group attempted to complete five lines of an assigned song for a chance to win ₱200,000, similar to the first round of the jackpot round in the third season. It was also the first season to award each player a doubled individual prize of ₱2,000 per correct answer if all players correctly completed their assigned lines in a game. Additionally, it was the first season to feature resident jammers, with the comedians assigned to each episode also serving as its co-hosts.) |

== Episodes ==
As of October 4, 2026, Everybody, Sing! has aired a total of 202 episodes, comprising 126 original broadcasts (including the six special episodes) and 76 re-runs.

A total of 20 Songbayanan groups have successfully won the jackpot prize. Of these, seven groups won during the first season, five during the second season, five during the third season, and three during the fourth season.

The show has awarded the following total amounts of money to all of its participants: for the first season, the show gave away ₱6,635,000; for the second season, the show gave away ₱6,230,000; for the third season, the show gave away ₱13,280,000; and for the fourth season, the show gave away ₱4,900,000. When these amounts are summed up, the total prize money given out by the show amounts to ₱31,045,000. The total amounts include both jackpot and non-jackpot winners.

== 100 Songbayanan Special ==
The show aired its original iteration of the series dubbed as the 100 Songbayanan Special after the 25 Perya Performers episode starting on September 25, 2021, and was aired for three consecutive weeks until October 10, 2021, in celebration for the finale of the first season. The episodes shown were taped before the COVID-19 pandemic and the ABS-CBN shutdown and legislative franchise denial.

The game was originally played with five games, consisting of two rounds per game that were played by two different groups, whose each row is referred to as SONGpu (lit. 'ten'), and the group that will play each game will be still randomly chosen by ChooSera. Once a group has been chosen to play a game, each correct lyric that a contestant gives will receive ₱1,000 if he or she sings his/her assigned line correctly (that will be also instantly given to them after their game) and adds one or two seconds to their jackpot timer. The first five (or in rare cases, six) rounds will be aired on a Saturday episode, while the remaining five (or four) rounds and the Jackpot round will be played on a Sunday episode.

Once all ten groups have played, the Songbayanan will then proceed to the Jackpot round, where all of them must accurately name ten song titles using their collected time from the preliminary rounds. The same mechanics are in place as with the modified version, where all contestants are only allowed to answer once. Once they have touched their individual buzzer to respond, they are unable to do so again. ₱100,000 is given to the Songbayanan per every song title that they correctly guess. Just like the modified version, the basis for their take-home prize money will be multiplied to the number of their correct answers. For example, if a Songbayanan had only guessed 7 correct song titles, then they will only take home ₱700,000 and each contestant will only receive ₱7,000 each. However, if the Songbayanan correctly guesses all ten song titles without fully consuming their jackpot timer, they will take home and divide equally the jackpot prize of ₱2,000,000, with each individual receiving ₱20,000 each.

The 100 Taal survivors were the only group that took home and divided equally the ₱2,000,000 jackpot prize. Their episode was aired during the final week of the first season, which was on October 9–10, 2021.

This format was brought back for the third season, with the only modifications being that each group will play a particular game, the jackpot round was split into two rounds, and the maximum jackpot prize that each group is potentially eligible to win was raised by ₱200,000.

== Reception ==
During the pilot episode of the game show on June 5, 2021, the episode received an 1.8% rating from AGB Nielsen Philippines, and the hashtag #EverybodySing became the top trending hashtag in Twitter nationwide. LionhearTV, an entertainment news website, wrote "ABS-CBN's new singing game show [Everybody Sing] is a blast of fun, excitement, and inspiration, as it unites Filipino communities and working groups from every walk of life." They also added, "There has been a bunch of game shows with similar formats, but this one differs in its unique motive to unite community groups, and by highlighting the undying 'Bayanihan' spirit."

=== Accolades ===
| Year | Award | Category | Nominee(s) | Result | Ref. |
|---|---|---|---|---|---|
| 2021 | Asian Academy Creative Awards | Best Entertainment Program Host | Vice Ganda | Won | |
| 2021 | Asian Academy Creative Awards | Best Music/Dance Program | Everybody, Sing! | Nominated | |
| 2021 | Venice TV Awards | Light Entertainment | Everybody, Sing! | Nominated | |
| 2023 | ContentAsia Awards | Best Asian Original Game Show | Everybody, Sing! (season 2) | Won | |
| 2025 | PMPC Star Awards for Television | Best Game Show Host | Vice Ganda | Nominated | |
| 2025 | PMPC Star Awards for Television | Best Game Show | Everybody, Sing! | Nominated | |

== See also ==
- List of Kapamilya Channel original programming
- List of A2Z (TV channel) original programming
- List of All TV original programming
- List of TV5 original programming
