= Everybody, Sing! season 3 =

Everybody, Sing!
- Season 3
- Promotional poster
- Hosted by: Vice Ganda
- No. of contestants: 100
- No. of winners: 5
- No. of episodes: 38

Release
- Original network: Kapamilya Channel (Note: The show also airs on Kapamilya Online Live on YouTube and Facebook and through a blocktime agreement on A2Z (on delayed telecasts starting on November 5, 2023) and TV5.)
- Original release: June 3, 2023 – February 11, 2024

Season chronology
- ← Previous; Season 2 Next → Season 4

The third season of the musical game show Everybody, Sing! aired on the Kapamilya Channel with simulcasts on A2Z, TV5, and Kapamilya Online Live from June 3, 2023 to February 11, 2024, replacing the fifth season of The Voice Kids and was replaced by the third season of The Voice Teens.

== Overview ==
On May 14, 2023, a five-second video was posted on the show's social media accounts, teasing the upcoming season. The teaser showcased the show's set, and also revealed the stage and the microphones. Additionally, the video displayed the date "05.15.23" at the center, hinting that there will be an announcement about the show on May 15. After May 15, the show began posting teasers for the new season, with Vice claiming that this season will be "bigger than ever" a week before the show's premiere. The season then premiered on June 3 and 4, 2023.

=== Timeslot ===
The show aired every Saturday at 7:15 pm and Sunday at 7:00 pm on Kapamilya Channel, Kapamilya Online Live, A2Z and TV5, taking over the timeslot previously held by the fifth season of The Voice Kids. The show aired on a delayed telecast on A2Z to give way for the 2023–24 PBA season starting on November 5, 2023 until February 11, 2024.

=== Auditions ===
To audition for the show, individuals who are affiliated with a Songbayanan can participate by sending an email or direct message to the show's official social media accounts.

=== Changes ===
This season saw more changes than the previous season. The following changes were implemented:

Format

- Doubled number of participants: The maximum number of participants that can play was increased from twenty-five (25) in the first season to fifty (50) in the second season and one hundred (100) in this season, restoring the original number of participants since the show's debut in 2021.
- Doubled and increase of jackpot prize: The jackpot prize for a Songbayanan has been doubled from one million pesos (₱1,000,000) to two million pesos (₱2,000,000), with the possibility of exceeding the latter. Each player guarantees a potential cash prize of ₱20,000 or more, depending on the final result of their jackpot round.
- More interaction allowance: The face shields that appeared in the first and second seasons were removed to make way for the game room, which allowed Vice to be close to and interact with the players. Nonetheless, the show required all players to be fully vaccinated.

The changes were made possible due to the lowering of COVID-19 restrictions in the country.

Gameplay

- Celebrity guests: For the first time in the series, guest appearances will be weekly rather than every other week as they were in previous seasons. These guests may perform duets with or replace the resident bands' vocalists, or they may assist the host in providing clues for the answers during certain rounds.
- New games: Aside from the nine original games featured in previous seasons, two new games were added for this season: "Lights, Camera, Act-Sing" and "Sing-Tunog". Each group will participate in a specific game.
- Ultimate Everybody, GuesSing?: The jackpot round was divided into two parts, and the Songbayanan had a chance to win more than two million pesos (₱2,000,000).
- Golden Time Bonus: A revamped version of the Singko Segundo challenge of the previous season, each Songbayanan has a chance to add ten seconds to their timer in the jackpot round by correctly guessing the song title with the bonus attached.

== Episodes overview ==
Legend

The Songbayanan received the highest possible amount as their winning prize in the jackpot round (more than ₱2,000,000).
The Songbayanan did not receive the highest possible amount as their winning prize in the jackpot round.
The Songbayanan did not receive any amount as their winning prize in the jackpot round.
No data.

List of aired, cancelled and upcoming episodes of Everybody, Sing! Season 3
Episode		Songbayanan (Community Group)	Prize won	AGB Nielsen Ratings (NUTAM People)	Ref.
No.	Airing date	Songbayanan (Community Group)	Prize won	AGB Nielsen Ratings (NUTAM People)	Ref.
2023 Episodes
1	June 3, 2023	100 Pulis (Policemen & Policewomen)	₱150,000 (Note: Excluding additional cash prize given by Vice Ganda.)	5.4%	
2	June 4, 2023	100 Pulis (Policemen & Policewomen)	₱150,000	5.4%	
3	June 10, 2023	100 Sanitation Workers	₱230,000	6.0%	
4	June 11, 2023	100 Sanitation Workers	₱230,000	6.0%	
5	June 17, 2023	100 Mag-Ama (Fathers and Children)	₱2,140,000		
6	June 18, 2023	100 Mag-Ama (Fathers and Children)	₱2,140,000		
7	June 24, 2023	100 Manila Fire Survivors (May 2023 Sta. Cruz, Manila Fire Incident Survivors)	₱2,200,000		
8	June 25, 2023	100 Manila Fire Survivors (May 2023 Sta. Cruz, Manila Fire Incident Survivors)	₱2,200,000		
9	July 1, 2023	100 Engaged Couples	₱290,000	5.9%	
10	July 2, 2023	100 Engaged Couples	₱290,000		
11	July 8, 2023	100 Sari-Sari Store Sellers (Variety Store Sellers)	₱150,000		
12	July 9, 2023	100 Sari-Sari Store Sellers (Variety Store Sellers)	₱150,000		
13	July 15, 2023	100 Tattoo & Body Piercing Artists	₱180,000	6.1%	
14	July 16, 2023	100 Tattoo & Body Piercing Artists	₱180,000	6.7%	
15	July 29, 2023	100 Nurses	₱190,000	7.6%	
16	July 30, 2023	100 Nurses	₱190,000	6.5%	
17	August 5, 2023	100 Government Employees	₱180,000		
18	August 6, 2023	100 Government Employees	₱180,000		
19	September 2, 2023	100 Mangangalakal (Garbage Collectors)	₱2,200,000	6.2%	
20	September 3, 2023	100 Mangangalakal (Garbage Collectors)	₱2,200,000	7.2%	
21	September 9, 2023	100 Dancers	₱130,000	6.6%	
22	September 10, 2023	100 Dancers	₱130,000		
23	September 16, 2023	100 2023 College Graduates	₱210,000		
24	September 17, 2023	100 2023 College Graduates	₱210,000		
25	September 23, 2023	100 Pawnshop & Money Remittance Tellers	₱150,000	8.0%	
26	September 24, 2023	100 Pawnshop & Money Remittance Tellers	₱150,000	7.1%	
27	September 30, 2023	100 Band Members	₱170,000		
28	October 1, 2023	100 Band Members	₱170,000		
29	October 14, 2023	100 Taguig Tenement Community (Fort Bonifacio Tenement Occupants)	₱140,000	6.8%	
30	October 15, 2023	100 Taguig Tenement Community (Fort Bonifacio Tenement Occupants)	₱140,000	7.1%	
31	November 18, 2023	100 Pharmacists & Botika Employees (Licensed Pharmacists & Pharmacy Employees)	₱2,080,000		
32	November 19, 2023	100 Pharmacists & Botika Employees (Licensed Pharmacists & Pharmacy Employees)	₱2,080,000		
33	November 25, 2023	100 Solo Parents	₱270,000	6.2%	
34	November 26, 2023	100 Solo Parents	₱270,000	6.0%	
35	December 2, 2023	100 Magbabalut (Fertilized Bird Egg Vendors)	₱180,000	6.2%	
36	December 3, 2023	100 Magbabalut (Fertilized Bird Egg Vendors)	₱180,000	6.2%	
2024 Episodes
37	February 10, 2024	100 Divisoria Stall Sellers	₱2,040,000		
38	February 11, 2024	100 Divisoria Stall Sellers	₱2,040,000		

=== Re-runs ===
Some episodes may be rebroadcast after their initial airing date. This has occurred 18 times during the season, with one episode being re-broadcast twice (Engaged Couples).

List of re-run episodes of Everybody, Sing! Season 3
Episode		Songbayanan	AGB Nielsen Ratings (NUTAM People)
No.	Re-broadcast date	Songbayanan	AGB Nielsen Ratings (NUTAM People)
1	July 22, 2023	100 Mag-Ama	
2	July 23, 2023	100 Mag-Ama	
3	August 12, 2023	100 Engaged Couples	
4	August 13, 2023	100 Engaged Couples	
5	August 19, 2023	100 Manila Fire Survivors	6.5%
6	August 20, 2023	100 Manila Fire Survivors	6.7%
7	August 26, 2023	100 Sari-Sari Store Sellers	6.5%
8	August 27, 2023	100 Sari-Sari Store Sellers	5.8%
9	October 7, 2023	100 Tattoo & Body Piercing Artists	7.1%
10	October 8, 2023	100 Tattoo & Body Piercing Artists	7.3%
11	October 21, 2023	100 Nurses	6.3%
12	October 22, 2023	100 Nurses	6.3%
13	October 28, 2023	100 Sanitation Workers	
14	October 29, 2023	100 Sanitation Workers	
15	November 4, 2023	100 Government Employees	
16	November 5, 2023	100 Government Employees	
17	November 11, 2023	100 2023 College Graduates	6.1%
18	November 12, 2023	100 2023 College Graduates	
19	December 9, 2023	100 Pawnshop & Money Remittance Tellers	
20	December 10, 2023	100 Pawnshop & Money Remittance Tellers	
21	December 16, 2023	100 Band Members	5.0%
22	December 17, 2023	100 Band Members	5.1%
23	December 23, 2023	100 Mangangalakal	5.2%
24	December 24, 2023	100 Mangangalakal	3.2%
25	December 30, 2023	100 Pharmacists & Botika Employees	5.6%
26	December 31, 2023	100 Pharmacists & Botika Employees	3.1%
2024 Re-Runs
27	January 6, 2024	100 Taguig Tenement Community	
28	January 7, 2024	100 Taguig Tenement Community	
29	January 13, 2024	100 Pulis	6.8%
30	January 14, 2024	100 Pulis	6.3%
31	January 20, 2024	100 Magbabalut	6.4%
32	January 21, 2024	100 Magbabalut	5.1%
33	January 27, 2024	100 Solo Parents	6.2%
34	January 28, 2024	100 Solo Parents	5.6%
35	February 3, 2024	100 Engaged Couples	5.5%
36	February 4, 2024	100 Engaged Couples	5.7%

== Gameplay ==
Each week, a community group known as the Songbayanan will play in ten games; each game will be played by a group chosen by the ChooSera. This season features two new games in addition to the nine original games from the previous two seasons. Each correct answer contributes two to four seconds to the jackpot timer, and each player receives one thousand pesos (₱1,000). If a contestant does not respond or delivers an incorrect line, their line will be skipped, and the song will continue until all players have exhausted their attempts. Meanwhile, the jackpot round has been divided into two parts, which will be played before each episode concludes.

In each episodes broadcast, the first five games and the first round of the jackpot round are broadcast on Saturday, followed by the remaining five games and the final round of the jackpot round on Sunday. Every Sunday episode, TagaliSing and EngliSing ang Lyrics alternate as the first game of the episode and the sixth game to be played by each group.

Two of the original games that were featured in previous seasons (namely LipSing and ReverSing) were tweaked to accommodate the season's twists. Three of these games (all except for ReverSing) typically involve guest participation. Two new games (namely Lights, Camera, Act-Sing and Sing-Tunog) were first introduced on the first and second episodes, respectively.

=== LipSing ===
First introduced during the "25 Street Vendors" episode of season one, LipSing originally involved players guessing the lyrics by watching a video clip of a lip syncing the correct lyrics, while the audio is muted. For this season, a celebrity guest is also tasked with guessing the missing lyric. Note that the celebrity guests are not given the answer, they must also guess what the answer is. It is up to the player whether or not to trust the celebrity guest.

=== ReverSing ===
ReverSing is a game in which the players must transpose reversed lyrics back into their correct position. For this season, each player will be given two reversed lines instead of the usual one line to transpose; in order for this order to be correct, the player must sing the exact lyrics of those missing lyrics.

=== Lights, Camera, Act-Sing! ===
Lights, Camera, Act-Sing is a game that involves players guessing the song lyric based on the live actions provided by the celebrity guests.

=== Sing-Tunog ===
Sing-Tunog is a game that involves the player finding the correct song lyric by listening to a word that is similar to the actual song lyric as a clue. For example, if the missing lyric is "tanong" (question), the clue given may be "talong" (eggplant).

== Ultimate Everybody, GuesSing? ==
This season's jackpot round, renamed as Ultimate Everybody, GuesSing, introduces a notable change from the previous two seasons, while retaining consistent rules: each player is limited to responding to a song title they know once by pressing their individual buzzer, and subsequent responses are not allowed. In this season, each Songbayanan must undertake the challenge of guessing a total of twenty songs throughout the weekend. The jackpot round is split into two segments, with each round airing before the conclusion of its respective episode. Similar to the previous season, participants earn ₱10,000 for each accurate guess of a song title.

Round 1 (Bonus Round)

The Songbayanan will collectively determine the number of songs they aim to guess using the accumulated jackpot time from the first five games, with a maximum limit of ten songs. The group's leader, known as the "Repre-SING-tative," will confirm the number of songs they believe they can successfully guess in this round. If they reach their target, their prize will be doubled (For example, if the Songbayanan manages to accurately guess their target of seven songs within the given time limit, their prize will be doubled to ₱140,000.) Once the target is set, they must identify the song titles using a word based on the Songbayanan, similar to the Singko Segundo challenge from the previous season.

Additionally, the number of unanswered song titles in this round will be disclosed and added to the count of songs the Songbayanan must guess in the second round of the next episode. If the Songbayanan reaches their goal but doesn't fully utilize their timer, the remaining time will be carried over to the next round.

Round 2

Utilizing the accumulated jackpot time from the last five games, including any unused time from the first round, the Songbayanan must respond to the remaining song titles on their board. Additionally, the Songbayanan is assigned the task of incorporating a Golden Time Bonus to a chosen song number. Upon successfully guessing the correct song title when the designated song number with the bonus is played, ten seconds will be added to their jackpot timer. The placement of the bonus on the board is decided by the Songbayanan before the round commences with their second "Repre-SING-tative," and their leader will confirm this with Vice.

In this round, the resident band will not vocalize the song using a word based on the Songbayanan as in the first round; instead, they will play the instrumental version of the song in play. If the Songbayanan accurately answers all twenty song titles, they will be rewarded two million pesos (₱2,000,000) on top of their pot money from the previous round, which will be distributed among all participants.

Legend

The Songbayanan received the highest possible amount as their winning prize in the jackpot round (more than ₱2,000,000).
The Songbayanan reached their goal in the first round and doubled their prize money.
The Songbayanan did not receive the highest possible amount as their winning prize in the jackpot round.
The Songbayanan did not receive any amount as their winning prize in the jackpot round.
No data.

List of Everybody, Sing! Ultimate Everybody GuesSing results
Songbayanan	FIRST ROUND					SECOND ROUND						Final no. of guessed titles	Total prize won	Ref.
Songbayanan	Banked time (Note: Only includes banked time from the first five games.)	Target no. of titles (Note: The target is established by the group's leader, who then confirms it to the host.)	No. of guessed titles	Word used	Prize won	Banked time (Note: Includes unused time from previous round, accumulated time from the last five games, and the Golden Time Bonus (if claimed).)	Golden Time Bonus		Target no. of titles (Note: The number of songs the group must guess in the second round is determined by subtracting 20 from the number of songs they guessed in the previous round.)	No. of guessed titles	Prize won	Final no. of guessed titles	Total prize won	Ref.
Songbayanan	Banked time	Target no. of titles	No. of guessed titles	Word used	Prize won	Banked time	Song no. assigned	Claimed?	Target no. of titles	No. of guessed titles	Prize won	Final no. of guessed titles	Total prize won	Ref.
Pulis	60 secs.	10	3	Batas (law)	₱30,000	112 secs.	1	check	17	12	₱120,000	15/20	₱150,000	
Sanitation Workers	80 secs.	7	7	Linis (clean)	₱140,000	95 secs. (Note: Includes 31 seconds banked from the first round, 54 seconds from the last five games, and an additional 10 seconds from their claimed Golden Time Bonus.)	8	check	13	9	₱90,000	16/20	₱230,000	
Mag-Ama	76 secs.	7	7	Tatay (father)	₱140,000	125 secs. (Note: Includes 41 seconds banked from the first round, 74 seconds from the last five games, and an additional 10 seconds from their claimed Golden Time Bonus.)	7	check	13	13	₱2,000,000	20/20	₱2,140,000	
Manila Fire Survivors	78 secs.	10	10	Ligtas (safe)	₱200,000	92 secs.	7	check	10	10	₱2,000,000	20/20	₱2,200,000	
Engaged Couples	74 secs.	10	10	Kasal (wedding)	₱200,000	102 secs. (Note: Includes 3 seconds banked from the first round, 89 seconds from the last five games, and an additional 10 seconds from their claimed Golden Time Bonus.)	1	check	10	9	₱90,000	19/20	₱290,000	
Sari-Sari Store Sellers	72 secs.	10	4	Tinda (merchandise/sell)	₱40,000	74 secs.	4	X mark	16	11	₱110,000	15/20	₱150,000	
Tattoo & Body Piercing Artists	88 secs.	10	8	Tinta (ink)	₱80,000	86 secs.	10	check	12	10	₱100,000	18/20	₱180,000	
Nurses	72 secs.	8	5	Gamot (medicine)	₱50,000	90 secs.	3	check	15	14	₱140,000	19/20	₱190,000	
Government Employees	80 secs.	8	6	Serbisyo (service)	₱60,000	102 secs.	7	check	14	12	₱120,000	18/20	₱180,000	
Mangangalakal	74 secs.	10	10	Sipag (diligence)	₱200,000	96 secs. (Note: Includes 2 seconds banked from the first round, 84 seconds from the last five games, and an additional 10 seconds from their claimed Golden Time Bonus.)	5	check	10	10	₱2,000,000	20/20	₱2,200,000	
Dancers	68 secs.	10	6	Sayaw (dance)	₱60,000	82 secs.	7	check	14	7	₱70,000	13/20	₱130,000	
2023 College Graduates	46 secs.	5	5	Aral (study/lesson)	₱100,000	98 secs. (Note: Includes 12 seconds banked from the first round, 76 seconds from the last five games, and an additional 10 seconds from their claimed Golden Time Bonus.)	5	check	15	11	₱110,000	16/20	₱210,000	
Pawnshop & Money Remittance Tellers	92 secs.	10	9	Sangla (mortgage/guarantee)	₱90,000	64 secs.	3	X mark	11	6	₱60,000	15/20	₱150,000	
Band Members	72 secs.	10	9	Tugtog (tunes/music)	₱90,000	102 secs.	5	check	11	8	₱80,000	17/20	₱170,000	
Taguig Tenement Community	82 secs.	10	5	Bahay (house)	₱50,000	82 secs.	7	X mark	15	9	₱90,000	14/20	₱140,000	
Pharmacists & Botika Employees	74 secs.	10	8	Gamot (medicine)	₱80,000	80 secs. (Note: The song "Best Time" by BGYO was assigned as their song with the Golden Time Bonus attached. However, the song mentioned was the last song to be guessed by the group; hence, it was not added to their time. It is still added here for transparency purposes.)	4	check	12	12	₱2,000,000	20/20	₱2,080,000	
Solo Parents	90 secs.	10	10	Parent	₱200,000	108 secs. (Note: Includes 14 seconds banked from the first round, 94 seconds from the last five games, and an additional 10 seconds from their claimed Golden Time Bonus.)	7	check	10	7	₱70,000	17/20	₱270,000	
Magbabalut	80 secs.	10	8	Balut	₱80,000	78 secs.	3	X mark	12	10	₱100,000	18/20	₱180,000	
Divisoria Stall Sellers	62 secs.	10	4	Benta (sale/selling)	₱40,000	118 secs.	4	check	16	16	₱2,000,000	20/20	₱2,040,000	

== Celebrity guests ==
On a weekly basis, Vice would invite celebrity guests to serve as pinch-hitters for the resident band's vocalists and to assist him in providing clues for the answers during certain rounds. On Saturdays, Vice typically invites two celebrity comedians (Beki Velo appeared in every Saturday episode since episode 5) and a different celebrity vocalist on Sundays. Furthermore, some vocalists may perform original or cover songs, as well as songs performed by others.

The common games in which both guest comedians and singers participated were Lights, Camera, Act-Sing!, Lip-Sing, and The ChooSing One since the first episode, and Sing-Tunog beginning with the fourth episode, until it became a regular feature on the eighth episode. Ayu-Sing Mo and Tagali-Sing appeared only once on two separate episodes, the first and sixth, respectively.

=== Comedians ===
Each Saturday episode featured two comedians taking part in the games "Lights, Camera, Act-Sing" and "Lip-Sing." Four celebrity comedians have appeared during the season: Beki Velo, Didong, Divine Tetay, and Petite.

Petite made the most appearances (16), followed by Beki Velo with 14. Meanwhile, Didong had only appeared in four episodes (Sanitation Workers, Pharmacists & Botika Employees, Solo Parents, and Magbabalut), and Divine Tetay had only appeared in the first episode (Pulis).

List of games and songs participated by comedian guests on Everybody, Sing! Season 3
Episode	Comedian guests	Game	Song played	Ref.
1	Divine Tetay and Petite	Lights, Camera, Act-Sing	Chasing Pavements (Adele)	
1	Divine Tetay and Petite	Lip-Sing	Hinahanap-hanap Kita (Rivermaya)	
3	Didong and Petite	Lights, Camera, Act-Sing	Mr. Dreamboy (Sheryl Cruz)	
3	Didong and Petite	Lip-Sing	Simpleng Tao (Gloc-9)	
5	Beki Velo & Petite	Lights, Camera, Act-Sing	Patuloy ang Pangarap (Angeline Quinto)	
5	Beki Velo & Petite	Lip-Sing	Stay (Carol Banawa)	
7	Beki Velo & Petite	Lights, Camera, Act-Sing	Sirena (Gloc-9 feat. Ebe Dancel)	
7	Beki Velo & Petite	Lip-Sing	Stay (Carol Banawa)	
9	Beki Velo & Petite	Lights, Camera, Act-Sing	Baby, I Love Your Way (Big Mountain)	
9	Beki Velo & Petite	Lip-Sing	May Minamahal (Hajji Alejandro)	
11	Beki Velo & Petite	Lights, Camera, Act-Sing	Pumapatak ang Ulan (APO Hiking Society)	
11	Beki Velo & Petite	Lip-Sing	Meron Ba (Nikki Valdez)	
13	Beki Velo & Petite	Lights, Camera, Act-Sing	Mamang Sorbetero (Celeste Legaspi)	
13	Beki Velo & Petite	Lip-Sing	How Did You Know (Chiqui Pineda)	
15	Beki Velo & Petite	Lights, Camera, Act-Sing	Hold On (Neocolours)	
15	Beki Velo & Petite	Lip-Sing	Paubaya (Moira Dela Torre)	
17	Beki Velo & Petite	Lights, Camera, Act-Sing	Tadhana (Up Dharma Down)	
17	Beki Velo & Petite	Lip-Sing	We Belong (Toni Gonzaga)	
19	Beki Velo & Petite	Lights, Camera, Act-Sing	Blue Jeans (APO Hiking Society)	
19	Beki Velo & Petite	Lip-Sing	Sana Maulit Muli (Regine Velasquez)	
21	Beki Velo & Petite	Lights, Camera, Act-Sing	Para-Paraan (Nadine Lustre)	
21	Beki Velo & Petite	Lip-Sing	Penge Naman Ako N'yan (The Itchyworms)	
23	Beki Velo & Petite	Lights, Camera, Act-Sing	Saranggola ni Pepe (Celeste Legaspi)	
23	Beki Velo & Petite	Lip-Sing	Ikaw Pa Rin ang Mamahalin (April Boys)	
25	Beki Velo & Petite	Lights, Camera, Act-Sing	Lipad ng Pangarap (Dessa)	
25	Beki Velo & Petite	Lip-Sing	Kung Mawawala Ka (Ogie Alcasid & Karylle)	
27	Beki Velo & Petite	Lights, Camera, Act-Sing	Eme (Note: Stylized in lowercase) (Moira dela Torre)	
27	Beki Velo & Petite	Lip-Sing	You Won't See Me Crying (Passage)	
29	Beki Velo & Petite	Lights, Camera, Act-Sing	Anak (Freddie Aguilar)	
29	Beki Velo & Petite	Lip-Sing	Kahit Habang Buhay (Smokey Mountain)	
31	Beki Velo & Didong	Lights, Camera, Act-Sing	Ang Tipo Kong Lalake (DJ Alvaro)	
31	Beki Velo & Didong	Lip-Sing	Halukay Ube (SexBomb Girls)	
33	Beki Velo & Didong	Lights, Camera, Act-Sing	Dadalhin (Regine Velasquez)	
33	Beki Velo & Didong	Lip-Sing	Muntik Na Kitang Minahal (The Company)	
35	Beki Velo & Didong	Lights, Camera, Act-Sing	Tayong Dalawa (Rey Valera)	
35	Beki Velo & Didong	Lip-Sing	Huwag na Huwag Mong Sasabihin (Kitchie Nadal)	
37	Beki Velo & Petite	Lights, Camera, Act-Sing	Tagpuan (Moira dela Torre)	
37	Beki Velo & Petite	Lip-Sing	Magandang Dilag (JM Bales feat. KVN)	

=== Celebrity singers ===
Every Sunday episode, a different celebrity singer appears and is assigned to play two of the four games: Ayu-Sing Mo, Sing-Tunog, TagaliSing, and The ChooSing One. Celebrity singers frequently appear on the games The ChooSing One (all episodes) and Sing-Tunog (since episode 4, 8 to 38). Ayu-Sing Mo and Tagali-Sing appeared only once in two episodes (episodes 2 and 6, respectively).

List of games and songs participated by guest singers on Everybody, Sing! Season 3
Episode	Guest singer	Game	Song played	Ref.
2	KZ Tandingan (Note: Credited mononymously as KZ.)	The ChooSing One	Walang Kapalit (Rey Valera)	
2	KZ Tandingan	Ayu-Sing Mo	Mahal Ko o Mahal Ako (KZ Tandingan)	
4	Nyoy Volante	Sing-Tunog	Someday (Nina)	
4	Nyoy Volante	The ChooSing One	Sana Dalawa ang Puso Ko (Bodjie's Law of Gravity)	
6	Ogie Alcasid	TagaliSing	Mahal Kita Walang Iba (Ogie Alcasid)	
6	Ogie Alcasid	The ChooSing One	Pangarap Ko Ang Ibigin Ka (Ogie Alcasid)	
8	Sheryn Regis	Sing-Tunog	Gusto Ko Nang Bumitaw (Sheryn Regis)	
8	Sheryn Regis	The ChooSing One	Come In Out of the Rain (Wendy Moten)	
10	Marco Sison	Sing-Tunog	Si Aida, Si Lorna, o Si Fe (Marco Sison)	
10	Marco Sison	The ChooSing One	My Love Will See You Through (Marco Sison)	
12	Adie Garcia	Sing-Tunog	Tahanan (Adie)	
12	Adie Garcia	The ChooSing One	Paraluman (Adie)	
14	Dingdong Avanzado	Sing-Tunog	Paniwalaan Mo (Blue Jeans)	
14	Dingdong Avanzado	The ChooSing One	Makapiling Ka Sana (Dingdong Avanzado)	
16	Ice Seguerra	Sing-Tunog	Pagdating ng Panahon (Aiza Seguerra)	
16	Ice Seguerra	The ChooSing One	Power of Two (Indigo Girls)	
18	Bituin Escalante	Sing-Tunog	Bakit Ako Mahihiya (Didith Reyes)	-
18	Bituin Escalante	The ChooSing One	Kung Ako Na Lang Sana (Bituin Escalante)	
20	Jireh Lim	Sing-Tunog	Buko (Jireh Lim)	
20	Jireh Lim	The ChooSing One	Magkabilang Mundo (Jireh Lim)	
22	Geneva Cruz	Sing-Tunog	Kailan (Smokey Mountain)	
22	Geneva Cruz	The ChooSing One	Anak ng Pasig (Geneva Cruz)	
24	Yeng Constantino	Sing-Tunog	Chinito (Yeng Constantino)	
24	Yeng Constantino	The ChooSing One	Ikaw (Yeng Constantino)	
26	Bugoy Drilon	Sing-Tunog	Muli (Rodel Naval)	
26	Bugoy Drilon	The ChooSing One	Paano Na Kaya (Bugoy Drilon)	
28	Paolo & Miguel Benjamin of Ben&Ben	Sing-Tunog	Araw-Araw (Ben&Ben)	
28	Paolo & Miguel Benjamin of Ben&Ben	The ChooSing One	Pagtingin (Ben&Ben)	
30	Michael Pangilinan (Note: Presented as Khel Pangilinan.)	Sing-Tunog	Bakit Ba Ikaw (Michael Pangilinan)	
30	Michael Pangilinan	The ChooSing One	Hanggang Kailan (Michael Pangilinan)	
32	Moira Dela Torre (Note: Credited mononymously as Moira.)	Sing-Tunog	Malaya (Moira Dela Torre)	
32	Moira Dela Torre	The ChooSing One	Babalik Sa'yo (Moira Dela Torre)	
34	Barbie Almalbis	Sing-Tunog	Torpe (Barbie Almalbis)	
34	Barbie Almalbis	The ChooSing One	Tabing Ilog (Barbie's Cradle)	
36	Nonoy Zuñiga	Sing-Tunog	Doon Lang (Nonoy Zuñiga)	
36	Nonoy Zuñiga	The ChooSing One	Never Ever Say Goodbye (Nonoy Zuñiga)	
38	Jed Madela	Sing-Tunog	Give Me A Chance (Ric Segreto)	
38	Jed Madela	The ChooSing One	A Smile In Your Heart (Ariel Rivera)	

== Reception ==
=== Online viewership ===
Everybody, Sing! maintained a strong viewership on YouTube and became a trending topic on X (formerly Twitter) across the country during the season's premiere. It received 144,660 concurrent views on its first episode (June 3) and increased to 147,024 concurrent views on Sunday (June 4).

The show's first new peak in concurrent online viewers occurred on July 29 and 30, 2023, during the 100 Nurses episode, with 158,475 and 154,008 concurrent views, respectively. The show then reached its second new peak of concurrent online viewers during its final re-run week, which included the second re-broadcast of the 100 Engaged Couples episode, with 161,219 concurrent views on February 3 and 168,044 concurrent viewers on February 4, and broke its record of concurrent online viewers during its finale week, with 171,278 concurrent views on February 10 and 172,125 concurrent views on February 11.

=== TV ratings ===
==== Original broadcast ====
The season's pilot episode on June 3, 2023 received a 5.4% weekly average rating on free television. Meanwhile, the season had its highest rating of 8%, which was the September 23, 2023 episode featuring the first round of gameplay of the Pawnshop & Money Remittance Tellers.

Pilot Episode Rating	Final Episode Rating	Peak Rating	Average Rating	Source
5.4% June 3–4, 2023	—N/a	8.0% September 23, 2023	6.5%	

==== Re-runs ====
AGB Nielsen did not release ratings for the season's first re-run week on July 22–23, 2023. However, the season's re-run episodes had its highest rating of 7.3%, which was the October 8, 2023 episode featuring the second round of gameplay of the 100 Tattoo & Body Piercing Artists, while the last two re-run episodes had a rating of 5.5% on February 3, 2024, and 5.7% on February 4, 2024, respectively.

First Re-Run Episode Rating	Last Re-Run Episode Rating	Peak Re-Run Rating	Average Re-Run Rating	Source
—N/a	5.7% February 4, 2024	7.3% October 8, 2023	5.8%	
