= Jireh Lim =

Filipino singer-songwriter

- Born: John Jireh Lim; August 25, 1992 (age 34); Dasmariñas, Cavite, Philippines
- Origin: Dasmariñas; Manila; United States
- Genres: OPM; acoustic; pop
- Occupations: Singer; songwriter; guitarist
- Instruments: Vocals; guitar
- Years active: 2011–present
- Label: Warner Music

John Jireh Lim (born August 25, 1992), is a Filipino singer-songwriter and guitarist.

Lim gained widespread recognition in the early 2010s with his songs "Buko" (lit. 'Coconut') and "Magkabilang Mundo" (lit. 'Opposite World') which gained mainstream attention on YouTube. He gained popularity in 2013 and 2014, but his songs were only made available on music streaming platforms in 2015. At the time, he was an independent artist without a record label, which contributed to the delayed release. In 2015, he is currently signed under Warner Music Philippines and released his debut album, Love and Soul.

== Early life ==
John Jireh Lim grew up in Dasmariñas, Cavite, and Sablayan, Occidental Mindoro. He splits his time between the United States, where his mother resides and Manila, where the rest of his family lives. He studied music at the University of Santo Tomas. Lim began playing guitar at age 13, inspired by older students at his school who played and sang, which helped him develop his passion for music at an early age.

== Career ==
Lim began writing songs at the age of 16. In 2011, he released his first song, "Stars Fade", which remains a personal favorite. Lim has said that he was not comfortable expressing his feelings directly, so he turned to writing as a way to pour his emotions onto paper and translate them into music.

Lim initially shared his music online as independent, gaining attention through YouTube uploads. In 2013, his breakout single, "Buko", was inspired by the true story of his grandparents, a school principal and a janitor. The song quickly circulated on social media and video platforms, earning him recognition as an independent OPM artist. "Buko" quickly became widely recognized as the nation's Pambansang Harana (lit. 'National Serenade') that year".

In 2016, Lim appeared on the Wish 107.5 Bus, where he performed his song "Buko". He also promoted his single "Pananagutan" (lit. 'Liability') and a cover of Stephen Speaks' "Out of My League".

In 2014, Lim's song "Pisngi" (lit. 'Cheek') was recognized as one of the Top 10 OPM songs of the year by GMA Network.

In 2022, Lim released the single "Gumamela" (lit. 'Hibiscus'). Manila Bulletin described the song as a blend of pop and R&B, highlighting his evolving style while remaining rooted in acoustic music. According to Lim, the song explores the theme of going to great lengths for love, with lyrics that are both relatable and sincere. "Gumamela" was originally written in 2012, developing it from a simple melody he hummed on his guitar, inspired by moments spent with a loved one.

In 2023, Lim performed "Masungit" (lit. 'Grumpy') on the ABS-CBN program It's Showtime. He also performed his hits "Magkabilang Mundo" and "Buko". He appeared in the Year-End Grand Pyro-Musical Show at Riverbanks Center.

In 2026, Lim expressed amusement and confusion after receiving a copyright infringement notice for performing his own 2013 song "Buko" in a Facebook reel, where he sang the song with a band; he later posted a screenshot of the notice stating that the reel's earnings were being claimed by music rights holders and that several rights owners had requested changes to the video after detecting a significant portion of their music in the clip.

== Discography ==
=== Studio albums ===
Title	Album details	Ref.
Love and Soul	Released: 2015; Label: Warner Music Philippines; Formats: Digital download, streaming	
Patak na Luha	Released: 2017; Label: Warner Music Philippines; Formats: Digital download, streaming	

=== Live albums ===
Title	Album details	Ref.
Jireh Lim	Released: 2016; Label: Warner Music Philippines; Formats: Digital download, streaming	

=== Singles ===
List of singles, with year released and album/EPs name shown
Title	Year	Album/EPs	Ref.
"Buko"	2013	Love and Soul	
"Magkabilang Mundo"	2013	Love and Soul	
"Pagsuko"	2013	Love and Soul	
"Pisngi"	2014	Love and Soul	
"Gumamela"	2022	—	
"Masungit"	2023	—	
"Aminin Mo Na"	2023	—	
"Ayokong Masanay" (feat. jikamarie)	2023	—	
"Iingatan Kita" (feat. Nik Makino)	2023	—	
