= Klarisse de Guzman =

Filipino singer (born 1991)

Klarisse De Guzman
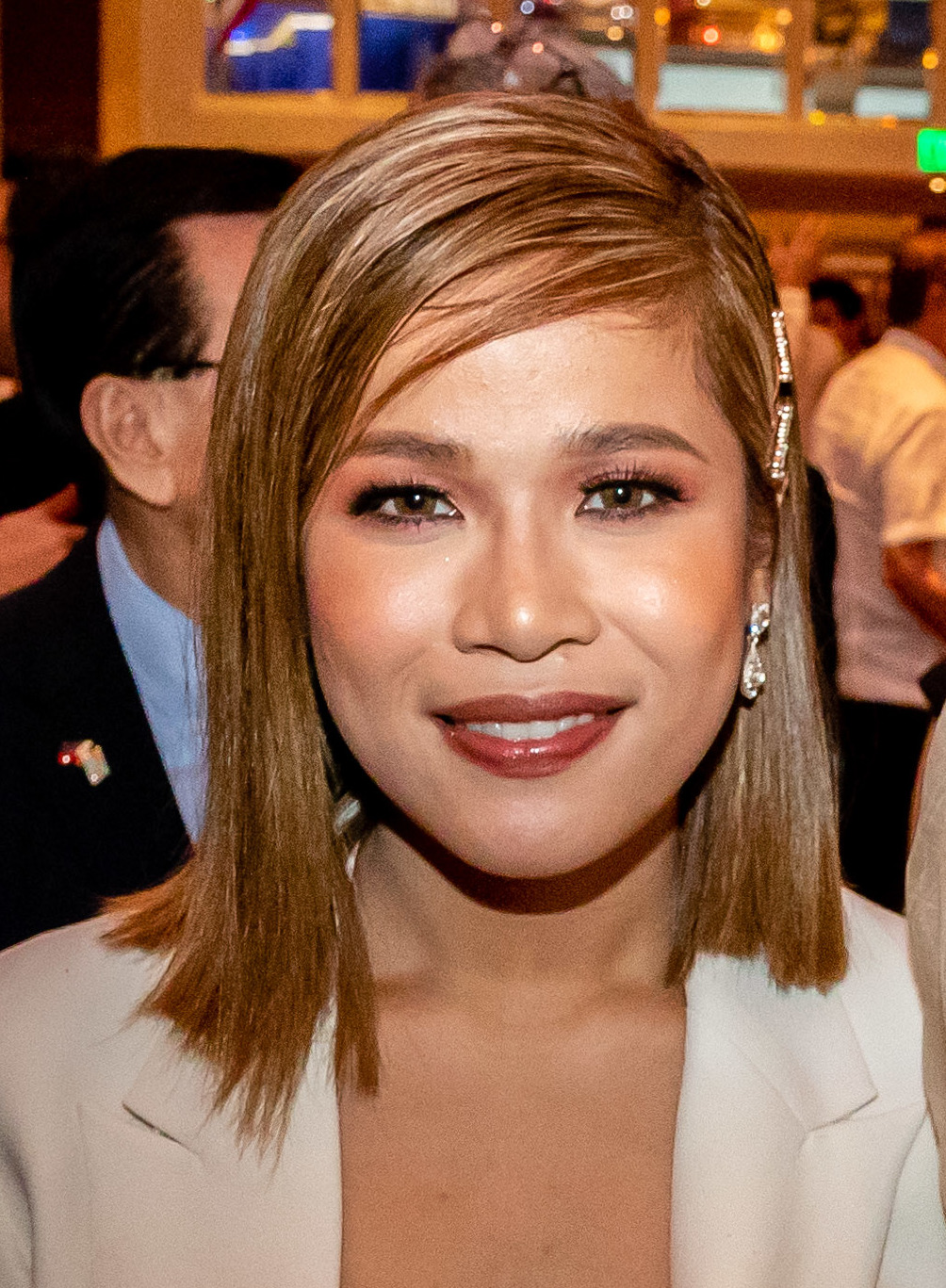
- De Guzman in 2018

Background information
- Born: September 6, 1991 (age 35); Makati, Philippines
- Genres: Pop, Soul, R&B,
- Occupations: Singer; actress
- Instrument: Vocals
- Years active: 2010–present
- Labels: MCA Music Philippines (2014–2016); Star Music (2017–present)
- Formerly of: Birit Queens; O Diva

Klarisse "Klang" de Guzman (born September 6, 1991) is a Filipino singer and actress who rose to prominence after placing as the first-runner up of the first season of The Voice of the Philippines in 2013 and being crowned the winner of the third season of Your Face Sounds Familiar in 2021.

Regarded as the "Philippines Soul Diva", De Guzman is recognized as one of the most prominent Filipino artists of her generation. In 2017, she won "Most Influential Female Concert Performers of the Year" with Angeline Quinto, Jona Viray and Morissette at The 7th EdukCircle Awards. The following year, she won the "Most Promising Female Concert Artist of the Year" trophy at the Box Office Entertainment Awards.

She is an artist under ABS-CBN's training and management subsidiary Star Magic and was also a member of the Filipino singing quartet, Birit Queens. In 2016, she competed in the celebrity competition We Love OPM as part of the singing trio O Diva which landed as the competition's third placer.

== Early life ==
De Guzman was born on September 6, 1991, in Makati, Philippines. She has been labeled as a "kontesera" (literally contest-woman) as she has competed in various singing competitions since her childhood years. In 2001 when she was nine, she landed second place in Batang Kampeon where Almira Cercado of 4th Impact and Jake Zyrus (formerly Charice Pempengco) were also contestants. De Guzman also competed in Star for a Night along with Angeline Quinto and Sarah Geronimo, the latter becoming her coach in the first season of The Voice of the Philippines. While an AB Music Production student at the De La Salle–College of Saint Benilde, she was member of a band called Turning Point. She was also a student when she auditioned for The Voice.

== Career ==
=== 2013: The Voice ===
De Guzman auditioned on the first season of The Voice of the Philippines in 2013 with the song "Tulak Ng Bibig" by Julianne Tarroja. All of the show's coaches, Bamboo Mañalac, Sarah Geronimo, Lea Salonga, and apl.de.ap (in order) turned their respective chair to express interest in mentoring her. De Guzman shared after performing her audition song that she once joined Star for a Night which made Geronimo surprised as she did not recognize her at first. The four-chair turner eventually chose Geronimo to be her coach in the competition. She proceeded in the Battles Round and performed Somebody That I Used to Know with Gabriel Ramos and Rouxette Swinton. After winning the round, she proceeded with the live shows. She performed Beggin', I Can't Make You Love Me, The Voice Within with Morissette, and the Michael Bolton version of To Love Somebody. After accumulating higher scores from public votes and the team coach, she beat Amon during the Top 8 competition making her part of the top four artists who will compete during the grand finals. At the first round of the grand finals, she competed against the remaining contestants, Janice Javier, Myk Perez, and Mitoy Yonting. She performed The Climb and together with her coach and Robert Seña, Your Song. Javier and Perez were eliminated at the first round leaving Yonting and de Guzman fight in the second round for the champion title. De Guzman sang "Magsimula Ka" by Leo Valdez and ended up as runner-up with 42.35% score against Yonting's 57.65%.

==== Performances ====
– Studio version of performance reached the top 10 on iTunes

Stage	Song	Original artist	Date	Order	Result
Blind Audition	"Tulak ng Bibig, Kabig ng Dibdib"	Julianne Tarroja	July 20, 2013	11.6	All four chairs turned (Joined Team Sarah Geronimo)
Battle Rounds	"Somebody That I Used to Know" (vs. Gabriel Ramos vs. Rouxette Swinton)	Gotye feat. Kimbra	August 17, 2013	19.3	Saved by Sarah
Live Top 24	"Beggin'"	The Four Seasons	September 1, 2013	24.5	Saved by Sarah
Live Top 16	"I Can't Make You Love Me"	Bonnie Raitt	September 15, 2013	28.4	Saved by Sarah and Public Vote (123.91 points)
Live Top 8	"The Voice Within" (vs. Morissette)	Christina Aguilera	September 21, 2013	29.4	Safe
Live (Semi-finals)	"To Love Somebody"	Bee Gees	September 22, 2013	30.6	Safe
Live (Finals)	"The Climb"	Miley Cyrus	September 28, 2013	31.4	Runner-up
Live (Finals)	"Slowly"	The Chainsmokers	September 28, 2013	31.5	Runner-up
Live (Finals)	"Your Song" (with Sarah Geronimo and Robert Seña)	Elton John	September 29, 2013	32.1	Runner-up
Live (Finals)	"Magsimula Ka"	Leo Valdez	September 29, 2013	32.5	Runner-up

=== 2014–2015: MCA Music and first concert ===
De Guzman started appearing on TV shows aired by ABS-CBN, particularly ASAP. In January 2014, Klarisse was officially announced in the said program as the latest addition to the Star Magic artists. She also became part of the singing trio, ASAP Homegrown Divas together with Morissette and Angeline Quinto.

After competing in The Voice, she signed a record and management deal with MCA Music along with Janice Javier, Myk Perez, and Paolo Onesa who were her co-finalists from The Voice. Her first album entitled "Klarisse de Guzman" featured songs from her contest pieces from the competition. These were The Climb, To Love Somebody, and I Can't Make You Love Me. It also featured Sabihin Mo Sa Akin which became the theme song of Mirabella as well as a self-composed song, "Di Kayang Pilitin".

Also in 2014, she had a solo concert entitled The Voice of Klarisse De Guzman: Live on Concert. It was held at Teatrino, Promenade Mall on August 29, 2014, with Nyoy Volante, Juan Karlos Labajo, and Paolo Onesa as guests.

=== 2016–2020: Himig Handog, Birit Queens, We Love OPM, and Star Music ===
De Guzman also became an interpreter at the 2016 Himig Handog, a songwriting and music video competition. She interpreted "Sana'y Tumibok Muli" composed by Jose Joel Mendoza. The music video was produced by Asia Pacific College. The song took the 5th Best Song award during the grand finals held at the Kia Theatre on April 24, 2016, and became part of the album, Himig Handog P-Pop Love Songs (2016).

In May 2016, she joined Liezel Garcia and Emmanuelle Vera to form the group O Diva as part of ABS-CBN's music competition, We Love OPM, under the mentorship of KZ Tandingan. The competition was joined by five other groups of musical artists to weekly perform a song of the week's featured Filipino artist. The trio performed Ikaw Ang Pangarap, Katawan, Gaya ng Dati, Kung Kailangan Mo Ako (together with Power Chords group), Basang-basa Sa Ulan, Karakaraka, and Batang-Bata Ka Pa. The group consistently ranked at the upper percentile each week and was exempted to compete during the semi-finals after gathering the most number of points across episodes. During the grand finals held at the Newport Performing Arts Theater in Resorts World Manila on July 17, 2016, O Diva performed "Limang Dipang Tao" and landed third place with 57.78% final score.

Episode	Featured Artist of the Week and Song	Points and Group's Rank
Finals	Ryan Cayabyab - Limang Dipang Tao	Third place
Week 9	APO Hiking Society - Batang-Bata Ka Pa	90 (2nd)
Week 8	Vice Ganda - Karakaraka	88 (2nd)
Week 7	Aegis - Basang-basa Sa Ulan	94 (2nd)
Week 6	Rico J. Puno - Diyos Ang Pag-ibig	94 (2nd)
Week 5	Rey Valera - Kung Kailangan Mo Ako	96 (1st/2nd)
Week 4	Gary Valenciano - Gaya ng Dati	97 (1st)
Week 3	Hagibis - Katawan	90 (3rd/4th)
Week 2	Sharon Cuneta - Mr. DJ	94 (1st)
Week 1	Martin Nievera - Ikaw Ang Pangarap	90 (3rd)

In May 2016, a vocal showdown was conducted in ASAP where De Guzman performed with Angeline Quinto, Morissette, and Jona who has just transferred to ABS-CBN from GMA Network. Later on, the Birit Queens (literally Belting Queens) was formed which was composed of the four singers. The quartet regularly performed in ASAP and became guests on different TV shows from the network.

In October 2016, De Guzman along with other The Voice alumni Juan Karlos Labajo and Jason Dy staged a concert named One Voice at the Music Museum. Liezl Garcia and Emmanuelle Vera also performed in the concert along with De Guzman during one segment to regroup as O Diva.

The group Birit Queens held its concert at the MOA Arena in March 2017. The concert continued outside the Philippines where they also performed at the National Theater of Abu Dhabi on April. The quartet then brought the concert in the United States of America. The Birit Queens had their final performance as a group on a pre-taped episode on October 29, 2017.

In 2017, she had her second album under Star Music and was titled "Klarisse". It featured "Wala na Talaga" as carrier single. The song was used as the theme song of the Philippine airing of the To the Dearest Intruder (titled My Dearest Intruder in the Philippines). "Ikaw at Ako", a duet with Morissette and was the theme song of Doble Kara, was also included in the album.

In 2018, she and Michael Pangilinan covered "Araw-Araw, Gabi-Gabi" to serve as the theme song of the drama television series Araw Gabi. The same year, she also released a single called "NBSB" which stands for No Boyfriend Since Birth under Star Pop PH.

=== 2021–present: Your Face Sounds Familiar Season 3, It's Showtime and PBB: Celebrity Collab Edition ===
In February 2021, De Guzman was revealed to be one of the eight contestants of the third season of the TV show, Your Face Sounds Familiar. She was a four-time weekly winner in the competition. During the third week, she won as the celebrity winner by impersonating Jaya with the song "Hanggang Dito na Lang". She was again declared as the weekly winner during the fifth week by impersonating Minnie Riperton with the song "Lovin' You" as well as during the ninth week by impersonating Sharon Cuneta with the song "Sana'y Wala Nang Wakas". She bagged her fourth weekly winner title during the eleventh week by impersonating Aretha Franklin with the song "Respect". At the end of the competition, she was declared as the season's Grand Winner with a score of 90%.

Episode	Impersonated Artist and Song	Points and Ranking
Grand Finals	Patti LaBelle - Over the Rainbow	90% (Grand Winner)
Week 12	Toni Basil - Mickey	5 (7th)
Week 11	Aretha Franklin - Respect	24 (1st)
Week 10	Ann Wilson of Heart - These Dreams	19 (2nd/3rd)
Week 9	Sharon Cuneta - Sana'y Wala ng Wakas	26 (1st)
Week 8	Lani Misalucha - Bukas na Lang Kita Mamahalin	20 (2nd)
Week 7	Tom Jones - It's Not Unusual	15 (3rd)
Week 6	Mariah Carey - Through the Rain	21 (3rd)
Week 5	Minnie Riperton - Lovin' You	30 (1st)
Week 4	Britney Spears - Oops!... I Did It Again	17 (4th)
Week 3	Jaya - Hanggang Dito na Lang	39 (1st)
Week 2	Shakira - Whenever, Wherever	18 (4th/5th)
Week 1	Christina Aguilera - Dirrty	19 (4th)

In May 2021, she released a new single titled Ulan ng Kahapon under StarPop. In June 2021, ASOP Music Festival's 2021 commemorative album was released. De Guzman became part of the album where she recorded her rendition of God is with Us from the 7th ASOP Music Festival.

Also in June 2021, she became one of the judges of Tawag ng Tanghalan, a singing competition segment of the noontime show It's Showtime. She was also one of the hosts of the twelfth anniversary episode of the show in November 2021.

In early 2022, she became one of the regular SING-vestigators of the fourth season of I Can See Your Voice. However, her stint was short-lived as from the 7th episode, she was replaced by original SING-vestigator Angeline Quinto.

In 2025, she became one of the Kapamilya celebrity housemates of the third celebrity season of Pinoy Big Brother. Following her stint on the show, she became widely known by her nickname "Klang." In October, she and her real-life partner Trina Rey appeared as one of the celebrity cameos in the music video First Luv by pop group Bini.

Later in the same year, de Guzman returned for the fourth season of the TV show, Your Face Sounds Familiar, this time as the mentor for vocals, along with former contestant Nyoy Volante, who reprises his role as mentors for choreography. Both also serves as guest jurors in some episodes in the absence of some of the main jury.

== Personal life ==
De Guzman is openly bisexual. She has been dating a woman named Christrina Rey since 2021. De Guzman's father knew of her sexuality before he died.

== Discography ==
=== Studio albums ===
List of studio albums, with selected details
Title	Album details
Klarisse de Guzman	Released: 2014; Label: MCA Music; Formats: CD, digital download, streaming
Klarisse	Released: July 28, 2017; Label: Star Music; Formats: Digital download, streaming

=== Singles ===
==== As lead artist ====
List of singles as lead artist, showing year released, and associated albums
Title	Year	Album
"Mahal Mo Pa Ba Ako"	2016	Klarisse
"Wala Na Talaga"	2017	Klarisse
"NBSB"	2019	Non-album singles
"Ulan Ng Kahapon"	2021	Non-album singles
"God is with Us" (with Boggie Manipon)	2021	A Song of Praise Music Festival International: The Legacy Continues
"Thank You"	2022	Non-album single
"Ayoko Na Sana" (with Rox Santos)	2023	RoX5antos

=== Other appearances ===
Title	Year	Album
"I Can't Make You Love Me"	2013	The Voice of the Philippines: The Final 16
"Slowly"	2013	The Voice of the Philippines: The Final 4
"The Climb"	2013	The Voice of the Philippines: The Final 4
"Just My Imagination (Running Away With Me)" (with Paolo Onesa)	2014	Pop Goes Standards
"Hope For Humanity" (with various artists)	2014	Non-album single
"Memory"	2015	101 Broadway Musicals
"Ikaw Ay Ako" (with Morissette)	2015	Dreamscape Televisions of Love, Vol. 01
"Silent Night"	2015	My Christmas Album All Stars
"Sana'y Tumibok Muli"	2016	Himig Handog P-Pop Love Songs

=== Soundtracks ===
Title	Year	Film/Show
"Dito Ka Lang, Wag Kang Lalayo"	2025	The Alibi

== Filmography ==
Klarisse mostly appears on ASAP. She also guested on few occasions on iWant ASAP. She also had multiple visits on Umagang Kay Ganda, Kris TV, and Magandang Buhay where she was invited to be interviewed and to perform. She has also performed on It's Showtime on different occasions apart from being invited as celebrity contestant on different contests of the TV show. After her stint as one of the housemates of Pinoy Big Brother Celebrity Collab Edition, she was able to receive roles for movies, especially for the Metro Manila Film Festival 2025, and a television series that will air in 2026.

=== Television ===
Year	Title	Role
2002	Star for a Night	Herself / Semi-finalist
2013	The Voice of the Philippines (season 1)	Herself / Contestant / Runner-up
2013–present	ASAP	Herself / Performer
2014	The Singing Bee	Herself / Contestant
2015	Kapamilya, Deal or No Deal	Herself / Contestant
2016	Family Feud	Herself / Contestant
2016	We Love OPM	Herself / Contestant
2016	Letters and Music	Herself / Guest
2017	Minute to Win It	Herself / Contestant
2017	It's Showtime	Herself / Guest
2018	I Can See Your Voice	Herself / Contestant
2021	Happy Time	Herself / Guest
2021–present	Your Face Sounds Familiar	Herself / Contestant (2021); Mentor / Guest Jury (since 2025)
2025	Pinoy Big Brother: Celebrity Collab Edition	Herself / Housemate
2025	Rainbow Rumble	Herself / Contestant
2026	Pinoy Big Brother: Celebrity Collab Edition 2.0	Herself / Houseguest
2026	The Secrets of Hotel 88	Monette Salcedo
2026	Everybody, Sing! season 4	Herself / Performer

=== Film ===
Year	Film	Role
2025	Call Me Mother	Mayet de Guzman
2025	Bar Boys: After School	Mae Perez

=== Music video appearances ===
Title	Year	Director(s)	Ref.
"First Luv" (with Bini and Esnyr)	2025	Jason Max	

== Concerts ==
=== Live concerts and performances ===
Solo concerts
Year	Title	Details	Notes	Ref.
2014	The Voice of Klarisse De Guzman: Live In Concert	Date: August 29, Friday; Venue: Teatrino Promenade	Special Guest: Juan Karlos, Nyoy Volante & Paolo Onesa	
2022	Klarisse: Her Time	Date: November 18, Friday; Venue: New Frontier Theater	First major solo concert; sold-out concert	
2025	The Big Night	Date: September 26, 2025, Friday; Venue: Araneta Coliseum	Second major solo concert; sold-out concert	

Co-headlining concerts
Year	Title	Details	Notes	Ref.
2017	ASAP Birit Queens	Date: March 31, Friday; Venue: MOA Arena; International runs: United States & Middle East	with Angeline Quinto, Jona and Morissette	
2023	The Champions	Date: May 21, Sunday; Venue: US Concert Tour	with Marcelito Pomoy and Mitoy Yonting; sold-out concert	

== Awards and nominations ==
Year	Award	Category	Work/Recipient	Result	Ref.
2014	4th Yahoo! OMG Awards	Female Performer of the Year	—N/a	Nominated	
2015	28th Awit Awards	Best Collaboration	"Sino Ka Ba?"(with Nyoy Volante)	Nominated	
2015	28th Awit Awards	Best Song Written for Movie/ TV/ Stage Play	"Sabihin Mo Sa Akin"	Nominated	
2016	1st Wish Music Awards	Wish Ballad Song of the Year	"Magpakailanman"	Nominated	
2016	1st Wish Music Awards	Wish Original Song of the Year	"Magpakailanman"	Nominated	
2016	1st Wish Music Awards	Wish Female Artist of the Year	—N/a	Nominated	
2017	7th EdukCircle Awards	Most Influential Female Concert Performers of the Year (Note: Shared with Jona, Angeline Quinto, and Morissette)	ASAP Birit Queens	Won	
2018	49th Box Office Entertainment Awards	Most Promising Female Concert Artist of the Year	ASAP Birit Queens	Won	
2018	10th PMPC Star Awards for Music	Album of the Year	Klarisse	Nominated	
2018	10th PMPC Star Awards for Music	Pop Album of the Year	Klarisse	Nominated	
2018	10th PMPC Star Awards for Music	Female Pop Artist of the Year	"Wala Na Talaga"	Nominated	
2021	12th PMPC Star Awards for Music	Female Pop Artist of the Year	"NBSB"	Nominated	
2023	9th Wish Music Awards	Wishclusive Ballad Performance of the Year	"Wala Na Talaga"	Nominated	
2026	PMPC Star Awards for Movies	New Movie Actress of the Year	Herself	Pending	

== Notes ==
Preceded by TNT Boys	Your Face Sounds Familiar (Philippine TV series); Winner; 2021	Succeeded by JMielle
Preceded by Denise Laurel	Your Face Sounds Familiar (Philippine TV series) Regular Season; Winner; February 2021–May 2021	Succeeded by JMielle
