= Everybody, Sing! season 2 =

Everybody, Sing!
- Season 2
- Hosted by: Vice Ganda
- No. of contestants: 50
- No. of winners: 5
- No. of episodes: 26

Release
- Original network: Kapamilya Channel (Note: The show also airs on Kapamilya Online Live on YouTube and through a blocktime agreement on A2Z and TV5.)
- Original release: September 24, 2022 – February 19, 2023

Season chronology
- ← Previous; Season 1 Next → Season 3

The second season of musical game show Everybody, Sing! premiered on Kapamilya Channel, Kapamilya Online Live, A2Z and TV5 from September 24, 2022, to February 19, 2023, replacing the second season of Idol Philippines and was replaced by the fifth season of The Voice Kids.

== Overview ==
The second season was confirmed by Vice Ganda on his noontime show It's Showtime.

=== Promotion ===
On September 18, 2022, Vice Ganda appeared on the second season finale of Idol Philippines to promote the musical game show's new season. His appearance featured a performance of the song "Pearly Shells", where he would later give away one-thousand pesos to audience members who would sing the correct lyrics of the song when approached.

=== Timeslot ===
The show airs every Saturdays and Sundays at 7:00 PM on Kapamilya Channel, Kapamilya Online Live, and A2Z and a delayed telecast at 9:30 PM every Saturdays and 9:00 PM every Sundays on TV5 replacing the timeslot left behind by the second season of Idol Philippines.

=== Changes ===
The second season saw a major re-improvement from the inaugural season. These were the following:

Production

- Number of participants — The maximum number of participants that can play was increased from twenty-five (25) to fifty (50), a first since the show's premiere in 2021,
- Doubled jackpot prize — The possible jackpot prize that a Songbayanan can take home was doubled, from five hundred thousand pesos (₱500,000), to one million pesos (₱1,000,000), with each player still receiving twenty-thousand pesos (₱20,000),
- Interaction allowance — Unlike the previous season, Vice was not permitted to interact with the players, with transparent wall barriers in place for each player to practice social distancing. Now that the show required its players to be fully vaccinated, Vice was then able to engage with them, but with transparent wall barriers still in place to maintain social distancing with other players, and
- New graphics — This season featured a new title card and improved graphics.

The changes were made possible due to the lowering of COVID-19 restrictions in the country.

Gameplay

- The Singko Segundo Challenge – A new mini-round played before the jackpot round, in which the Songbayanan has a chance to add an additional five (5) seconds to their jackpot timer.
- Two new game modes — This season saw the debut of two new games, namely; A-B-Sing! and AYU-Sing Mo!, during the 50 Funeral and Cemetery Workers episode on October 29, 2022.

== Episodes overview ==
Legend

- – The Songbayanan received the highest possible amount as their winning prize in the jackpot round (₱1,000,000)
- – The Songbayanan did not receive the highest possible amount as their winning prize in the jackpot round
- – The Songbayanan did not receive any amount as their winning prize in the jackpot round
- – No data

List of aired, cancelled and upcoming episodes of Everybody, Sing! Season 2
Episode		Songbayanan (Community Group)	Prize won	AGB Nielsen Ratings (NUTAM People)	Ref.
No.	Airing date	Songbayanan (Community Group)	Prize won	AGB Nielsen Ratings (NUTAM People)	Ref.
2022 Episodes
1	September 24, 2022	50 Beauticians	₱1,000,000	4.1%	
2	September 25, 2022	50 Mall Sale Clerks	₱70,000	4.4%	
3	October 1, 2022	50 Kusinero't Kusinera (Chefs)	₱50,000		
4	October 2, 2022	50 Quiapo Vendors	₱40,000 (Note: Excluding additional cash prize given by Vice Ganda.)		
5	October 8, 2022	50 Construction Workers	₱80,000	4.8%	
6	October 9, 2022	50 Sales Agents	₱60,000	4.1%	
7	October 15, 2022	50 Mananahi (Dressmakers)	₱90,000	4.1%	
8	October 16, 2022	50 Bank Employees	₱1,000,000	3.7%	
9	October 29, 2022	50 Funeral and Cemetery Workers	₱50,000	4.2%	
10	October 30, 2022	50 Repair and Service Technicians	₱90,000	4.2%	
11	November 5, 2022	50 Gas Station Employees	₱1,000,000	4.5%	
12	November 12, 2022	50 Karding Survivors & Heroes	₱60,000	4.5%	
13	November 13, 2022	50 Mangingisda (Fishermen)	₱40,000	4.5%	
14	November 19, 2022	50 Kambal at Triplets (Twins and Triplets)	₱40,000	4.3%	
15	November 20, 2022	50 Drag Queens	₱60,000	4.2%	
16	December 4, 2022	50 MMK Letter Senders	₱70,000	3.9%	
17	December 10, 2022	50 Models	₱30,000	3.5%	
18	December 17, 2022	50 Christmas Workers	₱50,000	4.1%	
2023 Episodes
19	January 1, 2023	50 Bartenders	₱1,000,000		
20	January 7, 2023	50 Magsasaka (Farmers)	₱20,000	3.6%	
21	January 15, 2023	50 Traffic Enforcers	₱80,000	4.2%	
22	January 21, 2023	50 Overseas Filipino Workers	₱40,000	4.6%	
23	January 28, 2023	50 Tricycle Drivers	₱70,000	5.0%	
24	February 4, 2023	50 Pahinante (Laborers)	₱70,000	4.5%	
25	February 11, 2023	50 Dentists	₱70,000		
26	February 19, 2023	50 Magkasintahan at Mag-Ex (Lovers and Exes)	₱1,000,000	4.8%	

=== Re-runs ===
Some episodes may be rebroadcast after their initial airing date. As of February 19, 2023, this has occurred eighteen times during the season.

List of re-run episodes of Everybody, Sing! Season 2
Episode		Songbayanan	AGB Nielsen Ratings (NUTAM People)
No.	Re-broadcast date	Songbayanan	AGB Nielsen Ratings (NUTAM People)
2022 Re-Runs
1	October 22, 2022	50 Quiapo Vendors	3.7%
2	October 23, 2022	50 Beauticians	3.3%
3	November 6, 2022	50 Mall Sales Clerks	4.0%
4	November 26, 2022	50 Kusinero at Kusinera	
5	November 27, 2022	50 Sales Agents	
6	December 3, 2022	50 Repair and Service Technicians	3.5%
7	December 11, 2022	50 Mangingisda	3.3%
8	December 18, 2022	50 Mananahi	4.0%
9	December 24, 2022	50 Kambal at Triplets	
10	December 25, 2022	50 Gasoline Station Employees	
11	December 31, 2022	50 Karding Survivors and Heroes	
2023 Re-Runs
12	January 8, 2023	50 Construction Workers	3.3%
13	January 14, 2023	50 Bank Employees	4.9%
14	January 22, 2023	50 Drag Queens	4.1%
15	January 29, 2023	50 Funeral and Cemetery Workers	4.0%
16	February 5, 2023	50 Models	4.3%
17	February 12, 2023	50 Bartenders	
18	February 18, 2023	50 Magsasaka	4.5%

== Guest vocalists ==
Vice would invite a series of guest singers in lieu of the resident band's lead vocalists.

List of Everybody, Sing! Season 2 guest singers
Episode	Celebrity guest	Game	Song played	Ref.	Notes
6	Erik Santos	The ChooSing One	Kulang Ako Kung Wala Ka (Erik Santos)		
6	Erik Santos	ReverSing	Maging Sino Ka Man (Erik Santos)		
13	Klarisse de Guzman	The ChooSing One	Wala Na Talaga (Klarisse De Guzman)		(Note: In promotion for Klarisse's upcoming first major concert, Klarisse: Her Time.)
13	Klarisse de Guzman	Ayu-Sing Mo	Paalam Na (Rachel Alejandro)		(Note: In promotion for Klarisse's upcoming first major concert, Klarisse: Her Time.)
25	Darren Espanto	The ChooSing One	Dying Inside (To Hold You) (Timmy Thomas)		(Note: In promotion for the finale of Dream Maker: Search for the Next Global Pop Group.)
25	Darren Espanto	Ayu-Sing Mo	In Love Ako Sayo (Darren Espanto)		(Note: In promotion for the finale of Dream Maker: Search for the Next Global Pop Group.)

== Gameplay ==
While games such as Sing in the Blank, PicSing a Broken Song, and The ChooSing One also appeared in this season, this season saw the debut of three new games; namely, A-B-Sing, Ayu-Sing Mo!, and the Singko Segundo Challenge. Both A-B-Sing and Ayu-SING Mo! were first introduced on the 50 Funeral and Cemetery Workers episode last October 29, 2022.

=== A-B-Sing! ===
A-B-Sing requires the SONG-pu to guess the missing lyric based on its first letter and its number of syllables as their clue. The clue is based on the number of syllables of the missing lyric. For example, if the missing lyric is "comment", then the resident band will sing "C-C" as their clue. Each correct answer given by the SONG-pu adds an additional two seconds to their jackpot timer and gives them one thousand pesos (₱1,000).

=== AYU-Sing Mo! ===
Ayu-Sing Mo requires the SONG-pu to arrange four jumbled lyrics in the correct order. Take note that the contestant should sing the exact order of lines with no added words or sentences in order for their answer to be correct. Each correct answer given by the SONG-pu adds an additional four seconds to their jackpot timer and gives them one thousand pesos (₱1,000).

=== The Singko Segundo Challenge ===
This season introduced a new mini-game entitled the Singko Segundo Challenge (lit. 'The Five-Second Challenge'), that will be played before the jackpot round. In this mini-challenge, a Songbayanan has a chance to add an additional five seconds to their jackpot timer.

Once all of the groups have played, the Songbayanan will choose a representative (dubbed as Repre-SING-tative) for this round. Once chosen, the said representative will then guess the song sang by Vice Ganda himself, by only using a related word based on the Songbayanan. For example, if the Songbayanan are beauticians, then the word that Vice will sing is kilay (lit. 'eyebrows'). The Repre-SING-tative is allowed to answer Vice's question in five seconds once Vice finishes singing.

The Repre-SING-tative must correctly answer the said question in order for their group to add an additional five seconds to their jackpot timer. If not, then the Songbayanan's jackpot timer will stay the same as before.

List of the results of the Singko Segundo Challenge
Challenge No.	Songbayanan	Repre-SING-tative (Representative)	Assigned word/phrase	Correct answer	Final result	Ref.
1	50 Beauticians	Lhyn	Kilay (eyebrows)	Chuva Choo Choo (Jolina Magdangal)	Failed	
2	50 Mall Sale Clerks	Rose	Benta (sale)	Paalam Na (Rachel Alejandro)	Passed	
3	50 Kusinero't Kusinera	Che	Pechay (cabbage)	With a Smile (Eraserheads)	Failed	
4	50 Quiapo Vendors	Tsugua	Suki (customer)	Spageti Song (Note: The song is also entitled "The Spageti Song" in streaming platforms such as Spotify, Apple Music, and YouTube.) (SexBomb Girls)	Failed	
5	50 Construction Workers	Jay-ar	Pako (nail)	Sana Dalawa Ang Puso Ko (Bodjie's Law of Gravity)	Failed	
6	50 Sales Agents	Jessica	Quota	Gusto Ko Lamang Sa Buhay (Itchyworms)	Failed	
7	50 Mananahi	Aleck	Tusok (prick)	Kailan (Smokey Mountain)	Passed	
8	50 Bank Employees	Baste	Datung (money)	Kisapmata (Rivermaya)	Passed	
9	50 Funeral and Cemetery Workers	Jhay-Jhay	Libing (bury)	Si Aida, Si Lorna, O Si Fe (Marco Sison)	Failed	
10	50 Repair and Service Technicians	Jojo	Ayusin (arrange)	Himala (Rivermaya)	Failed	
11	50 Gas Station Employees	Aming	Gas	Magasin (Eraserheads)	Failed	
12	50 Karding Survivors and Heroes	Lupa	Tibay (strength)	Annie Batungbakal (Hotdog)	Passed	
13	50 Mangingisda	Kimpuchu	Isda (fish)	Ligaya (Eraserheads)	Passed	
14	50 Kambal at Triplets	Jeng	Mukha (face)	Penge Naman Ako N'yan (Itchyworms)	Failed	
15	50 Drag Queens	Lady Chelsea	Ganda (beauty)	Beh, Buti Nga (Hotdog)	Passed	
16	50 MMK Letter Senders	Boom	Sulat (write)	Bonggahan (Sampaguita)	Passed	
17	50 Models	Mindy	Rampa (stroll)	May Bukas Pa (Rico J. Puno)	Passed	
18	50 Christmas Workers	Mhaxie	Kislap (sparkle)	Tala (Sarah Geronimo)	Passed	
19	50 Bartenders	Nams	Inom (drink)	Pamela (Note: Official name; also known as "Pamela Wan".) (Vhong Navarro)	Passed	
20	50 Magsasaka	Teteng	Tanim (plant)	Kahit Maputi Na Ang Buhok Ko (Rey Valera)	Passed	
21	50 Traffic Enforcers	Nikki	Kalye (street)	214 (Rivermaya)	Passed	
22	50 Overseas Filipino Workers	Bing	Abroad	Kastilyong Buhangin (Basil Valdez)	Failed	
23	50 Tricycle Drivers	Dags	Toda (Note: Toda is a Filipino slang word for a tricycle driver. It is also known as the acronym of Tricycle Operators and Drivers Association, which is a group of tricycle operators and drivers in local government units (LGUs) in the Philippines.)	Legs (Hagibis)	Failed	
24	50 Pahinante	Rence	Truck	Toyang (Eraserheads)	Failed	
25	50 Dentists	Bucs	Ngipin (teeth)	Bituing Walang Ningning (Sharon Cuneta)	Passed	
26	50 Magkasintahan at Mag-Ex	Bjay	Love	Tindahan ni Aling Nena (Eraserheads)	Passed	

== Reception ==
Everybody, Sing! drew high viewership on YouTube during its premiere and became a trending topic on Twitter nationwide. It recorded 111,966 concurrent views on its pilot episode (September 24) and rose to 139,668 concurrent views in its second episode on Sunday (September 25).
