= Everybody, Sing! season 1 =

2021 Filipino game show season

Everybody, Sing!
- Season 1
- Hosted by: Vice Ganda
- No. of contestants: 25–100
- No. of winners: 7 groups (Note: Six won on the modified version while one won on the original version.)
- No. of episodes: 36

Release
- Original network: Kapamilya Channel (Note: Originally, the show was going to be aired on ABS-CBN, but did not due to the COVID-19 induced restrictions in the country and the shutdown and denial of ABS-CBN. The show also aired on Kapamilya Online Live and A2Z.)
- Original release: June 5 – October 10, 2021

Season chronology
- Next → Season 2

The first season of the musical game show Everybody, Sing! aired on Kapamilya Channel, Kapamilya Online Live and A2Z from June 5 to October 10, 2021, replacing the third season of Your Face Sounds Familiar and was replaced by Pinoy Big Brother: Kumunity Season 10.

== Overview ==
The game show was first set to premiere on March 15, 2020 on ABS-CBN, replacing Gandang Gabi, Vice!. However, Vice Ganda later revealed on his noontime show It's Showtime that the show was postponed due to the COVID-19 pandemic in the Philippines. The game show later moved its premiere date to June 5, 2021, replacing the third season of Your Face Sounds Familiar.

== Gameplay ==
Each episode's contestants consisted of 25 or 100 individuals from a community group (usually with ages ranging from 18–59), called the songbayanan, and divided equally into five rows. Each row is referred to as SingKo (transl. I sing, lit. 'five'). Each round, one row is chosen by the ChooSera to play a particular game (which includes The ChooSing One, Sing In The Blank, ReverSing, PicSing a Broken Song, EngliSing ang Lyrics, TagaliSing, and LipSing). Each game has a different set of mechanics; however, they have the same goal. Each contestant has two guesses to complete the line of a song. They receive ₱1,000 for each correct guess, and the group gets an additional 2–4 seconds on the jackpot round's timer. The more correct guesses, the greater the chances of winning the jackpot. The group then gets to participate in the jackpot round (Everybody GuesSing), wherein they must name each song that is played. If they name all 10 songs, they share the winning jackpot of ₱500,000.

== Episodes ==
List of episodes
Episode		Contestants	Prize won	Ref.
No.	Air date	Contestants	Prize won	Ref.
1	June 5, 2021	25 Community Pantry Volunteers	₱500,000	
2	June 6, 2021	25 Food and Beverage Service Crew	₱40,000	
3	June 12, 2021	25 Janitors and Cleaners	₱80,000 (Note: Excluding additional cash prize given by Vice Ganda.)	
4	June 13, 2021	25 Delivery Riders	₱20,000	
5	June 19, 2021	25 Grocery Frontliners (Note: This episode was supposed to air on June 13, 2021 but moved to June 19, 2021.)	₱30,000	
6	June 20, 2021	25 Fitness Instructors	₱30,000	
7	June 26, 2021	25 Massage Therapists	₱500,000	
8	June 27, 2021	25 Security Guards	₱20,000	
9	July 3, 2021	25 PGH Employees and Volunteers	₱40,000	
10	July 4, 2021	25 Contact Tracers	₱20,000	
11	July 10, 2021	25 Live Online Sellers	₱40,000	
12	July 11, 2021	25 Kasambahay (Housekeepers)	₱100,000	
13	July 17, 2021	25 Comedy Bar Performers	₱100,000	
14	July 18, 2021	25 Teachers	₱500,000	
15	July 24, 2021	25 Street Food Vendors	₱35,000	
16	July 25, 2021	25 Extras and Talents (Note: 25 Extras and Talents was announced to be featured in the show on June 27, 2021, and was supposed to air on July 3, 2021.)	₱30,000	
17	July 31, 2021	25 Bourne to Hike Mountaineers	₱25,000	
18	August 1, 2021	25 Bus, Jeepney, and Tricycle Drivers	₱500,000	
19	August 7, 2021	25 Seafarers	₱35,000	
20	August 8, 2021	25 Labandero at Labandera (Laundry Workers)	₱35,000	
21	August 21, 2021	25 Barangay Tanod (Village Watchmen)	₱25,000	
22	August 22, 2021	25 Call Center Agents	₱500,000	
23	August 28, 2021	25 Flight Attendants	₱70,000	
24	August 29, 2021	25 Factory Workers	₱500,000	
25	September 4, 2021	25 Tourism Industry Workers	₱15,000	
26	September 5, 2021	25 Stage Performers	₱40,000	
27	September 11, 2021	25 Pageant Winners	₱25,000	
28	September 12, 2021	25 Social Media Content Creators	₱35,000	
29	September 18, 2021	25 National Athletes	₱10,000	
30	September 19, 2021	25 Perya Performers (Fair Performers)	₱35,000	
31	September 25, 2021	100 Haircutters	₱300,000	
32	September 26, 2021	100 Haircutters	₱300,000	
33	October 2, 2021	100 Palengke Vendors (Wet Market Vendors)	₱500,000	
34	October 3, 2021	100 Palengke Vendors (Wet Market Vendors)	₱500,000	
35	October 9, 2021	100 Taal Survivors (January 2020 Taal Eruption Survivors)	₱2,000,000	
36	October 10, 2021	100 Taal Survivors (January 2020 Taal Eruption Survivors)	₱2,000,000	

== Guest vocalists ==
Vice would invite a series of guest singers in lieu of the resident band's lead vocalists.

List of Everybody, Sing! Season 1 guest singers
Episode	Celebrity guest/s	Game	Song played	Ref.
30	Jason Dy and Elha Nympha	Sing in the Blank	Bongga Ka Day (Hotdog)	
30	Jason Dy and Elha Nympha	TagaliSing	Ewan (Imago)	
30	Jason Dy and Elha Nympha	PicSing a Broken Song	Conga (Miami Sound Machine)	
30	Jason Dy and Elha Nympha	The ChooSing One	Pangako (Regine Velasquez and Ogie Alcasid)	
30	Jason Dy and Elha Nympha	ReverSing	Toyang (Eraserheads)	
