= I Can See Your Voice (Philippine game show) season 4 =

Television game show season

I Can See Your Voice
- Season 4
- Starring: MC Muah; Ruffa Gutierrez; Lassy; Negi; Nikko Natividad; Angeline Quinto (Note: Klarisse de Guzman was initially to be included as a SING-vestigator, until she was replaced by Quinto.)
- Hosted by: Main: Luis Manzano; Guest: Bianca Gonzalez (Note: Season highlights: New Gen Divas (ep. 15) member Elha Nympha was absent for unknown reasons, while Fana was also absent due to not yet being a group member at the time of taping.; Bini (ep. 17) member Mikha was absent due to a lock-in taping in the second season of He's Into Her.; In 22nd (and its 200th overall) episode, Bianca Gonzalez became an interim host replacing Luis Manzano, who he also played as a guest artist alongside returning South Border frontman Jay Durias for their duet performance.; As a group, MNL48 (ep. 25) has a different lineup with the following members playing on their games: Team M: Sheki Arzaga, Princess Briquillo, Dana Leanne Brual, and Yzabel Divinagracia Team N: Lara Mae Layar, Abby Trinidad, and Coleen Trinidad Team L: Dian Marie Mercado)
- Winners: Good singers: 13; Bad singers: 16
- No. of episodes: 29

Release
- Original network: Kapamilya Channel; A2Z (simulcast)
- Original release: January 15 – June 19, 2022

Season chronology
- ← Previous; Season 3 Next → Season 5

The fourth season of the Philippine television mystery music game show I Can See Your Voice was originally scheduled to premiere on Kapamilya Channel and A2Z on January 8, 2022, but it was suddenly occupied by a replay of 1MX Manila 2021 in its timeslot instead, and then pushed back later to January 15, 2022.

At the time of filming during the COVID-19 pandemic, health and safety protocols are also implemented.

== Gameplay ==
=== Format ===
According to the original South Korean rules, the guest artist(s) must attempt to eliminate bad singers during its game phase. At the final performance, the last remaining mystery singer is revealed as either good or bad by means of a duet between them and one of the guest artists.

At the end of each round, an eliminated mystery singer gets a consolation prize starting from ₱5,000 (for the first round), ₱10,000 (for the second round), to ₱15,000 (for the third round). If the last remaining mystery singer is good, the guest artist(s) receive an Eye-ward trophy. The winning mystery singer, regardless of being good (SEE-nger) or bad (SEE-ntunado), gets ₱25,000.

=== Rounds ===
1. Everybody Sync
  The mystery singers are divided into batches, (Note: Gameplay note: The Everybody Sync! round may perform through a batch of trios or pairs (in a lip sync battle against each other).) and each of them would have to perform lip sync individually.
2. Two or False
  Each mystery singer is given two different identities as a good and bad singer, with one of them is a real identity.
3. Clues Open
  The host has randomly assigned clues about the mystery singer, and then the guest artist must choose a clue for each one.
  - A Whole New Word — The panelist is given a statement with an assigned "keyword" to one of the remaining mystery singers. Good singers have true statements, while bad singers have their statements fabricated.
  - Bed of Boses — A video recording from a studio session by one of the remaining mystery singers reveal only 0.3 seconds of their singing voice as an additional hint.
  - Message Parlor — The guest artist is presented with a video package featuring a "super fan" by one of the remaining mystery singers.
  - Song Ka Pa — The host reveals a playlist of three "mystery songs" that are appropriated to one of the remaining mystery singers.
  - Tabi-tabi Po — The guest artist asks a question to one of the remaining mystery singers that can answer with non-verbal communication.

== Episodes ==
=== Guest artists ===
Legend:
Good singer
Bad singer

Episode		Guest artist (Note: Players' notes: For the returning guest artists (who also include foreigners and former good singers), names are displayed in italics.; For the mixed groups, names who identified as bad singers are displayed in italics.)	SEE-cret songers (In their respective numbers and aliases)				
#	Date	Guest artist	Elimination order				Winner
#	Date	Guest artist	Everybody Sync	Two or False	Clues Open		Winner
1	January 15, 2022	Janine Gutierrez and Ramon Christopher (Note: Despite not singing, they were still counted as guest artists.)	5. Cristina Malic; (Linggo, Lunes, Marites)	2. Cristina dela Paz; (Store Signal No. 1)	3. Merjulieto Lancin; (Kung Amo na Lang Sana)	4. Micah Ocsan; (Edit Ikaw Na!)	1. Annaliza Ato; Pangarap ko ang Ibigin Cash
2	January 16, 2022	Vina Morales and Cherry Pie Picache	3. Lillia Galias; (Diet Inside to Hold You)	4. Nicole Gamboa; (Sa Classroom, May Batas. Kawal Lumabas!)	1. Diane Aparicio; (Bangus Kapalaran, Humanap ng Iba)	2. Ruby Puda; (Alamang Girl)	5. Mikko Janolo; And I... Tank You!
3	January 22, 2022	Morissette	2. Abigail Sendaydiego; (Ukay Fine, Whatever)	5. Darwin Untalan; (Na-sayaw na ang Lahat)	4. Roy Erickson Fule; (Enchong Smile)	3. Lady Bim Abon; (What Tokyo so Long)	1. Michelle Valencia; Senior ba Sila?
4	January 23, 2022	Kyle Echarri and Jeremy Glinoga	1. Luigi Diona; (Welcome to Hunk Kong)	2. Arwin Cipriano; (Morissette Amoy)	5. Rhen Espinosa; (Fruit Your Hands in the Air!)	3. Remmuel Mabini; (Idol Wanna Miss a Thing)	4. Ivy Rose Mariano; Pa-bangko Sa'yo
5	January 29, 2022	Tawag ng Tanghalan alumni (Reiven Umali, Anthony Castillo, and Adrian Manibale)	1. Jerick Ternida; (Ed-guard Barber)	4. Paolo Griarte; (Work Hard, Palay Hard)	3. Kent Quining; (The Soul Siren, Mina)	2. Ejay Dimaculangan; (May the Best Man Queen)	5. Fritz Gorobat; Laguna de Bike
6	January 30, 2022	This Band	2. Roselyn Salamputan; (Can This Bilang)	1. Armiel de Guia; (Pita Avila)	4. Janette Mamino; (Coach You Be my Number Two?)	5. Nicole Pelayo; (Raket Nga ba Mahal Kita)	3. Aladdin Calis; This Guy's in Love with You, Party
7	February 5, 2022	Gigi De Lana	5. Jefferson Española; (Hidilyn and Seek)	3. Michelle Bingculado; (Kung Ulam mo Lang)	4. Lady Mae Macalolooy; (Pasig Giver)	1. Lydia Joliff; (Beatrice Lugi Gomez)	2. Nichole Panganiban; Is It Too Late Now to Say Sali
8	February 6, 2022	Angela Ken and Anji Salvacion	3. Miguel Zulueta; (Cagayan Volley)	2. James Reyes; (Sun-sign Dizon)	4. Angelique Guico; (Outdoors or Endorse?)	5. Veronica Magnaye; (See You Later, Calculator)	1. Anthony de Domingo; Don't Ask, It's Ilang Story
9	February 12, 2022	The Juans	2. Busty Gutierrez; (Baguio Tayo... Bus a Friend)	3. Ehdward Bayno; (Jowa-na Build a Snowman?)	1. Vincent Jude Estella; (Kopya-cabana)	4. Makkoi Sixto; (Go Ahead. H.R. Choice!)	5. Analiza Melquiades; Hey Maca-reyna
10	February 19, 2022	Gary Valenciano	1. Princess Obispo; (A-meet Austria)	2. Clarissa Valdueza; (My Toes, Chinese, My Shoulder, My Head)	3. Niña David; (Nancy Meeting You)	4. Renz Ian Ranque; (Saging Puso'y Tunay Kang Nag-iisa)	5. Joshua San Antonio; Pedicab-ang Makilala?
11	February 20, 2022	Ice Seguerra	3. Oliver Carlo Caunceran; (Broken Marriage Bow)	1. Gelo Murillo; (Chill This Love)	2. Aldus Cabral Chua; (Katy Ferris)	4. Joanne Alzadon; (I Hopia Don't Mind)	5. Jonah Esmiguel; Gigi de Lata
12	February 26, 2022	Jessa Zaragoza and Dingdong Avanzado	1. Rowel Gonzales; (Mister Stream-boy)	2. Edel Beguia; (Sale-lena Gomez)	3. Rodelio Candelaria; (Prank Sinatra)	5. Babeth Lugasan; (What Are You Wedding For?)	4. John Patrick Martinez; Long Distance Relations-chef
13	February 27, 2022	iDolls (Enzo Almario, Lucas Garcia, and Matty Juniosa)	1. Kaceylyn Lascano; (Para-Tisod, Help me Make a Stand)	5. Millie delos Santos; (Elsa Beautiful Life)	2. AJ Marasigan; (Meet-samis Oriental)	4. Mark Joseph Amor; (Shamcey Shop-shop)	3. Nicole Joan Liao; Kyle Chicha-ri
14	March 5, 2022	Yeng Constantino	1. Wen Gasmeña; (The Good, The Bid, and The Ugly)	2. Marvin Cagbabanua; (Mr. Laba-laba)	5. Erwin Ramirez; (So Turo, Funny How it Seems?)	4. Aniel Rose Atenciana; (Bini Cordero)	3. Jay-ar Almanzor; Isusumbong Kita sa Tagay Ko!
15	March 12, 2022	New Gen Divas (Janine Berdin, Lara Maigue, and Sheena Belarmino)	4. Babylyn Pagdanganan; (Ikaw ang Pangarap... Ikaw Laman)	1. Sarah Cinco; (Anyeong Nangyari sa Ating Dalawa?)	2. Carolina Castañeda; (Breakfast, Lunch, Winner)	3. Khepler Alquigue; (TV or Not TV? That is the Question!)	5. Jayson Dulay; Lahat ay Makakaya, Basta't Kapit-busy!
16	March 13, 2022	Jolina Magdangal and Mark Escueta	4. Merry Mae Holasca; (Ab-nurse Mercado)	1. Patricia Camille Romulo; (Party Austin)	3. Audrey Medrano; (Work Under Fresh-ure)	5. Joan dela Cruz; (Let's Hair it For The Boy)	2. Juver Navara; Paper Parker
17	March 19, 2022	Bini	3. Ken Jama; (Sa Ne-Yo ang Puso Ko)	4. Myra Gamis; (Twinnie the Pooh)	5. Rhex Entiosco; (Staff Right Now!)	2. Austine Pascual; (We've Only Just Bigas)	1. Marc John Bangayan; Alexa I-lakad
18	March 26, 2022	Ogie Alcasid and Vhong Navarro	1. Ariane Fernandez; (Eyelash-sais ng Umaga)	4. Leah Padillo; (Hairy Styles)	2. Shaira Ravarra; (Just Game Me a Reason)	3. Thelma Villanueva; (Tali Parton)	5. Reggie Padillo; Do You See What A.C.?
19	March 27, 2022	BGYO	4. Theresa Dianela; (Just The Way QR)	3. Emily Louise Lustan; (Rosanna Boses)	1. Joshua Obordo; (You're Taiwan That I Want)	5. Niño Dagale; (Pag-ibig Ko'y Account)	2. Dranreb Quizon; Stop! Tinda Name of Love
20	April 2, 2022	Moira Dela Torre and Jason Marvin	3. Arron Sabado; (Mag-anime 'di Biro)	1. Pocka Pocua; (Home Halo da Riles)	5. John Paul Pasigna; (Lovingly Yours, Hele)	4. Melvyn Escaño; (Carbon Kape)	2. Raven Heyres; Tortang Tulong
21	April 9, 2022	KDLex (KD Estrada and Alexa Ilacad)	3. Reggie Santiago; (Annabelle Trauma)	5. Dustin Ugalino; (Lea Salon-ga)	2. Rafael Almadilla; (Ye-ye Vinyl)	1. Odet Ojascastro; (See? I Told You Sew!)	4. Jonel Tadiosa; Meryl Sleep
22	April 23, 2022 April 24, 2022	Luis Manzano and Jay Durias	2. Reyman de Pano; (It's More Fan in the Philippines)	5. Joles Boy Malicdem; (I'd Rider Have Bad Times with You)	1. Ida Marie Doroy; (Wax na Wax Mong Sasabihin)	4. Mary Rose Villacampa; (Chat Kinis)	3. Rhamces Rodriguez; Swim-ply Jessie
23	April 30, 2022	Juris	1. John Arvin Calinao; (Johnny Debt)	5. Lelibeth Paronda; (Sabayang Pag-bigas)	3. Jessie Gamboa; (My Loneliness is Kilig Me)	4. Dionesio Sinilong; (China Maulit Muli)	2. Carlo Lara; Ex-ta-si, Espasol
24	May 7, 2022	Jugs and Teddy	3. Aaron Cahiles; (Sa Ulo ng mga Nagbabagang Maleta)	1. Marl Owen Pascion; (Check-in Afritada)	4. Jasmin Paulo; (Video Kahera)	5. Aries Concepcion; (Kape Barbell)	2. Sydney Alipao; Adjourn ka Magaling!
25	May 21, 2022	MNL48	1. Shanchai Biando; (Papunta ka pa Lang, Public na Ako!)	4. Princess Miralles; (Janine Hardin)	2. EJ Ballebar; (Bola Abdul)	3. Timothy Tapia; (Friend Panopio)	5. Lemuel Tabane; Cane we Still be Friends?
26	May 29, 2022	BearKada (Shanaia Gomez, Gello Marquez, and Vivoree Esclito)	2. Kempee Elleva; (Bikining I-theme)	3. Jocelyn Tanqueco; (Bully-tin mo Ako sa Hiwaga ng Iyong Pagmamahal)	5. Mary Joy Tabora; (Frosty the Suman)	1. Emmanuel Tura; (If You Like It, Butcher Ring on It)	4. Kate Chariz Quero; Sales U Been Gone
27	June 4, 2022	TNT Boys	4. Lloyd Virgo Jusay; (Oil Fries Hike)	1. Rhocs Roco; (Kain Carpenter)	5. Timothy Rones; (Woke up Like Dish)	2. Clark Peña Dizon; (Icing Trees are Green)	3. John Kenneth Ruiz; Ihaw ang Lahat sa Akin
28	June 18, 2022	HRNA (Rob Deniel, Adie, and Arthur Nery)	2. Lea Sangyan; (Kung A-coach na Lang Sana)	1. Luzviminda Espiritu; (Ipong Adarna)	3. Ron Dacles; (Lupa Gutierrez)	4. Daniel Alcantara; (Sand Darating ang Umaga?)	5. Bryan Mauri; You Film up my Senses
29	June 19, 2022	Madam Inutz and Samantha Bernardo	4. Ginalyn Javines; (Join to the World)	3. Charles Torres; (Jacket ka pa Nakita?)	1. Ian Jeffrey Cadiang; (Sweep Caroline)	5. Mariel Joy Llantero; (California King Bead)	2. Gregory Gajasan; Ang Ningning ng 'Yong mga Mata'y Nahanap ko sa mga Tele

=== SING-vestigators ===
Legend:
Regular SING-vestigator
Additional SING-vestigator
Guest SING-vestigator

Apps		Panelists in attendance (Sorted by first appearance, with episode designations)
g#	p#	Panelists in attendance (Sorted by first appearance, with episode designations)
29	2	Lassy and Negi (1–29)
27	1	Nikko Natividad (1–21, 24–29)
26	1	MC Muah (1–9, 12–24, 26–29)
12	1	Angeline Quinto (7–17, 24)
10	1	Ruffa Gutierrez (12, 16, 18–21, 25, 27–29)
6	1	Klarisse de Guzman (1–6)
4	1	Madam Inutz (23, 25–26, 28)
3	1	Alora Sasam (22–23, 26)
2	1	Jessy Mendiola (14, 17)
1	2	Charlie Dizon (10); Vilma Santos-Recto (22)
