= List of I Can See Your Voice (Philippine game show) episodes =

Television game show episode list

About the series
- I Can See Your Voice is a Philippine television mystery music game show produced by ABS-CBN Studios and broadcast by ABS-CBN, Kapamilya Channel, A2Z, and TV5, featuring its format based on the South Korean program of the same title.
- More about the series

Episodes overview
- Total episode(s): 314
- Aired episode(s): 307
- Special episode(s): 7

The Philippine television mystery music game show I Can See Your Voice has played a total of five seasons and 314 episodes; broadcasting on four different networks — ABS-CBN (from September 16, 2017 to March 14, 2020) and Kapamilya Channel (from October 24, 2020 to July 14, 2024; with simulcasts on A2Z and TV5 since March 11, 2023). (Note: The 5th season began airing on Kapamilya Channel and A2Z at episode 1 on March 4, 2023, followed by TV5 at episode 2 on March 11, 2023. However, some episodes are also delayed during PBA games.) As for milestone games, Yassi Pressman and Sam Concepcion played in the 100th episode on September 30, 2018; Luis Manzano and Jay Durias in the 200th episode on April 23 and 24, 2022; and Maki with Zushibois Band in the 300th episode on June 22, 2024.

Throughout its broadcast, the Philippine adaptation played first games featuring an entire lineup of celebrities, pairs, groups, the elderly, and foreigners as mystery singers. (Note: First games featuring lineup-specific mystery singers: Celebrities — TNT Boys on September 16, 2018; Pairs — Marcelito Pomoy on September 29, 2018; Groups — TJ Monterde and KZ Tandingan on December 22, 2018; Elderly — Doris Bigornia on December 14, 2019; Foreigners — Ethel Booba on December 28, 2019) It is also known for airing back-to-back games through separate episodes in common practice, which resulted in having two seasons of at least 100 episodes aired. (Note: The 1st season has originally scheduled to air for 26 episodes (at 13 weeks), with Moira Dela Torre playing on its tentative [26th episode] finale on December 10, 2017. Due to "unprecedented high ratings", it was later added by 102 episodes (at 54 weeks) until the formal conclusion on January 6, 2019.)

== Series overview ==
Season	Episodes	Originally released			Good singers	Bad singers
Season	Episodes	First released	Last released	Network	Good singers	Bad singers
1	123	September 16, 2017	January 6, 2019	ABS-CBN	70	52
2	30	August 10, 2019	March 14, 2020	ABS-CBN	18	12
3	25	October 24, 2020	February 7, 2021	Kapamilya Channel	14	11
4	29	January 15, 2022	June 19, 2022	Kapamilya Channel	13	16
5	100	March 4, 2023	July 14, 2024	Kapamilya Channel	49	51
Sp	7	September 9, 2018	December 28, 2019	—N/a	4	3

== Episodes ==
=== Season 1 (2017–19) ===
List of season 1 episodes
No. overall	No. in season	Guest artist(s)	Player order (Note: It refers to the guest artist(s) that have played in according to their first game; returning guest artists (which also include foreigners or former good singers, with their names displaying in italics) are not counted.)	Original release date	PHL rating (national)
2017
1	1	Gary Valenciano	1	September 16, 2017	19.5%
2	2	Ogie Alcasid	2	September 17, 2017	15.3%
3	3	Lea Salonga	3	September 23, 2017	20.1%
4	4	Lani Misalucha	4	September 24, 2017	16.7%
5	5	Randy Santiago	5	September 30, 2017	19.6%
6	6	Jolina Magdangal	6	October 1, 2017	18.2%
7	7	Martin Nievera	7	October 7, 2017	15.7%
8	8	Yeng Constantino	8	October 8, 2017	16.3%
9	9	Jessa Zaragoza	9	October 14, 2017	18.2%
10	10	Zsa Zsa Padilla	10	October 15, 2017	17.6%
11	11	Jed Madela	11	October 21, 2017	15.3%
12	12	Eva Eugenio	12	October 22, 2017	17.6%
13	13	Jake Zyrus	13	October 28, 2017	16.7%
14	14	Mike Hanopol (Juan de la Cruz Band)	14	October 29, 2017	14.2%
15	15	APO Hiking Society (Note: Highlights: APO Hiking Society designated as a group, in which different members playing on subsequent games are actually returned; Danny Javier, Boboy Garrovillo, and Jim Paredes have been played.; Freestyle designated as a group, in which different members playing on subsequent games are actually returned; Top Suzara and Jinky Vidal have been played.; Neocolours (s2 ep. 14) designated as new players, which include the returning Ito Rapadas.; Smokey Mountain (s3 ep. 15) designated as new players, which include members Jeffrey Hidalgo and the returning Geneva Cruz.; As a group, MNL48 has a different lineup with the following members playing on their games: Team M: Jamie Alberto, Sheki Arzaga, Alice de Leon, Laney Sañosa (from s3); Princess Briquillo, Dana Leanne Brual, and Yzabel Divinagracia (from s4) Team N: Abby Trinidad, Coleen Trinidad, Jaydee Villaruel (from s3); and Lara Mae Layar (from s4) Team L: Gabb Skribikin (from s3); and Dian Marie Mercado (from s4): New Gen Divas (s4 ep. 15) member Elha Nympha was absent for unknown reasons, while Fana was also absent due to not yet being a group member at the time of taping.; Bini (s4 ep. 17) member Mikha was absent due to a lock-in taping in the second season of He's Into Her.; Drag Race Philippines alumni Corazon Filipinas and Turing Quinto (s5 ep. 12) are assisted by the returning Ice Seguerra for his duet performance.; VST & Company (s5 ep. 20) designated as a group, in which different members playing on subsequent games are actually returned; Male Rigor and Monet Gaskell have been played.; Crazy as Pinoy (s5 ep. 40) designated as new players, which include the returning Bassilyo.; As part of its transition to then-upcoming quiz game show Rainbow Rumble, Wrive (s5 ep. 100) played as guest artists.)	15	November 4, 2017	19%
16	16	KZ Tandingan	16	November 5, 2017	16.2%
17	17	Nina	17	November 11, 2017	19.3%
18	18	Jaya	18	November 12, 2017	15.3%
19	19	Toni Gonzaga	19	November 18, 2017	15.1%
20	20	Erik Santos	20	November 19, 2017	15.7%
21	21	Angeline Quinto	21	November 25, 2017	16%
22	22	Dingdong Avanzado	22	November 26, 2017	15%
23	23	Karla Estrada	23	December 2, 2017	16%
24	24	Richard Poon	24	December 3, 2017	13%
25	25	Jamie Rivera	25	December 9, 2017	18.5%
26	26	Moira Dela Torre	26	December 10, 2017	15.2%
27	27	Vice Ganda	27	December 23, 2017	19.4%
28	28	Jett Pangan (The Dawn)	28	December 24, 2017	17.3%
29	29	Kyla	29	December 30, 2017	17.2%
30	30	Jenine Desiderio	30	December 31, 2017	18.1%
2018
31	31	Roselle Nava	31	January 6, 2018	19.6%
32	32	Ito Rapadas (Neocolours)	32	January 7, 2018	16.6%
33	33	Frenchie Dy	33	January 13, 2018	20.2%
34	34	Alex Gonzaga	34	January 14, 2018	15.3%
35	35	Juris	35	January 20, 2018	21.1%
36	36	James Reid	36	January 21, 2018	17.8%
37	37	Morissette	37	January 27, 2018	22.1%
38	38	Billy Crawford	38	January 28, 2018	18%
39	39	Richard Yap	39	February 3, 2018	22.6%
40	40	Claire dela Fuente	40	February 4, 2018	14.4%
41	41	Jona Viray	41	February 10, 2018	20.8%
42	42	Piolo Pascual	42	February 11, 2018	15.7%
43	43	Salbakuta	43	February 17, 2018	21.2%
44	44	Vina Morales	44	February 18, 2018	16.9%
45	45	Iñigo Pascual	45	February 24, 2018	19.1%
46	46	Jay R	46	February 25, 2018	16.6%
47	47	Gino Padilla	47	March 3, 2018	18.2%
48	48	Darren Espanto	48	March 4, 2018	15.5%
49	49	Jovit Baldivino	49	March 10, 2018	18.1%
50	50	Rey Valera	50	March 11, 2018	14.3%
51	51	Lilet	51	March 17, 2018	18.5%
52	52	Marc Tupaz (Shamrock)	52	March 24, 2018	15.4%
53	53	K Brosas	53	March 25, 2018	17.8%
54	54	BoybandPH	54	April 1, 2018	14.6%
55	55	Jason Dy	55	April 7, 2018	17.8%
56	56	Hajji Alejandro	56	April 8, 2018	16.6%
57	57	Nadine Lustre	57	April 14, 2018	14.2%
58	58	Jugs and Teddy	58–59	April 15, 2018	14.7%
59	59 (Note: This episode was aired in two parts on separate air dates.)	Luis Manzano (Note: Despite not singing, they were still counted as guest artists.) and Vilma Santos-Recto	60	April 21, 2018	15.5% 14.9%
59	59	Luis Manzano and Vilma Santos-Recto	61	April 22, 2018	15.5% 14.9%
60	60	Sharon Cuneta	62	April 28, 2018	16.5%
61	61	Kim Chiu	63	April 29, 2018	13.9%
62	62	Wency Cornejo	64	May 5, 2018	15.9%
63	63	Arci Muñoz	65	May 6, 2018	16.1%
64	64	Nyoy Volante	66	May 12, 2018	15.9%
65	65	Rachel Alejandro	67	May 13, 2018	14.9%
66	66	Top Suzara (Freestyle)	68	May 19, 2018	15.4%
67	67	Janella Salvador	69	May 20, 2018	15.7%
68	68	Shanti Dope	70	May 26, 2018	17.2%
69	69	Karylle and Yael Yuzon	71–72	May 27, 2018	13.2%
70	70	Anne Curtis	73	June 2, 2018	14.4%
71	71	Jay Durias (South Border)	74	June 3, 2018	15.6%
72	72	Kean Cipriano	75	June 9, 2018	14.6%
73	73	Maymay Entrata	76	June 10, 2018	13.5%
74	74	Marco Sison	77	June 16, 2018	14.4%
75	75	Pokwang	78	June 17, 2018	14.2%
76	76	Maja Salvador	79	June 23, 2018	16.5%
77	77	The Voice Teens alumni (Jona Soquite, Jeremy Glinoga, and Isabella Vinzon)	80–82	June 24, 2018	12.5%
78	78	Wacky Kiray	83	June 30, 2018	13%
79	79	Aegis	84	July 1, 2018	13.5%
80	80	Mitoy Yonting	85	July 7, 2018	12.6%
81	81	Ethel Booba	86	July 8, 2018	13.4%
82	82	Janine Berdin	87	July 14, 2018	16.2%
83	83	Lloyd Umali	88	July 15, 2018	13%
84	84	The Day After Valentine's cast (JC Santos and Bela Padilla)	89–90	July 21, 2018	16.2%
85	85	Imelda Papin	91	July 22, 2018	13.6%
86	86	Andrew E.	92	July 28, 2018	15.6%
87	87	Michael Pangilinan	93	July 29, 2018	13.6%
88	88	Rico J. Puno	94	August 4, 2018	16.4%
89	89	Isay Alvarez and Robert Seña	95–96	August 5, 2018	13.5%
90	90	Pilita Corrales	97	August 11, 2018	15.2%
91	91	Jericho Rosales	98	August 12, 2018	12.2%
92	92	Melai Cantiveros	99	August 18, 2018	14.2%
93	93	Sam Milby	100	August 19, 2018	11.9%
94	94	Miss Granny cast (Sarah Geronimo, Xian Lim, and James Reid)	101–102	August 25, 2018	14.9%
95	95	SoulJa (Jaya and Jason Dy)	—	August 26, 2018	13.3%
96	96	Ice Seguerra	103	September 1, 2018	13%
97	97	Dulce	104	September 2, 2018	11.2%
98	98	Celeste Legaspi	105	September 8, 2018	14.2%
99	99	Sharon Cuneta	—	September 22, 2018	13.1% 11.1%
99	99	Sharon Cuneta	—	September 23, 2018	13.1% 11.1%
100	100	Yassi Pressman and Sam Concepcion	109–110	September 30, 2018	11.1%
101	101	Gloc-9	111	October 6, 2018	11.9%
102	102	Jinky Vidal (Freestyle)	—	October 7, 2018	9.5%
103	103	Bea Alonzo and Aga Muhlach	112–113	October 13, 2018	9.8%
104	104	Nikki Valdez and John Lapus	114–115	October 14, 2018	10.2%
105	105	Joey Generoso (Side A)	116	October 20, 2018	8.2%
106	106	Janno Gibbs	117	October 21, 2018	11.1%
107	107	Pepe Herrera	118	October 27, 2018	10.9%
108	108	Kuh Ledesma	119	October 28, 2018	10.5%
109	109	ASAP G! (Darren Espanto, Kyle Echarri, and Jayda Avanzado)	120–121	November 3, 2018	10.9%
110	110	Jodi Sta. Maria	122	November 10, 2018	11.3%
111	111	Bugoy Drilon and Liezel Garcia	123–124	November 11, 2018	11%
112	112	Regine Velasquez	125	November 17, 2018	11%
113	113	Kris Lawrence	126	November 18, 2018	9.7%
114	114	DIVAS (Kyla and Yeng Constantino)	—	November 24, 2018	12.5%
115	115	Noven Belleza and Sam Mangubat	127–128	November 25, 2018	10.4%
116	116	Birit Queens (Jona Viray, Klarisse de Guzman, and Morissette)	129	December 1, 2018	10.2%
117	117	Louie Heredia	130	December 2, 2018	10.6%
118	118	Abrenica Brothers (Aljur and Vin Abrenica)	131–132	December 8, 2018	13.7%
119	119	Jessa Zaragoza and Dingdong Avanzado	—	December 9, 2018	11%
120	120	Gonzaga Sisters (Toni and Alex Gonzaga)	—	December 23, 2018	13.8%
121	121	Nikki Valdez, Roselle Nava, and Desiree del Valle	134	December 29, 2018	12.8%
2019
122	122	Bayani Agbayani and Edu Manzano	135–136	January 5, 2019	12.8%
123	123	Gary Valenciano	—	January 6, 2019	11.2%

=== Season 2 (2019–20) ===
List of season 2 episodes
No. overall	No. in season	Guest artist(s)	Player order	Original release date	PHL rating (national)
2019
124	1	Momshies (Karla Estrada, Jolina Magdangal, and Melai Cantiveros)	—	August 10, 2019	16.7%
125	2	Nadine Lustre	—	August 17, 2019	17.1%
126	3	Just a Stranger cast (Anne Curtis and Marco Gumabao)	137	August 24, 2019	17.2%
127	4	Ben&Ben	138	August 31, 2019	13.5%
128	5	Idol Philippines alumni (Lance Busa, Lucas Garcia, and Zephanie Dimaranan)	139–141	September 7, 2019	14.5%
129	6	Kamp Kawayan (Elha Nympha and Bamboo)	142–143	September 14, 2019	12.2%
130	7	MayWard (Maymay Entrata and Edward Barber)	144	September 21, 2019	14.8%
131	8	Alcasid Family (Ogie and Leila Alcasid)	145	September 28, 2019	13.3%
132	9	Yassi Pressman	—	October 5, 2019	12.6%
133	10	BuDaKhel (Bugoy Drilon, Daryl Ong, and Michael Pangilinan)	146	October 12, 2019	11.4%
134	11	Pascual Family (Piolo and Iñigo Pascual)	—	October 19, 2019	12%
135	12	Unforgettable cast (Sarah Geronimo, Ara Mina, and Kim Molina)	147–148	October 26, 2019	9.2%
136	13	Sheryn Regis	149	November 2, 2019	12.3%
137	14	Neocolours	150	November 9, 2019	11.7%
138	15	Titos of Manila (Christopher de Leon, Tirso Cruz III, and Edgar Mortiz)	151–153	November 16, 2019	9.7%
139	16	The Heiress cast (McCoy de Leon and Janella Salvador)	154	November 23, 2019	10.3%
140	17	Elaine Duran	155	November 30, 2019	8.8%
141	18	OPM Hitmen (Chad Borja, Rannie Raymundo, Richard Reynoso, and Renz Verano)	156–159	December 7, 2019	10.3%
142	19	The Voice Kids alumni (Vanjoss Bayaban, Cyd Pangca, and Carmelle Collado)	161–163	December 21, 2019	10.8%
2020
143	20	SB19	164	January 4, 2020	10.2%
144	21	Arnel Pineda	165	January 11, 2020	12.9%
145	22	Gonzaga Sisters (Toni and Alex Gonzaga)	—	January 18, 2020	10.5%
146	23	Task Force Agila (Smugglaz and Bassilyo)	166–167	January 25, 2020	8.9%
147	24	VinaShine (Vina Morales and Sunshine Cruz)	168	February 1, 2020	11.4%
148	25	Juris and Sitti	169	February 8, 2020	11%
149	26	James, Pat, and Dave (Awra Briguela, Ronnie Alonte, and Donny Pangilinan)	170–172	February 15, 2020	12.1%
150	27	The Gold Squad (Kyle Echarri, Francine Diaz, Seth Fedelin, and Andrea Brillantes)	173–175	February 22, 2020	13.3%
151	28	A Soldier's Heart cast (Vin Abrenica, Nash Aguas, Gerald Anderson, Yves Flores, and Elmo Magalona)	176–179	February 29, 2020	13.2%
152	29	Geneva Cruz	180	March 7, 2020	12.9%
153	30	Frankie Pangilinan	181	March 14, 2020	8.8%

=== Season 3 (2020–21) ===
List of season 3 episodes
No. overall	No. in season	Guest artist(s)	Player order	Original release date
2020
154	1	Nina	—	October 24, 2020
155	2	Jona Viray	—	October 25, 2020
156	3	Janine Berdin	—	October 31, 2020
157	4	Jed Madela	—	November 1, 2020
158	5	Jason Dy	—	November 7, 2020
159	6	Jaya	—	November 8, 2020
160 (Note: These two episodes were initially scheduled to air for its 2nd season as they already finished production before the COVID-19 pandemic.)	7	Donnalyn Bartolome	182	November 14, 2020
161	8	Randy Santiago	—	November 15, 2020
162	9	KZ Tandingan	—	November 21, 2020
163	10	Zsa Zsa Padilla	—	November 22, 2020
164	11	Martin Nievera	—	November 28, 2020
165	12	Elha Nympha and Jeremy Glinoga	—	November 29, 2020
166	13	Jovit Baldivino and Marcelito Pomoy	—	December 5, 2020
167	14	Iñigo Pascual	—	December 6, 2020
168	15	Smokey Mountain	183	December 12, 2020
169	16	Barbie Almabis and Martin Honasan	184–185	December 13, 2020
170	17	Maymay Entrata	—	December 19, 2020
2021
171	18	Jamie Rivera	—	January 9, 2021
172	19	Jay R	—	January 10, 2021
173	20	Agot Isidro	186	January 16, 2021
174	21	Nyoy Volante and Bituin Escalante	187	January 17, 2021
175	22	Mitoy Yonting and Klarisse de Guzman	—	January 23, 2021
176	23	MNL48	188	January 24, 2021
177	24	Ogie Alcasid	—	February 6, 2021
178	25	Regine Velasquez	—	February 7, 2021

=== Season 4 (2022) ===
List of season 4 episodes
No. overall	No. in season	Guest artist(s)	Player order	Original release date
179	1	Janine Gutierrez and Ramon Christopher	189–190	January 15, 2022
180	2	Vina Morales and Cherry Pie Picache	191	January 16, 2022
181	3	Morissette	—	January 22, 2022
182	4	Kyle Echarri and Jeremy Glinoga	—	January 23, 2022
183	5	Tawag ng Tanghalan alumni (Reiven Umali, Anthony Castillo, and Adrian Manibale)	192–194	January 29, 2022
184	6	This Band	195	January 30, 2022
185	7	Gigi De Lana	196	February 5, 2022
186	8	Angela Ken and Anji Salvacion	197–198	February 6, 2022
187	9	The Juans	199	February 12, 2022
188	10	Gary Valenciano	—	February 19, 2022
189	11	Ice Seguerra	—	February 20, 2022
190	12	Jessa Zaragoza and Dingdong Avanzado	—	February 26, 2022
191	13	iDolls (Enzo Almario, Lucas Garcia, and Matty Juniosa)	200–201	February 27, 2022
192	14	Yeng Constantino	—	March 5, 2022
193	15	New Gen Divas (Janine Berdin, Lara Maigue, and Sheena Belarmino)	202–203	March 12, 2022
194	16	Jolina Magdangal and Mark Escueta	204	March 13, 2022
195	17	Bini	205	March 19, 2022
196	18	Ogie Alcasid and Vhong Navarro	206	March 26, 2022
197	19	BGYO	207	March 27, 2022
198	20	Moira Dela Torre and Jason Marvin	208	April 2, 2022
199	21	KDLex (KD Estrada and Alexa Ilacad)	209–210	April 9, 2022
200	22	Luis Manzano and Jay Durias	—	April 23, 2022 April 24, 2022
201	23	Juris	—	April 30, 2022
202	24	Jugs and Teddy	—	May 7, 2022
203	25	MNL48	—	May 21, 2022
204	26	BearKada (Shanaia Gomez, Gello Marquez, and Vivoree Esclito)	211–213	May 29, 2022
205	27	TNT Boys	—	June 4, 2022
206	28	HRNA (Rob Deniel, Adie, and Arthur Nery)	214–216	June 18, 2022
207	29	Madam Inutz and Samantha Bernardo	217–218	June 19, 2022

=== Season 5 (2023–24) ===
List of season 5 episodes
No. overall	No. in season	Guest artist(s)	Player order	Original release date
2023
208	1	APO Hiking Society	—	March 4, 2023
209	2	Darren Espanto	—	March 5, 2023
210	3	AlJay (Aljon Mendoza and Jayda Avanzado)	219	March 11, 2023
211	4	The Voice Kids cast (Martin Nievera, Bamboo, and Robi Domingo)	220	March 12, 2023
212	5	Hori7on	221	March 18, 2023
213	6	Pinoy Big Brother: Otso Housemates (Seth Fedelin, Criza Ta-a, and Karina Bautista)	222–223	March 19, 2023
214	7	Alamat	224	March 25, 2023
215	8	Nikki Valdez and Roselle Nava	—	March 26, 2023
216	9	Idol Philippines alumni (Kice and Khimo Gumatay)	225–226	April 1, 2023
217	10	Raymond Lauchengco	227	April 2, 2023
218	11	John Arcilla	228	April 9, 2023
219	12	Drag Race Philippines alumni (Corazon Filipinas, Turing Quinto, and Ice Seguerra)	229–230	April 15, 2023
220	13	Kim Molina and Jerald Napoles	231	April 16, 2023
221	14	Luis Manzano and Joey Generoso	—	April 22, 2023
222	15	Frenchie Dy and Bituin Escalante	—	April 29, 2023
223	16	Lyca Gairanod	232	April 30, 2023
224	17	Vina Morales	—	May 7, 2023
225	18	Pops Fernandez	233	May 13, 2023
226	19	ASAP Sessionistas (Juris, Sitti, and Princess Velasco)	234	May 14, 2023
227	20	VST & Company	235	May 20, 2023
228	21	SB19	—	May 27, 2023
229	22	Dilaw	236	May 28, 2023
230	23	Randy Santiago	—	June 3, 2023
231	24	Tawag ng Tanghalan alumni (Marko Rudio, Lyka Estrella, and Villier Villalobo)	237–239	June 10, 2023
232	25	Beks (Donita Nose, Divine Tetay, and Tonton Soriano)	240–242	June 11, 2023
233	26	Cattleya Killer cast (Zsa Zsa Padilla and Ricky Davao)	243	June 17, 2023
234	27	Marco Sison and Nonoy Zuñiga	244	June 18, 2023
235	28	Regine Velasquez	—	June 25, 2023
236	29	Sheryn Regis and Ima Castro	245	July 1, 2023
237	30	Gino Padilla	—	July 2, 2023
238	31	Laurel Family (Ayen and Franco Laurel)	246–247	July 9, 2023
239	32	1st.One	248	July 15, 2023
240	33	Pira-pirasong Paraiso cast (KD Estrada, Alexa Ilacad, Ronnie Alonte, Loisa Andalio, Elisse Joson, and Charlie Dizon)	249–251	July 22, 2023
241	34	Ria Atayde, Jane Oineza, and Lyka Estrella	252–253	July 23, 2023
242	35	Mayonnaise	254	July 30, 2023
243	36	Tres Marias (Cooky Chua, Bayang Barrios, and Lolita Carbon)	255–257	August 5, 2023
244	37	Jamie Rivera, Fabio Santos, and Imogen Cantong	258–259	August 12, 2023
245	38	Agsunta	260	August 19, 2023
246	39	YGIG	261	August 20, 2023
247	40	Crazy as Pinoy	262	August 26, 2023
248	41	PLUUS	263	September 3, 2023
249	42	Fractured cast (Francine Diaz, Seth Fedelin, Jeremiah Lisbo, Raven Rigor, and Sean Tristan)	264–266	September 10, 2023
250	43	Erik Santos	—	September 16, 2023
251	44	JMielle (JM dela Cerna and Marielle Montellano)	267–268	September 17, 2023
252	45	Jireh Lim	269	September 24, 2023
253	46	Senior High cast (Gela Atayde, Elijah Canlas, Kyle Echarri, Miggy Jimenez, and Daniela Stranner)	270–273	October 1, 2023
254	47	Sandara Park (Note: Foreign guest artists: South Korea — Sandara Park; United Kingdom — Kobie Brown)	274	October 7, 2023
255	48	Maymay Entrata	—	October 14, 2023
256	49	VXON	275	October 22, 2023
257	50	Ara Mina	—	October 28, 2023
258	51	Nina	—	November 4, 2023
259	52	Nobita	276	November 12, 2023
260	53	Bini	—	November 19, 2023
261	54	Shake, Rattle & Roll Extreme cast (AC Bonifacio, Sarah Edwards, and Paolo Gumabao)	277–279	November 25, 2023
262	55	In His Mother's Eyes cast (Roderick Paulate, LA Santos, and Maricel Soriano)	280–282	November 26, 2023
263	56	Janella Salvador	—	December 2, 2023
264	57	Mitch Valdez and Tessie Tomas	283–284	December 3, 2023
265	58	Renz Verano	—	December 9, 2023
266	59	When I Met You in Tokyo cast (Christopher de Leon, Darren Espanto, John Gabriel, Vilma Santos-Recto, and Lynn Ynchausti-Cruz)	285–286	December 10, 2023
267	60	Tabing Ilog: the Musical cast (Kobie Brown, Akira Morishita (BGYO), Benedix Ramos, Anji Salvacion, and Jude Servilla)	287–289	December 23, 2023
268	61	Sharon Cuneta	—	December 24, 2023
269	62	G22	290	December 30, 2023
270	63	Magnus Haven	291	December 31, 2023
2024
271	64	JRoa	292	January 6, 2024
272	65	Lara Maigue and Gian Magdangal	293	January 7, 2024
273	66	Richard Reynoso	—	January 13, 2024
274	67	Rosanna Roces	294	January 20, 2024
275	68	SunKissed Lola	295	January 27, 2024
276	69	Aga Muhlach	—	February 3, 2024
277	70	Toni Fowler	296	February 10, 2024
278	71	Ogie Alcasid	—	February 11, 2024
279	72	Tawag ng Tanghalan alumni (Vensor Domasig, Eunice Encarnada, and Rea Gen Villareal)	297–299	February 18, 2024
280	73	RnB Boys (Lucas Garcia, Bryan Chong, and JM Yosures)	300–301	February 25, 2024
281	74	Kenaniah and Arthur Miguel	302–303	March 3, 2024
282	75	6cyclemind	304	March 9, 2024
283	76	Michael de Mesa	305	March 16, 2024
284	77	Acel Bisa	306	March 23, 2024
285	78	I Belong to the Zoo	307	March 31, 2024
286	79	Justin (SB19)	—	April 6, 2024
287	80	Gary Valenciano	—	April 13, 2024
288	81	Billy Crawford and Vhong Navarro	—	April 21, 2024
289	82	Wency Cornejo	—	April 28, 2024
290	83	Neocolours	—	May 4, 2024
291	84	Katrina Velarde	308	May 5, 2024
292	85	BGYO	—	May 11, 2024
293	86	Rachel Alejandro	—	May 12, 2024
294	87	Lorraine Galvez and Jeremy Glinoga	309	May 18, 2024
295	88	The Juans	—	May 19, 2024
296	89	Bugoy Drilon	—	May 25, 2024
297	90	KAIA	310	May 26, 2024
298	91	Juan Caoile and Kyleswish	311–312	June 15, 2024
299	92	Chad Borja	—	June 16, 2024
300	93	Maki and Zushibois Band	313–314	June 22, 2024
301	94	Fe de los Reyes	315	June 23, 2024
302	95	Pablo (SB19)	—	June 29, 2024
303	96	Mark Carpio	316	June 30, 2024
304	97	Kakai Bautista	317	July 6, 2024
305	98	Pamilya Sagrado cast (Tirso Cruz III and Grae Fernandez)	318	July 7, 2024
306	99	Cup of Joe	319	July 13, 2024
307	100	Wrive	320	July 14, 2024

== Specials ==
List of special episodes
No.	Title	Guest artist(s)	Player order	Original release date	PHL rating (national)
1	"Best Mode"	—	—	September 9, 2018	12.7%
2	"Kalokalike special"	Daniel Padilla	106	September 15, 2018	10.5%
3	"Celebrity special"	TNT Boys	107	September 16, 2018	11.5%
4	"Iba Two!"	Marcelito Pomoy	108	September 29, 2018	13.5%
5	"Groups special"	TJ Monterde and KZ Tandingan	133	December 22, 2018	11.9%
6	"Seniors special"	Doris Bigornia	160	December 14, 2019	7.1%
7	"International edition"	Ethel Booba	—	December 28, 2019	10.5%
