= Danny Tan =

Filipino musician (born 1959)

- Born: Daniel Surian Tan; July 29, 1959 (age 67); Jolo, Sulu, Philippines
- Genres: Pop; traditional; musical theatre; film score
- Occupations: Arranger; conductor; songwriter; music director; record producer
- Years active: 1980–present
- Labels: GMA; Sony Music

Daniel Surian Tan (born July 29, 1959), simply known as Danny Tan, is a Filipino musician known for his songwriting and musical directing for the Philippine movie, television, theatre, and recording industries. He is associated with Ryan Cayabyab, Raul Mitra, and Regine Velasquez. He was a student of National Artist Lucio San Pedro at the University of the Philippines College of Music. He was among those Filipino artists commissioned for the 2019 Southeast Asian Games opening performance, under the direction of Floy Quintos.

== Career ==
In 1989, Tan did the musical arrangements for Regine Velasquez at the 2nd Asia Pacific Song Festival held in Hong Kong where Velasquez emerged as champion. In 1991, Tan arranged the Jose Javier Reyes-composed song "Hindi Sapat ang Lahat" for the movie The Real Life of Pacita M starring Nora Aunor. The musical score won him a 1991 Metro Manila Film Festival award and a 1992 Star Award.

For the Philippine millennium celebration covered by BBC in 2000, Tan composed the song "Written in the Sand" which was sung by Regine Velasquez at the fountain area of The Peninsula Manila Hotel, along with 2,000 children. The event was televised in 67 broadcast networks globally, and was aired live through GMA Network in the Philippines.

In 2007, GMA Network produced a singing competition for the younger age bracket Popstar Kids, hosted by Kyla, and aired it on QTV 11 (now GTV). Tan was its musical director and consequently become manager of the music group SugarPop. The group was consisted of the top 5 finalists of the reality singing contest: Rita Iringan, Julie Anne San Jose, Vanessa Rangadhol, Pocholo Bismonte, and Renzo Almario.

In 2008, GMA Network produced the second incarnation of the Idol franchise in the Philippines with Pinoy Idol, where Tan served as musical director.

In 2009, Tan served as one of the judges of GMA 7's reality singing competition Are You The Next Big Star? along with Pops Fernandez, Randy Santiago, Mon Faustino, and Annie Faustino. The show was hosted by Regine Velasquez.

He was nominated with Sherwin Castillo for Asintado in the category Best Musical Score at the 2015 FAMAS Awards.

He is a pet industry entrepreneur in the Philippines, starting in 2000.

== Accusations of sexual abuse ==
In 2024, singer and actor Gerald Santos publicly alleged to have been raped as a child in 2005 by Tan. Following this, singer Enzo Almario accused Tan of also sexually abusing him as a child, during Almario's tenure with juvenile pop group Sugarpop.

== Awards ==
Year	Award Body	Category	Results
1997	Awit Award	Best Christmas Recording	Won
1997	Awit Award	Best Traditional Recording	Won
1997	Awit Award	Best Musical Arrangement	Won
2010	Awit Award	Best Vocal Arrangement	Won
