= Love Yourself (disambiguation) =

"Love Yourself" is a 2015 single by Justin Bieber.

Love Yourself may also refer to:

== Health ==
- LoveYourself, a HIV/AIDS organization in the Philippines

== Music ==
=== BTS ===
- Love Yourself: Wonder, the music video theme for the group's song "Euphoria"
- Love Yourself: Her, the group's fifth extended play
- Love Yourself: Tear, the group's third Korean studio album and sixth overall
- Love Yourself: Answer, the group's second compilation album
- BTS World Tour: Love Yourself, the group's third worldwide concert tour

=== Others ===
- Love Yourself (album), by Prudence Liew, 2000
- "Love Yourself" (Billy Porter song), 2019
- "Love Yourself" (Mary J. Blige song), 2017
- "Love Yourself (Kimi ga Kirai na Kimi ga Suki)", by Kat-Tun, 2010
- "Love Yourself", a 1996 song by Blueboy
- "Love Yourself", a 1997 song by Karen Mok from To Be
- "Love Yourself", a 2019 song by Sufjan Stevens
- "Love Yourself!", a 2025 song by Hinatazaka46

== See also ==
- Love Myself (disambiguation)
