= Sugarpop =

Filipino child musical group

- Origin: Philippines
- Genres: Pinoy pop; OPM
- Years active: 2006–2010; 2016
- Labels: GMA; Sony BMG
- Past members: Rita Daniela; Julie Anne San Jose; Cholo Bismonte; Enzo Almario; Vanessa Rangadhol

Sugarpop was a Filipino musical group. The group consisted of Rita Daniela, Julie Anne San Jose, Cholo Bismonte, Enzo Almario, and Vanessa Rangadhol. They were formed in 2006 through the reality show Popstar Kids, and appeared as regular performers on the musical variety show SOP.

== History ==
The group, consisting of both boys and girls, were formed by musical director and vocal arranger Danny Tan in 2006 from the former QTV 11 (now GTV) singing contest, Popstar Kids. The members were finalists Julie Anne San Jose, Vanessa Rangadhol, Renzo Almario (now Enzo Almario), and Pocholo "Cholo" Bismonte, with Rita Iringan (now Rita Daniela), the Popstar Kids winner. The group were given the name SugarPop by Jaya. They performed on SOP Rules.

== Disbandment ==
The group was disbanded in 2009 due to the reformatting of SOP Rules, which was replaced by Party Pilipinas. The members (excluding Rangadhol) reunited on February 14, 2016, for a reunion number in Sunday PinaSaya.

== Post-Sugarpop ==
San Jose remained with the defunct SOP Rules and continued to be one of the divas of Party Pilipinas. She was also paired up with Elmo Magalona, and they were dubbed JuliElmo, as one of the prominent love teams of GMA 7. She has not only starred in the variety show but had also appeared in a teen drama together with Magalona, entitled Together Forever, with which they also crossed over onto the silver screen in Just One Summer. Now she already had 3 existing albums under GMA Records and 1 EP under VIM Entertainment. Her first album received a Diamond Record, and her second album received Triple Platinum awarded by Philippine Association of the Record Industry (PARI). She also hosted The Clash alongside Rita.

Iringan (who adopted the screen name Rita Daniela) rejoined her fellow SugarPop mate in Party Pilipinas and has ventured into acting and made several supporting roles both in television and the film before rising to fame with her effective portrayal of Aubrey Palomares in My Special Tatay. Iringan released a self-titled album Rita Daniela in 2015 under GMA Music. She also auditioned for the staging of Miss Saigon in the Philippines when she was 17. However, she was not cast as she was too young for the role. In 2018, she auditioned and was cast in a lead role in Eto Na! Musikal nAPO!. She was also a journey host for The Clash and served as a host for All-Out Sundays.

In late 2011 to early 2013, Rangadhol joined MYMP as its lead vocalist after Juliet Bahala left the group. She went viral with the song "Dota o Ako" alongside Aikee. Ten years later, a sequel to the song, "Dota at Ako", was released in an ad for Netflix's Dota: Dragon's Blood. She is also a content creator with a YouTube channel, Hanky Panky, that features food. On August 19, 2026, Rangadhol's cousin, Ivy, reported her death, via Facebook post, due to an accidental fall.

Almario later competed in the rival network's singing competition shows Tawag ng Tanghalan (where he came out as queer) in 2018 and Idol Philippines the following year. He became a member of a ABS-CBN singing trio iDolls. On September 12, 2024, Almario revealed that Tan sexually abused him during his stint in the group, joining actor Gerald Santos in testifying against the producer.

Bismonte also competed in The Clash as one of the Top 30 contestants where his co-members Rita and Julie hosted the third season in 2020. He has also worked as a park performer in Enchanted Kingdom and Universal Studios Singapore.

== Members ==
- Rita Daniela (2006–2010, 2016)
- Julie Anne San Jose (2006–2010, 2016)
- Cholo Bismonte (2006–2010, 2016)
- Enzo Almario (2006–2010, 2016)
- Vanessa Rangadhol (2006–2010)

== Discography ==
=== Albums ===
Sugarpop

Track #	Song
1	"Sugarpop"
2	"Name Game"
3	"Alam Mo Na... Di Ba?"
4	"Chocolate"
5	"You Lift Me Up"
6	"Walang Laglagan"
7	"Happy Hook"
8	"Written in the Sand"
9	"Paraiso"
10	"Thank You Po"

Sugarpop (Repackaged)

Track #	Song
1	"Sugarpop"
2	"Name Game"
3	"Alam Mo Na... Di Ba?"
4	"Chocolate"
5	"You Lift Me Up"
6	"Walang Laglagan"
7	"Happy Hook"
8	"Written in the Sand"
9	"Paraiso"
10	"Thank You Po"
11	"Sugarpop" (Single Edit)
12	"Aking Mundo" (main theme from Dyesebel)
13	"Siya Na Nga Kaya?" (love theme from Dyesebel)
14	"Mahal Kita" (main theme from MariMar)

== Awards and nominations ==
Year	Award giving body	Category	Nominated work	Results
2008	Awit Awards	Best Dance Recording	"Sugarpop"	Nominated
