= Dota O Ako =

2011 song by Aikee featuring Vanessa

- Cover of the re-recording with Sabrina

Single by Aikee featuring Vanessa

from the album Tayo Ang Bagay
- Released: 2011
- Genre: Contemporary R&B
- Label: MCA Music
- Songwriter: Aikee
- Producer: Francis Guevarra

"Dota O Ako" (lit. 'DotA or Me') is a song by Filipino rapper Aikee, from his collaborative album with Vanessa, Tayo Ang Bagay (2010). Originally entitled "Dota Vs Gf", it was written by Aikee and produced by Francis Guevarra. It was released in 2011 through MCA Music alongside an accompanying music video made by RHTV. Lyrically, the song talks about a girlfriend making her boyfriend choose between her or the video game mod Defense of the Ancients (2003).

A re-recording of the song featuring Sabrina was released in 2013 by UMG Philippines. The re-recording was nominated for Best R&B Recording at the 26th Awit Awards. In 2021, an answer song entitled "Dota at Ako", accompanied by a music video, was recorded by the original singers and was produced by advertising agency Gigil and Netflix Philippines to promote the series Dota: Dragon's Blood.

== Background ==
According to online sports magazine Spin.ph, multiplayer online battle arena video games have held a long presence within the Philippines. Since 2003, the amount of computer shops within the Philippines had initially risen due to the popularity of Defense of the Ancients (DotA, 2003), a multiplayer online battle arena mod for the video game Warcraft III: Reign of Chaos (2002) and its expansion, The Frozen Throne (2003). Its popularity was in both formal and informal contexts, ranging from organized tournaments and games among friends.

Rapper Aikee released a collaborative album with then-Sugarpop member Vanessa entitled Tayo Ang Bagay (2010). (Note: Aikee (October 2, 2010). "grab a copy" – via Facebook.) One of the tracks included in the album was entitled "Dota Vs Gf", which was met with opposition but Aikee insisted for it to be included as the songwriter and self-proclaimed gamer.

== Release, composition, and music video ==
"Dota Vs Gf", later renamed as "Dota O Ako", was released in 2011 through MCA Music (now UMG Philippines) as a single. As both Aikee and Vanessa were managed by RHTV, they appealed to the management for them to help produce a music video for the song. Aikee later stated in a 2021 interview with IGN Southeast Asia that they had no budget at the time and just used a green screen for the video's visuals in order to make it relatable among students as they were also students at the time. In 2013, Aikee re-recorded the song with singer Sabrina as Vanessa had a busy schedule at the time and was under contract with another company.

"Dota O Ako" is three minutes and 54 seconds long. (Note: Re-recording with Sabrina.) It was written by Aikee and produced by Francis Guevarra. Lyrically, the song is about an argument between a girlfriend and a boyfriend, wherein the girlfriend makes her boyfriend choose between her or his gaming addiction to DotA.

== Reception and commercial performance ==
Ash Mahinay of IGN Southeast Asia hailed "Dota O Ako" as the "Best Dota [sic] Song Ever". In another commendation of the song, Mary Graces Tomines of Pop! named it a "playful anthem" and stated that the lyrics and its beat made it "a staple at school events and gatherings." Both Mahinay and Tomines named the song as part of jejemon subculture. In 2013, the re-recording with Sabrina was nominated for Best R&B Recording at the 26th Awit Awards. In 2015, "Dota O Ako" was certified gold in the Philippines by PARI.

== 2021 answer song ==
In 2021, Netflix Philippines and advertising agency Gigil collaborated in creating an answer song entitled "Dota At Ako" sung by the original singers to promote the animated series Dota: Dragon's Blood. Once the project was approved by Netflix Philippines, Aikee wrote the song. In an interview, Vanessa stated that once she received a call to record the song, she cleared her schedule and agreed. The accompanying music video was described by the Philippine Star and Pop! to be done akin to Pinoy videoke. Lyrically, the song talks about the boyfriend's and girlfriend's responses to the argument they had in the previous song, wherein they choose both. A writer for Pop! called the music video "cheesy" but emphasized that the song would "have every DOTA [sic] fan singing along."

== See also ==
- "Vi sitter i Ventrilo och spelar DotA" - song by Basshunter, also about DotA
