= Your Moment =

Philippine reality talent competition show

- Genre: Reality competition; Talent show
- Directed by: Jon Raymond Moll
- Presented by: Luis Manzano; Vhong Navarro
- Judges: Boy Abunda; Billy Crawford; Nadine Lustre
- Country of origin: Philippines
- Original languages: Filipino; English
- No. of episodes: 25

Production
- Production locations: ABS-CBN Soundstage San Jose Del Monte, Bulacan ABS-CBN Studio 10 ABS-CBN Broadcasting Center Sgt. Esguerra Avenue Diliman, Quezon City (Your Final Moment)
- Camera setup: Multiple-camera setup
- Production companies: ABS-CBN Studios; Fritz Productions; Three Thoughts Ahead

Original release
- Network: ABS-CBN
- Release: November 9, 2019 – February 2, 2020

Your Moment is a Philippine television reality competition show broadcast by ABS-CBN. Hosted by Luis Manzano and Vhong Navarro, it aired on the network's Yes Weekend line up from November 9, 2019, to February 2, 2020, replacing the fourth season of The Voice Kids and was replaced by the second season of The Voice Teens.

== Format ==
Billed as the 2-in-1 reality talent competition show, it is known for state-of-the-art innovations such as the revolving immersive set, where the audience and the judges witness their performances from the singing to the dancing stage, and vice versa. The judges also evaluate acts' performances using an emotion meter knob which reflect their scores in real time.

Each performance starts in black-and-white and bursts with lights and color as it progresses, while the judges have to input their scores three times using an emotion meter knob, ranging them from 0% as the lowest to 100% the highest. An emotion meter also appears on-screen reflecting the scores given by the judges every time a performance reaches the three time markers (20, 60, and 90 seconds), which indicate the time they can score.

=== Levels ===
The acts must accomplish four competitive "levels" in order to become one of the grand champions:

- Level 1: Your First Moment

In a single "heat", three acts each (from the singing and dancing categories) must perform within two minutes each to impress the judges.

- Bonus Level: Your Wildcard Moment

Ten returning acts (in which five non-winning acts each from both categories) will perform again. The top singing and dancing act with a highest score gets their last spots.

- Level 2: Your Moment of Choice

The ten highest-ranking acts from both categories will have to pick their opponents in a three-way showdown.

- Level 3: Your Moment of Power

The top performers will choose an "assistant mentor" from local and international entertainment industries. Both second and third levels also follow through "beat the winner" elimination process.

- Level 4: Your Grand Moment

The top three acts per category will compete in a series of rounds that will determine one grand champion in each category and the grand prize per winning act is worth ₱2,000,000 including trophy and ABS-CBN exclusive contract.

== Production ==
ABS-CBN first announced the development of the program in October 2019. It is produced by ABS-CBN Entertainment, in a collaboration with Dutch production companies Fritz Productions and Three Thoughts Ahead. Episode tapings took place at ABS-CBN Soundstage based at Horizon IT Park in San Jose del Monte, Bulacan.

A digital watch-along based "companion show" known as Your Moment Apartment airs together with its main program through Facebook and YouTube. It is co-hosted by Dawn Chang, Sharlene San Pedro, Matty Juniosa, and AC Bonifacio.

== Episodes ==
Color key:
Act name Qualified to the next level	Grand champion	Proceed to level 3
Act name Qualified to the wildcard level	Second place	Proceed to level 4
# Singing category heat	Third place	Eliminated
# Dancing category heat	Proceed to level 2	Act withdrew

=== Level 1: Your First Moment ===
Your First Moment performances
Heat		Singing category		Dancing category	
#	Date	Qualified	Eliminated	Qualified	Eliminated
1 2	November 9, 2019	Lez2Men (89.44); Power of Four (81.11)	Acus3x (74.44)	(India) B Unique Crew (82.77); Ruthless Comrades (87.22)	Kevin and Mark (75.55)
3 4	November 10, 2019	(Indonesia) The Dens Gonjalez (83.89)	Phisix (74.4); Suyo (76.1)	Kenyo Street Fam (86.66); Romeo and Shaine (82.22)	Dance Factory PH (75)
5 6	November 16, 2019	Binary (80); Inside City (77.22)	Soul Divas (66.44)	Diadem (Tied 83.33, Won 95); X&Y (Tied 83.33, Lost 86.66)	Amplified Gen-X (76.44)
7 8	November 17, 2019	Verse Band (81.67)	Crescendo Acoustics (76.11); J-Three (68.33)	Streecacy (85.56)	Freestylers (80); Graffiti (77.22)
9 10	November 23, 2019	Glitters (76.11)	Davao City Chorale (61.67); Nitro (66.11)	EMNT (82.78); Guillermo and Chris (83.89)	(South Korea) Lipstickal Funk (77.78)
11 12	November 24, 2019	Juan Gapang (85); P-Square (83.33)	Charm and Charl (67.22)	(Japan) Fabulous Sisters (87.78)	B2Win (78.33); Boyz Unlimited (78.89)
The November 30, 2019 episode was pre-empted to give way to the 2019 Southeast Asian Games opening ceremony
13 14	December 1, 2019	Bukang Liwayway (80.56)	Japh Dolls (67.22); Teller (66.11)	Unknown Family (80.56)	G!rlz (80); The Latinos (79.4)
15 16	December 7, 2019	First Five Band (75.56)	Biglaan Band (71.11); Sigswank Band (72.22)	Angel Fire (77.77)	Clique V (68.33); It Takes Two (72.77)
17 18	December 7, 2019	Keren and Mark (89.44)	Hoochie Coochie Mickie (73.33); (United States) (United Kingdom) James and Sophie (64.44)	Freakies (81.66); (France) Sadeck and Kanon (82.77)	The Groovers (71.11)
19 20	December 8, 2019	Calixas (76.67); Frequency (75.77); Maka Girls (83.89)	—N/a	NDDU Generals (86.11)	Autonomicas (74.44); Jenesis and Asia (71.67)
21 22	December 8, 2019	Alpuerto Sisters (76.11)	Dhayana; Kim 'n Yow	Vincent and Dhao (79.44)	Real Xtyle; TEV
23 24	December 8, 2019	COVE (79.44)	Boyz Impact; V4 Band	The Glamorous (83.33)	Outcall; Unit E
25 26	December 8, 2019	Zalia (73.88)	Gleetery; Harmonic Jammers	Off Limits (80.56)	Streethoodz; VMA Star5
27 28	December 8, 2019	The Wishfuls (83.33)	M6 Teens; Two Five Zero	NDC (88.88)	Dreamers

=== Bonus Level: Your Wildcard Moment ===
Your Wildcard Moment performances
Heat		Singing category		Dancing category	
#	Date	Qualified	Eliminated	Qualified	Eliminated
29 30	December 14, 2019 December 15, 2019	Inside City (Tied 82.22, Won 93.33)	Calixas (61.67); Frequency (66.11); P-Square (65); Power of Four (Tied 82.22, Lost 86.67)	X&Y (81.67)	(India) B Unique Crew (71.67); EMNT (75.56); Freakies (73.89); Romeo and Shaine (78.89)

=== Level 2: Your Moment of Choice ===
Your Moment of Choice performances
Heat		Singing category		Dancing category	
#	Date	Qualified	Eliminated	Qualified	Eliminated
1 2	December 21, 2019 December 22, 2019	Keren and Mark (77.22)	Alpuerto Sisters (76.11); COVE (73.89)	Angel Fire (80)	NDC (78.33); NDDU Generals (78.33)
3 4	December 28, 2019 December 29, 2019	Verse Band (85)	Binary (82.78); Maka Girls (82.22)	Guillermo and Chris (Replaced 85); Kenyo Street Fam (87.78)	Streecacy (79.44)
5 6	January 4, 2020 January 5, 2020	Juan Gapang (88.33)	Bukang Liwayway (70); First Five Band (75.55)	Ruthless Comrades (87.78)	Unknown Family (83.39); X&Y (78.89)
7 8	January 11, 2020 January 12, 2020	Lez2Men (81.67)	Inside City (80.56); Zalia (78.33)	(Japan) Fabulous Sisters (88.89)	Diadem (80); Vincent and Dhao (81.67)
9 10	January 18, 2020 January 19, 2020	Glitters (76.67)	(Indonesia) The Dens Gonjalez (71.11); The Wishfuls (83.33)	(France) Sadeck and Kanon (82.78) (Note: Act has withdrawn from competition because of scheduling conflicts)	Off Limits (81.67); The Glamorous (80)

=== Level 3: Your Moment of Power ===
Your Moment of Power performances
Heat		Singing category			Dancing category		
#	Date	Act	Mentor	Score	Act	Mentor	Score
1 2	January 25, 2020 January 26, 2020	Juan Gapang	Marcus Davis	96.11	(Japan) Fabulous Sisters	Andy Alviz	93.89
1 2	January 25, 2020 January 26, 2020	Lez2Men	Randy Santiago	91.11	Kenyo Street Fam	Lema Diaz	97.22
1 2	January 25, 2020 January 26, 2020	Verse Band	Nyoy Volante	90.56	Ruthless Comrades	Vimi Rivera	90
1 2	January 25, 2020 January 26, 2020	Glitters	Jona Viray	86.11	Angel Fire	Joane Laygo	Tied 88.89
1 2	January 25, 2020 January 26, 2020	Keren and Mark	Yeng Constantino	86.67	Guillermo and Chris Duo	Dasuri Choi	Tied 88.89

=== Level 4: Your Grand Moment ===
Your Grand Moment performances
Heat		Singing category			Dancing category		
#	Date	Act	Score		Act	Score	
#	Date	Act	1	2	Act	1	2
1 2	February 1, 2020 February 2, 2020	Juan Gapang	96.11	97.22	Kenyo Street Fam	93.33	97.22
1 2	February 1, 2020 February 2, 2020	Verse Band	95	87.22	(Japan) Fabulous Sisters	96.56	96.11
1 2	February 1, 2020 February 2, 2020	Lez2Men	86.67	—N/a	Ruthless Comrades	90.56	—N/a

Scoring breakdowns
Singing category						Dancing category					
Act	Level scores					Act	Level scores				
Act	1	2	3	4	AVG	Act	1	2	3	4	AVG
Juan Gapang	85	88.33	96.11	96.67	91.53	Kenyo Street Fam	86.66	87.78	97.22	95.28	91.74
Verse Band	81.67	85	90.56	91.11	87.1	(Japan) Fabulous Sisters	87.78	88.89	93.89	96.33	91.72
Lez2Men	89.44	81.67	91.11	86.67	87.22	Ruthless Comrades	87.22	87.78	90	90.56	88.89

== Reception ==
=== Television ratings ===
Color key:
Highest rated episode
Lowest rated episode

Your Moment ratings
No.	Title	Airing date	Timeslot (PST)	Rating (Cons.)	Rank TS	Rank EV	Rank OVA	Source
1	"Your First Moment, Heats 1—2"	November 9, 2019	Saturday, 7:30 pm	28.9%	1	1	1	
2	"Your First Moment, Heats 3—4"	November 10, 2019	Sunday, 7:45 pm	26.3%	1	3	3	
3	"Your First Moment, Heats 5—6"	November 16, 2019	Saturday, 7:30 pm	25.8%	1	1	1	
4	"Your First Moment, Heats 7—8"	November 17, 2019	Sunday, 7:45 pm	22.5%	1	4	4	
5	"Your First Moment, Heats 9—10"	November 23, 2019	Saturday, 7:30 pm	22.6%	1	1	1	
6	"Your First Moment, Heats 11—12"	November 24, 2019	Sunday, 7:45 pm	22.9%	1	3	3	
7	"Your First Moment, Heats 13—14"	December 1, 2019	Sunday, 7:45 pm	20.8%	1	4	4	
8	"Your First Moment, Heats 15—18"	December 7, 2019	Saturday, 7:30 pm	18.8%	1	1	1	
9	"Your First Moment, Heats 19—28"	December 8, 2019	Sunday, 7:00 pm	19.4%	1	4	4	
10	"Your Wildcard Moment, part 1"	December 14, 2019	Saturday, 7:30 pm	19.5%	1	1	1	
11	"Your Wildcard Moment, part 2"	December 15, 2019	Sunday, 7:00 pm	20.2%	1	2	2	
12	"Your Moment of Choice, part 1"	December 21, 2019	Saturday, 7:30 pm	19.6%	1	2	2	
13	"Your Moment of Choice, part 2"	December 22, 2019	Sunday, 7:00 pm	19.2%	1	2	2	
14	"Your Moment of Choice, part 3"	December 28, 2019	Saturday, 7:30 pm	18.3%	1	1	1	
15	"Your Moment of Choice, part 4"	December 29, 2019	Sunday, 7:00 pm	18%	1	2	2	
16	"Your Moment of Choice, part 5"	January 4, 2020	Saturday, 7:30 pm	20.4%	1	1	1	
17	"Your Moment of Choice, part 6"	January 5, 2020	Sunday, 7:00 pm	21.8%	1	1	2	
18	"Your Moment of Choice, part 7"	January 11, 2020	Saturday, 7:30 pm	22.3%	1	2	2	
19	"Your Moment of Choice, part 8"	January 12, 2020	Sunday, 7:00 pm	19.2%	1	4	4	
20	"Your Moment of Choice, part 9"	January 18, 2020	Saturday, 7:30 pm	21.9%	1	1	1	
21	"Your Moment of Choice, part 10"	January 19, 2020	Sunday, 7:00 pm	18.4%	1	2	4	
22	"Your Moment of Power, part 1"	January 25, 2020	Saturday, 7:30 pm	21.8%	1	1	1	
23	"Your Moment of Power, part 2"	January 26, 2020	Sunday, 7:00 pm	19.8%	1	2	4	
24	"Your Grand Moment, part 1"	February 1, 2020	Saturday, 7:30 pm	22%	1	1	1	
25	"Your Grand Moment, part 2"	February 2, 2020	Sunday, 7:00 pm	25.5%	1	2	2	

Source: Kantar Media Philippines

== See also ==
- List of programs broadcast by ABS-CBN
