= 1MX =

Asian music festival series

- Location: Various cities
- Years active: 2017-present
- Organiser: ABS-CBN Global
- Website: www.1musicx.com

One Music X Festival, commonly abbreviated to "1MX", is an Asian music festival series held in various international cities. Organized by ABS-CBN Global, it incorporates live music featuring artists from the Philippines and various international artists of Asian ancestry.

== History ==
1MX held its first two editions of the festival in the United Arab Emirates, with the inaugural event held in Dubai on November 3, 2017. The festival later moved to Abu Dhabi for its second edition held on November 9, 2018. In 2019, it held its first festival outside of the UAE on May 26 in Singapore, followed by a second festival hosted in the Philippines on November 22 in Quezon City.

In 2021, 1MX held its first back-to-back festivals with a live concert in Dubai and a virtual concert in Manila, Philippines, both held on December 3. The in-person festival in Dubai marked the festival's return to the UAE after a two-year break. Both festivals were streamed live through the online streaming platform KTX.ph, while the Manila festival was broadcast on television in the Philippines on a delayed basis on A2Z, where it was split into two parts broadcast on January 8 and 9, 2022.

In 2022, the festival held its first event in Europe, hosted in the United Kingdom at Walton-on-Thames, Surrey on July 30.

In 2023, 1MX held three festivals in three continents, with the first 2023 festival returning to the UK on July 8 in London. It also held its first festivals in North America and Oceania, with the second 2023 festival hosted in Toronto, Canada on September 10 and the third 2023 festival hosted in Sydney, Australia on October 8.

== Editions ==
Dates, locations, hosts and performers of 1MX
Year	Date	Host city and country	Venue	Host(s)	Featured artists	Ref.
2017	November 3	Dubai, United Arab Emirates	Dubai Media City Amphitheatre	DJ Chacha, Ai Dela Cruz and Robi Domingo	Rico Blanco; Yeng Constantino; Emmanuel Marie; Josh McCartney; DJ Moophs; Silent Sanctuary; KZ Tandingan; Xela	
2018	November 9	Abu Dhabi, United Arab Emirates	Mubadala Arena	DJ Chacha and DJ Onse	Aegis; Moira Dela Torre; Iñigo Pascual; Maris Racal; KZ Tandingan	
2019	May 26	Singapore	*SCAPE Playspace	Robi Domingo	Jayda Avanzado; Ben&Ben; Bugoy Drilon; Darren Espanto; Eva Ronda; KZ Tandingan	
2019	November 22	Quezon City, Philippines (Note: Labeled as Manila in promotional material.)	Centris Elements	none	Agsunta; Yeng Constantino; Darren Espanto; The Itchyworms; IV of Spades; Mayonnaise; Sandwich; KZ Tandingan	
2021	December 3	Dubai, United Arab Emirates	Dubai World Trade Centre Arena	none	BGYO; Bini; Ez Mil; Gigi de Lana; Moira Dela Torre; Bamboo Mañalac	
2021	December 3	Manila, Philippines	Virtual concert	Edward Barber and AC Bonifacio	Carlo Bautista; AC Bonifacio; Trisha Denise; Fana; Jayda; Jeremy G; Angela Ken; Kritiko; Lian Kyla; Nameless Kids; Sab	
2022	July 30	Walton-on-Thames, United Kingdom (Note: Labeled as London in promotional material.)	Apps Court Farm	none	Darren Espanto; Ez Mil; Jon Guelas; Jeremy G; Angela Ken; Bamboo Mañalac; Sab; KZ Tandingan	
2023	July 8	London, United Kingdom	Silverworks Island	none	Ben&Ben; Janine Berdin; Moira Dela Torre; Maymay Entrata; Johnny Orlando; Clara Rosa; Tinyumbrellas; Yuna	
2023	September 10	Toronto, Canada	Budweiser Stage	none	Ben&Ben; BGYO; Dabin; Guapdad 4000; DJ Hedspin; DJ Jayemkayem; Justin Park; Russell!; Thủy; DJ Tilt; Umi	
2023	October 8	Sydney, Australia	Hordern Pavilion	none	Ben&Ben; Bini; Maymay Entrata; Dami Im; Milky Day; William Singe; KZ Tandingan; Keenan Te	

== See also ==
- One Music PH
- Myx
