= Love Myself =

Love Myself may refer to:

- Love Myself (campaign), an anti-violence campaign launched by BTS and UNICEF
- "Love Myself" (Hailee Steinfeld song), 2015
- "Love Myself" (Tracee Ellis Ross song), 2020
- "Love Myself", a 2021 song by Andy Grammer
- "Love Myself", a 2017 song by Qveen Herby
- "Love Myself", a 2019 song by Olivia O'Brien
- "Love Myself", a 2024 song by Cameron Whitcomb
- Love Myself, a 2024 extended play by Lindsay Ell

== See also ==
- "In Love with Myself", a 2005 song by David Guetta featuring JD Davis
- Love Yourself (disambiguation)
