= Ma'am Chief: Shakedown in Seoul =

2023 Philippine comedy film

- Theatrical release poster
- Directed by: Kring Kim
- Written by: Sofia Hazel Calayag
- Story by: Happee Sy-Go
- Produced by: Vernon Go; Dan Kim
- Starring: Melai Cantiveros
- Edited by: Charliebebs Gohetia
- Music by: Dominic Benedicto
- Production company: PULP Studios
- Release date: November 15, 2023
- Countries: Philippines; South Korea
- Language: Filipino

Ma'am Chief: Shakedown in Seoul is a 2023 action-comedy film produced by PULP Studios. Directed by Kring Kim, the film stars Melai Cantiveros in the titular role. It was released on November 15, 2023.

== Cast ==
- Melai Cantiveros as Police Exec. Msgt. Criselda Kaptan
- Karylle as Police Exec. Msgt. Olga Tentativa
- Alora Sasam as Yas Cordero
- Jennica Garcia as Police Chief Msgt. Joy Salazar
- Bernadette Allyson as Gretch Villa
- Enzo Almario as Polly Penano
- Sela Guia as Jenny Mendoza
- Marinella Sevidal as Ella Mae Suarez
- Dustine Mayores as Prince Dizon
- Louella Gomez as Marnee Kaptan
- Al Tantay as Police Maj. Gen. Roy Ferrer
- Pepe Herrera as Abraham Apostol
- Moon Kyung as Kim Bora
- Gabriel Choi as Lee Dong-han
- Lee Seung-gi
- Do Ji-han
- Yuju of GFriend
- Rolling Quartz
- Ha Ju-young
- Park Seong-jin
- Hyeonyul Kim
- Kim Hyeon-yul
- Suya Lee
- Park Ji-yong
- Bible Wichapas Sumettikul as Thai Police (Cameo)
- Ta Nannakun Pakapatpornpob as Thai Police (Cameo)

== Production ==
Production of the film took place both in Manila, Philippines and South Korea.

== Marketing ==
The official trailer of the film was released on October 22, 2023.

== Awards and nominations ==
Name of the award ceremony, year presented, category, nominee of the award, and the result of the nomination
| Award ceremony | Year | Category | Nominee / Work | Result | Ref. |
|---|---|---|---|---|---|
| Asia Artist Awards | 2023 | Best Actor Award | Melai Cantiveros | Won | |
