= Gigi de Lana =

Filipino singer (born 1995)

Gigi De Lana
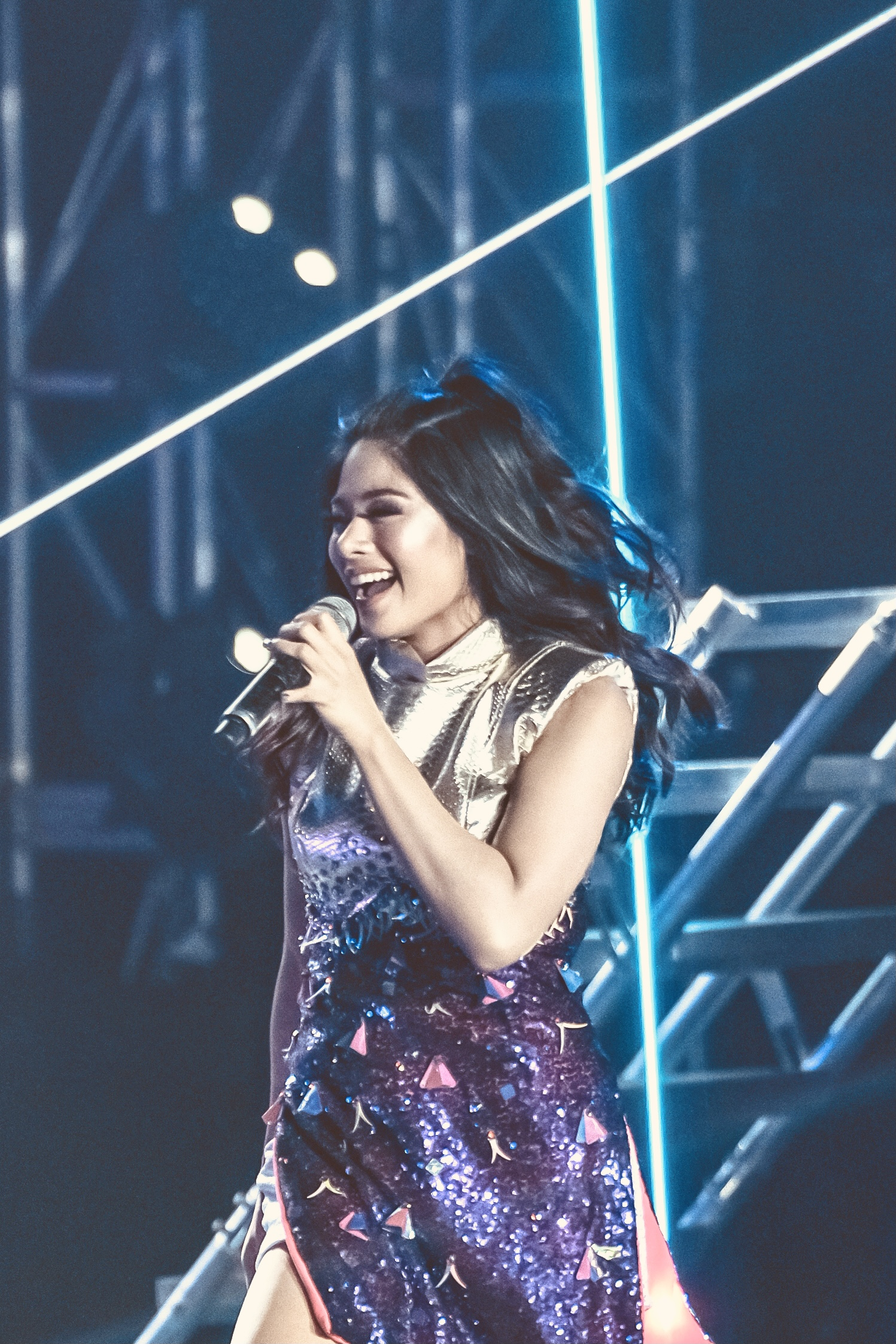
- De Lana in 2019
- Born: Mary Gidget Orfano dela Llana; September 24, 1995 (age 31); Olongapo, Philippines
- Education: Colegio de San Juan de Letran
- Occupations: Singer; actress
- Years active: 2007–present
- Musical career
- Genre: Pop
- Years active: 2021–present
- Label: Star Music
- Website: Gigi de Lana on Instagram

Mary Gidget Orfano dela Llana (born September 24, 1995), known professionally as Gigi de Lana, is a Filipina singer and actress. She rose to fame when she competed on Tawag ng Tanghalan on It's Showtime. She is currently under the management of Rise Artists Studio and Star Magic. De Lana made her film debut in Four Sisters Before the Wedding (2020) as Love Mae.

== Early life and education ==
De Lana was born on September 24, 1995, in Olongapo. She and her mother, Imelda moved to Laguna at an early age. She studied at Calamba Doctors' College, and at Colegio de San Juan de Letran.

== Career ==
=== Pop Star Kids, SOP, and Eat Bulaga ===
De Lana joined the reality talent competition Pop Star Kids, finishing as a grand finalist on its 2nd season. De Lana would later appear on several shows, including SOP, where she performed regularly as a member of Sugarpop, a group consisting of prominent Popstar Kids contestants until it disbanded in 2009.

A few years later, she joined Eat Bulaga!'s Ikaw at Echo: Ka-Voice ni Idol, an impression contest for singers. De Lana placed as a grand finalist. She impersonated singer and actress Jennifer Hudson.

=== Rise Artists Studio ===
A few weeks after revealing De Lana would be joining the cast of Four Sisters Before the Wedding, a prequel to the 2013 movie Four Sisters and a Wedding, Rise Artists Studio, an artist management division of Star Magic, announced that it was welcoming De Lana as a new member. On a special edition of 'We Rise Together', on December 2, 2020, De Lana was welcomed by other members of Rise.

In a press conference, De Lana was asked about how she was discovered by Rise. She replied,

I was discovered by Rise through Ma'am Charo, she was the one who discovered me. She saw one of my videos where I sang 'We've Only Just Begun', where I was in a green dress. I wasn't expecting to be added [as a member of Rise]. Then, that was it. After that, Ma'am JD called, Sir Mico called, so that was how it started

When she was asked about using a screen name in place of her real name, she said,

Yes, the management [decided on the name change]. But, the agreement was with both sides, so we decided to change the name.

Since joining Rise, De Lana has taken part in some episodes of WRT as a co-host.

== Discography ==
=== Studio albums ===
Year	Album	Record Label
2022	Gigi De Lana	Star Music

=== Singles ===
Year	Song title	Composer	Record Label
2021	Sakalam	Erwin Lacsa and Romeo Marquez	Star Music

=== Official Soundtrack ===
Year	Song	Film/Show
2021	Nasa'yo Ako	Viral Scandal
2021	Bakit Nga Ba Mahal Kita	Hello, Heart
2022	Sa Dulo	The Broken Marriage Vow
2022	Akin Ka Na Lang	A Family Affair

== Filmography ==
=== Film ===
Year	Title	Role	Notes
2020	Four Sisters Before the Wedding	Love Mae Tete	

=== Television/Digital ===
Year	Title	Role	Notes	Ref(s)
2011; 2025	Eat Bulaga!	Herself	Contestant/Guest Performer	
2022	My Crush Is A Cactus Killer	Mandy	Three-part series	
2021	Hello, Heart	Heart	Main role	
2022	I Can See Your Voice	Herself	Guest Artist (season 4)	
2025	It's Showtime	Herself	Guest Performer	
2026	Vibe+	Herself	Performer	

== Awards and nominations ==
Award	Year	Category	Recipient(s) and nominee(s)	Result	Ref(s)
Wish 107.5 Music Awards	2022	Bronze Wishclusive Elite Circle	"Pangarap Ko Ang Ibigin Ka"	Won	
Aliw Awards	2023	Best Female Pop Artist	Gigi de Lana	Won	
