= Matty Juniosa =

Filipino singer and musical theatre actor

- Born: July 13, 1998 (age 28); Mandaluyong, Metro Manila, Philippines
- Education: DLSU-Manila (BA International Studies); Royal Conservatoire of Scotland (BFA Musical Theatre)
- Occupations: Singer; musical theatre actor
- Years active: 2019–present
- Musical career
- Genres: OPM; pop; soul; R&B; Musical theatre
- Instrument: Vocals
- Label: StarPop (ABS-CBN Music)

Matty Juniosa (born July 13, 1998) is a Filipino singer and musical theatre actor. He first rose to prominence as a Top 12 finalist on the inaugural season of Idol Philippines in 2019. Following the competition, he became a member of the all-male vocal trio iDolls alongside fellow contestants Lucas Garcia and Enzo Almario, which was active from 2019 to 2022.

In 2022, Juniosa relocated to Glasgow, Scotland, to pursue a BFA in Musical Theatre at the Royal Conservatoire of Scotland on a partial scholarship. He has since built a career in theatre, performing in productions at the Edinburgh Festival Fringe and on the West End. In 2026, he gained international recognition after receiving the Golden Buzzer from Simon Cowell on Series 19 of Britain's Got Talent for his rendition of Prince's "Purple Rain", ultimately finishing in fourth place in the competition. He subsequently joined the cast of Jesus Christ Superstar at The London Palladium, playing the role of Annas.

== Early life and education ==
Juniosa was born on July 13, 1998, and grew up in Mandaluyong City, Metro Manila, Philippines. He developed a passion for music and singing at an early age. He graduated from De La Salle University–Manila with a degree in International Studies, majoring in American Studies. He also trained in musical theatre under the PETA and ATEG.

In 2022, Juniosa relocated to Glasgow, Scotland, after receiving a partial scholarship to study Musical Theatre at the Royal Conservatoire of Scotland. While studying, he worked part-time as a waiter in Glasgow.

== Career ==
=== 2019: Idol Philippines ===
In 2019, Juniosa competed in the first season of Idol Philippines on ABS-CBN, where he advanced to the Top 12 before being eliminated.

=== 2019–2022: iDolls ===
After the conclusion of Idol Philippines, Juniosa was grouped with fellow contestants Lucas Garcia (the season's runner-up) and Enzo Almario (a Top 20 finalist) by ABS-CBN to form the all-male vocal trio iDolls. The group released several singles under StarPop and became regular performers on ASAP Natin 'To. In 2021, the iDolls competed as a group in the third season of Your Face Sounds Familiar on ABS-CBN, where they finished in fourth place.

The iDolls also recorded the song "Hinog Na Ang Mundo," which served as the original soundtrack for the BL series Love Beneath the Stars. Their song "Kapangyarihan" was featured as the finale lip-sync song in the second season of Drag Race Philippines (2023), and was also included in the soundtrack of Drag You & Me, a 2023 iWantTFC digital series.

The iDolls disbanded in September 2022, prompted by Juniosa's decision to relocate to the United Kingdom to pursue his studies.

=== 2022–2025: Theatre career ===
After moving to Glasgow, Juniosa built a career in musical theatre while completing his studies at the Royal Conservatoire of Scotland. In 2024, he performed at the Edinburgh Festival Fringe, portraying Lola in Kinky Boots and Clopin in The Hunchback of Notre Dame. He also appeared in the Royal Conservatoire of Scotland's 2024 production of She Loves Me.

In 2025, Juniosa portrayed Mitch Mahoney in The 25th Annual Putnam County Spelling Bee, Hanschen Rillow in Spring Awakening, and Sonja in Oscar at the Crown, which was his professional theatre debut. In January 2026, he played Muzha in the musical Ne Zha.

=== 2026: Britain's Got Talent ===
In March 2026, Juniosa auditioned for Series 19 of Britain's Got Talent with a rendition of Prince's "Purple Rain". His performance earned a standing ovation from the audience and all four judges — Simon Cowell, Amanda Holden, Alesha Dixon, and KSI — and Cowell pressed his Golden Buzzer, sending Juniosa directly to the semi-finals. KSI remarked that Juniosa "became a superstar" the moment he took the microphone, while Cowell described it as the biggest audience reaction of the series. The audition clip garnered over 3.6 million views on YouTube within two days.

In the semi-finals, Juniosa performed Aerosmith's "Dream On" accompanied by a gospel choir, which earned him a second Golden Buzzer from Amanda Holden, sending him directly to the grand final.

In the grand final on May 30, 2026, he performed Sinéad O'Connor's "Nothing Compares 2 U" on a specially designed M-shaped stage, accompanied by a gospel choir, and received a standing ovation from all four judges. Alesha Dixon remarked, "You finished it off in style. First-class vocal. It's as good as it gets." Amanda Holden called it "perfection," while Cowell said, "I think we've all fallen in love with you from the minute we first met you." Juniosa finished in fourth place with 9.16% of the public vote, just 0.12 percentage points behind third-place finishers Anastasiia and Salsa. The Hawkstone Farmers Choir won the competition with 28.72% of the vote. Juniosa was the highest-placing solo singer of the season.

=== 2026: West End theatre ===
Following Britain's Got Talent, Juniosa was cast as Annas in the West End production of Jesus Christ Superstar at The London Palladium, alongside Sam Ryder as Jesus and Tyrone Huntley as Judas. The production, directed by Timothy Sheader, was scheduled to run from June 20 to September 5, 2026.

On April 12, 2026, Juniosa attended the Olivier Awards 2026 at the Royal Albert Hall in London, wearing a traditional Filipino barong tagalog.

== Personal life ==
Juniosa is openly gay. He currently resides in Glasgow, Scotland. After finishing fourth on Britain's Got Talent, he joked on Instagram: "Me knowing I placed 4th on BGT, which is Beyoncé's birthday, and I'm very proud of that."

== Performances on Britain's Got Talent ==
Stage	Song	Original artist	Result
Audition	"Purple Rain"	Prince	Golden Buzzer (Simon Cowell)
Semi-final	"Dream On"	Aerosmith	Golden Buzzer (Amanda Holden)
Final	"Nothing Compares 2 U"	Sinéad O'Connor	4th place (9.16%)

== Stage credits ==
Year	Production	Role	Venue/Festival
2024	She Loves Me	Ensemble	Royal Conservatoire of Scotland
2024	Kinky Boots	Lola	Edinburgh Festival Fringe
2024	The Hunchback of Notre Dame	Clopin	Edinburgh Festival Fringe
2025	The 25th Annual Putnam County Spelling Bee	Mitch Mahoney	
2025	Spring Awakening	Hanschen Rillow	
2025	Oscar at the Crown	Sonja	Professional theatre debut
2026	Ne Zha	Muzha	
2026	Jesus Christ Superstar	Annas	The London Palladium (West End)

== Television ==
Year	Title	Role	Network	Notes
2019	Idol Philippines	Himself (contestant)	ABS-CBN	Top 12
2020	Your Moment	Himself (online host)	ABS-CBN	Online host
2020–2022	ASAP Natin 'To	Himself (as part of iDolls)	ABS-CBN	Regular performer
2021	Your Face Sounds Familiar (Season 3)	Himself (contestant, as part of iDolls)	ABS-CBN	4th place
2022	Idol Philippines (Season 2)	Himself (online host)	ABS-CBN	Online host
2022	Run to Me	Kimba	ABS-CBN	Mini series
2026	Britain's Got Talent (Series 19)	Himself (contestant)	ITV	4th place; two Golden Buzzers

== Discography ==
=== Soundtrack appearances (as part of iDolls) ===
Year	Title	Used in
2021	"Hinog Na Ang Mundo"	Love Beneath the Stars (original soundtrack)
2021	"Kapangyarihan"	Drag Race Philippines Season 2 (2023, finale lip-sync song); Drag You & Me (iWantTFC, 2023)

== Events ==
Date	Event	Venue	Notes
April 12, 2026	Olivier Awards 2026	Royal Albert Hall, London	Attended wearing barong tagalog
