= Enzo Almario =

Filipino singer and actor (born 1995)

- Almario at PridePH LoveLaban 2026 at the University of the Philippines Diliman, Quezon City
- Born: Renzo Almario; December 2, 1995 (age 30); Sucat, Muntinlupa, Metro Manila, Philippines
- Education: De La Salle University–Dasmariñas; Colegio de San Juan de Letran Calamba (AB Communication)
- Occupations: Singer; actor
- Years active: 2006–present
- Musical career
- Genres: OPM; pop
- Instrument: Vocals
- Label: StarPop (ABS-CBN Music)

Enzo Almario (born Renzo Almario on December 2, 1995) is a Filipino singer and actor whose personal mantra is "to inspire people through wisdom or voice." He first gained recognition as a child performer on the QTV-11 reality singing competition Popstar Kids in 2006, becoming a finalist and subsequently a member of the children's singing group Sugarpop. He also portrayed Young Henry Sy, Sr. in the musical I Dream: A Musicale on the Life of Henry Sy, Sr. for SM's 50th anniversary in 2008. That same year, he held his first solo concert, Moods, a fundraising event at St. Joseph Parish Church in Carmona, Cavite. He later rose to wider prominence through appearances on It's Showtime's Tawag ng Tanghalan segment in 2018 and as a semi-finalist on the first season of Idol Philippines in 2019. He was a member of the all-male vocal trio iDolls from 2019 to 2022.

== Early life and education ==
Almario was born on December 2, 1995, in Sucat, Muntinlupa, Metro Manila, and was raised in Santa Rosa, Laguna. His parents discovered his talent for singing at a young age, and he began training under various vocal coaches. He started participating in singing competitions at the age of eight.

In 2012, Almario enrolled at De La Salle University–Dasmariñas to study BSBA Marketing and Advertising Management. He later transferred to Colegio de San Juan de Letran Calamba, where he graduated in 2018 with a degree in AB Communication.

== Career ==
=== 2006–2009: Popstar Kids and Sugarpop ===
In 2006, Almario (then known as Renzo Almario) joined the QTV-11 reality singing competition Popstar Kids, hosted by Kyla. He finished as part of the Top 5 finalists alongside Julie Anne San Jose, Rita Iringan (Rita Daniela), Pocholo "Cholo" Bismonte, and Vanessa Rangadhol. Following the competition, the five finalists were formed into a children's singing group called Sugarpop, named by singer Jaya and managed by musical director Danny Tan.

Sugarpop became regular performers on GMA Network's musical variety show SOP Rules and released two studio albums. The group also hosted a show on QTV-11 titled Planet Q. In 2008, Almario portrayed Young Henry Sy, Sr. in the stage musical I Dream: A Musicale on the Life of Henry Sy, Sr., produced for SM's 50th anniversary celebration. Also in 2008, at just 12 years old, he held his first solo concert, Moods, a fundraising event for St. Joseph Parish Church in Poblacion, Carmona, Cavite (Diocese of Imus), marking an early milestone in his career. During this period, Almario also appeared in the QTV-11 comedy series Ay! Robot! alongside Ogie Alcasid, Sam Bumatay, and Eunice "Charming" Lagunsad.

Sugarpop was disbanded in 2009 following the reformatting of SOP Rules, which was replaced by Party Pilipinas.

=== 2018–2019: Tawag ng Tanghalan and Idol Philippines ===
After a period away from the spotlight, Almario returned to television in 2018 when he joined the Tawag ng Tanghalan segment of It's Showtime on ABS-CBN, where he won as a Daily Winner. During his appearance on the show on November 6, 2018, he publicly came out as genderqueer, accompanied by his boyfriend Ceejay and his father Roman Almario. In an interview with Vice Ganda and Mariel Rodriguez, he shared that he had been a member of Sugarpop since the age of nine.

In 2019, Almario competed in the first season of Idol Philippines on ABS-CBN. He reached the Top 20 of the competition before being eliminated in the semi-finals.

=== 2019–2022: iDolls ===
After the conclusion of Idol Philippines, Almario was grouped with fellow contestants Lucas Garcia (the season's runner-up) and Matty Juniosa (a Top 12 finalist) by ABS-CBN to form the all-male vocal trio iDolls. The group's name was a portmanteau of "Idol," referencing their shared origin from Idol Philippines, and "Dolls," a playful nod to the members' identities as openly gay performers. The trio first performed together on September 1, 2019, as guest performers at Vice Ganda's Ang Fantastic Concert ng Vaklang Twooh! tour at the USEP Gymnasium in Davao City, even before the group had been formally named — a date the members would later acknowledge as the start of iDolls. The group released several singles under StarPop, including covers of popular OPM songs such as "Dalaga," "Hanggang Dito na Lang," and "Mabagal."

In 2021, the iDolls competed as a group in the third season of Your Face Sounds Familiar on ABS-CBN, where they were billed as the "Idol Trio" and finished in fourth place. Following the competition, the three members officially signed contracts with Star Magic, ABS-CBN's talent management arm. The group also recorded the song "Hinog Na Ang Mundo," which served as the soundtrack for the BL series Love Beneath the Stars. Their song "Kapangyarihan" was featured as the finale lip-sync song performed by Captivating Katkat and Arizona Brandy in the second season of Drag Race Philippines, and was also included in the soundtrack of Drag You & Me, a 2023 iWantTFC digital series. Almario described the song as "a love letter to the trans community" in an interview with GMA Integrated News.

The iDolls disbanded in September 2022 after three years together.

=== 2022–present: Solo career ===
Following the disbandment of iDolls, Almario pursued a solo career in both music and acting. He starred in the LGBTQ+ romantic drama mini-series Sleep with Me (2022) and the YouTube web series Love Bites Season 2: Boy Meets Man as Japs, alongside Jay Gonzaga, with whom he discussed themes of love and courtship in interviews with ABS-CBN. He also appeared in the action comedy film Ma'am Chief: Shakedown in Seoul (2023), a Philippine-Korean co-production in which he played the role of Polly Penano alongside Melai Cantiveros.

In 2025, Almario released his debut EP titled Gunita under StarPop, which features his renditions of several OPM love anthems including "Hanggang Kailan," "Dito Na Lang," "Mas Mabuti Pa," "Gisingin Ang Puso," "Kakayanin Kaya," and "Hanggang Dito Na Lang." The EP peaked at number 4 on the Philippines iTunes Top Albums chart in August 2025, behind the KPop Demon Hunters soundtrack, AHOF's Who We Are, and Taylor Swift's Reputation. The lead track "Hanggang Kailan," originally sung by Michael Pangilinan, was produced and co-written by StarPop label head Roque "Rox" Santos with Cynthia Roque. He also returned to compete on Tawag ng Tanghalan: All-Star Grand Resbak Season 2.

In August 2025, Almario renewed his recording contract with StarPop, the music label of ABS-CBN Music, as one of nine new-generation artists signed to the label.

== Advocacy ==
Almario is an advocate for LGBTQ+ rights and has spoken publicly about his experiences with discrimination based on his sexual orientation. In a 2021 interview with LionhearTV, he called out people who ask intrusive questions about same-sex relationships, saying it was "none of anybody's business."

In September 2024, he publicly disclosed that he was a survivor of sexual abuse, revealing through a YouTube video with singer Gerald Santos that he was assaulted at the age of 12 in 2008 by musical director Danny Tan, who had managed Sugarpop. Almario further revealed that two other minors were present during the abuse. His disclosure was part of a broader movement of Filipino male celebrities speaking out against sexual abuse in the entertainment industry, which was described by media as a local #MeToo movement.

In January 2025, Almario joined Gerald Santos and Sandro Muhlach in launching the "Courage Movement," an advocacy group for survivors of sexual abuse in the entertainment industry. He appeared at Santos's benefit concert Courage at SM North EDSA Skydome in January 2025, an event that was attended by supporters including Senator Risa Hontiveros.

In August 2025, Almario spoke about finding purpose after surviving the abuse, and has since become an advocate for sexual abuse survivors. He has expressed support for Promoting Awareness and Victors Empowerment (PAVE) Philippines, an organization led by Phoebe Fructuoso, who personally reached out to Almario during the time he first shared about the abuse. Almario, alongside Gerald Santos, Sandro Muhlach, and Kat Alano, was featured in an episode of PAVE Philippines' Real People, Real Stories series, where they shared their experiences of abuse and advocated for justice.

== Personal life ==
Almario is in a relationship with photographer Ceejay Serrano. The couple has been featured in GMA Entertainment's lists of inspiring celebrity LGBTQ+ couples. In 2019, the couple appeared at the Love Gala 2019, an HIV/AIDS awareness benefit event headlined by Pia Wurtzbach and organized by LoveYourself Inc. In a 2021 interview, he spoke about the importance of not letting others define one's identity and called out intrusive questions directed at same-sex couples.

On June 27, 2026, Almario performed at the LoveLaban Pride PH Festival 2026, held at the University of the Philippines Diliman in Quezon City for LGBTQIA+ Pride Month. The event, organized by the Quezon City government, Pride PH Coalition, and UP Diliman, drew approximately 300,000 attendees and was described as the largest Pride gathering in Southeast Asia.

On August 19, 2026, Almario's former Sugarpop groupmate Vanessa Rangadhol died at the age of 30 following an accidental fall. Almario joined fellow Sugarpop members Julie Anne San Jose, Rita Daniela, and Cholo Bismonte at Rangadhol's wake on August 30, 2026.

== Discography ==
=== Extended plays ===
Year	Title	Label	Peak chart position
2025	Gunita	StarPop	#4 (iTunes Philippines)

=== Albums (as part of Sugarpop) ===
Year	Title	Label	Notes
2007	Sugarpop	Sony BMG	10 tracks; includes "Sugarpop," "You Lift Me Up," "Walang Laglagan," "Written in the Sand," "Thank You Po," and "Alam Mo Na 'Di Ba?"
2008	Sugarpop (repackaged edition)	Sony BMG	14 tracks; expanded edition

=== Singles ===
Year	Title	Notes
2020	"Extensyon"	Solo single under StarPop
2025	"Hanggang Kailan"	Lead single from Gunita
2026	"Hanggang"	Featured on CAT Records Reimagined: A Teddy Katigbak Production, Vol. 1

=== Soundtrack appearances (as part of Sugarpop) ===
Year	Title	Used in
2007	"Mahal Kita"	Marimar
2008	"Aking Mundo"	Dyesebel

=== Soundtrack appearances (as part of iDolls) ===
Year	Title	Used in
2021	"Hinog Na Ang Mundo"	Love Beneath the Stars (original soundtrack)
2021	"Kapangyarihan"	Drag Race Philippines Season 2 (2023, finale lip-sync song); Drag You & Me (iWantTFC, 2023)

== Filmography ==
=== Television ===
Year	Title	Role	Network	Notes
2006	Popstar Kids	Himself (contestant)	QTV-11	Grand finalist
2006–2007	Ay! Robot!	Himself	QTV-11	With Ogie Alcasid, Sam Bumatay, Eunice "Charming" Lagunsad
2007–2008	Planet Q	Himself (host, as part of Sugarpop)	QTV-11	
2007–2009	SOP Rules	Himself (as part of Sugarpop)	GMA Network	Regular performer
2010	SOP	Himself (as part of Sugarpop)	GMA Network	Guest; final episode
2010	Ina, Kasusuklaman Ba Kita?	Cameo role	GMA Network	
2016	Sunday PinaSaya	Himself (as part of Sugarpop)	GMA Network	Guest
2018	Tawag ng Tanghalan	Himself	ABS-CBN	Daily Winner
2019	Idol Philippines	Himself (contestant)	ABS-CBN	Top 20; semi-finalist
2019	Gandang Gabi, Vice!	Himself (guest, as part of iDolls)	ABS-CBN	Guest
2020–2022	ASAP Natin 'To	Himself (as part of iDolls)	ABS-CBN	Regular performer
2021	Your Face Sounds Familiar (Season 3)	Himself (contestant, as part of iDolls)	ABS-CBN	4th place
2022	Idol Philippines (Season 2)	Himself (online host)	ABS-CBN	Online host
2022	I Can See Your Voice (Season 4)	Himself (guest artist, as part of iDolls)	ABS-CBN	Episode aired February 27, 2022
2022–2023	ASAP Natin 'To	Himself	ABS-CBN	Regular performer
2023	Sang Daang PIEnalo	Himself (host)	PIE Channel	PIE Jock
2023	Sinong Manok Mo	Himself (host)	PIE Channel	PIE Jock
2025	Tawag ng Tanghalan: All-Star Grand Resbak (Season 2)	Himself (contestant)	ABS-CBN	Pangkat Alon

=== Television series ===
Year	Title	Role	Network	Platform	Notes
2022	Sleep with Me	Whammy	ABS-CBN	iWant, Netflix	GL series

=== Web series ===
Year	Title	Role	Platform	Notes
2019	BluedTube (Season 2)	Himself (featured)	YouTube	8 episodes (June 28 – August 16, 2019); produced by Blued (now HeeSay)
2022	Love Bites Season 2: Boy Meets Man	Japs	YouTube	Web series

=== Film ===
Year	Title	Role	Notes
2023	Ma'am Chief: Shakedown in Seoul	Polly Penano	

=== Stage ===
Year	Title	Role	Notes
2008	I Dream: A Musicale on the Life of Henry Sy, Sr.	Young Henry Sy, Sr.	SM 50th Anniversary musical

== Concerts ==
=== Solo ===
Year	Title	Venue	Notes
2008	Moods	St. Joseph Parish Church, Poblacion, Carmona, Cavite (Diocese of Imus)	Fundraising concert (as Renzo Almario)

=== Guest appearances ===
Year	Concert/Event	Artist/Host	Appeared as
2016	Versus Verses	Cholo Bismonte	Himself (as part of Sugarpop, with Julie Anne San Jose and Rita Daniela); SDA Theater, De La Salle–College of Saint Benilde
2016	In Control	Julie Anne San Jose	Himself (as part of Sugarpop, with Cholo Bismonte and Jalynna Magadia, Sugarpop's stand-in vocalist); KIA Theater
2016	Laguna: Full Force	Kakai Bautista with Laguna Artists	Himself; The Library, Malate, Manila; benefit for Gantimpala Theater Foundation
2019	Vice Ganda Live in Davao: Ang Fantastic Concert ng Vaklang Twooh!	Vice Ganda	Himself (as part of iDolls); USEP Gymnasium, Davao City
2019	In the Spotlight: Jessica Sanchez	Jessica Sanchez	Himself (as part of iDolls)
2022	10th Annual Philippine Pride Party	OBar Philippines	Himself (as part of iDolls)
2025	Courage	Gerald Santos	Himself
2026	LoveLaban Pride PH Festival 2026	Pride PH Coalition / Quezon City Government	Himself; University of the Philippines Diliman, Quezon City

=== Live shows ===
Date	Title	Venue	Notes
November 29, 2018	Singing D' Colors: It's a Thursdate with Enzo Almario	Taggo Bar, Tomas Morato, Quezon City	Solo show
August 12, 2022	TNT Fridays featuring iDolls	Grand Bar & Lounge, Newport World Resorts	As part of iDolls; Almario absent (tested positive for COVID-19)
September 2, 2022	TNT Fridays featuring iDolls	Grand Bar & Lounge, Newport World Resorts	As part of iDolls; final iDolls performance
October 28, 2022	TNT Fridays featuring Enzo Almario and Anthony Castillo	Grand Bar & Lounge, Newport World Resorts	Solo (with Anthony Castillo)

== Fashion shows ==
Date	Show	Venue	Designer	Notes
November 23, 2024	Spring Glamour Fashion Show: Emergence	The Circle Event Place, Quezon City	Rey Calajate	
February 15, 2025	Imaginarium	PAROLA (Atrium & Multipurpose Hall), UP Fine Arts Gallery, UP College of Fine Arts, Quezon City	Rey Calajate and Basil Malicsi	In celebration of National Arts Month
November 23, 2025	Spring Glamour Fashion Show: Bloom	The Circle Event Place, Quezon City	Nhiel Catapang	

== Events and galas ==
Date	Event	Venue	Notes
November 27, 2022	Star Magical Christmas 2022	Sheraton Manila Hotel, Pasay City	Star Magic event
May 4, 2023	Star Magic Hot Summer LaHot Sexy! 2023	The Island at The Palace, BGC, Taguig	Star Magic event; theme: "Slay in any shape, any size, any age"
September 30, 2023	ABS-CBN Ball 2023	Makati Shangri-La Hotel	Theme: "Forever Grateful"; Black Tie

== Magazine features ==
Year	Publication	Feature
2023	Metro Magazine	#MetroBody 2023

== Endorsements and advertisements ==
Year	Brand/Organization	Campaign	Type	Notes
2006	Scholastic Philippines		Print advertisement	Posted in partner schools across the Philippines
2007–2008	Dickies		Brand endorsement	As part of Sugarpop
2007–2009	Ricky Reyes		Brand endorsement	As part of Sugarpop
2008	SM Supermalls	SM Kids Summer Campaign	Print advertisement	
2008–2009	Skin Food		Brand endorsement	As part of Sugarpop
2008–2009	BNY Jeans		Brand endorsement	As part of Sugarpop
2019	LoveYourself Inc.	Love Gala 2019	Video advertisement	Featured alongside partner Ceejay Serrano; campaign headlined by Pia Wurtzbach for HIV/AIDS awareness
2019	Viking's Luxury Buffet	Father's Day Special	Video advertisement	SM Mall of Asia; June 15, 2019
2024	Lan Hot Pot	Father's Day / Pride Month special	Video advertisement	Featured alongside partner Ceejay Serrano; LGBTQ+ inclusive campaign celebrating fathers who support their LGBT children; June 16, 2024

== Awards and nominations ==
=== As part of Sugarpop ===
Year	Award ceremony	Category	Nominated work	Result
2008	21st Awit Awards	Best Dance Recording	"Sugarpop"	Nominated
2009	22nd Awit Awards	Best Movie/TV/Stage Theme Song	"Aking Mundo" (from Dyesebel)	Nominated

=== Solo ===
Year	Award ceremony	Category	Result
2019	Gawad Agila Choice Awards	Rising Music Influencer of the Year	Won
2021	TAG Awards	Music	Won (Bronze Award)

Gawad Agila Choice Awards presented by Lyceum of Alabang Supreme Student Council

=== As part of iDolls ===
Year	Award ceremony	Category	Result
2021	RAWR Awards	Favorite Group	Nominated
