= Rita Daniela =

Filipino actress and singer (born 1995)

- Born: Rita Daniela de Guzman Iringan; September 15, 1995 (age 31); Quezon City, Philippines
- Other names: The Undeniable Star; Sultry Diva
- Occupations: Actress, singer, television host
- Years active: 2005–present
- Agents: Sparkle (2005–2026); Viva Artists Agency (2026–present)
- Known for: My Special Tatay; One of the Baes; Ang Dalawang Ikaw
- Height: 1.63 m (5 ft 4 in)
- Children: 1

Rita Daniela de Guzman Iringan (born September 15, 1995), popularly known as Rita Daniela (Tagalog: [ˈɾitɐ dɐˈɲɛlɐ]), is a Filipino actress, singer and television host. She won as the Grand Champion in the first season of Popstar Kids and has been tagged as "The Undeniable Star" for her soulful singing voice and versatile acting career.

In 2018, she gained recognition for her role as Susan "Aubrey" Palomares in the top-rated television drama My Special Tatay alongside Ken Chan, which spawned a popular love team between the two.

Daniela was one of the Journey Hosts in The Clash beginning from the second season until its fourth season. She was one of the main hosts in the musical-comedy variety show, All-Out Sundays.

== Career ==
Daniela's career was first launched in 2005 as "Rita De Guzman Iringan" after appearing in QTV's Pop Star Kids where competed alongside Julie Anne San Jose, Enzo Almario and emerged as the first grand champion. Since winning the contest, she has made numerous appearances on different shows on both GMA and QTV (now GTV).

In 2006, she became one of the members of the singing group Sugarpop, a children's group composed of the five finalists of the first season of PopStar Kids, with Enzo Almario, Julie Anne San Jose, Vanessa Rangadhol, and Cholo Bismonte. The musical group appeared regularly on GMA's concert television show SOP Rules until it disbanded in 2010 after the show was reformatted to Party Pilipinas.

Daniela began her acting career in several television dramas of GMA Network as "Rita Iringan." Her first acting project was a supporting role in the 2007 action-adventure drama Asian Treasures as Charlene. She later changed her screen name to "Rita de Guzman," using the surname of her maternal grandfather. She gained recognition for her "kontrabida" roles in the dramas Mundo Mo'y Akin and Villa Quintana in 2013, as well as Impostora in 2017.

In 2015, she was nominated for "Best Supporting Actress" in the 63rd FAMAS Awards for her role in the film Asintado. After deciding to focus on her singing career and signing with GMA Records (now GMA Music), she changed her screen name to Rita Daniela. She released her self-titled debut album on April of the same year.

In 2018, after taking a temporary break from acting in dramas, Daniela starred in a theatrical role as Anna in Eto Na! Musikal nAPO!, a jukebox musical based on the band APO Hiking Society's songs.

Daniela starred in My Special Tatay as Susan "Aubrey" Palomares alongside Ken Chan from 2018 until 2019, wherein she also sang the theme song. Her role later further rose her to prominence for her versatility as an actress. Daniela and Chan's on-screen partnership subsequently spawned the love team "BoBrey," a portmanteau of their characters' names in the drama, which then became "RitKen," a portmanteau of their first names. Daniela and Chan won for "Best Lead Performance (in a TV Series)" and the "German Moreno Power Tandem Award" in the 17th Gawad Tanglaw Awards and 33rd PMPC Star Awards for Television respectively. In 2019, they starred in their first GMA Telebabad drama together in the lead roles of One of the Baes. The two also starred in the 2021 film Huling Ulan sa Tag-Araw, in which Daniela was nominated for "Best Original Song" during the 2022 FAMAS Awards for her performance in the film's theme song, "Umulan Man o Umaraw." The song also won the "Best Original Theme Song" award in the 47th Metro Manila Film Festival.

In addition to acting, Daniela became a host of The Clash and All-Out Sundays in 2020. In 2023, she co-headlined the concert Queendom: Live with Julie Anne San Jose, Hannah Precillas, Thea Astley, Jessica Villarubin, and Mariane Osabel, where she was recognized as "The Undeniable Star."

== Personal life ==
Rita Daniela de Guzman Iringan was born on September 15, 1995, in Quezon City. She is the granddaughter of actor and comedian Teroy de Guzman. She began studying filmmaking in 2013 at the De La Salle–College of Saint Benilde.

In 2018, she revealed that she considered quitting acting to focus as a full-time college student. She temporarily took a break from the entertainment industry some time in between 2015 and 2018. A film student at the time, Daniela struggled to balance her career and education as she was working on her scholarship at Saint Benilde and felt that her studies interfered with her connection with her co-stars. She was encouraged to return by Gina Alajar, a fellow actress and renowned television director, who also directed Let the Love Begin in which Daniela starred in.

In June 2022, Daniela announced on All-Out Sundays her pregnancy. She gave birth via caesarean section to her son, Uno in December of the same year.

On June 15, 2023, she confirmed her separation from her boyfriend after four years of relationship.

In October 2024, Daniela filed lascivious behavior complaint against her co-Kapuso actor, Archie Alemania with the Bacoor City Prosecutor's Office. On October 24, 2025, Alemania was convicted and sentenced to a year of imprisonment.

In 2025, she announced her relationship with basketball player Mclaude Guadaña.

== Filmography ==
=== Film ===
Year	Title	Role
2007	Bahay Kubo: A Pinoy Mano Po!	Violet
2008	Last Supper No. 3	Ella
2009	Astig: Mga Batang Kalye	Coleen
2010	Dagim	Lila
2012	The Strangers	Celia
2014	Kamkam (Greed)	Sandra
2014	Asintado (Between the Eyes)	Rebecca
2019	Kiko en Lala	Aubrey
2020	In The Name of the Mother	Precious
2021	Huling Ulan sa Tag-Araw	Luisa
2022	Madawag ang Landas Patungong Pag-asa	Ms. Araceli "Ara" Lumawig

=== Television ===
Drama series
Year	Title	Role
2007	Asian Treasures	Charlene
2008	Kaputol ng Isang Awit	Young Sarah
2010	The Last Prince	Gigi
2011	Pahiram ng Isang Ina	Nenet
2012	Alice Bungisngis and her Wonder Walis	Wendy
2012	One True Love	Mavic
2012–2013	Paroa: Ang Kuwento ni Mariposa	Lizzy
2013	Mundo Mo'y Akin	Alison Alcantara
2013–2014	Villa Quintana	Patrice Quintana
2014–2015	Strawberry Lane	Lavinia Tolentino Bernarte
2015	Let the Love Begin	Luchie Estuar
2015–2016	Marimar	Vanessa Mejia
2017–2018	Impostora	Maureen Hilario
2018–2019	My Special Tatay	Susan "Aubrey" P. Labrador
2019–2020	One of the Baes	Jowa Biglangdapa / Princess Aragoza
2021	Ang Dalawang Ikaw	Mia Perez-Sarmiento
2024–2025	Widows' War	Rebecca Palacios
2024	Lilet Matias: Attorney-at-Law	Rebecca Palacios

Anthologies and sitcom appearances
Year	Title	Role
2009	G&G: Goals & Girls	Herself
2012	Magpakailanman:The Zendee Rose Story	Cham
2013	Maynila: Winner sa Puso	Lisa
2013	Magpakailanman: Isang Linggong Pag-ibig	Young Arlene Tolibas
2013-2014	Pepito Manaloto: Ang Tunay na Kuwento	Princess Lea Nolasco
2016	Wagas	Kristal
2016	Karelasyon: Hiya	Chicklets No. 1
2016	Karelasyon: Ate	Jessica
2018	Dear Uge	
2021	Regal Studio Presents: Anyare Sa'yo?	Baby Girl
2021	Tadhana: Kabayaran	Celine
2021	Regal Studio Presents: Your House, My Home	Ellie
2022	Magpakailanman: Queen of Piyok	Daniela Areglado Goc-Ong

Reality, variety and talk shows
Year	Title	Role
2005	Pop Star Kids	Herself (contestant / winner)
2005–08	SOP Rules	Herself (performer)
2006–07	Kids TV	Herself (host)
2008	Planet Q	Herself (host)
2012–13	Party Pilipinas	Herself (performer)
2013–15	Sunday All Stars	Herself (performer)
2015–2023	Eat Bulaga!	Herself (guest)
2015	The Ryzza Mae Show	Herself (guest)
2016–2021	Wowowin	Herself (guest)
2016	Superstar Duets	Herself (celebrity contestant)
2016–2019	Sunday PinaSaya	Herself (guest)
2017	All-Star Videoke	Herself (player / videoke star)
2018–2024	Sarap, 'Di Ba?	Herself (guest)
2018–2019	Studio 7	Herself (guest, 2018; co-host / performer, 2019)
2018	Tunay na Buhay	Herself (guest)
2019–2023	The Boobay and Tekla Show	Herself (guest)
2019–21	The Clash	Herself (Journey host)
2020–26	All-Out Sundays	Herself (main host / performer)
2022–2023	Family Feud Philippines	Herself (guest player)
2022–2024	TiktoClock	Herself (guest / performer / player)
2023	Battle of the Judges	Herself (guest)
2023	Fast Talk with Boy Abunda	Herself (guest)
2024	Tahanang Pinakamasaya	Herself (guest performer / "Duet for Love" judge)
2024–2025	It's Showtime	Herself (guest / judge / EXpecially for You performer)
2026	Eat Bulaga!	Herself (contestant / Gimme 5)
2026–present	ASAP XP	Herself (recurring guest / performer)

== Discography ==
=== Studio albums ===
- Rita Daniela (2015)

=== Extended play albums ===
- Forever With You (2015)
- Bobrey (live, 2019)

=== Other albums ===
- SugarPop (2008)

=== Singles ===
Year	Title	Song
2007	Princess Charming	"Princess Charming"
2010	First Time	"Pers Lab"
2013	The Greatest Love	"Dugong-dugong"
2013	My Lady Boss	"I'll Never Go"
2014	Kambal Sirena	"Sa Iyong Mundo" (with Julie Anne San Jose)
2014	Seasons of Love	"Seasons of Love"
2015	My Faithful Husband	"Hahanap-Hanapin Ka"
2017	Impostora	"Mapagkunwari" (previously sung by Faith Cuneta on 2007 remake)
2018	My Special Tatay	"Kahit Man Lang Sa Pangarap"
2020	One of the Baes	"Kaba" (duet with Ken Chan)
2021	I Heart Movies (GMA Network)	"I Heart Movies" (duet with Ken Chan)
2021	Ang Dalawang Ikaw	"Nandiyan Ka Pa Ba"
2023	Love Before Sunrise	"From Afar"
2024	Widows' War	"Bakit Ba Naman" (duet with Hannah Precillas)

== Stage ==
Year	Title	Role	Production
2011	″Snow White at ang Pitong Dwarfs	Snow White	Gantimpala Theater Foundation
2013	"Andres Bonifacio: The Musical"	Gregoria Silang	Gantimpala Theater Foundation
2017	Maynila, sa Mga Kuko ng Liwanag	Perla	GMG Productions
2018	Eto Na! Musikal nAPO!	Anna	Globe Live and 9Works Theatrical
2019	Eto Na! Musikal nAPO! (Re-run)	Anna	Globe Live and 9Works Theatrical
2024	Liwanag sa Dilim		

== Concerts ==
Date	Title	Venue	Ref.
May 11, 2019	My Special Love: #BoBreyinCONCERT	Music Museum	
December 2, 2023	Queendom: Live	Newport Performing Arts Theater	

== Awards and nominations ==
Year	Category	Award-giving body	Nominated work	Result
2015	Best Supporting Actress	63rd FAMAS Awards	Asintado	Nominated
2019	Best Actress (Tanghalan Stage)	GEMS Hiyas ng Sining Awards	Eto Na! Musical nAPO!	Nominated
2019	Gawad Rizal Award	Lyceum of the Philippines (LPU)	My Special Tatay	Won
2019	Best Lead Performance in a TV Series (w/ Ken Chan)	17th Gawad Tanglaw Awards	My Special Tatay	Won
2019	German Moreno Power Tandem of the Year (w/ Ken Chan)	33rd PMPC Star Awards for Television	N/A	Won
2020	Best Featured Performance in a Concert (w/ Ken Chan)	33rd Aliw Awards	Two-gether Again Concert (of Ms. Pops Fernandez and Martin Nievera)	Won
2021	Best Actress	International Film Festival Manhattan (IFFM)	In the Name of the Mother	Won {Honorable Mention}
2021	Best Actress	Filipino Academy of Movie Arts and Sciences (FAMAS)	Huling Ulan sa Tag-Araw	Nominated
