= Gerald Santos =

Filipino singer and actor (born 1991)

- Born: Gerald Padua Santos; May 15, 1991 (age 35); Navotas, Philippines
- Genre: Ballad
- Occupations: Singer, actor
- Years active: 2006–present
- Labels: Prinstar Music; GMA Records; Star Music

Gerald Padua Santos (born May 15, 1991) is a Filipino singer and actor who has appeared in several reality shows, musicals, films, and has released several songs. He first starred in the reality singing contest Pinoy Pop Superstar in 2006 and later went on to earn several awards.

== Early life ==
Gerald Padua Santos was born in Navotas on May 15, 1991, and was the second of his parents' five children. His parents both worked at the Navotas Fish Port, earning just enough to support their family, and supported his interest in music from an early age. He started singing at seven years old while attending Daanghari Elementary School. He later joined around 50 amateur singing contests in Metro Manila and nearby provinces, many of which he won. He was studying at Tangos National High School in Navotas when he decided to audition for Pinoy Pop Superstar at the age of fifteen.

In 2024, Santos disclosed that he had been raped in 2005 by Danny Tan, a musical director of GMA Network, when he was 15 years old. Santos added that he had since tried to commit suicide four times due to the psychogical trauma.

== Career ==
=== Singing ===
In 2006, Santos became the grand champion of the second season of GMA Network's Pinoy Pop Superstar. He was the youngest champion of the reality singing contest, then hosted by Regine Velasquez. He sang "Kahit Isang Saglit", "Hanggang", and "Close to Where You Are" as his winning songs on season two's final night, and was praised on the show for his heartfelt singing.

After winning Pinoy Pop Superstar, Santos signed a five-year contract with GMA Records, becoming a regular on the TV series SOP Rules. His first single, "A Day on the Rainbow", was released in 2006. In 2008, he released his second studio album, Pinakahihintay.

He transferred to TV5 in 2010, a year before his contract with GMA expired. He released a repackaged edition of Pinakahihintay and did a national mall tour promoting it. In 2011, he won Male Pop Artist of the Year as part of the 3rd Star Awards for Music for Pinakahihintay: The Repackaged Edition. His third album Gerald Santos: The Prince of Ballad released in 2012. The album won Revival Album of the Year in the 5th Star Awards for Music in 2013.

He released his all-original fourth album Gerald Santos Kahit Anong Mangyari in July 2015.

Santos signed a two-year contract with Star Music Philippines in May 2017, releasing the single "I am Yours" a month later in June 2017. The follow-up single "Hindi Pa Huli ang Lahat" was set to be released in August 2017.

=== Concerts ===
Santos has done five major solo concerts, and has been nominated for four consecutive years (2011 to 2014) as Best Male Concert Performer in the Aliw Awards, winning the award in 2011 for his Major Move concert at the Music Museum. In 2012, Santos held the Isang Pasasalmat concert at the PETA-PHINMA Theater.

The concert Gerald Santos: It's Time! was held at the SM North EDSA Skydome in 2014.

On June 13, 2015, his biggest concert, Gerald Santos: Metamorphosis, was held at PICC Plenary Hall.

At the SM North EDSA Skydome, Santos held Gerald Santos: Something New in My Life on April 9, 2017, with special guests Regine Velasquez and the UP Concert Chorus.

He headlined concerts held in Nottinghill, London, in 2017 and 2019.

Santos held Gerald Santos: The Homecoming Concert in 2019 at the Theater at Solaire with Jake Zyrus, along with Santos's Miss Saigon costars Aicelle Santos, Joreen Bautista, and Leo Valdez. In December 2019, Santos staged a major concert at NPAT Resorts World Manila, alongside guests Jett Pangarap, Nyoy Volante, Garrett Bolden, Rachel Chan, and Kyline Alcantara.

In 2022, he staged a concert in Vienna, Austria, with guests Kathy Aquino, Mark Agpas, and Isabel Garcia.

=== Music ===
Santos has composed and written fourteen songs, four of which were included in his sophomore album, Pinakahintay: The Repackaged Edition. These four were "Kailan Masasabi", "I Cannot Imagine", "This Feeling Inside", and "Gotta Be Strong". For San Pedro Calungsod: The Musical, he composed eight songs. For his fourth album, Gerald Santos Kahit Anong Mangyari, he did two compositions, "#MMK" and "Sorry".

=== Theater ===
Santos has played various lead roles in musicals; the first was in 2011, in the Gantimpala Theater Foundation's Sino Ka Ba Jose Rizal. His second musical was Matpil's San Pedro Calungsod: Teen Saint at Seventeen. The third was Redlife Entertainment Productions Inc.'s San Pedro Calungsod: The Musical, of which he was also the composer.

He auditioned for Miss Saigon in 2016 and was given the role of Thuy. He was part of the Miss Saigon UK/International Tour, which ran from July 2017 to March 2019 and covered five countries in the United Kingdom and Europe. Santos has performed 553 times as Thuy.

In October 2019, Santos played Anthony Hope in Atlantis Theatrical's staging of Sweeney Todd: The Demon Barber of Fleet Street. The musical was directed by Bobby Garcia and staged in the Theater at Solaire in Manila. Additionally, it was staged in 2020, in Singapore Marina Bay Sands Theatre from November 28 to December 8.

=== Television ===
His television career started with him becoming the grand champion of Pinoy Pop Superstar's second season on GMA in 2006.

Santos was also part of SOP and Party Pilipinas on GMA and was cast in GMA's primetime teleseries I Luv New York in 2006 where he played the brother of its lead, played by Jolina Magdangal. Additionally, he cohosted QTV's Popstar Kids.

On TV5, he appeared in the shows P.O.5 (2010), Fantastik (2011), Sunday Funday (2012), and Hey It's Saberday! (2012). He sang the theme song in Sa Ngalan ng Ina, composed by National Artist Ryan Cayabyab.

Santos has been performing on the song-writing competition A Song of Praise on UNTV channel 37, hosted by Richard Reynoso and Toni Rose Gayda.

=== Movies ===
Santos finished his first feature film in 2015, Memory Channel, directed by Rayn Brizuela and co-starring Epy Quizon, Bodjie Pascua, and Michelle Vito. The movie was an official selection for the 2016 World Premieres Film Festival, where it competed against five other Filipino films. Santos received favorable reviews for his acting as an amnesia patient suffering from anxiety and panic attacks.

Santos played the titular character in the documentary film Emilio Jacinto: Utak ng Katipunan, produced by the National Historical Commission and directed by Pat Perez.

His other movie credits include Al Coda with Marion Aunor (2022), Mamasapano: Now It Can Be Told (2022), and Oras de Peligro (2023).

=== List of awards and nominations ===
Year	Organization	Award	Work	Result
2006	GMA Network	People's Choice Award	Pinoy Pop Superstar Grand Finals	Won
2006	Star Awards for Television	New Male TV Personality	SOP	Nominated
2011	3rd Star Awards for Music	Male Pop Artist of the Year	Pinakahihintay: The Repackaged Edition	Won
2011	24th Aliw Awards	Best Concert Performance (Male)	Major Move Concert, Music Museum	Won
2011	24th Aliw Awards	Best Actor in a Musical	Sino Ka Ba Jose Rizal	Nominated
2012	25th Aliw Awards	Best Concert Performance (Male)	Isang Pasasalamat, PETA-PHINMA Theater	Nominated
2013	5th Star Awards for Music	Male Recording Artist of the Year	Gerald Santos: The Prince of Ballad	Nominated
2013	5th Star Awards for Music	Male Pop Artist of the Year	Gerald Santos: The Prince of Ballad	Nominated
2013	5th Star Awards for Music	Revival Album of the Year	Gerald Santos: The Prince of Ballad	Won
2013	5th Star Awards for Music	Male Concert Performer of the Year	The Prince of Ballad Soaring High, Music Museum	Nominated
2013	26th Aliw Awards	Best Concert Performance (Male)	The Prince of Ballad Soaring High, Music Museum	Nominated
2014	27th Aliw Awards	Best Concert Performance (Male)	It's Time!, SM North Edsa Skydome	Nominated
2015	7th Star Awards for Music	Male Concert Performer of the Year	It's Time!, SM North Edsa Skydome	Nominated
2015	7th Star Awards for Music	Male Pop Artist of the Year	Kahit Anong Mangyari	Nominated
2015	7th Star Awards for Music	Male Pop Artist of the Year	Kahit Anong Mangyari	Nominated
2015	Gawad Pasado	Unknown	Pinakapasadong Dangal ng Kabataan	Won
2015	28th Aliw Awards	Best Major Concert (Male)	Gerald Santos: Metamorphosis	Won
2017	30th Aliw Awards	Best Concert Performance (Male)	Something New In My Life, SM North Edsa Skydome	Won
2018	9th Star Awards for Music	Male Concert Performer of the Year	Something New In My Life, SM North Edsa Skydome	Nominated
2018	9th Star Awards for Music	Concert of the Year	Something New In My Life, SM North Edsa Skydome	Nominated
2019	10th Star Awards for Music	Male Concert Performer of the Year	Gerald Santos: The Homecoming Concert, The Theatre at Solaire	Nominated
2019	32nd Aliw Awards	Best Major Concert (Male)	Gerald Santos: The Homecoming Concert, The Theatre at Solaire	Won
2020	33rd Aliw Awards	Best Major Concert (Male)	UNLIMITED, NPAT Resorts World Manila	Won
2020	33rd Aliw Awards	Best Online Performer	The Great Shift	Won
2020	33rd Aliw Awards	Entertainer of the Year	—N/a	Won
2021	BroadwayWorld Philippines	Stage Performer of the Decade	San Pedro Calungsod the Musical	Won
2022	35th Aliw Awards	Best Lead Actor in a Musical	I Will: The Musical, Metropolitan Theater	Won
2022	35th Aliw Awards	Entertainer of the Year	—N/a	Won
2023	BroadwayWorld Philippines	Stage Performer of the Year	I Will: The Musical, Metropolitan Theater	Won

== Discography ==
=== Albums ===
- A Day on the Rainbow (November 2006) – contains his official first hit song "Mahal Kita", which became the theme song of the TV series Marimar on Channel 7.
- Pinakahihintay (November 2008) – contains his revival of the song "Hanggang", which Santos sang in his first TV appearance in Pinoy Pop Superstar, scoring 99% from the judges.
- Pinakahihintay: The Repackaged Edition (October 2010) – contains original compositions.
- Gerald Santos: The Prince Of Ballad (September 2012) – was Santos's first revival album.
- Gerald Santos Kahit Anong Mangyari (March 2015)

=== Singles ===
- "I Am Yours" (June 2017) – composed by Francis "Kiko" Salazar.
- "Hindi Pa Huli ang Lahat"
- "Hanggang sa Muli"
- "Ibulong Mo Na Sa 'Kin"
- "Sorry"
- "Wagas"
- "Di Kaylalangan Pang Mangako"
- "Ibalik"
- "Finally"
- "I Will"
- "Hanggang" (2023) – original studio recording.
