= LoveYourself =

Healthcare organization in the Philippines

- Abbreviation: LY
- Formation: 2011; 15 years ago
- Founder: Ronivin Garcia Pagtakhan
- Region served: Philippines
- Services: HIV testing, medication distribution, HIV policymaking
- Staff: 90 (2019)
- Volunteers: 1,200 (2019)
- Website: loveyourself.ph

LoveYourself Inc. is an HIV/AIDS health care community-based organization based in the Philippines. It also runs sexual health clinics.

== History ==
LoveYourself was established in 2011, by Ronivin Garcia Pagtakhan and his friends. It is a community-based organization aiming to provide free testing for sexually transmitted diseases (STD) and provides access to pre and post-exposure prophylaxis (PrEP) medications.

LoveYourself relies on volunteers and donations from the private firms. And until 2025, with funding from the United States government via USAID and the President's Emergency Plan for AIDS Relief.

== Purpose and services ==
LoveYourself combats the stigmatization of seeking sexual and reproductive health. It also serves as a support group for people with HIV/AIDs and provides HIV testing services. It has provided aid to private companies in formulating HIV Workplace Policy in compliance with the provisions of the HIV/AIDS Prevention Act of 1998. It has also expanded its scope to include transgender health care and mental health.

== Clinics ==
As of 2016, LoveYourself runs two clinics in Metro Manila. As of that period, the facilities conduct half of the HIV testing in the metropolis or 23 percent nationwide. In 2025, LoveYourself has 22 clinics.
