= Pop Star Kids =

Philippine television reality show

- Title card
- Genre: Reality competition
- Presented by: Kyla
- Country of origin: Philippines
- Original language: Tagalog
- No. of seasons: 2

Production
- Camera setup: Multiple-camera setup
- Running time: 60 minutes
- Production company: GMA Entertainment TV

Original release
- Network: QTV/Q
- Release: November 19, 2005 – July 29, 2007

Pop Star Kids is a Philippine television reality competition show broadcast by QTV. Hosted by Kyla, it premiered on November 19, 2005. The show concluded on July 29, 2007, with a total of two seasons.

== Cast ==
Season 1

- Rita Iringan (winner)
- Cholo Bismonte
- Julie Anne San Jose
- Vanessa Rangadhol
- Enzo Almario

Season 2

- Kierulf Raboy (winner)
- Marion Torres (winner)
- Tabitha Caro
- Suzette Soyangco
- Gidget dela Llana
- Jalynna Magadia
- Jessica Reynoso
- Dino Canido
