= Star for a Night (Philippine TV series) =

- Genre: Reality competition
- Created by: Intercontinental Broadcasting Corporation; Viva Television
- Directed by: Jon Ilagan
- Presented by: Regine Velasquez
- Country of origin: Philippines
- Original language: Filipino

Production
- Executive producer: Vic del Rosario
- Running time: 60 minutes

Original release
- Network: Intercontinental Broadcasting Corporation
- Release: March 31, 2002 – March 1, 2003

Related
- Search for a Star (GMA Network)

Star for a Night is a Philippine television reality competition show broadcast by IBC. Hosted by Regine Velasquez, it aired from March 31, 2002, to March 1, 2003, replacing Musika Atbp. and was replaced by Amazing Twins. The grand finals took place in ULTRA in Pasig.

== Show summary ==
The show was a Philippine version of the British singing talent show Star for a Night and auditioned singers across the country to perform on a 1-hour Saturday night show (started airing Easter Sunday of 2002), broadcast from 8-9pm on IBC.

It is best remembered for the performances of Sarah Geronimo, who at the age of fourteen won the competition, including a ₱1 million cash prize and a managerial contract with Vicente del Rosario, the owner of Viva Artists Agency. Anne Curtis, who just started her showbiz career, once served as member of the Board of Judges.

Singer and actress Athena Tibi was also discovered on the show and signed to Viva Artists Agency, where she debuted as part of pop group 3Yo, before moving into musicals and later moving to Japan.

Sarah Geronimo was given the title of Pop Star Princess as a result of the show. Her mother said, "Her cash prize in Star for a Night was a big help, this school year, we don't need to borrow money from other people because of my children's tuition fees."

Other notable contestants including Mark Bautista who also became a successful recording artist and actor, Florie May Lucido or Reema Lucida became a contender in Born Diva, Maureen Marcelo who won the Philippine Idol, Mae Flores who made it as one of the top 12 contenders in Pinoy Idol who finished in 11th place and member of Blush which is an Asian girl group originally composed of five members from the Philippines, India, Hong Kong, Japan, and South Korea, Angeline Quinto, the winner of Star Power: The Search for the Next Female Pop Superstar and Kristela Musica Cristobal who was one of the greatest contenders and Klarisse de Guzman, runner-up of the first season of The Voice of the Philippines, with Sarah Geronimo as her coach. This is their first collaboration after more than a decade.

The success of the show led to a second season, called Search for a Star.

The grand finals night of Star for a Night was re-aired on TV5 on January 30, 2016, as a preparation for the newly produced singing talent search Born to Be a Star.

== Grand finalists ==
- Sarah Geronimo - Winner
- Mark Bautista
- Maureen Marcelo
- Florie May Lucido
- Jason Velasquez
- Angeline Quinto
- Mailyn Yu
- Angeli Mae Flores
- Roxanne Castro
- Kristela Musica Cristobal
- Carlo San Jose

== Semi-finalists ==
- Athena Tibi
- Argie Jazmin
- Klarisse de Guzman
- Arnie Vale
