= Kundirana =

Secondary school music ministry in the Philippines

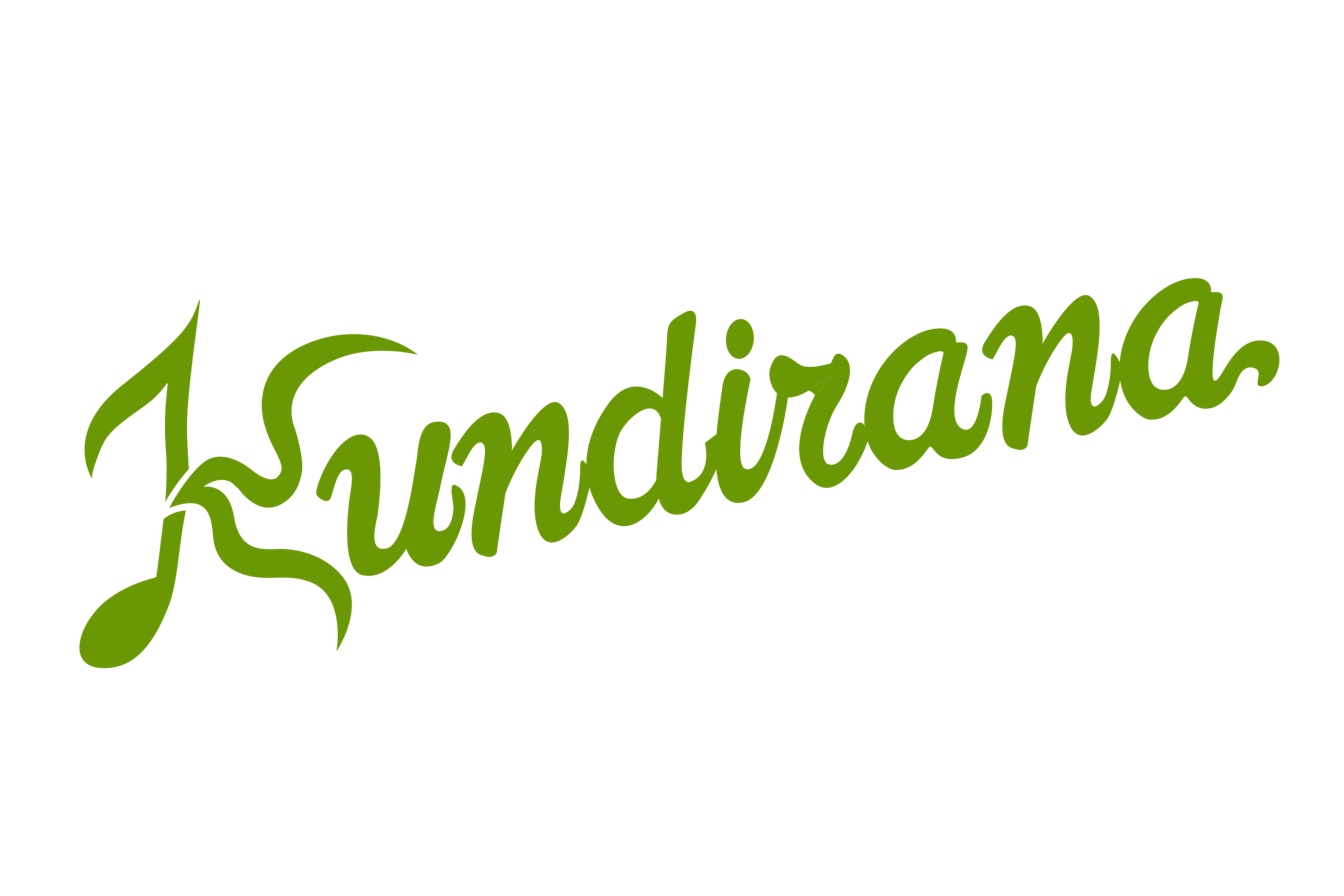
Logo of the Kundirana Music Ministry of La Salle Green Hills

The Kundirana is a high school music ministry from La Salle Green Hills. It is one of the most renowned and prestigious high school musical groups in the Philippines, with many of its alumni becoming award-winning artists and celebrities. They are nationally honored with the "Aliw Award as Best Cultural Group in the Philippines". Its members are a select few senior high school students who are chosen through auditions. Over the years, the group has played in various parts in the Philippines and around the world.

== Composition and history ==
The Kundirana is a high school music ministry and organization composed of Senior High School students from La Salle Green Hills. The group was formally founded on 1971, guided by Lasallian Brother Gus L. Boquer FSC, EdB. The name "Kundirana" is derived from the combination of the words Kundiman and Harana.

The members are carefully picked after rigorous auditions for talented singers and musicians. While the number of students who audition ranges from 50 to 70, only about a handful are chosen (depending on the number of graduating members). The final number of selected members is usually 10 to 16. Once chosen, a Kundirana member undergoes intense training in singing and dancing, eventually becoming ambassadors of goodwill.

In August 1987, the Kundirana was nationally honored with the Aliw Award as Best Cultural Group in the Philippines.

From 2012 to 2024, under the guidance of Kundirana alumnus, Monet Silvestre, the Kundirana was transformed into a live band with a complete combination of guitars, drums, keyboards, and a number of vocalists. It emphasized on covers, medleys, interactions with the crowd, and even originals. As a tradition, every Kundirana batch since 2012 performs their famous rendition of "Kumusta, Mga Kaibigan" by Maria Cafra, complete with rehearsed choreo and instrumental solos as the opening for all of their main concerts.

The Kundirana would go on to play a variety of songs in their concerts. Depending on where the concert is, they would play songs ranging from classic Disco anthems to the mainstream pop songs of the decade. They would also perform original compositions – prominently "I'll Be Still", "Do It For Love", and "He Has Risen" which were all arranged and written by music director Monet Silvestre.

In July 2024, Monet Silvestre was replaced as Kundirana Music Director by Ramon "Montet" Acoymo. Under Acoymo's direction, the live band set up was abolished and the music ministry focused on choral performances.

== Notable alumni ==
The group is known for developing professional singers and musical artists, including Gary Valenciano, Ogie Alcasid, Randy Santiago, Monet Silvestre, Gian Magdangal of Philippine Idol, and Mel Villena

== Concerts ==
Each Kundirana batch has a number of concerts per year, including a "Maiden Concert" (meaning the first major Kundirana concert held in La Salle Green Hills), and a "Farewell Concert" in June. The Kundirana has held concerts across the Philippines and around the world. They have held many concerts in the United States.

They performed at the opening of the NCAA Season 83 in San Juan Arena where they sang the national anthem. In 2012, during the inauguration of Noynoy Aquino, they performed a number with Ogie Alcasid and Regine Velasquez.

The KUNDIRANA celebrated its 40th anniversary with a grand reunion concert at the CCP entitled "KUNDIRANA KWARENTA NA! The Men, Music and Mission".

== Charity Work ==
The Kundirana uses its public ministry to serve the needy. The ministry aims to bring joy to the sick, the elderly and the forgotten through music. Among their missionary works, the Kundirana donates all of their acquired funds to Bahay Pag-Asa, a halfway house for misguided juveniles in Bacolod, Negros Occidental and in Dasmariñas. The Kundirana has helped build classrooms in many parts of the Philippines.

== Nuestra Señora De Guia ==
Kundirana is a vocal ensemble whose performances focus on inspirational and spiritual themes.

These young men accomplish this task not only through their selfless commitment to the service for others that is fueled by an enlightenment behind-the-scenes moral formation which includes a strict code of conduct, ethics and discipline and the molding of a meaningful prayer life.

This task is also accomplish by the group's faith and devotion to Christ and a special relationship with the Blessed Mother. In all of Kundirana's engagements and travels, they are accompanied by the image of the Nuestra Señora De Guia, Our Lady of Guidance, whose home is the Ermita Church.

She is the oldest Marian image in the Philippines, is truly the guide of these young men as she leads their way through the difficult paths to people's hearts. Some, hardened. turned to tender devotion, and others, hungry perhaps for our Lady's succor, rekindled in themselves warm compassion for her.

She was, and is, an important part of the Kundirana's mission. The Lady is there, always leading the Kundirana's way to touch people's hearts, not only through their music, but more importantly, by the example of their faith.

== Kundirana 2004: The Instrument ==
Kundirana 2004 saw the first multimedia concert of the singing group. Held in November 2003 at the AFP Theater, the music ministry then shifted its gears for a massive rebrand led by multi-award-winning musical director Von De Guzman with TV personality Tonipet Gaba as the stage director. Their costumes at that time were designed by renowned designer JC Buendia, and consisted of suits and trench coats as well as swarovski crystal-embellished baseball shirts. For the first and only time in Kundirana history, they were accompanied by a 40-piece orchestra, the Kundirana Philharmonic Orchestra, for their maiden concert. This orchestra also recorded backing tracks for their numerous concerts around the Philippines and abroad. Along with these, a massive multimedia screen was set up front and center to complement each performance during the concert. During their maiden concert, faculty members and female high school students served as guests in some of their performances. Kundirana 2004 was also able to do several TV guestings and mall shows during the year to promote their maiden concert. The batch recorded their album titled The Instrument and sold copies during their concerts to bolster fund-raising efforts. Amidst all the exposure and travel, the group kept consistent contributions to several charitable institutions, most notably to the Bahay Pag-asa youth center in Bacolod.

Kundirana 2004 bid farewell during their farewell concert staged at the Meralco Theater in June 2004 with Gary Valenciano, a Kundirana alumnus himself, as special guest.

In 2008, the Kundirana 2004 were invited by LSGH for a reunion concert in celebration of the high school's 50th year celebration called the Singkwenta series. It was held at the St. Joseph's Theatre in LSGH with the complete roster of singers performing for the full concert.

== Kundirana 2012: Change The World ==
Kundirana 2012 is the 41st batch of the Kundirana Music Ministry. They had their maiden concert in October 2011. The following month, several alumni joined in participating in the grand reunion concert of the 40th year of the Kundirana Music Ministry held at the CCP representing the current Kundirana batch.

This is the first Kundirana batch directed by Monet Silvestre, a Kundirana alumnus. This batch bears the distinction of having brought back the existence of the five-member Kundirana Band. They bring the live-music element to each of their performances which in previous years was absent.

In January 2012, the group had their DLSDasmarinas concert with Gary Valenciano. In February 2012, the Kundirana 2012 was invited to perform again in Guam by Archbishop Anthony Sablan Apuron of the Roman Catholic Archdiocese of Agana. On April 21, 2012, the group held a concert in the city of Davao wit. Ogie Alcasid to celebrate a donation to the One La Salle Scholarship Fund by the DLSS – Davao Chapter, which was matched by an anonymous donor who witnessed the whole performance by the batch including Ogie Alcasid. Followed by the Davao concert, the group headed to the west coast of USA to do their annual California tour, holding concerts in Carlsbad, San Diego, Diamond Bar, Los Angeles, Chula Vista, San Diego, Murrieta Mesa, Temecula and Sacramento.

They had their Farewell concert on June 28, 2012, at the Bro. Donato Center for the Performing Arts in La Salle Green Hills which was supposed to be their final concert as a batch. However, in July 2012, they were invited again to perform a final concert in La Salle Ozamis to help raise funds for a typhoon that had hit the area.

== Kundirana 2013: For The Love ==
Kundirana 2013 is the 42nd batch of the Kundirana Music Ministry. They had their maiden concert October 2012. In the following month they toured around different Lasallian schools.

== Kundirana 2014: Heart and Soul ==
Kundirana 2014 is the 43rd batch of the Kundirana Music Ministry. They had their maiden concert in October 2013. In the following month, theytoured around different Lasallian schools. They performed for the Ombudsman of the Philippines, Conchita Carpio Morales. They also toured around different Lasallian schools like University of St. La Salle in Bacolod, Negros Occidental, De La Salle Zobel, De La Salle Medical and Health Sciences Institute and La Salle Academy Iligan City. Kundirana 2014 also performed at Flushing Meadows in Bohol.

Kundirana also had several television appearances: on ABS-CBN's DZMM TeleRadyo; on Umagang Kay Ganda, a famous morning show in the Philippines; and on a Holy Friday special featuring the music video of Kundirana 2014's original song, "I'll be still, I'll be healed".

The batchrecorded their original song composed by their musical director, Monet Silvestre, entitled "I'll Be Still, I'll Be Healed". The song focuses on the love of Mary for Christ and for the people.

In April to May, the Kundirana 2014 had a concert tour in the US. The group visited four cities in California: TTemecula, North San Diego, Chula Vista, and Sacramento.

== Kundirana 2023: Stand By Me ==
After many months of not being able to perform live due to the COVID-19 pandemic, the Kundirana were finally able to get back on the big stage full-time with the introduction of Kundirana 2023 #StandByMe, the 52nd batch of the Music Ministry.

=== Concerts and performances ===
On December 18, 2022, the Kundirana 2023 had their first performance at the National Shrine of the Divine Child. They performed mass songs and their Christmas Medley. A few weeks later on February 10, 2023, they performed for "Pantablay: Lasallian Educators' Day".

Being a tradition, they performed at the Kabihasnan Fair, a biyearly school event at La Salle Green Hills, on February 19, 2023.

Their first off-campus performance was on February 25, 2023, at the DSWD Reception and Study Center for Children, where they serendaded and gave out gifts to the staff and children. The next day, they performed at Kalopsia 2023 at St. Paul College, Pasig.

The Kundirana 2023 had their first corporate event at Grand Hyatt – Manila during the Prudence Ball 2023 – PRULIFE UK Awards Night on March 18, 2023. At this event, they performed a rendition of the Philippine National Anthem and played their "Boyband Medley". They stated, "It was truly an honor to perform at this prestigious event. We would like to thank everyone involved in making this happen!" on their social media post about the event.

On March 25, 2023, the Kundirana performed at the La Salle Green Hills field for Grade 7 Family Day. The next day, they performed at the Miriam College Grade School Variety Show.

Just like the past batches, they held a two-hour performance at De La Salle University - Dasmariñas on March 31, 2023.

On April 17, 2023, Kundirana 2023 singer Geoff Naguit celebrated his birthday at the Matrix Creation Events Venue, Quezon City, with Kundirana performing as the main event. They performed various songs ranging from disco and OPM to pop. On April 24, they performed at Benilde Gym, La Salle Green Hills, for the Grade 9 "My First Date".

They performed at the Jaime Hilario Integrated School – La Salle, Bataan on April 28, 2023, and at Assumption Antipolo's "Station Nova", a school fair, the next day.

Kundirana 2023 was the first batch to visit Santiago, Isabela, performing at Binibining Santiago 2023 and being the opening act for Kamikazee and Hale on May 4 and 5, respectively. They were also featured on the local radio DWMX Sweet Radio 97.7.

On May 13, 2023, they held a special concert for the Philippine Lasallian Family Convocation at the Br. Donato Center at La Salle Green Hills. On May 19, they performed at the 2023 AXA BANKASSURE Annual Awards "Extraordinare" held in Marriot Hotel, Manila. They performed a rendition of "Salamat – The Dawn" alongside the Manila Symphony Orchestra. On May 22, they performed at the Manila Hotel for the 50th Golden Anniversary of Mayor Omeng Ramos and his wife, Rhiamar Ramos.

On June 3, they performed at La Salle Green Hills' "My First Date" for Grade 10 students. On June 6, they performed at the Tala National High School, Holy Rosary College, Caloocan City.

On June 10, 2023, the Kundirana performed at La Salle Green Hills' "Seine: A Midnight In Paris" for the graduating batch of 2023, which was held at the St. Benilde Gym.

They held their Farewell Concert on June 17, 2023, rocking the Br. Donato Center for three straight hours. At the end, they performed "Magpakailanman", an original composed by their music director, Monet Silvestre.

On June 26, 2023, they returned to Santiago, Isabela, to perform a "Free Concert For A Cause". They held their two-hour concert at the Santiago City National High School. They were invited to perform at the "Animosome: Retro Party" on August 26, 2023.

Their last and final concert as a batch happened on September 16, 2023, at the Nuestra Señora De Peñafrancia Fiesta at Gumaca, Quezon. This was also the first time any Kundirana batch had performed at Gumaca.

== Kundirana 2026: Next in Line ==
PERFORMANCE AND CONCERTS

On October 19, 2025, Kundirana 2026 made their first public appearance, making stops at the Imus Sports Complex and Bahay Pag-asa in Dasmariñas, Cavite.

On January 9 and 10, they held their Maiden concert for two days, at the Brother Donato Center for Arts in La Salle Green Hills. By showcasing their talents in singing and dancing, the group delivered a refreshing and energetic performance, with songs ranging from the 70s up to the modern times, showcasing a musical journey through the years of the musical industry.

Coming back to Dasmariñas on March 12, the group performed for public school students in Dasma Arena, with a total crowd of 5,000 people.
