= The Singing Bee (Philippine game show) =

- Title card
- Genre: Game show
- Created by: Phil Gurin; Bob Horowitz
- Based on: The Singing Bee by Phil Gurin and Bob Horowitz
- Directed by: Bobet Vidanes
- Presented by: Cesar Montano (2008–2010); Amy Perez and Roderick Paulate (2013–2015)
- Starring: The Honeybees; The Songbees; The Bandble Bee led by Mel Villena
- Opening theme: The Singing Bee theme song (English version) (2008–2010); The Singing Bee theme song (Filipino version) (2013–2015)
- Country of origin: Philippines
- Original languages: Filipino (primary); English (secondary)
- No. of seasons: 7
- No. of episodes: 333

Production
- Executive producers: Carlo L. Katigbak; Cory V. Vidanes; Laurenti M. Dyogi; Luis L. Andrada; Paeancyd Pearl Sabangan; Carla St. Anne Burwell
- Camera setup: Multiple-camera setup
- Running time: Season 1: 30-45 minutes (Weekdays); Season 2–4: 1 hour (Weekends); Season 5: 1 hour (Saturdays); Season 6-7: 1 hour (Saturdays and Weekdays)
- Production companies: Juma Entertainment; The Gurin Company; ABS-CBN Studios

Original release
- Network: ABS-CBN
- Release: April 21, 2008 – February 6, 2010
- Release: November 16, 2013 – February 6, 2015

Related
- All-Star K All Star Videoke; Everybody, Sing!

The Singing Bee is a Philippine television karaoke game show broadcast by ABS-CBN. The show is a based on the American version of the same title. Originally hosted by Cesar Montano, it aired on the network's Primetime Bida line up from April 21, 2008, to February 6, 2010, replacing Kung Fu Kids and was replaced by Pilipinas Got Talent. The show returned on the network's Yes Weekend line up from November 16, 2013, to February 6, 2015, replacing ABS-CBN Sabado Specials: Shake, Rattle & Roll and was replaced by Kapamilya Blockbusters. Amy Perez and Roderick Paulate serve as the final hosts. A combinination of karaoke singing and a spelling bee-style competition, this show features contestants trying to remember the lyrics to popular songs.

In each episode, six contestants will be selected from the audience to play a series of games that test their knowledge of song lyrics. Contestants making an error forfeit their chance to get into the "musical chairs". Contestants not in a musical chair position when the round is over are eliminated. The grand prize is P1,000,000. It was presented by Amy Perez and Roderick Paulate for its sixth and seventh seasons; it was previously hosted by Cesar Montano for five seasons. The house band, Bandble Bee, is led by Mel Villena, with several house singers called The Songbees. Dancing to the band are the house dancers, The Honeybees.

== History ==
The Singing Bee premiered on April 21, 2008, replacing Kung Fu Kids.

On the August 22 episode, the show was supposed to end their first season but it was announced that the show was given an extended run due to insistent public demand. The show's first-season finale was aired September 5, 2008. But after the end of season one finale, it was revealed in a teaser wherein the bee singing "The Singing Bee" theme song which means The Singing Bee will be returning soon. Recently, another teaser pertaining to its return was aired. The second season was a 1-hour show that aired every weekend starting October 11, 2008.

On December 28, 2008, the show started the BeeKada Edition wherein 5 groups consisting of 3 members are the contestants (2 members per group at one time on September 12, 2009). The BeeDeoke Round was removed from the game format. The prizes were increased as well including the Jackpot prize on the Final Countdown which is now worth two million pesos P2,000,000 On April 18 and 19, 2009, The Singing Bee celebrated their 1st Year Anniversary and it also marked the end of season two. It followed the third season starting April 25, 2009.

On its season three, they replaced the segment Jumblebee round with a new segment called Pics Bee with You Round.

In September 2009, The Singing Bee season four finale was aired. It was announced on this episode that season five will start on October 3, 2009, with their new schedule every Saturday nights at 7:30pm to 8:30pm.

On its fifth season, they brought back the segment Jumblebee round to replace the Pics Bee with You Round based on viewers' requests.

After three years, The Singing Bee marked its comeback with the sixth season premiered on November 16, 2013. It aired Saturday afternoons at 3:30pm until February 22, 2014. On February 24, 2014, the show moved to weekday mornings at 11:00am to 11:45am, replacing Minute to Win It. The new format changes include a Daily Champion from Monday to Thursday, with all four champions returning on Friday to compete for the P1,000,000 Final Countdown. On July 16, 2014, the show changed its timeslot to 10:45am due to Typhoon Glenda. The season six ended on August 29, 2014, as the show temporarily ceased off to give way for the 2014 FIBA Basketball World Cup.

During the start of season seven, the show returned on September 16, 2014, with their one-hour schedule every 10:30am to 11:30am. It featured a new segment round called 2 Beecome 1. On its first anniversary on November 14, 2014, hosts KD and Amay became players with Billy Crawford as the special guest host. The season seven ended on February 6, 2015, with the finale episode featuring returning champions Sheryl Cruz, Frenchie Dy and Bodie Cruz as players, and FlordeLiza star Jolina Magdangal as the 8-time defending champion. The show was put on hiatus and has so far never returned due to Roderick Paulate's decision to run for councilor of Quezon City and focus his time as a politician, whereas Amy Perez still hosts Umagang Kay Ganda. It was later replaced by Kapamilya Blockbusters.

After its final episode on February 6, 2015, Magdangal and Magalona joins the first season of Your Face Sounds Familiar.

== Gameplay ==
At the start of the show, the band plays a song and the host "randomly" gives audience members a chance to sing part of the song. The players are selected through a draw conducted by a private auditing firm. Six contestants will be chosen to compete in various rounds until the day's winner and defending champion are left standing in The Final Countdown.

=== Segments ===
==== To Bee Continued ====
One of the hosts would provide the year the song was released, the performer, and the title of the song. A portion of the song is performed, and then the contestant has to attempt to sing the next line of the song. If correct, they will claim a seat and advance to the next round, and a new song is introduced, which the next contestant in line must attempt; if not, they have to step back, and the next person in line tries the same song. A song is thrown out if none of the remaining contestants get the line correct. The first three contestants who claim a seat advance to the next round. The first one, participate as purple team. The second one, participate as green team. The third one, participate as orange (from every Saturday)/blue (from weekdays) team. The last one, participate as blue team (which now goes to third player from weekdays).

==== BeeDeoke ====
The three/four remaining contestants try to sing a song in a fill-in-the-blank format and correctly answer 9 blanks (three blanks for each contestant). After the To Bee Continued/JumbleBee round, the contestant who accumulated the most points will get to play in the final countdown/the new round called 2 Beecome 1. Every contestants need to fill the every missing parts of the lyrics three times. First missing part filled corrected, costs 3 (from seasons 6)/2 (from seasons 7) points. Second missing part filled corrected, costs 6 (from seasons 6. now on filled missing third part on season 7)/4 (from seasons 7), and third missing part filled corrected, costs 6(from seasons 7)/9 (from seasons 6) points. For total score the host will add the previous rounds points: JumbleBee points + BeeDeoke points = Total score (from November 16, 2013 – August 8, 2014), To Bee Continued points + JumbleBee points + BeeDeoke points = Total score (from August 11–29, 2014), and To Bee Continued points + BeeDeoke points = Total score (from September 16, 2014 – February 6, 2015). This costs 8, 5, and 11 points (from season 6), And 4, 6, and 8 points (from season 7).

If the champion concede their title, the first 2 high-scorers will proceed to the Final Countdown (from seasons 6 from every saturdays and weekdays (except Feb 24-august 8) or 2 Beecome 1 (from season 7) round. But it still retain its mechanics.

The segment first appeared in October 2008 but was discontinued after the Beekada Edition started. In Season 6, the segment returned and merged with Singing With The Enemy.

==== Scoring ====
In the round of BeeDeoke, the host will count which points from the earlier round and from this round which points they got. For total score the host will solve the points: JumbleBee points + BeeDeoke points = Total score (from November 16, 2013 – August 8, 2014), To Bee Continued points + JumbleBee points + BeeDeoke points = Total score (from August 11–29, 2014), and To Bee Continued points + BeeDeoke points = Total score (from September 16, 2014 – February 6, 2015).

Saturday Table:

Player	JumbleBee	BeeDeoke	Total score
(Name of a first player)	(Number of a point)	(Number of a point)	(Total score)
(Name of a second player)	(Number of a point)	(Number of a point)	(Total score)
(Name of a third player)	(Number of a point)	(Number of a point)	(Total score)
(Name of a fourth player)	(Number of a point)	(Number of a point)	(Total score)

Weekdays Table (remastered. orange removed. no defending champion available from Feb 24-Aug 8, 2014):

Player	JumbleBee	BeeDeoke	Total score
(Name of a first player)	(Number of a point)	(Number of a point)	(Total score)
(Name of a second player)	(Number of a point)	(Number of a point)	(Total score)
(Name of a third player)	(Number of a point)	(Number of a point)	(Total score)

Weekday Table (remastered. From August 11–29, 2014):

Player	To bee continued	JumbleBee	BeeDeoke	Total score
(Name of a first player)	(Number of a point)	(Number of a point)	(Number of a point)	(Total score)
(Name of a second player)	(Number of a point)	(Number of a point)	(Number of a point)	(Total score)
(Name of a third player)	(Number of a point)	(Number of a point)	(Number of a point)	(total score)

Weekdays Table (remastered. orange removed. Round JumbleBee removed. From September 16, 2014 – February 6, 2015):

Player	To Bee Continued	BeeDeoke	Total score
(Name of a first player)	(Number of a point)	(Number of a point)	(Total score)
(Name of a second player)	(Number of a point)	(Number of a point)	(Total score)
(Name of a third player)	(Number of a point)	(Number of a point)	(Total score)

==== 2 Beecome 1 ====
2 Beecome 1 was introduced in season 7. The remaining one player and the defending champion will have a face-off in this round. To determine who is going first, a toss-up is started. They are given clues about "anything and everything that is related to music." If a contestant give the correct singer or instrument, they will first. They're given five sets of songs, each set includes two song titles. This time, they will choose a song title. They are given the year, the singer and the song title they chose. If they are correct, they will have a point. Whoever has the most points wins and proceed to The Final Countdown. In the event of a tie, the champion always wins.

If the champion gives up their title as defending champion, the two remaining contestants will have a face-off, following the same rules. And if they are tied the tiebreaker will happen.

==== The Final Countdown ====
Mel Villena introduces this concluding round by announcing: "It's The Final Countdown!" (based on a song called "The Final Countdown" by hard rock band Europe).

The Champion will face a final/jackpot round to win the pot money. The hosts introduce 7 categories, each one has one song. They choose a category; they are given the year, the artist and the title from the category they chose. If they give the correct line, they have a point. If they have 3 points, they win the pot money (the pot money must begin at ₱200,000 if the winner the day before wins yesterday's pot money). If they are wrong, they are crossed out. If they have 2 crosses, the game is automatically over and they will win ₱20,000 on account of being a winner of 2 Beecome 1. If they did not win the pot money, the hosts will add ₱20,000 for the next day (e.g. If the pot money is ₱340,000, they will add ₱20,000 and the pot money for the next day is ₱360,000). It will increase and increase until they win the pot money. If the champion wins the pot money, it will begin again at ₱200,000 for the next day. From January 27, 2015, to February 6, 2015, when the season 7 ends, the pot money adds to ₱50,000 instead of ₱20,000 (e.g. If the pot money is ₱450,000, they will add ₱50,000 and the pot money for the next day is ₱500,000).

Previously, the winner of the main game faces off against the reigning champion. To determine who goes first, a toss-up is started. The host gives a name of an artist. The first player to buzz in first with the correct title of any of the said artist's songs will go first. They are given a song, the year, and the artist. Then, they will need to sing the correct lyrics just like the format in the To Bee Continued round. If they are correct, they win ₱30,000. If not, the opposing player will need to sing the correct lyrics of the same song to win the cash. If any player sings the correct lyrics, they will have the right to start the next song. If neither gets the right lyric, a toss-up is played again to determine who will start the next song. Seven songs are played. Whoever gets the most money becomes champion, however, if a player can correctly guess the lyrics from four songs, they will automatically win the jackpot prize. In the event of a tie, the champion always wins. It was revised due to BeeKada Edition select 2 of the three members of the group. If the champion gives up their title as defending champion, the two remaining contestants will have a face-off, following the same rules. And if they are tied the tiebreaker will happen.

1 correct answer = P20,000

2 correct answers = P40,000

3 correct answers = P100,000 (from mon-thu) & P60,000

4 correct answers = P1,000,000

5 categories (mon-thu, P100,000)

Name of player	Category	Name of player
Symbol	Topic	Symbol
Symbol	Topic	Symbol
Symbol	Topic	Symbol
Symbol	Topic	Symbol
Symbol	Topic	Symbol

7 categories (1 million)

Name of player	Category	Name of player
Symbol	Topic	Symbol
Symbol	Topic	Symbol
Symbol	Topic	Symbol
Symbol	Topic	Symbol
Symbol	Topic	Symbol
Symbol	Topic	Symbol
Symbol	Topic	Symbol

==== Manuhan (quiz bee) ====
Each player has to guess a song by the artist that the host mentions (from May–September 2008 & November 16, 2013-February 22, 2014)/the song's artist (from October 2008-September 2009)/the lyrics' songs (from October 2009-February 2010), and the artist with clues and initials (from February 2014 to February 2015), though anything else, as long as it is related to the music scene could be identified in season 7.

=== Discontinued segments ===
==== JumbleBee ====
While the band is performing, words of a next line are shown scrambled on a screen. The contestant is required to sing the line in its correct order. Each correct line is worth two points that are accumulated for the final round.

During season one, four contestants were divided into two head-to-head duos and the winners of the duos go on to the Chorus Showdown Round. During season two, the four contestants solely completed for the next round's three spots.

==== To Bee Corrected ====
The host would provide the year the song was released, the performer, and the title of the song. A portion of the song is performed and wrong line is sung at the end, and then the contestant has to attempt to correct the wrong line of the song. If correct, they advance to the next round, and a new song is introduced, which the next contestant in line must attempt; if not, they have to step back, and the next person in line tries the same song. A song is thrown out if none of the remaining contestants get the line correct. The first four people who get a song line correct move on to the second round.

==== Pics Bee with You ====
Contestants are shown pictures as clues use pictogram to the line they are supposed to sing.

==== Singing with the Enemy ====
Only one song is sung during the whole round and all the contestants take turns in singing parts the song continuously. A correct lyric is equal to one point and the song continues to the next contestant. If a contestant is wrong they lose the chance to gain a point. The player with the fewest points in the end of the round is eliminated and the 2 remaining contestants move on to the Beedeoke round. However, on BeeKada Edition to eliminate 2 groups (1 group will eliminated if in case of vacancy of the defending champion) then proceed to the Final Countdown.

==== Showdown ====
This follows a similar format to the first round, but instead of singing a line, the contestant is required to sing the entire chorus without mistakes from the song performed. If both are correct or incorrect (sometimes after two rounds), then they go to a tiebreaker, where they are given the year and the name of the performer and the first person to buzz in will be given the option of playing that round or passing it to the other player. If the singer is correct, he/she win. Otherwise the other contestant wins.

The winner moves on to the "Final Countdown".

== House singers ==
Since the show's inception, house singers provide the main vocals of the songs throughout the show. By the end of season two, the main house singers were referred to as the "Songbees". As of season six, none of the original Songbees remain. Five finalists from season one of The Voice of the Philippines are the current Songbees including Isabella Fabregas, Jessica Reynoso, Penelope Matanguihan, Maki Ricafort and Yuki Ito. As of January 4, 2014 episode, another The Voice of the Philippines finalist, Stan Perfecto, joined the sixth Songbees and on January 11, 2014, another one of The Voice of the Philippines finalist, Dan Billano joined the seventh Songbees. In September 2014, Isabella Fabregas left the show to join the band "Victory Worship".

=== Final ===
- Jessica Reynoso (from The Voice of the Philippines; Team apl)
- Penelope Matanguihan (from The Voice of the Philippines; Team apl)
- Maki Ricafort (from The Voice of the Philippines; Team Sarah)
- Stan Perfecto (from The Voice of the Philippines; Team apl)
- Dan Billano (from The Voice of the Philippines; Team Bamboo)
- Paolo Onesa (from The Voice of the Philippines; Team Bamboo)
- Janice Javier (from The Voice of the Philippines; Team apl)

=== Past ===
- Apple Chiu (from Philippine Idol)
- Frenchie Dy (Champion of Star in a Million Season 2; Celebrity Player in Season 6 with KZ Tandingan)
- Michael Cruz (from Star in a Million Season 2)
- Led Sobrepeña III
- MC Castro (from SAIA Band formerly known as Metafour)
- OJ Mariano (from Star in a Million Season 2)
- Ivy Joy Maniquiz (from Born Diva)
- Sheng Belmonte (from Pinoy Dream Academy Season 2) (Guest Singer)
- Sheryl Kao
- Jason Torreda
- Ken Dingle (from Philippine Idol)
- Thirdy Casas (from Freshmen Boyband)
- Arms Cruz (from Philippine Idol)
- Hannah Pesy
- Isabella Fabregas (The Voice of the Philippines; Team Bamboo)
- Yuki Ito (The Voice of the Philippines; Team Sarah)

=== Guest singers ===
==== Season 1 ====
- Chad Peralta (from Pinoy Dream Academy)
- Gary Valenciano
- Pepe Smith
- Rico J. Puno
- Sheryn Regis
- Rachel Alejandro
- Aiza Seguerra
- Andrew E.

==== Season 2 ====
- Sarah Geronimo (October 11, 2008)
- Sam Milby (October 12, 2008)
- Sheryn Regis (November 23, 2008)
- Arnel Pineda (January 4, 2009)
- Rachelle Ann Go (January 11, 2009)
- Gary Valenciano (February 8, 2009)
- Mark Bautista (February 22, 2009)
- Guji Lorenzana and Janelle Jamer (February 28 & March 1, 2009)
- Manilyn Reynes, Rachel Alejandro, and Aiza Seguerra (April 19, 2009)

==== Season 3–4 ====
- Sheryn Regis (May 2, 2009)
- Sheryn Regis and Jed Madela (May 3, 2009)
- Nikki Gil (May 16 and 17, 2009)
- Zsa Zsa Padilla (June 27, 2009)
- Billy Crawford (June 28, 2009)
- Erik Santos (July 26, 2009)
- APO Hiking Society (September 19, 2009)
- Christian Bautista (September 26, 2009)

==== Season 5 ====
- Rachelle Ann Go and Jed Madela (October 3, 2009 & October 10, 2009)

== Special episodes ==
Some episodes of the show have been considered as "Special Episodes" having different themes and contestants based on the category given.

- Filipino Songs
- Jukebox
- Movie Themes (July 21, 2008)
- Little Big Star and Little Big Superstar contestants (July 24, 2008) — Rhap Salazar as Defending Champion
- Radio Disc Jockeys (July 25, 2008) — Rnold Rey as Challenger
- Pageant Queens (July 26, 2008)
- Special Week-Long Birthday Celebration of Buboy (July 28 - August 1, 2008)
- Comedians (July 29, 2008)
- Pinoy Rock (August 1, 2008)
- Retro (August 4, 2008)
- Girl Power
- Boys Will Be Boys
- Duets (August 20, 2008)
- The Singing Bayan (August 25, 2008)
- Welcome to the Jungle (August 29, 2008)
- Bee Can Dance (September 1, 2008)
- Hapunan (September 2, 2008)
- Novelty (September 3, 2008)
- Name Game (September 4, 2008)
- Pinoy Dream Academy (season 2) Top 6 Scholars (September 5, 2008) — Liezel Garcia as Challenger
- It's The BEE World After All (October 26, 2008)
- Bee Afraid, Bee Very Afraid (November 1, 2008)
- Makulay ang Beehive (November 22, 2008)
- Araw, Bee-tuin, Buwan (November 29, 2008)
- A Bee-ry Merry Christmas (December 21, 2008)
- 'Di lang pang-Artista, pang-BEErit pa (December 28, 2008)
- BEE to the 80's (January 24, 2009)
- Pasko ng Pagka-BEE (April 12, 2009)
- BEES Like It Hot (April 18, 2009)
- Happy 1st Anni-BEE (April 19, 2009) — First Anniversary episode
- Green BEES Movement (May 2, 2009)
- Ha-BEE Mother's Day (May 10, 2009)
- Malayang BEE Yan (June 13, 2009) — Philippine Independence Day episode
- Bee to School (June 14, 2009)
- Haligi ng Kantahan (June 21, 2009)
- Kasal, Kasali, Kantahan (June 27, 2009)
- Just BEE it (July 4, 2009) — Michael Jackson Tribute episode
- Happy Birthday, Buboy! (August 1 & 2, 2009)
- We'll Bee Missing You! (August 15, 2009) - Cory Aquino Tribute episode
- BEE-bong Boy Band (August 29, 2009)
- Crazy for BEE (August 30, 2009) - Madonna Episode
- BEELIB sa New Wave (September 5, 2009)
- TWO BEECOME ONE (September 12, 2009)
- BEEyaheng Langit (September 20, 2009)
- Royal BEE (September 26, 2009)
- GaBEE ng Lagim (October 31, 2009) — Halloween episode
- BEE Wish You a Merry Christmas (December 19, 2009) — Christmas episode
- Let's BEEgin 2010 (January 2, 2010) - New Year episode
- Bagong Taon, Bagong Beehive (January 9, 2010) — Post-New Year episode
- Beauty and the BEES (January 16, 2010)
- BeeFF (January 23, 2010)
- Boses ng Pinoy (January 30, 2010)
- 'Til We Bee Again (February 6, 2010)
- Maligayang Pasko! (December 21, 2013) Bea Santiago as Challenger
- Kung Hei Fat Choy (February 1, 2014) — Richard Poon and Manuel Chua as Challengers
- A BEElion Thanks (February 6, 2015) — Frenchie Dy as Challenger

== List of winners ==
Aiza Seguerra, on July 8, 2008, became a champion of The Singing Bee twice, but after her second win of the PHP1,000,000 jackpot, she gave up her throne to give chance for others. The same thing happened to Rachel Alejandro, where she gave up her throne as defending champion. She defeated her co-contestant singer Bituin Escalante."

Marlo Mortel on September 26, 2014, became a champion of The Singing Bee six times, but due to prior commitments such as the filming of Be Careful with My Heart (that he has to finish for the finale starting Oct-Nov 2014), and for the upcoming show called Oh My G!, Mortel, suddenly withdraws on October 3, 2014, he also mentioned on Instagram.

1/2 Million Winners
Show Date	Winner	Total Prize	Players	Season
May 19, 2008	Stephen Norries "Steno" Padilla	P1,140,000	Text Player	1
July 2, 2008	Rachel Alejandro	P1,340,000	Celebrity Player	1
July 8 & 9, 2008	Aiza Seguerra	P2,080,000	Celebrity Player	1
October 18, 2008	Manilyn Reynes	P1,030,000	Celebrity Player	2
January 17, 2009	Jestoni Alarcon, Janus del Prado, & Jason Abalos (Team Pieta)	P2,110,000	Celebrity Player	2
October 10, 2009	Team X-Mhin	P2,110,000	Celebrity Player	5
December 7, 2013	Sheryl Cruz	P1,000,000	Celebrity Player	6
January 11, 2014	KZ Tandingan	P1,000,000	Celebrity Player	6
July 1, 2014	Bodie Cruz	P1,040,000	Celebrity Player	6
August 18, 2014	Frenchie Dy	P1,000,000	Celebrity Player	6
January 27, 2015	Jolina Magdangal	P1,090,000	Celebrity Player	7

Pot Money Winners
Show Date	Winner	Total Prize
September 30, 2014	Marlo Mortel	400,000
October 9, 2014	Maxene Magalona	320,000
October 14, 2014	Kitkat	240,000
October 24, 2014	Kaiser Boado	420,000
December 15, 2014	Mitoy Yonting	900,000

== Seasons ==
Season	Episodes	Originally released	
Season	Episodes	First released	Last released
1	105	April 21, 2008	September 5, 2008
2	20	October 11, 2008	December 27, 2008
3	32	December 28, 2008	April 19, 2009
4	46	April 25, 2009	September 26, 2009
5	19	October 3, 2009	February 6, 2010
6	69	November 16, 2013	August 29, 2014
7	42	September 16, 2014	February 6, 2015

== Reception ==
The Singing Bee is consistently topping TV ratings on its timeslot. In the year ender NUTAM TV ratings results of AGB Nielsen Philippines last 2008, it ranked 6th in the Top Weekday Primetime Programs with 33.2%, and 5th in the Top Weekend Primetime Programs with 26.4%. In Kantar Media Philippines, it hit an all-time high rating of 32.7% on July 26, 2009.
