= Philippine Idol: The Final 12 =

Compilation album by Various Artist
- Released: 2006
- Recorded: 2006
- Genre: OPM
- Length: 53:30
- Label: Musiko Records & Sony BMG Music Entertainment (Philippines), Inc.

Philippine Idol: The Final 12 is a compilation album from the talent show Philippine Idol, an Idol franchise in the Philippines. It was released by Musiko Records & Sony BMG Music Entertainment (Philippines), Inc. in the Philippines in 2006. The album consists of 13 tracks and performed by the top 12 contestants of the reality TV show.

== Track listing ==
1. "Hang On" – 04:27 (performed by Drae Ybanez)
2. "Pangako" – 04:42 (performed by Stef Lazaro)
3. "Nakapagtataka" – 04:57 (originally by the Apo Hiking Society; performed by Pow Chavez)
4. "Himala" – 04:22 (originally by Rivermaya; performed by Gian Magdangal)
5. "Ngayon" – 05:46 (performed by Apple Chiu)
6. "Iisa Pa Lamang" – 04:12 (performed by Jeli Mateo)
7. "Tuwing Umuulan at Kapiling Ka" – 04:27 (originally by Basil Valdez, Regine Velasquez and Eraserheads; performed by Jan Nieto)
8. "Araw Araw, Gabi Gabi" – 03:17 (performed by Armarie Cruz)
9. "Hindi Magbabago" – 04:34 (performed by Remond Sajor)
10. "Di Na Natuto" – 05:06 (originally by the Apo Hiking Society; performed by Ken Dingle)
11. "Minsan Lang Kitang Iibigin" – 03:44 (originally by Ariel Rivera and Regine Velasquez; performed by Maureen Marcelo)
12. "Next in Line" – 03:45 (originally by AfterImage; performed by Miguel Mendoza)
13. "Kaleidoscope World" – 04:11 (originally by Francis Magalona; performed by The Final 12)
