= Magdangal =

Magdangal (Tagalog pronunciation: [mɐgdɐˈŋal]) is a surname. Notable people with the surname include:

- Gian Magdangal (born 1981), Filipino singer and actor
- Jolina Magdangal (born 1978), Filipino singer, actress, television presenter, and entrepreneur, cousin of Gian
