= Sophia Montecarlo =

Filipino musician

- Also known as: Sophia, Swirtty, Trinity's Songbird, The Dazzling Diva
- Born: Swirtty Mae Nibley; March 1, 1986 (age 40); Malate, Manila, Philippines
- Genres: Pop, Latin, Alternative
- Occupations: Singer; Actress
- Instruments: Vocals
- Years active: 2004–present
- Labels: Star Records (2004–2005); Vocal Sync (2011–2012)
- Website: sophiamontecarlo.com

Swirtty Mae Nibley is better known by her screen name Sophia Montecarlo is a Filipina singer. She used to be a contestant on the reality television show Born Diva. She represented Philippines and won several gold and silver medals for the World Championship of Performing Arts in 2010. Winner of Kumoricon Idol in November 2019. Due to pandemic she holds the title of Kumoricon Idol title for 2 years in a row.

== Early life ==
Swirtty was born in Echelon Tower Malate, Manila to Aladino and Melinda Nibley and lived most of her life in Quezon City. Nibley is the only child of Aladino and Melinda. She has a very diverse background, her family hails from a multiracial clan, she's half Filipino, part Japanese, Vietnamese, Scottish, Spanish, and White American. Her grandfather is Scottish-American and her grandmother is Filipino, Spanish and Vietnamese. She was raised as a Roman Catholic. Her father was such a big fan of Vilma Santos that he named his only child after the star mayor's son Luis Manzano (also known as Lucky Manzano); she was baptized Swirtty Mae Nibley. Her father must have been totally star-struck as he trained his daughter to sing, starting at age 3. Swirtty's parents separated when she was three, however, they remained on good terms, after which she was raised by her father and grandfather.

During her childhood, Swirtty performed at Manila Hotel, Manila Pavilion and Holiday Inn Manila. While at Trinity High School, she was a Rotary Club member. When Nibley was in high school, she and her father Aladino traveled to Tutuban Center every Tuesday and Thursday. She was cast in CU@E ETV39. She joined the television series until its cancellation in 2001. She graduated from Trinity High School in 2003.

The youngest and the 6th grand finalist of the Born Diva TV series, said she could sing as many as 20 songs every day when she reached her teens. She pursued her college at Trinity University of Asia and finish Mass Communication major in Broadcast Journalism. While studying she also worked part-time at Trinity as a student assistant.

== Personal life and career ==
Personal life

- She started singing at the age of 3.
- She joined and won several contests. Her first television debut on Eat Bulaga!, a hit noontime variety show in Philippines, happened when she was just eleven.
- She has a whistle register (only heard in rare recordings and outtakes).
- She auditioned for Star Circle Quest, Star in a Million and The X Factor Philippines.
- She was voted off in Born Diva on the third round even she got the highest votes through text and internet.
- 3 days Champion in Magandang Tanghali Bayan Bidaoke
- Goddaughter of Jograd Dela Torre and Aga Muhlach
- Sophia, Kontin Roque and Ahron Villena attended and graduated from the same school in March 2010 Trinity University of Asia School in Quezon City, a middle competency university, with fellow actors Megan Young, Alfred Navarro, Che Tolentino, Charles Christianson, Bryan Termulo, Kris Bernal. Sugar Mercado, Erich Gonzales, Alvin Aragon, Eslove Briones, Shey Bustamante, Joe Vargas and Marco Aytona.

Senator Manny Pacquiao, Hon. Banal, Jorge "Bolet, Hon. Belmonte, Feliciano Jr. R. and other Congressmen recognize and congratulate Swirtty in The Sandiganbayan; a special appellate collegial court in the Philippines. On occasion when she brought home awards from WCOPA.

== Born Diva performances ==
- Audition – September 21, 2004. Sophia sang "Love Takes Time" by Mariah Carey, and "Bukas Na Lang Kita Mamahalin" by Lani Misalucha.
- Born Diva's group performance – Zsa Zsa Padilla sang with Sophia Montecarlo and Leila Vargas and they chose the song "Luha" by Aegis.
- Sophia Montecarlo and Zsa Zsa Padilla's duet – Unleashed the Diva
- Born Diva's group performances – Point of No Return, Bring Me to Life, Waiting for Tonight, Le Freak.

| Week # | Song choice | Original artist | Result |
| Top 16 | "Halik" | Aegis | Safe |
| Top 8 | "Reason to go on" | Sophia Montecarlo | Safe |
| Top 7 | "Love Takes Time" | Mariah Carey | Safe |
| Top 6 | "Objection (Tango)" | Shakira | Eliminated |
| Grand Final | "The Journey" | Lea Salonga | Guest |

== Discography ==
=== Album ===
- Born Diva
  - Reason To Go On by: Vehnee Saturno
  - Released: December 20, 2005 (U.S.)

=== Single release ===
"Find Me"

- Find Me by: Jonbudz Rocio
- Released:
  June 1, 2011 (U.S.)

"Sophia Montecarlo"
A sample of the "Find Me" bridge and the last chorus of the song's ending

== World Championship of Performing Arts ==
In 2010 Sophia was chosen as one of the representatives of the Philippine Team for the World Championship of Performing Arts (WCOPA), where she competed for the senior division. Her awards are as follows:

- SILVER – Female Vocal Contemporary – 18–24
- SILVER – Female Vocal Latin – 18–24
- SILVER – Female Vocal Open – 18–24
- BRONZE – Female Vocal Rock – 18–24

== Charity work ==
In December 2011, Nibley performed with De La Salle University students and donated the pledge money they collected to the Benefit of Sendong survivors. She is active in helping with a non-profit organization for seniors and people with disabilities by providing an affordable, personal, volunteer-based grocery shopping.

| Year | Title | Venue | Country |
|---|---|---|---|
| 2011 | Bb. Caloocan (Judge) | Caloocan City | Philippines |
| 2011 | Find Me Single Released | DWIZ | Philippines |
| 2012 | Rachell Allen (Guest) with Miguel Mendoza | Quezon City | Philippines |
| 2012 | New You Magazine Special Featured | Metro Manila | Philippines |
| 2014–2017 | FrightTown | Moda Center | United States |
| 2016 | El Grito De Independencia | Moda Center | United States |
| 2016 | 82nd Avenue of Roses | Eastport Plaza | United States |
| 2015–present | Jade International Night Market | Jade District | United States |

== Awards ==
- 2000 – Manila News Star Ang Sandigan Ng Bayan : The Outstanding Performer of the Year
- 2004 – Dazzling Diva of ABS-CBN Born Diva
- 2009 – Studio 23 Myx Why Men Love Whisper : Top 3 Best Photo story for the month of April & Top 2 grandfinalist
- 2010 – WCOPA (World Championships of Performing Arts) Medalist
- 2010 – Featured Global Pinoy on The Filipino Channel of ABS-CBN
- 2010 – Filipino-American Vocal Arts Online Music : Best Rock Solo Vocalist
- 2010 – Trinity University of Asia – Most Outstanding Student in Cultural and Performing Arts
- 2013 – 50th Founding Anniversary Trinity University of Asia : Special Citation
- 2014 – 10th Anniversary Fright Town : Special Citation
- 2016 – Trio Club : 2nd runner up
- 2019 – Kumoricon Idol : Champion
- 2021 – Store to Door June Volunteer Spotlight

== Filmography ==
=== Television and Shows ===
| Year | Title | Role | Notes |
|---|---|---|---|
| 1997 | Birit Baby | Herself | Credited as Swirtty Mae Nibley |
| 1999–2001 | CU@E ETV 39 | Santina | |
| 2004 | MTV Supahstar | Herself | Credited as Swirtty Mae Nibley |
| 2004 | All Star K! | Herself | Credited as Swirtty Mae Nibley |
| 2004 | Born Diva | Herself | Credited as Sophia Montecarlo |
| 2004 | Breakfast (TV series) | Herself | Credited as Sophia Montecarlo |
| 2004 | Homeboy (TV show) | Herself | Credited as Sophia Montecarlo |
| 2004 | Magandang Tanghali Bayan | Herself | Credited as Sophia Montecarlo |
| 2005 | Chowtime Na! | Herself | Credited as Sophia Montecarlo |
| 2005 | Wowowee | Herself | Credited as Sophia Montecarlo |
| 2004–2005 | ASAP Mania | Herself | Credited as Sophia Montecarlo |
| 2010 | Walang Tulugan with the Master Showman | Herself | Credited as Swirtty Mae Nibley |
| 2011 | Why Men Love Whisper | Herself | Credited as Swirtty Mae Nibley |
| 2011 | The Filipino Channel | Herself | Credited as Swirtty Mae Nibley |
| 2012 | Wil Time Bigtime | Herself | Credited as Swirtty Mae Nibley |

=== Movies ===
| Year | Title | Role | Director |
|---|---|---|---|
| 2016 | Best Fake Friends | Club Girl | Paul Kampf |
| 2017 | Zombie Day Apocalypse | Fleeing Citizen | George C. Romero |
| 2018 | Interconnect | Woman in Bar | Nivi Singh |
| 2019 | The Quiet Crowd | Art Critic | David Hayden |
| 2020 | Inspiration Road | Churchgoer | Rob Nelson |
