= Mel Villena =

- Villena in 2026

Background information
- Origin: Manila, Philippines
- Genres: OPM, pop, r&b, classical, gospel, adult-contemporary
- Occupations: Composer, songwriter, lyricist, arranger, record producer
- Instruments: Piano, keyboards, synthesizers, analog synthesizers, baritone sax, clarinet
- Years active: 1980–present

Mel Villena is a Filipino musician, composer and musical director who has worked with various artists such as Sharon Cuneta, Pops Fernandez, Martin Nievera, Lea Salonga, The Company, and Mitch Valdez. He was also the musical director of Associated Broadcasting Company's (ABC) Philippine Idol.

Aside from Philippine Idol, he appeared in numerous reality talent shows such as ABS-CBN's Star in a Million and guested on children's television series Batibot, in which he arranged the show's theme song. During his high school days, he was a member of the Kundirana choir of the La Salle Greenhills school.

He got his education at the University of the Philippines College of Music and refined his skills along its halls.

== Notes ==
- He is the conductor of the Bandble Bee in The Singing Bee.
- He was also the musical director of Coca-Cola Ride To Fame on GMA-7 in 2007.
