= Philippine Idol =

2006 Filipino reality television series

- Logo
- Genre: Reality competition
- Created by: Simon Fuller
- Based on: Pop Idol
- Directed by: Rich Ilustre; Mark Reyes
- Presented by: Ryan Agoncillo
- Starring: Heart Evangelista; Mel Villena
- Judges: Ryan Cayabyab; Pilita Corrales; Francis Magalona
- Country of origin: Philippines
- Original language: Filipino
- No. of episodes: 34

Production
- Executive producer: Perci Intalan
- Production locations: SM Megamall Cinema 3, Mandaluyong; Araneta Coliseum, Quezon City
- Running time: Varies
- Production companies: FremantleMedia; 19 Entertainment; CKX, Inc.

Original release
- Network: ABC
- Release: July 30 – December 10, 2006

Related
- Idol Philippines (2019, 2022); Pinoy Idol (2008)

Philippine Idol is a Philippine television interactive reality competition show broadcast by ABC (now TV5). Created and developed by FremantleMedia and 19 Entertainment, the program is a franchise of Pop Idol created by British entertainment executive Simon Fuller. Hosted Ryan Agoncillo, Ryan Cayabyab (musical composer), Pilita Corrales (singer, known as Asia's Queen of Songs) and Francis Magalona (rapper and producer) were also judges of the show, it aired from July 30 to December 10, 2006. Meanwhile, actress Heart Evangelista hosted the daily updates program I ♥ Philippine Idol: Exclusive. Composer Mel Villena was the show's musical director.

Mau Marcelo, an aspiring singer from Lucena City, defeated two other contenders on the show's finale to become the first Philippine Idol. FremantleMedia subsequently awarded the franchise to GMA Network and their version of the program was named Pinoy Idol, which does not recognize the results of ABC's franchise.

== Production ==
ABC started negotiating with FremantleMedia in order to acquire a Philippine franchise of Idol in 2004, when Filipino-American Jasmine Trias placed third in American Idol's third season. It reportedly cost millions of dollars. During the program's development stage, notable personalities in music and recording industries tried out to become Idol judges, including former Eraserheads vocalist Ely Buendia, singer-actress Pinky Marquez, and talent manager Wyngard Tracy. The chosen judges were addressed according to their agreed-upon nicknames: Cayabyab was called "Mr. C", Corrales called "Mamita", and Magalona, "Kiko".

Before it was launched, there was skepticism among the local entertainment press about Philippine Idol as singing contests are common in local television, with recent ones branded as Idol knockoffs. The Filipino culture of "westernized conservatism" was also noted, as Pinoys tend to shy away from direct criticism especially in front of cameras. Promotion began during the Finale of American Idol season 5. One of its taglines reads, "Hindi lang STAR, hindi lang SUPERSTAR, kundi PHILIPPINE IDOL" (Not just a STAR, not just a SUPERSTAR, but a PHILIPPINE IDOL). This was in reference to two singing contests being held during that time—Search for the Star in a Million on ABS-CBN and Pinoy Pop Superstar on GMA Network. Initially, the program was scheduled to begin on July 29, 2006, but ABC moved it to July 30, 2006. On its premiere, Philippine Idol registered a 7.7% rating according to an independent survey, in contrast to GMA Network's Mel and Joey at 21% and ABS-CBN's Rated K at 26.7%. ABC officials, however, were overwhelmed at the results, considering they were up against "giant networks". They also noted that ratings for Philippine Idol increased to as much as 12% towards the final 30 minutes of first episode.

Early reviews compared the show with American Idol, which was shown locally on ABC. Entertainment writers said that the local Idol franchise was not as glossy as its American counterpart, but it was able to succeed because of promising elements such as human interest, talent, and proper casting of judges and host. Meanwhile, reviews during the Finale were mixed, with Nestor Torre of the Philippine Daily Inquirer commenting that the Performance Show was phlegmatic and anticlimactic as the Final Three failed to rise up to the challenge and instead played safe, while Results Show was stretched out with one unspectacular number after another. He also noticed sound glitches, which he blamed on faulty equipment and lax personnel. In contrast, Billy Balbastro of Abante Tonite wrote that he was impressed with the show's "flow", song choices, pacing, and camera shots. He also noted that the Finale did not have melodrama and lingering shots for the sake of effects.

== Auditions ==
ABC's Philippine Idol judges (from left) Ryan Cayabyab, Francis Magalona, and Pilita Corrales, with host Ryan Agoncillo.

The main auditions were held in three cities, each representing a major island group: Pasay (advertised as Manila) for Luzon, on June 3, 2006, in Philippine International Convention Center; Davao for Mindanao, on June 23, 2006, in Waterfront Insular Hotel; and Cebu for Visayas, on July 4, 2006, in Bigfoot Entertainment's International Academy of Film and Television. Meanwhile, Fast-Track Screenings were also held in SM Supermalls located in Baguio, Lucena, Batangas, Iloilo, and Cagayan de Oro between May and June 2006. Screenings were also held in cities without an SM Mall such as Dagupan, Ilagan in Isabela, Tacloban, and Zamboanga. Applicants were asked to fill out necessary forms and perform two songs before a set of judges, usually from local radio and music industries. Successful applicants were given a pass for the Main Auditions. ABC and its media partners Radio Mindanao Network and Manila Broadcasting Company provided free transportation, food and lodging to those who were eligible for Theater Eliminations.

The Luzon Main Auditions and Fast-Tracks yielded over 10,000 registrants, with Contestant no. 0001 arriving at the audition venue at 1:00 a.m., auditions starting at 9:00 a.m. The Main Auditions were composed of three stages—passing the first two stages gave the participant a blue form, allowing them to face the Idol judges about a week later. The Idol judges were so overwhelmed with the amount of talent presented to them that it was difficult for them to say "no" to hopefuls who did not pass their standards. Cayabyab exasperatedly stated during the Luzon Main Auditions,

I thought I was tough enough...no. [I] got so emotionally drained having to say no to all the pleading [and the] crying... This is not fun anymore. [It was] torture.

He admitted becoming angry at times and felt like he was the anti-hero because of intense reactions from rejects who viewed the competition as a ticket out of poverty. The judges even allowed candidates to sing up to five "redemption songs" after saying "no" for the first time. After seeing the auditions, FremantleMedia supervising producer Sheldon Bailey said that she was amazed at the abundance of musical talent in the Philippines as well as the amount of touching human stories.

== Theater round ==
The Theater Round was held between August 1 and 3, 2006, at the Cultural Center of the Philippines. A total of 169 competitors received the Gold Pass from the three main judges, 119 from Luzon and Metro Manila, 17 from Davao, and 33 from Cebu. However, only 157 showed up for the Theater Round as other Gold Passers either backed out or were allegedly "pirated" to join rival talent search Pinoy Dream Academy. They were billeted at the Bayview Park Hotel, where Gold Passers from outside Luzon arrived after a first-class trip in Super Ferry, while the Luzon contenders were picked up in selected SM Malls. The contestants were divided into 11 groups with 15 members. Each contestant performed an a cappella, after which the judges selected who would go home and advance to the next round. From 157 contestants, 84 were chosen to proceed to the group performance, with each group having three members. The list was trimmed down further to 40 contestants, each of which sang solo with a piano accompaniment. Eventually the judges selected the 24 contestants who would compete in the Semi-Final Round. The Top 24 was officially announced on August 27, 2006.

== Semifinal round ==
The Semi-Finalists were then divided by gender, with the two groups performing alternately at SM Megamall Cinema 3 on a stage built specifically for the live shows. The viewers voted for their favorites by dialing a toll-free telephone number or sending an SMS as often as possible from the end of the show until 8:30 p.m. PHT the following day. The four contestants of each group who received the highest number of votes entered the Finals. Ten of the remaining 16 semi-finalists then performed in a Wildcard round, with four contestants with the highest number of votes completing the Top 12 Finalists. Candidates for the Wildcard were announced after the second Semi-Finals Results Show, although it was shown on television a day later in Philippine Idol: Exclusive.

== Final round ==
The Philippine Idol Final 12, as they appeared in an advertisement for the program.

The Final Round started on September 30, 2006, in which each finalist sang one to three songs within a specified theme and received comments from each of the judges. The viewers continued to vote for their favorites until 8:30 p.m. PHT the following day, which was shortened to two hours from the Fifth Finals Week. The finalist with the lowest number of votes was eliminated during the Results Show every week. However, there were special circumstances that did not result in eliminations during the Results Show, but then the votes were carried over the week after and eventually eliminated two finalists. The 12 Finalists also recorded a compilation album entitled Philippine Idol: The Final 12, consisting of Original Pilipino Music songs they have performed during the first Finals Week. The remaining three contenders, namely Gian Magdangal, Jan Nieto, and Mau Marcelo, competed in the Finale, instead of the usual two contestants in most Idol shows, held on December 9 and 10, 2006, at the Araneta Coliseum in Quezon City.

=== Weekly themes ===
- September 30 – OPM songs dedicated to a special someone
- October 7 – Soul/R&B
- October 14 – Songs from the Metropop Song Festival
- October 21 – Contemporary Filipino rock
- October 29 – Personal theme songs
- November 5 – Dance music
- November 12 – Radio hits
- November 19 – Movie themes, and Broadway show tunes
- November 26 – Big band
- December 9 – Personal choice, Judges' and Musical director's choice, and Record company's choice

=== Guest judges ===
A guest judge was enlisted each week for five weeks beginning on October 14 while resident judge Magalona was away on a tour in Europe. Additionally, a sixth guest judge supplemented the panel on the week of Magalona's return. Each guest judge generally had expertise relating to that week's theme.

- October 14 – Hajji Alejandro (interpreter of the first winning song of the Metropop Song Festival)
- October 21 – Wency Cornejo (songwriter and front man of AfterImage)
- October 29 – Luke Mejares (solo artist and former vocalist of South Border)
- November 5 – Regine Tolentino (professional dancer, former MTV VJ and TV personality)
- November 12 – Mo Twister (radio DJ and talk show host)
- November 19 – Lea Salonga (Tony Awards-winning singer and musical theatre performer)

=== Notable events ===
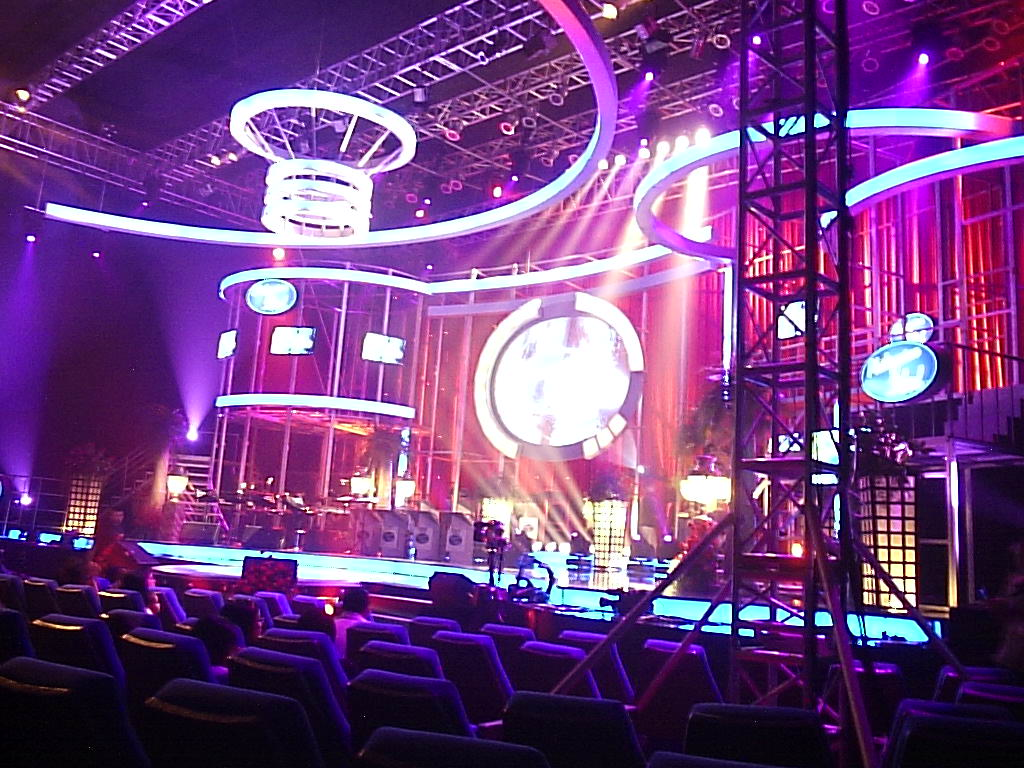
The Philippine Idol stage, which was set up on SM Megamall Cinema 3

On the first Finals Week, no contestants were eliminated due to disrupted telephone and mobile phone services in many areas of Luzon, caused by Typhoon Xangsane. In the results show, finalists still went through a familiar elimination routine. Agoncillo called three contestants to an area dubbed the "Hot Spot" before revealing that no one would be eliminated and the votes would be carried over to the succeeding week. This was done because there were no official results to be announced. According to sources from the network, the votes were not yet counted at the time. ABC-5 Director for Creative and Entertainment Production Perci Intalan stated that the three finalists who were put in the "Hot Spot" (Marcelo, Armarie Cruz and Jelli Mateo) were not necessarily the Bottom Three. Intalan said, "We were not allowed to announce who the Bottom Three were because the votes will be carried over next week and it might affect the voting if people knew who the Bottom Three were." As a result, two contenders—Stef Lazaro and Drae Ybañez—were eliminated the following week. Another non-elimination occurred on the fourth Finals Week due to reports of disrupted voting (among Sun Cellular and Smart subscribers). The votes amassed for this week were carried over to Week 5. Through the rest of the results night, each of the judges picked one finalist to give an encore performance: Cornejo picked Cruz, Corrales chose Marcelo, and Cayabyab picked Magdangal.

Schedules were changed starting the Fifth Finals Week, with performances held on Sundays while elimination nights were on Mondays, as opposed to the previous arrangement of Saturday performances and Sunday eliminations. The voting time was also shortened from 21 to 2 hours. Agoncillo explained that this change was adopted (partly due to public clamor) from the voting period of American Idol. Mateo and Cruz were eliminated because of the non-elimination on the previous week.

On the Seventh Finals Week, each finalist sang a song chosen for them by a fellow Idol based on these assigned pairings: Magdangal and Nieto, Marcelo and Mendoza, Chavez and Dingle. After the night's performances, guest judge Mo Twister confidently said that Dingle would be eliminated the next night and even wagered that he would go to work in a dress for a week if his prediction proved wrong. Dingle was indeed eliminated the following night. The Big Band Week became a "mini-concert", as each of the remaining four finalists performed two song numbers with a short spiel to the audience in between. The following week featured special segments about the final three contenders: Marcelo, Magdangal, and Nieto.

=== Finale ===
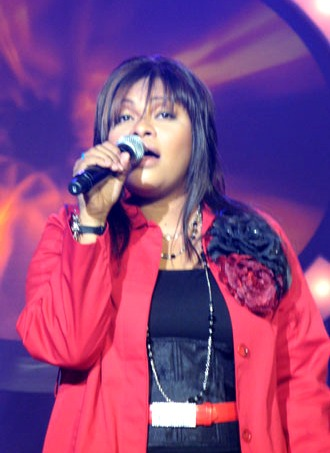
Mau Marcelo, winner of Philippine Idol.

Philippine Idol held its Performance Night Finale on December 9, 2006, at the Araneta Coliseum, which was dubbed The Big 3 at the Big Dome. Each of the three remaining contenders performed three songs, one personally chosen by the contestant, one by the judges and one by Sony BMG Music Philippines. Agoncillo hosted the performance night alone; he was joined the next night by Heart Evangelista. Each song was performed with Villena's "mega band" and the San Miguel Philharmonic Orchestra. The next night at the same venue, the star-studded results show was held, headlined by Magdangal, Marcelo, and Nieto together with the rest of the Final 12. The show also included performances from Cueshé, Aiza Seguerra, the SexBomb Girls, G. Toengi, Hajji Alejandro, and Gary Valenciano, as well as resident judges Francis Magalona and Pilita Corrales.Ryan Cayabyab also performed his compositions by joining the finalists through his piano accompaniment. In what can be regarded as the climax of the show, the Final 12 and resident judges Corrales and Cayabyab performed a medley of songs composed by Cayabyab, including an original one which he made with finalist Miguel Mendoza entitled "Here I Am".

Marcelo was voted as the first Philippine Idol, amassing about 35.26% of the vote. The vote was a hotly contested one with the runners-up earning about 33.84% and 30.90% of the votes. It was not revealed, however, which runner-up garnered which percentage, but they each received ₱250,000 (equivalent to ₱418,922 in 2021). Aside from the title, Marcelo also earned a contract with Sony BMG Music Philippines, a management contract with an agency of FremantleMedia's choice, a ₱1,000,000 (equivalent to ₱1,675,688 in 2021) non-exclusive contract with ABC, and ₱1,000,000 cash prize.

== Elimination chart ==
Did Not Perform	Females	Males	Top 24	Wild Card	Top 12	Runners-up	Winner

Safe	Hot Spot	Bottom Group	Eliminated

Stage:		Semi-Finals		Wild Card	Finals									Grand Finale
Week:		9/3	9/10	9/17	10/1^{1}	10/8^{2}	10/15	10/22^{3}	10/30^{4}	11/6	11/13	11/20	11/27	12/10
Place	Contestant	Result												
1	Mau Marcelo		Wild Card	Top 12	Spot		Bottom 3				Bottom 3		Spot	Winner
2–3	Gian Magdangal	Wild Card		Top 12		Bottom 4	Bottom 3							Runners-up
2–3	Jan Nieto	Top 12									Bottom 3	Bottom 3	Spot	Runners-up
4	Miguel Mendoza	Top 12										Bottom 3	Elim	Eliminated (Week 9)
5	Pow Chavez		Top 12			Bottom 4			Bottom 4	Bottom 3		Elim	Eliminated (Week 8)	
6	Kenneth Dingle	Wild Card		Top 12						Bottom 3	Elim	Eliminated (Week 7)		
7	Apple Chiu		Top 12						Bottom 4	Elim	Eliminated (Week 6)			
8–9	Armarie 'Arms' Cruz		Top 12		Spot				Elim	Eliminated (Week 5)				
8–9	Angelli 'Jeli' Mateo		Top 12		Spot				Elim	Eliminated (Week 5)				
10	Reymond Sajor	Top 12					Elim	Eliminated (Week 3)						
11–12	Drae Ybañez	Top 12				Elim	Eliminated (Week 2)							
11–12	Stef Lazaro		Wild Card	Top 12		Elim	Eliminated (Week 2)							
Wild; Card	Joseph Astor II	Wild Card		Elim	Eliminated (Wild Card)									
Wild; Card	Jasper Onyx Culala	Wild Card		Elim	Eliminated (Wild Card)									
Wild; Card	Ramirr Grepo	Wild Card		Elim	Eliminated (Wild Card)									
Wild; Card	Ira Patricia Marasigan		Wild Card	Elim	Eliminated (Wild Card)									
Wild; Card	Chrisitna "Ting" Otera		Wild Card	Elim	Eliminated (Wild Card)									
Wild; Card	Yasmin Rose "Suey" Medina		Wild Card	Elim	Eliminated (Wild Card)									
Semi- Final	Erika Jill "EJ" Bautista		Elim	Eliminated (Semi-Finals Group 2)										
Semi- Final	Abigail "Gail" Blanco		Elim	Eliminated (Semi-Finals Group 2)										
Semi- Final	Rina Lei "Ynah" Pangan		Elim	Eliminated (Semi-Finals Group 2)										
Semi- Final	Robert Bernadas	Elim	Eliminated (Semi Finals Group 1)											
Semi- Final	Freddie Cabael, Jr.	Elim	Eliminated (Semi Finals Group 1)											
Semi- Final	Christian Masaga	Elim	Eliminated (Semi Finals Group 1)											

^{1} Due to the power interruptions and network problems, no elimination was held on October 1. All votes cast for the week were carried over to the following week.
^{2} Two contestants were eliminated this week in lieu of the non-elimination the week before.
^{3} Due to network problems, no contestant was eliminated. All votes cast for the week were carried over to the following week. This serves as Philippine Idol's Second Non-elimination week.
^{4} Two contestants were eliminated this week in lieu of the non=elimination the week before. This also marks the first Monday elimination, as performance nights were moved to Sundays, with eliminations moved to Mondays.

== Kakaibang Idol ==
Kakaibang Idol was a special episode of Philippine Idol held on September 23, 2006, a week after the Top 12 Finalists have been named. It was an interactive reality singing competition consisting of notable auditionees who either did not pass or failed to make it through Semifinals. The program was named Kakaibang Idol (A Different Kind of Idol) because the seven contestants made an impact among viewers. The twelve finalists were present that night, but only performed at the beginning and end of the show. Likewise, Magalona, Corrales, and Cayabyab took a back seat, appearing in clips taking their "times off". Taking over jury duties that night were comedic performers Ethel Booba, Arnell Ignacio, and Tuesday Vargas. Although the event served as a breather, voting was still active, involving viewers picking the performer who should be proclaimed Kakaibang Idol. The next night, with finalists and judges present, Kenneth Paul "Yova" Alonzo—a transgender call center agent from Cebu City—was chosen by viewers as Kakaibang Idol.

== I ♥ Philippine Idol: Exclusive ==
I ♥ Philippine Idol: Exclusive, originally Philippine Idol: Exclusive, is a thirty-minute daily program that features updates, news and behind-the-scene footages of the show. Since its premiere on August 14, 2006, a male voice talent (who also voices the plugs for ABC programs) has been facilitating the program, with appearances by Jmie Mempin who is also a production associate of Philippine Idol. Actress Heart Evangelista took over on September 4, 2006. Accordingly, Philippine Idol: Exclusive was renamed I Love Philippine Idol: Exclusive with a heart shape reflecting the new host.

== Controversies ==
=== Auditions ===
A Fast-Track audition that was to be held at SM City Sta. Mesa was canceled, leading to complaints from hopefuls and their parents. After hours of waiting, a representative of ABC arrived and relocated each of the 160 frustrated applicants to other scheduled screening. Meanwhile, Filipinos living in Mindanao reacted negatively to what Philippine Idol judges said after a low Gold Pass turnout at the Davao Main Auditions, with Corrales (a Cebuana herself) saying that "Davao is not the place to look for an Idol" and "all the good ones are in Cebu". Corrales later clarified in the Wildcard Round that she said such a statement because of the low turnout in the Davao auditions and the even lower Gold Pass output. She added that "Davao's best talents" might have probably auditioned earlier in Manila.

=== Talent piracy ===
ABC confirmed that a Gold Passer (later identified in the show's official website as Czarina Rose Rosales) was pirated by ABS-CBN's Pinoy Dream Academy, the Philippine franchise of Star Academy. Sources said that representatives of ABS-CBN even approached a judge to "just let (some of) the contestants go". This came after news that ABS-CBN wanted to co-produce Philippine Idol with ABC, but was denied. ABS-CBN sent a letter to the Philippine Daily Inquirer, which published the said report denying the allegations. The network added that they successfully staged competitions without taking contestants from other contests and would fully respect a contestant's choice as to which competition they would join. Auditions for Pinoy Dream Academy were being held before the Theater eliminations. ABC then sent a formal letter of complaint to ABS-CBN, alleging that three Gold Passers of Philippine Idol became contestants of Pinoy Dream Academy. The latter did not comment on the letter, as neither of the three talents questioned became a finalist of that show.

=== Vote padding ===
Upon the announcement of the first four male finalists, there were viewers of the show who had negative reactions regarding its format. They were shocked, disappointed, and were left complaining as two of the contestants that were favored by the judges based on their performances failed to make the cut. Instead, two others who had rather bad reviews from the jurors took the spots. Viewers critical to the program concluded that it was just another "popularity contest" rather than a singing competition. Cayabyab mentioned that people should not be complacent regarding the contestants' status on the show, and advised them to keep on voting for their favorites because of the show's uncertainty. This criticism was also reflected during the Women's Semi-finals, as talent critics believed two contenders that failed to make the cut should have become finalists. Critics also noted that viewers did not take heed to the judges' remarks about performance. Torre stated in his article that the results of Philippine Idol Semi-finals revealed that viewers were not yet knowledgeable or objective enough to pick the first Idol, and pointed to the compromised voting based on "subjective campaigns" from some of the semi-finalists' backers. He later commented that the show did not affirm a contestant's popularity but "the determination and deep pockets of his supporters." This was supported on a report published by the Manila Bulletin about contestants who "buy their way to the top". Cayabyab divulged that he did not expect the way people voted and would see if that trend would continue in the coming weeks. However, he admitted that such campaigns were part of the game.

=== Looks over talent ===
During the Results Show of the Wildcard Round, Marcelo jokingly said that Philippine Idol is not a singing contest but a "pagandahan" (beauty contest), which received a thunderous applause and laughter (especially from Cayabyab). Her statement was interpreted in two ways: as a way of venting out her frustrations in the voting process or as a means of sarcasm. She later made it to the Finals. In a later interview in I ♥ Philippine Idol: Exclusive, she said that she did not mean anything. Marcelo later apologized for her remarks during the Finale's post-results show press conference. The judges were also scored by viewers for their constant comments about contestants who should lose weight, especially Marcelo. Marcelo admitted getting hurt by comments on so-called physical flaws, adding that she entered a "singing contest" not a "dancing competition". Cayabyab said that he avoids commenting on the singer's physical attributes.

=== Cayabyab losing cool ===
Cayabyab had shown signs of frustration during Results Shows where the best performers of the previous night got eliminated. He finally expressed his disgust over the results after Sajor's elimination, calling it "dreadful". He also appeared to have surrendered the prospect of finding the best singer in the contest, predicting that it would be a "lightweight competition" with contestants singing nursery rhymes.

== Fate of Idol in the Philippines ==
=== Transition to Pinoy Idol ===
Although it had previously announced that it would, ABC did not produce a second season of Philippine Idol' Sources stated that ABC had incurred large losses producing the first season due to lower than expected advertising revenue.

On September 16, 2007, FremantleMedia officially announced that the Idol franchise would be given to GMA Network under the name Pinoy Idol. FremantleMedia representative Geraldine Bravo said that it was "very fortunate" to find a new partner, while GMA Network's Senior Vice President for Entertainment Wilma Galvante added that both parties agreed that the network "has the experience, the resources, and the people to mount talent-search programs". Reports said that GMA was planning to treat Pinoy Idol as a completely different show, without referring to Philippine Idol as its "first season" and not recognizing Marcelo as the "first winner". Agoncillo and Cayabyab would not reprise their roles in the new Idol show as they appeared in the second season of Pinoy Dream Academy.

In an article published before Pinoy Idol's premiere, Torre gave the lapses in Philippine Idol which he hoped Pinoy Idol should not replicate, such as Agoncillo's less than effective hosting style and the somewhat scripted and less wise comments of Magalona and Corrales.

=== Idol Philippines telecast ===
The second season of Idol Philippines, the iteration produced by ABS-CBN was broadcast on TV5, along with Kapamilya Channel and A2Z. This marks the return of an iteration of the Idol franchise on the network since Philippine Idol.

== See also ==
- List of TV5 (Philippine TV network) original programming
