= Jan Nieto =

Filipino musician

- Birth name: Jan Kurt Anthony Pasion Nieto
- Born: June 13, 1981 (age 43); Santa Mesa, Manila, Philippines
- Origin: Antipolo, Rizal, Philippines
- Genres: Pop
- Years active: 2006-present
- Labels: IndiMusic

Jan Kurt Anthony Pasion Nieto (born June 13, 1981) is a Filipino male singer who rose to prominence as one of the runners-up of Philippine Idol in 2006. With the height of 5 ft 10.5 in (1.791 m) and weighing 165 pounds (75 kg), he was dubbed as the "Hunky Idol" during the competition. Nieto was an artist of GMA Network.

== Biography ==
=== Early life and career ===
Nieto is the youngest son of medical doctors Rolando Nieto and Ethelyn Pasion in a brood of six. His mother is also an undersecretary of the Department of Health. His parents named all of their children with the initials "J" and "K", as his siblings are named Joseph Kenneth, Johnielle Keith, James Kenrick, Judy Kristine, and Janelle Kathleen. When he was born at the Our Lady of Lourdes Hospital in Santa Mesa, Manila, his sisters insisted on adding the name "Anthony" because he was born on the Feast of St. Anthony of Padua. He was often teased as a child for his dark skin, calling him "Nognog". His brother, Johnielle Keith (Kit), is a former Mayor of Cainta.

He studied in Ateneo de Manila University from Preparatory until he graduated with a degree in Management Engineering. The first song he learned to sing is "My Love Will See You Through" by Marco Sison when he was 7 years old. When his father heard him sing while singing Christmas carols in their home, he would make him sing in front of house guests during parties, although he considered himself as the shy type in the family.

Nieto started singing in public when he was in second year high school as part of a class Christmas caroling and had no formal vocal training, except being a member of a church choir and receiving criticisms from his father and informal training from his older brother Johnielle Keith who works as a lawyer. He also tried to join his college glee club, but only stayed for several weeks because of the difficulty of catching up with his co-members.

Nieto considered himself as a nerd in school. He preferred studying for examinations a week before because cramming does not work for him. He admitted being a "teacher's pet" in school, even until college. Aside from studying, Nieto also has interest in sports such as tennis (his favorite), judo (which he excels), table tennis, badminton, and basketball (which in another interview he said he dislikes).

Before auditioning for Philippine Idol, he worked as a Customer Marketing Manager for Unilever Philippines where he worked since February 2003. However, he never told anyone that he actually wanted to become a singer.

=== Philippine Idol ===
Following his dream of becoming a professional singer, and through encouragement of his friends, Nieto auditioned in the Luzon Main Auditions held in Philippine International Convention Center in Pasay. It was his first time to have tried out in any singing contest. He sang "Limang Dipang Tao" (A Five-Dipa-Long Queue of People), a composition of Idol judge Ryan Cayabyab. His audition was not shown until the show's tenth week, which featured special segments about the Final 3.

Several people who knew Nieto were surprised that he tried out for Idol, including actor Alfred Vargas, who was once his classmate.

He landed on the Top 4 during the Men's Semi-Final Round and became one of the 12 Finalists.

During the competition, he offered fellow finalist Ken Dingle—who at the time was based in Baguio—a place to stay at his house. Dingle, who taught Nieto how to sing in R&B style, resided in the Nieto household even after his elimination. He also volunteered, with the help of his mother, in helping fellow finalist Pow Chavez recover from her asthma during the Women's Semi-Finals.

The judges often compared Nieto (who studied in Ateneo de Manila University) with fellow finalist Gian Magdangal (who studied in a De La Salle school), calling it "the new Ateneo-La Salle rivalry". They are also compared to the rivalry between Filipino singers Martin Nievera and Gary Valenciano during the 1980s. Entertainment writers even predicted that Nieto and Magdangal would vie for the title.

One of his performance highlights was his rendition of Nievera's "You Are My Song" during the Final 6 Round wherein the songs were chosen by another finalist. In Nieto's case, it was Magdangal who picked the song. Nieto admitted that it was a difficult song because of its wide range and some of its high notes were beyond his normal range. Eventually, he was surprised with the judges' positive reactions.

Nieto landed at the Bottom 3 twice and on the Hot Spot once, when there was no official Bottom 3 or 2 announced. This happened for three consecutive weeks before the Finale.

He was often criticized during the competition that his performances were stiff, inorganic, or not note-perfect. However, the judges noted that he showed improvement as weeks passed, with Cayabyab calling it "from 0 to 100". Nieto was also criticized that he breezed through every round, and eventually into the Final 3, because of his family's riches. He said that every contestant's family is supporting their own, but the vote of the whole country would overpower his family's votes.

He considered himself as the underdog in the Finale, compared to fellow finalists Magdangal and Mau Marcelo who had been the favorites of both the judges and the audience.

During the Finale, he proved his critics that he deserved to be in the competition with his performances that the judges praised, which were described as musically flawless and exuding of masculine appeal. However, he settled for the runner-up position along with Magdangal as Marcelo was proclaimed winner.

=== Post-Idol ===
Nieto immediately resigned from Unilever after Philippine Idol to fully pursue a singing career. This decision worried some of the people close to him because a career in music is uncertain unlike his stint in the corporate world.

He was managed by Sandra Chavez of i-Asia Management Company, which is appointed by Fremantle Media (owner of all Idol franchises) to handle the careers of all finalists.

Nieto and fellow Idol finalist Miguel Mendoza has also appeared on the ABS-CBN show ASAP '07 alongside Piolo Pascual, Sam Milby, Jay-R Siaboc, and Ronnie Liang. Moreover, Nieto was also interviewed in TV Patrol World about his appearance on ASAP '07. Along with Idol finalist Jelli Mateo, Nieto also sang a food condiment jingle that was rearranged by Cayabyab.

He also appeared in various mall shows and corporate events.

It took nine and a half months after the competition before Nieto got his major break when he signed for GMA Network as part of its musical variety show SOP Rules. He joined Magdangal, who became part of GMA Network a month after Philippine Idol, in the show. Nieto said that it was only then when he felt the effect of his participation in Idol. Beginning the year 2008, he began being managed by Leo Dominguez (who also manages the careers of Ogie Alcasid and Lovi Poe) and Paolo Bustamante (manager of Brad Turvey and one of the writers of Philippine Idol).

== Filmography ==
=== Television ===
Year	Title	Role	Network
2006–2010	SOP Rules	Performer	GMA Network
2010	P.O.5 (party on 5)	Performer	TV5 (formerly ABC 5)

== Recordings ==
His first recorded single is "Tuwing Umuulan At Kapiling Ka", which was originally sung by Basil Valdez and Eraserheads. It is part of Philippine Idol: The Final 12 CD, a compilation of songs performed by Philippine Idol finalists during the OPM Week.

After months of preparations and recordings, his self-titled debut album was released March 2009 under IndiMusic (label owned by, among others, Ogie Alcasid and Regine Velasquez). Ogie serves as the album Producer, which includes two of his compositions entitled "Sa Puso Ko" and the album's carrier, "Bakit Kailangan Pang Lumayo". Initially thought of as a CD lite (contains 6 songs), Ogie suggested to make it a full album of 10 cuts. Jan co-wrote (with his manager) the lyrics of one of the songs, "Together", which co-Philippine Idol finalist Miguel Mendoza doing the music.

Jan sang theme songs of two GMA 7 evening soaps - Kamandag and Ang Babaeng Hinugot Sa Aking Tadyang. He also performed theme songs of two Independent films - Sangandaan from the movie Paupahan and Bakit Kailangan Pang Lumayo from the soon to be released film Marino.

== Singles ==
- Ikaw ang Pag-Ibig (Ang Babaeng Hinugot sa Aking Tadyang Theme Song)
- Ngayon at Kailanman (Originally performed by Basil Valdez)
- Bakit Kailangan Pang Lumayo (first Carrier Single of his Debut Album)
