= Pinoy Idol =

2008 Philippine television reality show

- Title card
- Genre: Reality competition
- Based on: Pop Idol by Simon Fuller
- Directed by: Louie Ignacio
- Presented by: Raymond Gutierrez
- Judges: Ogie Alcasid; Jolina Magdangal; Wyngard Tracy
- Country of origin: Philippines
- Original language: Tagalog
- No. of episodes: 37

Production
- Executive producer: Perry Lansigan
- Production locations: FILMEX Studio, Makati; CenterStage, SM Mall of Asia, Pasay; SMX Convention Center, SM Mall of Asia, Pasay, Philippines
- Camera setup: Multiple-camera setup
- Running time: 60 minutes
- Production companies: FremantleMedia; 19 Entertainment; CKX, Inc.; GMA Entertainment TV

Original release
- Network: GMA Network
- Release: April 5 – August 17, 2008

Related
- Philippine Idol; Idol Philippines

Pinoy Idol (transl. Filipino idol) is a 2008 Philippine television interactive reality competition show broadcast by GMA Network. Created and developed by FremantleMedia and 19 Entertainment, the program is a franchise of Pop Idol created by Simon Fuller, the show is the follow-up of Philippine Idol. Directed by Louie Ignacio, it is hosted by Raymond Gutierrez, with Ogie Alcasid, Jolina Magdangal and Wyngard Tracy as judges. It premiered on April 4, 2008. The show concluded on August 17, 2008, with a total of 37 episodes.

== Development ==
ABC 5 had previously announced that they are considering producing a second season of the show. However, many reports claim that ABC management was slowly abandoning that plan. Sources claimed that ABC incurred heavy losses in the previous season, primarily because of the low number of advertisement slots despite being a widely followed show. ABC asserted that it was still under negotiation with FremantleMedia about the second season and had earmarked Asian Idol as its "big launch", although there was a possibility that GMA was negotiating about Idol as well since the network already had local versions of Celebrity Duets and Are You Smarter Than A 5th Grader?—both FremantleMedia franchises.

After several negotiations, FremantleMedia had officially decided to move and to have the second season aired on GMA Network, which premiered on April 5, 2008. FremantleMedia's representative Geraldine Bravo said that it is "very fortunate" to find a new partner, while GMA Network's Senior Vice President for Entertainment Wilma Galvante added that both parties have agreed that the network "has the experience, the resources, and the people to mount talent-search programs".

== Overview ==
Judges

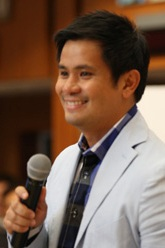
Ogie Alcasid

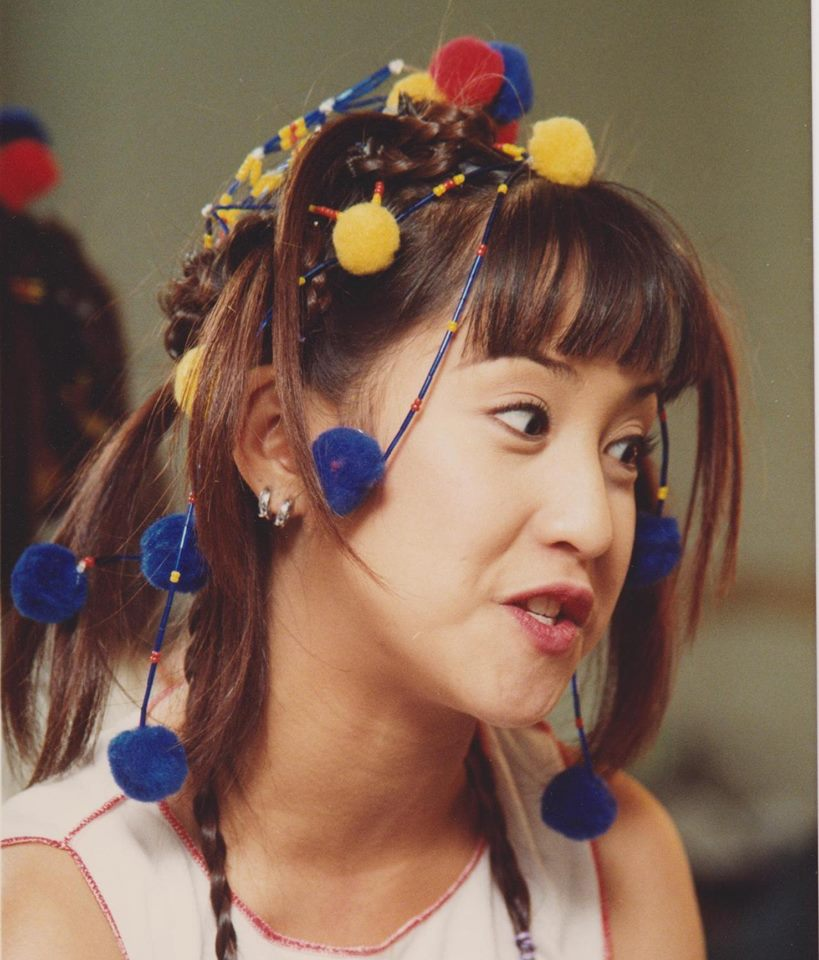
Jolina Magdangal

=== Auditions ===
Auditions for Pinoy Idol were held in the following cities: Cagayan de Oro, Batangas City, Iloilo City, Cebu City, Davao City, Pasay, Dagupan, and Angeles City. During the Pasay auditions, Ida Henares, head of the GMA Artist Center, took over Magdangal's seat in the judges' panel as the latter was in the United States at the time. Out of thousands of aspirants, 179 passed through the next round of eliminations.

=== Theater rounds ===
The 179 audition passers gathered in Manila for the theater rounds in Cinema 6 of SM City North EDSA. The first round saw the hopefuls divided into groups of 10 and they each performed their pieces in front of the judges. Ninety contestants were chosen for the second round. In the second round, the ninety aspirants formed pairs and each pair had duets to perform together; they were judged separately. Half of the ninety were virtually cut. The final forty-five each performed a song of their choice for a final time in front of the judges. Afterwards, they were divided into three groups of fifteen. One group was eliminated, bringing the number down to thirty.

In April 2008, the judges re-examined the performances of the final thirty survivors, starting from their audition pieces down to their final ones in the theater round. Then, in the GMA Network Center, the judges announced the fates of the thirty. It is from this final group that the Top 24 were chosen.

The 2008 Beijing Olympics song "Ready to Fly" by Amy Pearson was used extensively throughout the audition and theatre phases of the competition.

=== Semi-finalists ===
Pinoy Idol's 24 semi-finalists.

The 24 semi-finalists were announced on May 17, 2008. Some of their names were changed or shortened so it would be easier for viewers to remember. Their names and short biographies were also published the day after the announcement. The semifinals, or "workshop phase," began on May 23, 2008, with the Top 12 male contestants performing first and the Top 12 female contestants performing the next day. Eliminations were on a weekly basis beginning May 25, 2008, until the Top 12 was finalized.

==== Male semi-finalists ====
Joselindo Pimpino Jr., also known as JJ Jr., is 17 from Bataan. He currently studies in Baguio where his parents live. He also claims to be Pinoy Pop Superstar's youngest competitor at age 14. He auditioned in Dagupan.

1. "You to Me Are Everything" (The Real Thing)
2. "King of Wishful Thinking" (Go West)
3. "Signed, Sealed, Delivered I'm Yours" (Stevie Wonder)
4. "When I Need You" (Leo Sayer) - Eliminated, June 15, 2008

Walton Zerrudo is 25 from Laguna. He considers standards as his forte and describes his son as his inspiration. He auditioned in Pasay.

1. "She's out of My Life" (Michael Jackson)
2. "Every Breath You Take" (The Police)
3. "Hello" (Lionel Richie) - Eliminated, June 8, 2008

Ryan "Rye" Estrada is 28 from Iloilo. He is a band vocalist and a self-confessed Robbie Williams fan. During the theater rounds, his third performance piece was dedicated to his mother. He auditioned in Iloilo.

1. "Your Love" (Alamid)
2. "Babe" (Styx) - Eliminated, June 1, 2008

Sherwin Bayangan, who goes under the name of Sherwin Marquez, is 26 from Dagupan. He currently lives with his parents in Tuguegarao. He auditioned in Dagupan.

1. "How Do You Heal a Broken Heart" (Chris Walker)
2. "The Old Songs" (Barry Manilow) - Eliminated, June 1, 2008

Paulo Dio Maghari, also known as Dio Paolo, is 24 from Bacolod. He is a call center agent and a son of a receptionist. He has sung in concerts and has even acted in a musical. He auditioned in Iloilo.

1. "Angels Brought Me Here" (Guy Sebastian) - Eliminated, May 25, 2008

Eleuterio "Elliot" Andal is 24 from Batangas. A son of a jeepney driver, he worked as a choral trainer and conductor and has won plums in several choral competitions. He was also a contestant on Pinoy Pop Superstar. He auditioned in Batangas.

1. "Sana Ay Ikaw na Nga" (Basil Valdez) - Eliminated, May 25, 2008

==== Female semi-finalists ====
Carol (Anne) Leus is 17 from Batangas, currently studying in the College of St. Benilde. In 2004, she joined and topped the Pop Star Search in Dubai, organized by The Filipino Channel. She auditioned in Pasay.

1. "I Believe In You and Me" (Whitney Houston)
2. "It Must Have Been Love" (Roxette)
3. "The Voice Within" (Christina Aguilera)
4. "I Turn to You" (Christina Aguilera) - Eliminated, June 15, 2008

Meryl (Consulta) David is 23 from the Bicol Region. She is the daughter of a former singer and a real estate broker whose achievement is finishing her course in nursing while singing in a band. She auditioned in Angeles.

1. "You Mean The World To Me" (Toni Braxton)
2. "I Feel for You" (Chaka Khan)
3. "Killing Me Softly with His Song" (Roberta Flack) - Eliminated, June 8, 2008

Regene Ong is 20 from Quezon City. She impressed the judges by singing a wide range of songs, and is equally known for her self-made vintage dresses. She auditioned in Pasay.

1. "Fever" (Elvis Presley)
2. "With Or Without You" (U2) - Eliminated, June 1, 2008

Vrenilyn "Vren" Villaflor is 17 from Quezon City. A daughter of a police officer, she joined several singing tilts as a child, including Ang Batang Kampeon and Tuklas Talino. She auditioned in Pasay.

1. "Fame" (Irene Cara)
2. "Wind Beneath My Wings" (Bette Midler) - Eliminated, June 1, 2008

Beverly "Bev" Ejercito is 18 from Davao. She is a daughter of a company driver and is proud of graduating from high school and winning pageants. She also matches her big hair with her big voice. She auditioned in Pasay.

1. "Crazy" (Patsy Cline) - Eliminated, May 25, 2008

Drizzle (Emerald) Muñiz is 28 from Quezon City. She is a professional songwriter who penned one of Sarah Geronimo's songs from the latter's album. She auditioned in Pasay.

1. "My Immortal" (Evanescence) - Eliminated, May 25, 2008

==== Semifinals weekly song themes ====
- Week 1 (May 23 & 24): Own choice of songs
- Week 2 (May 30 & 31): Hit songs from year of birth
- Week 3 (June 6 & 7): Greatest musical influences
- Week 4 (June 13 & 14): Songs for fathers

=== Top 12 finalists ===
After the eliminating the eleventh and twelfth semi-finalists from the competition, the Final 12 was formally announced on June 15, 2008. The finals, or "gala night" stage, started on June 21, 2008, with eliminations the next night. Like the semi-finals, eliminations during the finals are on a weekly basis for the first seven weeks.

In the eighth week, two finalists were cut from the competition in a single night to accommodate the final three finalists for the finale; that elimination took place on August 10, 2008. The finale shows took place on August 16 and August 17, 2008, at the SMX Convention Center.

Gretchen (Stephanie) Espina is 20 from Biliran. She is the daughter of Rogelio J. Espina, the governor of the said province. She is studying in the University of the Philippines, Diliman where she is a member of the internationally acclaimed University of the Philippines Singing Ambassadors (UPSA). During the competition, she was never in the bottom group. She auditioned in Pasay accompanied by a bodyguard.

1. "Neither One Of Us (Wants To Be The First To Say Good-bye)" (Gladys Knight & The Pips)
2. "The Way You Make Me Feel" (Michael Jackson)
3. "Wala Na Bang Pag-ibig?" (Jaya)
4. "Try It On My Own" (Whitney Houston)
5. "Respect" (Aretha Franklin)
6. "A House Is Not a Home" (Dionne Warwick)
7. "Follow Your Road" (Pauline Wilson)
8. "Kung Maibabalik Ko Lang" (Regine Velasquez)
9. "You Lift Me Up" (Jaya)
10. "Ikaw Lang Ang Aking Mahal" (Brownman Revival)
11. "Gaano Kadalas Ang Minsan" (Basil Valdez)
12. "I'm Here" (Fantasia Barrino)
13. "For Your Eyes Only" (Sheena Easton; Jolina Magdangal's choice) - Winner, August 17, 2008
14. "Stand Up for Love" (Destiny's Child; Jaya's choice) - Winner, August 17, 2008
15. "Ngayon" (Basil Valdez; personal choice) - Winner, August 17, 2008
16. "To You" (winner's performance song) - Winner, August 17, 2008

Jay Ann "Jayann" Bautista is 21 from Pampanga. She studies in the University of the Philippines, Diliman and her parents run their own businesses. She was formerly a talent of VIVA Entertainment and had released two albums (2003: JayAnne, 2006: Call Me JayAnne) under its record label. Like Espina, she was never placed in the bottom group during the competition. She auditioned in Angeles.

1. "Secret" (Heart)
2. "Kiss" (Prince)
3. "Bleeding Love" (Leona Lewis)
4. "I Am Changing" (Jennifer Hudson)
5. "(You Make Me Feel Like) A Natural Woman" (Aretha Franklin)
6. "Whine Up" (Kat DeLuna)
7. "Better Days" (Dianne Reeves)
8. "Pangarap Ko Ang Ibigin Ka" (Regine Velasquez)
9. "Laging Naroon Ka" (Jaya)
10. "Akin Ka Na Lang" (Itchyworms)
11. "You" (Basil Valdez)
12. "Finally" (Fergie)
13. "I'll Never Love This Way Again" (Dionne Warwick; Wyngard Tracy's choice) - Second place, August 17, 2008
14. "You'll Never Walk Alone" - (Christine Johnson; Regine Velasquez's choice) - Second place, August 17, 2008
15. "Proud Mary - (Creedence Clearwater Revival; personal choice) - Second place, August 17, 2008
16. "To You" (winner's performance song) - Second place, August 17, 2008

Ramon "Ram" Chaves III is 25 from Cagayan de Oro. He considers fatherhood as his most cherished accomplishment as his audition in Pasay coincided with his wife giving birth.

1. "My Hero" (Foo Fighters)
2. "Boys Don't Cry" (The Cure)
3. "Kung Ayaw Mo, 'Wag Mo" (Rivermaya)
4. "My Sacrifice" (Creed)
5. "With Arms Wide Open" (Creed)
6. "Banal na Aso, Santong Kabayo" (Yano)
7. "Yugyugan Na" (P. O. T.)
8. "Tuwing Umuulan At Kapiling Ka" (Regine Velasquez; originally by Basil Valdez)
9. "Honesty" (Jaya; originally by Billy Joel)
10. "Sandalan" (6 Cycle Mind)
11. "Ngayon at Kailanman" (Basil Valdez)
12. "Bahay Yugyugan" (Francis Magalona)
13. "Bridge Over Troubled Water" (Simon & Garfunkel; Ogie Alcasid's choice) - Third place, August 17, 2008
14. "I Don't Want to Miss a Thing" (Aerosmith; Jaya's choice) - Third place, August 17, 2008
15. "Handog" (Florante; personal choice) - Third place, August 17, 2008

Daryl (Jett) Celis is 21 from Rizal. He is a son of an OFW, a bar owner in Japan. He auditioned in Pasay with his grandmother, whom he calls his lucky charm.

1. "Still with You" (Eric Benét)
2. "True Colors" (Cyndi Lauper)
3. "Because of You" (Ne-Yo)
4. "Right Here Waiting" (Richard Marx)
5. "Superstar" (Delaney, Bonnie & Friends)
6. "Basta't Kasama Kita" (Dingdong Avanzado)
7. "Kung Kailangan Mo Ako" (Rey Valera)
8. "Sa Piling Mo" (Regine Velasquez and Ogie Alcasid)
9. "Ikaw Lamang" (Jaya)
10. "Nasaan Ka" (Pupil)
11. "Hanggang Sa Dulo Ng Walang Hanggan" (Basil Valdez)
12. "The Promise" (Martin Nievera) - Eliminated, August 10, 2008

Elizalde "Kid" Camaya is 24 from Pampanga, as iterated by the program. He currently works for a BPI branch in Quezon City, to which his introductory profile refers as his residence. He says that the show is his "dream and passion." He auditioned in Pasay.

1. "A Song for You" (Andy Williams)
2. "(There's) Always Something There to Remind Me" (Naked Eyes)
3. "Love Always Finds A Way" (Peabo Bryson)
4. "Gone Too Soon" (Michael Jackson)
5. "Ordinary People" (John Legend)
6. "I'll Never Love This Way Again" (Dionne Warwick)
7. "The Warrior Is A Child" (Gary Valenciano)
8. "Narito Ako" (Regine Velasquez)
9. "Kung Wala Na" (Jaya)
10. "Stay" (Cueshé)
11. "Paano Ba Ang Mangarap" (Basil Valdez)
12. "Careless Whisper" (George Michael) - Eliminated, August 10, 2008

Warren Antig is 25 from Baguio. He also goes under the nickname of "Bordado" because of his tattoos. He became notorious for his decision to back out of the competition during the Theater rounds, only to change his mind in the last minute, irking judges Alcasid and Magdangal in the process and causing delays in the taping of those rounds. He auditioned in Dagupan.

1. "Ulitin" (P. O. T.)
2. "Open Arms" (Journey)
3. "Billie Jean" (Michael Jackson)
4. "Panaginip" (P. O. T.)
5. "Shout" (Tears For Fears)
6. "You Give Love a Bad Name" (Bon Jovi)
7. "Balong Malalim" (Juan dela Cruz Band)
8. "Urong Sulong" (Regine Velasquez)
9. "Cool Change" (Jaya; originally by Little River Band)
10. "Kahit Kailan" (South Border)
11. "Kung Ako'y Iiwan Mo" (Basil Valdez) - Eliminated, August 3, 2008

Penelope Ann Matanguihan, known only as Penelope in the show, is 16 from Batangas. She is a perennial singing champion who is "raring to fight for her family." She auditioned in Batangas.

1. "Wild Horses" (Natasha Bedingfield)
2. "(Everything I Do) I Do It for You" (Bryan Adams)
3. "One Step at a Time" (Jordin Sparks)
4. "Papa, Can You Hear Me?" (Barbra Streisand)
5. "Alone" (Heart)
6. "So Sick" (Ne-Yo)
7. "This Is My Now" (Jordin Sparks)
8. "What Kind of Fool Am I?" (Regine Velasquez; originally by Anthony Newley)
9. "Beauty and Madness" (Jaya; originally by Fra Lippo Lippi)
10. "Weak" (Freestyle) - Eliminated, July 27, 2008

Kristoffer Rei Tragico, or Toffer Rei in the show, is 23 from Marikina. He is the son of a driver and a housewife. Despite being from Luzon, he auditioned in Iloilo.

1. "Stigmatized" (The Calling)
2. "I Want to Break Free" (Queen)
3. "Something to Say" (Harem Scarem)
4. "I Could Not Ask for More" (Edwin McCain)
5. "Honestly" (Harem Scarem)
6. "Changes In My Life" (Mark Sherman)
7. "It's My Life" (Bon Jovi)
8. "You Made Me Stronger" (Regine Velasquez)
9. "Sometimes You Just Know" (Jaya) - Eliminated, July 20, 2008

Sue Ellen Cubing, known only as Sue Ellen, is 16 from Iloilo. She is a daughter of a pastor and beauty pageant runner-up. She and her sister, Genevieve, auditioned together in Iloilo and made it through the theater rounds, where Genevieve was among those eliminated.

1. "Love Thang" (Michelle Williams)
2. "More Than Words" (Extreme)
3. "Love Like This" (Natasha Bedingfield)
4. "Thank You" (Dido)
5. "Survivor" (Destiny's Child)
6. "In the End" (Linkin Park)
7. "Jesus Take the Wheel" (Carrie Underwood)
8. "Dadalhin" (Regine Velasquez) - Eliminated, July 13, 2008

Roberto "Robby" Navarro, Jr. is 28 from Pampanga. He was once part of a singing group called the Wise Guys, but made a difficult decision to go solo, which he claims is paying off. He released an eponymous solo album way back in 1999 under Sony BMG. He auditioned in Angeles.

1. "Whenever, Wherever, Whatever" (Maxwell)
2. "What You Won't Do for Love" (Bobby Caldwell)
3. "Wildflower" (Color Me Badd)
4. "If Tomorrow Never Comes" (Garth Brooks)
5. "One Last Cry" (Brian McKnight)
6. "Someone That I Used To Love" (Natalie Cole)
7. "Greatest Love of All" (Whitney Houston) - Eliminated, July 6, 2008

(Angeli) Mae Flores is 18 from Marikina. She competed in the talent show Star for a Night, the same one in which Sarah Geronimo and Mau Marcelo participated. She auditioned in Angeles.

1. "Love Will Show You Everything" (Jennifer Love Hewitt)
2. "Listen To Your Heart" (Roxette)
3. "Walk Away" (Kelly Clarkson)
4. "Angels" (Robbie Williams)
5. "You Oughta Know" (Alanis Morissette)
6. "If I Didn't Love You" (Tina Arena) - Eliminated, June 29, 2008

Jenifer "Jeni" Rawolle is 20 from Paco, Manila. She previously competed in Pinoy Pop Superstar. She auditioned in Pasay.

1. "For Once in My Life" (Vonda Shepard)
2. "Lean On Me" (Club Nouveau)
3. "Too Darn Hot" (Ella Fitzgerald)
4. "You Raise Me Up" (Secret Garden)
5. "Inseparable" (Natalie Cole) - Eliminated, June 22, 2008

=== Finals weekly song themes ===
- Week 1 (June 21): Songs from their greatest pre-Idol performances
- Week 2 (June 28): Song dedications
- Week 3 (July 5): Songs of their lives
- Week 4 (July 12): Songs sung by Regine Velasquez
- Week 5 (July 19): Songs sung by Jaya
- Week 6 (July 26): Songs by OPM bands
- Week 7 (August 2): Songs sung by Basil Valdez
- Week 8 (August 9): Greatest Idol performances
- Week 9 (August 16): Judges' choice, favorite mentor's choice, and personal choice

==== "Special" guests ====
The following have become mentors for the finalists. The mentors in Weeks 4, 5, and 7 also supplanted the jury as a special guest judge, while in Week 6, several of the members, if not all members, of each mentor band appeared on stage to oversee the performance of the apprentice finalist.

- Week 4: Regine Velasquez
- Week 5: Jaya
- Week 6 (in order of performance of song): 6 Cycle Mind, Itchyworms, Pupil, Brownman Revival, Cueshé, South Border and Freestyle
- Week 7: Basil Valdez

==== Finale ====
Pinoy Idol held its Performance Night Finale on August 17, 2008, at the SMX Convention Center at the SM Mall of Asia in Pasay. Each of the three remaining contenders performed three songs, one personally chosen by the contestant, one by one of the judges and one by the contestant's favorite mentor. Gutierrez hosted most of the program while joining him in the sidelines were Rhian Ramos and Karylle. Each song was performed with Tan's band and the group The Opera as back-up singers, just as always. They were also joined in each of two joint performances by Basil Valdez and Regine Velasquez. The bands Freestyle, South Border, Cueshé and Itchyworms also have performances of their own.

In an unusual instance, the judges held off their comments for each of the finalists' performances until after the last performance of the last finalist. Each of the three judges told one of the three finalists about his comments on the performances as well as those of the other judges.

The next night at the same venue, the star-studded results show was held, headlined by Bautista, Chaves, and Espina together with the rest of the Top 24, performing together with Hajji Alejandro, Jett Pangan, Luke Mejares, Verne Varga and Duncan Ramos. The third placer was immediately announced soon after with Chaves shut out of the final two, leaving Bautista and Espina in the running for the title.

There were performances by the bands Pupil, Callalily and Rivermaya.

For their final performance before the announcement of the winner, Bautista and Espina each performed an original composition "To You" by resident judge Alcasid and with the University of the Philippines Concert Chorus as back-up choir.

Espina was voted as the first Pinoy Idol, although no figures were announced for all three finalists. Aside from the title, Espina received P1 million, a condominium unit, a brand new car, a recording contract with Sony BMG Music Philippines, and a television contract with GMA Network.

== Elimination chart ==
Safe	Safe first	Safe last

Stage		Semi-finals				Finals									
Week		5/25	6/1	6/8	6/15	6/22	6/29	7/6	7/13	7/20	7/27	8/3	8/10	8/17	
Place	Contestant	Result													
1	Gretchen Espina														Won
2	Jay-Ann Bautista														Runner-up
3	Ram Chavez		Bottom 4							Bottom 3				Elim	
4-5	Daryl Celis				Bottom 2			Bottom 3		Bottom 3			Elim		
4-5	Kid Camaya			Bottom 3		Bottom 3			Bottom 4		Bottom 3		Elim		
6	Warren Antig						Bottom 3				Bottom 3	Elim			
7	Penelope								Bottom 4		Elim				
8	Toffer Rei			Bottom 3			Bottom 3		Bottom 4	Elim					
9	Sue Ellen					Bottom 3		Bottom 3	Elim						
10	Robby Navarro		Bottom 4					Elim							
11	Mae Flores		Bottom 4	Bottom 3	Bottom 2		Elim								
12	Jeni Rawolle			Bottom 3		Elim									
13-14	JJ Jr.				Elim										
13-14	Carol Leus				Elim										
15-16	Meryl David		Bottom 4	Elim											
15-16	Walton Zerrudo			Elim											
17-20	Rye Estrada		Elim												
17-20	Sherwin Marquez		Elim												
17-20	Regene Ong		Elim												
17-20	Vren Villaflor		Elim												
21-24	Elliot Andal	Elim													
21-24	Bev Ejercito	Elim													
21-24	Drizzle Muñiz	Elim													
21-24	Dio Paolo	Elim													

== Reception ==
=== Ratings ===
According to AGB Nielsen Philippines' Mega Manila household television ratings, the pilot episode of Pinoy Idol earned a 16.3% rating.

=== Critical response ===
Early into the development of Pinoy Idol, an online campaign requested Ignacio's removal as program director primarily because of his frequent use of butterflies (whether live butterflies or having people wear butterfly wings) on every project he has directed with critics finding the idea "tacky and definitely not Idol-material". He commented that he would still stick to his "lucky trademark" and even taunted petitioners to direct the show and put beetles or mosquitoes on the set if that is what they want - a statement which only added to the collective anger of fans. However, no butterfly-inspired designs were used in the program.

In an article published before Pinoy Idol's premiere, noted film and television critic Nestor U. Torre hoped that the lapses that occurred in Philippine Idol would be remedied in Pinoy Idol. However, once the show went underway, those hopes seem to dampen as Torre noted on the first episode alone some mediocre talent and Gutierrez not yet becoming his own as host. Torre did laud the judging styles of Alcasid and Magdangal and Tracy's emerging Simon Cowell-like demeanor. One viewer, who wrote to the Philippine Daily Inquirer about the show, was not as impressed when comparing it to Philippine Idol, complaining about Gutierrez's nasal and unnatural hosting style, Magdangal's immaturity as a judge and Tracy seemingly imitating Cowell more as compared to Cayabyab.

Entertainment writer Jean Oli wrote that Pinoy Idol does not have that "Idol feel" despite high expectations towards GMA Network, calling it "an ordinary singing contest." She even stated that the network's previous singing contests such as Pinoy Pop Superstar and Celebrity Duets: Philippine Edition were more interesting to watch than Pinoy Idol.

In a post-mortem article written six days after the finale, Torre wrote that the entire Finals phase of the competition came out less exciting than Philippine Idol's because of several factors, namely some of the finalists were not even star-material, the entire audition process that put them in the competition in the process, and the early elimination of the better singers from the competition. He even doubts if the winners and others in the competition were really talented and versatile enough to take advantage of the strong support that they had during the competition.

== Cancellation ==
GMA Network was initially deciding on whether to produce a second season of Pinoy Idol. GMA's Senior Vice President for Entertainment, Wilma Galvante said that GMA Network and Fremantle were accessing "learnings" from the first season, such as the text-voting mechanisms, which she said is "different for the Philippine [version]." In 2009, GMA Network did not renew the franchise.
