= Wyngard Tracy =

Filipino talent manager (1952–2010)

- Born: February 7, 1952; Quezon City
- Died: November 16, 2010 (aged 58); Makati
- Occupations: DJ, talent manager
- Years active: 1972–2010

Wyngard Tracy (February 7, 1952 – November 16, 2010) was a Filipino talent manager who had represented various actors and music artists, such as Side A in the Philippines through his office, Artiststation, Inc. From June 2008, he was one of three judges in Pinoy Idol on GMA Network. He was also the judge of top-rating ABS-CBN shows, Showtime and Magpasikat, but was later evicted.

Tracy was the manager of Kaye Abad, Richard Gomez, Lucy Torres, Maricel Soriano, Wendell Ramos, John Estrada and Priscilla Meirelles.

== Biography ==
Tracy's career began as a television production assistant in the 1970s before becoming a radio disc jockey on DWWK, which was the Philippines' first pop FM station. After a brief DJing stint, he was referred to Vicor Entertainment Corporation and was tapped to manage its roster of recording artists, including Pinky de Leon, Maricris Vermont, and Leah Navarro.

As a businessman, Tracy, together with friends Mark de Leon and Ricky Trinidad, founded "The Music Hall" in Annapolis St. in Greenhills. As a talent manager, he also became one of the judges for Search for the Star in a Million on ABS-CBN in 2005. Tracy even became one of the contestants in the Philippine version of Celebrity Duets & Pinoy Idol judge on GMA Network, where he was ranked fifth.

He was a judge of the PNT Singing Idol competition in Vancouver, Canada in 2008 and 2009.

He appeared on ABS-CBN's top-rating talent show Showtime as a guest judge in January 2010.

He is also known as "The Simon Cowell of the Philippines"....

== Death ==
Tracy was rushed to the Makati Medical Center on October 20, 2010. Reports said he suffered his third stroke. The following day, on October 21, Tracy underwent operation to remove the blood clot in his brain. Earlier in July, Tracy underwent a heart surgery after he was rushed to the hospital due to a heart attack.

At around 3:45am on November 16, 2010, Tracy died due to stroke.
