= Born Diva =

- Genre: Lifestyle, Reality, Music
- Presented by: Zsa Zsa Padilla
- Opening theme: "Unleash the Diva" by Zsa Zsa Padilla
- Country of origin: Philippines
- Original language: Filipino
- No. of episodes: 16

Production
- Executive producer: Apples Braga
- Running time: 60 minutes

Original release
- Network: ABS-CBN
- Release: August 28 – November 13, 2004

Born Diva is a Philippine reality competition show broadcast by ABS-CBN. Hosted by Zsa Zsa Padilla, it aired from August 28 to November 13, 2004, replacing Star in a Million.

== Overview ==
=== Finalists ===
- Shayne Corpuz
- Reema Lucida
- Raki Vega
- Jenna Pascual
- Desiree Sandoval
- Sophia Montecarlo
- Athena Soler
- Shanice Michaels

=== Contestants ===
Contestant	Song Choice	Also Known As	Original Song
Shayne Corpuz	"'Di Man Lang Nagpaalam"	The Awesome Diva	1st Winner /2nd runner up
Reema Lucida	"Higher"	The Power Diva	2nd Winner
Raki Vega	"Today"	The Classic Diva	3rd Winner / Champion
Jenna Pascual	"Make It Through"	The Captivating Diva	4th Winner
Desiree Sandoval	"Mula Noon Hanggang Ngayon"	The Sensational Diva	5th Winner
Sophia Montecarlo	"Reason To Go On"	The Dazzling Diva	6th Winner
Athena Soler	"Kung Ika'y Akin Kahapon"	The Darling Diva	7th Winner
Shanice Michaels	"Hadlang"	The Fabulous Diva	8th Winner /1st runner up

== See also ==
- List of programs broadcast by ABS-CBN
- Little Big Star
- Little Big Superstar
- Search for the Star in a Million
- Tawag ng Tanghalan
