= Bahay Pag-asa =

Juvenile detention center in the Philippines

- Type: State-funded and nonprofit juvenile detention centers
- Legal status: Instituted by Republic Act 9344
- Region served: Philippines
- Services: Residence for abused, neglected and delinquent children, childhood intervention
- Affiliations: Department of Social Welfare and Development; Juvenile Justice and Welfare Council

The Bahay Pag-asa (BPA, lit. 'House of Hope') refers to a juvenile detention center in the Philippines.

== Background ==
The Republic Act 9344, the Juvenile Justice and Welfare Act of 2006, serves as the legal basis for Bahay Pag-asa facilities. They were initially called as Youth Detention Homes. The term Bahay Pag-asa was institutionalized via Republic Act No. 10630, which amended R.A 9344 on October 3, 2013.

The Bahay Pag-asa are juvenile detention centers or youth's rehabilitation center for "children in conflict with the law" (CICL). It is characterized as a 24-hour child-caring institution funded and managed by local government unit and affiliated non-government organizations.

Each province and highly urbanized city in the Philippines is required to maintain a Bahay Pag-asa in accordance with the standards established by the Department of Social Welfare and Development (DSWD) and the Juvenile Justice and Welfare Council (JJWC). Each Bahay also should include an Intensive Juvenile Intervention and Support Center (IJISC), a specialized facility that provides multidisciplinary intervention programs for CICLs who require intensive support. The DSWD has a three-level accreditation for Bahay Pag-asa.

== Admission ==
CICLs aged 15 to 17 may be housed in a Bahay Pag-asa while awaiting a court decision on their case or transfer to another agency or jurisdiction. However, children aged at least 12 may also be admitted to the facility.

Children may be referred to the facility for admission. Those who are determined to be dependent, abandoned, neglected, or abused may be voluntarily admitted by their parents or legal guardians. The Department of Social Welfare and Development (DSWD) or the Local Social Welfare and Development Office (LSWDO) may also file a petition on behalf of a child for involuntary admission.

Children aged 12 to 15 years old who are involved in serious crimes are considered neglected children and are required to be placed in an IJISC.

== Locations ==
As of May 2026, there are 118 operational Bahay Pag-asa across the Philippines.

== Issues ==
These facilities often faces issues of underfunding and overcrowding. As of November 2018, there were only 58 operational Bahay Pag-asa with eight only compliant with the standard. At that time the required number of Bahay Pag-asa in the country is at 114.
