= Mau Marcelo =

Filipina soul singer and composer

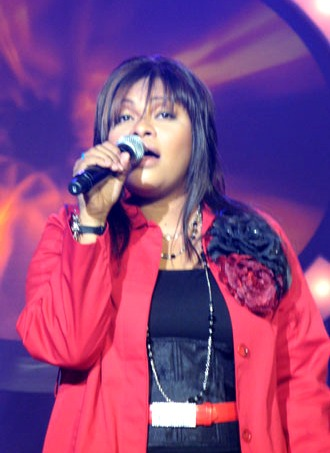
- Mau Marcelo during her performance on Philippine Idol

Background information
- Born: Maureen Flores Marcelo; May 13, 1980 (age 46)
- Origin: Lucena City, Quezon Province, Philippines
- Genres: Soul, R&B
- Years active: 2003–2014, 2018–present
- Label: Sony BMG

Maureen "Mau" Flores Marcelo (born May 13, 1980) is a Filipino singer and songwriter who rose to prominence as the first winner of Philippine Idol in 2006. She was dubbed as the "Soul Idol" and "The Black Belter" at the competition for her R&B-style vocals. She was also called "Philippines' Diamond Diva" after her much-applauded performance of "Diamonds Are Forever" by Shirley Bassey during the Movie and Musical Theme Week.

For a time, she went by the stage name Samantha Brown, based on her father's surname.

She was also the Philippine representative to Asian Idol, which was held on December 15 and 16, 2007 in Jakarta, Indonesia.

== Early life and career ==
Marcelo's mother is Filipino while her father is an American citizen from Puerto Rico. Her father left the family when she was four months old, while her mother died when she was 14. She has a half-sister from her mother and two half-brothers and another half-sister from her father.

It was Marcelo's mother who taught her how to sing when she was seven years old, wherein she first learned to sing "Somewhere Out There". She first performed publicly in a singing contest during her school's foundation day when she was first grade. It was also the first time that she won. She eventually joined different local singing contests around her native Quezon Province when she was eight, winning most of the time thus giving her a boost of self-esteem. She also learned to accept herself and her looks.

A year after her mother's death, Marcelo's father came into her life once more when he returned to the Philippines. It was the first time she met her American father. Since then, they had constant communication even though her father lives in Atlanta with his own family. She eventually graduated in Quezon National High School and attended college in Manuel S. Enverga University Foundation, both in Lucena City.

By her 20s, Marcelo became a veteran of singing competitions. She joined her first national singing competition through Star for a Night, which was shown on IBC-13. She reached the grand finals, but lost to Sarah Geronimo. Losing in the competition did not dampen her spirits. She eventually joined a band called "Chemical Syndrome" and toured around Lucena City and surrounding areas. She has also joined other televised singing competitions such as Star Quest at ABS-CBN's Magandang Tanghali Bayan and ABC-5's Sing Galing.

In 2004, Marcelo went to Singapore to gain foreign exposure in singing with the help of her stepsister's husband. Using her screen name "Samantha Brown", she performed in various bars and has become popular with the city-state's Filipino community.

By the time Marcelo was about to audition for Philippine Idol, she won in over 200 amateur singing competitions. She even joked in an interview that she had so many trophies in her house that she donated some of them to gay beauty pageants.

== Philippine Idol ==
Marcelo tried out in Philippine Idol through a "fast track" screening held in SM City Lucena. Passing the fast track audition meant that she did not have to go through the numerous screenings of the main auditions.

She was contestant number 1646 during her auditions in Pasay, wherein she sang Jaya Ramsey's "Laging Naroon Ka" (You Were Always There). Her audition was not shown on Philippine Idol, although she appeared during the final phase of the theater eliminations singing "How Am I Supposed to Live Without You" by Laura Branigan.

Despite her impressive auditions, Marcelo's journey through Philippine Idol was not easy. She did not reach the Top 4 of the Women's Semi-finals and had to go through the Wildcard. Her confidence slowly started to dwindle to the point that she commented during the Wildcard Results Show, when there was only one finalist spot to fill, that Philippine Idol is a "beauty contest". Her sarcastic yet tearful comment garnered laughter and applause from the audience, including Idol judge Ryan Cayabyab. When her name was finally called as one of the finalists, Marcelo cried out loud on stage.

During competition, Marcelo's father had petitioned her to migrate to the United States. Marcelo talked to him about what she was going through the competition. He advised that she can continue with the contest, but would rather not see her getting hurt in the process. She ultimately decided to continue.

Marcelo received immense fan support during Philippine Idol to the point that some of them even lent their services to her by giving her a total make-over from her choice of clothes, hairstyle, posture, and even her manner of speaking. She even underwent a strict South Beach Diet and lost 12 pounds during the competition.

Lea Salonga, who was a guest judge during the Movie and Musical Theme Week on November 19, 2006, praised Marcelo and named her as the best singer in the competition.

Officially, she was at the Bottom 3 twice. Marcelo was also called twice in the "Hot Spot", wherein the official Bottom 3 or 2 were not announced.

Some entertainment writers did not predict Marcelo as the eventual titleholder, saying that the competition was looking for a "Philippine Idol", not a diva. They even compared her to Ruben Studdard, winner of the second season of American Idol, who may have had the talent but did not have the popularity.

During the Finale held in Araneta Coliseum, the Idol judges boldly predicted that a male would win the competition, subtly implying that it would become a showdown between Gian Magdangal and Jan Nieto. Marcelo received negative comments from the judges on her first two songs—namely "Love Takes Time" by Mariah Carey which was her personal choice and "Balut" by New Minstrels which was the judges' choice—despite what appeared to be impressive performances. She rebounded on her third song, "Try It on My Own" by Whitney Houston, which was the record company's choice and would become her "victory song" if ever she would win. Her final performance received a long standing ovation from the audience.

The following night, Marcelo cried out loud on stage when it was announced that she bagged the title as the first Philippine Idol, garnering 35.36% of the total votes.

== After-Idol ==
Marcelo's win had mixed reactions. Some say that her win was like "an underdog triumphing in the name of talent", being referred to as the least favorite among more "packaged" Magdangal and Nieto. Others questioned the validity of her win, citing a claim that Marcelo had an existing 5-year contract with Viva Entertainment—which produced Star for a Night—during the competition and that its owner, Vincent del Rosario, was considering to take legal actions against her. Marcelo clarified in a press conference that everything was settled, adding that Viva Entertainment released a statement saying that the company "was very happy for her". Another entertainment scribe affirmed that Nieto should have won Philippine Idol.

Entertainment columnist Lolit Solis even joked that Marcelo fitted perfectly to play the role of Eunice Lagunsad's mother. Lagunsad is a child actress who portrayed as an ugly child named "Charming" in the television series Bakekang. Marcelo admitted that she did not fit the mold of Filipino pop singers, referring to the local audience's penchant to idolize singers based on looks rather than talent.

Upon receiving her cash prize of P800,000 (originally P1 million minus 20% tax), Marcelo was able to buy herself a second-hand car—which was the first thing that came into her mind right after winning—together with her family's needs, such as saving for her partner's college education.

She also decided on extending her stay in the Philippines to focus on her career, adding that she would still pursue singing if she would migrate to the United States.

Marcelo's debut performance as the first Philippine Idol was on ABC-5's Shall We Dance: Christmas with the Champions special where she reprised her winning song. On December 20, 2006, she gave a performance at Malacañang for the Christmas party of the Office of the President of the Philippines.

Together with her fellow Idol finalists, Marcelo performed in a concert held in Araneta Coliseum on March 23, 2007. She also guested in a Lani Misalucha concert together with Frenchie Dy, wherein the three of them performed a Dreamgirls medley.

Marcelo's first solo concert was held in her hometown Lucena City on April 21, 2007, at Sentro Pastoral Auditorium. Her guests include fellow Idol finalist and Lucena resident Reymond Sajor and Chemical Syndrome band, in which she was a former member.

She has appeared on various variety shows, including ABS-CBN's ASAP 07 and GMA Network's SOP Rules, as well as different corporate and radio-sponsored events. She has yet to have a regular stint on TV, compared to Magdangal who became a talent for SOP Rules weeks after Philippine Idol. Marcelo said that she is happy for him and not envious of his success. She performed in Singapore as part of Built from Skratch Skool tour music promotions in 2010 where she showcased new material which would later be released in the Philippines.

== Asian Idol ==
In December 2007, Marcelo participated in Asian Idol, which was held in December 2007 in Jakarta, Indonesia. The competition gathered the winners of Idol across Asia. Despite an impressive showing, which included a standing ovation from Indian Idol judge Anu Malik and three judges predicting that she has a good chance of winning, Marcelo lost to Singapore Idol Hady Mirza. She performed "Ako ang Nasawi, Ako ang Nagwagi" by Dulce and Gloria Estefan's "Reach". Prior to the main show, Marcelo was concerned if she would be able to represent the country since the Philippines' Idol franchise moved from ABC to GMA Network, thinking that the country's participation in Asian Idol would be scrapped.

== Personal life ==
Marcelo has two children, Patricia (born 2002) and Paolo (born 2006). Her daughter Patricia successfully auditioned for Idol Philippines in 2019.

== Recordings ==
=== Pre-Idol ===
Prior to Philippine Idol, Marcelo had also recorded, as "Samantha Brown", a self-titled album of ten original songs composed by her stepsister's husband. She was also part of the compilation album of Star for a Night.

=== 2006: Philippine Idol: The Final 12 ===
Marcelo also recorded a title track under Sony BMG include singles on the Philippine Idol: The Final 12 CD: "Minsan Lang Kitang Iibigin" (solo) and "Kaleidoscope World" (the group song featuring the top 12 finalists).

Following the success of her tilt as the first Philippine Idol CD-EP entitled On My Own was released on January 2, 2007, by Sony BMG as part of her prize in Philippine Idol. Besides the title track ("Try It on My Own", which was her Idol "winning piece"), the EP includes two other songs Marcelo performed on Philippine Idol ("Love Takes Time" and "Minsan Lang Kitang Iibigin"/ I Will Love You Only Once), as well as "Minus One" versions of these songs.

=== 2007: I Shine for You ===
In late 2007, a second album was also released Sony BMG as Marcelo's first full-length album entitled I Shine for You. She said that the title track best describes her struggles during Philippine Idol as well as her way of thanking her fans for their unwavering support. The album also includes a song penned by popular composer Vehnee Saturno entitled "Sino Ba Naman Ako" (Who Am I To...), which was used as one of the theme songs in the Filipino-dubbed broadcast of Come Back Soon-ae on GMA Network (the other one being "Minsan Lang Kitang Iibigin"). The album was launched on GMA's variety show SOP.

== Discography ==
=== Studio albums ===
Year	Title	Record label
2004	Samantha Brown	Self-released
2007	On My Own	Musiko Records/Sony BMG
2007	I Shine for You	Musiko Records/Sony BMG

=== Singles ===
Year	Title	Album
2007	"Try It on My Own"	On My Own
2007	"I Shine for You"	I Shine for You
2008	"Sino Ba Naman Ako"	I Shine for You
2008	"Kagandahan" (with Frenchie Dy and Poy Palma)	I Love Betty La Fea theme song

=== Compilation appearances ===
- Star for a Night (2003), Viva
- Philippine Idol: The Final 12 (2006), Musiko Records/Sony BMG
