= Search for the Star in a Million =

- Genre: Reality competition
- Created by: ABS-CBN Studios; Viva Television (2005-2006)
- Directed by: Bobet Vidanes
- Presented by: Ryan Agoncillo; Agot Isidro; Edu Manzano; Zsa Zsa Padilla; Sarah Geronimo; Erik Santos; Mark Bautista; Christian Bautista
- Country of origin: Philippines
- Original language: Filipino
- No. of seasons: 4
- No. of episodes: 33

Production
- Executive producers: Roldeo Endrinal; Victoria Lami
- Running time: 1 hour

Original release
- Network: ABS-CBN
- Release: November 8, 2003 – January 22, 2006

Related
- Star for a Night (IBC); Search for a Star (GMA Network); Star in a Million (ABS-CBN)

Search for the Star in a Million (formerly Star in a Million after two seasons) is a Philippine television reality competition show broadcast by ABS-CBN. Hosted by Ryan Agoncillo, Agot Isidro, Edu Manzano and Zsa Zsa Padilla, Sarah Geronimo (for Season 1 only), Erik Santos, Mark Bautista, Christian Bautista (for Season 2 only), Rachelle Ann Go (for Season 2 only) and Sheryn Regis (for season 2 only). It aired from November 8, 2003 to January 22, 2006.

== Star in a Million ==
Star in a Million is a singing contest on ABS-CBN in the Philippines. For season 1 from November 8, 2003 to January 3, 2004, the search produced some of the country's singing talents such as Erik Santos, Frenchie Dy, Marinel Santos, Sheryn Regis, OJ Mariano and Christian Bautista. The grand champion was given a contract with Star Records and a hosting stint on ASAP Mania. The most votes a contestant had was on season 2 from July 17 to August 21, 2004, when Ralph David drew 1 million votes for 4 hours later replaced by Born Diva.

=== Hosts ===
- Ryan Agoncillo
- Agot Isidro
- Edu Manzano
- Zsa Zsa Padilla

=== Judges ===
- Dingdong Avanzado
- Anna Fegi
- Cherie Gil
- Nanette Inventor
- Gerard Salonga
- Vernie Varga
- Mel Villena

=== Contestants (season 1) ===
- Erik Santos, Grand Champion
- Sheryn Regis, 2nd Placer
- Marinel Santos, 3rd Placer
- Christian Bautista
- Teresa Garcia
- Michell San Miguel
- DK Tijam
- Johann Escañan
- Gayle Dizon
- Czarina Rosales

==== Results summary ====
Legend
Female	Male	Winner	2nd-3rd Placers

Safe	Bottom Pair/Group	Eliminated

Week number:		1	2	3	4	5	6	7	8	Grand Finals
Elimination date:		11/08/03	11/15/03	11/22/03	11/29/03	12/06/03	12/13/03	12/20/03	12/27/03	01/03/04
Place	Contestant	Result
1	Erik Santos									Winner
2	Sheryn Regis									2nd Placer
3	Marinel Santos									3rd Placer
4	Christian Bautista								Elim
5	Teresa Garcia						Elim
6	Michell San Miguel					Elim
7	DK Tijam				Elim
8	Johann Escañan			Elim
9	Gayle Dizon		Elim
10	Czarina Rosales	Elim

=== Contestants (season 2) ===
- Frenchie Dy, Grand Champion
- Nyco Maca, 2nd Placer
- OJ Mariano, 3rd Placer
- Michael Cruz
- Shanna Hife
- Ralph David
- Emman Omaga
- Jasmine Fitzgerald

==== Results summary ====
Legend
Female	Male	Winner	2nd-3rd Placers

Safe	Bottom 2/3/4	Eliminated

Week number:		1	2	3	4	5	Grand Finals
Elimination date:		07/17/04	07/24/04	07/31/04	08/07/04	08/14/04	08/21/04
Place	Contestant	Result
1	Frenchie Dy					Btm 2	Winner
2	Nyco Maca		Btm 4				2nd Placer
3	OJ Mariano						3rd Placer
4	Michael Cruz			Btm 3	Btm 2	Elim
5	Shanna Hife	Btm 4	Btm 4	Btm 3	Elim
6	Ralph David	Btm 4	Btm 4	Elim
7	Eman Omaga	Btm 4	Elim
8	Jazmine Fitzgerald	Elim

== Search for the Star in a Million ==
Search for the Star in a Million is a reality singing competition produced by ABS-CBN and Viva Television and being aired over ABS-CBN. It aired for first season from March 13 to May 15, 2005. This was the second project of relationship of ABS-CBN and Viva after The Sharon Cuneta Show. The second season aired from September 4, 2005 to January 22, 2006 and had Kris Lawrence as its Grand Champion.

=== Hosts ===
- Erik Santos
- Mark Bautista
- Sarah Geronimo (Season 1 only)
- Christian Bautista (Season 1 only)
- Rachelle Ann Go (Season 2 only and recent guest host during Season 1)
- Sheryn Regis (Season 2 only)

=== Judges ===
- Agot Isidro
- Rowell Santiago
- Wyngard Tracy

=== Contestants (season 1) ===
- Jerome Sala, Grand Champion
- Nikki Bacolod, 2nd Placer
- Mabel Bacusmo, 3rd Placer
- Jona Lumbera, 4th Placer
- Ryan Racal, 5th Placer
- Myke Caluma 6th Placer
- Jorell Canuel 7th Placer
- Dianafe Castillo
- Christine Fernandez
- Billy Joel Bartolome
- Hans Lee
- Veejay Aragon

==== Results summary ====
Legend
Female	Male	Winner	2nd-5th Placers

Hitzone	Dangerzone	Eliminated

Week number:		1	2	3	4	5	6	7	Grand Finals
Elimination date:		03/13/05	03/20/05	03/27/05	04/03/05	04/10/05	04/17/05	04/24/05	05/15/05
Place	Contestant	Result
1	Jerome Sala	Hitzone	Hitzone	Dangerzone	Hitzone	Dangerzone	Hitzone	Hitzone	Winner
2	Nikki Bacolod	Dangerzone	Hitzone	Hitzone	Hitzone	Dangerzone	Hitzone	Hitzone	2nd Placer
3	Mabel Bacusmo	Dangerzone	Hitzone	Hitzone	Hitzone	Hitzone	Hitzone	Hitzone	3rd Placer
4	Jona Lumbera	Hitzone	Hitzone	Hitzone	Hitzone	Hitzone	Hitzone	Hitzone	4th Placer
5	Ryan Racal	Dangerzone	Hitzone	Hitzone	Dangerzone	Dangerzone	Hitzone	Hitzone	5th Placer
6	Myke Caluma	Dangerzone	Hitzone	Dangerzone	Hitzone	Hitzone	Dangerzone	Elim
7	Jorell Canuel	Hitzone	Hitzone	Dangerzone	Dangerzone	Hitzone	Elim
8	Dianafe Castillo	Hitzone	Dangerzone	Hitzone	Dangerzone	Elim
9	Christine Fernandez	Dangerzone	Dangerzone	Dangerzone	Elim
10	Billy Joel Bartolome	Dangerzone	Hitzone	Elim
11	Hans Lee	Hitzone	Elim
12	Veejay Aragon	Elim

=== Contestants (season 2) ===
- Kris Lawrence, Grand Champion
- Tata Villaruel, 2nd Placer
- Jimmy Marquez, 3rd Placer
- Vino Bello, 4th Placer
- Lance Oñate, 5th Placer
- Jay Perillo
- Ais Roxas
- Tony dela Paz
- Shake Valerio
- Francis Ong
- Joey Ignacio
- Anna Baluyot

==== Results summary ====
Legend
Female	Male	Winner	2nd-3rd Placers

Top 1	Safe	Bottom 2/3	Eliminated

Week number:		1	2	3	4	5	6	7	8	9	Grand Finals
Elimination date:		09/04/05	09/18/05	10/02/05	10/16/05	11/06/05	11/20/05	12/04/05	12/18/05	01/08/06	01/22/06
Place	Contestant	Result
1	Kris Lawrence					Top 1	Top 1				Winner
2	Tata Villaruel		Top 1	Top 1						Btm 2	2nd Placer
3	Jimmy Marquez					Btm 3					3rd Placer
4	Vino Bello	Top			Btm 3		Btm 3	Btm 3	Btm 2	Elim
5	Lance Oñate			Btm 3				Btm 3	Elim
6	Jay Perillo					Btm 3	Btm 3	Elim
7	Ais Roxas	Btm 3	Btm 3	Btm 3	Btm 3		Elim
8	Tony Dela Paz				Top 1	Elim
9	Shake Valerio				Elim
10	Francis Ong		Btm 3	Elim
11	Joey Ignacio	Btm 3	Elim
12	Anna Baluyot	Elim

== See also ==
- List of programs broadcast by ABS-CBN
- Born Diva
- Little Big Star
- Little Big Superstar
- Tawag ng Tanghalan
