= Gian Magdangal =

Filipino actor and singer

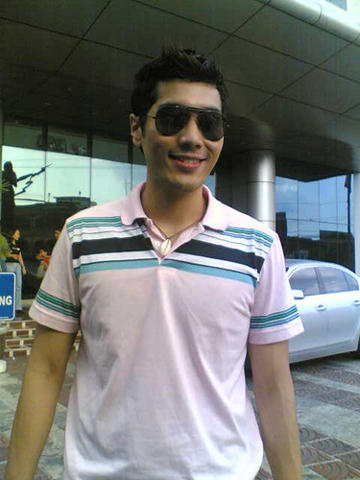
- Magdangal in 2007

Background information
- Born: Giancarlo Alzate Magdangal; November 18, 1981 (age 44)
- Origin: Parañaque, Philippines
- Genres: Pop, R&B, Musical
- Occupations: Singer, actor
- Instrument: Vocals
- Years active: 2001–present (show business)
- Labels: Sony Music Philippines

Giancarlo "Gian" Alzate Magdangal (Tagalog: [ˈdʒijɐn magdɐˈŋal]; born November 18, 1981), is a Filipino singer, performer, theater and television actor. He is a former boy band member of 17:28. he rose to prominence as one of the runners-up of Philippine Idol in 2006.

He is a cousin of actress and fellow singer Jolina Magdangal.

== Biography ==
=== Early life and career ===
Magdangal was born in Parañaque, and claims that he started to sing when he was 2 years old, as he was singing lullabies to his grandmother. He grew up listening to Broadway musicals, Stevie Wonder, Boyz II Men, and Brian McKnight. Seeing his potential as a singer, he was sent to undergo voice lessons at the St. Scholastica's College Conservatory of Music. He also received vocal training from Trumpets Playshop, Sweet Plantado, Mon Faustino, Audie Gemora, Freddie Santos, and Carlo Orosa.

Magdangal's early musical exposure was during high school in La Salle Green Hills when he became part of the Kundirana. It was there where he realized how singing can touch and change lives. During his stint in Kundirana, he perfected his craft in music while still balancing a busy lifestyle as a stage actor in his school's drama club. He was also a member of Tiples de Sto. Domingo, an all-boys choir based in Quezon City.

While in college at De La Salle-College of Saint Benilde, taking up Business Administration with a major in Computer Application, Magdangal became part of a boy band quartet known as 17:28, which was formed by Gemora, along with his college friends. The group had their share of success compiling two albums under Star Music and Viva Records (wherein there were only three member left). One of their songs, "Sukob Na", became a rainy season jingle for ABS-CBN. After three years, the group decided to disband with Magdangal being the only active musician. He formed a band "Gian with Industriya".

After graduating from college in 2003, Magdangal joined Trumpets Music Academy, a company which produced numerous theater plays in the metro in which he gained more exposure in acting. His theater credentials include the musicals Footloose, The Little Mermaid, and Once On This Island.

During his training in Trumpets Music Academy, he accidentally entered a workshop for Advanced Musical Theater, when he was enrolled for the basic workshop. Plantado, the workshop's facilitator at that time, accepted Magdangal in her class where he was introduced with different players in the musical industry who eventually became his trainers. He said that theater training taught him confidence, discipline, humility, and teamwork. He believed that one should not pursue a career in entertainment simply for the money.

However, Magdangal discontinued his singing career to give priority to his family. He disbanded Gian with Industriya and entered the corporate world. Before auditioning for Philippine Idol, he was working as a Marketing Events Officer for Smart Communications.

=== Philippine Idol ===
Magdangal said that Philippine Idol was like "a calling" to return to music. However, he felt that the competition was not meant for him because of conflicts between his work and the audition dates. He only found an opening at the Cebu auditions, but he was short of money. He eventually flew to Cebu City with the help of sponsors in time for the final leg of the auditions, where he sang "The Last Time" by Eric Benét. He wore a gray coat, which he considered as his good luck charm, all throughout the audition and theater eliminations.

When Magdangal got into the Top 24, he took a leave of absence "without pay" from his work. This was to avoid suspicion that Smart Communications, which was a major advertisement sponsor of Philippine Idol, was backing him up.

He failed to make to the Top 4 during the Men's Semi-Final Round, and had to go through the Wildcard phase to enter the Top 12 Finalists.

The judges often compared Magdangal (who studied in a De La Salle school) with fellow finalist Jan Nieto (who studied in Ateneo de Manila University), calling it "the new Ateneo-La Salle rivalry". They are also compared to the rivalry between Filipino singers Martin Nievera and Gary Valenciano during the 1980s. Entertainment writers even predicted that Magdangal and Nieto would vie for the title.

He was placed at the Bottom 4 or Bottom 3 twice. Although Magdangal was praised by the judges for his vocal talent, he is often criticized for his lack of emotional depth when performing his contest pieces.

He admitted that there were several physical changes in him during the competition, such as losing weight from 180 pounds to 162 pound at 6' 1", as well as getting sick days before the finale that he had to undergo medication.

He placed runner-up to eventual winner Mau Marcelo in a hotly contested voting verdict made by the public.

=== Post-Idol ===
Magdangal received P250,000 as prize for being a runner-up on Philippine Idol. He said that he gave part of it to pay family debts and some of it went to his savings.

Weeks after the competition, Magdangal signed a non-exclusive contract with GMA Network and had been a regular talent in its Sunday noontime variety show SOP Rules. However, a stipulation in Magdangal's contract states that he is not supposed to mention "Philippine Idol" in any of his appearances on GMA Network, and this has been noticeable since his first appearances.

Magdangal, along with fellow Idol finalists Jelli Mateo and Pow Chavez, were included in a list of Most Promising People of 2007. He was described as the year's Christian Bautista, if not even better.

Together with his fellow Idol finalists, Magdangal performed in a concert held in Araneta Coliseum on 23 March 2007.

He performed in Binibining Pilipinas beauty pageant in 2007, where he serenaded the finalists. Magdangal also guested in a fund-raising concert entitled "From the Soul...For the Mind", which benefited non-government organization Family Farm Schools. He performed in a concert headlined by Tiples de Santo Domingo, in which he was a member, in Philam Life Theater on 15 September 2007.

He won Best Performance by a New Male Artist at the 20th Awit Awards in August 2007 for his song "Himala" that was part of the Philippine Idol Top 12 Album.

Magdangal was included in Candy Magazine's list of "Candy Cuties" for 2007.

He also guested in the Philippine version of Celebrity Duets, wherein he performed with socialite and self-proclaimed "eventologist" Tim Yap.

In 2011, Magdangal was cast as Crisóstomo Ibarra in the stage musical Noli Me Tángere, an adaptation of José Rizal's novel of the same name by composer Ryan Cayabyab and librettist Bienvenido Lumbera.

On 18 February 2015, Magdangal was interviewed and revealed he is now a cast member of Hong Kong Disneyland playing multiple roles like Capt. Li Shang of Mulan in the Golden Mickeys Theater Show.

=== Personal life ===
Magdangal has one child, Gian Haley with Sheree Bautista. In 2025, he married singer Lara Maigue.

== Filmography ==
=== Television / digital series ===
Year	Title	Role
2006	Philippine Idol	Contestant / Runner-up
2007–2010	SOP	Himself / Performer
2009	Rosalinda	Gerardo
2010–2013	Party Pilipinas	Himself / Performer
2011–2012	Kokak	Norman
2013	Forever	Rico
2013	Sunday All Stars	Himself ('Insta Gang' Member)
2013	Myx 3on3	Player (Yellow Team)
2013	Annaliza	Atty. Jun Castro
2014	Carmela: Ang Pinakamagandang Babae sa Mundong Ibabaw	Tasyo Fernandez
2014	Rhodora X	Medical Team I
2014	Niño	Juanito
2014	Bet On Your Baby	Himself
2018	FPJ's Ang Probinsyano	Executive Secretary Damien Ocampo
2019; 2022	ASAP Natin 'To	Himself (guest performer)
2021–2022	Viral Scandal	Bobby Ramones
2022	Lyric and Beat	Adrian
2022	Mano Po Legacy: The Flower Sisters	Adult Felino Go
2023	Regal Studio Presents: My Fairy Lady	Harris
2023	The Iron Heart	Cian
2023	Abot-Kamay na Pangarap	Lander Soler
2025	Akusada	Atty. Carlo Marcelo

=== Film ===
Year	Title	Role	Note(s)
2023	Kahit Maputi Na ang Buhok Ko		
2024	Chances Are, You and I		
2024	Fuchsia Libre	Daddy Yo	
2025	Untold	Geraldo Vera	
2026	Ouano Ave. (Cebuano Guys)	Kurt Castillo	
2027	Mga Taong Naka-Underwear sa EDSA	Elton Delgado	

== Discography ==
=== Studio album ===
Year	Title	Label
2009	Love Tracks	Musiko/Sony Music

=== with 17:28 ===
(Members: Gian Magdangal, Jonard Yanzon, Chino Alfonso, Wackie Valdes)

Year	Title	Label
2003	17:28	Star Music
2004	Cozy	Viva Records

== Awards ==
Year	Award-giving Body	Category	Ref.
2006	Awit Awards	Best Performance by a New Male Artist	
2008	GMMSF Box-Office Entertainment Awards	Most Promising Male Singer	
2018	Gawad Buhay Awards	Male Lead Performance in a Musical	
2023	Gawad Buhay Awards	Male Lead Performance in a Musical	
