= Morissette discography =

Filipino artist discography

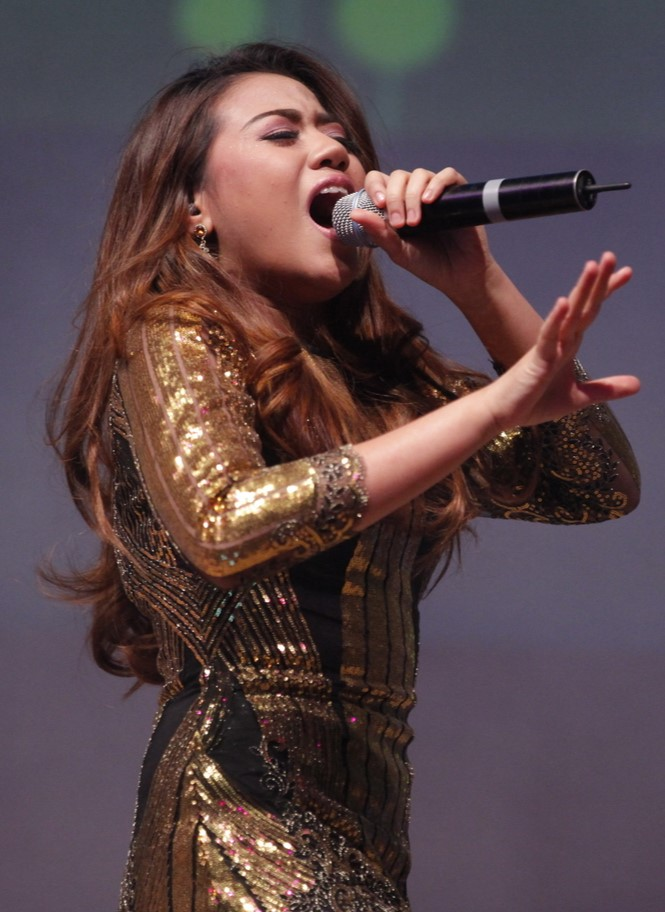
- Morissette performing in 2015
- Studio albums: 4
- EPs: 3
- Compilation albums: 1
- Singles: 27
- Promotional singles: 19

Filipino singer and songwriter Morissette has released four studio albums, one compilation album, three extended plays (EPs), twenty-seven singles (including seven as featured artist), and eighteen promotional singles. Her songs have also been featured in seventeen films and television series.

== Albums ==
=== Studio albums ===
List of studio albums, with sales figures and certifications
Title	Album details	Sales	Certifications
Morissette	Released: March 20, 2015; Label: Star Music; Formats: CD, digital download, streaming	PHI: 15,000 (Note: Philippine sales figure equivalent of platinum certification for Morissette.)	PARI: Platinum
Morissette at 14, Vol 1	Released: November 20, 2020; Label: Flasher Factory; Formats: Digital download, streaming		
Morissette at 14, Vol 2	Released: June 25, 2021; Label: Flasher Factory; Formats: Digital download, streaming		
If We Never Happened	Released: June 28, 2023; Label: Underdog Music PH; Formats: Digital download, streaming		

=== Compilation albums ===
List of compilation albums
Title	Album Details
Signature (Collection)	Released: January 12, 2023; Label: Underdog Music PH; Formats: Digital download, streaming

== Extended plays ==
List of extended plays
Title	Album Details
Signature	Released: August 20, 2021; Label: Underdog Music PH; Formats: Digital download, streaming
Signature: Live!	Released: December 17, 2021; Label: Underdog Music PH; Formats: Digital download, streaming
From the Sea	Released: January 28, 2022; Label: Underdog Music PH; Formats: Digital download, streaming

== Singles ==
=== As lead artist ===
List of singles as lead artist, showing year released and originating album
Title	Year	Album
"'Di Mapaliwanag" (Note: "'Di Mapaliwanag" is the lead single from Morissette's debut album Morissette. It was later selected as the main theme song for the Korean drama My Lovely Girl, which was broadcast on ABS-CBN.)	2015	Morissette
"Run Like a Warrior Home Radio 97.9 (Radio Edit)"	2015	Non-album singles
"Panaginip"	2018	Non-album singles
"Diyan Ba Sa Langit" (with Jason Dy and KIKX)	2019	Non-album singles
"This is Christmas" (with Ben Adams)	2019	Non-album singles
"Heaven Knows" (with Rick Price)	2020	Non-album singles
"Akin Ka Na Lang (Latin Version)"	2020	Non-album singles
"Diyan Ba Sa Langit (Midnite Remix)" (with Jason Dy and KIKX)	2020	Non-album singles
"Love You Still"	2020	Signature
"Phoenix"	2021	Signature
"Waterwalk"	2021	Non-album singles
"Phoenix (Sunrise Version)"	2022	Non-album singles
"Undangon Ta Ni"	2022	Non-album singles
"Gusto Ko Nang Bumitaw (Brian Cua Club Remix)" (with Brian Cua)	2022	Non-album singles
"Will You Stay (His Version)" (with From the Sea and Dave Lamar)	2023	If We Never Happened
"Something Only We Know (Her Version)" (with From the Sea and Dave Lamar)	2023	If We Never Happened
"Ang Paghuwat" (with Ferdinand Aragon)	2024	Non-album singles
"Wishing Well"	2024	Non-album singles
"Ihilak Lang Na"	2024	Non-album singles

=== As featured artist ===
List of singles as featured artist, showing year released and originating album
Title	Year	Album
"Unbound" (Marion Aunor featuring Alex Gonzaga and Morissette)	2015	Marion
"Run Like a Warrior" (Djds featuring Morissette)	2016	Magic Potion
"You and Me Tonight" (Djds featuring Morissette)	2016	Magic Potion
"If You Never Crossed My Life" (Tim Pavino featuring Morissette)	2016	Tim Pavino
"Ikaw Lamang" (Christian Bautista featuring Morissette)	2017	Kapit
"So Close" (Sponge Cola featuring Morissette)	2023	Hometown, Part 2
"Love It All Out" (Greg Gould featuring Morissette)	2024	Non-album singles
"Ahon" (December Avenue featuring Morissette)	2025	Non-album singles

=== Promotional singles ===
List of promotional singles, showing year released and originating album
Title	Year	Album
"What About Love"	2013	The Voice of the Philippines The Final 16
"Begin"	2013	The Voice of the Philippines The Final 4
"Akin Ka Na Lang" (Note: "Akin Ka Na Lang" was originally released in the album Himig Handog P-pop Love Songs (2014) in 2014 and was included in Morissette's debut album Morissette in 2015.)	2014	Himig Handog P-Pop Love Songs (2014)
"Take and Receive"	2015	We Are All God's Children
"Diamante"	2016	Himig Handog P-Pop Love Songs (2016)
"Mahal Naman Kita"	2017	Hey It's Me, Jamie!: 30th Anniversary Album
"Naririnig Mo Ba"	2017	Himig Handog 2017
"Piko"	2018	Awit at Laro
"Iniwan sa Kawalan" (with ST. WOLF)	2019	Non-album promotional singles
"Papara"	2019	Non-album promotional singles
"Miss Kita Kung Christmas" (with ST. WOLF)	2019	Non-album promotional singles
"Shine (25th Anniversary Version)"	2021	Non-album promotional singles
"Bayaning Tunay" (with various artists)	2021	Non-album promotional singles
"Power (Miss Universe Philippines 2022)"	2022	Non-album promotional singles
"Pagbigyang Muli"	2022	The Music of Jonathan Manalo: 20 Years
"Colour Everywhere"	2022	The Way You Look At Me: The Songs of Christian Bautista
"Imagine More"	2022	Non-album promotional single
"Ang Huling El Bimbo"	2023	Dalamhati: A Troy Laureta OPM Collective, Vol. 3
"Love the Philippines"	2025	Non-album promotional single

== Soundtrack appearances ==
List of official soundtrack singles showing year released and the film or show
Title	Year	Film / TV Show
"Pangako" (with Mark Alain)	2011	Ang Utol Kong Hoodlum
"Tulad Ko"	2012	Felina: Prinsesa ng mga Pusa
"Moon of Desire"	2014	Moon of Desire
"Anong Nangyari Sa Ating Dalawa" (Note: Morissette recorded "Anong Nangyari Sa Ating Dalawa" for the series Two Wives in 2014. It was later included as a bonus track in Morissette's debut album Morissette in 2015.)	2014	Two Wives
"Kapag Ako Ay Nagmahal" (Note: Morissette recorded "Kapag Ako Ay Nagmahal" for the series FlordeLiza in 2015. It was later included as a bonus track in Morissette's debut album Morissette.)	2015	FlordeLiza
"Nothing's Gonna Stop Us Now" (Note: Morissette and Padilla recorded "Nothing's Gonna Stop Us Now" for Padilla's film Crazy Beautiful You in 2015. It was later included as a bonus track in Morissette's debut album Morissette.) (with Daniel Padilla)	2015	Crazy Beautiful You
"'Di Mapaliwanag"	2015	My Lovely Girl
"Someone's Always Saying Goodbye"	2015	You're Still the One
"Akin Ka Na Lang"	2015	Pasión de Amor
"Ikaw ay Ako" (with Klarisse de Guzman)	2015	Doble Kara
"Something I Need" (solo or with Piolo Pascual)	2016	Everything About Her
"Baby I Love Your Way" (with Harana)	2016	The Third Party
"Hanggang" (with Erik Santos)	2017	The Better Half
"Akin Ka Na Lang"	2019	FPJ's Ang Probinsyano
"A Whole New World" (with Darren Espanto)	2019	Aladdin
"Gusto Ko Nang Bumitaw"	2022	The Broken Marriage Vow
"Hanapin ang Sarili"	2025	Song of the Fireflies
"Umawit Ka (Pop Version)" (with Rachel Alejandro)	2025	Song of the Fireflies

== Songwriting and production credits ==
Credits are courtesy of Tidal, Spotify, and AllMusic.

Title	Year	Album	Artist(s)	Credits	Written with	Produced with
"Iniwan Sa Kawalan"	2019	Non-album single	Morissette, ST. WOLF	Composer, lyricist, and vocals	ST. WOLF	—
"Love You Still"	2020	Signature	Morissette	Composer and producer	Dave Lamar	Dave Lamar, Miguel Jimenez, Xergio Ramos
"Trophy"	2021	Signature	Morissette	Composer and producer	Dave Lamar	Dave Lamar, Miguel Jimenez, Xergio Ramos
"Will You Stay"	2021	Signature	Morissette	Composer and producer	Dave Lamar	Dave Lamar, Miguel Jimenez, Xergio Ramos
"Mirror"	2021	Signature	Morissette	Composer and producer	Dave Lamar	Dave Lamar, Miguel Jimenez, Xergio Ramos
"Trophy"	2021	Signature	Morissette	Composer and producer	Dave Lamar	Dave Lamar, Xergio Ramos
"Free"	2022	From the Sea	From the Sea, Morissette, Dave Lamar	Composer and producer	Dave Lamar	Dave Lamar
"Up and Away"	2022	From the Sea	From the Sea, Morissette, Dave Lamar	Composer and producer	Dave Lamar	Dave Lamar
"True North"	2022	From the Sea	From the Sea, Morissette, Dave Lamar	Composer and producer	Dave Lamar	Dave Lamar
"Luna"	2022	From the Sea	From the Sea, Morissette, Dave Lamar	Composer and producer	Dave Lamar	Dave Lamar
"Undangon Ta Ni"	2022	Non-album single	Morissette	Composer	Carlisle Tabanera, Dave Lamar, Ferdinand Aragon, Relden Campanilla	—
"If We Never Happened"	2023	If We Never Happened	From the Sea, Morissette, Dave Lamar	Composer and producer	Dave Lamar	Dave Lamar
"Still End Up Falling"	2023	If We Never Happened	From the Sea, Morissette, Dave Lamar	Composer and producer	Dave Lamar	Dave Lamar
"Safe in Your Eyes"	2023	If We Never Happened	From the Sea, Morissette, Dave Lamar	Composer and producer	Dave Lamar	Dave Lamar
"That's Where You'll Find Me"	2023	If We Never Happened	From the Sea, Morissette, Dave Lamar	Composer and producer	Dave Lamar	Dave Lamar
"Winter"	2023	If We Never Happened	From the Sea, Morissette, Dave Lamar	Composer and producer	Dave Lamar	Dave Lamar
"Something Only We Know (Her Version)"	2023	If We Never Happened	From the Sea, Morissette, Dave Lamar	Composer and producer	Dave Lamar	Dave Lamar
"Ang Paghuwat"	2024	Non-album singles	Morissette, Ferdinand Aragon	Producer	—	Shadiel Chan, Dave Lamar
"Wishing Well"	2024	Non-album singles	Morissette	Composer and producer	Dave Lamar	Dave Lamar
"Ihilak Lang Na"	2024	Non-album singles	Morissette	Producer	—	Shadiel Chan, Dave Lamar
