= List of awards and nominations received by Morissette =

Morissette awards and nominations
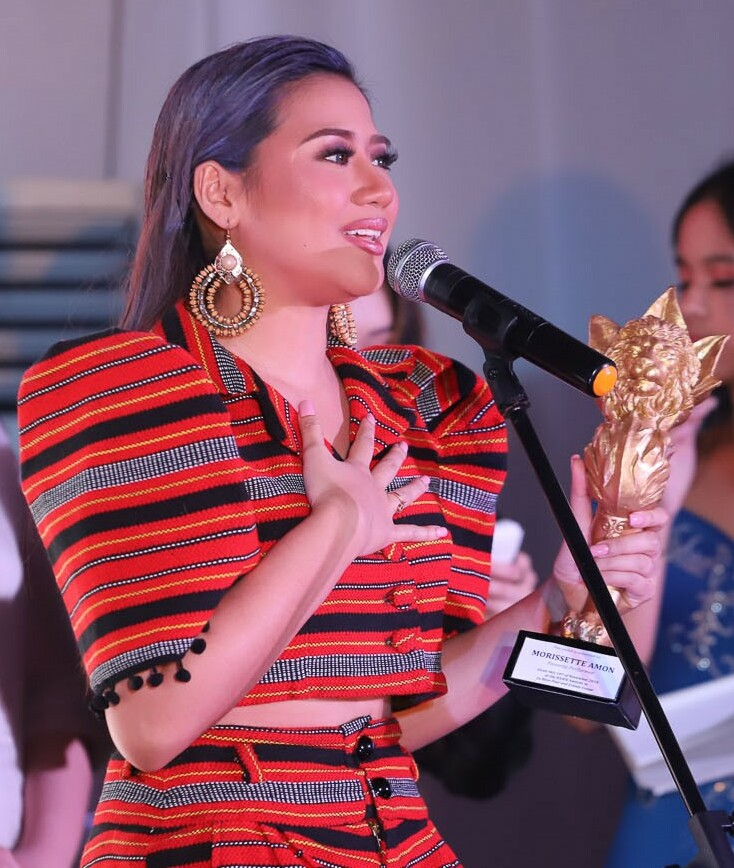
- Morissette at the 2018 RAWR Awards
Awards and nominations
Award	Wins	Nominations
Aliw Awards	1	5
Asian Academy Creative Awards	2	2
Awit Awards	2	16
Box Office Entertainment Awards	1	1
Billboard Philippines Women in Music	1	1
Colorist Awards	0	1
ComGuild Academe's Choice Awards	1	1
EdukCircle Awards	3	4
FAMAS Awards	0	2
Himig Handog	0	3
Manila International Film Festival	1	1
MOR Pinoy Music Awards	2	3
Muse Creative Awards	3	3
Music Rank Extra Awards	3	3
Myx Music Awards	0	7
NCAF Seal of Excellence Awards	2	2
New York Festivals TV & Film Awards	1	1
PPOP Awards	1	1
Profiles of Excellence Awards	1	1
Push Awards	2	5
RAWR Awards	1	3
Star Awards for Music	6	15
Star Cinema Awards	1	4
The Honors	1	1
Village Pipol Choice Awards	0	3
Wish 107.5 Music Awards	38	44
WorldFest-Houston International Film Festival	0	1

Totals (Note: Certain award groups do not simply award one winner. They acknowledge several different recipients, have runners-up, and have third place. Since this is a specific recognition and is different from losing an award, runner-up mentions are considered wins in this award tally. For simplification and to avoid errors, each award in this list has been presumed to have had a prior nomination.)
- Wins: 74
- Nominations: 134

Filipino singer and songwriter Morissette has received numerous awards and nominations throughout her career. In 2014, she signed a record deal with Star Music and launched her eponymous debut studio album in 2015. Later that year, she received a Best New Artist award at the 2015 MOR Pinoy Music Awards, and her debut album earned her the Star Awards' New Female Recording Artist of the Year. Additionally, she was awarded the Top Filipino Excellence Award and the Gawad Musika Award for being the Outstanding Female Performing Artist of the Year by the National Consumer Affairs Foundation's 34th Seal of Excellence Awards. In 2016, she made history by becoming the first recipient of the Wish Female Artist of the Year award and was chosen as the Wishers’ Choice - Female Artist of the Year at the 2016 Wish 107.5 Music Awards. She received a prize of ₱200 thousand, which she donated to her chosen beneficiary, Home for the Angels. As of January 2024, her donations to her WMA beneficiaries have amounted to approximately ₱1.2 million.

Morissette was listed as one of the most influential people by various organizations in the following years. Her concerts, including Birit Queens (2017) and Morissette Is Made (2018), won several awards at the EdukCircle Awards, RAWR Awards, Box Office Entertainment Awards, and Star Awards for Music. She was also recognized by People Asia magazine's as one of the Women of Style and Substance in 2018. At the 2019 Wish 107.5 Music Awards, she made history by becoming the first artist to receive 11 awards, seven of which were from the Wishclusive Elite Circle. The following year, she was the inaugural recipient of the Wish Hall of Fame award—KDR Icon of Music and Philanthropy. With a total of 38 wins, she holds the record for the most awards received in the history of the Wish Music Awards.

In addition to her achievements in music, Morissette has been recognized for her philanthropic endeavors with several awards. These include two Asian Academy Creative Awards, three Muse Creative Awards, and one award from the New York Festivals TV & Film Awards.

== Awards and nominations ==
Key
†	Indicates non-competitive categories

Award	Year (Note: Indicates the year of ceremony. Each year is linked to the article about the awards held that year, wherever possible.)	Category	Recipient(s) and nominee(s)	Result	Ref.
Aliw Awards	2014	Best New Artist	Herself	Nominated	
Aliw Awards	2017	Best Collaboration in a Concert	Platinum	Nominated	
Aliw Awards	2018	Best Collaboration in a Concert	A Lani Morissette Musical Journey	Won	
Aliw Awards	2020	People's Choice Award	Herself	Nominated	
Aliw Awards	2020	Best Major Concert (Female)	In the Key of Love	Nominated	
Asian Academy Creative Awards	2022	Best Theme Song or Title Theme (Philippines)	"Gusto Ko Nang Bumitaw"	Won	
Asian Academy Creative Awards	2023	Best Branded Programme or Series (Philippines)	A Night of Wonder - Disney+ Philippines	Won	
Awit Awards	2015	Best Performance by a New Female Recording Artist	"Akin Ka Na Lang"	Nominated	
Awit Awards	2018	Best Ballad Recording	"Naririnig Mo Ba"	Won	
Awit Awards	2020	Best Ballad Recording	"Diyan Ba Sa Langit" (with Jason Dy)	Won	
Awit Awards	2022	Favorite Female Artist	Herself	Nominated	
Awit Awards	2022	Favorite Song	"Up and Away"	Nominated	
Awit Awards	2022	Favorite Song	"Luna"	Nominated	
Awit Awards	2022	Favorite Group Artist	Herself, Dave Lamar, From the Sea	Nominated	
Awit Awards	2022	Best Performance by a Female Recording Artist	"Waterwalk"	Nominated	
Awit Awards	2022	Best Performance by a Female Recording Artist	"Phoenix"	Nominated	
Awit Awards	2022	Best Vocal Arrangement	"Phoenix"	Nominated	
Awit Awards	2023	Record of the Year	"Gusto Ko Nang Bumitaw"	Nominated	
Awit Awards	2023	Best Remix Recording	"Gusto Ko Nang Bumitaw (Brian Cua Remix)"	Nominated	
Awit Awards	2024	Best Ballad Recording	"Something Only We Know (Her Version)"	Nominated	
Awit Awards	2024	Best Vocal Arrangement	"Something Only We Know (Her Version)"	Nominated	
Awit Awards	2024	Best Remix Recording	"Love You Still (Sunset Version)"	Nominated	
Awit Awards	2024	Best Collaboration	"So Close" (Spongecola feat. Morissette)	Nominated	
Billboard Philippines Women in Music	2024	People's Choice Award	Herself	Won	
Box Office Entertainment Awards	2018	Most Promising Female Concert Artist of the Year	Birit Queens	Won	
Colorist Awards	2020	Best Color in Music Video	"Love You Still"	Longlisted	
ComGuild Academe's Choice Awards (Note: The ComGuild Academe's Choice Awards was established in 2001 to recognize the work of Filipino broadcasters, news presenters, public figures, and practitioners.)	2019	Female Artist of the Year	Herself	Won	
EdukCircle Awards	2017	Most Influential Concert Performer of the Year	Birit Queens	Won	
EdukCircle Awards	2018	Most Influential Concert Performer of the Year	Morissette is Made	Won	
EdukCircle Awards	2018	Best Female Music Artist	Herself	Nominated	
EdukCircle Awards	2019	Best Female Music Artist	Herself	Won	
FAMAS Awards	2016	Best Theme Song	"Nothing's Gonna Stop Us Now" (with Daniel Padilla)	Nominated	
FAMAS Awards	2017	Best Theme Song	"Something I Need" (with Piolo Pascual)	Nominated	
Himig Handog	2014	Best Song	"Akin Ka Na Lang"	Nominated	
Himig Handog	2016	Best Song	"Diamante"	Nominated	
Himig Handog	2017	Best Song	"Naririnig Mo Ba"	Nominated	
Manila International Film Festival	2025	Best Actress	Song of the Fireflies	Won	
MOR Pinoy Music Awards	2015	Best New Artist	Herself	Won	
MOR Pinoy Music Awards	2016	Female Artist of the Year	"'Di Mapaliwanag"	Won	
MOR Pinoy Music Awards	2019	Female Artist of the Year	"Panaginip"	Nominated	
Muse Creative Awards	2023	Video – Music Video	"Imagine More"	Platinum	
Muse Creative Awards	2023	Video – TV Ad Campaign	"Imagine More"	Platinum	
Muse Creative Awards	2023	Branded Content – Entertainment	"Imagine More"	Platinum	
Music Rank Extra Awards	2019	Asia's Favorite	Herself	Won	
Music Rank Extra Awards	2019	Top Social Artist	Herself	2nd	
Music Rank Extra Awards	2020	Asian Artist of the Year	Herself	2nd	
Myx Music Awards	2016	Favorite Media Soundtrack	"Nothing's Gonna Stop Us Now" (with Daniel Padilla)	Nominated	
Myx Music Awards	2017	Favorite Media Soundtrack	"Something I Need" (with Piolo Pascual)	Nominated	
Myx Music Awards	2017	Favorite Collaboration	"Throwback" (feat. KZ Tandingan)	Nominated	
Myx Music Awards	2017	Favorite Remake	"Baby I Love Your Way" (with Harana)	Nominated	
Myx Music Awards	2018	Mellow Video of the Year	"Naririnig Mo Ba"	Nominated	
Myx Music Awards	2018	Female Artist of the Year	Herself	Nominated	
Myx Music Awards	2019	Female Artist of the Year	Herself	Nominated	
NCAF Seal of Excellence Awards	2015	Top Filipino Excellence Award: Outstanding Female Performing Artist of the Year	Herself	Won	
NCAF Seal of Excellence Awards	2015	Gawad Musika Award: Outstanding Female Performing Artist of the Year	Herself	Won	
New York Festivals TV & Film Awards	2023	Original Music: Promotion/Open & IDs (Craft: Promotion/Open & ID)	"Imagine More"	Silver	
PPOP Awards	2018	Pop Musical Ads Theme Song of the Year	"Ang Sarap, Ang Saya Maging Pilipino"	Won	
Profiles of Excellence Awards	2019	Best Female Global Asian Vocalist	Herself	Won	
Push Awards	2015	Push Play Best Newcomer	Herself	Nominated	
Push Awards	2015	Awesome Song Cover Performance	"Break Free"	Nominated	
Push Awards	2017	Push Song Cover of the Year	"Stone Cold"	Won	
Push Awards	2020	Push Song Cover of the Year	"A Whole New World" (with Darren Espanto)	Won	
Push Awards	2022	Push Music Artist of 2022	Herself	Nominated	
RAWR Awards	2018	Favorite Performer	Morissette is Made	Won	
RAWR Awards	2022	Favorite Performer	Herself	Nominated	
RAWR Awards	2022	Song of the Year	"Gusto Ko Nang Bumitaw"	Nominated	
Star Awards for Music	2015	Female Concert Performer of the Year	This is Me	Nominated	
Star Awards for Music	2015	New Female Recording Artist of the Year	Morissette	Won	
Star Awards for Music	2015	Song of the Year	"Akin Ka Na Lang"	Nominated	
Star Awards for Music	2017	Concert of the Year	Birit Queens	Won	
Star Awards for Music	2018	Female Concert Performer of the Year	Morissette is Made	Won	
Star Awards for Music	2020	Female Concert Performer of the Year	A Lani Morissette Musical Journey	Won	
Star Awards for Music	2020	Concert of the Year	A Lani Morissette Musical Journey	Nominated	
Star Awards for Music	2022	Female Recording Artist of the Year	"Love You Still"	Nominated	
Star Awards for Music	2022	People's Choice Award: Music Video of the Year	"Love You Still"	Won	
Star Awards for Music	2023	Album of the Year	Trophy	Nominated	
Star Awards for Music	2023	Pop Album of the Year	Morissette at 14, Vol. 2	Nominated	
Star Awards for Music	2023	Female Recording Artist of the Year	"Shine"	Nominated	
Star Awards for Music	2024 (1)	Female Recording Artist of the Year	"Gusto Ko Nang Bumitaw"	Won	
Star Awards for Music	2024 (1)	Revival Recording of the Year	"Gusto Ko Nang Bumitaw"	Nominated	
Star Awards for Music	2024 (2)	Female Recording Artist of the Year	"Something Only We Know (Her Version)"	Nominated	
Star Cinema Awards	2015	Favorite Movie Themesong	"Nothing's Gonna Stop Us Now"	Won	
Star Cinema Awards	2015	Favorite Album	Morissette	Nominated	
Star Cinema Awards	2015	Breakthrough Artist	Herself	Nominated	
Star Cinema Awards	2015	Favorite Song	"'Di Mapaliwanag"	Nominated	
The Honors	2019	Achiever of the Year in Extreme Vocals	Herself	Won	
Village Pipol Choice Awards	2019	Performer of the Year	"Shine"	Nominated	
Village Pipol Choice Awards	2020	Performer of the Year	Herself	Nominated	
Village Pipol Choice Awards	2022	OPM Song of the Year	"Gusto Ko Nang Bumitaw"	Nominated	
Wish 107.5 Music Awards	2016	Wish Female Artist of the Year	Herself (Note: Received ₱100 thousand for her chosen beneficiary, Home for the Angels.)	Won	
Wish 107.5 Music Awards	2016	Wishers' Choice - Female Artist of the Year	Herself	Won	
Wish 107.5 Music Awards	2016	Best Wishclusive Performance by a Female Artist	"'Di Mapaliwanag"	Nominated	
Wish 107.5 Music Awards	2016	Wish Original Song of the Year	"'Di Mapaliwanag"	Nominated	
Wish 107.5 Music Awards	2017	Best Wishclusive Collaboration	"I Finally Found Someone" (with Arnel Pineda)	Won	
Wish 107.5 Music Awards	2017	Wish Original Song of the Year by a Female Artist	"Throwback" (Note: Received ₱100 thousand for their chosen beneficiary.) (feat. KZ Tandingan)	Won	
Wish 107.5 Music Awards	2017	Wish Female Artist of the Year	Herself (Note: Received ₱100 thousand for her chosen beneficiary.)	Won	
Wish 107.5 Music Awards	2017	Best Wishclusive Performance by a Female Artist	"Secret Love Song"	Won	
Wish 107.5 Music Awards	2017	Wish Reactor's Choice	"Secret Love Song"	Won	
Wish 107.5 Music Awards	2017	Wishclusive Viral Video of the Year	"Secret Love Song"	Won	
Wish 107.5 Music Awards	2017	Wishclusive Elite Circle †	"Secret Love Song"	Bronze	
Wish 107.5 Music Awards	2017	Wishclusive Elite Circle †	"Against All Odds"	Bronze	
Wish 107.5 Music Awards	2018	Wishclusive Pop Performance of the Year	"Rise Up" (Note: Received ₱100 thousand for her chosen beneficiaries, Sto. Niño Home for the Aged Inc. and Meritxell Children's World Foundation Inc.)	Won	
Wish 107.5 Music Awards	2018	Wish Artist of the Year	Herself	Won	
Wish 107.5 Music Awards	2018	Wish Reactors Choice	"Rise Up"	Won	
Wish 107.5 Music Awards	2018	Wishclusive Elite Circle †	"Chandelier"	Bronze	
Wish 107.5 Music Awards	2018	Wishclusive Elite Circle †	"Against All Odds"	Silver	
Wish 107.5 Music Awards	2018	Wishclusive Elite Circle †	"Secret Love Song"	Gold	
Wish 107.5 Music Awards	2019	Wishclusive Ballad Performance of the Year	"Akin Ka Na Lang" (Note: Received ₱100 thousand for her chosen beneficiary, Meritxell Children's World Foundation Inc.)	Won	
Wish 107.5 Music Awards	2019	Wish Pop Song of the Year	"Panaginip"	Won	
Wish 107.5 Music Awards	2019	Wish Artist of the Year	Herself	Won	
Wish 107.5 Music Awards	2019	Wishers' Choice	Herself	Won	
Wish 107.5 Music Awards	2019	Wishclusive Elite Circle †	"Mahal Naman Kita"	Bronze	
Wish 107.5 Music Awards	2019	Wishclusive Elite Circle †	"I Finally Found Someone"	Bronze	
Wish 107.5 Music Awards	2019	Wishclusive Elite Circle †	"Akin Ka Na Lang"	Bronze	
Wish 107.5 Music Awards	2019	Wishclusive Elite Circle †	"Akin Ka Na Lang"	Silver	
Wish 107.5 Music Awards	2019	Wishclusive Elite Circle †	"Akin Ka Na Lang"	Gold	
Wish 107.5 Music Awards	2019	Wishclusive Elite Circle †	"Against All Odds"	Gold	
Wish 107.5 Music Awards	2019	Wishclusive Elite Circle †	"Secret Love Song"	Platinum	
Wish 107.5 Music Awards	2020	KDR Icon of Music and Philanthropy †	Herself	Won	
Wish 107.5 Music Awards	2020	Wish Collaboration of the Year	"A Whole New World" (Note: Received ₱100 thousand for their chosen beneficiaries, Sto. Niño Home For The Aged, Inc. and Sagip Kapamilya Foundation) (with Darren Espanto)	Won	
Wish 107.5 Music Awards	2020	Wish Ballad Song of the Year	"Diyan Ba Sa Langit" (with Jason Dy)	Nominated	
Wish 107.5 Music Awards	2020	Wishclusive Elite Circle †	"A Whole New World"	Bronze	
Wish 107.5 Music Awards	2020	Wishclusive Elite Circle †	"Akin Ka Na Lang"	Platinum	
Wish 107.5 Music Awards	2020	Wishclusive Elite Circle †	"Akin Ka Na Lang"	Diamond	
Wish 107.5 Music Awards	2020	Wishclusive Elite Circle †	"Secret Love Song"	Diamond	
Wish 107.5 Music Awards	2021	Wishclusive Elite Circle †	"A Whole New World" (with Darren Espanto)	Silver	
Wish 107.5 Music Awards	2022	Wishclusive Pop Performance of the Year	"Phoenix"	Nominated	
Wish 107.5 Music Awards	2022	Wish Pop Song of the Year	"Trophy"	Nominated	
Wish 107.5 Music Awards	2022	Wish Artist of the Year	Herself	Nominated	
Wish 107.5 Music Awards	2022	Wishclusive Elite Circle †	"Against All Odds"	Platinum	
Wish 107.5 Music Awards	2023	Wishclusive Elite Circle †	"I Finally Found Someone"	Silver	
Wish 107.5 Music Awards	2024	Wishclusive Collaboration of the Year	"So Close" (Note: Received ₱100 thousand for their chosen beneficiaries, the Cancer Treatment And Support Foundation and the Philippine Educational Theater Association.) (with Sponge Cola)	Won	
Wish 107.5 Music Awards	2024	Wishclusive Elite Circle †	"Mahal Naman Kita"	Silver	
WorldFest-Houston International Film Festival	2025	Best Actress	Song of the Fireflies	Nominated	

== Other accolades ==
=== Listicles ===
Name of publisher, name of listicle, year(s) listed, and placement result
Publisher	Listicle	Year(s)	Result	Ref.
People Asia	Women of Style and Substance	2018	Included	
