= Jamie Rivera =

Filipino singer (born 1966)

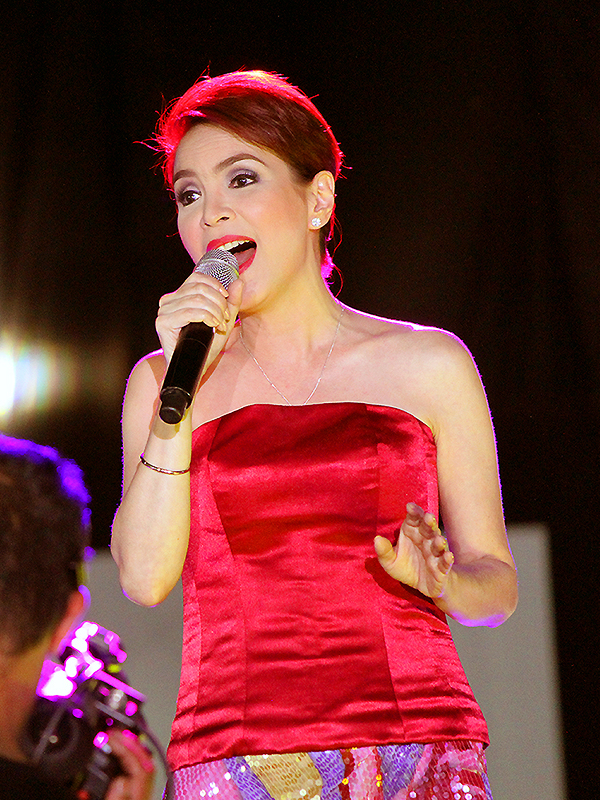

Background information
- Also known as: Jamie Rivera
- Born: Mary Jane Cruz; August 29, 1966 (age 60)
- Origin: Manila, Philippines
- Genres: Gospel; pop; OPM
- Occupations: Singer; songwriter; producer; actress
- Instrument: Vocals
- Years active: 1987–present
- Labels: PolyEast Records (Philippines) (1987–1997, 2001); Warner Records (US) (1987–1998); Warner Music (Worldwide) (1987–1998); Star Music (1996–present); Manila Genesis Entertainment
- Website: Archived 3 March 2008 at the Wayback Machine

Mary Jane Cruz-Mendoza (née Cruz; born August 29, 1966), known professionally as Jamie Rivera, is a Filipino singer, songwriter, record producer, and actress. Commonly referred to as the "Inspirational Diva", she is known for her songs with spiritual and religious themes.

From her post-EDSA Revolution debut album Hey It's Me under PolyEast Records, Rivera has had five gold and two platinum-selling albums issued by PARI. Since 1996, her albums were released by Star Music, a recording company owned by the Philippine media company ABS-CBN Corporation. Rivera has sung to Pope John Paul II, and played the role of Kim in the Miss Saigon musical at the Theatre Royal, Drury Lane, in the West End of London, England. Most recently, she is known for singing the theme song of the Papal Visit 2015 We Are All God's Children. She also met Pope Francis during his Apostolic visit to the Philippines on January 15–19, 2015.

== Family and education ==
Rivera is a Roman Catholic. She is married to JB Mendoza and has a daughter named Reine Mendoza, who was born on December 12, 1996.

She graduated from University of Santo Tomas with a degree in Economics.

== Discography ==
=== Studio and compilation albums ===
- Hey It's Me (debut album) (PolyEast Records, 1987)
- All Out for Love (PolyEast Records, 1988)
- We Can Show the World (PolyEast Records, 1990)
- Greatest Hits (PolyEast Records, 1991)
- Pangako (PolyEast Records, 1993)
- Second Thoughts (PolyEast Records, 1994)
- Once More (Star Music, 1996) Gold award
- OPM Timeless Collection (PolyEast Records, 1997)
- Sa Araw ng Pasko (Star Music, 1998) Platinum award
- Feels So Right (Star Music, 1999) Gold award
- The Story of Jamie Rivera: Ultimate OPM Collection (PolyEast Records, 2001)
- Lord, Heal Our Land (Star Music, 2001) Gold award
- Seasons (Star Music, 2001)
- The Purpose Driven Life (Star Music, 2004) Gold & Platinum awards
- Jamie Rivera... At Her Best (Star Music, 2005)
- Inspirations (Star Music, 2012) Gold award
- Best of Jamie Rivera (Star Music, 2013)
- My Christmas Gift (Star Music, 2013) Gold award
- We Are All God's Children (Star Music, 2015) Gold & Platinum awards
- Hey It's Me, Jamie!: 30th Anniversary Tribute Album (Star Music, 2017)

=== Singles ===
- "Tanging Yaman"
- "Aking Dasal" – Tagalog version of the song The Prayer (duet with Robert Seña)
- "I've Fallen for You"
- "Totoo Ba?"
- "Hey It's Me"
- "Pangako"
- "Pangarap Ka Na Lang Ba? (Mahal Naman Kita)"
- "Paniwalaan Mo"
- "Paano Na"
- "I'm Sorry"
- "Kung Maghihintay Ka Lamang"
- "People Alone"
- "Sino Ako? (Hiram sa Diyos)"
- "Awit Para sa 'Yo"
- "Sige Na Naman (Crush Din Kita)" (1988)
- "Will of the Wind"
- "Love Is All That Matters"
- "Jubilee Song" (with 92 AD)
- "Tell the World of His Love" (composition and theme for World Youth Day 1995)
- "Sa 'Yo Lamang"
- "Panalangin sa Pagiging Bukas Palad"
- "Kuya Pedro" (theme for the Canonization of Pedro Calungsod), composed by Rivera in 2012
- "Araw-Araw Pasko"
- "Ilang Pasko"
- "Pasko Na, Sinta Ko"
- "Purpose Driven Life"
- "Stella Maris"
- "My First and Last Love"
- "Pagispan Mo Ang Boto Mo"
- "Joy To The World"
- "Disyembre Na Naman"
- "My Valentine"
- "And You Will Call Her Mother"
- "Christmas Will Always Be Christmas"
- "I'll Be There"
- "Points of View" (duet with Manilyn Reynes)
- "We Are All God's Children" (composition approved by the Holy See, performed during the Pope Francis' visit to the Philippines)
- "Our Dearest Pope"
- "Papa Francisco, Mabuhay Po Kayo!"
- "Heal Our Land" (music video version of this song is directed by Mark Meily)
- "Only Selfless Love" (performed during the 4th World Meeting of Families)
- "O Hesus, Hilumin Mo"
- "A Smile in Your Heart"
- "Inang Maria"
- "Sana Minsan"
- "Bakit Ikaw Pa?"
- "Letting Go"
- "Second Thoughts" (duet with Rannie Raymundo)
- "Sa Araw ng Pasko" (collaboration with Jeffrey Hidalgo, James Coronel, Pops Fernandez, Rocky Lazatin, Ladine Roxas, Richard Marten, Tootsie Guevarra, Carol Banawa, Lindsay Custodio, Jolina Magdangal and Roselle Nava)
- "Pilipino Sa Turismo ay Aktibo" (theme for the Philippine Tourism Authority's B.E.S.T. in the Philippines campaign) (collaboration with Gary Valenciano, Ai-Ai delas Alas, Heart Evangelista, Piolo Pascual, Dianne dela Fuente, Ella Mae Saison, Angelica Jones, Vhong Navarro, Lito Camo, Sandwich, April Boy Regino, Aliyah Parcs, Karel Marquez, Gloc-9, Marinel Santos, Jonathan Badon, Michael Cruz, Michelle Ayalde, Erik Santos, Frenchie Dy, Sheryn Regis, Raki Vega, Akafellas, Johann Escañan, Divo Bayer, and King Girado)
- "Pasko Para Sa Lahat" (collaboration with Manilyn Reynes, Carlo Orosa, Ogie Alcasid, Janet Arnaiz, Ana Roces, Francis M, Keno, Jo Anne Lorenzana, Keempee de Leon, Lara de Leon, Viktoria, Eddie K, and Tateng "TK" Katindig)
- "Sana Naman, Taumbayan" (collaboration with Ryan Cayabyab, Jed Madela, Robert Seña, Isay Alvarez-Seña, Maysh Baay, Myke Salomon, Jay Durias, Mitch Valdez, The Company, Mass Appeal Choir, Agot Isidro and Bayang Barrios)
- "Salamat 2016" (collaboration with Yeng Constantino, Janella Salvador, Ylona Garcia, Bailey May, Angeline Quinto, Erik Santos, Kaye Cal, Marion Aunor, Daryl Ong,Bugoy Drilon, Liezel Garcia, Jovit Baldivino, Sue Ramirez, Inigo Pascual, Michael Pangilinan, Jed Madela, Morissette, Klarisse De Guzman, Jolina Magdangal, Juris, Vina Morales, Jona, Migz & Maya, Gloc-9, KZ Tandingan, Piolo Pascual, Kim Chiu, Xian Lim, Enchong Dee, Tim Pavino, Alex Gonzaga, Enrique Gil, Kathryn Bernardo, Daniel Padilla, Vice Ganda)
- "We Heal as One" (collaboration with Iñigo Pascual, Julie Anne San Jose, Jed Madela, Robert Seña, Isay Alvarez-Seña, Mark Bautista, Rita Daniela, Gary Valenciano, Paolo Valenciano, KZ Tandingan, Aicelle Santos, Ogie Alcasid, Menchu Lauchengco, Michael Williams, Alden Richards, Ken Chan, Christian Bautista, Sarah Geronimo, Martin Nievera, Pops Fernandez, Bamboo Mañalac, apl.de.ap, Lani Misalucha, and Lea Salonga)
- "Bayani ng Mundo" (collaboration with Dulce, Kuh Ledesma, Ivy Violan, Bayang Barrios, Kris Lawrence, Esang de Torres and Ladine Roxas)
- "We Give our Yes" (theme for the 500 Years of Christianity in the Philippines)

== Filmography ==
=== Film ===
- Paniwalaan Mo (1993)
- The Breakup Playlist (2015)

=== Television ===
Year	Title	Role
1989	Eat Bulaga!	Herself/Guest Performer
1993–1996	Maalaala Mo Kaya	Various roles
1995–present	ASAP Natin 'To	Herself/Guest Performer
2002	Isang Pamilya Isang Puso Ngayong Pasko: The ABS-CBN 2002 Christmas Special	Herself/Performer
2004	Hataw Na, Pasko Na!: The Star Records Christmas Special	Herself/Performer
2007	Celebrity Duets: Philippine Edition Season 1	Herself/Guest Performer
2010	Diz Iz It!	Herself/Guest Judge
2012	It's Showtime	Herself/Guest Judge
2013	Walang Tulugan with the Master Showman	Herself/Guest
2013	Sarap Diva	Herself/Guest
2013	Goin' Bulilit	Herself/Guest
2013	Bandila	Herself/Guest
2013	The Jon Santos Show	Herself/Guest
2013	The Singing Bee	Herself/Guest Contestant
2013	It's Showtime	Herself/Guest Mentor
2013	ASOP Music Festival	Herself/Guest Judge
2013	Kanta Pilipinas	Herself/Guest Judge
2014	Aquino & Abunda Tonight	Herself/Guest
2014	Kapamilya Magkapiling Tayo Ngayong Pasko: The 2014 ABS-CBN Christmas Special	Herself/Performer
2014	Shoptalk	Herself/Guest
2014	Good Morning Club	Herself/Guest
2014	MOMents	Herself/Guest
2014	The Ryzza Mae Show	Herself/Guest Judge
2014	ASOP Music Festival	Herself/Guest Judge
2015	Happy Truck ng Bayan	Herself/Guest Performer
2015	It's Showtime	Herself/Guest Performer
2015	It's Showtime	Herself/Guest Celebrity
2015	Eat Bulaga!	Herself/Guest Judge
2015	Mars	Herself/Guest
2015	Happy Wife, Happy Life	Herself/Guest
2015	Rising Stars Philippines	Herself/Guest Judge
2015	ASOP Music Festival	Herself/Guest Judge
2015	Star Myx	Herself/Guest
2015	Myx Daily Top 10	Herself/Guest
2015	3-in-1	Herself/Guest
2015	The Jon Santos Show	Herself/Guest
2015	Kris TV	Herself/Guest
2015	Umagang Kay Ganda	Herself/Guest Performer
2015	Aquino & Abunda Tonight	Herself/Guest
2015	The Ryzza Mae Show	Herself/Guest
2015	Mornings @ ANC	Herself/Guest
2015	This is My Story, This is My Song	Herself/Guest
2016	Myx Daily Top 10	Herself/Guest
2016	Myx Moods	Herself/Guest
2016	Family Feud	Herself/Contestant
2016	Rated K	Herself/Guest
2016	Real Talk	Herself/Guest
2016	Siete Palabras	Herself/Guest Performer
2016	Eat Bulaga!	Herself/Guest Judge
2016	Eat Bulaga!	Herself/Guest Contestant
2016	Umagang Kay Ganda	Herself/Guest Performer
2017	I Can See Your Voice (season 1)	Herself/Guest
2017	Soundtrip!	Herself/Guest
2017	The Lolas' Beautiful Show	Herself/Guest
2017	Tonight with Boy Abunda	Herself/Guest
2017	Magandang Buhay	Herself/Guest
2017	Umagang Kay Ganda	Herself/Guest Performer
2017	Myx Daily Top 10	Herself/Guest
2017	Eat Bulaga!	Herself/Guest Judge
2018	It's Showtime	Herself/Guest Judge
2018	Tonight with Arnold Clavio	Herself/Guest
2019	It's Showtime	Herself/Guest Judge
2019	It's Showtime	Herself/Guest Performer
2019	Umagang Kay Ganda	Herself/Guest Performer
2021	ASAP Natin 'To	Herself/Guest Performer
2025	It's Showtime	Herself/Guest Performer

=== Other ===
- Liwanag ng Mundo : Simbahan at Pamilya (2003, Direct-to-Video)

== Controversies ==
=== "My Life In Your Hands" ===
In August 2003, Jamie was accused for incorrect lyrics involving one of her songs, "My Life In Your Hands" from her 2001 album, Seasons. The song was composed by Kathy Troccoli and Bill Montvilo, and originally performed by Troccoli on her self-titled album in 1994. In Jamie's version of that song, the lyrics were eventually changed, including the words "People" replacing "Keeping" and "Love" replaces "Hope" in the chorus, and the word "Stone" replacing "Lord" in the coda. In addition, Careers-BMG Music Publishing (the song was published by Emily Boothe, Inc., a Reunion Music Group division, in 1993; BMG Music acquired Reunion outright in 1995, and was subsequently acquired by Universal Music Publishing Group in 2007, now known as Universal Music-Careers) and Floating Note Music, publishers of that song, had not granted a master licence for inclusion of the song in the album released by her label, Star Music.

In addition, they eventually misspelled the composers' names in the album's liner notes. Narciso Chan, the sales and marketing director of BMG Pilipinas (now Sony Music Philippines), the Philippine arm of BMG Music Publishing, says that the incorrect lyrics, the misspelling of the song's composers and uncrediting of the publishers of the song "My Life In Your Hands" is 'blatantly illegal' under the United States copyright laws as the song was protected under a United States copyright, as the copyright was held at BMG's Nashville office. Nixon Sy, Star Music's assistant marketing director, did not receive the letter from Mr. Chan and the company had declined to comment. After negotiations with BMG Music in both Manila and Nashville along with Mr. Montvilo's publisher Floating Note Music in New York, Star Music's VP for operations Annabelle Regaldo, managing director Enrico Santos and marketing director Heinrich Ngo said that her album Seasons will be reissued with correct lyrics of the song "My Life In Your Hands" in October 2003, with the correction of the song composers' names and inclusion of the publisher's credits in the album's liner notes, as well as three additional tracks for the 2003 re-release of the album.
