= Morissette (singer) =

Filipino singer and songwriter (born 1996)

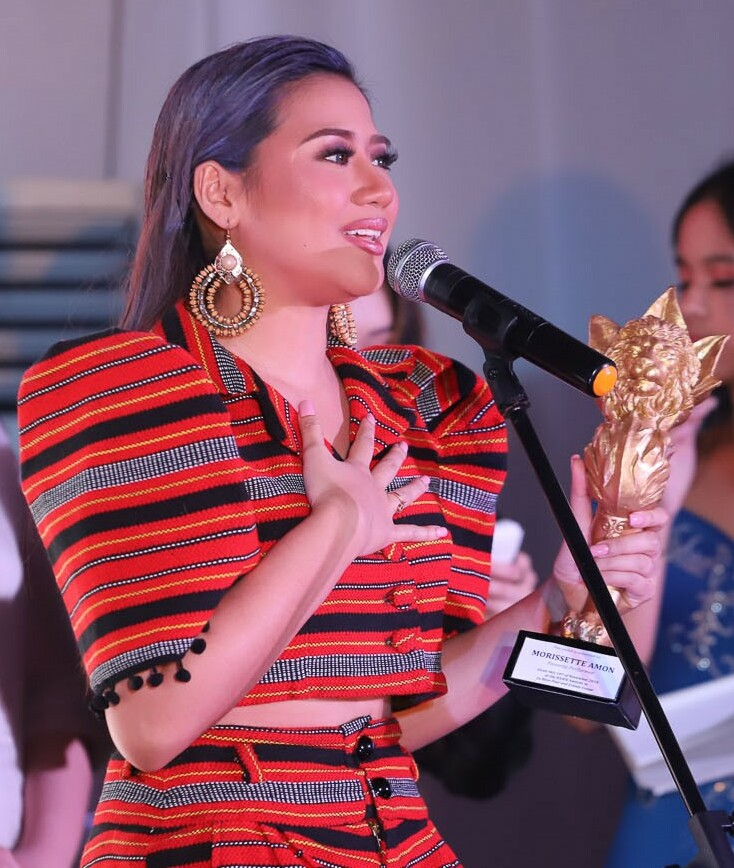
- Morissette in 2018
- Born: Johanne Morissette Daug Amon; June 2, 1996 (age 30); Minglanilla, Cebu, Philippines
- Occupations: Singer; songwriter
- Years active: 2010–present
- Works: Discography
- Spouse: Dave Lamar (m. 2021)
- Awards: Full list
- Musical career
- Genres: OPM; pop; R&B; ballad
- Labels: Star Music; Underdog Music PH; Waterwalk Records

Signature
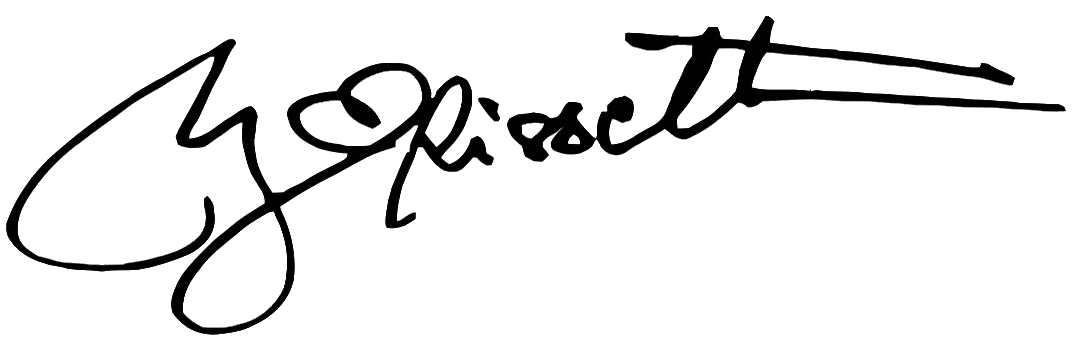

Johanne Morissette Daug Amon (/ˌmɒrɪˈsɛt/ MORR-ih-SET; born June 2, 1996) is a Filipino singer and songwriter nicknamed in the press "Asia's Phoenix". She gained notice as a runner-up in TV5's Star Factor at age 14 and made her theatrical debut in 2012 as Mitchie Torres in Repertory Philippines' adaptation of Disney's Camp Rock. She received wider notice as a semi-finalist in the first season of ABS-CBN's The Voice of the Philippines (2013). She has a wide vocal range and has used the whistle register in some songs.

In 2015, Morissette released her self-titled debut album. It was certified Platinum by the Philippine Association of the Record Industry. In 2016, she staged her first major solo concert Morissette at the Music Museum in Manila. In 2017, she co-hosted Bolt of Talent with American singer Michael Bolton, which aired on Star World and Fox TV. She represented the Philippines in 2017 and 2018 at Asia Song Festival in South Korea. In 2018, she headlined her first concert tour titled Morissette Is Made, which made its first stop at the Araneta Coliseum. In 2019, for Disney, she and Darren Espanto sang "A Whole New World" for the Philippine release of the live-action film Aladdin.

In 2020, she and Bolton were co-mentors for AXN Asia's reality singing competition, Asian Dream. In 2021, Morissette performed the Philippine national anthem at the Batasang Pambansa during the State of the Nation Address. The same year, she released an EP of her own songs, Signature. Among her tours, in 2022, she toured with Christian Bautista and Erik Santos in the US as "Threelogy". In 2025, she starred in Song of the Fireflies, a musical film, and the following year she starred in the Philippine production of The Notebook.

Her accolades have included two Awit Awards, an Aliw Award, six PMPC Star Awards for Music, and 38 Wish 107.5 Music Awards, the most such awards of any artist.

== Early life and education ==
Johanne Morissette Daug Amon, also known as Morissette, was born on June 2, 1996, in Cebu, Philippines, to her mother Analie Daug and rock musician Amay Amon. She is the oldest child and has one sibling, Jeremy Mattheu Amon. She studied at the Immaculate Heart of Mary Academy in Minglanilla, Cebu. Her name, "Johanne", which is pronounced as "Yohan", was chosen by her father from German composer Johann Sebastian Bach, while "Morissette" was taken from her father's favorite singer, Alanis Morissette. When she was 3 years old, her family discovered her singing the Regine Velasquez song "You Are My Song" with a karaoke machine.

In her first singing contest held by a radio station in Cebu, she sang Christina Aguilera's version of "Reflection". Thereafter she became a frequent singing contestant in Cebu, joining competitions such as Young Star Singing Idol. At 9 years of age, she was a finalist in the Little Division of Little Big Star Cebu and won a contest at the DYKC Awit sa Kabataan 2007 in Gaisano Country Mall at the age of 11. The same year she had a submandibular tumor removed from her neck. She also did front acts in mall tours for Sarah Geronimo and Kim Chiu, among others, in Cebu. Morissette sings in the whistle register in some of her songs and has said that she got this inspiration from the singers Nina Girado and Mariah Carey. Growing up, her other musical influences included Regine Velasquez and Sarah Geronimo.

== Career ==
At the age of 14, Morissette competed on TV5's Talentadong Pinoy. In 2011, she recorded 14 songs by producers Jaye Muller and Ben Patton. These songs were not officially released at the time, but a decade later they were released in two volumes, titled Morissette at 14, on November 20, 2020, and March 21, 2021. Following Talentadong Pinoy, Morissette joined the new Artista Search of TV5, Star Factor, progressing to the finals in Manila. She finished as the first runner-up to Eula Caballero. She subsequently appeared in several TV5 shows, such as Pidol's Wonderland and Kapitan Awesome. Her last project was Cassandra: Warrior Angel.

In 2012, Morissette played the lead role of Mitchie Torres in the Repertory Philippines stage adaptation of Disney's Camp Rock. The production ran at Onstage, Greenbelt 1, Makati City, from November 16 until December 16, 2012. Rehearsing and performing in the musical took its toll on Morissette's voice, and she was diagnosed with vocal cord nodules.

=== 2013: The Voice of the Philippines ===
Morissette's work at TV5 supported her family financially, but she wanted to pursue a singing career. She decided to join ABS-CBN's new singing competition, The Voice of the Philippines. During the blind auditions aired in June 2013, Morissette sang "Love On Top", and Sarah Geronimo selected her to be part of her team. Morissette progressed into the live shows, as Geronimo chose her over teammate Lecelle Trinidad when they both sang "No More Tears (Enough Is Enough)" during the show's Battle Rounds.

During the first live show, Morissette sang "Jar of Hearts". She received the highest percentage of votes in Geronimo's team, with 57.16%, and advanced to the next level of the competition. In the second live show, Morissette sang "What About Love", and Geronimo scored her 60% for her performance. Added to her public vote of 50.41%, her total score of 110.41 points advanced her to the semifinals. On the first night of the semifinals in September 2013, Morissette and teammate Klarisse de Guzman both sang "The Voice Within" as a battle song. Morissette sang "Who You Are" on the second night, and at the end of the show, she was eliminated after losing to de Guzman.

==== Performances ====
Stage	Song	Original artist	Date	Result
Blind Audition	"Love On Top"	Beyoncé	June 23, 2013	1 chair turned (Default to Sarah Geronimo)
Battle Rounds	"No More Tears" (vs. Lecelle Trinidad)	Barbra Streisand and Donna Summer	July 28, 2013	Saved by Sarah
Live Top 24	"Jar of Hearts"	Christina Perri	August 25, 2013	Saved by Public Vote
Live Top 16	"What About Love"	Heart	September 8, 2013	Saved by Sarah and Public Vote (110.41 points)
Live (Semifinals)	"The Voice Within" (vs. Klarisse de Guzman)	Christina Aguilera	September 21, 2013	Eliminated
Live (Semifinals)	"Who You Are"	Jessie J	September 22, 2013	Eliminated

=== 2014: ABS-CBN ===
In 2014, Morissette started recurring appearances on ABS-CBN's ASAP. For the drama series Moon of Desire, she recorded the self-titled theme song by Trina Belamide. This was followed by more theme songs on ABS-CBN's "teleseryes". Together with her former teammate from The Voice of the Philippines, de Guzman, and Angeline Quinto, she was given a segment on ASAP called "HD" or "Homegrown Divas". She also started performing in It's Showtime, ABS-CBN's noontime variety show, where she was allowed to sing solo numbers. This show provided Morissette an opportunity to demonstrate both her singing and dancing skills. She was accused of lip-syncing Ariana Grande's "Break Free" after the hosts of the show praised her for keeping her voice steady while dancing across the stage. Morissette denied the accusation.

In May 2014, Morissette gave her first solo concert entitled This Is Me, which doubled as her 18th birthday celebration. Her repertoire included international pop hits as well as those from Philippine singers such as Regine Velasquez. She even paid homage to her namesake by singing her own versions of Alanis Morissette's "Ironic" and "You Learn". During this concert, she announced that she had joined Star Records, with which she signed a one-year contract in August 2014. Morissette performed with Jessie J at her concert on July 14, 2014, at Smart Araneta Coliseum. She was interviewing Jessie J for the music channel Myx and mentioned that she sang one of her songs on The Voice of the Philippines. Jessie J then requested Morissette to sing for her, and Morissette sang part of "Who You Are". Jessie J immediately invited Morissette to join her onstage during her concert.

In September 2014, Morissette performed in the 2014 finals of Himig Handog P-Pop Love Songs, the country's most popular songwriting and music video competition. She interpreted "Akin Ka Na Lang", an original song written by Francis Louis "Kiko" Salazar which was chosen as one of the 15 finalists out of more than 6,000 entries submitted since November 2013. In November 2014, Morissette sang several Disney songs in a two-day concert entitled Disney in Concert: A Tale as Old as Time, along with Sam Concepcion and Karylle, accompanied by the ABS-CBN Philharmonic Orchestra under the direction of Gerard Salonga.

=== 2015–2019: Morissette ===
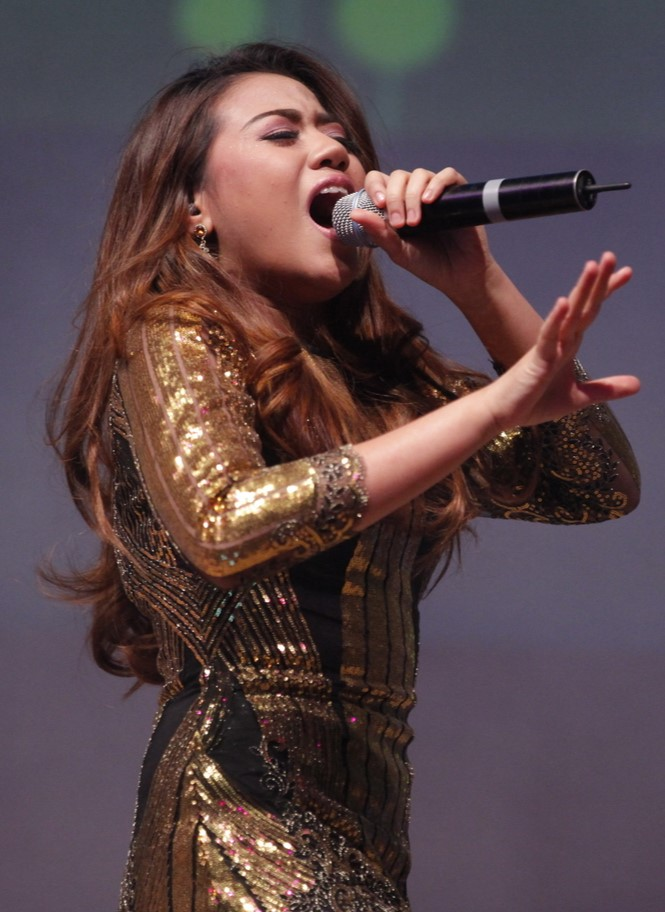
Morissette performing in 2015

In 2015, Filipino Star Magazine called her "The Next Big Diva". In March 2015, Star Records released her first studio album, self-titled Morissette. The carrier single "'Di Mapaliwanag" was used as a theme song for the Koreanovela My Lovely Girl on Kapamilya ABS CBN and won as Asianovela Themesong of the Year (2015). The album was launched at Shangri-La Plaza EDSA in April 2015 and eventually reached platinum certification in the Philippines. Morissette won "Best New Artist" at the MOR Pinoy Music Awards. Morissette sang theme songs for Star Cinema movies, including a cover of Starship's hit song "Nothing's Gonna Stop Us Now" with Daniel Padilla for the film Crazy Beautiful You and "Someone's Always Saying Goodbye" for the film You're Still the One. In 2016, she performed a duet with Piolo Pascual entitled "Something I Need" for the movie Everything About Her.

In mid-2015, she was cast in Chuva Choo Choo – Mr. Kupido Musicale, featuring the songs of Vehnee Saturno. She played Darla, a talented amateur singer hoping to break into the entertainment business. Morissette was awarded as the Best New Female Recording Artist at the 7th PMPC Star Awards for Music. She was also recognized by the National Consumer Affairs Foundation's Seal of Excellence Awards as the 2015 Outstanding Female Performing Artist of the Year through a Gawad Musika Award and a Top Filipino Excellence Award. In December 2015, she performed a mini-concert at the 26th St. Bistro, Coffee Bean and Tea Leaf, produced by Stages Sessions.

Morissette was also part of the concert Confessions: A Night of Secrets, Stories and Songs in February 2016 at the Music Museum by Stages Sessions. At the 1st Wish 107.5 Music Awards (WMA) she won Female Artist of the Year and Wishers' Choice - Female Artist of the Year. Winners in WMA's major award categories were allowed to choose beneficiaries of financial assistance worth ₱100 thousand. Morissette's choice was Home for the Angels in Santa Ana, Manila, a crisis center for abandoned infants. For the second time, she performed in the 2016 Himig Handog P-Pop Love Songs competition. She interpreted "Diamante", composed by Jungee Marcelo. She won Female Artist of the Year at ABS-CBN's M.O.R. Pinoy Music Awards in 2016.

Her first major concert was at the Music Museum on August 13, 2016. Her performance of "I'm Here" from the musical The Color Purple garnered praise from Lea Salonga. Prior to the concert, Morissette stated that she wanted to break free from her stereotype as a belter and show her dance skills and her softer side.

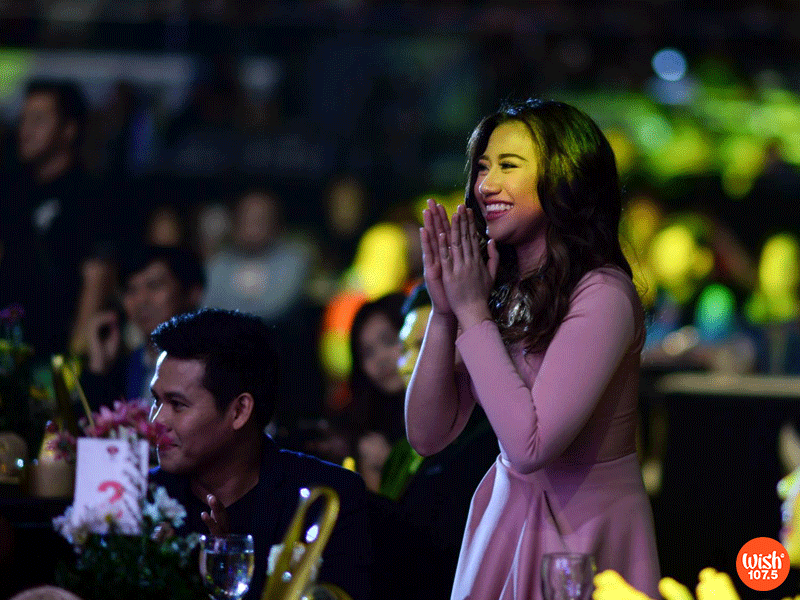
Morissette at the 2nd Wish Music Awards in 2017

In 2016, Morissette was a regular on ABS-CBN's Sunday afternoon show ASAP as one of the "Birit Queens". The group staged its first concert in March 2017 at the SM Mall of Asia Arena, followed by shows in Abu Dhabi, Canada, and United States. The group disbanded in late 2017. In the same year, she co-hosted with Bolton a talent-search show called Bolt of Talent on STAR World Asia and Fox TV. She also topped the 2017 2nd Wish 107.5 Music Awards with a total of eight awards, more than any other artist nominated. She won all six categories in which she was nominated and joined the Wishclusive Elite Circle with two Bronze Awards for her version of Mariah Carey's "Against All Odds" and Little Mix's "Secret Love Song". These are awarded to any Wish 107.5 artist garnering at least 10 million YouTube views. Four of her awards were for her cover of "Secret Love Song". As of February 2017, this performance was the first to hit 25 million views on Wish 107.5's YouTube channel, guaranteeing Morissette at least a Silver Wishclusive Elite Circle award at the next WMA.

Morissette has often been referred to as "Asia's Phoenix" since her performance at the 14th Asia Song Festival in Busan, South Korea in September 2017, where she represented the Philippines. She returned to the same festival to represent the Philippines in the succeeding 15th Asia Song Festival in Busan in October 2018. She was the first Filipino artist to have her own V Live channel, a popular South Korean live video streaming service for celebrities. In February 2018, at Morissette's concert "Made", Regine Velasquez joined her for a duet of "Akin Ka Na Lang". Morissette's performance of Secret Love Song garnered over 100 million views on Wish's YouTube channel, the first time a female OPM singer reached that milestone. In August and October, Morissette experienced vocal problems and was advised to observe strict vocal rest, interfering with some concerts. She has said that she needed steroids to be able to perform. In November 2018, she was included in and served as the sole Filipino mentor and judge in the Filipino reality show Hello K-Idol.

In 2019, Morissette and Darren Espanto recorded the song "A Whole New World" for Disney's Philippine release of the live-action film adaptation of Aladdin. Later that year, Morissette was a judge for the Himig Handog 2019 and recorded the song "This Is Christmas" with Ben Adams, released in November 2019.

=== 2020–present: Signature EP; film debut ===
In May 2020, she took part in One Love Asia, an online charity musical event to aid Asia in its fight against COVID-19. In August 2020, Morissette was a judge, with Michael Bolton, in an international talent competition, Asian Dream, of AXN Asia.

In November 2020, Morissette released her first co-written and co-produced single "Love You Still" through the Stages Sessions' label Underdog Music PH, co-written with her husband (then fiancé) Dave Lamar and co-produced with Lamar and Xergio Ramos. In December 2020, she released a music video for the song. Morissette appeared at number 7 on Billboard's Next Big Sound chart. In February 2021, she released another single, "Phoenix", through Underdog, co-written with Lamar and co-produced with Lamar and Ramos.

In May 2021, Morissette released a 25th anniversary recording of "Shine", which reintroduced "Shine's" original lyrics composed by Trina Belamide. At the 2021 State of the Nation Address by the 16th president of the Philippines, Rodrigo Duterte, on July 26, 2021, at the Session Hall, Batasang Pambansa Complex, Morissette sang the Philippine national anthem. In August 2021, Morissette released an EP, Signature, with her lead single "Trophy". This was her first EP as a singer-songwriter and co-producer along with Lamar and Ramos and was released under Underdog PH. The EP held the highest position achieved by an OPM artist on iTunes USA in 2021. In October 2021, Morissette became part of the Christian music label from Sony Music Philippines, Waterwalk Records. She then released her first single from that record label, "Waterwalk", written by Jungee Marcelo.

Morissette celebrated her tenth anniversary in the music industry through a virtual concert titled "Phoenix", held on KTX on January 23–24, 2022. The concert highlighted her performances through the years. In February 2022, Morissette's rendition of "Gusto Ko Nang Bumitaw" appeared on the soundtrack of the TV series The Broken Marriage Vow. It won the "Best Theme Song (or Title Theme)" award at the Asian Academy Creative Awards for the Philippines and was nominated for the grand finals. In April and November 2022, Morissette, Christian Bautista, and Erik Santos toured together as "Threelogy" in the US. In August 2022, Morissette released her first English-Bisaya track entitled "Undangon Ta Ni", under Underdog, composed and produced by Cebu-based songwriters Relden Campanilla, Carlisle Tabanera, and Ferdinand Aragon, along with Morissette and Lamar. Her rendition of Christian Bautista's "Colour Everywhere" was released in October 2022.

In December 2024, Morissette performed a two-night solo concert at Hong Kong Disneyland. She made her feature film debut in 2025 as Alma Taldo, the female protagonist of the musical film Song of the Fireflies. The film was shown on March 6, 2025, at the TCL Chinese Theatre in Hollywood, Los Angeles, California, as part of the 2nd Manila International Film Festival; she received the festival's Best Actress award. The film was also screened at the 58th WorldFest-Houston International Film Festival in May 2025, where Morissette was nominated for Best Actress. The film was released in theatres in the Philippines in June 2025. She headlined a solo concert titled Ember at the Smart Araneta Coliseum on October 28, 2025.

Morissette returned to theatre as Middle Allie in the musical The Notebook in the Philippine production in September 2026. A review in ABS-CBN commented, "Morissette is at the center of what makes this production soar. Her performance is outstanding not only vocally but, perhaps more surprisingly, as an actor. She stole the show with “My Days” ... effortlessly sung".

== Personal life ==
Morissette and Dave Lamar were married on June 28, 2021. They had met nine years earlier. Both both appeared on The Voice of the Philippines season 1 in 2013. Morissette stated on their YouTube wedding video: "it was so hard trying to keep this a secret for the past several months, but we're finally Free!" Morissette's parents did not approve of the relationship, and Morissette was estranged from them for five years.

== Artistry ==
=== Influences ===
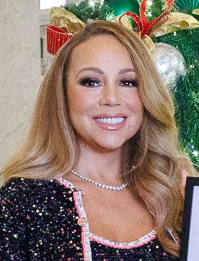
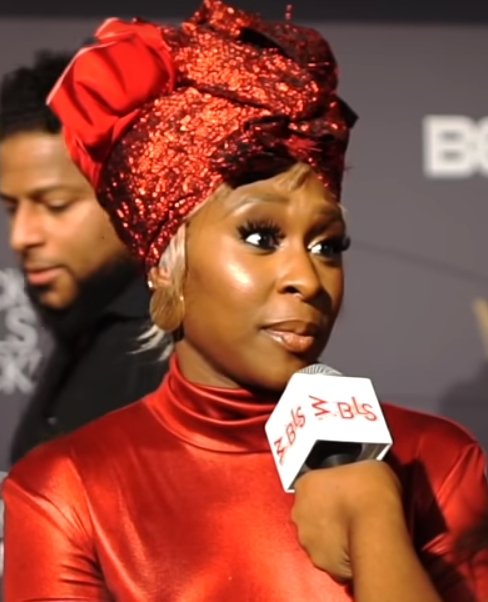
Morissette's major influences include Mariah Carey (left) and Cynthia Erivo (right).

Morissette has stated in an interview that Mariah Carey served as an inspiration to develop her skill in singing in the whistle register and generally admires Carey's vocal performances; she has also credited the influence of Shoshana Bean, Cynthia Erivo, Chandler Moore and Tasha Cobbs.

=== Vocal character ===
Morissette reportedly has a five-octave vocal range, including the whistle register. She has been variously described as a power belter and a soprano. In the Philippine Daily Inquirer, critic Joseph Atilano praised Morissette's "very versatile singing voice ... flawless vocal registry [and] awe-inspiring vocal range".

== Awards and nominations ==
The accolades for Morissette's music and performances have included two Awit Awards, an Aliw Award, six PMPC Star Awards for Music, and 38 Wish 107.5 Music Awards, the most such awards of any artist. She also won the Best Actress award at the 2nd Manila International Film Festival for her performance in Song of the Fireflies and received a nomination for the same role at the 58th WorldFest-Houston International Film Festival.

== Discography ==
Studio albums

- Morissette (2015)
- Morissette at 14, Vol 1 (2020)
- Morissette at 14, Vol 2 (2021)

Extended plays

- Signature (2021)
- Signature: Live! (2021)

== Filmography ==
=== Film ===
Key
†	Denotes films that have not yet been released

Morissette's film credits
Title	Year	Role(s)	Director	Notes	Ref.
Song of the Fireflies	2025	Alma Taldo	King Palisoc		

=== Television ===
Morissette's television credits
Year	Title	Role	Notes	Ref(s)
2007	Ysabella	Duwendita	Special participation	
2010	Star Factor	Herself	Contestant	
2010	P.O.5	Herself	Performer	
2011	Hey it's Saberdey!	Herself	Performer	
2011	Rod Santiago's The Sisters	Young Carlota	Cameo	
2012	Sunday Funday	Herself	Performer	
2012	Pidol's Wonderland	Myrna	Episode: "Isay Is-is"	
2012	Pidol's Wonderland	Tracy	Episode: "Buhok ni Barbara"	
2012	Nandito Ako	Denise	Guest cast	
2012	Enchanted Garden	Cora	Special participation	
2012	Kapitan Awesome	Mhay Sayad	Main cast	
2012	Happy Yipee Yehey!	Herself	Guest	
2013	Cassandra: Warrior Angel	Kristel	Supporting cast	
2013	The Voice of the Philippines	Herself	Contestant	
2013	ASAP	Herself	Mainstay Performer	
2014	It's Showtime	Herself	Performer	
2014	GGV	Herself	Guest	
2015	GGV	Herself	Guest	
2016	Magandang Buhay	Herself	Guest	
2017	Asia Song Festival	Herself	Performer	
2017	Bolt of Talent	Herself	Host; with Michael Bolton	
2018	Asia Song Festival	Herself	Performer	
2018	Hello K-Idol	Herself	Mentor and Judge	
2019	Idol Philippines	Herself	Mentor	
2019	Coke Studio Philippines	Herself	Performer	
2019	GGV	Herself	Guest	
2019	Magandang Buhay	Herself	Guest	
2019	Himig Handog	Herself	Judge	
2020	Asian Television Awards	Herself	Performer	
2020	One Love Asia	Herself	Performer	
2020	Asian Dream	Herself	Resident Judge, Mentor, and Host; with Michael Bolton	
2021	PoPinoy	Herself	Guest Judge	
2022	I Can See Your Voice	Herself	Guest	
2022	Magandang Buhay	Herself	Guest	
2022	It's Showtime	Herself	Performer	
2022	Miss Universe Philippines 2022	Herself	Performer	
2022	Sing Galing Kids	Herself	Judge	
2025	It's Showtime	Herself	Performer	
2025	Eat Bulaga!	Herself	Performer	
2025	Rainbow Rumble	Herself	Contestant	

=== Stage ===
Morissette's theatre credits
Year(s)	Production	Theater	Role(s)	Notes	Ref(s)
2012	Camp Rock: The Musical	OnStage Theater	Mitchie Torres	Repertory Philippines' stage adaptation of Disney's Camp Rock	
2015	Chuva Choo Choo - Mr. Kupido Musicale	Power Mac Center Spotlight	Darla	Filipino musical inspired by the compositions of Vehnee Saturno	
2026	The Notebook	Samsung Performing Arts Theater in Makati City	Middle Allie		

=== Music videos ===
Morissette's music video credits
Title	Year	Other performer(s)	Director(s)	Ref(s)
"Akin Ka Na Lang"	2014	Uncredited	Colegio de San Juan de Letran	
"'Di Mapaliwanag"	2015	None	Frank Lloyd Mamaril	
"Someone's Always Saying Goodbye"	2015	None	Unknown	
"Something I Need"	2016	Piolo Pascual	Unknown	
"Diamante"	2016	None	Jane Sotelo	
"Throwback"	2016	KZ Tandingan	John Lozano	
"Unbound"	2016	Marion Aunor; Alex Gonzaga	Frank Lloyd Mamaril	
"Baby I Love Your Way"	2016	Harana	Unknown	
"Naririnig Mo Ba"	2017	None	Miguel Potestades	
"Panaginip"	2018	None	Benedict Mariategue	
"A Whole New World"	2019	Darren Espanto	Unknown	
"Diyan Ba Sa Langit"	2019	Jason Dy	Frank Lloyd Mamaril	
"This Is Christmas"	2019	Ben Adams	Jiggy Gregorio	
"Love You Still"	2020	None	Jason Max	
"Phoenix"	2021	None	Jason Max	
"Shine (25th Anniversary Version)"	2021	None	Amiel Kirby Balatas	
"Could You Be Messiah"	2021	None	Dave Lamar	
"Trophy"	2021	None	Patrick Benitez	
"So Close"	2023	Sponge Cola; Nour Hooshmand; Miguel Odron	Ken Tan	

== Concerts ==
=== Headlining ===
List of headlining concerts, with dates, associated albums, venues and number of performances
Title	Date	Associated album(s)	Venue	City	Shows	Ref(s)
This Is Me	May 30, 2014	None	Teatrino, Greenhills	San Juan	1	
Morissette	August 13, 2016	Morissette	Music Museum	San Juan	1	
Morissette: A One Night Concert	June 27, 2017	None	Club Se7en	Dubai	1	
Morissette Is Made	February 20, 2018 – September 2, 2018	None	Araneta Coliseum; Waterfront Cebu City; DWTC; SMX Convention Center Davao	Quezon; Cebu; Dubai; Davao	4	
The Exceptional Morissette	May 12, 2018	None	Alonte Sports Arena	Biñan	1	
The Phoenix Rising: Canada Tour	August 3, 2018 – August 11, 2018	None	Club Regent Event Centre; Toronto Pavilion; Massey Theatre	Winnipeg; Toronto; Vancouver	3	
Morissette	December 14, 2019	None	Thunderbird Resorts	San Fernando	1	
Morissette: On the Go	January 10, 2020	None	KICC	San Fernando	1	
MORISSETTE: Live in Sinulog	January 14, 2022	None	Pacific Grand Ballroom	Cebu	1	
PHOENIX: A 10th Year Anniversary Concert	January 23, 2022 – January 24, 2022	Signature EP	Virtual	Makati (Note: Phoenix was shot and filmed at the Power Mac Spotlight Theater in Makati.)	2	
PHOENIX: The Repeat	February 5, 2022	Signature EP	Virtual	Makati	1	
Morissette Live in Sydney	December 9, 2023	None	Sydney Coliseum Theatre	Sydney	1	
Ember	October 28, 2025	None	Smart Araneta Coliseum	Quezon	1	

=== Co-headlining ===
List of co-headlining concerts, with co-headliners, dates, venues and number of performances
Title	Co-headliner(s)	Date	Venue	City	Shows	Ref(s)
Disney in Concert: Tale as Old as Time	Sam Concepcion; Karylle; ABS-CBN Philharmonic Orchestra	November 8, 2014 – November 9, 2014	CCP Main Theater	Pasay	2	
Powerhouse	Arnel Pineda; Michael Pangilinan	October 28, 2016	The Theater at Solaire	Parañaque	1	
G3	Martin Nievera; Rey Valera	March 4, 2017	PICC Plenary Hall	Pasay	1	
Disney Princess: I Dare to Dream	Lea Salonga; Christian Bautista; Erik Santos and more	March 22, 2017	Mall of Asia Arena	Pasay	1	
Birit Queens	Angeline Quinto; Jona Viray; Klarisse de Guzman	March 31, 2017	Mall of Asia Arena	Pasay	1	
PLATINUM The Concert	Tanya Manalang	May 6, 2017	Newport Performing Arts Theater	Pasay	1	
Birit Queens: The U.S. Tour	Angeline Quinto; Jona Viray; Klarisse de Guzman	May 26, 2017 – June 3, 2017	Silver Legacy; Dorothy Chandler Pavilion; San Jose Civic	Nevada; Los Angeles; San Jose	3	
Unlimited Voices	Jed Madela; Darren Espanto; Joliann Salvado	June 16, 2017	Macias Sports Center	Dumaguete	1	
The Voices	Sam Concepcion; Tim Pavino	April 15, 2018	FD Phoenix Center	Guam	1	
Millennial Voices: Australia Tour	Darren Espanto	July 27, 2018 – July 28, 2018	Club Marconi; PlanetShakers Centre	Sydney; Melbourne	2	
A Lani Morissette Musical Journey	Lani Misalucha	September 22, 2018 – September 23, 2018	Theater at Solaire	Parañaque	2	
Music Is Us	Ice Seguerra; Joey G.	October 12, 2018 – October 21, 2018	Cramton Auditorium; Pechanga Resort; Pittsburg High School; Sam's Town Las Vegas; Saban Theatre	Washington; Temecula; Pittsburg; Las Vegas; Los Angeles	5	
OPM Overload	Ogie Alcasid; Piolo Pascual	April 5, 2019	DWTC	Dubai	1	
Unleashed: BuDaKhel & The Phoenix	Bugoy Drilon; Michael Pangilinan; Daryl Ong	June 28, 2019	OLFU Gymnasium	Cabanatuan	1	
#MovingOnFriday	Jason Dy	September 20, 2019	Al Nasr Leisureland	Dubai	1	
In The Key Of Love	Jej Vinson	February 1, 2020	Waterfront Cebu City	Cebu	1	
Threelogy	Christian Bautista; Erik Santos	April 1, 2022 – April 16, 2022	Grove of Anaheim; M Resort; Bay Area; Federal Way PAEC; Pechanga Resort; Hard Rock Casino	Anaheim; Las Vegas; Pinole; Seattle; Temecula; Atlantic City	6	
The Broken Marriage Vow: The Digital Concert	Angeline Quinto; Kyla; Jona; Gigi de Lana; Fana	April 29, 2022	Virtual	Quezon (Note: TBMV was produced by ABS-CBN Events and filmed at their studios in Quezon City.)	1	
Threelogy 2.0	Christian Bautista; Erik Santos	November 5, 2022 – November 19, 2022	San Mateo Theater; Eisemann Center; Northshore Center; West Springfield Auditorium	San Francisco; Dallas; Chicago; West Springfield	4	
Fly High	Jay R	June 9, 2023 – June 11, 2023	Hawaii Convention Center; Maui Arts and Cultural Center	Honolulu; Maui	2	
Martin & Morissette	Martin Nievera	June 2, 2023 – June 3, 2023	Graton Resort & Casino; Fantasy Springs Resort Casino	Bay Area; Indio	2	
Feels Like Home	Dave Lamar	July 7, 2023	Music Museum	San Juan	1	
