= Frank Lloyd Mamaril =

Filipino film and television director

Frank Lloyd Yalung Mamaril
- Born: November 14, 1985 (age 40); Manila, Philippines
- Occupation: Director
- Years active: 2006–present
- Awards: Concert of the Year – PMPC Star Awards; 2016 Love Catcher; Concert Director of the Year – Asia Leaders Awards; 2018 Special Prize
- Website: Official Website of Frank Lloyd Mamaril

Frank Lloyd Yalung Mamaril (born November 14, 1985) is a Filipino entertainment director and communication professor. He is the principal of his directorial firm FLM Creatives and Productions, handling several projects with the largest broadcasters and producers in the Philippines. He is the TV Director of Miss Universe Philippines 2022.

== Education ==
Mamaril graduated in 2006 with a Bachelor of Arts in Communication Arts from the University of Santo Tomas in Manila. Mamaril was a member of the Tomasian Cable Television where he started directing programs and events in the University of Santo Tomas. He is a professor at the De La Salle-College of Saint Benilde in Manila.

== Career ==
Mamaril started working in ABS-CBN as a production assistant and began directing television programs for Metro Channel. He is best known for TV directing the 2019 Southeast Asian Games Closing Ceremonies, the inaugural Miss Universe Philippines pageant in 2020, the Catholic Bishops Conference of the Philippines-commissioned music video of We Give Our Yes sang by Jamie Rivera for the celebration of the 500-year anniversary of Philippine Christianity, and Freedom: The Regine Velasquez Valentine Concert, which was Velasquez' first major online concert and has been recorded to be the highest-grossing digital concert produced in the Philippines.

Mamaril directed the music video of revived single Makita Kang Muli by Ebe Dancel and Regine Velasquez. He directed Lani Misalucha's 2016 concert entitled Love Catcher at Resorts World Manila, which won PMPC Star Awards Best Concert, beating nominated concerts featuring other top-rated OPM artists Regine Velasquez, Martin Nievera, Gary Valenciano, Sarah Geronimo, Erik Santos, Jed Madela, Angeline Quinto, Kyla, and Darren Espanto. Mamaril directed the 20th anniversary concert of OPM rockband Aegis at the Smart Araneta Coliseum, marketed as 20ble Dekada (Two Decades). He also directed Sue Ramirez in her first major concert at the Music Museum in 2019.

Mamaril directed music videos for singles by other top Filipino artists Vice Ganda, 4th Impact, Janella Salvador, Kim Chiu, Vina Morales, Ronnie Alonte, Jason Dy, Michael Pangilinan, Kakai Bautista, Enchong Dee, Darren Espanto, and Morissette among others.

== Select Accolades ==
Year	Awarding Body	Category	Result
2019	Catholic Mass Media Awards	Best Music Video	Won
2018	Asian Leaders Awards	Concert Director of the Year	Won
2017	Stevie Awards Asia-Pacific	Silver Award for Video Innovation	Won
2016	Star Awards	Concert of the Year	Won
2016	MYX Music Awards	Mellow Music Video	Nominated
2015	Star Awards	Best Music Video	Nominated
2014	Catholic Mass Media Awards	Best Narrative Documentary	Nominated

== Select TV Projects ==
Year	Show	Network
2023	Face 2 Face	TV5
2022	PIE Night Long: PNL Sessions	PIE Channel
2022	Pak! Palong Follow	PIE Channel
2021	Freedom: Regine Velasquez Freedom Valentine Concert	KTX.ph
2021	YouTube Music Night with Jona	ABS-CBN
2020	Miss Universe Philippines 2020	GMA Network
2019	2019 SEA Games Closing Ceremonies	S+A, PTV, TV5, CNN
2018	Mutya ng Pilipinas	ABS-CBN
2018	Pia's Postcards	Metro Channel
2018	Women of Style	Metro Channel
2017	Bantay Bata 20th Anniversary Special	ABS-CBN
2012	Go Negosyo: Big Time!	GMA Network
2011	Dreamdate	Studio 23
