= Cris Villonco =

Filipino actress

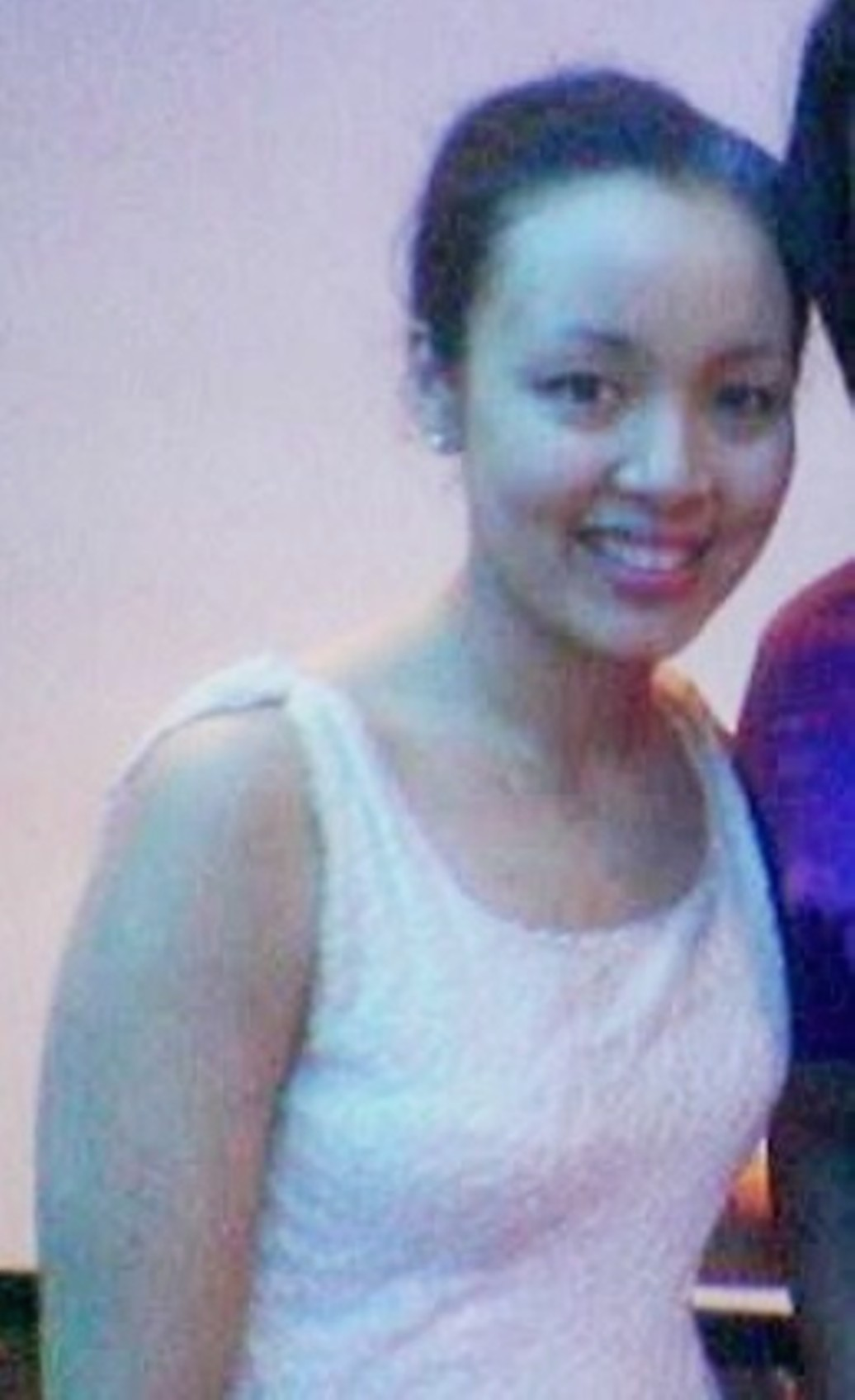
- Born: Anna Cristina Siguion-Reyna Villonco; October 17, 1983 (age 42); Makati, Philippines
- Occupations: Actress, theater actress, singer
- Spouse: Paolo Victor Valderrama (m. 2016)
- Children: 1 High school: International School Manila College: Bachelor of Arts from Sarah Lawrence College with concentrations in music, and economic development (2006)
- Parents: Opap Villonco (father); Monique Siguion-Reyna Villonco (mother)

Anna Cristina "Cris" Siguion Reyna Villonco-Valderrama (Tagalog pronunciation: [bilˈjoŋkɔ baldɛˈɾama]; born October 17, 1983) is a Filipino performance artist whose credits include performances in theater, television, film, recordings, music videos, and advertisements. She is currently associated with Repertory Philippines.

== Career ==
Villonco's singing career began when she was only nine years old, prodded by her grandmother, showbiz industry crusader and former Movie and Television Review and Classification Board (MTRCB) chief Armida Siguion-Reyna. She first gained public attention when she sang the theme song for the ABS-CBN children's television series Hiraya Manawari which was composed by Ryan Cayabyab. In her teens, she rose to prominence as a solo artist after the release of her teen pop song "Crush ng Bayan".

In 2000, she was featured in Time magazine as a Hero for the Planet. The same year, Villonco's debut movie was Ang Dalubhasa with co star the late the King Fernando Poe Jr. or FPJ.

Villonco had her first solo concert Cris at Dish in August 2003, a year which also saw the release of her third album for Viva Records. She graduated from Sarah Lawrence College in May 2006, earning a Bachelor of Arts degree with concentrations in music and economic development. In 2007, she worked for the Centre for Humanitarian Dialogue Manila and Asia Society Philippines. Villonco then returned to theater, appearing in such roles as Hodel in Fiddler on the Roof and Ophelia in Ana Abad Santos-Bitong's steampunk-influenced Hamlet, for Repertory Philippines. In November 2016, she starred as Alison Bechdel in the first international production of Fun Home, which premiered in Manila, alongside Lea Salonga as Helen and Eric Kunze as Bruce. The production is directed by Bobby Garcia. A review in ABS-CBN News said that she delivers "a heartbreaking performance ... often using only her expressive face to suggest the wave of emotions inside her. Her solo 'Telephone Wire', about the pall of what's unsaid between Alison and her father during [an] ill-fated drive dramatically captured the inner turmoil that Villonco lugs with her even after the curtain call."

== Stage and screen performances ==
=== Theatre ===
- Les Misérables (Little Cosette/Eponine) (with Repertory Philippines)
- Jack and the Beanstalk (with Repertory Philippines)
- Larawan (Patsy) (with Musicat)
- Five Women Wearing the Same Dress (Frances) (with Actors, Actors, Inc.),
- Alikabok (Bising Vallejo) (with Musicat)
- Disney's Cinderella Kids (Cinderella) (with Repertory Philippines)
- Fiddler on the Roof (Hodel) (with Repertory Philippines)
- Love Labor's Lost (Lydia Lansing) (with Repertory Philippines)
- Hamlet (Ophelia) (with Repertory Philippines)
- Orosman at Zafira (Zafira) (with Dulaang UP)
- Disney's Mulan Jr. (Mulan) (with Repertory Philippines)
- Romeo and Bernadette (Bernadette) (with Repertory Philippines)
- Legally Blonde the Musical (Vivienne Kensington) (with Atlantis Productions)
- A Little Night Music (Anne Egerman) (with Atlantis Productions)
- The Joy Luck Club (Waverly Jong) (with Repertory Philippines)
- Shakespeare in Hollywood (with Repertory Philippines)
- Simon's Way
- Noli Me Tángere (María Clara) (with Tanghalang Pilipino)
- The Sound of Music (Maria Rainer) (with The Ultimate Entertainment)
- Leading Ladies (Meg) (with Repertory Philippines)
- Jekyll and Hyde (Emma Carew) (with Repertory Philippines)
- Trumpets 4Faith presents Castrato (with Trumpets)
- Walang Sugat (Julia) (with Tanghalang Pilipino)
- D' Wonder Twins of Boac (Viola/Cesar) (with PETA)
- Closer (Alice) (with Red Turnip Theater)
- Mga Ama Mga Anak (Bessie) (with Tanghalang Pilipino)
- Ghost the Musical (Molly Jensen) (with Atlantis Productions)
- Bituing Walang Ningning (Lavinia Arguelles) (with Monica Cuenco)
- Constellations (Marianne) (with Red Turnip) (with Red Turnip Theater)
- Fun Home (Alison Bechdel) (with Atlantis Productions)
- Dear and Unhappy (Josephine Bracken)
- Matilda the Musical (Jennifer Honey) (with Atlantis Productions)

=== Film ===
Year	Title	Role	Note(s)	Ref(s).
2000	Ang Dalubhasa	Sheila		
2014	Where I Am King	Anna	Original title: Hari ng Tondo	
2014	My Big Bossing		"Taktak" segment	
2014	Shake, Rattle & Roll XV	Young Amah	"Ulam" segment	
2015	The Breakup Playlist	Jing		
2015	Everyday I Love You	Helen Locsin		
2017	Ang Larawan	Susan		
2018	Kasal	Michelle		
2020	U-Turn	Monique		

=== Television ===
Year	Title	Role	Note(s)	Ref(s).
2008	Aawitan Kita			
2012; 2014; 2018	Maalaala Mo Kaya		Three episodes: "Cellphone", "Jeep", "Galon"	
2014–2015	Ang Lihim ni Annasandra	Lorraine Armada	88 episodes	

- ASAP
- SOP
- The Ryzza Mae Show
- Eat Bulaga!

== Discography ==
=== Albums ===
- One Smile at a Time (BMG Records) (1997)
- A Girl Can Dream (BMG Records) (2000)
- Cris Villonco (VIVA Records) (2003)

=== Music videos ===
- "Jubilee Song" (National Eucharistic Congress)
- "Hindi Ko Masabi" (1999 MTV Philippines Favorite Female Video Award),
- "It's You, (The Problem Is You)" (BMG)
- "Bago Mapagod ang Puso" (VIVA)
- "Kasali Ka" (Code NGO)

=== Advertisements ===
- Pop Cola Soft Drink, the PLDT Centennial ad campaign, and the 1996 Asia Pacific Economic Cooperation (APEC) ad campaign.
