= Trina Belamide =

Filipino songwriter and record producer

- Born: Katrina Belamide; December 8, 1969 (age 56)
- Occupations: Singer, songwriter, producer
- Years active: 1991–present
- Website: www.trinabelamide.com

Katrina "Trina" Belamide is a Filipino songwriter and record producer. According to the Manila Times she has written songs for most of the Philippines' top recording artists.

== Career ==
Belamide began taking piano lessons at age 8 and started writing songs at 15. In high school and college, she was active in glee clubs as both a singer and songwriter. She said that this exposed her to a wider range of music and helped her make her first contacts in the music industry. She graduated from Ateneo College in 1990 and worked as an advertising copywriter for a short time before deciding to devote her full time to songwriting.

Belamide's professional career in music began in 1991, a year after her graduation in Ateneo, when Joey Albert recorded one of her songs after her friend Moy Ortiz of The Company asked her to submit songs for the said artist.

In 1995, Belamide's song "Tell the World of His Love" won the top prize in the search for the theme song for the 1995 World Youth Day to celebrate the visit of the Pope John Paul II to the Philippines.

In 1996 her song "Shine" won second place in the Metro Manila Popular Music Festival originally performed by Ima Castro, and performed by Sweet Plantado in the Metropop live performances. In 2005 the song again became a hit in the Philippines as sung by Regine Velasquez. In 2021, the song was performed by Morissette on the song's 25th anniversary, with arrangements by Filipino-American music producer Troy Laureta.

In 1999 she won second place in the USA Songwriting Competition held in Fort Lauderdale, Florida.

In 2001 she produced the album Pagbabago, named in honor of the Pagbabago@Pilipinas group which called for social and political reform in the Philippines. She wrote 8 of its 12 songs, which were performed by various artists. Most of the songs expressed the theme of personal responsibility.

In 2005 the restaurant chain Jollibee commissioned her to write a Christmas song for its annual book and toy drive. The song, “Maligaya at MaAga and Pasko”, was recorded by Aga Muhlach, Donna Cruz-Larrazabal, Sarah Geronimo, and Mark Bautista, who donated their services to help the cause. In 2008 she wrote the theme song for the Global Peace Festival, "Where Peace Begins.".

Belamide has written many commercial jingles. She is also a pioneer of the recent trend in the Philippines where couples commission a theme song for their wedding. Her website features a "Song Shop" in which she offers to custom write songs for weddings, gifts, and organizational theme songs.

As of 2017, she is under Star Songs, the publishing division of Star Music.

== Selected works ==
- Dessa:
  - No Less (entry for Asia Song Festival 1999)
- Dianne dela Fuente:
  - Para Sa ‘Yo (Himig Handog sa Bayaning Pilipino 2000)
- Geneva Cruz:
  - No Other Man (Metropop 1998)
- Ima Castro:
  - Shine (Metropop 1996)
- Isay Alvarez:
  - Bagong Mundo (for Johnson & Johnson)
- Jeff Arcilla and Raquel Mangaliag:
  - Tell the World of His Love (for World Youth Day 1995)
- Noisy Neighbors:
  - Life Power (Philippine National Red Cross Songwriting Contest 1999)
- Regine Velasquez:
  - You've Made Me Stronger
  - Sabihin Mo Lang (from the movie soundtrack of “Kailangan Ko’y Ikaw” (Kailangan Ko Ikaw))
- Roselle Nava:
  - Kung Saan May Pangarap (from Ang TV Movie Soundtrack)
- South Border:
  - Walk With Good – co-written by Jay Durias
- Christian Bautista:
  - To Have And To Hold (Claudine Barreto and Raymart Santiago's wedding song)
- The Company:
  - Now That I Have You
- Toni Gonzaga:
  - Doon (theme song of the drama series “Ikaw Sa Puso Ko”)
- Vanna Vanna:
  - Do You (Metropop 1997)
- Radio Veritas anchors
  - Let The Truth Be Known (Veritas846 40th Anniversary Theme Song 2009)
