= Diamante (Morissette song) =

- Official music video thumbnail

Single by Morissette

from the album Himig Handog P-pop Love Songs (2016)
- Language: Tagalog
- Released: January 13, 2016
- Genre: Pop; OPM
- Length: 3:56
- Label: Star Music
- Songwriter: Jungee Marcelo
- Producer: Jungee Marcelo

Music video
- "Diamante" on YouTube

"Diamante" (transl. "Diamond") is a song first recorded by Filipino singer Morissette. This song was among the top 15 finalists for the 2016 Himig Handog: P-Pop Love Songs songwriting competition. The song was written by Jungee Marcelo and was included in the compilation album titled Himig Handog P-pop Love Songs (2016), which was released on January 13, 2016.

== Critical reception ==
Joseph Atilano, a critic from Philippine Daily Inquirer, praised the song for showcasing Morissette's artistic growth and versatility.

== Music video ==
The music video was directed by Jane Sotelo and produced by the San Beda College Alabang. It was released on ABS-CBN Star Music official YouTube channel on April 1, 2016.

== Personnel ==
Credits adapted from YouTube:

- Morissette – vocals
- Jungee Marcelo – songwriter, producer
- Marlon Oliveros – arrangement
- Niño Regalado – drums
- Dante Tañedo – mixing, mastering

== Cover versions ==
In 2019, Antonette Tismo, a contender from The Clash, performed the song to secure her place in the Top 10. In 2023, the 3rd runner-up of Tawag ng Tanghalan (season 6), Jezza Quiogue, performed a medley of Morissette's songs, including "Akin Ka Na Lang", "'Di Mapaliwanag", and "Diamante". Rachell Laylo, the 1st runner-up of Tawag ng Tanghalan (season 4), also performed the song at the 74th anniversary of General Nakar in Quezon Province.

== Accolades ==
Awards and nominations for "Diamante"
Year (Note: Indicates the year of the ceremony. Each year is linked to the article about the awards held that year, wherever possible.)	Award	Category	Result	Ref.
2016	Himig Handog	Best Song	Nominated	
