= Jubilee Song =

Song by Carlo Magno Marcelo
- Written: 1996

"Jubilee Song" is a Christian song from the Philippines, written by Fr. Carlo Magno Marcelo in 1996 for the then-upcoming Great Jubilee event (Filipino: Dakilang Jubileo) of the Catholic Church in the year 2000. The most popular rendition is by Filipino singer Jamie Rivera with the band 92 AD in 2000.

"Jubilee Song" was written by Fr. Marcelo, a priest of the Roman Catholic Archdiocese of Manila, after the Catholic Bishops' Conference of the Philippines commissioned him to compose a song for the Great Jubilee. By June 2000, it had been translated into various languages including Korean, Japanese, Hindi, French, and Chamorro. The song was first released in 1997, performed by Cris Villonco and Jose Mari Chan, as part of the three-year preparation of the Jubilee Year.

In December 1999, Rivera was planning to retire from the music industry the next year. However, a few days before Christmas, her brother Jun convinced her otherwise, suggesting that she record the "Jubilee Song" for the Great Jubilee event of 2000. Rivera recorded the song with the band 92 AD on Christmas Eve 1999, and it was later included by Jun in the Star Music album Iubilaeum A.D. 2000: In the Fullness of Time early next year. Upon its release, Rivera's recording became a hit in the Philippines, and Rivera had since committed herself to promoting the event throughout the year.

Other artists who recorded the song include Donna Cruz (for the Viva Records album Servant of All), Cris Villonco (for the album A Girl Can Dream), Dindin Llarena (for the Alpha Records album The Great Jubilee Album) and Vina Morales (for the OctoArts-EMI Philippines album Songs of Faith and Inspiration).

== In film ==
This song was used in the 2000 Filipino film Tanging Yaman (released thru Star Cinema) during the end credits.
