= Ang Dalubhasa =

2000 Philippine action film by Ronwaldo Reyes

- Theatrical release poster
- Directed by: Ronwaldo Reyes
- Screenplay by: Pablo S. Gomez; Manny Buising
- Story by: Ronwaldo Reyes
- Produced by: Eric M. Cuatico
- Starring: Fernando Poe, Jr.
- Cinematography: Ver P. Reyes
- Edited by: Augusto Salvador
- Music by: Jaime Fabregas
- Production companies: Millennium Cinema; FPJ Productions
- Distributed by: Millennium Cinema
- Release date: January 26, 2000 (Philippines)
- Running time: 115 minutes
- Country: Philippines
- Language: Filipino

Ang Dalubhasa (lit. 'The Expert') is a 2000 Philippine action film starring Fernando Poe Jr., who directed the film under the moniker Ronwaldo Reyes, Nanette Medved and Maritoni Fernandez. The film was a vehicle for Medved's comeback after graduating summa cum laude in Babson College for business studies, and is also the first blockbuster in Philippine cinema for the year 2000. This comes after his 1999 film, Isusumbong Kita sa Tatay Ko..., which was that year's highest grossing Philippine film.

This was also pop star Cris Villonco's film debut. Villonco later stated that she thought Fernando Poe, Jr. discovered her via the Pop Cola commercial.

== Plot ==
Jimmy de Guzman is a military doctor and is the lone survivor of a massacre during his wife's boss' farewell dinner. He spends years hunting down the criminals until he is able to kill the last of them and avenges his wife, her boss and his daughter. Returning to his normal life, he becomes a respected military neurosurgeon, and is engaged to the daughter of one of a hospital tycoon in Cebu. When his fiancée's niece suffers an aneurism, Jimmy is the lead surgeon, but the girl dies while recuperating, with Jimmy taking the blame. Shamed, he escapes to Manila where he spends his days drinking to drown his sorrow.

In his new home, Jimmy enjoys being incognito. After overcoming alcoholism, he becomes respected by the community, and his legend grows further when he conducts an appendectomy on son of a police officer during a flood. It was then revealed that a co-doctor, jealous of his success, deliberately overdosed his former fiancee's niece. This comes about after the doctor confessed to his wife and every one in the party that he poisoned the girl, causing his wife to disown him and have him arrested for it.

Jimmy later discovers that he has not fully avenged his family as the leader of the criminals that killed his wife is still on the loose with a new band of men. After a firefight aboard a docked ship, Jimmy finally kills the leader ending his journey.

He is coaxed to go back to Cebu but he choose to remain with new friends and newfound love.

== Cast ==
=== Main cast ===
- Fernando Poe, Jr. as Maj. Jaime "Jimmy" de Guzman, M.D.
- Nanette Medved as Connie
- Maritoni Fernandez as Menchu

=== Supporting cast ===
- Cris Villonco as Sheila
- Paquito Diaz as Sarge
- Ricardo Cepeda as Dr. Willy Romero
- Berting Labra as Pekto
- Bob Soler as Ship's Captain
- Romy Diaz as Adyong Tulak
- Zandro Zamora as Elmer
- Johnny Vicar as Leonardo Salazar
- Marco Polo Garcia as Julius
- Dindo Arroyo as Paeng
- Manjo del Mundo as Manjo
- Nonoy de Guzman as Noy
- Gerald Ejercito as Gerry
- R.G. Gutierrez as R.G.
- Bong Francisco as Bong
- Tony Carreon as Menchu's father
- Marita Zobel as Menchu's mother
- Maita Sanchez as Delia de Guzman
- Cecille Buensuseco as Catherine de Guzman
- Bon Vibar as Judge Dimayuga
- Dedes Whitaker as Lorena
- Dante Castro as Dr. Policarpio
- Jesette Rospero as Mrs. Dimayuga
- Naty Santiago as Sheila's Yaya
- Nanding Fernandez as Retired doctor
- Mark Angelo Wilson as Lito
- Bert Olivar
- Vic Varrion
- Eddie Tuazon
