= Tell the World of His Love =

Single by Carelle Mangaliag and Jeff Arcilla

from the album Tell the World of His Love: World Youth Day
- Released: 1994
- Recorded: 1994
- Genre: Contemporary Christian
- Length: 5:18
- Label: 3:16 Records (Praise, Inc.)
- Songwriter: Trina Belamide
- Producer: Trina Belamide

"Tell the World of His Love" is a 1995 contemporary Christian song composed by Trina Belamide and was used as the theme of the World Youth Day 1995 which took place in Manila, Philippines. The event also coincided with the second visit of Pope John Paul II in the country.

== Background ==
During the Philippine's preparation for the World Youth Day in 1995, an event coinciding Pope John Paul II's second visit to the country, a songwriting contest was held in late 1994 for the event's theme music. The prize was a trip for two to Rome (or the cash equivalent). Out of the 85 submitted entries, Trina Belamide's composition was among five finalists submitted to the Vatican, and her entry was selected as the winner. The song was performed by Carelle Mangaliag and Jeff Arcilla and was later interpreted by Jamie Rivera. The song's inspiration was taken from the World Youth Day's theme "As the Father has sent me so I send you" (John 20:21).

It also became the concluding song for the Papal Mass of Pope John Paul II on the final day of the event.

In an interview with the Manila Bulletin and Rappler, Belamide admitted that she originally joined the songwriting contest in order to win the prize. She gave the prize to her parents, as they had not yet traveled to Europe.

== Use after World Youth Day 1995 ==
The song was performed multiple times during the state and apostolic visit of Pope Francis in the Philippines in January 2015. It was performed by Lyca Gairanod during the meeting with Filipino families at the Mall of Asia Arena on January 16 and Darren Espanto during the meeting with the Filipino youth at the University of Santo Tomas on January 18. It was also used as the concluding song of the concluding Mass at the Quirino Grandstand on January 18. Belamide, the composer of the song and also a member of the Ateneo Chamber Singers, became part of the choir that sang for the Mass, which was composed of choral groups from various dioceses in the Philippines.

== Production ==
- Words and music by Trina Belamide
- Lead vocals by Jeffrey Arcilla and Raquel Mangaliag
- Back-up vocals by Dada de Pano, Niner de Pano, Trina Belamide, Andrei Jose, Wilson Santos, Ritchie Ilustre, Jocelle Prejido, and Carlo Prejido
- Musical arrangement by N. Arnel de Pano
- Vocal arrangement by Trina Belamide
- Produced by Trina Belamide
