= World Youth Day 1995 =

International Catholic youth event

- Official logo depicting a native boat and fishermen, evoking Matthew 4:19
- Date: January 10–15, 1995
- Location: Manila, Philippines; 14°35′N 121°0′E
- Type: Religious, youth festival
- Theme: As the Father has sent me, so am I sending you (Jn 20:21)
- Organised by: Catholic Church
- Participants: Pope John Paul II
- Previous: 1993 Denver
- Next: 1997 Paris
- Website: Vatican

World Youth Day 1995 (Filipino: Pandaigdigang Araw ng Kabataan 1995) was a Catholic youth festival that took place from January 10 to 15, 1995, in Manila, Philippines. It was the first time that an Asian country hosted the event. Pope John Paul II presided over the event, marking his second trip to the country as Pope after his visit in 1981, and also the last papal visit in the country of the 20th century and 2nd millennium.

== The program of the days ==
Since the opening ceremony, the Pope underlines the importance of the Filipino Catholic Church. At the meeting of the Federation of Asian Bishops' Conferences (FABC), the Pope points out what are the new areas of the contemporary mission: the poor of cities, migrants, refugees, young people, the media and social communications. "In the first millennium," he says, "the Cross has been planted on the soil of Europe; in the second on that of America and Africa; we can pray that in the third Christian millennium in this vast and vital continent there will be a great harvest of faith to be harvested".

== Events ==
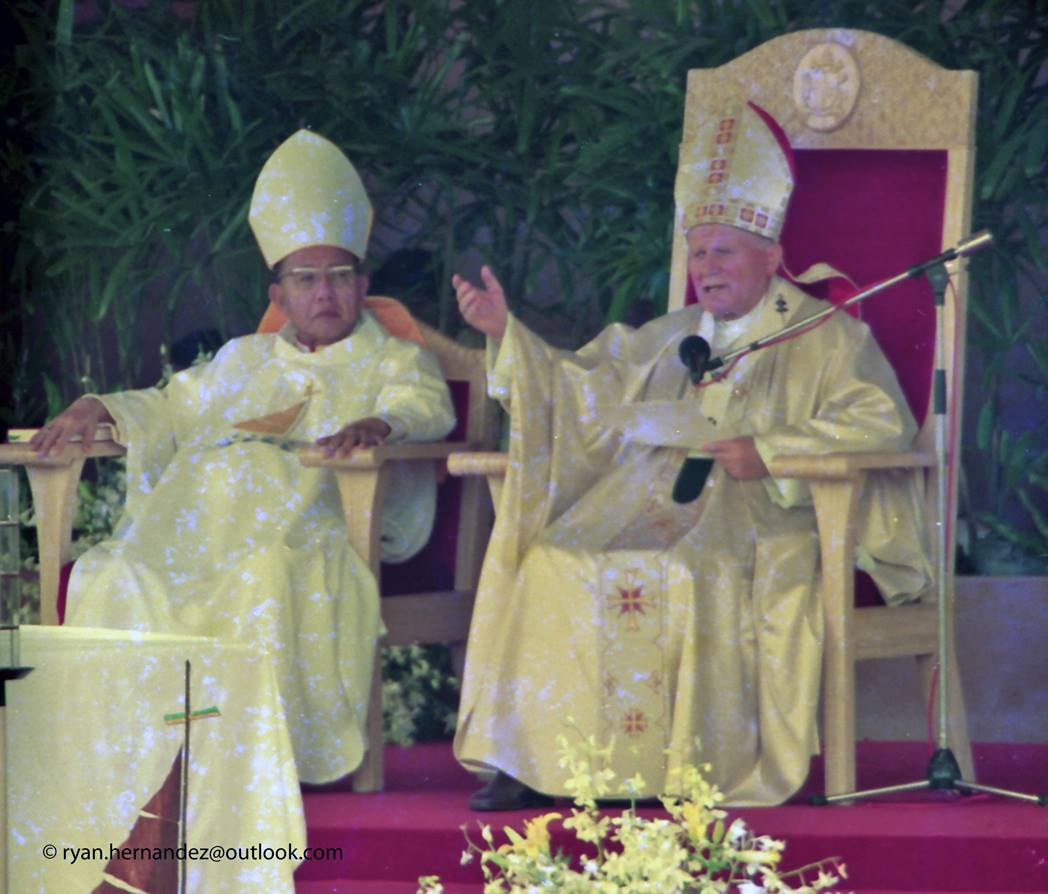
Pope John Paul II (right) with Manila Archbishop Cardinal Jaime Sin (left) addressing the crowd attending the closing mass of the 10th World Youth Day at Luneta Park

A week before the celebration of the World Youth Day proper, two representatives from each of countries all over the world gathered for an International Youth Forum (IYF) at the University of Santo Tomas. The Philippines sent eight representatives, while others were from the different Catholic religious youth organizations and campuses. These were the selected youth leaders and coordinators. During their five-day stay in UST, representatives were grouped and discussed issues and concerns laid out by the Episcopal Commission on Youth, on topics set months before.

The IYF was also a venue wherein few from these selected youth representative had able to have a short talk with the Pope. Young pilgrims gathered from many different parts of the world to celebrate God together, to learn other cultures and to speak as "brothers and sisters" among themselves. There was also a Mass where some youths directly received Communion from the Pope. Youth pilgrims gathered from different parts of the world to worship and talk together. Different activities were held, including a traditional Barrio Fiesta, where it was possible to search company and entertainment. During these days, Masses were celebrated every day in most parishes throughout the Philippines.

The closing Mass, held at Luneta Park, was estimated to have been attended by more than 5 million people, the second-largest papal gathering in history.

The event saw the presence of Catholic representatives of all Chinese communities: China, Taiwan, Hong Kong, Macau, Malaysia, and Singapore. Already on January 12, the archbishop of Taipei, Joseph Ti-kang, celebrated mass with 5 priests of the "official" Chinese Roman Catholic Church. On January 14, through Radio Veritas, the pope launches a message of reconciliation between the "official" and underground Chinese Church addressed to "all the Catholic faithful". At the end of the Mass in Luneta Park, the Pope greeted in Chinese, the language of China and Taiwan.

This was Pope John Paul II's last visit to the Philippines, as his scheduled return for the World Meeting of Families eight years later in January 2003 was cancelled due to the progression of his Parkinson's disease.

== Official song ==
The official song for World Youth Day 1995 was released in 1994, titled "Tell the World of His Love", composed by Trina Belamide and interpreted by Jeffrey Arcilla and Raquel Mangaliag. It was later sung by Jaime Rivera under Star Music. Meanwhile, the "Gloria in excelsis Deo" that was used in the concluding mass was composed by Jean-Paul Lecot and Dom Benildus Ma. Maramba, OSB, and is used on churches around the Philippines after its original usage in the event.

== Theme ==
"As the Father has sent me, so am I sending you" (Jn 20:21).
