= Morissette (album) =

Studio album by Morissette
- Released: March 20, 2015
- Recorded: July 2014–February 2015
- Genre: Pop
- Length: 1:12:39
- Language: English, Filipino
- Label: Star Music
- Producer: Francis "Kiko" Salazar

Morissette chronology
Morissette (2015)	Morissette at 14, Vol. 1 (2020)

Singles from Morissette
- 1. "'Di Mapaliwanag" Released: February 25, 2015; 2. "Throwback" Released: November 21, 2015; 3. "Hinahanap Pa Rin" Released: February 23, 2017

Morissette is the debut studio album by Filipino singer Morissette and was released in the Philippines on March 20, 2015, by Star Music.

== Promotion ==
Promotion for the album was launched on April 12, 2015, with a performance at Shangri-La Plaza.

== Commercial performance ==
In 2015, the album reached No. 6 in Astrovision and Astroplus's Overall & International Album Chart. It also peaked at No. 1 on Odyssey Music & Video's Philippines sales reports in the OPM and Overall categories. In 2015 and 2017, the album reached No. 3 on Japan's OPM Top Selling Albums Annual Chart. It also appeared on the same chart in 2018, peaking at number one in the months of August, September, October, and December before coming in first place on the annual album chart.

On June 11, 2017, Morissette was certified Gold and Platinum by the Philippine Association of the Record Industry (PARI), denoting the sale of 15,000 album-equivalent units; the announcement was made during Morissette's 21st birthday performance on the variety show ASAP.

== Singles ==
"'Di Mapaliwanag" was the album's lead single and was released on all music platforms in February 2015. A lyric video was uploaded to YouTube on February 27 of the same year. It became the official theme song of My Lovely Girl, a South Korean drama series that aired on ABS-CBN. The official music video, directed by Frank Lloyd Mamaril, was uploaded on Star Music’s official YouTube channel on June 14, 2015. Morissette performed "'Di Mapaliwanag" for the first time with Jed Madela on ASAP. "Throwback" with KZ Tandingan was the album's second single. The official music and lyric video was released on Star Music’s official YouTube channel on June and November 2015.

== Track listing ==
No.	Title	Writer(s)	Length
1.	"Throwback" (featuring KZ Tandingan)	Francis "Kiko" Salazar	4:16
2.	"'Di Mapaliwanag"	Arnie Mendaros; Salazar	3:14
3.	"Hinahanap Pa Rin"	Myrus Apacible	4:02
4.	"Mahal Kita, Mahal Mo Siya, Mahal Niya Ay Iba"	Ernie De La Pena; Charo Unite	4:34
5.	"You and I"	Salazar	3:59
6.	"Akin Ka Na Lang" (Acoustic Version)	Salazar	4:20
7.	"Ano'ng Nangyari Sa Ating Dalawa" (Instrumental)	Joven Tan	4:47
8.	"Ano'ng Nangyari Sa Ating Dalawa" (Two Wives Filipino Remake Theme Song)	Tan	4:49
9.	"Akin Ka Na Lang" (Original Version)	Salazar	4:18
10.	"Kapag Ako Ay Nagmahal" (Flordeliza Theme Song)	Larry Hermoso	5:13
11.	"Nothing's Gonna Stop Us Now" (with Daniel Padilla)	Albert Hammond; Diane Warren	4:18
12.	"'Di Mapaliwanag" (Instrumental)	Mendaros; Salazar	3:13
13.	"Akin Ka Na Lang" (Instrumental)	Salazar	4:18
14.	"Hinahanap Pa Rin" (Instrumental)	Apacible	4:02
15.	"You and I" (Instrumental)	Salazar	3:59
16.	"Kapag Ako Ay Nagmahal" (Instrumental)	Hermoso	5:13
Total length:			68:35

== Release history ==
Region	Date	Format	Label
Philippines	March 20, 2015	Digital download	Star Music
Philippines	April 12, 2015	CD	Star Music

== Charts ==
=== Weekly charts ===
Weekly chart performance for Morissette
Chart (2015)	Peak position
Filipino Albums (Astrovision/Astroplus)	6
Filipino Albums (Odyssey Music & Video)	1

=== Year-end charts ===
Year-end chart performance for Morissette
Chart (2015)	Position
Japanese Albums (Mia Music & Books)	3

Chart (2017)	Position
Japanese Albums (Mia Music & Books)	3

Chart (2018)	Position
Japanese Albums (Mia Music & Books)	1

== Certification ==
Region	Certification	Certified units/sales
Philippines (PARI)	Platinum	15,000^{*}
^{*} Sales figures based on certification alone.
