= Harana (band) =

Filipino boy band

- Origin: Philippines
- Genres: P-pop, OPM
- Years active: 2015–2018
- Label: Star Music (2015–2018)
- Past members: Joseph Marco; Marlo Mortel; Michael Pangilinan; Bryan Santos

Harana was an all-male vocal group from the Philippines. It was under ABS-CBN and Star Music. The group consisted of Joseph "Joey" Marco, Marlo Mortel, Michael "Khel" Pangilinan, and Bryan Santos.

== History ==
=== Pre-debut ===
Star Music's head, Roxy Liquigan shared that initially it was Joseph Marco and Bryan Santos who inspired the formation of the boyband.

“Last year kasi, may nakita akong video sa party ni Arjo Atayde. May video na sumasayaw si Bryan at si Joseph Marco na parang nagbo-boy band. So nagkaroon ako ng idea when we talked kami sa buong Star Music. Meron tayo Gimme 5, ‘yung mga teeners. Ang wala sa industry natin ‘yung boy band na mga gwapo at nakakakanta at parang suave lang, Mr. Suave lang dating sa atin.” — he related.

“Last year, I saw one of this video in Arjo Atayde's party. In that video, Bryan is dancing and Joseph is having like a boy-band thing. So here comes this idea when we talked about things together with everyone in Star Music. We have Gimme 5, the teens. The thing we don't have in our industry is a boy band who are handsome and singers who have that Mr. Suave look in them.” — he related.

Michael came into the picture when Star Music was looking for an artist to sing Joven Tan's “Pare Mahal Mo Raw Ako,” an entry at the 2014 Himig Handog P-Pop Love Songs. Marlo then completed the group when he finished shooting for hit daytime show, Be Careful with My Heart.

=== 2015–2018 ===
ASAP launched their newest boy group called “Harana” with members Marco, Santos, Pangilinan, and Mortel with their carrier single, “Number One”. On ASAP Chillout, the boys serenaded their fans with their version of the 60's hit, "Baby I Need Your Loving".

After Harana served as opening act in KZ Tandingan’s concert at the Music Museum on 17 April 2015, more gig offers poured in for the group. They performed their debut single “Number One” at the OPM Fresh press conference on April 28.

They performed recently at the “Most Wanted” concert of Daniel Padilla at the SM Mall Of Asia Arena last June 13, 2015. On October 16, they had their first concert at the Music Museum.

Harana disbanded in 2018. Marco has since focused on his acting career. Mortel became a host on several television shows. Pangilinan has continued his career in the music industry, with his song "Alipin" charting on Billboard Philippines' Hot 100.

== Members ==
The group is composed of:

- Joseph "Joey" Marco
- Marlo Mortel
- Michael "Khel" Pangilinan
- Bryan Santos

== Discography ==
=== Music videos ===
Year	Title	Artist	Details	Ref.
2015	"Number One"	Harana	Words & Melody By: Kennard Faraon; Arranged & Produced By: Kiko Salazar; Supervising Producer: Rox Santos; Published By: Star Songs, Inc.	
2016	"Baby I Love Your Way"	Harana with Morissette	Words and Music By: Peter Frampton; Arranged & Mixed By: KidWolf; Music Production By: Kiko Salazar & Jonathan Manalo; Official theme song of The Third Party	
2016	"Tragedy"	Harana with 4th Impact	Words & Music By; Barry, Maurice and Robin Gibb; Arranged by: Tony Katigbak; Mixed & Master by: Dante Tanedo; Music Production by: Jonathan Manalo	
2017	"Alapaap"	Harana with Yeng Constantino	Words & Music By: Ely Buendia; Arranged By: Tommy Katigbak; Mixed & Mastered By: Dante Tañedo; Music Production By: Jonathan Manalo; Official theme song of Dear Other Self	

=== Singles ===
Year	Track	Details	Notes	Ref.
2015	"Baby I Need Your Lovin’"	Music & Lyrics By: Brian Holland, Edward Jr. Holland & Lamont Dozier; Original Artist and Year: Four Tops, 1964; Produced By: Francis 'KIKO' Salazar	Official theme song of You're My Boss	
2015	"Smile In Your Heart’"	Words & Music By: Rene Novelles; Arranged By: Teddy Katigbak; Mixed By: Dante Tanedo; Produced By: Kiko Salazar, Raizo Chabeldin & Star Music Productions	Official theme song of Just The Way You Are	
2017	"Can't Get Over You"	Words & Music By: Kennard Faron; Published By: Star Music	—N/a	

=== Compilation albums ===
Date	Tracks	Album	Artist	Details	Certification	Ref.
2015	"Number One"	OPM Fresh	VARIOUS ARTIST: Date Released: 2 February 2015; Label: Star Music	TBA		

=== Studio albums ===
Year	Album title	Track Listing	Details	Certification	Ref.
2014	Harana (Debut Album)	Tracks: 1. Number One; 2. LDR; 3. Dito Ka Lang Sa Puso Ko; 4. Kapag Ikaw Ay Kapiling; 5. Kung Akin Ang Mundo; 6. Baby I Need You Loving	Released Date: 2015; Recording Label: Star Music	TBA	

== Accolades ==
Year	Award-giving Body	Category	Nominee/Nominated Work	Result	Ref.
2015	7th PMPC Star Awards for Music	Duo/Group Artist of the Year	Harana	Nominated	
2016	47th GMMSF Box-Office Entertainment Awards	Most Promising Recording/Performing Group	Harana	Won	
2016	29th Awit Awards	Best Performance by a Group Recording Artists	Harana	Won	
2016	29th Awit Awards	Best Performance by a New Group Recording Artists	Harana	Nominated	
2017	12th Myx Music Awards	Favorite Remake	"Baby I Love Your Way" (with Morissette)	Nominated	
