= 'Di Mapaliwanag =

Single by Morissette

from the album Morissette
- Language: Tagalog
- Released: February 25, 2015
- Genre: Pop; OPM
- Length: 3:14
- Label: Star Music
- Songwriters: Arnie Mendaros; Francis Kiko Salazar

Music video
- "'Di Mapaliwanag" on YouTube

"'Di Mapaliwanag" (transl. "Can't Be Explained") is a song first recorded by Filipino singer Morissette. It was written by Arnie Mendaros and Francis Kiko Salazar and served as the lead single for Morissette's debut album Morissette, which was released on February 25, 2015. The song was later chosen as the main theme for the Korean drama My Lovely Girl, which was broadcast on ABS-CBN. The song won the Female Artist of the Year at the MOR Pinoy Music Awards and garnered nominations, including the Favorite Song at the Star Cinema Awards, as well as the Best Wishclusive Performance by a Female Artist and Wish Original Song of the Year at the Wish 107.5 Music Awards.

== Music video ==
The official lyric video of the song was published on Star Music's official YouTube channel on February 27, 2015. The music video of the song, directed by Frank Lloyd Mamaril, was released on YouTube on June 14, 2015.

== Accolades ==
Awards and nominations for "'Di Mapaliwanag"
Year (Note: Indicates the year of the ceremony. Each year is linked to the article about the awards held that year, wherever possible.)	Award	Category	Result	Ref.
2015	Star Cinema Awards	Favorite Song	Nominated	
2015	Wish 107.5 Music Awards	Best Wishclusive Performance by a Female Artist	Nominated	
2015	Wish 107.5 Music Awards	Wish Original Song of the Year	Nominated	
2016	MOR Pinoy Music Awards	Female Artist of the Year	Won	

== Charts ==
Chart performance for "'Di Mapaliwanag"
Chart (2015)	Peak position
Philippines (Myx Hit Chart)	17
Philippines (Myx Pinoy Chart)	12
