= Shine (Ima Castro song) =

Single by Ima Castro
- Released: 1996
- Genre: OPM
- Songwriter(s): Trina Belamide

"Shine" is a song written by Filipino songwriter Trina Belamide for the 1996 Metro Manila Popular Music Festival (Metropop), where it won second place. It was originally performed by Ima Castro, and was performed by Sweet Plantado in the Metropop live performances .

== Cover versions ==
In 2004, the song again became a hit in the Philippines as sung by Regine Velasquez.

In celebration of the song's 25th anniversary in 2021, Morissette was chosen to record a new version with arrangements by Filipino-American music producer Troy Laureta.
