= Naririnig Mo Ba =

Single by Morissette

from the album Himig Handog 2017
- Language: Tagalog
- Released: October 6, 2017
- Genre: Pop; OPM
- Length: 3:50
- Label: Star Music
- Songwriters: Joan Da; LJ Manzano
- Producers: LJ Manzano; JM

Music video
- . "Naririnig Mo Ba" on YouTube

"Naririnig Mo Ba" (transl. "Do You Hear") is a song first recorded by Filipino pop ballad song by singer Morissette, released in 2017 as part of the Himig Handog songwriting competition. The song was written and composed by LJ Manzano and Joan Da, with arrangements by Huly Ray Asidor and LJ Manzano. The song's official music video was produced by the Southern Luzon State University in Lucban, Quezon, and Big Minds Productions.

The song has been well received by listeners, with the official music video garnering over 11 million views on YouTube. Although the song did not win any awards in the songwriting competition, it won the Awit Award for Best Ballad Recording and earned a nomination for the Myx Music Award for Mellow Video of the Year in 2018.

== Music video ==
The official music video of the song was produced by Southern Luzon State University in Lucban, Quezon. It was released on Star Music's YouTube channel on November 4, 2017. The song garnered over 11 million views as of February 2024. Directed by Miguel Potestades, the video features picturesque scenes and heartfelt moments that complement the song's emotional theme.

== Personnel ==
Credits adapted from YouTube:

- Morissette – vocals
- Joan Da – songwriter
- LJ Manzano – songwriter, arrangement, guitars, keyboards & effects, producer
- Huly Ray Asidor – arrangement, keyboards & effects
- Francis Kiko Salazar – additional strings
- Ian Gil Fajarito – keyboards & effects
- Chrysler Badiang – bass guitar
- JM – vocal arrangement, producer, recorder
- Boggie Manipon – mixing, mastering

== Live performances ==
Morissette first performed the song on ASAP Natin 'To on October 15, 2017. She also performed it live on Wish 107.5 Bus where it gained over 12 million views as of February 2024.

== Cover versions ==
In 2020, Pia Banga, a contender from season 2 of The Voice Teens, performed the song in the Knockouts round. In 2023, a participant in season 5 of The Voice Kids, Candice Flores, used the song for her audition. The same year, Sheryn Regis sang the song in a segment of ASAP Natin 'To, called "The Greatest Showdown".

== Accolades ==
Awards and nominations for "Naririnig Mo Ba"
Year (Note: Indicates the year of the ceremony. Each year is linked to the article about the awards held that year, wherever possible.)	Award	Category	Result	Ref.
2017	Himig Handog	Best Song	Nominated	
2018	Awit Awards	Best Ballad Recording	Won	
2018	Myx Music Awards	Mellow Video of the Year	Nominated	

== Charts ==
Chart performance for "Naririnig Mo Ba"
Chart (2017)	Peak position
Philippines (Myx Hit Chart)	20
Philippines (Myx Pinoy Chart)	6

Chart (2018)	Peak position
Philippines (Myx Pinoy Chart)	13
