= Akin Ka Na Lang =

- Official music video thumbnail

Single by Morissette

from the album Himig Handog P-Pop Love Song (2014) and Morissette
- Released: August 15, 2014
- Genre: OPM
- Length: 4:18
- Label: Star Music
- Songwriter: Francis Kiko Salazar
- Producer: Francis Kiko Salazar

Morissette singles chronology
"Begin" (2013)	"Akin Ka Na Lang" (2014)	"Run Like A Warrior" (2015)

Audio sample
- "Akin Ka Na Lang": file; help

Music video
- "Akin Ka Na Lang" on YouTube

"Akin Ka Na Lang" (lit. 'Just Be Mine') is a Filipino song first recorded by singer and songwriter Morissette. It was written by Francis Kiko Salazar for the Himig Handog: P-Pop Love Songs songwriting competition (2014). The song reached the finals of the competition but did not receive an award. Nevertheless, it became a popular ballad in the Philippines. It was released as a bonus track on Morissette's 2015 eponymous debut album.

== Personnel ==
Credits adapted from YouTube:

- Morissette – vocals
- Francis Kiko Salazar – songwriter, producer, back-up vocals
- Dante Tañedo – mixing, mastering

== Live performances ==
In 2014, Morissette sang "Akin Ka Na Lang" on the variety show ASAP. In 2018, she sang the song again on ASAP together with Ogie Alcasid and fans from Malaysia, South Korea and the United Kingdom. In 2019, Birit Queens (Angeline Quinto, Morissette, Klarisse De Guzman and Jona) reunited to celebrate Morissette's birthday, singing the song.

In 2017, Morissette performed "Akin Ka Na Lang" at MYX Philippines in an acoustic version. In 2018, she sang the song on Wish 107.5, which helped the song to gain popularity. As of November 2024, this live performance on the Wish Bus had accumulated over 181 million views on YouTube. In 2018, at Morissette's concert at Araneta Coliseum, Regine Velasquez made a guest appearance, singing "Akin Ka Na Lang" with her.

== Music video ==
The official music video of "Akin Ka Na Lang" was released on August 31, 2014, directed by Colegio de San Juan de Letran. As of July 2022, it had garnered more than 33 million views on YouTube.

== Other versions ==
In 2015, an acoustic version of the song was released. In the same year, "Akin Ka Na Lang" became part of the official soundtrack of two TV series: Pasión de Amor and FPJ's Ang Probinsyano. In 2020, Morissette released a Latin version of the song.

== Cover versions ==
Cover versions of the song have been performed by Katrina Velarde and Jex de Castro. In 2022, Gigi De Lana's rendition of the song became part of the official soundtrack of the ABS-CBN television series A Family Affair.

== Accolades ==
Awards and nominations for "Akin Ka Na Lang"
Year (Note: Indicates the year of the ceremony. Each year is linked to the article about the awards held that year, wherever possible.)	Award	Category	Result	Ref.
2014	Himig Handog	Best Song	Nominated	
2014	Aliw Awards	Best New Artist	Nominated	
2015	Awit Awards	Best Performance by a New Female Recording Artist	Nominated	
2015	MOR Pinoy Music Awards	Best New Artist	Won	
2015	PMPC Star Awards for Music	Song of the Year	Nominated	
2019	Wish 107.5 Music Awards	Wishclusive Ballad Performance of the Year	Won	
2019	Wish 107.5 Music Awards	Wishclusive Elite Circle — Bronze	Won	
2019	Wish 107.5 Music Awards	Wishclusive Elite Circle — Silver	Won	
2019	Wish 107.5 Music Awards	Wishclusive Elite Circle — Gold	Won	
2020	Wish 107.5 Music Awards	Wishclusive Elite Circle — Platinum	Won	
2020	Wish 107.5 Music Awards	Wishclusive Elite Circle — Diamond	Won	

== Charts ==
Chart performance for "Akin Ka Na Lang"
Chart (2017)	Peak position
Philippines (Philippine Top 20)	11
Philippines (Philippine Hot 100)	84
