= Michael Pangilinan =

Filipino singer, actor, and model (born 1995)

- Born: November 26, 1995 (age 30); Pulilan, Bulacan, Philippines
- Origin: Manila, Philippines
- Genres: Pinoy pop; OPM
- Occupations: Singer, actor, model
- Instrument: Vocals
- Years active: 2010–present
- Label: Star Music
- Member of: Harana

Michael Pangilinan (born November 26, 1995) is a Filipino singer-songwriter, actor, and model. He was the runner-up in the second season of Your Face Sounds Familiar and is a member of the band Harana.

== Early life ==
Michael Pangilinan was born on November 26, 1995, in Pulilan, Bulacan. He is the second of three children of Tony and Precy Pangilinan, who were car dealers with an interest in music.

== Biography ==
Pangilinan first appeared on the franchise talent-search of ABS-CBN The X Factor Philippines in 2012, and was part of the Top 20 being eliminated during the "Judges House" episode. He then had many appearances on the late night show Walang Tulugan on GMA. In 2014, he got his first break in showbiz when he interpreted a Himig Handog PPop Love Songs entry by Joven Tan entitled "Pare, Mahal Mo Raw Ako" that immediately trended because it somewhat tackles the LGBT community with its theme.

He was part of the impersonating competition called Your Face Sounds Familiar in its 2nd Filipino season where he finished first runner up to winner Denise Laurel.

He also sang some of the theme songs of ABS-CBN's teleseries and Star Cinema movies. He was part of the singing group Harana together with Marlo Mortel, Bryan Santos and Joseph Marco. He has recorded albums under Star Music, namely self titled album Michael Panglinan and then Michael. Since 2018, he has been part of the all-male vocal trio BuDaKhel along with Bugoy Drilon and Daryl Ong.

Besides singing, Pangilinan can play the guitar without taking up formal lessons because his parents are into music. His R&B vocal style was influenced by musicians including Luke Mejares and Duncan Ramos. Among his musical influences were Janno Gibbs, Jay R and Brian McKnight.

== Personal life ==
In 2015, it was announced his ex-girlfriend Erin Ocampo was pregnant with his child and he pledged his support, saying they were still friends.

In 2016, it was confirmed he is in a relationship with actress and singer Garie Concepcion, the daughter of actor Gabby Concepcion and Grace Ibuna.

== Discography ==
=== Singles ===
List of singles as lead artist, showing year released, selected chart positions, and associated albums
Title	Year	Peak chart positions		Album
Title	Year	PHL	TPS	Album
2014	"Pare, Mahal Ko Raw Ako"	–	–	Himig Handog P-Pop Love Songs 2014
2015	"It Might Be You"	–	–	Everyday I Love You (OST)
2015	"Pusong Ligaw"	–	–	Bridges of Love (OST)
2016	"Hanggang Kailan"	–	–	Michael
2016	"Your Love"	–	–	Dolce Amore (OST)
2017	"Kung Sakali"	–	–	Non-album single
2025	"Alipin" (Note: It was later removed on Spotify)	16	7	Non-album single

=== Albums ===
with Harana

- 2014: Harana

Solo Albums

- 2014: Michael Pangilinan (EP)
- 2016: Michael

== Filmography ==
=== Television ===
Year	Title	Role	Notes	Source
2010–2016	Walang Tulugan with the Master Showman	Himself	Performer	
2010–2013	Party Pilipinas	Himself	Performer	
2011	Maynila: Young Love in Trouble	Rommel	Episode role	
2012	Maynila: My Heart's Keeper	Daniel	Episode role	
2012	The X Factor Philippines	Himself	Auditionee	
2014–2015	Luv U	Himself	Cameo role	
2015–2020	ASAP	Himself	Performer	
2015	Your Face Sounds Familiar 2	Himself	Contestant	
2020	Eat Bulaga!	Himself	Guest	
2020; 2021	Wowowin	Himself	Guest Performer	
2020	All-Out Sundays	Himself	Guest Performer	

=== Film ===
Year	Title	Role
2016	Pare, Mahal Mo Raw Ako	Red

== Awards and nominations ==
Name of the award ceremony, year presented, award category, nominee(s) of the award, and the result of the nomination
Award ceremony	Year	Category	Nominee(s)/work(s)	Result	Ref.
Aliw Awards	2014	Best New Artist	Pare, Mahal Mo Raw Ako	Won	
Aliw Awards	2015	Best Actor (Musical)	Kanser @35 the Musical	Nominated	
Aliw Awards	2016	Best Male Performance in a Concert	"Michael Sounds Familliar"	Won	
Awit Awards	2015	Best Performance by a New Male Recording Artist	Pare, Mahal Mo Raw Ako	Nominated	
Awit Awards	2017	Best Ballad Recording	Hanggang Kailan	Nominated	
Awit Awards	2018	Best Collaboration	Kung Ako Na Lang Sana (with Kaye Cal & Maya)	Nominated	
Awit Awards	2018	People's Voice for Favorite Collaboration	Kung Ako Na Lang Sana (with Kaye Cal & Maya)	Nominated	
MOR Pinoy Music Awards	2017	Male Artist of the Year	Michael (Album)	Won	
PMPC Star Awards for Movies	2017	New Movie Actor of the Year	Pare, Mahal Mo Raw Ako	Nominated	
PMPC Star Awards for TV	2012	Best New Male TV Personality	Walang Tulugan with Master Showman	Nominated	
Wish 107.5 Music Awards	2017	Male Artist of the Year	Himself	Nominated	
Wish 107.5 Music Awards	2017	Song of the Year	Hanggang Kailan	Nominated	
Wish 107.5 Music Awards	2018	Wishclusive R&B Performance of the Year	Tayo Na Lang	Won	
