= Masked Singer Pilipinas season 2 =

Masked Singer Pilipinas
- Season 2
- Starring: Bayani Agbayani; Matteo Guidicelli; Kim Molina; Aga Muhlach; Cristine Reyes
- Hosted by: Billy Crawford
- No. of contestants: 16
- Winner: Kris Lawrence as "Panda"
- Runner-up: Frenchie Dy as "Crispy Patty"
- No. of episodes: 13 (+1 special)

Release
- Original network: TV5
- Original release: March 19 – June 18, 2022

Season chronology
- ← Previous; Season 1 Next → Season 3

The second season of the Philippine television series Masked Singer Pilipinas premiered on TV5 on March 19 to June 18, 2022, replacing Sing Galing: Sing-lebrity Edition.

== Production ==
A second season was announced during the finale of the first season. A new logo for the season was published on the official Facebook page of the show. Filming for the second season started on October 29, 2021 and concluded on December 10, 2021. Similar to the previous season, a virtual audience is present via Zoom.

=== Broadcast ===
Due to the PiliPinas Debates 2022, the pilot episode of the season was aired 30 minutes earlier. The show did not air on April 16, 2022, in observance of Holy Week, as Black Saturday pre-empts regular programming.

== Panelists and host ==
Season 2 panelists and host

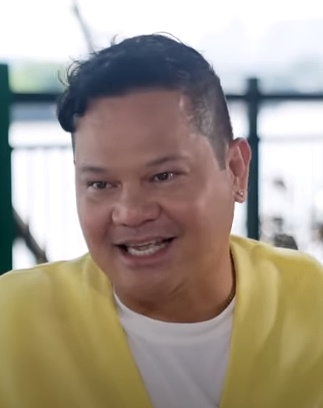
Bayani Agbayani

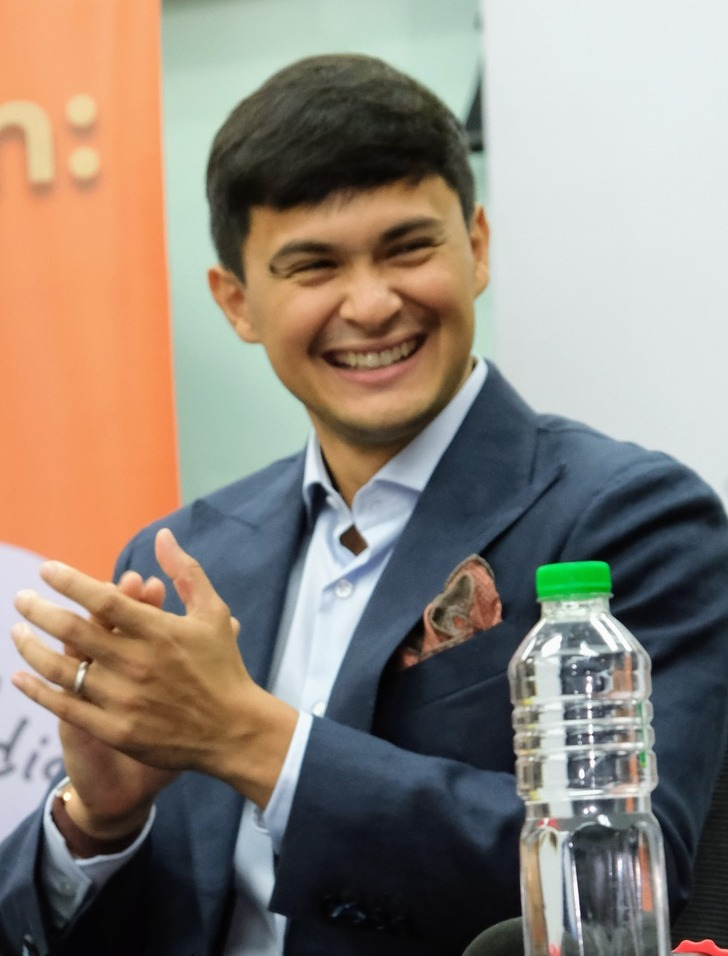
Matteo Guidicelli

Kim Molina

Aga Muhlach

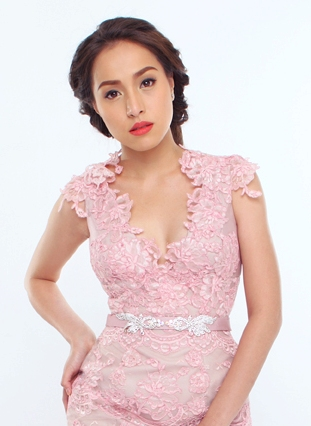
Cristine Reyes

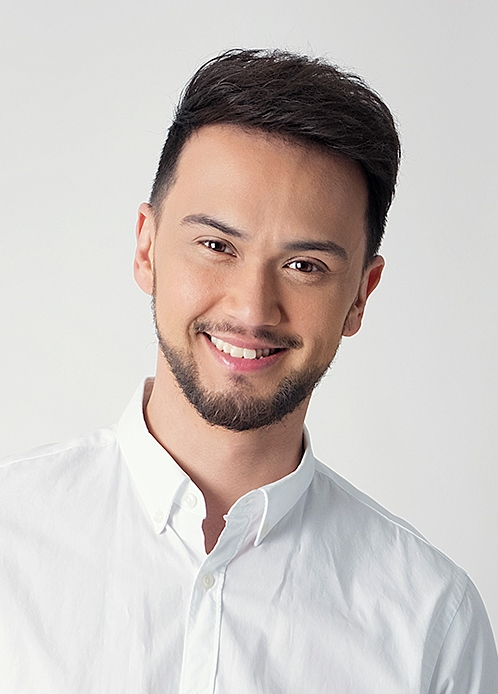
Billy Crawford

In September 2021, it was reported that all four panelists from the previous season would return, to be joined by a fifth permanent panelist. Bayani Agbayani was revealed as the fifth permanent panelist on March 10, 2022.

The panelists started a competition among themselves to get the most correct guesses on the identity of the masked singers. They were grouped into two—Agbayani, Guidicelli, and Muhlach as Team Boys, and Molina and Reyes as Team Girls. This mechanic was formalized in the second episode as the Hula Maskedters. The first team to give the correct name of the masked singer within the entire season earns a point. The team with the most points at the end of the semifinals wins the Hula Maskedters trophy.

At the end of the semifinals, Team Boys won against Team Girls with a final score of 6–5.

== Contestants ==
This season features 16 masked celebrities. The masks were revealed during the virtual media conference of the show on March 14, 2022.

Stage name	Celebrity	Occupation	Episodes												
Stage name	Celebrity	Occupation	1	2	3	4	5	6	7	8	9	10	11	12	13
Panda	Kris Lawrence	Singer	SAFE						SAFE			SAFE	SAFE	SAFE	WINNER
Crispy Patty	Frenchie Dy	Singer/actress			SAFE		SAFE					SAFE	SAFE	SAFE	RUNNER-UP
Jeepie	Arthur Nery	Singer		SAFE			SAFE				SAFE		SAFE	SAFE	THIRD
Candylabra	Marion Aunor	Singer/actress	SAFE					SAFE		SAFE			SAFE	SAFE	FOURTH
Banana	Jex de Castro	Singer				SAFE		SAFE			SAFE		SAFE	OUT	
Tarsier	Jean Kiley	Actress/host				SAFE	SAFE			SAFE			OUT		
Portobello	Nino Alejandro	Singer/songwriter			SAFE			SAFE				OUT			
Popcorn	Jinky Vidal	Singer/composer				SAFE			SAFE		OUT				
Singkwenta	Mark Carpio	Singer			SAFE				SAFE	OUT					
Pato Tim	Jeffrey Hidalgo	Singer		SAFE					OUT						
Sunflower	Cooky Chua	Singer		SAFE				OUT							
Labuyo	Jovit Baldivino	Singer/actor	SAFE				OUT								
Dolphin	Arnell Ignacio	Game show host/actor				OUT									
Peacock	Lyca Gairanod	Singer/actress			OUT										
Cara-Bow	Radha	Singer/songwriter		OUT											
Babe-Wit	Aubrey Caraan	Singer/actress	OUT												

The masked singer was safe from elimination.
The masked singer was eliminated from the competition and unmasked upon their elimination.
The masked singer did not perform.

== Episodes ==
=== Week 1 (March 19) ===
Performances on the first episode
#	Stage name	Song	Identity	Result
1	Labuyo	"Nosi Balasi" by Sampaguita	undisclosed	SAFE
2	Candylabra	"Bohemian Rhapsody" by Queen	undisclosed	SAFE
3	Babe-Wit	"In the Name of Love" by Martin Garrix and Bebe Rexha	Aubrey Caraan	OUT
4	Panda	"Miss Independent" by Ne-Yo	undisclosed	SAFE

=== Week 2 (March 26) ===
Performances on the second episode
#	Stage name	Song	Identity	Result
1	Pato Tim	"Versace on the Floor" by Bruno Mars	undisclosed	SAFE
2	Sunflower	"Buwan" by Juan Karlos	undisclosed	SAFE
3	Cara-Bow	"34+35" by Ariana Grande	Radha	OUT
4	Jeepie	"Rainbow" by South Border	undisclosed	SAFE

=== Week 3 (April 2) ===
Performances on the third episode
#	Stage name	Song	Identity	Result
1	Crispy Patty	"You Oughta Know" by Alanis Morissette	undisclosed	SAFE
2	Singkwenta	"When I Met You" by Apo Hiking Society	undisclosed	SAFE
3	Peacock	"Don't Let Me Down" by The Chainsmokers	Lyca Gairanod	OUT
4	Portobello	"Dynamite" by BTS	undisclosed	SAFE

=== Week 4 (April 9) ===
Performances on the fourth episode
#	Stage name	Song	Identity	Result
1	Popcorn	"Blank Space" by Taylor Swift	undisclosed	SAFE
2	Dolphin	"All of Me" by John Legend	Arnell Ignacio	OUT
3	Tarsier	"Royals" by Lorde	undisclosed	SAFE
4	Banana	"The Fox (What Does the Fox Say?)" by Ylvis	undisclosed	SAFE

=== Week 5 (April 23) ===
Performances on the fifth episode
#	Stage name	Song	Identity	Result
1	Crispy Patty	"Sirena" by Gloc 9	undisclosed	SAFE
2	Jeepie	"Yakap sa Dilim" by Apo Hiking Society	undisclosed	SAFE
3	Labuyo	"Tao" by Sampaguita	Jovit Baldivino	OUT
4	Tarsier	"Wrecking Ball" by Miley Cyrus	undisclosed	SAFE

=== Week 6 (April 30) ===
Performances on the sixth episode
#	Stage name	Song	Identity	Result
1	Sunflower	"Girl on Fire" by Alicia Keys	Cooky Chua	OUT
2	Banana	"Lost Stars" by Adam Levine	undisclosed	SAFE
3	Portobello	"Faithfully" by Journey	undisclosed	SAFE
4	Candylabra	"Zombie" by The Cranberries	undisclosed	SAFE

=== Week 7 (May 7) ===
Performances on the seventh episode
#	Stage name	Song	Identity	Result
1	Panda	"When I Was Your Man" by Bruno Mars	undisclosed	SAFE
2	Popcorn	“My Immortal” by Evanescence	undisclosed	SAFE
3	Pato Tim	"214" by Rivermaya	Jeffrey Hidalgo	OUT
4	Singkwenta	"Lay Me Down" by Sam Smith	undisclosed	SAFE

=== Week 8 (May 14) ===
Performances on the eighth episode
#	Stage name	Song	Identity	Result
1	Candylabra	"Fever" by Peggy Lee	undisclosed	SAFE
2	Singkwenta	"Sunday Morning" by Maroon 5	Mark Carpio	OUT
3	Tarsier	"Hindi Na Nga" by This Band	undisclosed	SAFE

=== Week 9 (May 21) ===
Performances on the ninth episode
#	Stage name	Song	Identity	Result
1	Jeepie	"Let Me Be the One" by Jimmy Bondoc	undisclosed	SAFE
2	Popcorn	"I'm with You" by Avril Lavigne	Jinky Vidal	OUT
3	Banana	"Kathang Isip" by Ben&Ben	undisclosed	SAFE

=== Week 10 (May 28) ===
Performances on the tenth episode
#	Stage name	Song	Identity	Result
1	Crispy Patty	“Separate Ways” by Journey	undisclosed	SAFE
2	Panda	“Run to You” by Whitney Houston	undisclosed	SAFE
3	Portobello	“The Search is Over” by Survivor	Nino Alejandro	OUT

=== Week 11 (June 4) ===
No clues were presented during this episode.

Performances on the eleventh episode
#	Stage name	Song	Identity	Result
1	Banana	“Beggin'” by Måneskin	undisclosed	SAFE
2	Jeepie	“Ipagpatawad Mo” by VST & Company	undisclosed	SAFE
3	Tarsier	"You Give Love a Bad Name” by Bon Jovi	Jean Kiley	OUT
4	Panda	“All I Ask” by Adele	undisclosed	SAFE
5	Candylabra	“Isang Linggong Pag-ibig” by KZ Tandingan	undisclosed	SAFE
6	Crispy Patty	“Sex Bomb” by Tom Jones	undisclosed	SAFE

=== Week 12 (June 11) ===
No clues were presented during this episode.

Performances on the eleventh episode
#	Stage name	Song	Identity	Result
1	Crispy Patty	“I'd Do Anything for Love (But I Won't Do That)” by Meat Loaf feat. Lorraine Crosby	undisclosed	SAFE
2	Banana	“Oo” by UDD	Jex de Castro	OUT
3	Jeepie	“Kahit Kailan” by South Border	undisclosed	SAFE
4	Candylabra	“Ang Huling El Bimbo” by Eraserheads	undisclosed	SAFE
5	Panda	“Leave the Door Open” by Silk Sonic	undisclosed	SAFE

=== Week 13 (June 18) ===
- Group number: "Butter" by BTS

Performances on the thirteenth episode
#	Stage name	Song	Identity	Result
1	Jeepie	"Heaven Knows" by Rick Price	Arthur Nery	THIRD
2	Candylabra	"Human" by Christina Perri	Marion Aunor	FOURTH
3	Panda	"Lately" by Stevie Wonder	Kris Lawrence	WINNER
4	Crispy Patty	"This Is Me" by Keala Settle	Frenchie Dy	RUNNER-UP

=== Specials (June 25) ===
Awards special
#	Stage name	Celebrity	Award
1	Singkwenta	Mark Carpio	Lover Boy Award
2	Pato Tim	Jeffrey Hidalgo	Bida sa Clues Award
3	Popcorn	Jinky Vidal	Pitch Perfect Award
4	Labuyo	Jovit Baldivino	Rakistar Award
