= Armi Millare =

Filipino musician

- Born: Armi Olbes Millare
- Occupations: Singer; songwriter
- Years active: 2004–present
- Awards: NU Rock Awards Best Female Artist
- Musical career
- Genres: OPM; indie; synthpop
- Instruments: Vocals; piano
- Labels: Temo Recordings; DaWorks Records

Armi Olbes Millare is a Filipino singer best known as the lead vocalist and keyboardist of Filipino alternative rock band Up Dharma Down. On December 26, 2021, Millare left the band due to the lack of transparency from her former label, Terno Recordings.

== Life ==
Since 2006, Millare's band released four albums and toured extensively around the world (including Asia, the Middle East, US and Canada). The BBC tagged them as the "Asian band to most likely to cross over North American shores" while Time has called the band's music "genre-defying" as well as "both thoughtful and sensual." Millare has herself pointed out the diversity of musical influences upon her work, which is spread across different genres. She has emphasised that to follow a few musical styles exclusively would be boring. She strives therefore to balance and combine numerous styles without any necessary single point of stylistic adherence. Her band has garnered critical praise from artists such as Tim Bowness of No-Man, Curt Smith of Tears for Fears, and a collaborative track with Scotland's Paul Buchanan of The Blue Nile.

In 2017, she launched Startup Series where she plays her unreleased tracks, as well as the beloved hits she has created with UDD in new cities, and kicked it off in Berlin and in the UK.

Stoa Sound, the music-producing body of Stoa Studios was founded by Millare writing original music for film, animation and other media, preserving the same vision and attention to detail as the multi-disciplinary brand.

Millare has done work as Munro— an artistic platform featuring a multi-sensory and experimental one-off performance for art festivals and artist residencies. Here she gets to work with multi-media artists utilizing her knowledge in Asian Music as her chosen major in the University of the Philippines College of Music.

Her band UDD released their self-titled fourth album in July 2019.

On December 26, 2021, Millare announced that she would be parting ways with Terno Recordings and as a consequence of that, the band, UDD, as they remained with the label and eventually signed a 2-album deal with Viva Records who then purchased the UDD catalogue through Terno Recordings.

== Discography ==
With Up Dharma Down

- Fragmented (2006, Terno Recordings)
- Bipolar (2008, Terno Recordings)
- Capacities (2012, Terno Recordings)
- U D D (2019, Terno Recordings)

Solo

- "Waiting for a Sign"
- "Eyeliner"
- "Delubyo"
- "Pipikit Ako"
- "An Attempt to Measure Happiness" (Instrumental)
- "Yolanda"
- "Kapit"
- "Two Worlds"
- "Into the Clear"
- "Wrong"

Cover songs

- "Mad World" (Tears for Fears)
- "Tao" from Honor Thy Father Soundtrack – Originally sung by Sampaguita
- "You" – Originally sung by Basil Valdez

Collaboration with D' Sound

Millare collaborated with Norwegian neo-soul band D'Sound for "Lykkelig" (Norwegian word for "happy") and "Somewhere in Between". On October 19, 2018, the music video of "Lykkeli"g was released. The third collaboration she did with D'Sound "Run for Cover" was released on November 19, 2021. The official music video was released the same day as the single release and the video was shot in Manila and in Oslo during COVID-19.

- "Lykkelig"
- "Somewhere in Between"
- "Run for Cover"

=== Art exhibit ===
Millare has also explored in the field of visual arts and was frequently seen with artist Kawayan De Guia in 2011 in Baguio City. She has joined in a visual art exhibit entitled ' In Transit' at CCP. She participated in the group exhibit that ran on September 20, 2015, at the Small Gallery of the Cultural Center of the Philippines. Her work was featured together with musician artists like The Edralins, Kabunyan de Guia, Jazel Kristin, Kanna Magosaki and Geloy Concepcion among others.

== Awards and nominations ==
Year	Award	Category	Nominated work	Result	Ref.
2006	13th NU Rock Awards	Best Female Artist	—N/a	Won	
2006	13th NU Rock Awards	Vocalist of the Year	—N/a	Nominated	
2009	16th NU Rock Awards	Vocalist of the Year	—N/a	Won	
2009	Asia Voice Indie Music Awards (AVIMA)	Best Overall Female Vocalist	—N/a	Won	
2010	Asia Voice Indie Music Awards (AVIMA)	Best Overall Female Vocalist	—N/a	Won	
2014	11th Golden Screen Awards	Best Original Song	"Indak" from the movie Sana Dati (2013)	Nominated	
2014	40th Metro Manila Film Festival	Best Musical Score	English Only, Please	Nominated	
2015	41st Metro Manila Film Festival	Best Original Theme Song	"Tao" from the movie Honor Thy Father (Interpreter)	Won	
2016	32nd PMPC Star Awards for Movies	Movie Musical Scorer of the Year (Indie)	Apocalypse Child (2015)	Nominated	
2016	32nd PMPC Star Awards for Movies	Movie Original Theme Song of the Year (Indie)	"Young Again" from the movie Apocalypse Child	Nominated	
