= Born to Be a Star (TV series) =

- Title card (Season 1)
- Genre: Reality competition
- Created by: TV5; Viva Entertainment
- Directed by: Monti Parungao (season 1); Bobet Vidanes (season 2)
- Presented by: Ogie Alcasid; Mark Bautista; Yassi Pressman; Matteo Guidicelli; Kim Molina
- Judges: Andrew E. Pops Fernandez; Aiza Seguerra; Rico Blanco; Sam Concepcion; Katrina Velarde; Georcelle Dapat-Sy
- Country of origin: Philippines
- Original language: Tagalog
- No. of seasons: 2
- No. of episodes: 46

Production
- Executive producer: Robert P. Galang (season 2)
- Producer: Vic del Rosario
- Camera setup: Multi-camera setup
- Running time: 60 minutes (including commercials)
- Production companies: Cignal Entertainment; Viva Entertainment

Original release
- Network: TV5
- Release: February 6, 2016 – May 8, 2021

Related
- Star for a Night; Search for a Star

Born to Be a Star is a Philippine television reality competition show broadcast by TV5. Originally hosted by Ogie Alcasid, Mark Bautista and Yassi Pressman, it aired first season aired every Sunday nights from February 6 to May 29, 2016, replacing LolaBasyang.com and the rerun of Cool Guys, Hot Ramen and was replaced by Movie Max 5. The show returned for second season aired every Saturday nights from January 23 to May 8, 2021, replacing the first season of Masked Singer Pilipinas and was replaced by the first season of Rolling In It Philippines. Matteo Guidicelli and Kim Molina serve as the final hosts.

The idea was conceived by then-TV5 Entertainment Chief Strategist Vic del Rosario. In early 2010, del Rosario planned to launch BTBAS with Viva talent Sarah Geronimo and the newest Kapatid personality at the time, Willie Revillame as hosts. The later came to fruition when del Rosario joined the ranks of TV5's entertainment department.

The singing competition open for aspiring 13- to 18-year-old singers.

The grand winner of the competition would take home a total of 3 million pesos of prizes including a 1 million-peso cash prize, a management contract from TV5 and Viva Artists Agency and a house and lot.

According to Monti Parungao, the show's director, the contestants would have to pass the two pre-audition processes before they would make it in the competition. In the weekly rounds, four contestants will be introduced per week and in the beginning of the performance, the program tackled the stories (or makings of a star) of the contestants before joining the competition. The winner of the weekly round will undergo make-over sessions and vocal lessons. All winners of the weekly rounds will be qualified for the monthly round, of which one contestant will then move on to the grand finals.

The first grand finals of Born to Be a Star was held on May 29, 2016, with Shanne Dandan as its grand winner.

In October 2020, Viva Entertainment announced that Born to Be a Star would be returning for a second season on TV5, slated to air on January 30, 2021.

The second grand finals of Born to Be a Star was held on May 8, 2021, with Jehramae Trangia as its second grand winner.

== Overview ==
Season	Episodes	Originally aired	
Season	Episodes	Season premiere	Season finale
1	32	February 6, 2016	May 29, 2016
2	14	January 30, 2021	May 8, 2021

== Hosts ==
=== Season 1 ===
- Ogie Alcasid
- Mark Bautista
- Yassi Pressman

=== Season 2 ===
- Matteo Guidicelli
- Kim Molina

== Judges ==
=== Season 1 ===
- Rico Blanco
- Andrew E.
- Pops Fernandez
- Aiza Seguerra

=== Season 2 ===
- Andrew E.
- Sam Concepcion
- Georcelle Dapat-Sy
- Katrina Velarde
- Janine Teñoso

== See also ==
- List of TV5 (Philippine TV network) original programming
