= Masked Singer Pilipinas season 3 =

Masked Singer Pilipinas
- Season 3
- Starring: Arthur Nery; Janno Gibbs; Nadine Lustre; Pops Fernandez
- Hosted by: Billy Crawford
- No. of contestants: 16
- Winner: Pepe Herrera as "Foxtastic Samurai"
- Runner-up: Janine Teñoso as "Jellybabe"
- No. of episodes: 26

Release
- Original network: TV5
- Original release: May 17 – August 17, 2025

Season chronology
- ← Previous; Season 2

The third season of the Philippine television series Masked Singer Pilipinas premiered on TV5 on May 17 to August 17, 2025, replacing Be The Next: 9 Dreamers.

== Production ==
A third season was announced in February 2025 published on the official pages of the show. For the first time in season, the show was aired on weekends, and a live audience was present.

== Panelists and host ==
Billy Crawford was reprised his role as the host, with a new set of panelists of the season. Singer and second season third placer Arthur Nery, singer-comedian Janno Gibbs, singer-actresses Nadine Lustre, and Pops Fernandez.

== Contestants ==
This season features 16 masked celebrities.

| Stage name | Celebrity | Occupation | Week | | | | | | | | | | | | |
| Stage name | Celebrity | Occupation | 1 | 2 | 3 | 4 | 5 | 6 | 7 | 8 | 9 | 10 | 11 | 12 | 13 |
|---|---|---|---|---|---|---|---|---|---|---|---|---|---|---|---|
| Foxtastic Samurai | Pepe Herrera | Comedian | | | | SAFE | | | | SAFE | | SAFE | | SAFE | WINNER |
| Jellybabe | Janine Teñoso | Singer | | | SAFE | | | | SAFE | | | SAFE | | SAFE | RUNNER-UP |
| Astigre | Lloyd Umali | Singer | SAFE | | | | SAFE | | | | SAFE | | SAFE | | THIRD |
| Gagambini | Bayang Barrios | Folk singer | | | | SAFE | | | | SAFE | SAFE | | SAFE | | FOURTH |
| Frog Sinatra | Rob Deniel | Singer | | SAFE | | | | SAFE | | | SAFE | | | OUT | |
| Mr. T | Wilbert Ross | Actor | | | SAFE | | | | SAFE | | | SAFE | OUT | | |
| Monster Showman | Markki Stroem | Singer and actor | SAFE | | | | SAFE | | | | | OUT | | | |
| Kunewho | Anne Ferrer | Singer and model | | | | SAFE | | SAFE | | | OUT | | | | |
| Monkeylabot | Rey "PJ" Abellana | Singer and actor | | | SAFE | | | | | OUT | | | | | |
| Plantita Turner | Allona Villanueva | Singer | SAFE | | | | | | OUT | | | | | | |
| Meowy | Sheree Bautista | Singer and actress | | SAFE | | | | OUT | | | | | | | |
| Susie TV | Yen Durano | Actress | | SAFE | | | OUT | | | | | | | | |
| Aeroboy | Chuckie Dreyfus | Actor | | | | OUT | | | | | | | | | |
| Puppy Love | Ima Castro | Singer | | | OUT | | | | | | | | | | |
| Fantasa | Jenine Desiderio | Singer and actress | | OUT | | | | | | | | | | | |
| Rats to Riches | Pooh | Comedian | OUT | | | | | | | | | | | | |

The masked singer was safe from elimination.
The masked singer was eliminated from the competition and unmasked upon their elimination.
The masked singer did not perform.

== Episodes ==
=== Week 1 (May 17–18) ===
Performances on the first week.
| # | Stage name | Song | Identity | Result |
|---|---|---|---|---|
| 1 | Astigre | "Lips of an Angel" by Hinder | undisclosed | SAFE |
| 2 | Rats to Riches | "Nothing's Gonna Change My Love for You" by George Benson | Pooh | OUT |
| 3 | Monster Showman | "Tadhana" by UDD | undisclosed | SAFE |
| 4 | Plantita Turner | "Creep" by Radiohead | undisclosed | SAFE |

=== Week 2 (May 24–25) ===
Performances on the second week.
| # | Stage name | Song | Identity | Result |
|---|---|---|---|---|
| 1 | Fantasa | "Domino" by Jessie J | Jenine Desiderio | OUT |
| 2 | Susie TV | "Water" by Tyla | undisclosed | SAFE |
| 3 | Frog Sinatra | "Put Your Head on My Shoulder" by Michael Bublé | undisclosed | SAFE |
| 4 | Meowy | "Chandelier" by Sia | undisclosed | SAFE |

=== Week 3 (May 31–June 1) ===
Performances on the third week.
| # | Stage name | Song | Identity | Result |
|---|---|---|---|---|
| 1 | Jelly Babe | "Good Luck, Babe!" by Chappell Roan | undisclosed | SAFE |
| 2 | Monkeylabot | "The Way You Look Tonight" by Frank Sinatra | undisclosed | SAFE |
| 3 | Puppy Love | "I Have Nothing" by Whitney Houston | Ima Castro | OUT |
| 4 | Mr. T | "Like A Virgin" by Madonna | undisclosed | SAFE |

=== Week 4 (June 7–8) ===
Performances on the fourth week.
| # | Stage name | Song | Identity | Result |
|---|---|---|---|---|
| 1 | Kune-Who | "Ikot-Ikot" by Sarah Geronimo | undisclosed | SAFE |
| 2 | Gagambini | "Golden Slumbers" by The Beatles | undisclosed | SAFE |
| 3 | Aero Boy | "Born For You" by David Pomeranz | Chuckie Dreyfus | OUT |
| 4 | Foxtastic Samurai | "Feeling Good" by Nina Simone | undisclosed | SAFE |

=== Week 5 (June 14–15) ===
Performances on the fifth week.
| # | Stage name | Song | Identity | Result |
|---|---|---|---|---|
| 1 | Susie TV | "Salamin, Salamin" by Bini | Yen Durano | OUT |
| 2 | Astigre | "She's Out of My Life" by Michael Jackson | undisclosed | SAFE |
| 3 | Monster Showman | "Titanium" by David Guetta and Sia | undisclosed | SAFE |

=== Week 6 (June 28–29) ===
Performances on the sixth week.
| # | Stage name | Song | Identity | Result |
|---|---|---|---|---|
| 1 | Frog Sinatra | "Doo Bidoo" by APO Hiking Society | undisclosed | SAFE |
| 2 | Meowy | "River" by Bishop Briggs | Sheree Bautista | OUT |
| 3 | Kunewho | "Amakabogera" by Maymay Entrata | undisclosed | SAFE |

=== Week 7 (July 5–6) ===
Performances on the seventh week.
| # | Stage name | Song | Identity | Result |
|---|---|---|---|---|
| 1 | Plantita Turner | "With or Without You" by U2 | Allona Villanueva | OUT |
| 2 | Mr. T | "Let It Be" by The Beatles | undisclosed | SAFE |
| 3 | Jelly Babe | "Iris" by Goo Goo Dolls | undisclosed | SAFE |

=== Week 8 (July 12–13) ===
Performances on the eighth week.
| # | Stage name | Song | Identity | Result |
|---|---|---|---|---|
| 1 | Monkeylabot | "To All the Girls I've Loved Before" by Julio Iglesias and Willie Nelson | Rey "PJ" Abellana | OUT |
| 2 | Foxtastic | "'O sole mio" by Luciano Pavarotti | undisclosed | SAFE |
| 3 | Gagambini | "Araw-Araw" by Ben&Ben | undisclosed | SAFE |

=== Week 9 (July 19–20) ===
Performances on the ninth week.
| # | Stage name | Song | Identity | Result |
|---|---|---|---|---|
| 1 | Kunewho | "Queen of the Night" by Whitney Houston | Anne Ferrer | OUT |
| 2 | Astigre | "There's No Easy Way" by James Ingram | undisclosed | SAFE |
| 3 | Gagambini | "Mangarap Ka" by Wency Cornejo | undisclosed | SAFE |
| 4 | Frog Sinatra | "Hallelujah" by Bamboo | undisclosed | SAFE |

=== Week 10 (July 26–27) ===
Performances on the tenth week.
| # | Stage name | Song | Identity | Result |
|---|---|---|---|---|
| 1 | Mr. T | "Come Together" by The Beatles | undisclosed | SAFE |
| 2 | Jelly Babe | "Dancing Queen" by ABBA | undisclosed | SAFE |
| 3 | Foxtastic Samurai | "Gaya ng Dati" by Gary Valenciano | undisclosed | SAFE |
| 4 | Monster Showman | "The Greatest Show" by Hugh Jackman, Keala Settle, Zac Efron and Zendaya | Markki Stroem | OUT |

=== Week 11 (August 2–3) ===
Performances on the eleventh week.
| # | Stage name | Song | Identity | Result |
|---|---|---|---|---|
| 1 | Mr. T | "Tatsulok" by Buklod | Wilbert Ross | OUT |
| 2 | Gagambini | "Yellow" by Coldplay | Undisclosed | SAFE |
| 3 | Astigre | "I Love You Goodbye" by Celine Dion | Undisclosed | SAFE |

=== Week 12 (August 9–10) ===
Performances on the twelfth week.
| # | Stage name | Song | Identity | Result |
|---|---|---|---|---|
| 1 | Jellybabe | "Drivers License" by Olivia Rodrigo | Undisclosed | SAFE |
| 2 | Frog Sinatra | "My Way" by Frank Sinatra | Rob Deniel | OUT |
| 3 | Foxtastic Samurai | "Upuan" by Gloc-9 | Undisclosed | SAFE |

=== Week 13 (August 16–17) ===
Performances on the thirteenth week.
| # | Stage name | Song | Identity | Result |
|---|---|---|---|---|
| 1 | Astigre | "Kailangan Kita" by Ogie Alcasid | Lloyd Umali | THIRD |
| 2 | Jellybabe | "Die With A Smile" by Bruno Mars and Lady Gaga | Janine Teñoso | RUNNER-UP |
| 3 | Gagambini | "Makita Kang Muli" by Sugarfree | Bayang Barrios | FOURTH |
| 4 | Foxtastic Samurai | "Bohemian Rhapsody" by Queen | Pepe Herrera | WINNER |
