= Masked Singer Pilipinas season 1 =

Philippine reality singing competition television series

Masked Singer Pilipinas
- Season 1
- Title card used in the first season
- Starring: Matteo Guidicelli; Kim Molina; Aga Muhlach; Cristine Reyes
- Hosted by: Billy Crawford
- No. of contestants: 12
- Winner: Daryl Ong as "2-2-B"
- Runner-up: Katrina Velarde as "Diwata"
- No. of episodes: 10

Release
- Original network: TV5
- Original release: October 24 – December 26, 2020

Season chronology
- Next → Season 2

The first season of the Philippine television series Masked Singer Pilipinas premiered on TV5 on October 24, 2020, and concluded on December 26, 2020. The inaugural season was won by Daryl Ong as "2-2-B", with Katrina Velarde as "Diwata" as the runner-up, and Carlyn Ocampo in third place as "Pusa-way".

== Production ==
Viva originally began developing a local Philippine adaptation of the franchise in 2016 with Cesar Montano as the host and GB Sampedro as the director. Two pilot episodes of the series were filmed to be presented to TV5 management with a planned premiere in June 2016. However, the series was eventually shelved due to budget concerns and to some extent disagreements by the audience and the management.

On 24 September 2020, TV5 hinted a new show with a poster of a mysterious mask. This was further confirmed on the same day. The filming of the show started on October 6, 2020.

== Panelists and host ==
Season 1 panelists and host

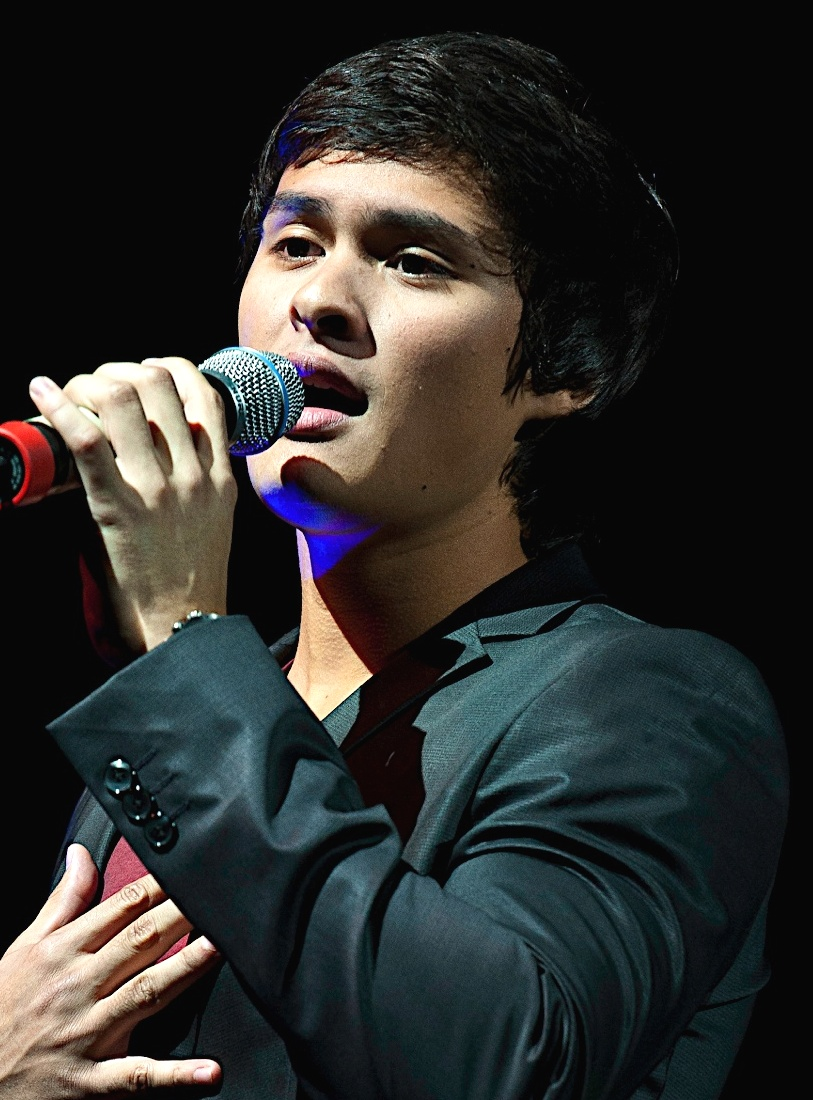
Matteo Guidicelli

Kim Molina

Aga Muhlach

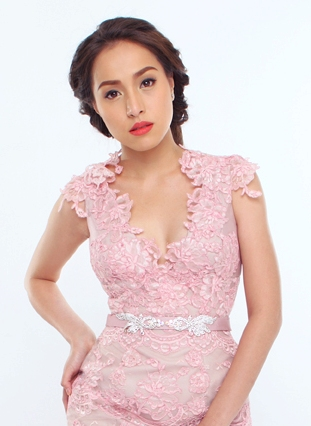
Cristine Reyes

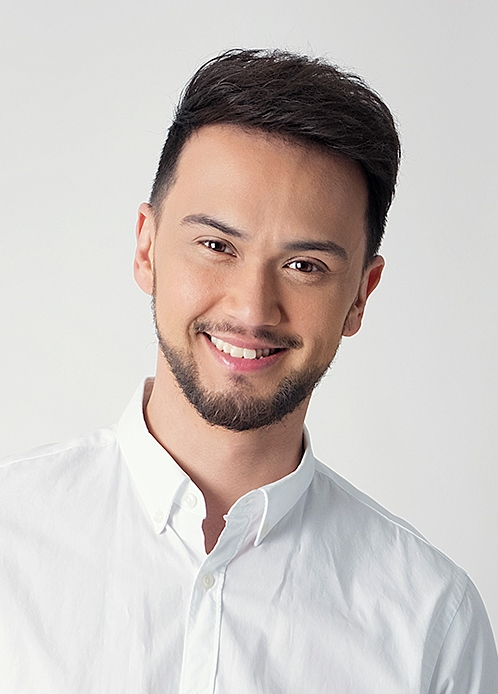
Billy Crawford

In August 2020, Billy Crawford confirmed that he will be hosting a show in October of the same year. On 3 September 2020, Crawford was confirmed to host the show.

On 26 September 2020, Aga Muhlach, Cristine Reyes, Kim Molina, and Matteo Guidicelli were revealed as the permanent panelists of the show. A guest panelist occasionally enters with a mask and joins the four permanent panelists.

Guest panelists regularly joined the panel, appearing onstage with a mask. These included Julia Barretto as "Kitty Perry" in the fourth episode, Hajji Alejandro as "Bantay" in the fifth episode, Nonoy Zuñiga as "Oso Taulava" in the sixth, Sam Concepcion as "Robot Mortiz" in the seventh, and Mark Bautista as "Mask Alvarado" in the eighth. Barretto returned to the panel on the penultimate episode as a guest judge.

== Contestants ==
The first season featured 12 celebrity contestants, all being professional singers.

Stage name	Celebrity	Occupation	Episodes									
Stage name	Celebrity	Occupation	1	2	3	4	5	6	7	8	9	10
2-2-B	Daryl Ong	Singer-songwriter	WIN			SAFE			SAFE		SAFE	WINNER
Diwata	Katrina Velarde	OPM artist		WIN		SAFE				SAFE	SAFE	RUNNER-UP
Pusa-Way	Carlyn Ocampo	Member of Z-Girls	WIN					SAFE	SAFE		SAFE	THIRD
Tikboy	Wency Cornejo	Singer-songwriter			WIN			SAFE		SAFE	OUT	
Valentino	Carl Guevara	Band Vocalist			WIN		SAFE			OUT		
Adarna	Roselle Nava	OPM artist	RISK				SAFE		OUT			
Sea-Reyna	Lolita Carbon	OPM icon			RISK			OUT				
Agila	Joey Generoso	Band vocalist		RISK			OUT					
Marie-Posa	Bituin Escalante	Singer-actress		WIN		OUT						
Bee-Ni-Bee-Ni	Nina	Singer			OUT							
Syokoy	Meds Marfil	Band vocalist		OUT								
Aspin	Renz Verano	OPM artist	OUT									

The masked singer won their face-off and remained in the competition.
The masked singer lost their face-off and was in the bottom two, but was not eliminated.
The masked singer was safe from elimination.
The masked singer was eliminated from the competition and unmasked upon their elimination.
The masked singer did not perform.

== Episodes ==
=== Week 1 (24 October) ===
Performances on the first episode
#	Stage name	Song	Identity	Result
1	Pusa-way	"Bang Bang" by Jessie J, Ariana Grande and Nicki Minaj	undisclosed	WIN
2	Aspin	"I'm Yours" by Jason Mraz	Renz Verano	OUT
3	Adarna	"Dyosa" by Yumi Lacsamana	undisclosed	RISK
4	2-2-B	"Rock with You" by Michael Jackson	undisclosed	WIN

=== Week 2 (31 October) ===
Performances on the second episode
#	Stage name	Song	Identity	Result
1	Agila	"You Give Love a Bad Name" by Bon Jovi	undisclosed	RISK
2	Diwata	"Hindi Tayo Pwede" by The Juans	undisclosed	WIN
3	Marie-posa	"Bad Guy" by Billie Eilish	undisclosed	WIN
4	Syokoy	"Heaven" by Bryan Adams	Meds Marfil	OUT

=== Week 3 (7 November) ===
Performances on the third episode
#	Stage name	Song	Identity	Result
1	Bee-Ni-Bee-Ni	"Big Spender" by Shirley Bassey	Nina	OUT
2	Tikboy	"Times Like These" by Foo Fighters	undisclosed	WIN
3	Sea-Reyna	"Hand in My Pocket" by Alanis Morissette	undisclosed	RISK
4	Valentino	"Titanium" by David Guetta	undisclosed	WIN

=== Week 4 (14 November) ===
Performances on the fourth episode
#	Stage name	Song	Identity	Result
1	Marie-posa	"Sweet Child o' Mine" by Guns N' Roses	Bituin Escalante	OUT
2	2-2-B	"The Nearness of You" by Norah Jones	undisclosed	SAFE
3	Diwata	"Somewhere" by Barbra Streisand	undisclosed	SAFE

=== Week 5 (21 November) ===
Performances on the fifth episode
#	Stage name	Song	Identity	Result
1	Adarna	"Kilometro" by Sarah Geronimo	undisclosed	SAFE
2	Valentino	"Careless Whisper" by George Michael	undisclosed	SAFE
3	Agila	"Forever" by Kenny Loggins	Joey Generoso	OUT

=== Week 6 (28 November) ===
Performances on the sixth episode
#	Stage name	Song	Identity	Result
1	Pusa-Way	"When I Grow Up" by The Pussycat Dolls	undisclosed	SAFE
2	Tikboy	"Anak" by Freddie Aguilar	undisclosed	SAFE
3	Sea-Reyna	"Every Breath You Take" by The Police	Lolita Carbon	OUT

=== Week 7 (5 December) ===
Performances on the seventh episode
#	Stage name	Song	Identity	Result
1	Adarna	"Proud Mary" by Tina Turner	Roselle Nava	OUT
2	Pusa-Way	"End of Time" by Beyoncé	undisclosed	SAFE
3	2-2-B	"Kiss from a Rose" by Seal	undisclosed	SAFE

=== Week 8 (12 December) ===
Performances on the eighth episode
#	Stage name	Song	Identity	Result
1	Diwata	"On Bended Knee" by Boyz II Men	undisclosed	SAFE
2	Valentino	"A Million Dreams" by Ziv Zaifman, Hugh Jackman and Michelle Williams	Carl Guevarra	OUT
3	Tikboy	"Chandelier" by Sia	undisclosed	SAFE

=== Week 9 (19 December) ===
Performances on the ninth episode
#	Stage name	Song	Identity	Result
1	Diwata	"Lady Marmalade" by Labelle	undisclosed	SAFE
2	2-2-B	"How Am I Supposed to Live Without You" by Michael Bolton	undisclosed	SAFE
3	Pusa-way	"Look at Me Now" by Chris Brown	undisclosed	SAFE
4	Tikboy	"O Holy Night" by Mariah Carey	Wency Cornejo	OUT

=== Week 10 (26 December) ===
Performances on the tenth episode
#	Stage name	Song	Identity	Result
1	Pusa-Way	"Power" by Little Mix	Carlyn Ocampo	THIRD
2	Diwata	"Sana Maulit Muli" by Regine Velasquez	Katrina Velarde	RUNNER-UP
3	2-2-B	"One Last Cry" by Brian McKnight	Daryl Ong	WINNER
