= Jex de Castro =

Filipino singer

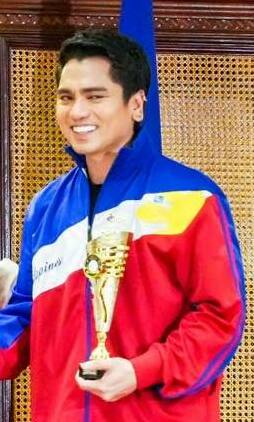
- De Castro in 2023

Background information
- Born: Jex Marc de Castro; 1988 or 1989 (age 37–38)
- Instrument: Vocals
- Label: Viva Records
- Formerly of: Manila Philharmonic Orchestra

Jex Marc de Castro (born 1988 or 1989) is a Filipino singer.

== Early life ==
De Castro was born into poverty, and was unable to finish high school. Coming from a family of singers, de Castro joined multiple local singing contests.

== Career ==
One of his first wins was the Hiyas ng Sining in 2005, where he became the grand champion.

He would eventually be able to join the Manila Philharmonic Orchestra as a wedding singer in 2016.

This would lead him to join the first season of the revived Tawag ng Tanghalan (TNT) song competition of noontime variety show It's Showtime of ABS-CBN in 2017. He failed to place but returned in the TNT All-Star Grand Resbak in 2019 to finish as runner-up. He lost to Mark Michael Garcia in the final. De Castro performed "Listen" by Beyoncé and a medley of songs by Sarah Geronimo.

He would take part in various different theater productions such as Lion King: The Musical in 2014. He was selected to record the gospel song "Sa Piling Ko" which was a theme song by the television special, In My Father's Arms.

De Castro would secure a recording contract with Viva Records. In 2022, he joined season two of Masked Singer Pilipinas of TV5. In the competition where contestant's concealed their identities in costumes, de Castro dressed in a banana costume and was a semi-finalist.

De Castro would join the 2023 Stars of the Albion Grand Prix in London upon recommendation by Vega Entertainment Productions. He was able to join after a successful fundraiser, and bagged the title as the fifth Filipino to do so after Rachel Gabreza (2018), Marlon Macabaya (2019), Reign Macalinao (2020), and Danielle Soliman (2021). His feat was recognized by President Bongbong Marcos.

== Personal life ==
De Castro has a younger brother whose education he helped fund. His brother eventually became an architect.
