= Katrina Velarde =

Filipino singer (born 1994)

- Velarde in 2026
- Born: Katrina Copino Velarde; December 5, 1994 (age 31); Tondo, Manila, Philippines
- Occupation: Singer
- Years active: 2012–present
- Spouse: Mike Shapiro (m. 2021; died 2021)
- Musical career
- Genres: OPM; R&B; Pop; ballad
- Instrument: Vocals
- Label: Viva Records
- Website: Katrina Velarde Official

Katrina Copino Velarde (born December 5, 1994) is a Filipino singer known for her vocal range and belting technique. Dubbed as The Vocal Supreme by the media for her covers and vocal impersonations that grew online fame. She joined The X Factor Philippines and rose to prominence following her runner-up finished on the reality show Masked Singer Pilipinas. She also made her theatrical debut as she played the role of 'Orvaya' in "Inday: The Musical".

In 2019, Velarde released her debut EP "SiKat Ako" under Viva Records. In the same year, she staged her first solo major concert 'Sikat Ako' at the New Frontier Theater in Manila, followed by 'Sikat i2' last November 2019. During the pandemic in 2020, she joined Masked Singer Pilipinas as Diwata and grew online fame.

She gained further international acclaim after representing the Philippines to perform in the 2020 Firdaus Holiday Experience at the Expo City Dubai with Firdaus Orchestra.

In 2025, Velarde recognized globally as she collaborated with the American pop group 98 Degrees on a re-recording of the hit single "I Do (Cherish You)".

Her work has earned her a number of nominations from various award-giving bodies, including an Awit Award, a PMPC Star Awards for Music which includes her Female R&B Artist of the Year award and a Golden Screen Award.

== Life ==
Born and raised in Tondo, Manila, Velarde started to join singing contest at age 7 to help her family's financial difficulties. She also sold Sampaguita lei made by her mother. Velarde was known as a veteran contender in singing contests. She became part of Little Big Star hosted by Sarah Geronimo together with her batch mate Charice Pempengco and Sam Concepcion.

Velarde married Mark Shapiro in May 2021 in Tagaytay. However, months after he passed away on November 14, 2021.

== Career ==
=== 2011: TV5's Talentadong Pinoy ===
Velarde alongside Alyssa Quijano and Jennifer Maravilla formed the group New Born Divas to join the second season of Talentadong Pinoy, one of the most popular reality talent shows of its time. After posting consecutive wins, the group was named the 11th Hall of Famer.

=== 2012: ABS-CBN's The X Factor Philippines ===
After New Born Divas disbanded, she joined The X Factor Philippines season 1 as a solo act. She sang "Dangerously in Love" by Beyoncé and got four yeses from the judges. On her bootcamp performance, Velarde sang (You Make Me Feel Like) A Natural Woman by Aretha Franklin. After that audition, the judges called the names of Velarde, Alyssa Quijano, Auriette Divina, Monique Lualhati, Jhelsea Flores and Ashley Campbell to inform them that they were chosen as the last act in groups category that made it to the Top 20 and it was mentored by Gary Valenciano. At the judges' home visit, A.K.A. J.A.M. performed Seasons of Love by the cast of Rent the musical and made it to the top 12. On the first week of their live show, their group performed Got to Be Real by Cheryl Lynn. On the second week, they performed This Is My Life (La vita) by Shirley Bassey. On the third week of their live show performance, A.K.A. J.A.M. performed Survivor by Destiny's Child. Unfortunately, their group didn't make it to the next level after losing to Daddy's Home via text votes of 4.42% and 5.53%, respectively.

=== 2013: Suklay Diva ===
After she uploaded a video of herself singing Dangerously In Love 2 by Beyoncé while holding a plastic comb as her microphone, netizens started calling her Suklay Diva (Comb Diva). It went viral after catching the attention of the netizens and started to gain international fame through social media. Her video went viral after Chris Brown and Beyoncé's guitarist Bibi McGill shared it on social media from worldstarhiphop.com and became a female talent of the week. Because of her viral video. Velarde got an invitation to showcase her talent on The Ellen DeGeneres Show a segment that open its door for Filipino singer and internet sensation like Charice Pempengco. But due to her Bell's palsy condition, Velarde turned down the offer.

=== 2014–2019: TV5 career ===
Velarde became part of TV5's weekly drama series "Trenderas" with Isabella de Leon and Lara Maigue where she played the role of Diva Salambangon. Her natural wit and sense of humor brought her to nomination at the 2015 Golden Screen Awards as Outstanding Breakthrough Performance by an Actress. In 2015, she also played a main role in TV5's Wattpad presents #Bitterella.

Velarde had a chance to showcase her talent on Wish 107.5 Bus YouTube channel singing her rendition of Go The Distance by Michael Bolton. Because of her ability to imitate local and international singers, she started to upload a video of her song covers that became popular to some foreign reactors on YouTube.

In 2017, Velarde released her single "Lason Mong Halik" composed by the renowned Filipino composer Vehnee Saturno and produced by Viva Records (Philippines). It is considered as her most popular song with over 81 million streams on Youtube.

In October 2018, Velarde performed in the 2018 Philippine Popular Music Festival, an annual songwriting competition organized by the Philpop MusicFest Foundation. She interpreted "Tama Na", an original song written by Michael Rodriguez & Jeanne Columbine Rodriguez which was chosen as one of the 10 finalists and nominated as Best Ballad Recording by the 32nd Awit Awards. Velarde sang theme songs for VIVA films "Magkaibang Mundo", the Original Sound Track of the movie Just A Stranger starring Anne Curtis and Marco Gumabao. Followed by "Isang Himala" from the box office movie Miracle in Cell No. 7 (2019 Philippine film) written by Miguel Mendoza which also nominated as Movie Theme Song of the Year by the PMPC Star Awards for Movies.

Velarde released her first album Sikat Ako. The title of her album was based on her first solo major concert last February 2019 where Regine Velasquez surprised and joined her for a duet of "Araw Gabi". Due to its success, it follows her 2nd major solo concert called "SiKat i2", where she also have been nominated as Female Concert Performer of the Year.

=== 2020–present: The Vocal Supreme ===
She later joined Masked Singer Pilipinas 2020 as DIWATA where she became 1st runner up over Daryl Ong and also served as a judge on a reality singing competition Born to Be a Star.

Velarde has often been referred to as "The Vocal Supreme" since her performance in Firdaus Holiday Experience at the Expo City Dubai with Firdaus Orchestra in December 2022, where she represented the Philippines. She performed her single "Isang Himala", the official soundtrack of the box office movie Miracle in Cell No. 7 (2019 Philippine film), "Hindi Tayo Pwede" from The Juans and "Pasko Na Sinta Ko" by Gary Valenciano.

Following the pandemic, Velarde released her single, "Ako Ba O Siya?", an original composition by Vehnee Saturno. This song was also used as the theme for the Philippine television drama series, "Minsan pa Nating Hagkan ang Nakaraan", broadcast by TV5.

In February 2024, Velarde released her new single under Viva Records "Ika'y Nag-iisa", a Carlo Espinosa-written ballad produced by the Awit Award winning producer Civ Fontanilla Carlo and it's used as a theme song for TV5's drama series "Lumuhod Ka Sa Lupa". Velarde undergone appendectomy last March 2024 then suddenly recovered. She also shared that she supposed to join in American Idol and invited to compete at Britain's Got Talent but suddenly declined the offer.

In April 2024, Velarde staged herself to another concert called "Z Con: The Gen Z Icon Concert" at the Samsung Performing Arts Theater. She also awarded as the "Female R&B Artist of the Year" of the 14th PMPC Star Awards for Music for her single "Sa Panaginip" under Viva Records.

In March 2025, Velarde teamed up with the American boyband 98 Degrees on a remake of 'I do (Cherish You)'. Jeff Timmons, a member of the pop group said that "she's basically like a Mariah Carey, Whitney Houston-type as you could tell by her music and, especially the way she showcased on 'I Do' in her interpretation." She was supposed to perform in the "98 Degrees Live In Manila" concert but she has undergone surgery that's why Jona Viray replaced her.

In October 2026, Velarde returned to the stage as she steps into the role of 'Orvaya' in "Inday: The Musical" an original theatrical production by Studio A Production.

== Musical Style ==
Katrina performing in 2023

=== Power Belting & Vocal Range ===
She is known for her high-energy belting capability and range (lyric coloratura soprano), being able to handle high-demanding anthems and power ballads.

=== Intricate Melismata and Riffs ===
She executes fast, complex vocal runs and riffs with pitch-accurate precision rather than just sliding through notes.

=== Dynamic Control & Texturing ===
While known for explosive belting, her style also incorporates controlled breathiness, emotional vocal grit/cries, and moments of intimate restraint.

=== R&B and Groove Inflections ===
In projects like her single "Sa Panaginip" (written by Thyro Alfaro), she has expanded past traditional birit standards into slick, feel-good, R&B-pop grooves and soulful styling.

=== Vocal Mimicry and Versatility ===
She possesses a rare ability to impersonate the distinct vocal colors, vibratos, and styles of various local and international icons (such as Regine Velasquez, Mariah Carey, Celine Dion, Christina Aguilera, Beyoncé, and Whitney Houston), which often colors her live performances and covers.

== Discography ==
=== Studio Album ===
Year	Title
2019	SiKat Ako: Released: January 11, 2019; Formats: CD, Digital download

=== Singles ===
Title	Original soundtrack of	Album
Isang Dakot Na Luha	Isang Dakot Na Luha	
Leron Leron Sinta		Awit At Laro
Tama Na		SiKat Ako
Ikaw Pa Rin		SiKat Ako
Kung Naging Tayong Dalawa		SiKat Ako
Magkaibang Mundo	Just A Stranger	
Lason Mong Halik		
Isang Himala	Miracle in Cell No. 7 (2019 Philippine film)	
Sunlight ft. Daryl Ong		
Balang Araw (with BuDaKhel)		
Love Me Now (ft. Daryl Ong)		
Mahal Pa Kita		
Sa Panaginip		
Tililing	Tililing	
Hindi Tayo Pwede	Minsan pa Nating Hagkan ang Nakaraan	
Ika’y Nag-iisa	Lumuhod Ka Sa Lupa	

== Concerts ==
=== Headlining ===
List of headlining concerts, with dates and venues.
Title	Date	Venue	City	Ref(s)
SiKat Ako	February 1, 2019	New Frontier Theater	Cubao, Quezon City	
SiKat Ako i2	November 29, 2019	New Frontier Theater	Cubao, Quezon City	
Katrina Velarde: Live In Doha, Qatar	January 3, 2020	Al Arabi Sports Club	Doha, Qatar	
Z Con: The Gen Z Icon Concert	April 13, 2024	Samsung Performing Arts Theater	Circuit Makati	

=== Co-Headlining ===
List of co-headlining concerts, with co-headliners, dates, and venues.
Title	Date	Venue	City	Ref(s)
Gary V Presents	July 15 – 16, 2016	Kia Theatre	Cubao, Quezon City	
ANNEKULIT: PROMISE, LAST NA ‘TO! in Winnipeg	March 17, 2019	Centennial Concert Hall	Downtown Winnipeg	
Louie Ocampo 'Composer Ka Lang' The Valentine Concert	February 4 – 5 and 15 – 16, 2023	The Theatre at Solaire	Aceana Avenue Entertainment City	
BuDaKhel Live in Cebu	September 23, 2023	Mandaue City Sports and Cultural Complex	Mandaue City	
The Music of Cecile Azarcon "A 45th Anniversary Concert	May 24 – 25, 2024	The Theatre at Solaire	Parañaque City	

== Filmography ==
=== Television ===
Year	Title	Role	Notes	Ref(s)
2014	Trenderas	Diva Salambangon	Main Cast	
2015	Wattpad presents #Bitterella	Ella	Main Role	

=== As a group ===
Year	Title	Notes	Ref(s)
2010	Eat Bulaga: Let’s Sing Eat!	Contestant (New Born Divas)	
2011	Talentadong Pinoy	Contestant (New Born Divas)	
2012	The X Factor Philippines	Contestant (AKA JAM)	
2013	It’s Showtime: Bida Kapamilya	Contestant (AKA JAM)	

=== As herself ===
Year	Title	Notes	Ref(s)
2018	ASAP: ASAP Versus	Performer	
2019	GGV	Performer	
2020	Masked Singer Pilipinas	Contestant, runner up (DIWATA)	
2021	Born to Be a Star	Judge	
2022	All-Out Sundays	Performer	
2022	Sing Galing	Performer	
2023–present	ASAP Natin 'To	Performer	
2023	Stars of All Seasons	Judge	
2024	Tawag ng Tanghalan Kids	Judge	
2024	I Can See Your Voice	Guest Star	
2025	It's Showtime: Hide & Sing	Celebrity Singer	
2025	Your Face Sounds Familiar (season 4)	Round 5 Guest Performer as Regine Velasquez	

== Accolades ==
Year	Award-giving Body/Critics	Award(s)/Category	Nominated work	Result	Ref.
2015	Golden Screen TV Awards	Breakthrough Performance by an Actress	Trenderas	Nominated	
2018	Philippine Popular Music Festival	Best Song	"Tama Na"	Top 10	
2019	32nd Awit Awards	Best Ballad Recording	"Tama Na"	Nominated	
2020	33rd Awit Awards	Best Song Written for Movie/TV/ Stage	"Magkaibang Mundo" (Just A Stranger)	Nominated	
2021	36th PMPC Star Awards for Movies	Movie Theme Song of the Year	"Isang Himala" (Miracle in Cell No. 7 (2019 Philippine film))	Nominated	
2021	12th Star Awards for Music	Female Concert Performer of the Year	SiKat i2 (Concert)	Nominated	
2024	14th Star Awards for Music	Female R&B Artist of the Year	"Sa Panaginip"	Won	
2024	16th Star Awards for Music	Female Recording Artist of the Year	"Ako Ba O Siya?"	Nominated	
