= Fill in the Bank =

2020–21 Philippine defunct television game show

- Genre: Game show
- Created by: Reeza Belo
- Developed by: Archangel Media
- Written by: Reeza Belo; Cecilia Letecia Matutina; Edwin Serrano
- Directed by: Noel Cabacungan; Neil Gabriel; John Lapus
- Presented by: Jose Manalo; Pokwang
- Narrated by: Camille Hirro
- Country of origin: Philippines
- Original language: Filipino
- No. of episodes: 103

Production
- Executive producers: Robert P. Galang; Anabelle Macauba
- Producers: Michael B. Tuviera; Jojo C. Oconer
- Production locations: TV5 Media Center, Mandaluyong, Metro Manila, Philippines
- Camera setup: Multiple-camera setup
- Running time: 60 minutes (with commercials)
- Production companies: Archangel Media; Cignal Entertainment

Original release
- Network: TV5
- Release: August 15, 2020 – March 31, 2021

Related
- Sing Galing

Fill in the Bank is a Philippine television game show broadcast by TV5. Hosted by Jose Manalo and Pokwang, it aired on the network's TodoMax Primetime Singko line up and worldwide on Kapatid Channel from August 15, 2020 to March 31, 2021, and was replaced by Sing Galing!.

== Final hosts ==
Final hosts

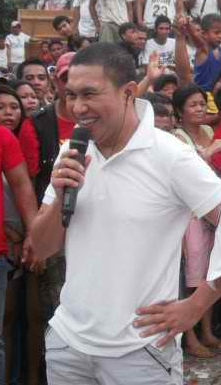
Jose Manalo

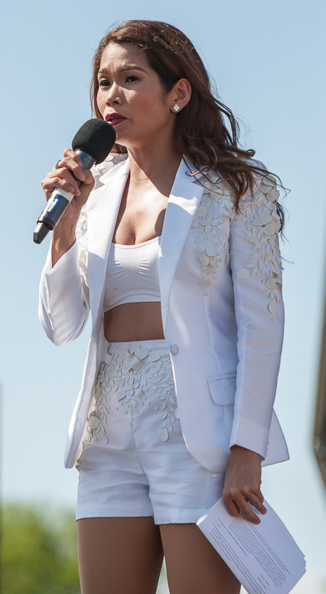
Pokwang

- Jose Manalo as "Manedyer" the CEO, Chief Echuserong Officer
- Pokwang as "Madam Poky" the CFO, Chismosang Falakang Officer

=== Featuring ===
- Alexa Miro as Bank Teller Alexa
- Hershey Neri as Bank Teller Hershey
- CJ Hirro as Sirit
- Tuesday Vargas as Teller Trainee
- Benjie Paras as Delivery Guy Tiny
- Gardo Versoza as Eggpie / Cupcake
- Wilma Doesnt as Wilma Does
- Teri Onor as Terri Yakki
- Sam Y.G. as Samir Samir
- Boobsie Wonderland as Boobsie
- Jerald Napoles as Tom Gutz
- Kris Bernal

== Format ==
Two contestants vie for the chance to win big bucks in the "Juan Bank" and make it all the way to the jackpot round in order to keep their earnings. The four rounds of games the contestants go through are the following:

- Enter Your Pin Code - Correctly go through the process of withdrawing money at the ATM (Ayuda 'Teh Machine) within two minutes, with the correct debit card of their choice and corresponding pin. The cards are divided into three pools: 1 out of 4 bronze cards worth P10,000, 1 out of 6 silver cards worth P20,000, and 1 out of 8 gold cards worth P30,000. The maximum prize possible is P60,000.
- Deposit Silip - A guessing game in which contestants try to guess the amount of the money banks by each person or owner presented as close as they can without going overboard. The maximum prize is set at P50,000.
- Coin/Gold Rush - Similar to Eat Bulaga's former segments such as Hakot All You Can and Hakot Pa More!, the contestants try to race against time while gathering as much coins as they can using only their hands and arms. After one minute, the weight of their gathered coins (in kilograms) will be multiplied by P1,000 and added to their earnings. If either one goes a rare special variable, he/she will has his money doubled.
- Jackpot Round: Huli Cash - Similar to Eat Bulaga's Lucky Truck (based on Wowowee's Cash Motto and the Wowowillie and Wowowin segment Cash Salo), pieces of confetti (bills) worth the value of their previous earnings are sent flying in a wind chamber (deemed as the "bank vault"), all up for the lone contestant to collect within one minute, with a single blue bill included worth an extra P10,000. The maximum prize is set at P150,000.

The consolation prize for the losing contestant after round 3 is set at P15,000.

=== Former ===
- Cheque or X - A guessing game in which contestants try to guess the retail value of the items or services presented as close as they can without going overboard. The maximum prize is set at P50,000.

== Episodes ==
No.	Original release date	Guest(s)
1	August 15, 2020	Ronnie Alonte as Jerome Ponce
2	August 17, 2020	Aubrey Miles as Jacq Yu
3	August 19, 2020	Robert Bolick as Matthew Wright
4	August 21, 2020	EJ Laure as Eya Laure
5	August 24, 2020	Archie Alemania as Ketchup Eusebio
6	August 26, 2020	Ria Atayde as Jane Oineza
7	August 28, 2020	Saicy Aguila as Sunshine Garcia
8	August 31, 2020	Krissy Achino as Baninay Bautista
9	September 2, 2020	Afril Arandia as Toni G.
10	September 4, 2020	Alphard Robles as Jericho Tabangcura
11	September 7, 2020	Charles Carolino as Josh Villanueva
12	September 9, 2020	Maureen Garcia as Sheila Paralejas
13	September 11, 2020	Jang "Alex" Hinsik as Kramer Sim Kyong Ok
14	September 14, 2020	Vergelle Ijan Gamboa as Michelle Pojas
15	September 16, 2020	Mark Luigi Farol as Christian Paul Quimbo
16	September 18, 2020	Candy Pangilinan as Tuesday Vargas
17	September 21, 2020	Charles Rivera Leyva as Ricky Magaan
18	September 23, 2020	Gennylyn Kaye Gallarin as John Patrick Guzman
19	September 25, 2020	Kathrina Manahan as Althea Vega
20	September 28, 2020	MC Dante Derla as Darwin Ramores
21	September 30, 2020	Joyce Fenwick as Anna Jennings
22	October 2, 2020	Aleli Joy Tino as Liezel Villanueva
23	October 5, 2020	Anthony Bagamano as Christian Pacurib
24	October 7, 2020	Rona Pasia as Andrew Razon
25	October 9, 2020	Daryl Ong as Angeline Quinto
26	October 12, 2020	John Lester Gelido as John Lloyd Salonga
27	October 13, 2020	April Cruz as Juliet Bajar
28	October 15, 2020	Richard Asido as CJ Demata
29	October 19, 2020	Regine Bendiola as Jeanybib Buceta
30	October 20, 2020	Angeniel Davila as Johnny Villanueva
31	October 22, 2020	Ivan Carapiet as Troy Montero
32	October 26, 2020	Kaila Napolis as Jylyn Nicanor
33	October 27, 2020	Kat Fallaria as Ron Poe
34	October 29, 2020	Epy Quizon as Eric Quizon
35	November 2, 2020	Sincerely Yours 98 as Yghngjhyll
36	November 3, 2020	Lee Bueno as Adrian Simpas
37	November 5, 2020	Allan Artera as Tyronne James Escalante
38	November 9, 2020	Pearl Casabuena as Shen Santillan
39	November 10, 2020	Maricar Derecho as Christine Arroyo
40	November 12, 2020	Danny Cortezano as Jerald Felicidario
41	November 16, 2020	Lotlot De Leon as Matet De Leon
42	November 17, 2020	Phil Joseph Basa as William Borbon
43	November 19, 2020	Kris Bernal as Isabelle de Leon
44	November 23, 2020	Apple David as Bea Escudero
45	November 24, 2020	Romeo Dela Cruz as Mark Anthony Sorita
46	November 26, 2020	Joem Bascon as Jake Cuenca
47	November 30, 2020	JR Macatangay as William Insinares
48	December 1, 2020	Joy Ann Buenvinida as Merry Joy Morales
49	December 3, 2020	Gladys Reyes as Judy Ann Santos
50	December 7, 2020	Jeff Moreno as Jhon
51	December 8, 2020	Ryan as Jeffrey Aguillon
52	December 10, 2020	Inna Alvarez as Eliza Cruz
53	December 11, 2020	Joshua Caro as Herbert Velasquez
54	December 14, 2020	Janine Buenrostro as Cyril Santiago
55	December 15, 2020	Alexis Ramirez as Vangie Castillo
56	December 16, 2020	Alexandra Abdon as Bella Ysmael
57	December 17, 2020	Nico Castalaone as Reghie Quino
58	December 18, 2020	Raymong "Momon" Cruz as Marco "Piza" Tagulao
59	December 21, 2020	Emmanuel Pastor as Christian Ty
60	December 22, 2020	Clark Banzon as Kimberly Arcillas
61	December 23, 2020	Rosenda Makuha as Analy Magana
62	December 24, 2020	Ryan Araña as Beau Belga
63	December 28, 2020	Kim Last as Kenneth Medrano
64	December 29, 2020	Ron Kennet Adet as Junel Alejo
65	December 30, 2020	Love Quisano as Clarysse Bantay
66	January 4, 2021	Sam Peralta as Matt Aquino
67	January 5, 2021	Love Rose Flores as Joanna Buensuceso
68	January 6, 2021	Vince Mendoza as MJ Arla
69	January 11, 2021	Charlene Habitan as Jenny Rose Bona
70	January 12, 2021	Jeremy King as Kat-Kat Dasalla
71	January 13, 2021	Jomel Lapides as Florence Maramba
72	January 18, 2021	Tess Bomb as Mosang
73	January 19, 2021	Chinita Lakwatsera as Julia Bareta
74	January 20, 2021	John Robert Tayag as Jayson Jayari
75	January 25, 2021	Cesar Coz as Nemerson Soriano
76	January 26, 2021	Kathleen Ann dela Paz as Charry Ann Mhay Galon
77	January 27, 2021	Pash Santillan as Rocy Cajandab
78	February 1, 2021	Ella Cruz as Krystal Reyes
79	February 2, 2021	Allan Salamanca as Roniel Castro
80	February 3, 2021	Pamela Puertollano as Marie Conie Posecion
81	February 8, 2021	William Thio as Gina Bataliran
82	February 9, 2021	Julius Ray Villoso as Jhun-Jhun de Joya Jr.
83	February 10, 2021	Martin Chua as Kevin Ty
84	February 15, 2021	Paolo Ballesteros as Wally Bayola
85	February 16, 2021	Bevs Cumla as Ninio Bathan
86	February 17, 2021	Jaynell Polizon as Pia Magana
87	February 22, 2021	Arvie Gumansing as Wilson Barangot
88	February 24, 2021	PJ dela Cruz as Tan Sultan
89	February 26, 2021	Jennica Garcia-Uytingco as Alwyn Uytingco
90	March 1, 2021	Camille Bernardo as Zane Angue
91	March 3, 2021	Joel Baldago as Janine Nicandro
92	March 5, 2021	Elijah Canlas as Kokoy de Santos
93	March 8, 2021	Claudia Castelli as Amaka Blessing
94	March 10, 2021	Ken as Geoff Roco
95	March 12, 2021	Aira Bermudez as Hopia Boleche
96	March 15, 2021	Abra as Dello Gatmaitan
97	March 17, 2021	Mark Baracael as Silas da Silva
98	March 19, 2021	Joshua de Sequera as Jayvee Sumagaysay
99	March 22, 2021	Lotlot Bustamante as Andi Fei
100	March 24, 2021	Maynard Llames as Benjie Dorango
101	March 26, 2021	Eunice Lagusad as Trina Legaspi
102	March 29, 2021	Jayson Gainza as Pepe Herrera
103	March 31, 2021	Gio Alvarez as Polo Ravales

== See also ==
- List of TV5 (Philippine TV network) original programming
- Kapatid Channel
