= Sing Galing! =

Philippine musical videoke singing reality game show

- Title poster
- Also known as: Sing Galing: The Trio-oke Showdown (2004); Sing Galing ni Pops (2004–05)
- Genre: Videoke reality Game show
- Created by: TV5 Network
- Directed by: Mel Feliciano (2021–22); Bjoy Balagtas (2025–26)
- Presented by: Ai-Ai delas Alas (1998–2004); Allan K. (1998–2004); John Lapus (2004–05); Kristine Florendo (1998); Pops Fernandez (2004–05); 2nd incarnation hosts (2021–22; 2025–26): Randy Santiago; K Brosas; Donita Nose
- Country of origin: Philippines
- Original languages: Tagalog; English
- No. of seasons: 3

Production
- Executive producers: Robert P. Galang (2021–22); Isabel P. Santillan; Peter Edward Dizon; Jane J. Basas (2025–26); Guido R. Zaballero (2025–26); Victorico P. Vargas (2026); Vic del Rosario Jr. (2025–26)
- Production locations: Cornerstone Studios, Quezon City, Philippines (2021–22); Studio A, TV5 Broadcast Complex, 762 Quirino Highway, Novaliches, Quezon City, Philippines (1998–2005, 2022 and 2025–26)
- Camera setup: Multicamera
- Running time: 30 minutes (Sunday, as Sing Galing! Sing-lebrity Edition Season 2, September 28, – March 1, 2026, Saturday, as Sing Galing! Sing-lebrity Edition Season 2, March 7 – March 28, 2026); 45 minutes (Monday, Tuesday and Thursday (2021–22); Saturday, May 17–August 2, 2025; and Sunday, May 18–August 3, 2025, Sunday); 90 minutes (Saturday, as Sing Galing: Sing-lebrity Edition and Sing Galing Kids, 2021–22; and from March 29 to May 3, 2025); 75 minutes (Saturday, March 1–22, 2025; Saturday, as Sing Galing! Sing-lebrity Edition Season 2, September 27, 2025 – February 28, 2026, Sunday, as Sing Galing! Sing-lebrity Edition Season 2, March 8,– April 5, 2026)
- Production companies: MQuest Ventures; MavenPro

Original release
- Network: ABC
- Release: March 6, 1998 – April 30, 2005
- Network: TV5
- Release: April 5, 2021 – December 22, 2022
- Release: March 1, 2025 – April 5, 2026

Sing Galing! (formerly Sing Galing: The Trio-oke Showdown and Sing Galing ni Pops) is a Philippine television karaoke game show broadcast by ABC/TV5. Originally hosted by Ai-Ai delas Alas, Allan K., and Kristine Florendo. It aired on ABC from March 6, 1998 to April 30, 2005. The show returned on TV5's TodoMax Primetime Singko line up and worldwide on Kapatid Channel from April 5, 2021 to December 22, 2022, replacing Bawal na Game Show and Fill in the Bank and was replaced by the rerun of Encounter. Randy Santiago, K Brosas and Donita Nose serve as the hosts for Seasons 1–2 (2nd incarnation). On June 20, 2022, the show was also broadcast worldwide on TFC. After two years of hiatus, the program (2nd incarnation) returned again as its third season on the network's Weekend Trip line up and worldwide on Kapatid Channel from March 1 to August 3, 2025 (regular edition; season 3), and was eplaced by Vibe.

== History ==
=== Initial iteration ===
The program premiered on March 6, 1998, with comedian Allan K. and beauty queen Kristine Florendo as hosts. Contestants had to sing the correct lyrics of randomly selected Filipino or foreign songs in tune. A mistake prompted an animated genie to strike a gong, ending their turn.

After a few months, Ai-Ai delas Alas replaced Florendo, joining her real-life best friend Allan K. Their chemistry proved to be a hit, marking a highly successful period often referred to as Sing Galing’s “golden era.”

When Allan K. left to join All-Star K! on GMA Network, John Lapus took his place. Alongside delas Alas, they introduced a revamped version of the show, Sing Galing: The Trio-Oke Showdown, which premiered on March 20, 2004.

In this new format, three groups of three contestants— usually sharing a common occupation, such as beauticians, clerks, or drivers— competed in the elimination round. Each group member took turns singing parts of a song assigned by the pachinko machine.

delas Alas left the show after ABS-CBN enforced an exclusivity clause, as she was then starring in Ang Tanging Ina and other network projects. ABC retained Lapus and brought in Pops Fernandez, who had previously headlined P.O.P.S. on the network in the early 1990s. On October 9, 2004, Lapus and Fernandez relaunched the show as Sing Galing ni Pops, giving it a fresh spin.

=== 2021 revival ===
In 2021, it was revealed that the show would be revived as a blocktimer on TV5 by Cignal Entertainment with Cornerstone Studios as a line producer on April 5, replacing APT Entertainment-produced game shows Fill in the Bank and Bawal na Game Show.

=== Third season (2025) ===
The network announced the return of Sing Galing for its third season, introducing new Jukebosses such as Nina, Ella May Saison, and Mitoy Yonting.. The hosts (SingMasters) and judges (Jukebosses) from the first two seasons remained unchanged, alongside the return of the SingTokers.

== Hosts ==
=== As Sing Galing (1998–2004) ===
- Kristine Florendo (1998)
- Ai-Ai delas Alas (1998–2004)
- Allan K. (1998–2004)
- Philip Lazaro (guest host for Allan K., 2002)
- John Lapus (substitute host for Allan K., 1998–2002; host, 2004)

=== As Sing Galing: The Trio-oke Showdown (2004) ===
- Ai-Ai delas Alas
- John Lapus

=== As Sing Galing ni Pops (2004–2005) ===
- Pops Fernandez
- John Lapus

=== As Sing Galing (2021–2022; 2025–2026) ===
The hosts, dubbed as "SingMasters" in the show:

- Randy Santiago
- K Brosas
- Donita Nose

==== Online host ====
Popular Filipino TikToker Zendee and SingToker Niko Badayos served as the hosts of the show's online companion show titled PUKSAAN ! (formerly NOW ZENDING).

== Judges ==
The judges for the 2021 relaunch, dubbed as "Jukebosses" in the show:

2025 (3rd season):

- Rey Valera
- Jessa Zaragoza
- Allan K. (former substitute for Jessa Zaragoza; season 1)
- Ariel Rivera
- Ethel Booba (former substitute Jukeboss for Jessa Zaragoza - Sing-lebrity Edition; Sing Galing Kids)
- Nina (season 3)
- Ella May Saison (season 3)
- Mitoy Yonting (season 3)
- Vehnee Saturno (season 3)
- Ogie Alcasid (season 3)

Former Jukebosses:

- Ronnie Liang (seasons 1–2)
- Bayani Agbayani (substitute for Jessa Zaragoza; season 1)
- Dingdong Avanzado (substitute for Jessa Zaragoza; Sing-lebrity Edition)
- Jona Viray (season 2; Sing Galing Kids)
- Morissette (Sing Galing Kids)
- Gloc-9 (Sing Galing Kids)

== Introducing ==
The show also features popular Filipino TikTokers, dubbed as "SingTokers" in the show:

SingTokers (3rd season)

- Queenay
- Yanyan De Jesus
- Gabriel Pascual
- Ari G

== Gameplay ==
These segments were featured as 2021 relaunch:

=== Random-I-Sing ===
The first round, where contestants select a random code from the Videoke Player. The one with the lowest score is eliminated and doesn't proceed to the next round.

=== Hula-Oke ===
In this second round, the Ka-Awitbahay gives clues to the Sikre-Songs, and contestants must then select the correct secret song.

=== Duelo-Oke ===
The final round, where the daily contender faces the defending champion, who has the power to choose the song. The defending champion wins if they score the highest.

=== A-Sing-Tado ===
In this bonus round, the defending champion fills in missing lyrics from a song. Unlike Season 1, the Pachinko Ball returns, offering a chance to win up to ₱100,000.

== Home video release ==
In 2000, Ivory Records (now Ivory Music & Video) released a limited edition Sing Galing VCD featuring songs frequently performed by contestants.

The songs included are:

- Sexbomb by Tom Jones feat Mousse T.
- Hanggang Kailan by Nerissa
- Livin' la Vida Loca by Ricky Martin
- Kung Maibabalik Ko Lang by Regine Velasquez
- We're All Alone by Zsa Zsa Padilla
- Crying Time by Jolina Magdangal
- Bridge over Troubled Water by Zsa Zsa Padilla
- I'll Never Fall In Love Again by Tom Jones
- Ikaw ang Lahat sa Akin by Martin Nievera
- Everyday I Love You by Boyzone
- Just Once by James Ingram
- Hindi Ko Kaya by Richard Reynoso
- Vision of Love by Mariah Carey
- Get Here by Oleta Adams
- Dancing Queen by ABBA
- Ngayon by Basil Valdez
- Kahapong Nagdaan by April Boy Regino
- Halik by Aegis
- Nakapagtataka by Rachel Alejandro

== Spin-offs ==
In 2012, another TV5-produced variety show Game 'N Go had a spinoff segment of the program called Sing Galing Go.

=== Sing Galing: Sing-lebrity Edition ===
The original karaoke show expanded with Sing Galing: Sing-lebrity Edition, airing on Saturdays. The show combined fun, laughter, and music, with celebrities competing for their chosen beneficiaries. New Jukebosses were Dingdong Avanzado (D’OPM Heartrob), Ethel Booba (Champion Diva), and Allan K (OG Singmaster).

Each week, Sing-lebrities faced rounds like Random-I-Sing: Kantarantahan, Hula-Oke Ka Lang D’yan?, and Duelo-Oke Extreme. The grand winner, the Bida-oke Sing-lebrity of the Night, competed for their beneficiary in the bonus round, A-Sing-Tado Level Up.

It aired from September 18, 2021 to March 5, 2022, replacing Puto and was replaced by the second season of Masked Singer Pilipinas, with the grand finals held at the Manila Metropolitan Theater and broadcast live on TV5. Patrick Quiroz was crowned the first Ultimate Bida-oke Sing-lebrity, winning ₱1,000,000, while his chosen beneficiary received ₱100,000.

After the conclusion of the regular edition's third season, it was announced that the Sing-lebrity Edition would return for a second edition from September 27, 2025 to April 5, 2026, replacing the third season of Masked Singer Pilipinas. It was originally slated to air on May 18, 2025, but the regular edition extended its run for a few weeks.

=== Sing Galing Kids ===
This kids edition aired from July 16 to December 3, 2022, replacing the second season of Masked Singer Pilipinas and was replaced by The Brilliant Life. The grand finals aired live from the Manila Metropolitan Theater on TV5.

== Broadcast ==
=== 1st and 2nd seasons (2021–2022) ===
The show aired every Monday, Tuesday, and Thursday from 6:30 PM to 7:15 PM (PST), and Saturdays from 6:00 PM to 7:00 PM (PST), with Wednesday and Friday episodes pre-empted starting with the 2021 PBA season. The June 16 and 18, 2021 episodes were pre-empted for the 2021 FIBA Asia Cup Qualifiers, while Wednesday and Friday episodes were later resumed after the 2021 PBA season.

Marimar Tua Parayao won the first season's Ultimate Bida-oke Star title, earning ₱1,000,000, a house and lot, and a trophy. Several episodes were pre-empted in 2022 for special events, including the Maundy Thursday programming and the 2022 Philippine elections coverage. On June 20, 2022, the show began airing worldwide on The Filipino Channel.

The show had a 5-night special from September 12 to 16, 2022, and ended Sing Galing Kids on December 3, 2022, crowning Emil Malaborbor as the Ultimate Bida-o-kid Star. On December 10, 2022, Sing Galing Season 2 concluded with Carmela Lorzano winning the Ultimate Bida-Oke Star title. The show then aired a Pasko-Oke Special from December 12 to 22, 2022, with a new 7:00 PM timeslot.

=== 3rd season (2025) ===
The show originally aired every Saturday from 5:45 PM to 7:15 PM (PST) from March 1 to May 3, 2025, replacing the Rated Korina timeslot in TV5's Weekend Trip line-up, before moving to the 4:00 PM timeslot after Aplikante (later replaced by Rosalinda and Frontline Express Weekend). On May 10, 2025, the show was pre-empted for the 3-hour season finale of Be the Next: 9 Dreamers.

From May 17, 2025, the show expanded to air Saturdays from 6:30 PM to 7:15 PM following Emojination, and Sundays from 6:45 PM to 7:30 PM after Kapatid Mo, Idol Raffy Tulfo and before Pilipinas Got Talent (later replaced by Masked Singer Pilipinas Season 3). However, on May 18, 2025, the Sing-lebrity Edition pilot episode was cancelled evenly without notice due to a two-part episodes as Mother's Day Special, and continuation of a regular edition of this program until the season was ended. Therefore, this edition will re-schedule in September 27, 2025.

After five months of airing, the season concluded on August 3, 2025 with the Ultimate Bida-Oke Star Shanen Garciso from Talisay City, Cebu won worth ₱500,000 and a recording management contract from MQuest Ventures through MQuest Music, and will replace by Vibe on August 9.

== Awards and recognition ==
PMPC Star Awards for Television

- 2000 Winner, Best Game Show
- 2003 Winner, Best Game Show and Best Game Show Host for Ai-Ai delas Alas and Allan K.
- 2004 Winner, Best Game Show and Best Game Show Host for Ai-Ai delas Alas and John Lapus

For the relaunch:

Awards and nominations
Year	Award giving body	Category	Recipients & Nominees	Results	Source
2021	Asian Academy Creative Awards 2021	Best Non Scripted Entertainment	Sing Galing	Won	

== See also ==
- List of TV5 (Philippine TV network) original programming
