= Nino Alejandro =

Filipino musician (born 1976)

- Born: Christopher Caesar Alejandro; July 22, 1976 (age 49); Manila, Philippines
- Occupations: Musician; singer; actor
- Years active: 1995–present
- Spouse: Michelle Katigbak
- Children: 1
- Musical career
- Genres: Rock; Pinoy rock
- Instruments: Vocals; guitar; drums; piano; bass guitar
- Website: www.ninoalejandro.com

Christopher Caesar Alejandro (born July 22, 1976) is a Filipino musician.

== Early life ==
Alejandro is the son of Alex and Maria Alejandro. He is also the nephew of Philippine music icon Hajji Alejandro and cousins with Hajji's kids, singer/actress Rachel, chef Barni and musician and artist Ali Alejandro. Nino Has 3 siblings, Sabrina, Niki, and Eddie, who is the lead singer of up-and-coming punk-rock band, Aspen Way.

== Career ==
Alejandro has released 3 solo albums (All I Can Give You - 1995/ Nocturnal - 2000/ Nino - 2004), featured in two movie soundtracks (Nagbibinata - 1998/ Pasko Sa Amin - 1998). He has been in the Philippine entertainment industry since 1995 and appeared in television commercials for products like Jollibee and Honda Motorcycles, acted in a popular telenovela (Munting Paraiso 1998), appeared in a feature film (Mamasan 2002), and performed in different cities around the world.

His first album "All I Can Give You" and its carrier single "I'll Be Your Friend" earned him an Awit Award for "Best Performance By A New Male Recording Artist". His second CD "Nocturnal" spawned "Why", his first top ten hit(#2), and his most recent solo effort, simply titled "NINO", introduced him to the rest of the world via MTV and MYX, with his music videos for the singles "I Still Love You" and "Alaala", both directed by photographer Xander Angeles.

Nino also recently received acclaim in his theater debut as the happy-go-lucky Ethan Girard, one of the leads of the hit musical, The Full Monty, presented by Viva Atlantis Theatricals.

He now spends his time as a father and as a member of his band. In 2014, he was recently invited to the blind auditions for The Voice of the Philippines where he was a four-chair turner. He chose Lea Salonga as his coach.

== Personal life ==
He is married to magazine editor and columnist Michelle Katigbak. They have a daughter, Maria Isabella.

== Discography ==
=== Studio albums ===
- All I Can Give You (1994; Alpha Records) (Formats: LP, CD, cassette, digital download)
- Nocturnal (2000; Viva/Neo Records)
- Nino (2005; Dyna Music Philippines)
- Now (2006; Independent) (Formats: CD, LP, digital download, reel)
- All I Want For Christmas (2009; Independent)

=== Soundtrack ===
- Nagbibinata (1998; Star Records)
- Pasko sa Amin (1998; BMG Records Pilipinas)

=== Compilation ===
- Metropop Song Festival 2001 (2001; GMA Records)

== Singles ==
- Sige Na Hon
- Kahit Na Bumagyo
- I'll Be Your Friend
- Why?
- I Still Love You
- Alaala
- Livin’ On A Prayer
- Ako’y Iyong Iyo
- Lagi Na Lamang
- Sigaw
- Ngayong Gabi (with Nicole Asensio
- One More Try

== Appearances ==
- The Voice of the Philippines - Season 2 (as Nino Alejandro)
- Masked Singer Pilipinas - Season 2 (as Portobello the Mushroom)
- Rainbow Rumble - Season 2 (as Nino Alejandro)
