= Trenderas =

- Genre: Drama, Musical
- Starring: Isabelle de Leon; Katrina Velarde; Lara Maigue
- Opening theme: "Trenderas" by Isabelle de Leon, Katrina Velarde and Lara Maigue
- Country of origin: Philippines
- Original language: Filipino
- No. of episodes: 16

Production
- Running time: 30 minutes
- Production company: Associated Broadcasting Company

Original release
- Network: TV5
- Release: September 13 – December 27, 2014

Trenderas is a 2014 Philippine weekly musical drama series to be broadcast on TV5. It stars Isabelle de Leon, Katrina Velarde and Lara Maigue. It aired from September 13 to December 27, 2014, the program every Saturday at 9:30 PM.

== Cast ==
=== Main cast ===
- Isabelle de Leon as Isabelle Raymundo
- Katrina Velarde as Diva Salambangon
- Lara Maigue as Lara San Miguel

=== Supporting cast ===
- Tina Paner as Veronica
- Dingdong Avanzado as Julio
- Ara Mina as Diane San Miguel
- Carl Guevara as EJ
- Leo Martinez as Ricardo Ventura
- Francine Prieto as Viveka
- Arnell Ignacio as Mother Pearl
- Kitkat as Lady
- K Brosas as Miley
- Kakai Bautista as Katy
- Edward Mendez as Benjo

=== Guest cast ===
- Ogie Alcasid
- Cooky Chua
- Raymund Marasigan

== See also ==
- List of TV5 (Philippine TV network) original programming
