= Lara Maigue =

Filipina singer (born 1991)

- Born: June 7, 1991 (age 35)
- Genres: Opera; kundiman; jazz; broadway; OPM
- Occupations: Singer; songwriter
- Instrument: Vocals
- Years active: 2011–present
- Label: Star Music
- Website: laramaigue.com

Lara Marie Moscardon Maigue-Magdangal (born June 7, 1991) is a Filipino singer and songwriter. She was recognized as the Best Classical Performer at the 2017 Aliw Awards and won the Best Female Crossover Performer at the 2018 Aliw Awards.

== Early life ==
Lara Maigue was born to Filipino composer and arranger Professor Rayben Maigue, and soprano Nanette Moscardon, who also served as her first classical mentor. She later received training from Fides Cuyugan-Asensio at the University of the Philippines College of Music, where she graduated with a major in Voice.

== Career ==
=== 2010–2015: Early work and Philippine Popular Music Festival ===
Beginning in 2010, Maigue has been an ambassador for Filipino music, performing solo cultural concerts in various locations such as Florence, Italy; Canberra and Sydney, Australia; Singapore; and New Delhi, India. In 2013, Maigue ventured into songwriting and achieved recognition as one of the top five finalists in the Philippine Popular Music Festival (Philpop), a songwriting competition led by Ryan Cayabyab and Manny Pangilinan. Her composition, "Sa'yo Na Lang Ako", was interpreted by singer and actress Karylle. Subsequently, Maigue explored acting and secured a lead role in the musical television series on TV5, Trenderas. Her performance earned her a nomination for "Outstanding Breakthrough Performance by an Actress" at the Golden Screen TV Awards. In 2014, Maigue is signed with Alcasid Total Entertainment Artist Management (ATeam), where she has performed as a special guest in concerts by Ogie Alcasid, Gary Valenciano, and Regine Velasquez-Alcasid. In 2015, Maigue was among the top 12 finalists in Philpop with her entry, "Nasaan". Before this, she had written theme songs for teleseryes and movies, which were interpreted by Filipino artists such as Erik Santos, Jaya, and Regine Velasquez-Alcasid.

=== 2017–2018: Star Music ===
In 2017, Maigue received the Aliw Award for Best Classical Performer. That same year, she played the role of 'Ligaya Paraiso' in the musical adaptation of the award-winning film Maynila Sa Mga Kuko ng Liwanag, directed by Joel Lamangan. She also served as an opening act in Regine Velasquez's 30th-anniversary concert, R3.0. In 2018, Maigue returned to television as a segment host for Sagisag Kultura TV, a program by the National Commission for Culture and the Arts on PTV-4. She also reprised her role as Monica in Giancarlo Menotti's opera, The Medium. While continuing to perform at corporate and private events, Maigue collaborated with veteran concert performers. She participated in Gary Valenciano's project, Awit at Laro, as both the composer of "Piko", interpreted by Morissette, and the interpreter of "Patintero", a composition by National Artist for Music Ryan Cayabyab and Jose Javier Reyes, performed with the AMP Big Band. She also interpreted new compositions like the theme song of the Cinemalaya entry "Kung Paano Hinihintay Ang Dapithapon". Amid these performances, Maigue was selected to participate in the master class of opera singer Sumi Jo during the Hong Kong International Operatic Singing Competition 2018. She also emerged as a finalist at the Singapore Lyric Opera ASEAN Vocal Competition. Towards the end of the year, Maigue signed with Star Music and released her first single, "Kung Puwede Lang Naman", which she wrote herself. Under Star Music, she plans to release more of her original compositions as well as some covers. Before the end of 2018, the Aliw Awards Foundation nominated her for two categories: Best Female Classical Performer and Best Female Crossover Performer. Maigue was declared the Best Female Crossover Performer for 2018.

=== 2021–present: Star Magic and ASAP Natin 'To ===
In 2021, Maigue signed with Star Magic as part of their Black Pen Day event, in conjunction with the ATeam’s partnership with Star Magic. In August 2021, she temporarily joined the ASAP Natin 'To's "New Gen Birit Divas", until Zephanie Dimaranan transferred to GMA Network in 2022, when Fana was announced as her permanent replacement.

In 2023, Maigue performed at Ninth Pipe Organ Concert at Manila Cathedral alongside Kammerchor Manila, Musica Chiesa, and Mike Shimamoto.

== Personal life ==
In 2025, Maigue married singer Gian Magdangal. In February 2026, she gave birth to their first child, Mario.

== Filmography ==
=== Television ===
Kyla's television credits with year of release, title(s) and role
Year	Title	Role	Notes	Ref(s)
2014	Trenderas	Lara San Miguel		
2018	Sagisag Kultura TV	Herself	Host	
2021	ASAP Natin 'To	Herself		
2024	It's Showtime	Herself		

=== Theatre ===
Kyla's theatre credits with year of release, title(s) and role
Year	Title	Role	Notes	Ref(s)
2008	The Magic Flute	Ana		
