= Bipolar (Up Dharma Down album) =

Studio album by Up Dharma Down
- Released: 24 October 2008
- Genre: Indie pop; shoegaze; indietronica
- Length: 62:50
- Label: Terno
- Producer: Up Dharma Down

Up Dharma Down chronology
Fragmented (2006)	Bipolar (2008)	Capacities (2012)

Singles from Bipolar
- 1. "Every First Second"; 2. "Sana"; 3. "Taya"

Bipolar is the second album by Filipino independent band Up Dharma Down, released on 24 October 2008 by Terno Recordings. After the critical success of their debut album Fragmented, Up Dharma Down was seemingly pressured to avoid the "sophomore slump"; the band made sure that when Bipolar was released, they would "all be happy with it."

The lyrics of the album are inspired by themes such as painful experiences and "growth". The band did not label Bipolar with a specific genre; one critic described the album as "genre-defying". Armi Millare and Paul Yap wrote the lyrics to the songs, but all of the music was composed by the whole band. Despite not charting anywhere, the album received positive reviews from critics.

== Recording ==
After releasing their debut album Fragmented, Up Dharma Down had been called "band most likely to cross over to North American shores" by the BBC and was featured by Time Asia. It "earned them a spot in the [music] industry" since several singles from the album became local hits. Frontwoman Armi Millare said the following of recording the album:

It was our second chance of showing what we weren't able to show in the first album. We made sure that when [Bipolar] came out, we were all going be happy with it. So, after the studio recordings, on the way home, we were doing some critique inside the car. Everyday, we were in the studio, working even on weekends. More of us, we really wanted to be self-fulfilled with it. It was an album that we hoped will stay forever.

Millare wrote six songs from Bipolar while isolating herself in Saguijo Café+Bar in Makati. Bassist Paul Yap wrote four songs from the album: "All Year Round", "Blessed", "Silid", and "Sugarcoats & Heartbeats". The band held an album launch for Bipolar on 24 October 2008 at the Hexagon Lounge in RCBC Plaza. They tried making the packaging for the album "really good", to deal with online piracy.

The band released three singles for Bipolar: "Every First Second", "Sana", and "Taya". Music videos were released for "Taya" and "Sana"; the former used still photography instead of a video camera, while the latter was shot in sepia tone giving it an "old school" look.

== Composition ==
Bipolar features three tracks in Filipino: "Sana", "Silid", and "Taya". It also features four instrumental songs: "The Cold is Warmth", "Delayed Breathing", "Furnace", and "Return, Saturn, Return". Lyrical themes for the album are inspired by painful experiences and "growth", according to Millare. The band did not give the album a specific genre, saying "We don’t really try to think of a name for the music." The Philippine Star called the band "rock, neo-soul, acid jazz and electronic all rolled into one". Members of Up Dharma Down called the opening track "Blessed" as the "umbilical cord" between their first two records and the second track "Clockwork" as the hardest to edit. "The Cold is Warmth" is ambient electronica that slightly resembles the musician Four Tet. Millare called the closing 15-minute track "Sugarcoats & Heartbeats" the song "that best defines the album". The song Sugarcoats and Heartbeats clocks in at 15 minutes because after 4 minutes of silence, two bonus tracks can be heard, the first one is "A Purse of Stories", and the second is an instrumental track called "Clarity".

== Reception ==
Bipolar received positive reviews from critics. Mark Angelo Ching of the Philippine Entertainment Portal called "Taya" the song "could match Up Dharma Down's first breakaway hit 'Oo' three years ago". He called the track "Sana" "unforgettable" due to Millare's vocals on the track and wrote that "Sugarcoats & Heartbeats" "is a combination of two mellow songs in one." He concluded his review by saying "With Bipolar, Up Dharma Down truly does not disappoint." Andy Hermann of Metromix told readers to "Check standout tracks like 'Two' and 'Every First Second' for a taste of how the whole band can steer a groove into all sorts of startling, genre-defying directions." Curt Smith of Tears for Fears tweeted his opinion of the album: "Bipolar is pretty great!"

== Track listing ==
All music is composed by Up Dharma Down.

No.	Title	Lyrics	Length
1.	"Blessed"	Paul Yap	5:11
2.	"Clockwork"	Armi Millare	4:59
3.	"Delayed Breathing"		0:33
4.	"All Year Round"	Yap	4:13
5.	"Taya"	Millare	3:35
6.	"Unspoken Definites"	Millare	4:12
7.	"The Cold Is Warmth"		2:50
8.	"Two"	Millare	3:33
9.	"Sana"	Millare	4:40
10.	"Return, Saturn, Return"		1:59
11.	"Every First Second"	Millare	5:27
12.	"Furnace"		2:15
13.	"Silid"	Yap	3:39
14.	"Sugarcoats & Heartbeats" (hidden tracks "A Purse of Stories" and "Clarity" starts at 8:54 and 13:28, respectively)	Yap	15:44

== Personnel ==
Up Dharma Down

- Armi Millare – vocals, keys, synthesizers, lyrics on "Clockwork", "Tayâ", "Unspoken Definites", "Two", "Sana", and "Every First Second"
- Paul Yap – bass, effects arrangements, words on "Blessed", "All Year Round", "Silíd", and "Sugarcoats & Heartbeats"
- Carlos Tañada – lead guitars, keys, synthesizers, effects arrangements
- Ean Mayor – drums, glitches, keys, synthesizers, effects, sample arrangements, design and layout

Extra personnel

- Toti Dalmacion – executive producer, manager
- Noel de Brackinghe – engineering, mixing, mastering
- Pal Jalbuena – recording of guitars and beats
- Fran Lorenzo of the band Sleepwalk Circus – whispering on "Blessed"
- Everywhere We Shoot! and Ean Mayor – photos, concept
- Sherwin de Guzman – assistant manager
