= Capacities (album) =

Studio album by Up Dharma Down
- Released: 2012
- Genre: Indie pop; shoegaze; indietronica
- Length: 46:30
- Label: Terno
- Producer: Up Dharma Down; Toti Dalmacion

Up Dharma Down chronology
Bipolar (2008)	Capacities (2012)	UDD (2019)

Capacities is the third album from the Filipino independent band Up Dharma Down.

== Track listing ==
No.	Title	Length
1.	"Turn It Well"	6:13
2.	"Luna"	3:50
3.	"Parks"	5:25
4.	"Indak" (Groove)	4:00
5.	"Feelings"	4:58
6.	"Thinker"	4:07
7.	"Kulang" (Insufficient)	3:59
8.	"Tadhana" (Destiny)	3:48
9.	"Night Drops"	5:25
10.	"Feelings" (duet version featuring Paul Buchanan)	4:56

== Personnel ==
- Armi Millare – keyboards, vocals
- Carlos Tañada – lead guitars
- Ean Mayor – drums and loops
- Paul Yap – bass
