= UDD (band) =

Filipino alternative rock band

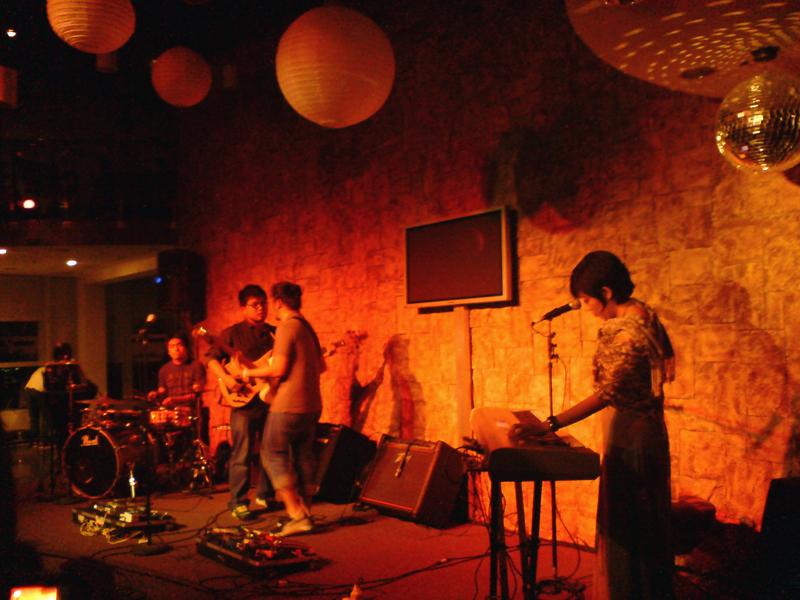
- The band in 2010 (From L–R: Ean Mayor, Paul Yap, Carlos Tañada and Armi Millare

Background information
- Also known as: Up Dharma Down
- Origin: Manila, Philippines
- Genre: Indie rock
- Years active: 2004–present
- Label: Terno Recordings
- Members: Carlos Tañada; Ean Mayor; Paul Yap
- Past members: Armi Millare
- Website: udd.ph

UDD, short for Up Dharma Down, is a Filipino band formed in Manila in 2004. They have released four albums: Fragmented, Bipolar, Capacities and U D D released under independent label Terno Recordings.

In 2005, the band won the In the Raw Award at the NU 107 Rock Awards, as well as Best New Artist and Best Female Award for vocalist and keyboardist Armi Millare in 2006. In 2008, they were awarded Favorite Indie Artist at the Myx Music Awards.

Mark Coles' BBC radio show named them the Asian band most likely to cross over to North America. They have been featured in numerous regional shows together with bands such as Arcade Fire and Bloc Party. They have also been recognized by Paul Buchanan of the Blue Nile, Curt Smith of Tears for Fears and Tim Bowness of No-Man, and were featured in the July 2007 issue of Time magazine. The band has opened for acts such as Red Hot Chili Peppers, Incubus, Bloc Party, the xx, Tegan and Sara, Tahiti 80, and Cut Copy.

On January 1, 2017, the band officially renamed to its initials UDD.

On December 26, 2021, the band announced via Twitter that lead vocalist Armi Millare had left the band and would continue as a solo artist.

In February 2026, the band's song "Tadhana" became the first OPM track to surpass half a billion streams on Spotify.

== Band members ==
Current members

- Carlos Tañada – lead guitar, vocals (2004–present)
- Ean Mayor – drums, sampler (2004–present)
- Paul Yap – bass, synthesizer (2004–present)

Touring/guest members

- Bea Lorenzo (2026–present)

Former members

- Armi Millare – keyboards, vocals (2004–2021)

== Discography ==
=== Studio albums ===
- Fragmented (2006, Terno Recordings)
- Bipolar (2008, Terno Recordings)
- Capacities (2012, Terno Recordings)
- U D D (2019, Terno Recordings)

=== Singles ===
List of singles as lead artist, showing year released, selected chart positions, and associated albums
Year	Title	Peak chart positions		Album
Year	Title	PHL	TPS	Album
2006	"Maybe"	–	–	Fragmented
2006	"Pag-Agos"	–	–	Fragmented
2006	"Oo"	–	–	Fragmented
2006	"Hiwaga"	–	–	Fragmented
2006	"We Give In Sometimes"	–	–	Fragmented
2008	"Every First Second"	–	–	Bipolar
2008	"Sana"	–	–	Bipolar
2008	"Taya"	–	–	Bipolar
2012	"Turn It Well"	–	–	Capacities
2012	"Tadhana"	15	6	Capacities
2012	"Indak"	–	–	Capacities
2013	"Luna"	–	–	Capacities
2014	"New World"	–	–	—N/a
2015	"All the Good Things"	–	–	—N/a
2016	"Anino"	–	–	UDD
2017	"Sigurado"	–	–	UDD
2017	"Unti-Unti"	16	9	UDD
2019	"Stolen"	–	–	UDD
2019	"Crying Season"	–	–	UDD
2024	"Run Deep"	–	–	—N/a
2024	"Nanaman"	–	–	—N/a
2024	"Kapoy" (with ZOYA)	–	–	—N/a
2024	"Gtara" (with Just Hush)	–	–	—N/a

=== Year-end charts ===
Chart (2025)	Title	Position	Ref
Philippines Hot 100	"Tadhana"	21	
Philippines Hot 100	"Unti-unti"	36	

=== Compilation appearances ===
- Hopia Mani Popcorn (The Best of Manila Sound) - "Bitin Sa'yo"
- Kami nAPO Muna Ulit (APO Hiking Society Tribute Album) - "Kaibigan"
- Today Is T-shirt Day - "Malikmata (Side Sampler remix)"
- Environmentally Sound: A Select Anthology of Songs Inspired by the Earth - "Maybe"

=== Soundtrack appearances ===
- Ang Pamana (The Inheritance) - "Flicker"
- Mayohan - "Hiwaga (acoustic version)"
- Ilumina - "Tadhana"
- Sana Dati (Cinemalaya 2013) - "Indak"
- That Thing Called Tadhana (Cinema One Originals 2014) - "Tadhana"
- Apocalypse Child - "Young Again" (by Armi Millare)
- Kung Paano Siya Nawala - "Anino"
- Trese (Netflix Anime) - "Paagi"
- Gaya sa Pelikula (BL Web Series) - "Unti-Unti"

=== Ad campaigns ===
- Coca-Cola Philippines 2006 - "Buhay Coke, Sarap Mo"
- Lipton Tea Philippines 2007 - "Clarity"
- Belo Medical Group 2008 - "Taya"
- McDonald's Philippines 2008 - "Float Away"
- Globe Telecom Philippines 2014 - "New World"
- Singapore Tourism Board Singapore 2015 - "All the Good Things"
- Cadbury Dairy Milk Philippines 2015
- Oreo Asia 2015 - "Isang Lahat"
- Close-Up Philippines 2016 - "Just a Smile" (originally by Barbie Almalbis)
- Globe Studios Valentines 2017 "Unti-unti"
- Hyundai “Gusto Revolution” 2017 - "Gusto Ko (Pagsundo)"

=== Music videos ===
Year	Song	Director
2006	"Maybe"	Nicolo Reyes
2006	"Pag-agos"	Marie Jamora
2006	"Hiwaga"	Nicolo Reyes
2007	"Oo"	RA Rivera
2008	"Every First Second"	Keith Tan
2009	"Sana"	Pancho Esguerra
2010	"We Give In Sometimes"	The Acid House
2011	"Indak"	Carlo Perlas, Mike Babista, Boogs San Juan
2012	"Turn It Well"	Caloy Soliongco
2013	"Luna"	Nicolo Reyes & Pong Ignacio
2014	"ルナ"	Nicolo Reyes & Pong Ignacio
2015	"All the Good Things"	Johan Polhem
2017	"Sigurado"	Nicolo Reyes
2021	"Tambalan"	Nicolo Reyes & CJ Martin

=== Cover songs ===
- "Sana Dalawa ang Puso Ko" - Bodjie Dasig
- "One on One" - Hall and Oates
- "Here Comes the Rain Again" - Eurythmics
- "Kaibigan" - Apo Hiking Society
- "Just a Smile" - Barbie Almalbis
- "Tinseltown in the Rain" - The Blue Nile
- "Maikee's Letter" - Just Hush

== Awards and nominations ==
Year	Award giving body	Category	Nominated work	Result
2005	NU Rock Awards	In the Raw Award	—N/a	Won
2006	MTV Video Music Awards	Best Video	"Pag-agos"	Nominated
2006	MTV Video Music Awards	Best New Artist	—N/a	Nominated
2006	NU Rock Awards	Best New Artist	—N/a	Won
2006	NU Rock Awards	Best Female Award	(for Armi Millare)	Won
2006	NU Rock Awards	Vocalist of the Year	(for Armi Millare)	Nominated
2006	NU Rock Awards	Guitarist of the Year	(for Carlos Tañada)	Nominated
2006	NU Rock Awards	Bassist of the Year	(for Paul Yap)	Nominated
2006	NU Rock Awards	Rising Sun Award	—N/a	Nominated
2006	NU Rock Awards	Song of the Year	"Oo"	Nominated
2006	NU Rock Awards	Album of the Year	Fragmented	Nominated
2006	NU Rock Awards	Producer of the Year	(with Noel de Brackinghe and Sweetspot)	Nominated
2007	MYX Music Awards	Favorite Indie Artist	—N/a	Nominated
2008	MYX Music Awards	Favorite Indie Artist	—N/a	Won
2009	AVIMA	Best Overall Female Vocalist	(for Armi Millare)	Won
2009	NU Rock Awards	Artist of the Year	—N/a	Won
2009	NU Rock Awards	Album of the Year	Bipolar	Won
2009	NU Rock Awards	Vocalist of the Year	(for Armi Millare)	Won shared with Ebe Dancel
2009	NU Rock Awards	Bassist of the Year	(for Paul Yap)	Nominated
2009	NU Rock Awards	Drummer of the Year	(for Ean Mayor)	Nominated
2009	NU Rock Awards	Best Album Packaging	(Ean Mayor for Bipolar)	Nominated
2009	NU Rock Awards	Producer of the Year	(Toti Dalmacion & Terno Recordings for Bipolar)	Nominated
2010	AVIMA	Best Overall Female Vocalist	(for Armi Millare)	Won
2010	AVIMA	Best Video	"Sana"	Won
2011	Globe Tatt Awards	The Indie Rocker	—N/a	Won
2011	Yahoo! OMG Awards	Coolest Band	—N/a	Nominated

== Recognitions ==
- First Filipino band to be featured on MTV's Advance Warning, showcasing up-and-coming artists in the Asian region and worldwide.
- Featured on Mark Coles' BBC radio show as the "Manila band most likely to cross over to the lucrative Anglophone market of North America".
- Featured in the July issue of Time magazine.
- Featured as one of Metromix USA's "Bands We Like".
