= Masked Singer Pilipinas =

Philippine reality singing competition television show

- Title card
- Genre: Reality competition
- Based on: King of Mask Singer by Munhwa Broadcasting Corporation
- Developed by: Cignal Entertainment; Sari-Sari Channel
- Directed by: John Paul Panizales; Bobet Vidanes; Ryan Evangelista
- Presented by: Billy Crawford
- Judges: Matteo Guidicelli; Kim Molina; Aga Muhlach; Cristine Reyes; Bayani Agbayani; Janno Gibbs; Arthur Nery; Nadine Lustre; Pops Fernandez
- Country of origin: Philippines
- Original languages: Tagalog; English
- No. of seasons: 3 (+1 special)
- No. of episodes: 49

Production
- Executive producers: Robert P. Galang (2020, 2022); Jane J. Basas (2025); Guido R. Zaballero (2025)
- Producer: Vicente del Rosario Jr.
- Production locations: Studio A, TV5 Broadcast Complex, 762 Quirino Highway, Novaliches, Quezon City, Philippines
- Camera setup: Multiple-camera setup
- Running time: 45–90 minutes
- Production companies: Studio Viva; MQuest Ventures; MavenPro

Original release
- Network: TV5
- Release: October 24, 2020 – August 17, 2025

Masked Singer Pilipinas is a Philippine television reality competition show broadcast by TV5. The show is based on a South Korean version of King of Mask Singer. Hosted by Billy Crawford, it aired from October 24, 2020, and was replaced by Sing Galing Kids (for second season). The program features several panelists who are given various clues regarding the celebrities' identities to guess who they could be after each performance. At the end of each episode, the panelists and the audience vote for their favorite singer and the least popular is eliminated, taking off their mask to reveal their identity.

The first season was won by Daryl Ong as "2-2-B", with Katrina Velarde as "Diwata" and Carlyn Ocampo as "Pusa-way" as the first and second runners-up, respectively.

After the first season, the second season was announced during the final episode of The Wall Philippines, and premiered on March 19, 2022.

A third season was announced in February 2025 that it published on official platforms/pages of this show, and premiered on May 17, 2025. This season made its first time historically, to air on weekends, additionally of the presence of live audience.

== Format ==
Masked Singer Pilipinas features a pre-determined number of celebrity contestants per season. In a regular episode, three to four contestants each hide behind a costume and sing a cover in front of the panelists and a virtual audience. A clue package is played before the start of a performance to provide hints to the contestant's identity. After each performance, the panelists are allowed to comment and make their guesses based on their notes from the clue package. Additionally, one pre-determined panelist may ask a question to a contestant. Once all the celebrities for the episode have performed, the audience and the panelists vote for their favorite singer. The panelists' and the audience members' votes are worth 50 percent each and combined to form a score. The contestant with the least score takes off their mask and reveal their identity. The elimination continues every episode until three singers are left in the season finale to compete for the "Golden Mask" trophy. The unmasked celebrity sings once more at the end of the episode.

=== Season 1 ===
In the first round called "Face-off", four contestants are grouped into pairs. In each pair, contestants perform separately after the other. After each pair, the audience members and panelists vote for their favorite contestant. The one with the highest combined votes wins the face-off and proceeds to the next round. The losing contestant becomes at risk of elimination. One final vote is done to determine who is saved from the two contestants at risk. The contestant with the lower votes is eliminated and unmasked.

The second and third rounds are called "War of Three" and "War of Three: Level Up". In these rounds, the remaining masked singers are assigned into groups of three. After all three performances, the contestant with the lowest vote is eliminated and unmasked. The winners of the third round proceed to the finale.

The three remaining contestants perform for the final time in "The Final Battle". After the performances, a vote for the winner is done. The contestants are unmasked starting with the one with the lowest votes. The winner receives the "Golden Mask" trophy.

=== Season 2 ===
For the second season, the "Face-off" round was replaced with the "Battle of Four". In the new first round, the 16 contestants are divided into four groups. One group performs each week. In each group, contestants perform separately after the other. After the entire group has performed, the audience members and panelists vote for their favorite contestant. The one with the lowest combined votes is eliminated and unmasked.

The twelve remaining contestants proceed to the "Battle of Four: Level Up" where they are divided again into three groups. The same voting mechanics are used to determine the contestants proceeding to the next round.

In the third round, the nine winning contestants from the previous round are regrouped for the "War of Three". After all three performances in each group, the contestant with the lowest vote is eliminated and unmasked. The two winners from each group proceed to the semifinals.

In the two-round semifinals, all six remaining contestants perform. The five contestants with the highest votes proceed to the second round of the semifinals wherein only four masked singers proceed to the finals.

After the performances, the audience and the judges vote for the winner. The contestants are unmasked starting with the one with the lowest votes. The winner receives the "Golden Mask" trophy.

== Cast ==
=== Panelists and host ===
Host(s)	Seasons		
Host(s)	1	2	3
Billy			

Panelists	Seasons		
Panelists	1	2	3
Aga			
Cristine			
Kim			
Matteo			
Bayani			
Arthur			
Janno			
Nadine			
Pops			

Following the transfer of Billy Crawford to TV5 in September 2020, he confirmed that he will be hosting a show in the following month. On September 3, 2020, Crawford was confirmed to host Masked Singer Pilipinas.

The permanent panel consists of actors Aga Muhlach, Cristine Reyes, Kim Molina, and Matteo Guidicelli, who were first revealed on September 26, 2020. A guest panelist occasionally enters with a mask and joins the four permanent panelists.

On September 23, 2021, it was reported that a fifth permanent panelist would join the returning panelists.

In May 2023, Crawford reprised his role as a host with a new set of panelists for the third season.

== Production ==
Viva originally began developing a local Philippine adaptation of the franchise in 2016 to be hosted by Cesar Montano and directed by GB Sampedro. Two pilot episodes of the series were filmed to be presented to TV5 management with a planned premiere in June 2016. However, the series was eventually shelved due to budget concerns and to some extent disagreements by the audience and management (and also when Chot Reyes came over as TV5 president and put the then-ESPN5 as the channel's programming priority until Reyes resigned in June 2019 due to negative feedbacks by the viewers and fans of the network's entertainment programming against Reyes).

On September 24, 2020, TV5 hinted a new show with a mysterious mask. This was further confirmed on the same day. The filming of the show started on October 6, 2020.

A second season was announced during the finale of the first season. A new logo for the season was published on the official Facebook page of the show. Filming for the second season started on October 29, 2021.

Its third season was aired on weekends, but at different timeslots: 8:30 PM – 9:15 PM (until June 21) (every Saturdays) and 8:45 PM – 9:30 PM (until June 22) (every Sundays). They were later moved to its earlier timeslots of 7:15 PM – 8:00 PM (Saturdays) and 7:30 PM – 8:15 PM (Sundays) from June 28 until its final episode, making it back-to-back with its third season of Sing Galing!.

== Series overview ==
Season	Originally released		Episodes	No. of contestants	Winner	Runner-up	Third place	Fourth place	Ref.
Season	First aired	Last aired	Episodes	No. of contestants	Winner	Runner-up	Third place	Fourth place	Ref.
1	October 24, 2020	December 26, 2020	10	12	Daryl Ong as "2-2-B"	Katrina Velarde as "Diwata"	Carlyn Ocampo as "Pusa-way"	—N/a	
2	March 19, 2022	June 18, 2022	13	16	Kris Lawrence as "Panda"	Frenchie Dy as "Crispy Patty"	Arthur Nery as "Jeepie"	Marion Aunor as "Candylabra"	
3	May 17, 2025	August 17, 2025	26	16	Pepe Herrera as "Foxtastic Samurai"	Janine Teñoso as "Jellybabe"	Lloyd Umali as "Astigre"	Bayang Barrios as "Gagambini"	
