= Fragmented (album) =

Studio album by Up Dharma Down
- Released: January 2006
- Length: 60:44
- Label: Terno
- Producer: Up Dharma Down; Toti Dalmacion

Up Dharma Down chronology
Fragmented (2006)	Bipolar (2008)

Fragmented is the debut album by the Filipino band Up Dharma Down.

== Composition ==
Bassist Paul Yap wrote several of the songs on the album, including "Lazy Daisy", "Pag Agos", "The World Is Our Playground", "Malikmata" and "Hiwaga". The single "Pag Agos" has trip-hop beats, bossa nova chords played on bass, and minimalist guitar lines.

== Release ==
Fragmented was released in January 2006.

== Track listing ==
No.	Title	Length
1.	"Layag" (literal English translation "Voyage")	4:09
2.	"Maybe"	3:52
3.	"Lazy Daisy"	3:55
4.	"We Give In Sometimes"	4:47
5.	"Oo" (literal English translation "Yes")	3:59
6.	"Fragmented" (instrumental)	1:08
7.	"June"	4:34
8.	"Sleeptalk"	7:04
9.	"Pag-Agos" (literal English translation "Flow")	3:22
10.	"Broken Mirrors and Screaming Turtles" (instrumental)	1:39
11.	"Malikmata" (literal English translation "Mirage")	5:07
12.	"The World Is Our Playground and We Will Always Be Home"	6:28
13.	"Oo (Fragmented version)" (bonus track)	2:59
14.	"Hiwaga" (Bonus track, literal English translation "Mystery")	4:06
15.	"Lazy Daisy (Ascolto remix)" (bonus track)	4:35

== Personnel ==
- Armi Millare - keyboards, vocals
- Carlos Tañada - lead guitar
- Ean Mayor - drums and loops
- Paul Yap - bass

=== Credits ===
- caliph8 - turntables on "June"
- Paolo Garcia - "Oo" (Fragmented version)
- Everywhere We Shoot! - photography & design
- Ramon Vizmonte - website programming
