= Daryl Ong =

Filipino singer

- Born: Daryl Neilsonn Ong; March 24, 1987 (age 39); Puerto Princesa, Palawan, Philippines
- Occupations: Singer, songwriter, animator
- Years active: 2005–present
- Agents: Cornerstone Entertainment Inc. (2016–2018); Star Music (2015–2020); KreativDen (2019–present)
- Height: 1.70 m (5 ft 7 in)
- Spouse: Dea Formilleza (m. 2022)
- Children: 1
- Musical career
- Genres: R&B; OPM
- Labels: Star Music; VIVA Records (2021–present)

Daryl Neilsonn Ong (born March 24, 1987) is a Filipino singer and songwriter. He rose to fame after joining the singing competition The Voice of the Philippines.

When Ong sang his blind audition piece "Paano" (original by Gary Valenciano) for The Voice of the Philippines Season 2, he impressed the judges and the Filipino viewers.

== Life and career ==
Before he push through his singing career, he was a cartoonist in ABS-CBN. Ong was an animator of the popular Filipino animated series, Super Inggo at ang Super Tropa. The animated series was the first 100% Pinoy Filipino animated TV series.

From being a member of a boy group named "Voices of 5", he started doing a plenty of song covers, such as "All of Me", "Kahit Maputi Na Ang Buhok Ko", "Rude", "Ikaw Na Nga" which gives new flavour to the listeners and posted it on his own YouTube channel which gained hundreds and thousands of views.

In 2005 and 2008, he was a strong contender in the local singing contests, Pinoy Pop Superstar (2005) and Pinoy Idol (2008). While in 2014, he decided to join ABS-CBN's reality singing competition, The Voice of the Philippines (season 2). In his blind audition, he impressed the coaches as he was one of those ‘3-chair’ turners. Among the three coaches, he chose the international artist, record producer and Black Eyed Peas member, apl.de.ap.

From 2016 to February 2018, Ong was under Cornerstone Entertainment Inc., however he was no longer under Cornerstone after a contract renewal with Star Music. He is a member of the all-male vocal trio BuDaKhel along with Bugoy Drilon and Michael Pangilinan, and currently managed by KreativDen.

In 2024, Ong became one of the judges for TiktoClock's revival of 1980's amateur singing competition, Tanghalan ng Kampeon.

== Discography ==
=== Singles ===
- 2015 – Stay (On the Wings of Love)
- 2016 – Ikaw (FPJ's Ang Probinsyano)
- 2016 – Basta't Kasama Kita (FPJ's Ang Probinsyano)
- 2016 – To Love Again (Till I Met You)
- 2017 – How Did You Know (Ikaw Lang ang Iibigin)
- 2018 – Sana Dalawa ang Puso Ko (Sana Dalawa ang Puso)

== Filmography ==
Year	Show(s)	Notes	Network
2005	Pinoy Pop Superstar	Contestant	GMA Network
2008	Pinoy Idol	Contestant	GMA Network
2014	The Voice of the Philippines (season 2)	Semi-finalist	ABS-CBN
2015–2020	ASAP	Member of ASAP Soul Sessions (2016–17), Host (January–April 2018)/performer of ASAP The Love Connection (TLC) (January–November 2018)	ABS-CBN
2016	Himig Handog P-Pop Love Songs 2016	Interpreter of "Minamahal Pa Rin Ako"	ABS-CBN
2017	FPJ's Ang Probinsyano	Wedding singer	ABS-CBN
2018	The Blood Sisters	Wedding singer	ABS-CBN
2020–2021	Sunday Noontime Live!	Performer	TV5

Ong also did casual guestings in various ABS-CBN, GMA Network and TV5 shows:

- Umagang Kay Ganda
- Magandang Buhay
- It's Showtime
- Masked Singer Pilipinas (as 2-2-B; Winner)
- Sunday Noontime Live!
- Gandang Gabi, Vice!
- Tonight with Boy Abunda
- Eat Bulaga!
- Wowowin
- All-Out Sundays
- TiktoClock (also as a judge in Tanghalan ng Kampeon segment)

== Accolades ==
Year	Award-giving Body/Critics	Award(s)/Category	Nominated work	Result	Ref.
2014	Philippine Popular Music Festival	Best Song	Torpe (Composer)	3rd Prize	
2016	8th PMPC Star Awards for Music	Best New Male Recording Artist of the Year	Daryl Ong (album)	Nominated	
2016	8th PMPC Star Awards for Music	R&B Artist of the Year	Daryl Ong (album)	Nominated	
2016	8th PMPC Star Awards for Music	R&B Album of the Year	Daryl Ong (album)	Nominated	
2016	29th Awit Awards	Best Performance by a New Male Recording Artist	"Mabuti Pa"	Won	
2017	Wish 107.5 Music Awards	Music Artist of the Year	—N/a	Nominated	
2017	Wish 107.5 Music Awards	Best Wish Cover	Stay	Nominated	
2017	Wish 107.5 Music Awards	Best Wishclusive Performance by a Male Artist	Stay	Nominated	
2017	Wish 107.5 Music Awards	Wish Original Song of the Year by a Male Artist	Hopeless Romantic	Nominated	
2017	30th Awit Awards	Best Ballad Recording	Stay	Nominated	
2019	4th Wish 107.5 FM Music Awards	Wishclusive R&B Performance of the Year	Nais Kong Malaman Mo	Nominated	
2019	4th Wish 107.5 FM Music Awards	Wish R&B Song of the Year	Mahal Pa Rin Kita	Nominated	
