= Pops Fernandez =

Filipina actress and singer (born 1966)

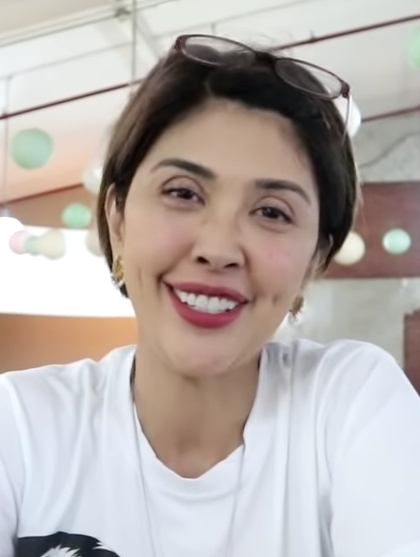
- Fernandez in January 2021
- Born: Maria Cielito Lukban Fernandez; December 12, 1966 (age 59); Lucban, Quezon, Philippines
- Occupations: Singer; producer; television host; actress; model
- Years active: 1979–present
- Spouse: Martin Nievera (m. 1986; ann. 2000)
- Children: 2, including Robin
- Musical career
- Origin: Manila, Philippines
- Genres: Pop; dance; R&B; OPM
- Instrument: Vocals

Maria Cielito "Pops" Lukban Fernandez (Tagalog: [paps pɛrˈnandɛs]; born December 12, 1966) is a Filipino singer, television host, actress, and businesswoman.

She has performed internationally and locally and has transitioned from singing to acting and hosting TV shows such as Penthouse Live! and ASAP. Her former husband is Martin Nievera, with whom she had two sons, Robin Nievera, a musician, and Ram Nievera, a cartoonist.

== Career ==
=== 2009–present ===
In 2009, Fernandez performed in the US leg of her The Divas 4 Divas Tour together with Regine Velasquez, Kuh Ledesma and Zsa Zsa Padilla. She released a new album under MCA Universal entitled Hope, which is a collection of cover versions including a new version of her 1983 song "Little Star".

In 2019, she is one of the 50 panelists around the world to participate in a new American reality talent show The World's Best by CBS. While she is the first Filipino to be featured as a judge in an American reality talent show, she was not the first judge from the Philippines. Bryan Boy, who is a Filipino, was a judge for ANTM USA. In 2020, Fernandez became the guest judge in The Clash Season 3 while Misalucha did not return for health reasons.

== Discography ==
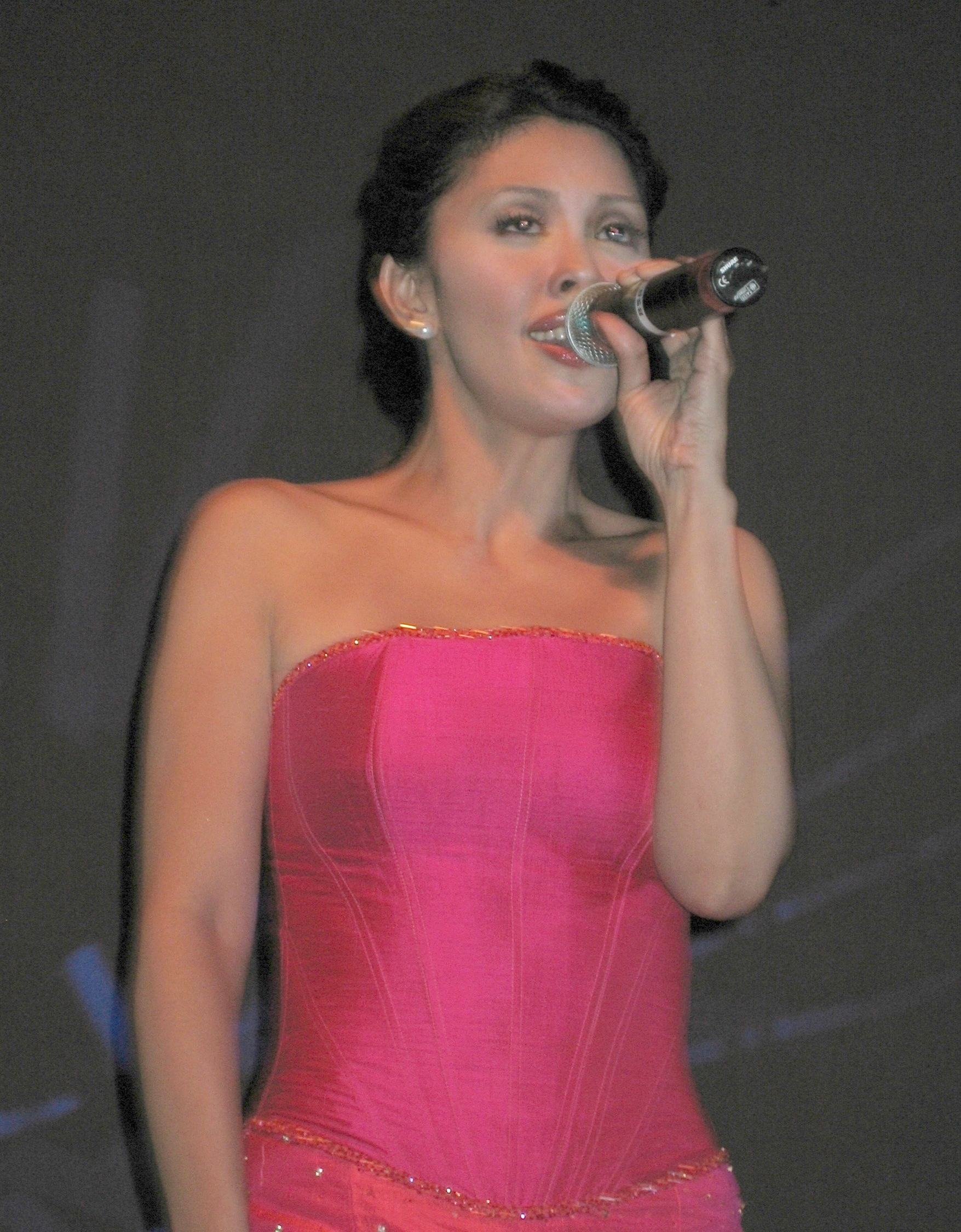
Fernandez at a concert in Copenhagen in 2005

=== Albums ===
- 1982: Pops (Canary Records)
- 1983: Pops Fernandez in Love (Canary Records)
- 1984: Heading for the Top (Canary Records)
- 1986: The Best of Pops Fernandez (OctoArts International)
- 1989: Awesome (Sunshine Records)
- 1991: Change (Sunshine Records)
- 1993: Pops (Dyna Music)
- 1996: Colours (Star Music)
- 1999: Nagmamahal Pa Rin sa 'Yo (Star Music)
- 2000: Moments (Viva Records)
- 2001: Shindig Live (Viva Records)
- 2001: The Story of Pops Fernandez (EMI Philippines)
- 2002: The Way I Feel Inside (Viva Records)
- 2004: When Words Are Not Enough (Warner Music)
- 2006: Silver (Viva Records)
- 2006: Don't Say Goodbye (re-release) (Vicor Music Corporation)
- 2009: Hope (MCA Music)
- 2012: No More Words (collaboration with Martin Nievera) (PolyEast Records)

=== Compilation appearances ===
Year	Album	Song(s)	Label(s)
1998	Sa Araw ng Pasko	"Christmas Won't Be The Same Without You"	Star Music

== Filmography ==
=== Film ===
- Love Ko 'To (1980)
- Pag-ibig Pa (1982)
- Just Say You Love Me (1982)
- Paano Ba ang Magmahal (1984)
- Give Me Five (1984)
- Bilanggo...Prisons No. 10069 (1985)
- Payaso (1986)
- Always and Forever (1986)
- Si Mister at Si Misis (1986)
- Shoot That Ball (1987)
- Stupid Cupid (1988)
- Sa Puso Ko Hahalik Ang Mundo (1988)
- Twinkle, Twinkle Magic Star (1988)
- Magic to Love (1989)
- Kung Maibabalik Ko Lang (1989)
- Tamis ng Unang Halik (1989)
- Linlang (1999)
- Gusto Ko Nang Lumigaya (2000)
- Videoke King (2002)
- Zsazsa Zaturnnah Ze Moveeh (2006) as Queen Feminah Suarestellar Baroux (main antagonist)
- Feelennial (2019)

=== Television ===
Year	Title	Role
1979	Eat Bulaga!	Herself/Host
1982–1987	The Penthouse Live!	Herself/Host/Performer
1992	P.O.P.S.	Herself/Host/Performer
1994	Miss Universe 1994 Presentation Show	Herself/Host
1995–2003; 2023–present	ASAP	Host/Performer
1999	Nagmamahal Pa Rin Sa Iyo	Various
2002	Morning Girls with Kris and Korina	Herself/Guest
2003–2004	SOP	Herself/Guest Performer
2003	All Together Now	Rina
2003–2004	Twin Hearts	Adelle Medira
2004	Sing-Galing ni Pops	Herself/Host
2005	POPS!	Herself/Host
2009	I Love Betty La Fea	Paulina
2009	Are You the Next Big Star?	Herself/Judge
2009	Celebrity Duets: Philippine Edition Season 3	Herself/Guest Performer
2012	Party Pilipinas	Herself/Guest Performer
2013	Sarap Diva	Herself/Guest
2013	The Ryzza Mae Show	Herself/Guest
2016	Born to Be a Star	Herself/Judge
2016	Eat Bulaga!	Herself/Guest
2019	The World's Best	Herself – Wall of the World
2020	Centerstage	Herself/Judge
2020	The Clash	Herself/Judge
2023	For the Love	Herself/Host
2025	It's Showtime	Herself/Hurado/Performer
2025	TV Patrol Express	Herself/Guest Star Patroller
2025	TV Patrol	Herself/Guest Star Patroller

== Awards ==
Year	Award giving body	Category	Nominated work	Results
2000	PMPC Star Awards for Television	Best Female TV Host	ASAP	Won
2000	PMPC Star Awards for Television	Female Star of the Night	—N/a	Won
2010	GMMSF Box-Office Entertainment Awards	Female Concert Performer of the Year	—N/a	Won
