= List of Filipino singers =

The following is a list of Filipino singers.

== A ==
- Dong Abay
- Craig Abaya
- Marc Abaya
- Abra
- Aljur Abrenica
- Vin Abrenica
- Migo Adecer
- Adie
- Jayda Avanzado
- Marcus Adoro
- Carina Afable
- Bayani Agbayani
- Aaron Agassi
- Carlos Agassi
- Anja Aguilar
- Freddie Aguilar
- Aiah
- Sayaka Akimoto
- Joey Albert
- Kyline Alcantara
- Leila Alcasid
- Ogie Alcasid
- Hajji Alejandro
- Nino Alejandro
- Rachel Alejandro
- Cynthia Alexander
- Ken Alfonso
- Christine Allado
- Barbie Almalbis
- Joan Almedilla
- Anthony Alonzo
- Pinky Amador
- Amapola
- Joanna Ampil
- Loisa Andalio
- Paulo Angeles
- Kris Angelica
- Faith Anne
- Allen Ansay
- Nico Antonio
- apl.de.ap
- Carlo Aquino
- Oliver Aquino
- Maria Aragon
- Junji Arias
- Brace Arquiza
- Nicole Laurel Asensio
- Thea Astley
- Dely Atay-Atayan
- Marion Aunor
- Nora Aunor
- Dingdong Avanzado
- Paulo Avelino
- Joey Ayala
- Yazmin Aziz
- Arthur Miguel

== B ==
- Nikki Bacolod
- Carlos Balcells
- Jovit Baldivino
- Andoy Balunbalunan
- Carol Banawa
- Ace Banzuelo
- Denise Barbacena
- Edward Barber
- Bayang Barrios
- Donnalyn Bartolome
- Heber Bartolome
- Lougee Basabas
- Janet Basco
- Bassilyo
- Joe Bataan
- Christian Bautista
- Mark Bautista
- Beabadoobee
- Sheena Belarmino
- Noven Belleza
- Jacob Benedicto
- Clara Benin
- Joey Benin
- Zild Benitez
- Janine Berdin
- Dar Bernardo
- Kathryn Bernardo
- Beverly
- Bea Binene
- Acel Bisa
- Blakdyak
- Rico Blanco
- Alisah Bonaobra
- Jimmy Bondoc
- AC Bonifacio
- Lou Bonnevie
- Anabel Bosch
- Andrea Brillantes
- K Brosas
- Ely Buendia
- Vincent Bueno
- Lance Busa
- Mikey Bustos

== C ==
- Marcus Cabais
- Federico Caballero
- Noel Cabangon
- Manuel Kabajar Cabase
- Nar Cabico
- Kaye Cal
- Jiggly Caliente
- Carmen Camacho
- Lito Camo
- Golden Cañedo
- Cha-Cha Cañete
- Lolita Carbon
- Maria Carpena
- Nancy Castiglione
- Eva Castillo
- Rainier Castillo
- Alex Castro
- Ryan Cayabyab
- Chris Cayzer
- Carl Cervantes
- Jose Mari Chan
- Chanty
- Ram Chaves
- Joyce Ching
- Kim Chiu
- Bryan Chong
- Kriesha Chu
- Kean Cipriano
- Charmaine Clamor
- Julia Clarete
- Skusta Clee
- Aria Clemente
- Clementine
- Colet
- Carmelle Collado
- Noel Comia Jr.
- Gabby Concepcion
- KC Concepcion
- Sam Concepcion
- Joao Constancia
- Yeng Constantino
- Teddy Corpuz
- Pilita Corrales
- Roel Cortez
- Billy Crawford
- Donna Cruz
- Garry Cruz
- Geneva Cruz
- Israel Cruz
- Sheryl Cruz
- Sunshine Cruz
- Timmy Cruz
- Tirso Cruz III
- Radha Cuadrado
- Monica Cuenco
- Josh Cullen
- Jenn Cuneta
- Sharon Cuneta
- Anne Curtis
- Curtismith
- Lindsay Custodio
- Fides Cuyugan-Asensio

== D ==
- Faith da Silva
- Johnoy Danao
- Ebe Dancel
- Rita Daniela
- Dingdong Dantes
- Karina Constantino David
- Rob Deniel
- Esang de Torres
- Glaiza de Castro
- Jex de Castro
- JM de Guzman
- Klarisse de Guzman
- Dominic Roque
- Gigi de Lana
- Isabelle de Leon
- Joey de Leon
- Keempee de Leon
- Esang de Torres
- JC de Vera
- Lourd de Veyra
- Ella del Rosario
- Angelika Dela Cruz
- Katy de la Cruz
- Claire de la Fuente
- Dianne dela Fuente
- Ernesto Dela Peña
- Atang de la Rama
- Renee dela Rosa
- Moira Dela Torre
- Rosita De La Vega
- Ai-Ai delas Alas
- Enchong Dee
- Kisses Delavin
- Dessa
- Francine Diaz
- Celia Díaz Laurel
- Ney Dimaculangan
- Zephanie Dimaranan
- Dionela
- Charlie Dizon
- Kim Domingo
- Shanti Dope
- Gwyn Dorado
- Bugoy Drilon
- Dulce
- Mich Dulce
- Bullet Dumas
- Elaine Duran
- DJ Durano
- Jay Durias
- Jason Dy

== E ==
- Andrew E.
- Kyle Echarri
- Gabby Eigenmann
- Max Eigenmann
- Carren Eistrup
- Maymay Entrata
- Bituin Escalante
- Vivoree Esclito
- Miguel Escueta
- Darren Espanto
- Brenan Espartinez
- Gretchen Espina
- Abel Estanislao
- Karla Estrada
- KD Estrada
- Lyka Estrella
- Eva Eugenio
- Heart Evangelista

== F ==
- Frencheska Farr
- Tats Faustino
- Carolyn Fe
- Seth Fedelin
- Anna Fegi
- Felip
- Mellow Fellow
- Andión Fernández
- Cyrus Fernandez
- Grae Fernandez
- Juris Fernandez
- Pops Fernandez
- Susan Fernandez
- Arman Ferrer
- Florante
- Gerphil Flores
- Rose Fostanes
- Jovita Fuentes
- Susan Fuentes

== G ==
- Flow G
- Jennie Gabriel
- Lyca Gairanod
- Vice Ganda
- Gabbi Garcia
- Jamir Garcia
- Maricris Garcia
- Ylona Garcia
- Boboy Garrovillo
- Sarah Geronimo
- Janno Gibbs
- Eddie Gil
- Enrique Gil
- Nikki Gil
- King Girado
- Gloc-9
- Anaya Go
- Rachelle Ann Go
- Jensen Gomez
- Shanaia Gomez
- Alex Gonzaga
- Toni Gonzaga
- Otoniel Gonzaga
- Jeric Gonzales
- Lexi Gonzales
- Enya Gonzalez
- Marrion Gopez
- Alodia Gosiengfiao
- Gary Granada
- Isabel Granada
- Catriona Gray
- Angel Guardian
- Yamyam Gucong
- Tootsie Guevara
- Gladys Guevarra
- Sela Guia
- Matteo Guidicelli
- Khimo Gumatay
- Diego Gutierrez
- Gabrielle Gutierrez
- Janine Gutierrez
- Jon Gutierrez

== H ==
- Mike Hanopol
- Syd Hartha
- Solenn Heussaff
- Hev Abi
- Honcho
- Kai Honasan

== I ==
- Ruby Ibarra
- Arnell Ignacio
- Isabel Granada
- Alexa Ilacad
- Masino Intaray
- Nanette Inventor
- Agot Isidro

== J ==
- Ramon Jacinto
- Lana Jalosjos
- Janelle Jamer
- Al James
- Jay R
- Danny Javier
- Mica Javier
- Patricia Javier
- Jaya
- Anthony Jennings
- Jhoanna
- Melizza Jimenez
- RJ Jimenez
- JJ
- Ignatius Jones
- Denise Julia
- Júnior
- Justin

== K ==
- Kakie
- Clinton Kane
- JV Kapunan
- Karencitta
- Lala Karmela
- Karylle
- Gab Chee Kee
- Angela Ken
- Keno
- Yasmien Kurdi
- Kyla
- Ranz Kyle
- Jensen Kyra

== L ==
- Sylvia La Torre
- Juan Karlos Labajo
- Sophia Laforteza
- Dave Lamar
- Davey Langit
- Reese Lansangan
- Renaldo Lapuz
- Maureen Larrazabal
- Raymond Lauchengco
- Denise Laurel
- Kris Lawrence
- Kuh Ledesma
- Celeste Legaspi
- Ronnie Liang
- Lilet
- Lili
- Ralph Joseph Lim
- Xian Lim
- L.A. Lopez
- JoAnne Lorenzana
- Christine Love
- Bing Loyzaga
- Laarni Lozada
- Maloy Lozanes
- Champ Lui Pio
- Nadine Lustre

== M ==
- Ron Macapagal
- Mercy Sunot
- Jed Madela
- Elmo Magalona
- Francis Magalona
- Frank Magalona
- Jolina Magdangal
- Mahal
- Lara Maigue
- Maki
- Maloi
- Ramiele Malubay
- Bamboo Manalac
- Miko Manguba
- Sam Mangubat
- Ric Manrique Jr.
- Manskee
- Budoy Marabiles
- Raymund Marasigan
- Mau Marcelo
- Reyanna Maria
- Belle Mariano
- OJ Mariano
- Jan Marini
- Marlene
- Karel Marquez
- Yasser Marta
- Kristoffer Martin
- Dia Maté
- Diomedes Maturan
- Maxie
- Bailey May
- Koreen Medina
- Luke Mejares
- John Melo
- Christian Mendoza
- Maine Mendoza
- Jennylyn Mercado
- Eddie Mesa
- Mikha
- Ez Mil
- Sam Milby
- Aubrey Miles
- Armi Millare
- Ara Mina
- Chito Miranda
- Kelvin Miranda
- G3 Misa
- Lani Misalucha
- Kim Molina
- Boy Mondragon
- Cesar Montano
- Vinci Montaner
- Sophia Montecarlo
- Kai Montinola
- Seann Miley Moore
- Makisig Morales
- Vina Morales
- Sofia Moran
- Tillie Moreno
- Ena Mori
- Stefano Mori
- Akira Morishita
- Morissette
- Marlo Mortel
- Edgar Mortiz
- Mrld
- AJ Muhlach
- Ayen Munji-Laurel
- Arci Muñoz
- Mark Adam

== N ==
- Kitchie Nadal
- Maiko Nakamura
- Marri Nallos
- Nikko Natividad
- Roselle Nava
- Rodel Naval
- Leah Navarro
- Robby Navarro
- Sitti Navarro
- Vhong Navarro
- Krizza Neri
- Arthur Nery
- Jan Nieto
- Bert Nievera
- Martin Nievera
- Robin Nievera
- Nina
- Nityalila
- Grace Nono
- Elha Nympha

== O ==
- Clarissa Ocampo
- Diether Ocampo
- Miles Ocampo
- Jane Oineza
- Ayanna Oliva
- Ashtine Olviga
- Paolo Onesa
- Daryl Ong
- Margaret Ortega
- Mariane Osabel
- Jocelyn Oxlade

== P ==
- Pablo
- Sofia Pablo
- Manny Pacquiao
- Daniel Padilla
- Kylie Padilla
- Zsa Zsa Padilla
- Moymoy Palaboy
- Mariel Pamintuan
- Danita Paner
- Tina Paner
- Jett Pangan
- Donny Pangilinan
- Gab Pangilinan
- Michael Pangilinan
- Rochelle Pangilinan
- Fred Panopio
- Imelda Papin
- Joey Paras
- Ala Paredes
- Sonny Parsons
- Inigo Pascual
- Piolo Pascual
- Jim Paredes
- Carmen Pateña
- Markus Paterson
- Heaven Peralejo
- Rica Peralejo
- Eddie Peregrina
- Myk Perez
- Arnel Pineda
- Eliza Pineda
- Lovi Poe
- Pokwang
- Marcelito Pomoy
- Richard Poon
- Chickoy Pura
- Yassi Pressman
- Rico J. Puno

== Q ==
- Odette Quesada
- Quest
- Angeline Quinto
- Mikee Quintos
- Zia Quizon

== R ==
- Jay R
- Maris Racal
- Sue Ramirez
- Khalil Ramos
- Regine Velasquez
- Rhian Ramos
- Elizabeth Ramsey
- Ina Raymundo
- John Raymundo
- Sunday Reantaso
- April Boy Regino
- Sheryn Regis
- James Reid
- Willie Revillame
- Didith Reyes
- Joaquin Reyes
- Manilyn Reynes
- Richard Reynoso
- Alden Richards
- Rans Rifol
- Snaffu Rigor
- Ariel Rivera
- Jamie Rivera
- Marian Rivera
- Rocky Rivera
- Jak Roberto
- Josephine Roberto
- Jhoanna Robles
- Bing Rodrigo
- Juan Rodrigo
- Olivia Rodrigo
- Tom Rodriguez
- Anthony Rosaldo
- Jericho Rosales
- RJ Rosales
- Wilbert Ross
- Karl Roy
- Myra Ruaro
- Kyle Raphael

== S ==
- Michael Sager
- Nur-Ana Sahidulla
- Ella May Saison
- Rhap Salazar
- Joy Salinas
- Lea Salonga
- Anji Salvacion
- Janella Salvador
- Maja Salvador
- Beverly Salviejo
- Nikki Samonte
- Sampaguita
- Arra San Agustin
- Julie Anne San Jose
- Sharlene San Pedro
- Josh Santana
- Bella Santiago
- Jesús Manuel Santiago
- Randy Santiago
- Shermaine Santiago
- Aicelle Santos
- Erik Santos
- Gerald Santos
- Judy Ann Santos
- Vilma Santos
- Vehnee Saturno
- Ric Segreto
- Aiza Seguerra
- Japs Sergio
- Shaira
- Sheena
- Jay-R Siaboc
- Armida Siguion-Reyna
- Blaster Silonga
- Marco Sison
- Gabb Skribikin
- Fyang Smith
- Pepe Smith
- Sofia
- Akiko Solon
- Somedaydream
- Sarah Geronimo
- Jona Soquite
- Carmen Soriano
- Maricel Soriano
- Ciara Sotto
- Gian Sotto
- Tito Sotto
- Val Sotto
- Vic Sotto
- J. Rey Soul
- Stacey
- Stell
- Markki Stroem
- Max Surban
- Maxine Syjuco

== T ==
- Zack Tabudlo
- Ruben Tagalog
- KZ Tandingan
- Julianne Tarroja
- Antoinette Taus
- Ian Tayao
- Geoff Taylor
- Bryan Termulo
- Thor
- Jeremiah Tiangco
- Athena Tibi
- Andrea Torres
- Dennis Trillo
- Panky Trinidad

== U ==
- Bianca Umali
- Unique
- Mocha Uson

== V ==
- Michael V
- Basil Valdez
- Joaquin Pedro Valdes
- Krissel Valdez
- Nikki Valdez
- Gab Valenciano
- Gary Valenciano
- Kiana Valenciano
- BP Valenzuela
- Rey Valera
- Volts Vallejo
- Vernie Varga
- Jake Vargas
- Tuesday Vargas
- Julie Vega
- Katrina Velarde
- Camile Velasco
- Regine Velasquez
- Lilian Velez
- Emmanuelle Vera
- Renz Verano
- Darlene Vibares
- Viktoria
- Yoyoy Villame
- Iya Villania
- Buboy Villar
- Jessica Villarubin
- Cris Villonco
- Jona Viray
- Nyoy Volante

== W ==
- Jillian Ward
- Monique Wilson
- Shimica Wong
- Victor Wood
- James Wright

== Y ==
- George T. Yang
- Richard Yap
- Mitoy Yonting
- JM Yosures
- Lauren Young
- Yael Yuzon
- Yanni Yuzon

== Z ==
- Jessa Zaragoza
- Lloyd Zaragoza
- Zendee
- Nonoy Zuñiga
- Jake Zyrus

== See also ==
- List of Filipino composers
- List of Philippine-based music groups
- List of singer-songwriters
- Lists of musicians
