= Salinas (surname) =

Salinas is a surname that has Spanish origin and is derived from the word "salina" meaning "saltworks" or "salt mine". Originating in Spain, it is a common surname in Spanish-speaking countries.

Notable individuals with the surname include:

== General ==
- Ana Reeves Salinas (born 1948), Chilean actress
- Angela Salinas (born 1953), U.S. Marine Corps general
- Alfonso Jose Sol Salinas Muzquiz, (born 1968), Civil engineer
- Antonio Salinas, Mexican dancer and actor
- Claudia Salinas (born 1983), Mexican model and actress
- Domingo de Salinas (1547–1600), Spanish Roman Catholic prelate
- Efrain Salinas y Velasco (1886–1968), Bishop of Mexico
- Elma Salinas Ender (born 1953), U.S. lawyer and judge
- Emiliano Salinas (born 1976), Mexican businessman, son of Carlos Salinas de Gortari
- Ezequiel D. Salinas (1908–2007), Mexican-American judge
- Francisco de Salinas, 16th-century Spanish music theorist
- Froy Salinas (1939–2021), American politician
- Gustavo Salinas Carmiña (1893–1964), Mexican aviation pioneer
- H. Scott Salinas, U.S. composer and musician
- Horacio Salinas (born 1951), Chilean guitarist and composer
- Hugo Salinas Price (born 1932), Mexican businessman and founder of Grupo Elektra
- Irvin "Pee Wee" Salinas (born 1988), Mexican-American singer and actor
- Jason Salinas (born 1984), U.S. handcrafted eyewear designer
- Joel Salinas (born 1983), American medical researcher
- Jone Salinas (1918–1992), Italian actress
- Jorge Salinas (born 1968), Mexican actor
- Joy Salinas, Filipina singer
- Juan Pablo Salinas y Teruel (1871–1946), Spanish painter
- Luis Salinas (born 1957), Argentinian jazz guitarist
- Luis Omar Salinas (1937–2008), U.S. Chicano poet
- María Elena Salinas, U.S. journalist and author
- María de Salinas (c. 1490–1539), Spanish noblewoman and lady-in-waiting to Catherine of Aragón
- Moisés Salinas (born 1966), Mexican scholar and activist
- Nora Salinas (born 1976), Mexican actress
- Pedro Salinas (1891–1951), Spanish writer
- Porfirio Salinas (1910–1973), Mexican-American painter
- Raúl Salinas de Gortari (born 1946), Mexican businessman and convicted felon, brother of Carlos Salinas de Gortari
- Ric Salinas (born 1960), Salvadoran American actor, writer and producer
- Ricardo Salinas Pliego (born 1955), Mexican businessman, son of Hugo Salinas Price, founder of Grupo Salina

== Politics ==
- Alberto Salinas Carranza (1892–1970), Mexican aviator and politician
- Andrea Salinas (born 1970), U.S. politician
- Antonio Salinas y Castañeda (1810–1874), Peruvian politician and Mayor of Lima
- Carlos Salinas de Gortari (born 1948), Mexican president
- Carmen Salinas (1939–2021), Mexican actress and politician
- Carmen Salinas de la Vega (1807–1881), Ecuadorian aristocrat and First Lady
- Constantino Salinas (1886–1966), Spanish physician and politician
- Diego de Salinas (1649–1720), last Spanish Governor of Gibraltar
- Emilio Salinas (1864–1927), Mexican military man and politician
- Francisco García Salinas (1786–1841), Mexican politician and eponym of Jerez de García Salinas in Zacatecas, Mexico
- Francisco Vidal Salinas (born 1953), Chilean politician
- Glafiro Salinas Mendiola (1946–2025), Mexican politician
- Gregorio de Salinas Varona (1647 or 1650 –1720), Spanish administrator, Governor of Texas, Nuevo León, Honduras, Coahuila
- Jaime Salinas (born 1963), Peruvian politician
- Javier Salinas Narváez (born 1965), Mexican politician
- José Arturo Salinas Garza (born 1975), Mexican politician
- José Miguel Insulza Salinas, Chilean politician
- Josefina Salinas Pérez (born 1965), Mexican politician
- Juan de Salinas, 17th Century governor of Spanish Florida
- Juan de Salinas y Zenitagoya (1755–1810), Spanish colonial officer from Ecuador
- Maria Isabel Salinas (born 1966), Spanish politician
- Raul G. Salinas (born 1947), U.S. businessman and former mayor of Laredo, Texas.
- Raúl Salinas Lozano (1917–2004), Mexican economist and politician, father of Carlos Salinas de Gortari
- Simon Salinas (born 1956), U.S. politician from California
- Alfonso Sol Salinas Muzquiz (born 1968)

== Sports ==
- Andrés Salinas (born 1986), Colombian footballer
- Ariel Salinas (born 1989), Chilean footballer
- Carlos Salinas (footballer) (1938–2022), Peruvian footballer
- César Salinas (1961–2020), Bolivian football administrator
- Claudio Salinas (born 1976), Chilean footballer
- Dennis Salinas (born 1986), Salvadoran footballer
- Felipe Salinas (born 1982), Chilean footballer
- Félix Salinas (1939–2021), Peruvian footballer
- Guillermo Salinas (born 1938), Chilean boxer
- Gustavo Salinas, Mexican sports shooter
- Hans Salinas (born 1990), Chilean footballer
- Jasmine Salinas (born 1992), American dragster driver
- Jorge Salinas (Paraguayan footballer) (born 1992), Paraguayan footballer
- Julio Salinas (born 1962), Spanish footballer
- Leonardo Salinas (born 1980), Mexican swimmer
- Lucas Salinas, (born 1995), Brazilian footballer
- Néstor Salinas (born 1993), Spanish footballer
- Óscar Salinas (born 1988), Chilean footballer
- Pablo Salinas, Bolivian footballer
- Patxi Salinas (born 1963), Spanish footballer
- Raúl Alberto Salinas (born 1978), also known as La Bala Salinas, Mexican footballer
- Richard Adrián Salinas (born 1988), Paraguayan footballer
- Rodolfo Salinas (born 1987), Mexican footballer
- Rodrigo Salinas (footballer, born 1986), Argentine footballer
- Rodrigo Salinas (footballer, born 1988), Mexican footballer
- Rodrigo Salinas Muñoz (born 1989), Chilean handball player
- Rolando Salinas (1889–?), Chilean racewalker
- Shea Salinas (born 1986), U.S. football (soccer) player
- Salinas, the ring name of Shelly Martinez in TNA Wrestling
- Valeria Salinas González (born 2000), Mexican female volleyball player
- Yoandris Salinas (born 1985), Cuban professional boxer
- Yonathan Salinas (born 1990), Venezuelan cyclist
- Yostin Salinas (born 1998), Costa-Rican footballer
