= Dyna Music =

Philippine record label

Dyna Music Entertainment Corporation
- Founded: 1957
- Founder: James Go Dy
- Status: Active
- Genre: P-pop; OPM
- Country of origin: Philippines
- Location: Pasig, Philippines
- Official website: dynamusic.com.ph

Dyna Music Entertainment Corporation is a Filipino record label. It is one of the major record companies in the Philippines; in the 1960s, it was the country's largest licensee of foreign labels. The first independent record label in the Philippines, Dyna Music was founded as Dyna Products, Inc. by businessman James Go Dy in 1959. It is a member of the Philippine Association of the Record Industry (PARI).

Dyna Music also released video karaoke VCDs versions of the label's songs in the Philippines. It also became the first recording company in the country to produce and distribute a large catalogue of audiophile CD titles from the label's homegrown and foreign artists' inventory, using 24-bit, 192 kHz digitally remastered audio processing technology.

== History ==
Dyna was established in 1957 by James Go Dy. It became the first recording label in the Philippines. During most of the period from 1970s to the 1990s, It was the local distributor for PolyGram (including MGM Records, Polydor Records, Casablanca Records, RSO Records, Mercury Records, Fontana Records, Island Records, A&M Records, and London Records), Hansa Records (for Modern Talking releases only), and EMI Records (under the name Dyna EMI and later Dyna EMI Virgin). In the late 1980s and in the mid-1990s, Dyna did not renew their contracts with both EMI and PolyGram, and two local companies assumed distribution of their releases, Cosmic Records assumed distribution of PolyGram releases and later became PolyCosmic Records in 1993, then PolyGram Records Philippines in 1997, and after the merger with Universal Music Group in 1999, MCA Music Inc. (now known as UMUSIC Philippines), while EMI signed with OctoArts International in 1995, and they became OctoArts-EMI, which eventually became PolyEast Records.

== Notable artists ==
Notable artists are:

- 5th Avenue
- AfterImage
- Al Comendador
- Aldoe Rubee
- Amormio Cillian Jr.
- Andrew Christopher
- Armida Siguion-Reyna
- Bea Michelle
- Bert Buena and The PBS Rondalla
- Bimbo Cerrudo
- Binky Lampano
- Bits N' Pieces
- Bing Rodrigo
- Buddy Castillo
- Carmen Soriano
- Charisse
- Chickababes
- Chikoy Pura
- Cholo Escaño
- Christine
- Cindy Rosas
- Claire de la Fuente
- Crystal Pop
- Cynthia Alexander
- Daisy Reyes
- Danica Sotto-Pingris
- Dingdong Avanzado
- Dv8
- Eddie Ilarde
- Emeline Celis
- Efren Montes
- Elrod
- Fire (Ana & Soraya)
- Franco Laurel
- Fred Panopio
- Freddie Camino
- Gary Bareña
- Gaya Band
- Glaiza de Castro
- Gloria Sevilla
- Homer Paredes
- Ilang Yaya
- Inter Racial Society (I.R.S.)
- Introvoys
- Isabel Granada
- Jaime Salazar
- Jake Vargas
- James Sumilang
- Joey Albert
- Joey Palomar
- Jose Mari Chan
- Jose Mari Gonzales
- Joseph Polk
- Julia Clarete
- Kantula
- Keekaayz
- Keno
- Leslie Montes
- Lorna Galvez
- Lou Bonnevie
- Lynn Sherman
- Mae Rivera
- Maegan Aguilar
- Marcy Bautista
- Marivic Arias
- Martin Nievera
- Migz Haleco
- Nino Alejandro
- Noelle Cassandra
- Nonoy Zuñiga
- Nora Hermosa
- Pamboy Lorenzo
- Paola Luz
- Pat Castillo
- Pauline Sevilla
- Pilita Corrales
- Pops Fernandez
- Priscilla Almeda
- Randy Madrid
- Raul Roxas
- Raymond Lauchengco
- Retrospect
- Reycard Duet
- Ric Arellano
- Richard Tan
- Rowena Michael
- S&H
- Second Wind
- Shuga
- Six Part Invention (S.P.I.)
- Sugar Babes
- Tessie "Peachy" Velasco
- The Big 3 Sullivans
- The Breed
- The Electromaniacs
- The Members
- Tina Paner
- Tony Santos and his Rondalla
- Tots Tolentino
- Tungaw
- Vangel & Rico
- Vernie Varga
- Vigil
- Violent Playground
- Weena
- Willie Nepomuceno
- Willy Cruz
- Willo
- Ynez Veneracion
- Yoly Sasis
- Yoyo Mirafuentes
- Zander Khan
