= Dóris Monteiro =

Brazilian singer and actress (1934–2023)

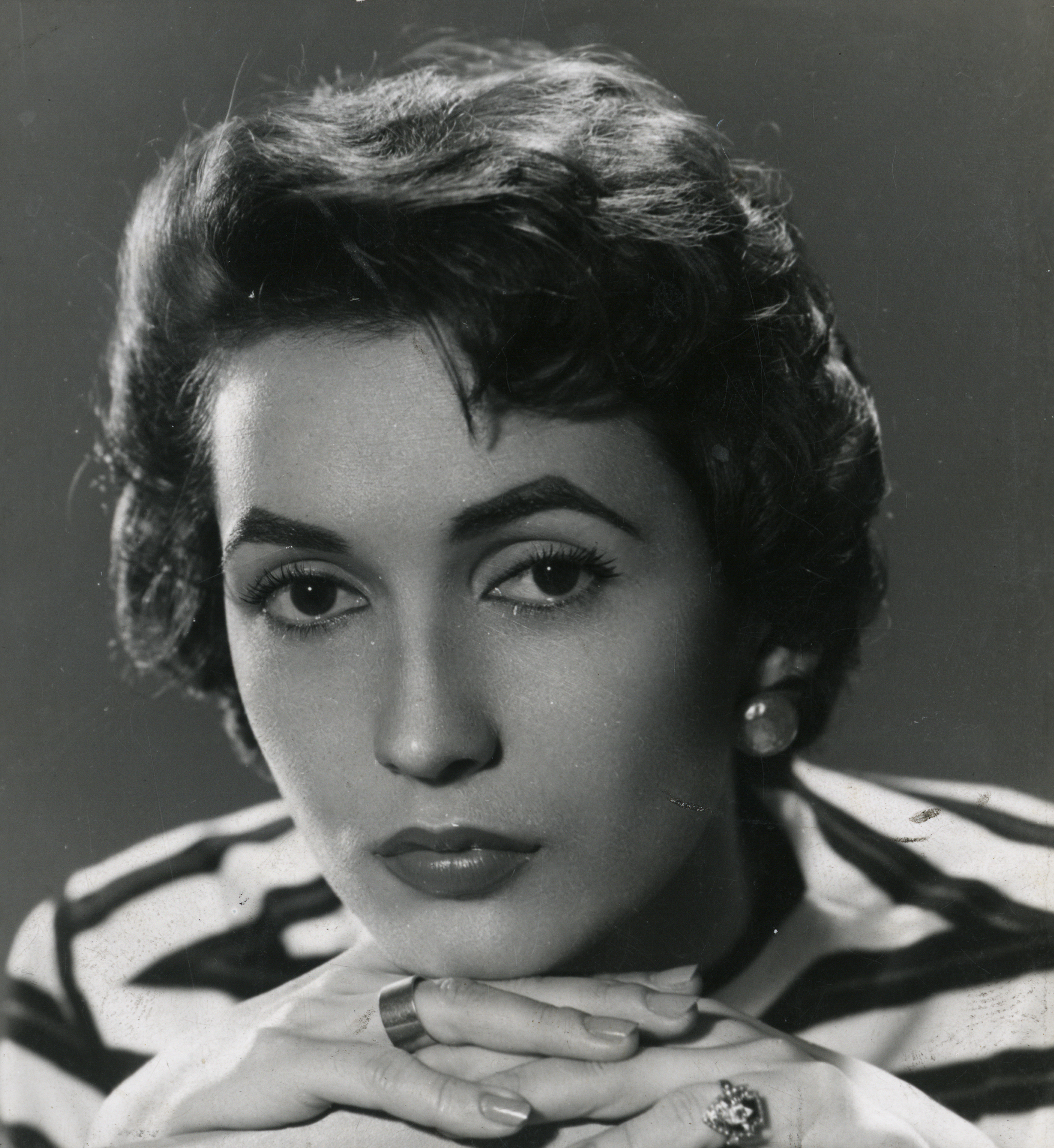
Monteiro in 1960

Adelina Dóris Monteiro (23 October 1934 – 24 July 2023) was a Brazilian singer and actress. She was discovered In 1949 on the radio show Papel Carbono with Renato Murce, broadcast on national radio in Rio de Janeiro.

== Career ==
=== 1950s ===
In 1951, as a student in Colegio Dom Pedro II, Monteiro was invited to sing on Radio Guanabara. She later went on to Rádio Tupi, where she stayed for eight years. She sang at the Copacabana Palace Hotel nightclub and made her recording debut with 'Se Você Se Importasse' (If You'd Cared) which was released on a 78 rpm disc. In 1952, she was elected Queen of Cadets; and recorded 'Fecho Meus Olhos' (I Close My Eyes) by José Maria de Abreu. Her first longplay was released in 1954; it included: 'Vento Soprando' (Wind Blowing) by Continental Records, featuring 'Graças a Deus' (Thank God) (Fernando César) and 'Jogue a Rede No Mar' (Throw the Net to the Water) (Fernando César Nazareno de Brito). In 1955, she hosted her own TV show at the TV Tupi in Rio de Janeiro. In 1956, she released 'Mocinho Bonito' (Pretty Guy) by Billy Blanco - one of her greatest hits.

=== 1960s ===
In 1963, Monteiro recorded longplay samba Tasty, music by John Melo - songs that were hits What I like you (Silvio César) and She looked at me (Ed Lincoln/Silvio César) - Philips recording. Doris Miller and 1964, with music Samba (Marcos Valle/Paulo Sérgio Valle) - Philips Records label. In 1969 her hit Changing the conversation (Maurício Tapajós/Hermínio Bello de Carvalho) spent about five months on the charts. She released Do-Re-Mi from Fernando César - for Odeon.

=== 1970s ===
In 1970, Monteiro recorded music that had been highlighted green "Coco" (Roberto Carlos/Erasmo Carlos). During the 70s she recorded with the singers Miltinho and Lúcio Alves.

=== 1980s ===
In the 1980s, Monteiro recorded with Doris Miller for Copacabana Records. She released "These Women" with Doris, Elizeth Carter, Helena and Angela Maria - in 1986 for Continental Records.

=== 1990s ===
Samba-Canção series "Brazilian Academy of Music" - songs that stood out: "It rains out there" for Tito Madi, "Rounds" of Paul Vanzolini carnival and "Morning" (Antonio Maria/Luiz Bonfá).

=== Film ===
Monteiro appeared in the film Needle in the Haystack of 1953 singing the song with the same name, and was awarded as an actress. In 1954 she took part in street sunless Alex Viany. "Everything is music" of Louis de Barros. "From strength to strength" of Carlos Manga and "wagon" (the latter alongside Mazzaropi) in 1957.

== Tours ==
Casino Punta del Este in Uruguay, London and Coimbra along with Dorival Caymmi in Portugal Osaka, Nagoya and Tokyo in Japan.

- 2002 -Room Baden Powell- series. At teatime, the RioArte.
- 2003 -Centro Cultural Banco do Brazil- sang hits from the 1950s. One was a farce and Luiz Reis and Haroldo Barbosa.
- 2004 - celebration of her 70 years - gifted by record labels Universal and EMI to reissue compact disc twelve of her best longplays.

== Personal life and death ==
Monteiro was born in Rio de Janeiro on 23 October 1934. She died on 24 July 2023, at the age of 88.

Monteiro was a longtime friend of Leny Andrade, who also died on the same day. The joint wake took place on 25 July 2023 at Theatro Municipal in Rio de Janeiro.

== Bibliography ==
- Severiano, Jairo and MELLO, Zuza Homem de -The song in time- Vol.II - Publisher 34-368 pp. - 1998 - São Paulo - ISBN 85-7326-119-6
