= Christine Love =

Christine Love may refer to:

- Christine Love (singer), Filipina singer
- Christine Love (writer), Canadian visual novel writer and video game developer
