= Una Kang Naging Akin =

2008 Philippine television drama series

- Title card
- Also known as: When You Were Mine
- Genre: Romantic drama
- Based on: Una Kang Naging Akin (1991) by Laurice Guillen
- Directed by: Joel Lamangan
- Starring: Angelika Dela Cruz; Wendell Ramos; Maxene Magalona
- Theme music composer: Tata Betita
- Opening theme: "Una Kang Naging Akin" by Ram Chaves
- Country of origin: Philippines
- Original language: Tagalog
- No. of episodes: 80

Production
- Executive producer: Camille Gomba-Montaño
- Camera setup: Multiple-camera setup
- Running time: 25–35 minutes
- Production company: GMA Entertainment TV

Original release
- Network: GMA Network
- Release: September 1 – December 19, 2008

Una Kang Naging Akin (transl. you became mine first / international title: When You Were Mine) is a 2008 Philippine television drama romance series broadcast by GMA Network. Based on a 1991 Philippine film of the same title, the series is the tenth instalment of Sine Novela. Directed by Joel Lamangan, it stars Angelika Dela Cruz, Wendell Ramos, and Maxene Magalona. It premiered on September 1, 2008, on the network's Dramarama sa Hapon line up. The series concluded on December 19, 2008, with a total of 80 episodes.

== Premise ==
Tragedy strikes when the helicopter that Nick crashes on a remote island. A body is found in the crash site but it turned out to be Nick's officemate whose name was not listed in the passenger manifesto. The "death" of Nick caused great grief to Vanessa since she was already betrothed to be married to the young man. On the remote island, Nick meets Modesto Mallari, a marine biologist. Because of his memory loss, Nick introduces himself as Darwin. Mallari takes Darwin to his home where he introduces his daughter, Jessa. As time passes by, the two develop feelings for each other and have a child together. Darwin becomes involved in another accident that triggers the return of his memories. With the return of his memory, Darwin's identity, as well as Jessa and their child, no longer exist in Nick's recollection.

== Cast and characters ==
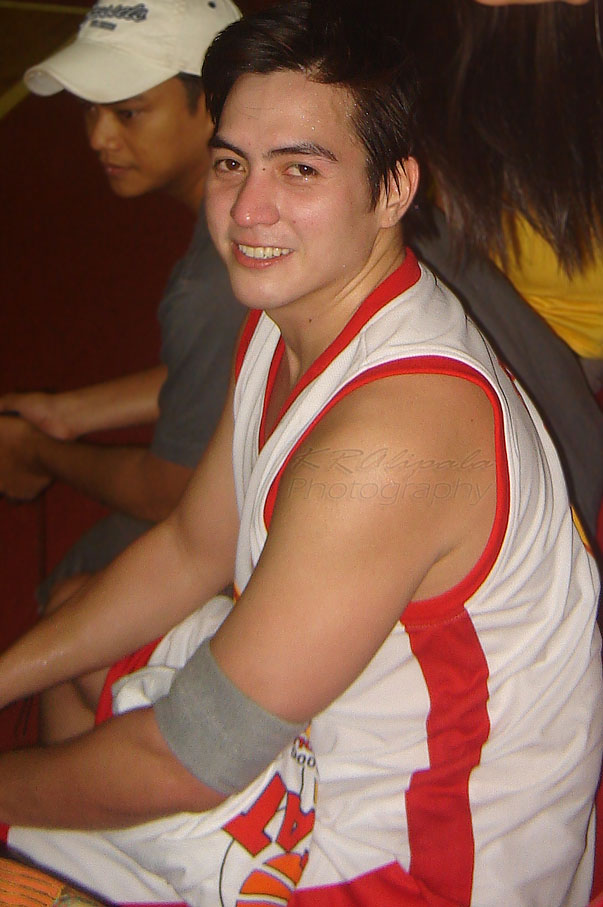
Wendell Ramos portrays Nick Adriano.

Lead cast

- Angelika Dela Cruz as Vanessa Yumul
- Wendell Ramos as Nick Adriano / Darwin Salvador
- Maxene Magalona as Jessa Mallari / Luisita

Supporting cast

- Gina Alajar as Luisa Yumul
- Alfred Vargas as Ronnie Bautista
- LJ Reyes as Liway Mallari
- Tony Mabesa as Jaime Adriano
- Raquel Villavicencio as Margarita Adriano
- Ricardo Cepeda as Modesto Mallari
- Maggie Wilson as Annie Villanueva
- Mel Martinez as Eli Solis
- Jim Pebangco as Anding
- Gillete Sandico as Agnes
- Paolo Paraiso as Marvin
- Paolo Serrano as Jule
- Mika Dela Cruz as Anna
- Kevin Santos as Biboy
- Frank Garcia as Raffy
- Hazel Ann Mendoza as Violy

== Ratings ==
According to AGB Nielsen Philippines' Mega Manila household television ratings, the pilot episode of Una Kang Naging Akin earned a 21.5% rating. The final episode scored a 24.9% rating.
