= Sam Mangubat =

Filipino singer-songwriter

- Born: Samuel Marbella Mangubat; December 21, 1990 (age 35); Calamba, Laguna, Philippines
- Occupations: singer; songwriter; vocal arranger; photographer; video director
- Years active: 2012–present
- Musical career
- Genres: pop; rock; R&B
- Instrument: Vocals
- Labels: Star Music (2017–present)

Samuel Marbella Mangubat (born 21 December 1990), better known as Sam Mangubat, is a Filipino singer and songwriter. He gained significant popularity when he participated in the first season of Tawag ng Tanghalan of the noontime television show It's Showtime, a singing competition broadcast on ABS-CBN, and becoming its first runner-up.

== Early life ==
Mangubat was born on December 21, 1990, and raised in Calamba, Laguna, Philippines. His father, Wilfredo Mangubat, is a pastor of a Christian church in Santo Tomas, Batangas, whereas his mother, Crisanta (Santi) Marbella-Mangubat, is a housewife and a former City Municipal Administrative Officer. He is the eldest of five siblings—the other four are Jedidiah, Jonathan, Divine Faith, and Anne Catherine. Mangubat claimed in his social media account that even at an early age of two, he had already been showing a penchant for singing. He attended secondary school at Jesus Is Lord Colleges Foundation, Inc., where he graduated valedictorian. He finished Digital Arts and Design in Malayan Colleges Laguna.

=== Career ===
Mangubat started out as a freelance photographer and videographer. During this period, he started to create and upload cover songs on YouTube, ReverbNation, and SoundCloud. Right after college, he worked as a call center agent but he left after four months because the nature of the work tends to burn him up. Sometime during this period, he also became an English tutor to children. As he continued being a freelance photographer and videographer, he did some stints on directing and editing music videos for David DiMuzio. These videos have collectively accumulated millions of views on YouTube. As he kept uploading more cover performances, he gradually gained followers and eventually got discovered by several companies such as a Karaoke company which offered him singing job in Karaoke training.

Some of Mangubat's other notable activities include the following: co-writing original songs for albums of XLR8 and myPhone; directing several commercial music videos such as Kris Angelica's debut single "Nasaan Ka Na" (which he has also written); recording jingles and directing several television advertisements; participating in Elements Music Camp, an annual national singing and songwriting camp; performing on Evolution of Music, a birthday concert of his colleague; co-writing, performing, and directing the music video of the song "Apoy" (with Geo Ong); joining a roster of performers for promotions of commercial products and benefit concerts such as the myPhone-sponsored One Heart. One Beat. One Voice. in Smart Araneta Coliseum; and establishing his own independent video production house Dreamzone Productions. Mangubat also auditioned on The Voice of the Philippines, but he was rejected at the initial stages of the screening process.

In early 2015, Mangubat became one of the regular performers in Club Se7en in Dubai, U.A.E. He continued uploading new covers to his YouTube channel featuring his fellow club singers and musicians. After one and a half-year, he left the job and decided to return to the Philippines to try some new ventures.

=== YouTube artist ===
Mangubat created his YouTube channel on June 28, 2006. His uploaded performances on YouTube consist of both covers and original songs. They are performed either solo or in collaboration with other artists and are recorded through portable devices. Due in part to the popularity of some of his covers in his YouTube channel, he was featured on several television programs such as CgeTV In da Loop and ASAP, both broadcast on ABS-CBN. This growing online visibility also prompted him to self-produce a demo album titled Strong Inside, which includes original compositions such as "Liwanag Para Sakin", "I Hope You're Proud of Me", "Strong Inside", and "Love Alone". The album was introduced on shows like Rise and Shine broadcast on UNTV and Tambalan sa DZRH News Television.

Some of Mangubat's YouTube covers were also used by television programs: his cover of Ed Sheeran's "Thinking Out Loud" was shown on an episode of the GMA Network show Kapuso Mo, Jessica Soho; and his cover of Yeng Constantino's "Ikaw" was used on another GMA show AlDub:Tamang Panahon of Eat Bulaga.

As of November 15, 2017, Mangubat's YouTube channel has already gained a total of over 19 million number of views and over 100 thousand subscribers.

== Tawag ng Tanghalan ==
=== Daily Rounds (First Attempt) ===
On August 16, 2016, Mangubat participated in the third Quarter of Tawag ng Tanghalan (TNT) sa Showtime, a singing competition broadcast on ABS-CBN. He was introduced as a YouTube cover artist and was dubbed the "Uploaded sa Galing ng Laguna" (it was later changed to "Uploaded sa Galing ng Batangas" in his second attempt due to his transfer of residence from Laguna to Batangas). On his first performance, he delivered his rendition of "Secrets" by OneRepublic. Rey Valera, one of the judges, commented that Mangubat's voice seemed to fit better on the rock ballad genre and that it sounded "imported". Garnering an average score of 94.4% from the judges, Mangubat won against the two other contenders vying to challenge the current defending winner. On his second performance, he sang "Flying Without Wings" by Westlife for which he garnered an average score of 95.6% eventually beating the defending champion. His winning streak continued until the fifth day when he lost to the daily winner missing his slot in the semi-finals of the quarter.

Songs Performed by Sam Mangubat: First Attempt (3rd Quarter of TNT)
Performance Date	Song Performed	Original Artist	Score (%)	Result
16 August 2016	Secrets	OneRepublic	94.4	Won (as daily winner)
16 August 2016	Flying Without Wings	Westlife	95.6	Won
17 August 2016	Just The Way You Are	Bruno Mars	94.8	Won
18 August 2016	Desperado	Eagles	94.8	Won
19 August 2016	Thinking Out Loud	Ed Sheeran	92.6	Won
20 August 2016	World Of Our Own	Westlife	93.0	Lost

=== Daily Rounds (Second Attempt) ===
On November 19, 2016, Mangubat returned to the competition, already in its fourth Quarter, for another chance of being one of the semi-finalists. On his first performance, he sang "Love Runs Out" by OneRepublic. Valera commented that Mangubat got the right image, moves, energy, intelligence, and talent, but cast some doubt on whether he has grown wiser and luckier on his second attempt. Garnering an average score of 95.4%, Mangubat won the first round and became the daily winner. On his second performance, he sang "When We Were Young" by Adele where he got an average score of 96.6% eventually beating the defending champion. He won again on his second day with "Incomplete" by Backstreet Boys. On his third day, however, he made an apparent mistake with the abridged lyrics of the song "All Or Nothing" by O-Town which disappointed the judges prompting Valera to call the performance "palpak" (failure). Despite this, after looking into all considerations, the judges still ruled in favor of Mangubat. His wins continued up to the fifth day making him the third semi-finalist of the quarter. He remained the defending champion until his eighth day when he lost to the daily winner.

Songs Performed by Sam Mangubat: Second Attempt (4th Quarter of TNT)
Performance Date	Song Performed	Original Artist	Score (%)	Result
19 November 2016	Love Runs Out	OneRepublic	95.4	Won (as daily winner)
19 November 2016	When We Were Young	Adele	96.6	Won
21 November 2016	Incomplete	Backstreet Boys	93.4	Won
22 November 2016	All Or Nothing	O-Town	92.0	Won
23 November 2016	Invisible	Hunter Hayes	94.0	Won
24 November 2016	Angels	Robbie Williams	93.4	Won
25 November 2016	My Love	Westlife	92.6	Won
26 November 2016	Breakeven	The Script	93.6	Won
28 November 2016	This I Promise You	*NSYNC	93.0	Lost

=== Semi-finals ===
During the weeklong semi-finals running from February 20, 2017, to February 25, 2017, Mangubat performed songs corresponding to the theme of the day. On the fifth day, his performance of Renz Verano's "Remember Me" earned the first standing ovation of the semi-finals and much praises from the judges. On the sixth day, Mangubat, who got the highest final combined average score of 95.35% from the judges and text votes, became one of the two finalists from the fourth Quarter of the competition to enter the Grand Finals.

Songs Performed by Sam Mangubat: Semifinals (4th Quarter of TNT)
Performance Date	Theme	Song Performed	Original Artist
20 February 2017	Audition Song	Secrets	OneRepublic
21 February 2017	Fight Song	(Everything I Do) I Do It for You	Bryan Adams
22 February 2017	Awit sa Pamilya	Do I Make You Proud	Taylor Hicks
23 February 2017	Musical Influence	You Give Love A Bad Name	Bon Jovi
24 February 2017	Hurados' Choice	Remember Me	Renz Verano
25 February 2017	Awit ng Buhay	Jesus, Take the Wheel	Carrie Underwood

=== Grand Finals ===
The ten Grand Finalists were set to perform on the first five days (from March 6, 2017, to March 10, 2017) of the competition to earn a spot on the Top 5 who would then be competing for the title of Grand Winner at the "Huling Tapatan" at the Resorts World Manila. Mangubat performed "Ikaw" by Yeng Constantino on the second day for his first attempt to enter the Top 5, but he lost to Froilan Canlas after garnering only 75.35% combined average score from the judges and text votes. On his second attempt, he performed "Kilometro" by Sarah Geronimo and got a combined average score of 98.70% eventually becoming part of the Top 5.

On March 11, 2017, Mangubat competed with the five other Grand Finalists who were able to get their slots to perform at the "Huling Tapatan" at the Resorts World Manila. On the first round, he performed "Fall for You" by Secondhand Serenade. After garnering one of the three highest final combined score from text votes and judges' scores, he advanced to the second and final round where he performed a Bruno Mars' medley of "Nothin' on You", "Locked Out of Heaven", and "Treasure". He finished 2nd place garnering a combined score of 49.09%.

Songs Performed by Sam Mangubat: Grand Finals
Performance Date	Song Performed	Original Artist	Combined Score (%)
7 March 2017	Ikaw	Yeng Constantino	75.35
9 March 2017	Kilometro	Sarah Geronimo	98.70
11 March 2017	Fall For You	Secondhand Serenade	–
11 March 2017	Nothin' on You, Locked Out of Heaven, Treasure (Medley)	Bruno Mars	49.09

== Guestings and other ventures ==
Despite failing to enter the semi-finals on his first attempt in Tawag ng Tanghalan, Mangubat continued to be popular and had been requested by fans to be featured on several music venues. He appeared at One Music Ph and Wish 107.5 FM The Roadshow, where he also served as the celebrity Wish jock of the day. Some of his performances on his guestings in the Wish bus such as covers of "All Or Nothing", "Secrets", and "When We Were Young" garnered millions of views each on YouTube.

Intermittently since 2016, Mangubat, together with his three-member vocal group Dreamzone (includes Shane Tarun and Jun Sisa), has been regularly performing on various cruise ships around Asia. He has also kept uploading new performances in his YouTube channel through his Dreamzone Productions.

After Tawag ng Tanghalan, Mangubat, together with other finalists, were invited to perform on several TV shows and events (e.g. Bar 360, Laffline, Historia, mall shows and private events). He was one of the 18 artists who performed the 2017 summer station I. D. of ABS-CBN titled "Ikaw ang Sunshine Ko". Together with Marielle Montellano, he also performed the anthem of K World, a magazine show broadcast on TFC. Furthermore, together with other Tawag ng Tanghalan singers, he was inducted as an official member of Organisasyon ng mga Pilipinong Mang-aawit (OPM).

In September 2017, Mangubat officially signed a record deal with Star Music. His first released song from the label is an all-star special 2017 Christmas cover version of the song "Tell the World of His Love". The label also released his first solo single called "Pagka't Nariyan Ka" on early January 2018. He officially launched the song in It's Showtime and subsequently promoted in various F.M radio stations.

Mangubat was also invited twice on the sixth year of ASOP (A Song of Praise) Music Festival (UNTV) to serve as an interpreter. He first interpreted an original song titled "Christ" by Winston Jay Ladera during one of the weekly rounds. He again interpreted a song titled "Carry On" by Nonie Ramos, P.A. Atienza and Nino Cristobal for the Grand Finals held at Smart Araneta Coliseum. The song won the People's Choice Award after garnering the most number of online votes and YouTube views.

On February 2, 2018, he launched and hosted the online show "TNTV Now" where various music artists are featured and interviewed.

Following the loss of franchise of ABS-CBN, Mangubat joined the now-defunct musical variety show titled Sunday Noontime Live!, where he headlined a segment with Fana, Boyband PH member Niel Murillo, Zephanie and Sassa Dagdag titled Ultimate Vocal Showdown.

Television Appearances of Sam Mangubat
Year	Show	Role	Network
2012	CgeTV In Da Loop	Contestant	ABS-CBN
2013	ASAP	Guest performer	ABS-CBN
2014	Rise and Shine	Guest performer	UNTV
2016	ASOP (A Song of Praise) Music Festival	Interpreter	UNTV
2016	Tawag ng Tanghalan sa Showtime	Contestant	ABS-CBN
2017	It's Showtime	Guest performer	ABS-CBN
2017	Umagang Kay Ganda	Guest performer	ABS-CBN
2017	Magandang Buhay	Guest performer	ABS-CBN
2017	The Bottomline with Boy Abunda	Guest performer	ABS-CBN
2017	Gandang Gabi, Vice!	Guest performer	ABS-CBN
2017	ASAP	Guest performer	ABS-CBN
2017	Minute to Win It	Contestant	ABS-CBN
2018	It's Showtime	Guest performer	ABS-CBN
2018	Umagang Kay Ganda	Guest performer	ABS-CBN
2018	ASAP	Guest performer	ABS-CBN
2018	Letters and Music	Guest performer	Net 25
2018	Tonight with Boy Abunda	Guest	ABS-CBN
2020	Sunday Noontime Live!	Performer (Ultimate Vocal Showdown)	TV5

== Musical influences and artistry ==
Mangubat claimed that although he used to do voice lessons before, it was just for a while and that he is more of a self-taught singer. He cites Justin Timberlake, Jesse McCartney, Jonas Brothers, Westlife, Nick Carter, Backstreet Boys, JC Chasez, Christina Aguilera, Busted, Jojo, Lee Ryan, *NSYNC, Jay Sean, Meljohn Magno, and Melmar Magno as some of his musical influences. He also credits Bon Jovi as an influence for his showmanship when performing.

Rafael Reynante of One Music Ph described Mangubat as "timid yet unequivocally talented". He further commented on his performance of "Flying Without Wings" in Tawag ng Tanghalan that "Sam immediately commanded the stage, captivating the audience with his powerful and smooth voice, easily doing the job of the four boys of Westlife all by himself". Upon reviewing the grandfinalists of Tawag ng Tanghalan, Nestor Torre of Philippine Daily Inquirer noted that Mangubat was a standout and has the combination of looks, talent, and charisma. He said further that "he may not have won the top plum, but he has stellar prospects that his handlers should savvily polish and push to full fruition". Canadian popstar Shawn Mendes also expressed praises for Mangubat after watching his YouTube cover of "Mercy".

== Discography ==
=== Singles ===
Year	Title	Studio Album	Label
2018	Pagka't Nariyan Ka		Star Music
2018	Clueless		Star Music
2018	Wala Kang Alam	Himig Handog 2018	Star Music

== Concerts ==
=== Solo concerts ===
Year	Concert	Date	Venue	Notes
2017	16:18 Concert for a Cause	27 May 2017	Alonte Sports Arena, Biñan City	
2018	16:18 Concert for a Cause Part 2	9 June 2018	Tanauan Gymnasium 1, Tanauan City	
2018	I Am Sam	15 September 2018	Music Museum, San Juan City	Major solo concert

=== As featured artist ===
Year	Concert	Date	Venue
2014	Evolution of Music		TIU Theater, Makati City
2014	One Heart. One Beat. One Voice		Smart Araneta Coliseum, Quezon City
2017	WISHdependence Day	12 June 2017	Enchanted Kingdom, Sta. Rosa, Laguna
2017	One Music Ph Live Awit Para sa Marawi	6 August 2017	ABS-CBN studio
2017	A Song of Praise (ASOP) Music Festival Grand Finals	13 November 2017	Smart Araneta Coliseum, Quezon City
2017	The Grand Countdown to 2018: Experience the Fantasy	31 December 2017	Marriott Grand Ballroom, Resorts World Manila, Pasay
2018	TNT All Star Showdown Concert	28 July 2018	Smart Araneta Coliseum, Quezon City
2018	TNT All Star Showdown Concert	21 September 2018	Hoops Dome, Lapu-lapu City

== Awards and nominations ==
Award ceremony	Year	Category	Nominee(s)/work(s)	Result	Ref.
Push Awards	2017	Push Song Cover of the Year	"Beautiful" with (Marrielle Montellano)	Nominated	
Wish Music Awards	2017	Wish Promising Artist	"Sam Mangubat"	Won	
Himig Handog	2018	Best Interpreter	"Wala kang alam"	Won	
MOR Pinoy Music Awards	2019	Best Male Artist of the Year	"Pagkat Nariyan Ka"	Won	
34th Awit Awards	2021	Best Performance by a Male Recording Artist	"Kulang ang Mundo"	Won	
