= Joel Salinas =

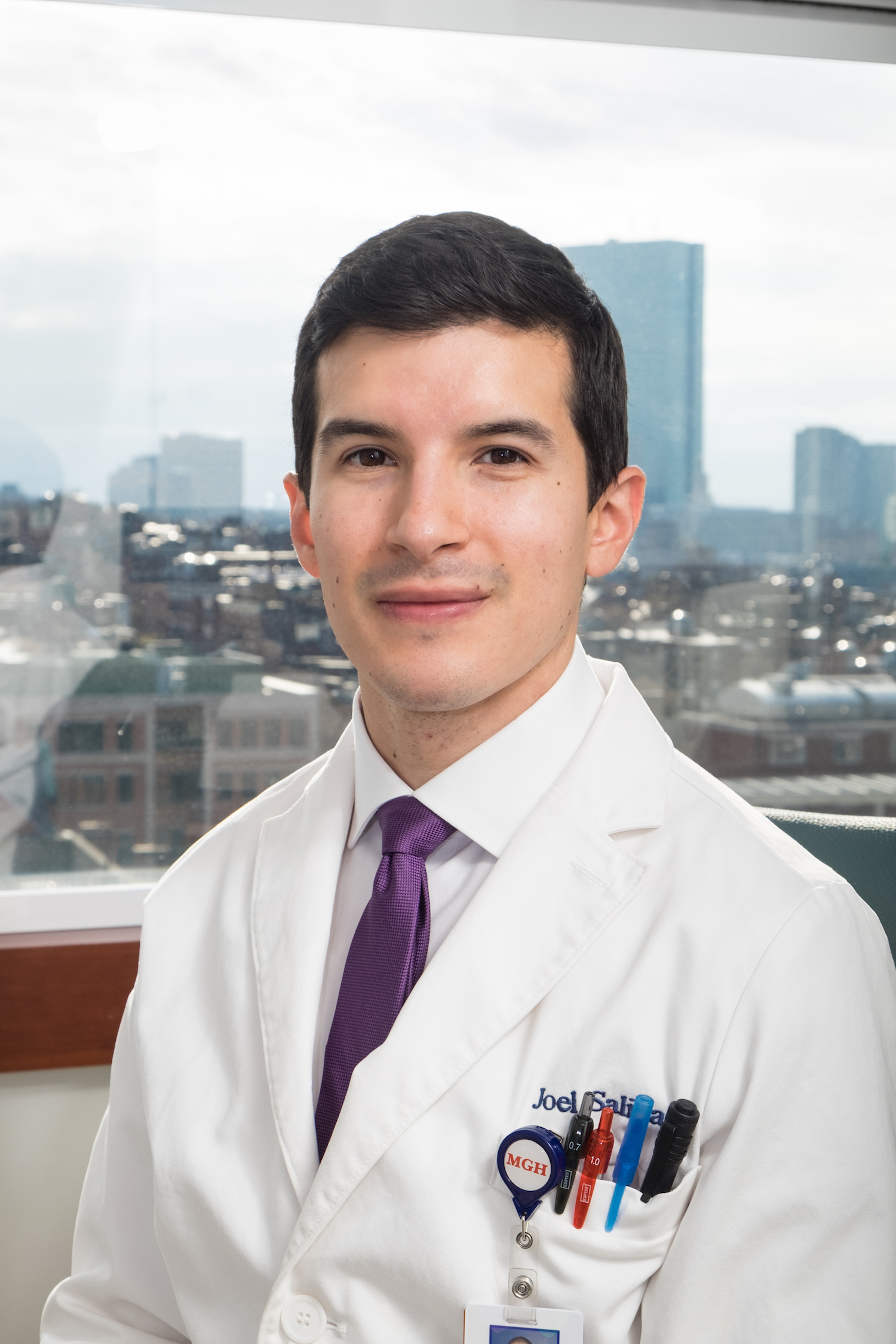
- Salinas in 2015
- Born: July 11, 1983 (age 43); Miami Beach, Florida, U.S.
- Education: Cornell University (B.A.); University of Miami Miller School of Medicine (M.D.); University of Miami Business School (MBA); Harvard T.H. Chan School of Public Health (M.Sc.)
- Occupations: Neurologist, author, scientist
- Website: joelsalinasmd.com

Joel Salinas (/səˈliːnəs/; born July 11, 1983) is an American-born Nicaraguan neurologist, author, and scientist. He is the Chief Medical Officer and co-founder of Isaac Health and an associate professor of neurology at the NYU Grossman School of Medicine. He practices general neurology with subspecialty in behavioral neurology and neuropsychiatry. Prior to NYU, he was an assistant professor of neurology at Harvard Medical School and the Massachusetts General Hospital in Boston, Massachusetts. He is also a clinician-scientist with the Framingham Study at the Boston University School of Medicine.

The subject of his 2017 book, Mirror Touch: A Memoir of Synesthesia and the Secret Life of the Brain is a collection of patient case histories and his personal experience with multiple forms of synesthesia, including mirror-touch synesthesia. In 2025, he co-authored Conflict Resilience: Negotiating Disagreement Without Giving Up or Giving In with negotiation expert Bob Bordone, which explores how neuroscience-informed strategies can help individuals successfully navigate challenging negotiations and interpersonal and societal conflict.

== Early life and education ==
Salinas was born in Miami Beach, Florida, on July 11, 1983, to Nicaraguan immigrants granted political asylum during the Contra War of the Nicaraguan Revolution. He grew up in Miami, Florida, with his younger brother and sister, though he spent a formative period in Managua, Nicaragua, after his parents declared bankruptcy under financial strain and temporarily returned to Nicaragua. He was recognized as the Miami-Dade County Student of the Year in 2000 and graduated valedictorian from Miami Southridge Senior High School in 2001.

Salinas earned his Bachelor of Arts magna cum laude in biology and society from Cornell University in 2005. While an undergraduate, he performed research in the Amazon rainforest of Pará, Brazil, studying the methyl-mercury contamination and ethnography of the Gorotire Kayapo watershed, which he described in his honors thesis dissertation on the sociocultural influences that affect people's response to health risks.

Salinas graduated with a medical degree from the University of Miami School of Medicine in 2011. In 2006, while in medical school, a tumor over his right brain was discovered. When successfully resected, the tumor was discovered to be vascular. The tumor was fortunately also benign and its invasion was isolated to destroying the overlying skull bone. From 2008 to 2009, he spent a year as a Doris Duke Clinical Research Fellow in neuropsychiatric imaging at the University of Iowa's Carver College of Medicine, where he suffered a devastating car accident. He also completed a joint MD-MBA program, earning a Master of Business Administration in Health Sector Policy and Management at the University of Miami Business School and winning the University of Miami Annual Business Plan Competition's Grand Prize.

Salinas completed his neurology residency at Harvard Medical School from 2011 to 2015, training at Massachusetts General Hospital and Brigham and Women's Hospital. He served as chief resident in neurology, followed by a fellowship in Behavioral Neurology and Neuropsychiatry at Massachusetts General Hospital. He earned a Master of Science in epidemiology at the Harvard T.H. Chan School of Public Health in 2016.

== Career ==
After completing his fellowship, Salinas joined the staff of the Massachusetts General Hospital's Neurology Department. He served as neurologist in the Cognitive Behavioral Neurology Unit and at the Institute for Brain Health, and later became the Clinical Director of the McCance Center for Brain Health. In 2020, he was appointed the Lulu P. and David J. Levidow Assistant Professor of Neurology at NYU Langone Health. In 2022, he co-founded Isaac Health where he serves as Chief Medical Officer. Isaac Health is a tech-enabled brain health platform and national telehealth service that partners with health plans and systems to identify and manage brain health and dementia-related conditions at scale.

=== Research ===
Salinas's research focuses on reducing the negative impact of stroke, dementia, and brain aging by harnessing insights gained from integrating epidemiology, social and behavioral sciences, and digital phenotyping (i.e., the moment-by-moment quantification of the individual-level human phenotype in daily life using data from smartphones and other personal digital devices).

== Bibliography ==
=== Mirror Touch ===
Mirror Touch: A Memoir of Synesthesia and the Secret Life of the Brain (2017) ISBN 978-0-062-45866-7 is a blend of intimate memoir and scientific exploration about Salinas's experience living with various types of synesthesia (including mirror-touch synesthesia), while sharing lessons about the brain and what it means to be human through personal case histories in neurodiversity.

=== Conflict Resilience ===
Conflict Resilience: Negotiating Disagreement Without Giving Up or Giving In (2025) ISBN 978-0-06-327833-2 is a collaborative work by Salinas and negotiation expert Robert C. Bordone. The book introduces the concept of "conflict resilience"—the capacity to engage constructively with disagreement. Drawing on neuroscience, behavioral research, conflict management, and negotiation strategies, the authors present a three-step framework (Name, Explore, Commit). This approach aims to transform conflict into an opportunity for growth, offering practical, negotiation-based tools to manage disagreements more skillfully in relationships, the workplace, business, and broader societal settings.

== Honors and awards ==
Salinas's awards include the American Academy of Neurology's Robert Katzman Research Training Fellowship Award in Alzheimer's and Dementia Research in 2017.

== Personal life ==
Salinas lives in New York, New York. His parents are Norma and Armando. His younger brother is Rainier and his younger sister is Scarlett.
