= Libu-Libong Buwan (Uuwian) =

Single by Kyle Raphael
- Language: Tagalog
- English title: Thousands of Months (Homecoming)
- Released: August 22, 2025
- Genre: Ballad
- Label: Viva
- Songwriter: Kyle Raphael Borbon
- Producer: Civ Fontanilla

Kyle Raphael singles chronology
"BB" (2024)	"Libu-Libong Buwan (Uuwian)" (2025)	"Kung Para Sa 'yo" (2026)

"Libu-Libong Buwan (Uuwian)" (lit. 'Thousands of Months (Homecoming)') is a song by Filipino singer-songwriter Kyle Raphael. It was released as a digital single on August 22, 2025, through Viva Records. It later achieved popularity, peaking at number five on Billboard Philippines Hot 100, Top Philippine Songs, and Official SEA Charts. The music video was released on August 31, 2025, ten days after the song's released and features Frost Sandoval and Sara Joe.

== Release ==
Since the last release of his tracks in 2024, titled "BB" and "himlay/lubay", he released his single, titled "Libu-Libong Buwan (Uuwian)", on August 22, 2025.

== Composition ==
"Libu-Libong Buwan (Uuwian)" was written by Kyle Raphael Borbon and produced by Civ Fontanilla. Gabriel Saulog of Billboard Philippines noted the song's chorus is utilized as a background for users' dramatic narratives and displays of the "kilig" aspect of their lives on the platform.

== Charts ==
Chart performance for "Libu-Libong Buwan (Uuwian)"
Chart (2026)	Peak position
Philippines (IFPI)	5
Philippines Hot 100 (Billboard Philippines)	4
Philippines Top Songs (Billboard Philippines)	4
