= Manskee =

Filipino musician

- Birth name: Manuel Francis Nascimento
- Born: January 16, 1978 (age 47)
- Origin: Philippines
- Genres: Acoustic, pop rock, alternative rock
- Occupation(s): Musician, Motoring Journalist
- Instrument(s): Vocals, guitars, percussion
- Years active: 2008–present
Manskee
- Spouse: Joy Gaerlan – Nascimento
- Children: 2
- Relatives: Michael Nascimento (brother)

Manuel Francis Nascimento (born January 16, 1978), better known in music circles as Manskee, is a Filipino independent musician and motoring journalist primarily based in Agoo, La Union in the Philippines. Nascimento's musical style is eclectic, but has been described as "Filipino surfer music," as Nascimento is also active Philippine Surfing Scene. This also gives Nascimento the distinction of being one of the few artists in the Filipino music scene arising originally from the surf community, and whose music is characterized by a "surfer vibe."

== Personal life ==
Nascimento was raised in the town of Agoo, La Union, where he took up his early studies, including High School at the College of Education Laboratory High School of the Don Mariano Marcos Memorial State University. He then took his college degree at Saint Louis University in Baguio. After a brief stint elsewhere, he eventually settled down to a life in La Union, where he married Joy Gaerlan, whom he had met in High School. He also pursued studies in culinary arts in Manila. Having developed a passion for cars, he eventually began writing for motoring magazines, and eventually came to host a motoring show for the ABS CBN News Channel.

== Musical awakening ==
While in California in August 2008, Nascimento figured in a car accident and suffered a concussion. He credits this event for having suddenly triggered his musical side. In a conversation with Philippine music journalist Ricky Lo, he said:

That same night was when I wrote my first song. I knew that day that something was absolutely different about me. Looking back at this point, I can't deny that divine intervention was involved.

== Love, Death, and Everything in Between (2010) ==
Over the course of the next year, Nascimento was able to write about 30 songs, and record thirteen of them in various makeshift studios, with help from friends like Aaron Bradley and indie artist Brandon Wall (a.k.a. Rise Over Me) in California. Nascimento eventually released these songs independently as the album Love, Death, and Everything in Between.

=== Track list ===
Tracks on the album include:

1. Heartbreaker
2. Limbo (A Love Lost)
3. What's With The World?
4. A Long Distance Affair
5. The Promise
6. Intertwined (instrumental)
7. At Fault
8. Chasing Fire
9. This High
10. Nocturnal Desire
11. The One
12. Of Stereos and Music Videos
13. The Promise (acoustic)

=== Album art ===
The album art, conceived by Nascimento, was drawn by a California-based comics artist Ramiro Montanez. Nascimento describes the album cover:

It's metaphorical in the sense that it depicts both aspects of my life; light and darkness. The rough ocean represents the turmoil I've experienced while the sky and clouds represent the better parts of my life.

=== Reception ===
Nascimento's efforts to market the songs caught the attention of indie film director Brian Patrick Lim, who in early 2009 asked him to come up with the main theme for the upcoming film "Chasing Fire". It also caught the attention of Francis Reyes, who in July 2010 invited Nascimento to guest at his NU107 radio program in the Raw, exposing Nascimento's music to a mainstream audience for the first time and eventually leading to heavier radio airplay, particularly for the track "Nocturnal Desire".

== Caught in the Tide (unreleased) ==
In 2013, press reports indicated that Manskee was working on a second album, Caught in the Tide with multi-awarded musician, sound engineer and producer Pat Tirano.

A music video for "Sea of Stars," was directed by Jako de Leon. The video was shot in Nascimento's native province of La Union and featured local internet celebrity Bogart The Explorer and a virtual who's-who of the Philippine surfing scene, including personalities like Luke Landrigan, Paolo Soler, and Lorraine Hilario.

In October 2013, Manskee was among the performers at the 2013 Philippine Ukulele Festival.

On January 22, 2014, listeners voted another song "Midlife Crisis" into the regular playlist or Manila radio station Jam 88.3, which meant that one of the songs from Caught in the Tide would be on a regular mainstream radio playlist even before the album release.
