= Nityalila =

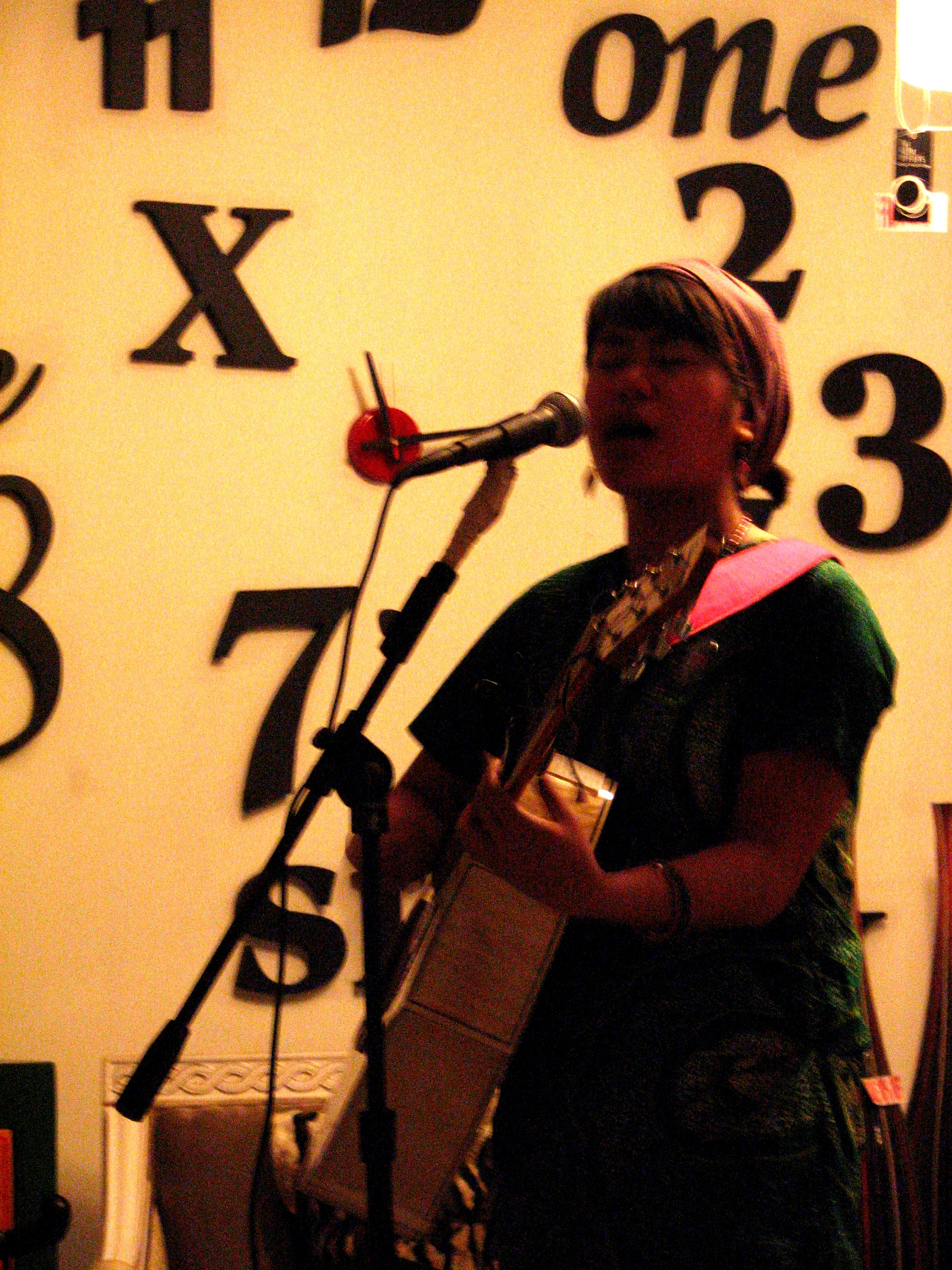

Background information
- Origin: Philippines
- Genres: Indie
- Years active: 2001 – Present

Nityalila Saulo, known mononymously as Nityalila, is a Filipino musician, artist and activist.

== Biography ==
Nityalila is the daughter of owner and proprietor of Khumbmela & Yadu bags, Edwin "Yadu" Saulo. She and her family and their business was affected by the 2002 storm Milenyo.

Nityalila is also the name of her band which is described as blending classical Indian with Filipino folk music. The band consists of Miko Aguilar on bass, Sandy Baliong on drums, Tim Cada on guitars, Vaishnava on percussions. In its seven years of existence, the group has performed regularly in both local and international stages that supports their advocacies, such as Fete Dela Musique, Arts and Music Festival, Earth Day Jam, Sunrise Music Festival, Peace Camp Concert, UP Fair, NU107 Concert Series, Jam88.3 Concert Series, Cultural Center of the Philippines Concert Series, The Taiwan Yoga Festival, The 1st Bitan Music Festival in Bitan Taiwan, and The 2009 Migration Music Festival in Chiayi County and Taipei Taiwan and at the 2010 Tainan International Arts Festival.

The group has produced three original albums released in 2003 by Nityalila in partnership with Rock Radio Cafe, “Uno Jornal” released in 2005, Bagani Music, and “Ako’y Isang Pinay”, released in 2007 by Manna Records in partnership with Universal Records. Nityalila Saulo was part of JAM88.3's “Not Another Christmas Album” released in 2006 by EMI Music Philippines.

Nityalila was nominated Best Performance by a New Female Recording Artist at the 2008 Awit Awards, by PARI (The Philippine Association of the Record Industry, Inc.), that gives recognition to Filipino performing artists and people behind the making of Filipino recorded music.

She is an active member of Dakila a collective of Filipino artists, musicians, and students that believe that the Philippine society is in need of change. A member of Yabang Pinoy, a campaign that hopes to unite people to support Filipino products, themselves and fellow Filipinos. Nityalila is the founder and producer of Flippyknows, a community where Filipinos all over the world converge to share creativity and technology with each other.

In 2016 she moved to the United States and appreciated the LBGTQ+ community. After that she ended a heterosexual relationship and came out to friends and family.

In 2018, Saulo designed a mural in San Francisco focused on climate change activism as part of the Rise for Climate campaign. It was 2,000 footsteps surrounding the word "Live".

In October 2020, the Philippine government gifted Saulo's digital artwork featuring the German word, “Einheit” or unity, written in the indigenous Filipino script of Baybayin to the German Federal Foreign Office for the reunification anniversary.

She has led and been a spokesperson for many activist causes including: climate change walks, World Food Day, regular-metered taxi choice, and anti-slavery bike rides.

== Albums ==
- Neknekmo Live Sessions, 3tracks (Bootleg) (2001)
- Uno Jornal, 5 tracks (EP) (2003)
- Ako'y Isang Pinay, 13 tracks , featuring a revival of "Ako'y Isang Pinoy" by Florante (May 30, 2007), Manna Records
