= Keno (singer) =

- Also known as: JFSanchez, J. Wolf Sanchez
- Born: Joaquin Francisco Sanchez; June 16, 1962 (age 64)
- Origin: Manila, Philippines
- Genres: OPM, pop
- Occupations: Singer, actor, host, author, crisis counselor
- Years active: 1986–1991
- Labels: Dyna Music; OctoArts-EMI Music Inc.

Joaquin Francisco Sanchez (born June 16, 1962), more commonly known as Keno, is a Filipino writer and former singer and actor. He was popular from the late 1980s until 1991.

As a singer, he popularized songs such as "A Friend", "Leaving Yesterday Behind", “Once Again”, "On Wings of a Dream", "Want You to Cry Too", "Why Do I Love You", and "Wish".

As an actor, Keno was in the cast of a teen-oriented action film, Ninja Kids, playing the Yellow Ninja, in 1986.

As an author, he published The Last Castrato in 2005, with I.M. Wolf Publishing.

As in his song, Keno "left yesterday behind", leaving admirers and fans with much music and a children's movie.

== Life and career ==
He graduated from secondary school at Notre Dame of Greater Manila, Class of 1978. He studied at University of the Philippines Diliman. He continued his education at the New York Institute of Technology, graduating summa cum laude with Bachelors in Behavioral Science degree.

Keno started his music career in opera but switched to popular music. He entered the Philippines' music industry in the late 1980s. At that time, he was heralded as an heir to the niche that singers Martin Nievera and Gary Valenciano had made for themselves.

In 1986, he released his version of the classic Filipino love song "Leaving Yesterday Behind", which won a gold record award.

When the song became a national hit, Viva Films cast Keno as one of the ninjas in Ninja Kids. His song, "Leaving Yesterday Behind", was the love theme; he was mistakenly associated with one of those who performed the main theme, the new wave-sounding song, You've Got the Power. The song was actually performed by Triple Treat, which is composed of Randy Santiago, Gino Padilla and himself. But he was replaced by Juan Miguel Salvador, because the Dyna studio would not allow him to record the song. Ninja Kids was Keno's first and only film, despite Viva Films' other offers.

Keno came out with four albums. "A Friend" was the most requested song on Philippines radio in 1990. A media icon for Pepsi-Cola in those years, he was part of the Pepsi New Generation artists that helped launch the careers of several other artists, such as JoAnne Lorenzana, Timmy Cruz, Raymond Lauchengco and Gino Padilla.

As ALIW's most promising entertainer of the year in 1987, Keno was an advocate and board member of the fledgling Organisasyon ng Pilipinong Mang-aawit (OPM), the official association of Filipino singers. Keno was also a host of GMA Network's Lunch Date from 1986 until the early 1990s with Randy Santiago, Lito Pimentel, Willie Revillame, Fe Delos Reyes, Toni Rose Gayda, and Chique Hollman-Yulo, which rivaled the then popular Eat Bulaga!. He discovered and mentored comedian Arnel Ignacio.

== Retirement from the music industry ==
Keno retired from showbusiness following a successful major concert at the ULTRA stadium in 1991. He then took up writing and released articles under the byline JFSanchez. He also released a book titled The Last Castrato under the name J. Wolf Sanchez.

== Personal life ==
Keno moved to DeLand, Florida following his retirement from showbusiness. He studied at the University of Central Florida and works as a crisis counselor in an in-patient psychiatric facility. He is married to Eleanore Sanchez, with whom he has a son and a daughter.

== Filmography ==
=== Film ===
- Ninja Kids (1986)

=== Television ===
- Triple Treat (1986–1987)
- Lunch Date (1987–1994)
- That's Entertainment (1988–1994)
- Straight to the Heart (1992)

== Discography ==
=== Studio albums ===
- Keno: Leaving Yesterday Behind, Dyna Music (LP, CD, Cassette 1986)
- Beyond Limits, Dyna Music (LP, CD, Cassette 1987)
- A New Beginning, PolyEast Records formerly OctoArts International (LP, CD, Cassette 1989/1990)
- Keno: Whenever You Need Me, PolyEast Records formerly OctoArts International (LP, CD, Cassette 1992)

=== Compilations albums ===
- The Best of Keno, Dyna Music (CD, Cassette, Digital Download 1993)

== Collaborations ==
- OPM Hit Series, PolyEast Records formerly OctoArts International (CD, Cassette, Digital Download 1990)
- OPM Hit Series 2, PolyEast Records formerly OctoArts International (CD, Cassette, Digital Download 1990)
- Maligayang Pasko sa Inyong Lahat, PolyEast Records former OctoArts International (LP, CD, Cassette, Digital Download 1990)
- OPM Mega Hits, PolyEast Records formerly OctoArts International (CD, Cassette, Digital Download 1992)

== Selected singles ==
- "Leaving Yesterday Behind"
- "Want You to Cry Too"
- "A Friend"
- "Once Again"
- "What Are You Doing Christmas Eve?" (cover)
- "Never Again"
- "Color Me Lonely"
- "Araw ng Pasko" (cover of a song by Boyfriends); also duet with Carlo Orosa
- "Whenever You Need Me"
- "Ikaw Na Nga Ba"
- "Together Forever" (cover of a song by Rico J. Puno)
