= Ram Chaves =

- Birth name: Ramon Chaves III
- Born: 1983 (age 41–42)
- Origin: Cagayan de Oro, Philippines
- Genres: OPM, alternative rock, soft rock, indie rock
- Occupation(s): Vocalist, musician
- Years active: 2008–present
- Labels: GMA Records

Ramon "Ram" Chaves III (born 1983) is best known for joining the first season of Pinoy Idol from GMA Network where he managed to finish as the second runner up.

He may end up as third placer, but he still got a management contract from GMA Network, along with Jayann Bautista and Pinoy Idol winner Gretchen Espina.

== Early life ==
He was born in 1983 in Cagayan de Oro, Chaves graduated in high school in Cagayan de Oro in Xavier University, a Jesuit-owned university in March 1999.

Theirs was the last batch when XUHS was strictly an all-male institution.

Chaves joined his dad in Dubai after finishing his BS Business Management course at Xavier University in 2003. His father is a limousine driver there at Burj al-arab, the hotel famous for its distinctive dhow shape.

A year later, Chaves returned to Manila where he worked as a call center agent.

Before joining Pinoy Idol, he used to be a vocalist of a rock band.

== Personal life ==
He is married to longtime girlfriend, with his son Ramon Chaves IV. He is son of Ramon Chaves, Jr. with his grandfather Ramon Chaves, Sr..

== Pinoy Idol ==
Chaves auditioned in the SMX Convention Center in SM Mall of Asia in Pasay, Philippines. His reason for joining in the said competition was to give a shot for stardom and take his original songs and singing to a new level.

He was in the bottom group twice in the whole competition including the semi-final round where they were still 24 hopefuls. He still managed to be in the finale along with Jayann Bautista and Gretchen Espina but he lost his chance to Espina, leaving Bautista as the 1st runner up.

=== Pinoy Idol performances ===
| Week | Theme | Song Choice | Original Artist | Result |
| Semi-finals 1 | Contestant's Choice | "My Hero" | Foo Fighters | Safe |
| Semi-finals 2 | Hit Songs From Year of Birth | "Boys Don't Cry" | The Cure | Bottom 4 |
| Semi-finals 3 | Greatest Musical Influences | "Kung Ayaw Mo, Wag Mo" | Rivermaya | Safe |
| Semi-finals 4 | Songs For Fathers | "My Sacrifice" | Creed | Safe |
| Top 12 | Songs From Their Greatest Pre-Idol Performances | "With Arms Wide Open" | Creed | Safe |
| Top 11 | Song Dedications | "Banal na Aso, Santong Kabayo" | Yano | Safe |
| Top 10 | Songs of Their Lives | "Yugyugan Na" | P. O. T. | Safe |
| Top 9 | Regine Velasquez | "Tuwing Umuulan at Kapiling Ka" | Basil Valdez | Safe |
| Top 8 | Jaya | "Honesty" | Billy Joel | Bottom 3 |
| Top 7 | OPM Bands' Songs | "Sandalan" | 6 Cycle Mind | Safe |
| Top 6 | Basil Valdez | "Ngayon at Kailanman" | Basil Valdez | Safe |
| Top 5 | Greatest Idol Performances | "Bahay Yugyugan" | Francis Magalona | Safe |
| Top 3 | Judge's Choice: Ogie Alcasid; Jaya's Choice; Contestant's Choice | "Bridge Over Troubled Water" "I Don't Want to Miss a Thing" "Handog" | Simon & Garfunkel; Aerosmith; Florante | Eliminated |

=== Pinoy Idol finale ===
The finale was described as a competition among the Philippines' three major island groups, with Espina representing Visayas while runners-up Jayann Bautista of Pampanga Province representing Luzon and Ram Chaves of Cagayan de Oro representing Mindanao.

=== Post Pinoy Idol ===
Chaves performed the theme song of Sine Novela's Una Kang Naging Akin starring Maxene Magalona, Wendell Ramos and Angelika dela Cruz.

Mae Flores, who finished 11th in Pinoy Idol also had the chance same as Chaves. She performed the theme song of "Dapat Ka Bang Mahalin?" having the same title (originally performed by Sharon Cuneta). It stars Aljur Abrenica, Kris Bernal.

== Ram Chaves Band ==
Chaves and his band mates have recently released their album called Sutil.

The Ram Chaves Band already existed even before Chaves joined Pinoy Idol. The band have already pure original songs that are enough to have two albums.

Ram Chaves Band, formerly known as Sutil Band, eventually had some changes when it comes to members. Their debut album Sutil consists of 12 original songs including their carrier single "Kol Center" which was written by Chaves, himself. It was created four years ago while Chaves was in call center.

Another song from the album is entitled "Hiwaga" that is gaining popularity among radio listeners.

Chaves also joined Talentadong Pinoy on TV5, along with the band called NOY Band.

He also became the frontman of pop band Let Gravity and currently to the band Ram & Chasing Days.
