= Gretchen Espina =

Filipino singer

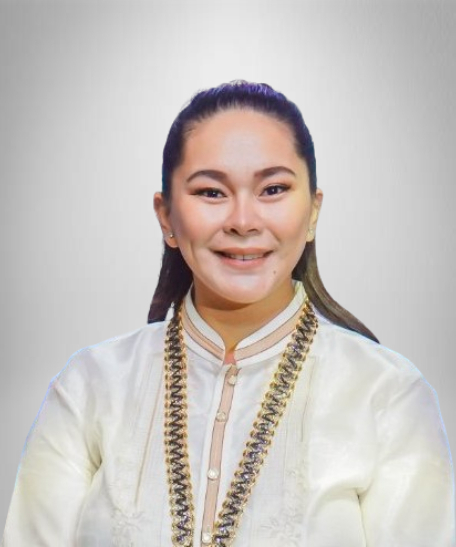
- Official portrait, 2022

Mayor of Naval, Biliran
- Incumbent
- Assumed office June 30, 2022
- Preceded by: Gerard Roger M. Espina

Personal details
- Born: Gretchen Stephanie Mendiola Espina; January 8, 1988 (age 38) Quezon City, Philippines
- Musical career
- Genres: Pop, OPM
- Occupations: Singer, politician
- Instrument: Vocals
- Years active: 2008–2011, 2026–present
- Label: Sony Music Philippines

Gretchen Stephanie Mendiola Espina (born January 8, 1988, in Quezon City, Philippines) is a Filipino singer and politician who rose to notability after winning Pinoy Idol, an interactive reality-based singing competition. Although she is credited as the first Pinoy Idol, Espina is technically the second winner of a Philippine Idol franchise, after Mau Marcelo of Philippine Idol in 2006. She came from the political family of Espinas of Biliran. Her father Rogelio Espina, is a former governor and the current representative of the lone district of Biliran, while her grandfather Gerardo Espina, Sr. is a former representative and mayor of Naval, Biliran and her uncle Gerardo Espina, Jr is a former representative and current governor of Biliran.

== Biography ==
=== Early life ===
Espina came from a musically inclined family who is also the prominent political family in Biliran, with her father, Congressman Dr. Rogelio "Roger" J. Espina, Representative of the Lone District of Biliran, described as a "good piano player and singer." Her mother, Cecil, works as a pediatrician; while her grandfather, Gerry, was a Mayor of Kawayan, Biliran. Her uncle, Gerry (Gerryboy) Espina Jr. is the present Governor of Biliran.

Espina was born in Quezon City, Metro Manila, where she spent her early years studying in School of the Holy Spirit before transferring to Naval Central School where she finished elementary level with honors. She had her secondary education in Cathedral School of La Naval, where she graduated as a salutatorian.

Espina pursued college in University of the Philippines Diliman campus in Quezon City, with a major in European Languages. She is a member of The University of the Philippines Singing Ambassadors and represented UP in the Inter-Collegiate Singing Contest held in Shantou University, Guangdong, China, where she won the first prize as a solo performer.

=== 2006: Philippine Idol ===
She was in Philippine Idol's top 40, but was cut from getting into the top 24.

=== 2008: Pinoy Idol ===
Espina auditioned in SM Mall of Asia. This was despite her parents' disapproval of her auditioning because they wanted her to finish college first. News about Espina included was among 179 aspirants who passed the auditions was passed around in Biliran through SMS. She was never among the finalists with the lowest number of votes, also known as "The Bottom Group", during the competition. The finale was described as a competition among the Philippines' three major island groups, with Espina representing Visayas while runners-up Jayann Bautista of Pampanga representing Luzon and Ram Chaves of Cagayan de Oro representing Mindanao. After her win, she revealed that she would give P100,000 (roughly US$2,000) to each of her two runners-up as part of their agreement. She was slated to record her first single under Sony-BMG Philippines with "To You", the Pinoy Idol coronation song.

==== Pinoy Idol performances ====
Week	Theme	Song Choice	Original Artist	Result
Semi-finals 1	Contestant's Choice	"Neither One of Us (Wants to Be the First to Say Goodbye)"	Gladys Knight & the Pips	Safe
Semi-finals 2	Hit Songs From Year of Birth	"The Way You Make Me Feel"	Michael Jackson	Safe
Semi-finals 3	Greatest Musical Influences	"Wala Na Bang Pag-Ibig"	Jaya	Safe
Semi-finals 4	Songs For Fathers	"Try It on My Own"	Whitney Houston	Safe
Top 12	Songs From Their Greatest Pre-Idol Performances	"Respect"	Aretha Franklin	Safe
Top 11	Song Dedications	"A House Is Not a Home"	Dionne Warwick	Safe
Top 10	Songs of Their Lives	"Follow Your Road"	Pauline Wilson	Safe
Top 9	Regine Velasquez	"Kung Maibabalik Ko Lang"	Regine Velasquez	Safe
Top 8	Jaya	"You Lift Me Up"	Jaya	Safe
Top 7	OPM Bands' Songs	"Ikaw Lang Ang Aking Mahal"	Brownman Revival	Safe
Top 6	Basil Valdez	"Gaano Kadalas Ang Minsan"	Basil Valdez	Safe
Top 5	Greatest Idol Performances	"I'm Here"	Fantasia Barrino	Safe
Top 3	Judges' Choice	"For Your Eyes Only"	Sheena Easton	Safe
Top 3	Jaya's Choice	"Stand Up for Love"	Destiny's Child	Safe
Top 3	Contestant's Choice	"Ngayon"	Basil Valdez	Safe
Top 2	Idol's Single	"To You"	Gretchen Espina	Winner

=== 2009: Shining Through ===
On June 19, 2009, she was re-introduced after months of being away from the limelight due to a throat ailment she had gotten during her stint in Pinoy Idol last year, in the 59th Anniversary Celebration of GMA Network held at the Araneta Coliseum singing medley of songs. On July 5, 2009, she was welcomed as a new regular performer and co-host of the musical variety show SOP Rules.

Espina's debut album entitled Shining Through was released on August 4, 2009, by Sony Music Philippines and 19 Recordings with the carrier single entitled "Kasalanan Nga Ba?", originally sung and owned by Thor which is the theme song of the drama series Sine Novela: Tinik Sa Dibdib. The album also includes "To You", her "victory song" of Pinoy Idol.

In 2010, Espina made her first acting debut in Diva as Debbie Romasanta, Tiffany's (Glaiza de Castro) best friend and personal assistant who helps her to make Sam/Melody's (Regine Velasquez) life miserable.

== Political career ==
In May 2022, she was elected as the new Mayor of Naval, Biliran.

== Electoral history ==
Electoral history of Gretchen Espina
Year	Office	Party	Votes received				Result
Year	Office	Party	Total	%	P.	Swing	Result
2022	Mayor of Naval, Biliran	Nacionalista	19,994	100.00%	1st	—N/a	Unopposed
2025	Mayor of Naval, Biliran	Nacionalista	21,541	90.13%	1st	-9.87	Won

== Discography ==
- 2009: Shining Through

== Tour ==
- 2008: Ogie Sings with the Idols

== Filmography ==
=== Television ===
Years	Title	Role	Network
2008	Pinoy Idol	Herself (Winner)	GMA Network
2009	SOP	Herself	GMA Network
2010	Diva	Debbie Romasanta	GMA Network
2010	Take Me Out	Herself	GMA Network
2011–2013	Party Pilipinas	Herself/Performer	GMA Network
2011	I Heart You, Pare!	Mimay	GMA Network
2011	Sinner or Saint	Sarah	GMA Network
2012	My Beloved	Joy's friend	GMA Network
2012	Pahiram ng Sandali	Lindsay	GMA Network
2012	Robinhood (musical play)	Skarlet	Treehouse Company
2013	ASOP	Herself/Grand Finalist	
2013	Son's of Egypt (musical play)	Hatchepsut	Treehouse Company
2013–present	Doctor's on TV	Herself/Host	UNTV
2014	Russian Princess: Anastasia	Anastasia	Treehouse Company
2014	Apat Na Dalaga (musical play)	Jasmine Laxamana	Stairs Theater Company
2015	Yexien (musical play)	Houma	TreeHouse Theatre Company

== Awards and nominations ==
Year	Award	Category	Result
2010	Awit Awards	Best Performance by a New Female Recording Artist for Kasalanan Nga Ba?	Won
2010	Awit Awards	Best R&B for Kasalanan Nga Ba? (R&B Version)	Nominated
2010	PMPC Star Awards for Music	New Female Recording Artist of the Year	Nominated
