= Mirror-touch synesthesia =

Rare neurological condition

Mirror-touch synesthesia is a rare condition which causes individuals to experience a similar sensation in the same part or opposite part of the body (such as touch) that another person feels. For example, if someone with this condition were to observe someone touching their cheek, they would feel the same sensation on their own cheek. Synesthesia, in general, is described as a condition in which a concept or sensation causes an individual to experience an additional sensation or concept. Synesthesia is usually a developmental condition; however, recent research has shown that mirror-touch synesthesia can be acquired after sensory loss following amputation.

The severity of the condition varies from person to person. Some individuals have intense physical synesthetic responses to any physical touch they see, while others describe their experiences as feeling an "echo" of the touch that they see. This appears to be comparable to the projective versus associative distinctions found in other forms of synesthesia. In addition, some mirror-touch synesthetes feel the phenomenon only in response to other humans being touched, while others also perceive it when animals or even inanimate objects are being touched.

Mirror-touch synesthesia is found in approximately 1.6–2.5% of the general population. Mirror-touch synesthesia may also co-occur with autism.

Some research suggests that mirror-touch synesthetes have higher levels of affective and pain empathy than those without the condition, though cognitive empathy differs from person to person. Their emotional experience of the observed touch may differ from the emotional experience of the person being touched—somebody may perceive a pleasant touch as unpleasant or vice versa. However, other research fails to find evidence of heightened empathy in mirror-touch synesthetes.

== Introduction ==
Three conditions must be met in order to confirm the presence of mirror-touch synesthesia:

1. The synesthetic response, which is defined as the sensation synesthetes feel after observing someone else being touched, should feel like conscious experiences.
2. Synesthetic responses have to be induced by a stimulus that normally does not induce that response.
3. The synesthetic experiences must occur automatically, without conscious thought.

In order to examine the prevalence of this condition, a study was conducted at the University College London and University of Sussex. 567 undergraduate participants were recruited and given a questionnaire. From the questionnaire, it was determined that approximately 1.5% of the population experienced mirror-touch synesthesia symptoms. Further studies have shown the prevalence to be 1.6%, meaning that this condition is one of the more common types of synesthesia, along with grapheme-color synesthesia (1.4%) and day-color synesthesia (2.8%). At the moment it is believed that there are two subtypes of the condition. The first type causes a person to feel sensations on the part of their body that mirrors the observed touch. The second type causes a person to feel sensations on the same side of their body as the observed touch.

Studies have attempted to more explicitly define the intensity of synesthetic responses. In most studies, participants are asked to observe someone else being touched and report what kind of synesthetic response they experience. In one particular instance, video clips were used to show different types of observed touch. The intensity of the synesthetic touch is not affected by the location of the observed touch (arm, leg, hand, etc.); however, it is sometimes affected by the spatial orientation of the observed touch. When crossed hands are touched, the hands become uncrossed in the perception of synesthetes. However, when the observed hand is upside down, the observed touch does not get rotated. Intensity is also not affected if the observed act consists of someone touching themselves, versus someone touching them. Additionally, the type of object doing the touching has a significant effect on the intensity of the response. If a finger or knife tip is used, a much higher intensity is experienced than if a feather is used. Finally, watching a dummy being touched decreases the intensity of the observed touch significantly. For this reason, it is suspected that in order to experience a synesthetic touch, synesthetes must observe somebody who is capable of feeling sensations.

Mirror-touch responses are not limited to feeling touch. Mirror-touch synesthetes have a higher ability to feel empathy than non-synesthetes, and can therefore feel the same emotions that someone else may be observed to feel. Additionally, some individuals experience pain when observing someone else in pain, and this is a condition usually developed from birth. Approximately 30% of the normal population experience some form of this condition and around 16% of amputees report synesthetic pain after an amputation. This condition can either be acquired or developed. In the congenital condition, synesthetes experience pain in the same location as the observed pain; however, in the acquired condition, high intensity pain is felt at the same location as the trauma.

== Reported cases ==
The first reported case of mirror-touch synesthesia occurred in 2004 in a patient called C. When observing someone else being touched, she would also experience the same touch on her body. Although she had experienced this sensation for her whole life, she did not realize that it was abnormal until reporting it to someone else. She was an otherwise healthy individual. After realizing that her perception was abnormal, she realized that her first cousin, also a female, also has mirror-touch synesthesia, suggesting that it could be genetic.

=== Acquired cases ===
A male patient named D.N. suffered a stroke and experienced paralysis along with loss of sensation on the left side of his body. If stimuli were hidden from his view, he could feel no sensation. However, when he could visualize stimuli, he would be able to feel it. Even if D.N. believed that he was being touched, he would feel the stimuli. An experiment was conducted on him where he watched a video of his left arm being touched and was told that it was a real time video of his left arm being touched. Although nobody actually touched him, D.N. still experienced sensations where he saw his arm being stimulated in the video.

It has been suggested that symptoms of mirror-touch synesthesia can occur in amputees. 98% of amputees report phantom sensations in their amputated limb, and one of the studied treatments for phantom limb pain has involved a mirror box. In this treatment, the amputee places their good arm into a mirror box, allowing the image of the arm to reflect where the amputated arm normally would be. When touch is applied to the good arm, amputees have reported corresponding sensations in their phantom limb. These cases can be considered mirror-touch synesthesia because a visual stimulus was able to elicit a tactile sensation. Studies have looked further into determining whether amputees actually experience mirror-touch synesthesia. Four amputees were recruited in a study and asked to observe an assistant's arm being touched at various angles. 61 out of the 64 trials experienced mirror-touch sensations, and when the arm was wiggled, they enhanced the sensations. Finally, one amputee experienced a cold sensation when observing ice cubes touching the assistant's arm. Although there is evidence that mirror-touch synesthesia occurs in amputees, recent data has been inconclusive.

== Possible mechanisms ==
=== Non-synesthetic subjects ===
In most people, several parts of the brain are activated when observing touch, particularly in the motor system. Mirror neurons play a role in helping perceive action. Studies in monkeys have shown that mirror neurons in the ventral premotor cortex fire both when monkeys perform tasks and when monkeys see other monkeys performing the same task. Although the discovery of mirror neurons was made in monkeys recent studies have suggested that a similar mirror system functions in humans. Furthermore, it has been shown that the mirror system is selective only for biological actions. When observing another human grasping an object, there is an increase in premotor cortex activation. However, when seeing a robot grasping an object, there is no such increase.

The following is a list of regions where increased activation was seen:

- Premotor cortex
- Insular cortex
- Superior temporal sulcus
- Fusiform gyrus
- Bilateral S1
- Bilateral S2

The fusiform gyrus, bilateral SI and SII, premotor cortex, and superior temporal sulcus is generally activated when observing touch to another person's head or neck. In particular, the visual presentation of faces activates the fusiform gyrus and superior temporal sulcus. As in the premotor cortex, activation in these areas is higher when observing biological actions, or actions performed by another human. Activation in S1 was organized somatotopically, meaning organized according to which part of the body was being touched. Finally, when observing touch to the left side of a human face or neck, the right SI is activated, and when observing touch to the right side of a human face or neck, the left SI is activated.

=== In mirror-touch synesthetes ===
There are three main theories for the presence of mirror-touch synesthesia. The first theory states that the somatosensory mirror system, which modulates observed touch and felt touch, has activations that are below a particular threshold in normal people. When the activations are below this threshold, a person can perceive and understand the observed touch. It is suggested that mirror-touch synesthesia occurs when this threshold is exceeded. This results in synesthetes believing that the touch actually occurs on their own body. Most data support this theory. In general, activations in SI and SII are significantly higher in synesthetes than in non-synesthetes. There is also a significantly higher activation in the premotor cortex. It is also suspected that there is an area of the brain that is only activated in mirror-touch synesthetes when observing touch, but not in non-synesthetes. Studies have shown that the anterior insula is actuated in mirror-touch synesthetes, but it is not activated in non-synesthetes, when observing touch. The anterior insula is believed to mediate the conscious perception of touch and is involved with self-processing.

The second theory proposes that the visual and somatosensory system in people with mirror-touch synesthesia are directly connected in such a way that is unique to these synesthetes. If this is true, then it would not be accurate to say that the same mechanisms involved in mirror-touch synesthesia are utilized in non-synesthetes. The third theory involves bimodal cells in the parietal cortex, specifically in the intraparietal sulcus. It is suggested that, when observing touch, bimodal cells for visual and tactile stimuli are activated above a certain threshold.

== Verifying its presence in research studies ==
Most studies on mirror-touch synesthesia verify the existence of the condition through a variety of methods. One way is through a sensory interference task. In these tasks, participants are touched on their left cheek, right cheek, or not at all, and asked to observe an assistant being touched. In congruent studies, the assistant is touched at the same location that the participant is touched. In incongruent studies, the participants are touched in areas different from those of the assistant. Subjects are then asked to report where they feel the sensation. For some participants, if the observed touch occurs on the right cheek, they feel a synesthetic touch on their left cheek, and this is called specular correspondence. If the synesthetic touch is felt on their right cheek, it is called anatomical correspondence. Most instances of mirror-touch synesthesia include specular correspondence. The rate of errors is calculated, and it is expected that a higher rate of error should occur in synesthetic subjects in comparison to non-synesthetic subjects.

== Link to empathy ==
Studies have hypothesized that a process of simulation may be responsible for the experience of empathy. When we see someone feeling happy, the same neural circuits used to make them feel happy are activated in our brain. Since mirror-touch synesthetes have heightened activation of mirror systems, it seemed likely that they would also experience higher empathy, and this has been confirmed. Mirror-touch synesthetes experience more empathy than non-synesthetes. This was determined using the empathy quotient, which has three main scales: cognitive empathy, emotional reactivity, and social skills. Mirror-touch synesthetes showed significantly higher empathy quotient scores in emotional reactivity than in controls. However synesthetes did not show higher scores in cognitive empathy and social skills. Thus empathy is multifaceted, and the tactile mirror system may not be fully responsible for the ability to empathize.

Other ways of investigating the role of the mirror neuron system in empathy have been through pain and disgust. With regard to pain, when painful stimuli are applied to subjects' hands, neurons in the anterior cingulate cortex fired. Similarly, when observing painful stimuli being applied to someone else's hands, the same neurons fired. The anterior cingulate cortex was also activated when observing people who would be painfully stimulated at a later time. Therefore, brain areas responsible for responding to pain are activated while experiencing pain, observing someone else experience pain, and observing someone else who would experience pain at a later point. The insula, which is activated after a person experiences disgust, is also activated when observing faces expressing disgust, and the intensity of the interaction is directly proportional to the level of disgust on the observed face. Finally, the inability to experience emotions leads to impairment of the ability to recognize the same emotions in others. Patients with brain injuries preventing them from experiencing disgust couldn't recognize disgust in the faces of others.
