= Vernie Varga =

Filipino actress and singer (born 1958)

- Born: Ignacia Mabugat; October 23, 1958 (age 67)
- Occupations: singer; actress
- Years active: 1982 - 2017
- Spouse: Ricardo Oledan (m. 1995)
- Musical career
- Genres: Jazz; Pop; OPM; Soul
- Instrument: Vocals
- Labels: Vicor Music Corporation; Dyna Music

Ignacia Mabugat (born October 23, 1958) was a Filipino singer and actress. She was known in the Philippine Music Industry as "The Vamp". She was also tagged as "The Queen of Corporate Shows" and "Philippine Jazz Diva".

== Personal life ==
Ignacia Mabugat, who will later be known as Vernie Varga, is from Bantayan Island, Cebu. Verni's family moved from Bantayan to Manila when she was still at a very young age.

She became inactive by 2017, reportedly due to early onset Alzheimer's disease.

== Filmography ==
- Blue Jeans Gang (1992)
- Paikot-ikot (1990)

== Discography ==
=== Albums ===
List of albums
| Title | Album details | Tracklist |
|---|---|---|
| I'm Me Vernie | Released: 1983; Label: Vicor Music Corporation; Formats: Vinyl (LP), Cassette and Digital Streaming Platform | 1. I'm Me; 2. All I Need; 3. Just For You; 4. Where Are You Now; 5. Gone Are The Days; 6. A Little Kiss, A Little Hug; 7. Love Me Again; 8. Soft Dancing; 9. Hey, Lover; 10. Number One |
| Varga | Released: April 03, 1993; Label: Dypro Records; Formats: Cassette, Compact Disc (CD) and Digital Streaming Platform | 1. Being With You; 2. If Our Hearts; 3. Too Late; 4. LIVE; 5. Leave This Girl Alone; 6. Kahit Isang Saglit; 7. Hey Mister; 8. Somewhere In Time; 9. Being With You (Extended Version); 10. Being With You (Acapella); 11. Being With You (Radio Version); 12. Too Late (Extended Version) |
| Love Is in Your Eyes | Released: July 18, 1994; Label: Dypro Records; Formats: Compact Disc (CD) and Digital Streaming Platform | 1. Love Is In Your Eyes; 2. Less Than Love; 3. Maximum Power; 4. Sa Aking Pag-Iisa; 5. Sayang; 6. This Belongs To You; 7. Maximum Power (Extended Version); 8. This Belongs To You (Extended Version) |
| Re-Issue Series: I'm Me | Released: January 01, 2010; Label: Vicor Music Corporation; Formats: Digital Streaming Platform | Same tracklist with I'm Me album |

=== Singles and Collaborations ===
- 1983: Palabra De Honor (Palabra De Honor OST)
- 1983: Mortal Sin (ft. Ric Segreto, Mortal Sin OST)
- 2002: Jesus Loves Me (This I Know)
- 2002: Umagang Kay Ganda (ft. Janno Gibbs)
- 2006: Bituing Marikit
