= Guillermo Salinas =

Chilean boxer

Personal information
- Nationality: Chilean
- Born: 27 January 1938 (age 87)

Sport
- Sport: Boxing

Guillermo Salinas (born 27 January 1938) is a Chilean boxer. He competed in the men's middleweight event at the 1964 Summer Olympics.
