= Sofia (Filipino singer) =

- Website: http://www.sofia.com.ph

Sofia is a bossa nova singer in the Philippines. She graduated from the University of Santo Tomas with a degree in Medical Technology. She is now a licensed medical technologist.

Sofia became the featured artist in a bossa-inspired album project of Ivory Records by accident. After graduating, she was on her way to Japan to pursue her research scholarship grant to study hematology when she was asked to help gather research materials for the project, since she was into bossa nova since she was in high school. Aside from helping out for the lyrics, CDs, and other research materials, she was also asked to submit a demo tape so that Ivory Records would know what bossa sounds like. Sofia submitted a demo tape of the song "Desafinado". The record company was impressed, and then she was tapped to be a session singer. Eventually she was chosen to be the featured artist for the album.

Her album, entitled Bossa Latino Lite, debuted at No.11 at Tower Records’ Top 25 albums chart.

Sofia's second album was released December 28, 2006, entitled In Love With Nova Bossa.

On April 1, 2007, her debut album Bossa Latino Lite reached the gold mark. The awarding took place on SOP, a noontime television show in the Philippines.

Her influences in music include Cynthia Alexander, Wolfgang, Paulinho Da Viola, Tom Jobim, Paulinho Moska, Big Mountain, The Corrs, Pinikpikan, Bob Aves, and Eraserheads.

== Discography ==
Title: Bossa Latino Lite under Ivory Records
Released: 2006
Number of Tracks: 18

1. Waters Of March (Aguas De Marco)
2. The Look Of Love
3. Breaking Up Is Hard To Do (duet With Roji Soriano) - Sofia (duet with Roji Soriano)
4. Just The Way You Are
5. At Seventeen (Instrumental)
6. Will You Still Love Me Tomorrow (featuring Roji Soriano) - Sofia (featuring Roji Soriano)
7. Just No Ordinary Day
8. Let's Wait Awhile
9. Constantly (Instrumental)
10. Blue Moon (duet With Roji Soriano) - Sofia (duet with Roji Soriano)
11. Desafinado (Off-Key)
12. Moonlight Over Paris (Instrumental)
13. It's Too Late
14. Englishman In New York (featuring Roji Soriano) - Sofia (featuring Roji Soriano)
15. Sorry Doesn't Make It Anymore
16. Dance With Me
17. Every Little Thing (She Does Is Magic) (Instrumental)
18. Waters Of March ( Aguas De Marco) - Sofia (duet with Roji Soriano)

Title: In Love With Nova Bossa under Ivory Records
Released: 2006
Number of Tracks: 18
1. You Are The Sunshine Of My Life
2. Falsa Baiana
3. Sad To Belong
4. I'll Never Fall In Love Again
5. I Will - Duet With Thor
6. So Nice (Samba De Verao)
7. Tell Me
8. Birthday Song
9. Hulog Ng Langit
10. Night And Day
11. Can't Take My Eyes Off Of You
12. I'll Take Care Of You
13. Warm Impressions
14. Só Em Teus Braços (Soh Ayng Teush Brah-soos)
15. Unexpectedly
16. What A Wonderful World
17. Moro Na Roça (Moh-roh-nah Hoh-sah)
18. Moro Na Roça (Festive Dance Mix)

Title: By Request...Lite And Easy under Ivory Records
Released: 2007
Number of Tracks: 16
1. Birthday Song
2. Sad To Belong
3. Let's Wait Awhile
4. Just The Way You Are
5. Can't Take My Eyes Off You - Sofia (with Thor)
6. Sorry Doesn't Make It Anymore
7. I'll Take Care Of You
8. I'll Never Fall In Love Again
9. Breaking Up Is Hard To Do - Sofia (with Roji Soriano)
10. The Look Of Love
11. What A Wonderful World
12. Night And Day
13. Blue Moon - Sofia (with Roji Soriano)
14. It's Too Late
15. Warm Impressions
16. So Nice (Samba De Verao)

Title: Sofia under Ivory Records 2 Disc Set - Disc 1: Bossa Latino Lite (18 tracks) and Disc 2: In Love with Nova Bossa (18 tracks)
Released: 2007
Number of Tracks: 36
1. Water of March (Aguas De Marco)
2. The Look Of Love
3. Breaking Up Is Hard To Do - Sofia duet with Roji Soriano
4. Just The Way You Are
5. At Seventeen [Instrumental]
6. Will You Still Love Me Tomorrow - Sofia featuring Roji Soriano
7. Just No Ordinary Day
8. Let's Wait Awhile
9. Constantly [Instrumental]
10. Blue Moon - Sofia duet with Roji Soriano
11. Desafinado (Off-Key)
12. Moonlight Over Paris [Instrumental]
13. It's Too Late
14. Englishman In New York - Sofia featuring Roji Soriano
15. Sorry Doesn't Make It Anymore
16. Dance With Me
17. Every Little Thing (She Does Is Magic) [Instrumental]
18. Waters Of March (Aguas De Marco) - Sofia duet with Roji Soriano
19. You Are The Sunshine Of My Life
20. Flasa Baiana
21. Sad To Belong
22. I'll Never Fall In Love Again
23. I Will - Sofia duet with Thor
24. So Nice (Samba De Verao)
25. Tell Me
26. Birthday Song
27. Hulog Ng Langit
28. Night And Day
29. Can't Take My Eyes Off Of You - Sofia duet with Thor
30. I'll Take Care Of You
31. Warm Impressions
32. So Em Teus Bracos (Soh Ayng Teush Brah-soos)
33. Unexpectedly
34. What A Wonderful World
35. Moro Na Roca (Moh-roh-nah Hoh-sah)
36. Moro Na Roca [Festive Dance Mix]

== Singles ==
- "Just No Ordinary Day"
- "Waters of March (Aguas de Março)"
- "Moro Na Roça (Festive Dance Mix)"
- "Hulog ng Langit"
