= Mellow Fellow =

Lo-fi singer/songwriter

- Born: Ralph Lawrence Reyes; Sucat, Muntinlupa
- Genres: dream pop; bedroom pop; lo-fi
- Years active: 2015–present
- Website: Bandcamp

Mellow Fellow is the stage name of Filipino lo-fi music singer/songwriter Ralph Lawrence "Polo" Reyes.

== Background ==
A self-described "internet artist," Reyes has released three albums as Mellow Fellow. He gained notoriety in the burgeoning online bedroom pop scene with the release of his 2017 single "Dancing" and the subsequent release of the single "How Was Your Day?", a collaboration with indie pop singer Clairo. He also collaborated with dream pop duo Vansire on their 2018 album Angel Youth.

In 2019 he toured the US with frequent musical collaborator Ruru, following an Asia tour earlier in the year.

== Discography ==
Albums

- Mellow Fellow (2014)
- 604 DIAMOND STREET (2015)
- Jazzie Robinson (2017)

Singles

- "Dancing" (2017)
- "How Was Your Day" (with Clairo, 2017)
- "Yours Alone" (2019)
- "Heaven" (2024)
