= Marri Nallos =

Filipina pop singer

- Origin: Manila, Philippines
- Genres: Pop, OPM, adult contemporary
- Years active: 2000–present
- Labels: Star Records (2000), Sony BMG (2006–present)

Marri Nallos is a pop singer from the Philippines.

== Biography ==
Nallos was born in Rome and raised in London. She is a graduate of the London Academy of Music and Dramatic Art with honors. She was discovered by the late Inday Badiday and George Canseco who described Nallos as having a "crystal voice" after seeing her in gigs at Hyatt's Calesa Bar in 2000.

She signed a contract with Star Records for her first single, "Alipin Ako". She released her self-titled second record under Universal Records, Marri Nallos. Her cover of "Making Love Out of Nothing at All" by Jim Steinman is featured on the album.

Her first EP is entitled Destiny from ADC Entertainment & Music Publishing and distributed by VIVA Records. The record includes "You Are My Destiny" (a duet with Juan Rodrigo), "Gaan" (composed by George Canseco), the remake of "Making Love Out of Nothing at All", "Ikaw pa Rin ang Mamahalin" and "I Didn't Mean to Hurt You".

She released her second EP entitled The Crystal Voice of Asia on Sony BMG Records. It contains a version of "Imagine" by John Lennon, and a cover of the Paul Anka song, "You Are My Destiny", a duet number with Juan Rodrigo.

Nallos released her third EP entitled Dahil Mahal Kita under Sony BMG. Nallos plays the piano and has her own compositions on this record.

She gained popularity after her rendition of "Mahal Naman Kita" was used as a theme song for the successful Koreanovela, A Rosy Life aired on GMA Network. After a year, her rendition of "Making Love Out of Nothing at All" was used also on a Koreanovela aired on the same network, My Husband's Woman.

== Discography ==
- Mari
- Marri Nallos
- Destiny (EP)
- The Crystal Voice of Asia (EP)
- Dahil Mahal Kita (EP)
- The Zenith (ALBUM- Guest)
- Luvin the Rhymes (EP)
- You're My Loverman (Single)
