= Kyle Raphael =

Filipino singer and songwriter

- Born: Kyle Raphael Borbon
- Origin: Davao City, Philippines
- Genres: Pop; acoustic; OPM
- Occupations: Singer; songwriter
- Instrument: Guitars
- Years active: 2018–present
- Label: Viva

Kyle Raphael Borbon is a Filipino singer and songwriter from Davao City. He was first recognized after winning the grand prize at Himig Handog in 2018 for the song "Sa Mga Bituin Na Lang Ibubulong" performed by JM de Guzman, which he wrote. His song "Libu-Libong Buwan (Uuwian)" marked his debut on Spotify Philippines' Top Artists Chart, reaching number 28 on the platform's daily Viral Chart. He signed under Viva Records.

== Early life and education ==
Kyle Raphael Borbon was raised in Davao City. He began writing songs at the age of 15, influenced by his father, who is also a songwriter. He graduated with a bachelor's degree in Psychology. His father is a lawyer, and his family initially hoped he would pursue a career in law.

== Career ==
Raphael first entered the scene in 2018 as a grand finalist in Himig Handog. His composition "Sa Mga Bituin Na Lang Ibubulong", interpreted by JM de Guzman and Jason Dy, won the grand prize. Following the competition, he signed with Viva Records, initially writing songs for other artists such as Ashley Diaz, Sam Cruz, and Atasha Muhlach.

Raphael released singles including "Dahil Kailangan Kita" (2019), "Buwan ng Mayo" (2019), "Pa'no Kung" (2020), "Bihira" (2021), "Paraluman" (2021), "Byahe (Hunyo)" (2022), and "Hanggang Tingin" (2023). "Paraluman" charted on Spotify's Viral 50 Philippines. "Hanggang Tingin" begins as a soft ballad before shifting into a mid-tempo song, showing Raphael's struggle to admit his true feelings. While it shares some similarities with "Paraluman," it has its own style and mood. He wrote "Hanggang Tingin" in 2020, inspired by a close female friend, and kept his feelings private so their friendship would not be affected.

He won an Awit Award for Best Performance by a New Male Recording Artist for "Buwan ng Mayo".

In 2025, he released "Libu-Libong Buwan (Uuwian)", inspired by the love of his grandparents. The song entered Billboard Philippines Hot 100 chart at No. 23 and has gained nearly 50,000 TikTok uses.

In 2026, he held his first solo concert at Viva Café. He performed as an opening act for artists including Rob Deniel, Adie, Amiel Sol, and Arthur Nery.

== Artistry ==
Raphael writes songs that explore love, longing, and quiet admiration. Over the years, his sound shifted from ballads and jazz to a softer, mellow acoustic style, especially after releasing "Libu-Libong Buwan (Uuwian)". He has mentioned international artists Paul Anka, Frank Sinatra, and Elvis Presley, as well as local bands Hale and Orange and Lemons, as his musical influences.

== Discography ==
=== Singles ===
List of singles, showing year released, and peak chart positions
Title	Year	Peak chart positions		
Title	Year	PHL	PHL Top.	PHL IFPI
"Dahil Kailangan Kita"	2019	—	—	—
"Buwan ng Mayo"	2019	—	—	—
"Pa'no Kung"	2020	—	—	—
"Bihira"	2021	—	—	—
"Paraluman"	2021	—	—	—
"Byahe (Hunyo)"	2022	—	—	—
"Hanggang Tingin"	2023	—	—	—
"BB"	2024	—	—	—
"himlay/lubay"	2024	—	—	—
"Libu-Libong Buwan (Uuwian)"	2025	5	5	5
"Kung Para Sa'Yo"	2026	—	—	—

=== Other works ===
Year	Artist	Song	Written with
2018	JM de Guzman	"Sa Mga Bituin Na Lang Ibubulong"	Himself

== Awards ==
- Himig Handog (2018) – Grand Winner
- Awit Awards – Best Performance by a New Male Recording Artist
