= John Melo =

Filipino singer and songwriter

Dr. Ponciano Melo Jr., DDS is known in the Philippines under his stage name of John Melo. John Melo is a Filipino singer and songwriter. He won the 1993 Awit Awards for Best New Male Performance. After a long absence from the music scene, he returned in 2017 with his new song Malapit Na Ang Pasko. He is also a U.S. correspondent and sports news writer

== Biography ==
Melo is the singer of Malapit Na Ang Pasko which is the first Filipino song to be recorded in San Francisco, Golden Bridge U.S. for a Christmas theme. He is recently named as OFW Prince of Christmas Song due to dedicating a Christmas song for all overseas Fillipino workers (OFW) around the world. Multi Awarded Songwriter Jimmy Borja composed this song for Melo. Melo is a consultant in California and a member of the American Dental Association.

=== Early life ===
Melo inherited his love for music from his mother Leticia Cortes, who took up Bachelor of Music Major in Piano in the University of Santo Tomas.

As a child, Melo looked up to Anthony Castelo (known for hits like “Nang Dahil sa Pag-ibig” and “Balat kayo”). His admiration for the singer later led him on to revive two Castelo songs for his “Magtiwala Ka” album namely “Ibig Kong Ibigin Ka” and “Nang Dahil Sa Pag-ibig”.

He has tributed many songs for others such as Manny Pacquiao, with the song "Laban Mo, Laban Ko."

=== Malapit Na Ang Pasko and Christmas Tree is Blue ===
"Malapit Na Ang Pasko" and "Christmas Tree is Blue" are Melo's Christmas songs dedicated to all OFWs as sense of gratitude, being an OFW himself. While working at his dental business offices in San Jose and Newark, California, Melo managed to render songs for OFWs.

Melo expressed that his life as an OFW away from his loved ones in the Philippines is encapsulated in the song Malapit Na Ang Pasko being in California for more than a decade.

There are plans that his English Christmas song "Christmas Tree is Blue" be released in 2018.

=== U.S. International Correspondent and Sports News Writer ===
Melo pursued a sports news writing career under Manila Standard and international correspondent of Bombo Radyo Philippines. Some of his articles covering NBA, Manny Pacquiao and other sports news. Boxing and NBA news are his biggest contribution to Filipinos worldwide.

== Awards and Distinctions ==
=== Awit Awards ===
1993 Melo won the title as Best New Male Recording Artist in the 1993 Awit Awards with "Hanap Hanap Kita". He bested other up-and-coming names in the music scene for the plum such as Chad Borja, Willie Garte and Calvin Millado.

=== Gold Record Award ===
In 1992 Melo received his Gold Record Award. His debut album "Ikaw Pala Ang Minamahal" was composed by Vehnee Saturno and arranged by Homer Flores.

Ikaw Pala Ang Minamahal Album with carrier single Hanap-hanap Kita includes

- Ang Mahalaga
- Hanap-hanap kita
- Ikaw Pala Ang Minamahal
- Kung Mayroong Ikaw
- Kursunada Kita
- Nais Kung Malaman Mo
- Nakita Ko Na
- Sanay Laging Kapiling Ka

== See also ==
- Jose Mari Chan
- Haiji Alejandro
