= Bing Rodrigo =

Filipino singer

- Born: December 8, 1954
- Died: July 13, 2001 (aged 46)
- Occupation: Singer

Bing Rodrigo (December 8, 1954 – July 13, 2001) was a Filipino singer most famous for songs such as "Bakit May Pag-ibig Pa" and "Gintong Araw". He was also known to have sung the most memorable jingle in all of Philippine culture, the "Seiko Wallet" commercial. He was contemporary to Jun Polistico, Anthony Castelo and Nonoy Zuñiga, and was crowned "King of Tagalog Songs" in 1982, and scored a number of gold records. He died in 2001.

== Discography ==
- "Bakit May Pag-ibig Pa"
- "'Di Ko Ipagpapalit"
- "Gintong Araw"
- "Hiram Lamang"
- "Huwag Ka Nang Lumuha"
- "Ikaw Pa Rin"
- "Magbalik Ka"
- "Mahal Mo Pala Ako"
- "May Pag-ibig Pa Ba?"
- "May Silangan Pa"
- "Minamahal Kita"
- "Sinayang Mo"
- "Sugat sa Tinik"
