= Christine Love (singer) =

Filipino singer

- Birth name: Christine Love
- Occupation: recording artist
- Years active: 2005–present
- Labels: Viva
- Website: christinelovemusic.com

Christine Love is a Filipino singer. She received Aliw Awards Best Female Artist award on 2009 and Best in a Live performance in a concert in 2010. She has released several albums under VIVA records.

Love released her debut album Up The Clouds in 2008. She released her album Happy on 2009 featuring the cover song "Happy" originally by Michael Jackson.

== Discography ==
=== Studio album ===
- Happy (Viva Records)
- Until The End Of Time (Viva Records)
