= Kris Angelica =

Filipina singer

- Born: Kris Angelica A. Dela Cruz; 1998 or 1999 (age 26–27)
- Years active: 2009–present

Kris Angelica 1998 or 1999 (age 26–27) is a Filipina singer and a television personality. She began her career at the age of 10 when she was the first runner-up on the TV show, Birit Baby.

== Personal life ==
Kris Angelica A. Dela Cruz was born in 1998 or 1999 (age 26–27) in the Province of Laguna.

=== Career ===
In 2009, when she was 10 years old, she was first runner-up in the noontime show Eat Bulaga's Birit Baby. In 2011, she was discovered by David Foster in the online talent search "Born to Sing", and was invited to perform at the Hit Man Returns: David Foster & Friends concert at the Araneta Coliseum. In 2012 she became part of Red Models and Talents Manila, and performed on MyPhone's Nationwide Tour. In Tacloban City, her video performance of Gloc 9's Hit Sirena reached almost two million views within one day on Facebook. Red Models and Talents Manila produced her first single and music video titled Nasaan Ka Na in 2013.

On June 23, 2015, she launched her debut single on Spotify under VIVA records, titled Sabi-Sabi. The song was written and composed by Thyro and Yumi.

Two days after its release, Sabi-Sabi had more than 5,000 plays. A week later it was the number one single on Spotify Philippines Viral 50.

== Discography ==
=== Singles ===
Year	Song	Album	Label	Notes
2015	Sabi-Sabi	NA	Viva Records	No. 1 in Spotify Philippines Viral 50
2014	Nasaan Ka Na	NA	RED Manila PH	experimental Project under RED Manila PH

== Filmography ==
Year	Title	Role
2009	Eat Bulaga	Herself
