= Joy Salinas =

Filipino singer

Joy Salinas is a Filipino singer in dance music.

== Biography ==
Joy Salinas started playing the guitar at the age of 14. In the 1980s, she moved to Italy, and in 1987 won an audition for The G.B. Show, and was featured in seven episodes.

In 1989, Salinas recorded her first single, "Paris Night", which was successful in France. In the summer of 1991, her single "Rockin' Romance", which she sang at the Festivalbar, sold 13,000 copies in the first two weeks after its release in Italy. She placed third in the Festivalbar competition. The song is included in the soundtrack of the film Abbronzatissimi.

In the same year, Salinas released her debut self-titled album, Joy Salinas, which included the song "The Mystery of Love". The song was also included in the soundtrack of the film Christmas Holidays '91.

The single "Party Time" was released in 1992 in collaboration with DJ Herbie.

In 1993, Salinas's single "Bip Bip" and her second album of the same title was ranked as the best-selling and most danced-to album, reaching 76th and 86th place, respectively, of the best-selling singles of the year.

In 1994, Salinas recorded the singles "Gotta Be Good" (by Mario Fargetta) and "Calling You Love", a hit of summer 1994, with rapper Kevin Orlando Ettienne.

In 1995, she released "Let Me Say I Do".

In 1997, Salinas released the album Dream in Paradise, which included the single "Give Me a Break", the soundtrack of the film Panarea.

After a break, Salinas returned in 2013 with an album titled Starlight.

== Discography ==
=== Albums ===
- Joy Salinas (1991)
- Bip (1993)
- Dream in Paradise (1997)
- Starlight (2013)

=== Singles ===
- 1989 – "Paris Night"
- 1991 – "Rockin' Romance"
- 1991 – "The Mystery of Love"
- 1992 – "Stay Tonight"
- 1993 – "Bip Bip"
- 1993 – "People Talk"
- 1993 – "Hands Off (Set Me Free)"
- 1994 – "Gotta Be Good"
- 1994 – "Callin' You Love"
- 1995 – "Let Me Say I Do"
- 1995 – "Deputy of Love"
- 1996 – "Give Me a Break"
- 1997 – "Dream in Paradise"
- 1998 – "Calling You"
- 2003 – "I Can't Stop"
- 2012 – "Keeping the Planets"
- 2013 – "Something You Wanted"
