= Sarah Geronimo discography =

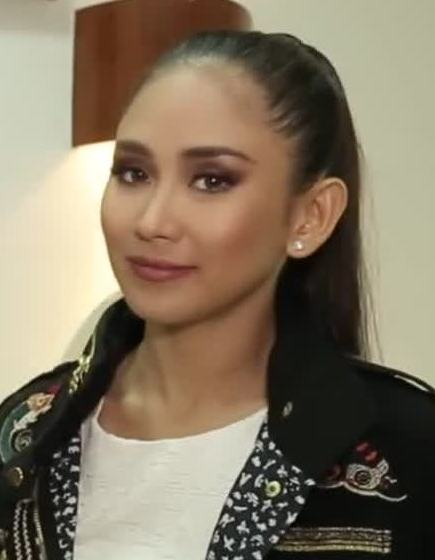
- Sarah Geronimo in 2019
- Studio albums: 13
- Soundtrack albums: 4
- Live albums: 1
- Compilation albums: 1
- Singles: 31
- Video albums: 4

Filipino singer Sarah Geronimo has released 13 studio albums, 4 video albums, one live album, one compilation album, 4 soundtrack albums and 31 singles. Geronimo's debut album Popstar: A Dream Come True was certitifed 10× Platinum. Her sophomore album Sweet Sixteen was also a commercial success, achieving 3× Platinum by PARI.

Her 10th studio album Expressions was certified Platinum. In 2014, Geronimo was recognised as the Best-selling Filipino artist of 2014 in the 22nd World Music Awards. The next year, she made her debut on the Billboard charts with The Breakup Playlist: The Official Movie Soundtrack peaking at No. 9 on World Albums. Geronimo's albums Perfectly Imperfect and The Great Unknown have each won Album of the Year at the Awit Awards.

== Albums ==
=== Studio albums ===
List of albums, with sales and certifications
Title	Album details	Sales (Note: Sales are based on the album certification received alone.)	Certifications
Popstar: A Dream Come True	Released: September 11, 2003; Label: Viva Records; Formats: CD, cassette	PHL: 310,000 (Note: Popstar: A Dream Come True has reportedly sold 500,000 copies nationwide (including pirated copies) as of 2004.)	PARI: 10× Platinum
Sweet Sixteen	Released: November 16, 2004; Label: Viva Records; Formats: CD, cassette	PHL: 60,000	PARI: 2× Platinum
Becoming	Released: July 20, 2006; Label: Viva Records; Formats: CD, cassette	PHL: 30,000	PARI: Platinum
Taking Flight	Released: July 25, 2007; Label: Viva Records; Formats: CD, cassette	PHL: 30,000	PARI: Platinum
Just Me	Released: September 12, 2008; Label: Viva Records; Formats: CD, digital download	PHL: 30,000	PARI: Platinum
Your Christmas Girl	Released: October 20, 2009; Label: Viva Records; Formats: CD, digital download	PHL: 20,000	PARI: Platinum
Music and Me	Released: December 22, 2009; Label: Viva Records; Formats: CD, digital download	PHL: 20,000	PARI: Platinum
One Heart	Released: May 13, 2011; Label: Viva Records; Formats: CD, digital download	PHL: 150,000	PARI: 5× Platinum
Pure OPM Classics	Released: September 1, 2012; Label: Viva Records; Formats: CD, digital download	PHL: 45,000	PARI: 3× Platinum
Expressions	Released: July 22, 2013; Label: Viva Records; Formats: CD, digital download	PHL: 15,000	PARI: Platinum
Perfectly Imperfect	Released: October 4, 2014; Label: Viva Records; Formats: CD, digital download	PHL: 15,000	PARI: Platinum
The Great Unknown	Released: December 4, 2015; Label: Viva Records; Formats: CD, digital download	PHL: 15,000	PARI: Platinum
This 15 Me	Released: April 13, 2018; Label: Viva Records; Formats: CD, digital download	PHL: 30,000	

=== Soundtrack albums ===
List of soundtrack albums, with sales and certifications
Title	Album details	Sales (Note: Sales are based on the album certification received alone.)	Certifications
Star For A Night	Released: 2003; Label: Viva Records; Formats: CD, cassette	PHL: 120,000	PARI: 6× Platinum
Night of the Champions	Released: 2004; Label: Viva Records; Formats: CD, cassette		
Can This Be Love OST	Released: 2005; Label: Viva Records; Formats: CD, cassette		
Search for the Star in a Million	Released: 2005; Label: Viva Records; Formats: CD, cassette		
Ang Bango ng Pasko	Released: 2005; Label: Viva Records; Formats: CD, digital download		
Bituing Walang Ningning	Released: 2006; Label: Viva Records; Formats: CD, digital download		
Hotsilog	Released: 2006; Label: ASAP Music; Formats: CD, digital download		
Little Big Superstar	Released: 2007; Label: Viva Records; Formats: CD, digital download		
Pangarap na Bituin	Released: 2007; Label: Viva Records; Formats: CD, digital download		
The Breakup Playlist	Released: 2015; Label: Viva Records; Formats: CD, digital download	PHL: 30,000	PARI: 2× Platinum
Miss Granny OST	Released: 2018; Label: Viva Records; Formats: CD, digital download		

=== Compilation albums ===
List of compilation albums, with sales and certifications
Title	Album details	Sales (Note: Sales are based on the album certification received alone.)	Certifications
OPM	Released: 2008; Label: Viva Records; Formats: CD, digital download	PHL: 15,000	PARI: Platinum

=== Live albums ===
List of live albums
Title	Album details
The Other Side: Live Album	Released: 2005; Label: Viva Records; Formats: CD, digital download

== Video and DVD releases ==
Information
Popstar: A Dream Come True Concert
- Released: 2004
- Concert
- VCD
The Other Side
- Released: November 9, 2005
- Concert
- CD, VCD, DVD
In Motion
- Released: February 27, 2008
- Concert
- VCD, DVD
The Next One
- Released: 2009
- Concert
- DVD
Record Breaker
- Released: March 16, 2010
- Concert
- DVD
Sarah Geronimo Music Video Collection
- Released: December 8, 2010
- Compilation
- DVD
24/SG
- Released: December 2012
- Concert
- DVD

== Singles ==
List of singles as lead artist, showing year released, selected chart positions, and associated albums
Title	Year	Peak chart positions				Album
Title	Year	PH MV	PHL	TPS	US WDSS	Album
To Love You More"	2003	-	Chart did not exist		Chart did not exist	Popstar: A Dream Come True
"Forever's Not Enough"	2003	1	Chart did not exist		Chart did not exist	Popstar: A Dream Come True
"Broken Vow" (with Mark Bautista)	2003	1	Chart did not exist		Chart did not exist	Popstar: A Dream Come True
"Paano Kita Mapasasalamatan"	2003	1	Chart did not exist		Chart did not exist	Popstar: A Dream Come True
"Sa Iyo"	2004	1	Chart did not exist		Chart did not exist	Popstar: A Dream Come True
"If Only"	2004	1	Chart did not exist		Chart did not exist	Popstar: A Dream Come True
"Tunay Talaga"	2004	-	Chart did not exist		Chart did not exist	Sweet Sixteen
"How Could You Say You Love Me"	2004	1	Chart did not exist		Chart did not exist	Sweet Sixteen
"Hanggang Kailan"	2004	-	Chart did not exist		Chart did not exist	Sweet Sixteen
"Lumingon Ka Lang"	2005	1	Chart did not exist		Chart did not exist	Sweet Sixteen
"I Want to Know What Love Is"	2005	-	Chart did not exist		Chart did not exist	Sweet Sixteen
"Love Can't Lie"	2005	1	Chart did not exist		Chart did not exist	Sweet Sixteen
"Can This Be Love"	2005	1	Chart did not exist		Chart did not exist	Can This Be Love Soundtrack
"I Finally Found Someone" (with Mark Bautista)	2005	-	Chart did not exist		Chart did not exist	The Other Side: Live Album
"I Still Believe in Loving You"	2006	1	Chart did not exist		Chart did not exist	Becoming
"Carry My Love"	2006	1	Chart did not exist		Chart did not exist	Becoming
"Bituing Walang Ningning"	2006	-	Chart did not exist		Chart did not exist	Bituing Walang Ningning Soundtrack
"I'll Be Alright"	2007	-	Chart did not exist		Chart did not exist	Taking Flight
"Ikaw (Sarah Geronimo song)"	2007	1	Chart did not exist		Chart did not exist	Taking Flight
"Kahit Na"	2007	-	Chart did not exist		Chart did not exist	Taking Flight
"Pangarap na Bituin"	2007	-	Chart did not exist		Chart did not exist	Pangarap na Bituin Soundtrack
"A Very Special Love"	2008	1	Chart did not exist		Chart did not exist	A Very Special Love Soundtrack
"I'll Be There" (feat. Howie Dorough)	2008	1	Chart did not exist		Chart did not exist	Just Me
"Ngayon, Bukas at Kailanman"	2008	-	Chart did not exist		Chart did not exist	OPM
"You Changed My Life In A Moment"	2009	1	Chart did not exist		Chart did not exist	You Changed My Life Soundtrack
"Dahil Minahal Mo Ako"	2009	1	Chart did not exist		Chart did not exist	Just Me
"Something New in My Life"	2009	-	Chart did not exist		Chart did not exist	In My Life Soundtrack
"Your Christmas Girl"	2009	-	Chart did not exist		Chart did not exist	Your Christmas Girl
"Record Breaker"	2009	1	Chart did not exist		Chart did not exist	Music and Me
"Right Here Waiting"	2010	1	Chart did not exist		Chart did not exist	Music and Me
"Please Be Careful with My Heart" (with Christian Bautista)	2010	1	Chart did not exist		Chart did not exist	Music and Me
"Love Will Keep Us Together"	2010	-	Chart did not exist		-	Hating Kapatid Soundtrack
"You'll Always Be My Number One"	2010	-	Chart did not exist		-	1DOL Soundtrack
"Sino Nga Ba Siya"	2011	1	Chart did not exist		-	One Heart
"Fallin"	2011	1	Chart did not exist		-	One Heart
"Kung Siya Ang Mahal"	2011	-	Chart did not exist		-	One Heart
"I Won't Last A Day Without You"	2011	1	Chart did not exist		-	Won't Last A Day Without You Soundtrack
"Bakit Pa Ba?"	2012	1	Chart did not exist		-	One Heart
"Anak"	2012	-	Chart did not exist		-	Pure OPM Classics
"Tao"	2012	-	Chart did not exist		-	Pure OPM Classics
"It Takes A Man And A Woman"	2013	1	Chart did not exist		-	It Takes A Man And A Woman Soundtrack
"Ikot-Ikot"	2013	1	Chart did not exist		-	Expressions
"Tayo"	2013	1	Chart did not exist		-	Expressions
"Maybe This Time"	2014	1	22	15	-	Maybe This Time Soundtrack
"Kilometro"	2014	1	Chart did not exist	Chart did not exist	-	Perfectly Imperfect
"Perfectly Imperfect"	2015	1	Chart did not exist	Chart did not exist	-	Perfectly Imperfect
"Minamahal"	2015	1	Chart did not exist	Chart did not exist	-	Perfectly Imperfect
"Dulo"	2016	1	Chart did not exist	Chart did not exist	-	Perfectly Imperfect
"Tala"	2016	1	Chart did not exist	Chart did not exist	12	The Great Unknown
"The Great Unknown" (with Hale)	2016	1	Chart did not exist	Chart did not exist	-	The Great Unknown
"Kaibigan Mo" (with Yeng Constantino)	2017	1	16	Chart did not exist	-	The Great Unknown
"Misteryo"	2017	1	-	Chart did not exist	-	The Great Unknown
"Ako'y Para Lamang Sayo"	2017	-	-	Chart did not exist	-	The Great Unknown
"Sandata"	2018	-	-	Chart did not exist	-	This 15 Me
"Ganito"	2018	-	Chart did not exist	Chart did not exist	-	This 15 Me
"Duyan"	2018	-	Chart did not exist	Chart did not exist	-	This 15 Me
"Tagu-Taguan"	2020	-	Chart did not exist	Chart did not exist	-	This 15 Me
"Dati-Dati"	2022	-	-	Chart did not exist	-	Non-album single
"Cuore"	2022	-	-	Chart did not exist	-	Non-album single
"Sansinukob, Salamat"	2022	-	-	Chart did not exist	-	Non-album single
"Alam" (with John Roa)	2023	-	-	Chart did not exist	-	Non-album single
"Himig ng Puso"	2023	-	-	Chart did not exist	-	Non-album single
"Habang Buhay"	2023	-	-	Chart did not exist	-	Non-album single
"Healing"	2023	-	-	Chart did not exist	-	Non-album single
"Sa Paglayag"	2023	-	-	Chart did not exist	-	Non-album single
"My Mind" (with Billy Crawford)	2023	-	-	Chart did not exist	-	Non-album single
"Hangganan" (with John Roa)	2023	-	-	Chart did not exist	-	Non-album single
"Treading Water" (with Bamboo Mañalac)	2023	-	-	Chart did not exist	-	Non-album single
"Umaaligid (with SB19)	2025	4	49	-	4	Non-album single

== Songwriting credits ==
Year	Song	Album	Co-writers
2013	"Make Me Yours"	Expressions	Louie Ocampo
2018	"Ganito"	This 15 Me	Nica Del Rosario
2023	"Hangganan"	Non-album single	Jin Chan
2023	"My Mind"	Non-album single	Jin Chan, Billy Crawford

== Soundtracks ==
Year	Song	Film / TV
2003	"Paano Kita Mapasasalamatan"	Filipinas
2004	"Hanggang Kailan"	Lastikman: Unang Banat
2004	"Tunay Kitang Minamahal"	Annie B.
2005	Can This Be Love"	Can This Be Love
2006	"Bituing Walang Ningning"	Bituing Walang Ningning
2006	"Nasaan Ka Man" (with Zsa Zsa Padilla)	Bituing Walang Ningning
2006	"Dito Ba" (with Angelika dela Cruz)	Bituing Walang Ningning
2006	"Felt So Right"	Bituing Walang Ningning
2006	"Million Miles Away"	Bituing Walang Ningning
2007	"Pangarap na Bituin"	Pangarap na Bituin
2007	"Tara Tena" (with Maja Salvador)	Pangarap na Bituin
2007	"Same Ground"	Pangarap na Bituin
2007	"Naaalala Ka" (with Jericho Rosales)	Pangarap na Bituin
2007	"Sundan ang Bituin"	Pangarap na Bituin
2007	"Di Ka Mawawala sa Puso Ko" (with Jericho Rosales)	Pangarap na Bituin
2007	"Kung Ako na Lang Sana"	Pangarap na Bituin
2007	"Pangarap Ko Ang Ibigin Ka"	Pangarap na Bituin
2007	"Ako'y Sa'yo, Ika'y Sa'kin"	Pangarap na Bituin
2008	"Very Special Love"	A Very Special Love
2008	"Tangi Kong Pangarap"	I.T.A.L.Y.
2008	"Ikaw ang Aking Pangarap"	Lobo
2008	"Ngayon, Bukas at Kailanman"	Baler
2009	"You Changed My Life in a Moment"	You Changed My Life
2009	"Something New in My Life"	In My Life
2009	"Record Breaker"	Sunsilk
2010	"Love Will Keep Us Together"	Hating Kapatid
2011	"Fallin"	Catch Me, I'm in Love
2011	"I Won't Last A Day Without You"	Won't Last A Day Without You
2012	"Tuloy" (with Somedaydream and Gary Valenciano)	Coca-Cola: Tuloy Ang Happiness!!!
2013	"It Takes A Man And A Woman"	It Takes A Man And A Woman
2013	"Own Today"	Sunsilk
2013	"Buhay Pamilya"	Jollibee
2014	"Maybe This Time"	Maybe This Time
2014	"Do The Moves" (with Apl.de.Ap and Enrique Gil)	Rexona Do: The Moves
2014	"Star Life"	SM Development Corporation
2014	"Jolly Jolly Joy Joy" (with Darren Espanto and Lyca Gairanod)	Jollibee
2015	"Paano Ba Ang Magmahal?" (with Piolo Pascual)	The Breakup Playlist
2015	"Selfie Moment"	Sunsilk
2015	"Pamilyang Pilipino"	Jollibee
2015	"Ang Sugo Ng Diyos Sa Mga Huling Araw"	Felix Manalo
2015	"The Look"	JAG Jeans
2016	"The Heart Of The Filipino"	Philippine Airlines
2016	"Win Your Day"	Sangobion
2017	"Sulong Dugong Pinoy"	Sangobion
2017	"I Just Fall in Love Again"	Finally Found Someone
2018	"Apat na Dekada (with Gary Valenciano)"	Jollibee: 40 Years of Joy
2019	"Sa Mga Nangungulila (with This Band)"	Coca-Cola Philippines
2019	"Kahit Ayaw Mo Na"	Coca-Cola Philippines
2019	"Sana Ngayong Pasko (with This Band)"	Coca-Cola Philippines
2020	"Basta't Kapiling Ka, Masaya Ang Pasko"	Coca-Cola Philippines
2021	"Live Your World"	ACER Philippines

== Other appearances ==
Year	Song	Album
2002	"To Love You More"	Star for a Night
2003	"Ako'y Maghihintay" (Mark Bautista with Sarah Geronimo)	Mark Bautista
2004	"To Love You More" (Live)	Night of the Champions
2004	"Broken Vow" (Live) (feat. Mark Bautista)	Night of the Champions
2004	"If Only" (Live)	Night of the Champions
2004	"Celine Dion Medley" (Live)	Night of the Champions
2005	"Forever's Not Enough" (Live)	Return of the Champions
2005	"Ako'y Maghihintay" (Live) (with Mark Bautista)	Return of the Champions
2005	"It's All Coming Back to Me Now" (Live)	Return of the Champions
2005	"Ang Bango ng Pasko"	Single-only release
2006	"Pers Lab"	Hotsilog: The ASAP Hotdog Compilation
2007	"Sisikat Din Ako"	Little Big Superstar
2007	"Reach for the Sky"	Little Big Superstar
2008	"Kailangan Kita"	GV25: An All Star Album Tribute to Gary Valenciano
2009	"Magkaisa"	Paalam, Maraming Salamat President Corazon C. Aquino
2009	"Please Be Careful with My Heart" (Christian Bautista with Sarah Geronimo)	Romance Revisited: The Love Songs of Jose Mari Chan
2018	"Kulang Ako Kung Wala Ka" (Erik Santos with Sarah Geronimo)	Eri1k 5antos

=== Other VCD/DVD releases ===
- (2004) Sing Along With Sarah Vol. 1

Formats: VCD, DVD

- (2007) Sing Along With Sarah Vol. 2

Formats: VCD, DVD
