= Sarah Geronimo videography =

Filipino actress filmography

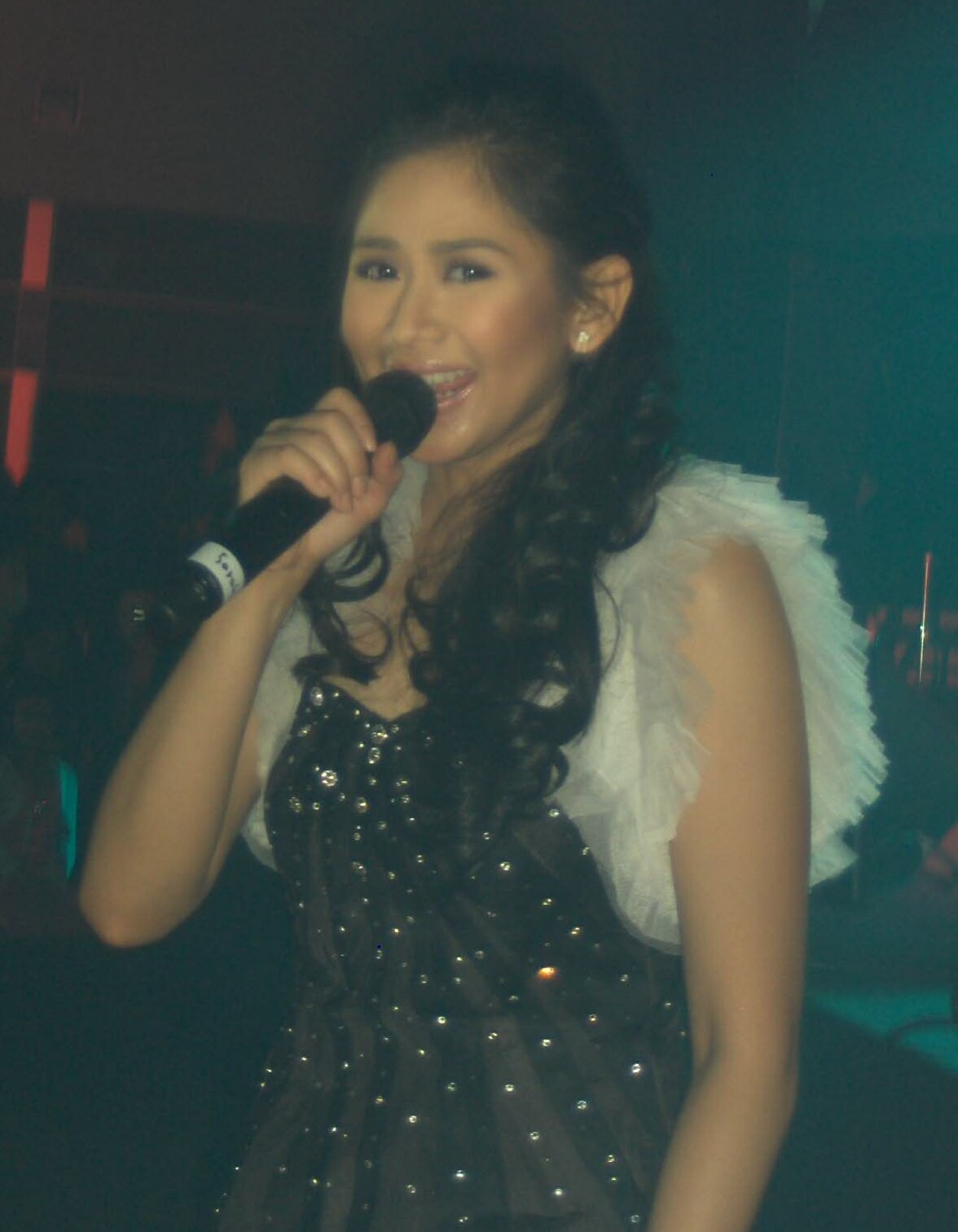
Geronimo performing in London in 2009

Filipino singer and actress Sarah Geronimo has released many music videos, and has appeared in motion pictures and television programs. She began appearing in various television programs as a child, before winning the reality competition series Star for a Night. She made her acting debuts in the films Filipinas and Captain Barbell (both 2003). In 2004, she signed a network deal with ABS-CBN, where she made her television acting debut in the series Sarah the Teen Princess.

After several supporting film roles, Geronimo starred in her first lead role in the film A Very Special Love (2008), alongside John Lloyd Cruz. Geronimo and Cruz reprised their roles in its sequels You Changed My Life (2009) and It Takes a Man and a Woman (2013), which also became successful. In 2011, she co-starred with her future husband Matteo Guidicelli in the film Catch Me, I'm in Love. She reunited with Cruz in the 2017 film Finally Found Someone. Geronimo portrayed the lead character in Miss Granny (2018), and portrayed an autistic girl in the film Unforgettable (2019).

Geronimo expanded her career into reality television talent shows, serving as a judge on the reality singing competition The Voice of the Philippines (2013) and its spin-offs The Voice Kids (2014–2015, 2019) and The Voice Teens (2017, 2020).

== Music videos ==
=== 2000s ===
Title	Year	Other performer(s)	Album	Ref(s)
"Forever's Not Enough"	2003	None	Popstar: A Dream Come True	
"Sa Iyo"	2004	None	Popstar: A Dream Come True	
"How Could You Say You Love Me"	2004	None	Sweet Sixteen	
"Love Can't Lie"	2005	None	Sweet Sixteen	
"Ikaw"	2007	None	Taking Flight	

=== 2010s ===
Title	Year	Other performer(s)	Album	Ref(s)
"Kung Siya ang Mahal"	2011	None	One Heart	
"Ikot-Ikot"	2013	None	Expressions	

== Filmography ==
=== Film ===
Key
†	Denotes films that have not yet been released

Film credits of Sarah Geronimo
Year	Title	Role	Ref.
1995	Sarah... Ang Munting Prinsesa	Sarah's friend	
2003	Filipinas	Kathleen	
2003	Captain Barbell	Mara	
2004	Lastikman: Unang Banat	Lara Manuel	
2008	A Very Special Love	Laida Magtalas	
2009	You Changed My Life	Laida Magtalas	
2010	Hating Kapatid	Cecilia Maria Salvador	
2011	Catch Me, I'm in Love	Roanne Sanchez	
2011	Won't Last A Day Without You	George Apostol/DJ Heidee	
2013	It Takes a Man and a Woman	Laida Magtalas	
2014	Maybe This Time	Stephanie Asuncion	
2015	The Breakup Playlist	Trixie David	
2017	Finally Found Someone	Aprilyn Esguerra	
2018	Miss Granny	Feliza "Fely" Malabaño / Audrey de Leon	
2019	Sarah Geronimo: This 15 Me	Herself	
2019	Unforgettable	Jasmine Lagman	

=== Television ===
Television credits of Sarah Geronimo
Year	Title	Role	Notes	Ref.
1992	Penpen de Sarapen	Herself		
1995	Ang TV	Herself		
1997	NEXT	Herself		
2003	SOP	Herself		
2004	ASAP Natin 'To!	Herself		
2004	Sarah the Teen Princess	Sarah Alagao		
2005	SCQ Reload Kilig Ako	Sarah		
2005	Search for the Star in a Million	Herself	Host	
2006	Maalaala Mo Kaya	Rose Erea	Episode: "Kwintas"	
2006	Bituing Walang Ningning	Dorina Pineda		
2007	Pangarap Na Bituin	Emerald Gomez		
2008	Maalaala Mo Kaya	Marie	Episode: "Dollhouse"	
2010	Popstar Diaries	Herself		
2010	1DOL	Belinda "Billie/Jean" Suarez		
2013	The Voice of the Philippines	Herself	Coach	
2014	The Voice Kids	Herself	Coach	
2014	The Voice of the Philippines	Herself	Coach	
2015	The Voice Kids	Herself	Coach	
2017	The Voice Teens	Herself	Coach	
2019	The Voice Kids	Herself	Coach	
2020	The Voice Teens	Herself	Coach	

== See also ==
- List of awards and nominations received by Sarah Geronimo
