= List of awards and nominations received by Sarah Geronimo =

Sarah Geronimo awards and nominations
Awards and nominations
Award	Wins	Nominations
Aliw Awards	8	8
Awit Awards	19	48
Billboard Women in Music	1	1
Box Office Entertainment Awards	18	18
Classic Rock Awards	1	1
FAMAS Awards	4	9
Golden Screen Awards	1	3
KBP Golden Dove Awards	2	2
Mnet Asian Music Awards	1	1
MTV Europe Music Awards	1	4
Myx Music Awards	28	56
Nickelodeon Philippines Kids' Choice Awards	1	2
Star Awards For Movies	4	5
Star Awards For Music	10	43
Wish 107.5 Music Awards	0	1
World Music Awards	1	4

Totals (Note: Certain award groups do not simply award one winner. They acknowledge several different recipients, have runners-up, and have third place. Since this is a specific recognition and is different from losing an award, runner-up mentions are considered wins in this award tally. For simplification and to avoid errors, each award in this list has been presumed to have had a prior nomination.)
- Wins: 96
- Nominations: 194

Sarah Geronimo is a Filipina singer, dancer, actress and record producer. She has received several awards and nominations for her work in music, film, and television. She has also won the Best Asian Artist at the Mnet Asian Music Awards in 2012, Best Southeast Asian Act at the MTV Europe Music Awards in 2014, Best Selling Filipino Artist at the 22nd World Music Awards, Best Asian Performer at Classic Rock Roll of Honour Awards in 2016, and the Global Force Award at Billboard Women in Music in 2024. She was inducted into the Anak TV Hall of Fame in 2013. Geronimo is a Goodwill Ambassador for Music of the National Commission for Culture and the Arts and a recipient of their Ani ng Dangal or "Harvest of Honors" state recognition for multi-disciplinary arts.

== Aliw Awards ==
Year	Nominee / work	Award	Result
2003	Herself	Most Promising Female Entertainer	Won
2004	Forever's Not Enough	Best Performance By Female Recording Artist	Won
2004	Sa Iyo	Best Dance Song	Won
2010	Record Breaker	Best Female Major Concert Act	Won
2010	Herself	Entertainer of the Year	Won
2011	What Love Is	Best Collaboration For A Concert	Won
2012	24/SG	Best Female Major Concert of the Year	Won
2015	Herself	Best Female Performer in Mall Shows	Won

== ASAP Pop Viewers' Choice Awards ==
Year	Nominee / work	Award	Result
2006	I Still Believe In Loving You	Pop Song	Won
2006	Becoming	Pop Album	Won
2006	Dorina (Bituing Walang Ningning)	Pop TV Character	Won
2006	Bituing Walang Ningning	Pop TV Theme Song	Won
2007	Carry My Love	Pop Female Performance	Won
2008	Herself	Pop Female Artist	Won
2008	Very Special Love	Pop Song	Won
2008	Taking Flight	Pop Album	Won
2008	Herself (Very Special Love)	Pop Female Performance	Won
2008	A Very Special Love (Laida Magtalas)	Pop Movie	Won
2008	A Very Special Love	Pop Movie Theme Song	Won
2008	Pangarap na Bituin (Pangarap na Bituin)	Pop TV Theme Song	Won
2009	Herself	Pop Female Artist	Won
2009	You Changed My Life	Pop Song	Won
2009	Herself (Dahil Minahal Mo Ko)	Pop Female Performance	Won
2009	You Changed My Life (Laida Magtalas)	Pop Movie	Won
2009	You Changed My Life	Pop Movie Theme Song	Won
2009	Laida Magtalas (You Changed My Life)	Pop Screen Kiss	Won
2009	Ashllyod (Herself & John Lloyd Cruz)	Pop Love Team	Won
2010	Herself	Pop Female Artist	Won
2010	You Changed My Life	Pop Album	Won
2010	Right Here Waiting	Pop Music Video	Won
2010	Love Will Keep Us Together (Hating Kapatid)	Pop Movie Theme Song	Won
2010	You'll Always Be My Number One(1DOL)	Pop TV Theme Song	Won
2011	Herself	Pop Female Artist	Won
2011	Sino Nga Ba Siya	Pop Song	Won
2011	One Heart	Pop Album	Won
2011	Catch Me, I'm in Love (Roanne Sanchez)	Pop Movie	Won
2011	Fallin (Catch Me, I'm in Love)	Pop Movie Theme Song	Won
2011	Herself (Meg)	Pop Cover Girl	Won
2011	Herself	Pop Netizen	Won
2012	Herself	Pop Female Artist	Won
2012	Bakit Pa Ba	Pop Song	Won
2012	Pure OPM Classics	Pop Album	Won
2012	Sino Nga Ba Siya	Pop Music Video	Won
2012	Won't Last A Day Without You	Pop Movie Theme Song	Won
2012	Herself	Pop Cover Girl	Won
2013	Herself	Pop Female Artist	Won
2013	Expressions	Pop Album	Won
2013	It Takes a Man and a Woman	Pop Music Video	Won
2013	It Takes a Man and a Woman (Laida Magtalas)	Pop Movie	Won
2013	It Takes a Man and a Woman	Pop Movie Theme Song	Won
2013	Laida Magtalas (It Takes a Man and a Woman)	Pop Screen Kiss	Won
2013	Herself	Pop Cover Girl	Won
2014	Herself	Pop Female Artist	Won
2014	Maybe This Time	Pop Music Video	Won
2014	Maybe This Time (Maybe This Time)	Pop Movie Theme Song	Won

== Awit Awards ==
Year	Nominee / work	Award	Result
2003	Herself	Best New Female Recording Artist	Won
2004	Forever's Not Enough	Best Performance by a New Female Recording Artist	Won
2004	Sa Iyo	Best Dance Recording	Won
2008	Ikaw	Song of the Year	Won
2009	Ngayon, Bukas at Kailanman	Best Song Written for Movie/TV/Stage Play	Nominated
2010	Right Here Waiting	Music Uplate Live Texter's Choice Best Performance by a Female Recording Artist	Won
2010	Herself	EGG's AllHits.ph Most Downloaded Artist	Won
2012	One Heart	Best Selling Album of the Year	Won
2012	Wish with Anton Alvarez	Best Collaboration	Nominated
2012	One Heart	Album of the Year	Nominated
2012	Sino Nga Ba Sya	Best Ballad Recording	Nominated
2012	Sino Nga Ba Sya	EGG's AllHits.ph Most Downloaded Song	Won
2012	Herself	EGG's AllHits.ph Most Downloaded Artist	Won
2013	Tao	Best Performance by a Female Recording Artist	Nominated
2013	Tao	Best Ballad Recording	Nominated
2013	Pure OPM Classics	Album of the Year	Nominated
2014	Ikot-Ikot	Best Performance by a Female Recording Artist	Nominated
2014	Ikot-Ikot	Song of the Year	Nominated
2014	Ikot-Ikot	Best R&B Recording	Won
2014	Expressions	Album of the Year	Nominated
2014	Expressions	Best Selling Album of The Year	Nominated
2014	Sweetest Mistake	Best Ballad Recording	Nominated
2014	Make Me Yours	Best Inspirational/Religious Recording	Nominated
2015	Kilometro	Best Performance by a Female Recording Artist	Nominated
2015	Kilometro	Song of the Year	Nominated
2015	Kilometro	Best R&B Recording	Nominated
2015	Perfectly Imperfect	Album of the Year	Won
2015	Perfectly Imperfect	Best Album Package	Nominated
2015	Kilometro	Music Video of the Year	Nominated
2016	The Great Unknown	Album of the Year	Won
2016	Tala	Song of the Year	Nominated
2016	Unbroken	Best Ballad Recording	Nominated
2016	Sariling Awit Natin	Best Song Written for Movie/TV/Stage Play	Nominated
2016	Paano Ba Ang Magmahal?	Best Song Written for Movie/TV/Stage Play	Nominated
2019	Isa Pang Araw	Best Performance by a Female Recording Artist	Won
2019	Isa Pang Araw	Best Song Written for Movie/TV/Stage Play	Won
2019	Herself	People's Voice Favorite Female Artist	Won
2023	Dati-Dati	Best Performance by a Female Recording Artist	Won
2023	Dati-Dati	People's Voice Favorite Song	Nominated
2023	Herself	People's Voice Favorite Female Artist	Won
2024	Treading Water ft. Bamboo	Best Collaboration	Nominated
2024	Alam ft. John Roa	Best Collaboration	Nominated
2024	Himig ng Puso	Best Ballad Recording	Nominated
2024	Treading Water ft. Bamboo	Best Engineered Recording	Nominated
2024	Herself	People's Voice Favorite Solo Artist	Won
2024	Treading Water ft. Bamboo	People's Voice Favorite Collaboration	Won
2024	Alam ft. John Roa	People's Voice Favorite Collaboration	Nominated
2024	Hangganan ft. Jin Chan	People's Voice Favorite Music Video of the Year	Nominated

== Billboard Women in Music ==
=== Billboard Women in Music ===
Year	Award	Result	Host Country
2024	Global Force Award	Honored	United States

=== Billboard Philippines Women in Music ===
Year	Award	Result	Host Country
2024	Woman of the Year	Honored	Philippines

== Box Office Entertainment Awards ==
Year	Nominee / work	Award	Result
2003	Herself	Most Promising Singer	Won
2005	Sweet Sixteen	Female Recording Artist of the Year	Won
2006	Becoming	Female Recording Artist of the Year	Won
2008	In Motion	Female Concert Performer of the Year	Won
2009	Just Me	Female Recording Artist of the Year	Won
2009	The Next One	Female Concert Performer of the Year	Won
2009	A Very Special Love	Box Office Queen	Won
2010	You Changed My Life	Box Office Queen	Won
2011	Record Breaker	Female Recording Artist of the Year	Won
2012	Catch Me ... I'm In Love	Princess Of Philippine Movies	Won
2014	Expressions	Female Recording Artist of the Year	Won
2014	Perfect 10	Female Concert Performer of the Year	Won
2014	It Takes A Man And A Woman	Box Office Queen	Won
2014	Herself	Female Star of the Night	Won
2015	Perfectly Imperfect	Female Recording Artist of the Year	Won
2016	Perfectly Imperfect	Female Recording Artist of the Year	Won
2017	The Great Unknown	Female Recording Artist of the Year	Won
2024	Sarah G X Bamboo	Female Concert Performer of the Year	Won

== Classic Rock Awards ==
Year	Award	Result	Host Country
2016	Best Asian Performer	Won	Japan

== FAMAS Awards ==
Year	Nominee / work	Award	Result
2009	Ngayon, Bukas at Kailanman	Best Theme Song	Won
2009	Herself	Golden Artist Award	Recipient
2010	You Changed My Life	Best Actress	Nominated
2010	You Changed My Life in a Moment	Best Theme Song	Nominated
2014	It Takes A Man And A Woman	Best Actress	Nominated
2015	Herself	Iconic Movie Queen of Philippine Cinema	Recipient
2016	Ang Sugo ng Diyos sa mga Huling Araw	Best Theme Song	Won
2019	Isa Pang Araw	Best Theme Song	Nominated
2019	Miss Granny	Best Actress	Nominated

== Golden Screen TV Awards ==
Year	Nominee / work	Award	Result
2009	A Very Special Love	Best Performance by an Actress in a Lead Role (Musical or Comedy)	Nominated
2010	You Changed My Life	Best Performance by an Actress in a Lead Role (Musical or Comedy)	Nominated
2014	It Takes A Man And A Woman	Best Performance by an Actress in a Lead Role (Musical or Comedy)	Won

== KBP Golden Dove Awards ==
Year	Nominee / work	Award	Result
2006	Little Big Star	Best Variety Program	Won
2013	Sarah G. Live	Best Variety Program	Won

== Mnet Asian Music Awards ==
Year	Award	Result	Host Country
2012	Best Asian Artist (Philippines)	Won	Hong Kong

== MTV Awards ==
=== MTV Europe Music Awards ===
Year	Award	Result	Host Country
2013	Best Southeast Asian Act	Nominated	Netherlands
2014	Best Southeast Asian Act	Won	United Kingdom
2014	Best Regional Act (Southeast Asia, China, Hong Kong and Taiwan)	Nominated	United Kingdom
2016	Best Southeast Asian Act	Nominated	Netherlands

== Myx Music Awards ==
Year	Nominee / work	Award	Result
2006	Herself	Favorite Female Artist	Nominated
2006	I Wanna Know What Love Is	Favorite Remake	Nominated
2006	Love Can't Lie	Favorite Mellow Video	Nominated
2007	Herself	Favorite Female Artist	Nominated
2007	I Still Believe In Loving You	Favorite Mellow Video	Nominated
2008	Herself	Favorite Artist	Won
2008	Herself	Favorite Female Artist	Won
2008	Ikaw	Favorite Song	Won
2008	Herself	Favorite Celebrity VJ	Won
2009	Herself	Favorite Artist	Won
2009	Herself	Favorite Female Artist	Won
2009	Herself	Favorite Celebrity VJ	Won
2009	A Very Special Love	Favorite Media Soundtrack	Won
2009	A Very Special Love	Favorite Mellow Video	Won
2009	A Very Special Love	Favorite Remake	Won
2010	Herself	Favorite Artist	Won
2010	Herself	Favorite Female Artist	Won
2010	Record Breaker	Favorite Media Soundtrack	Won
2010	You Changed My Life In A Moment	Favorite Remake	Won
2011	Herself	Favorite Female Artist	Nominated
2011	Sino Nga Ba S'ya	Favorite Mellow Video	Nominated
2011	Please Be Careful With My Heart	Favorite Collaboration	Nominated
2011	Love Will Keep Us Together	Favorite Media Soundtrack	Nominated
2012	Fallin	Favorite Media Soundtrack	Won
2012	Herself	Favorite Female Artist	Nominated
2013	Herself	Favorite Artist	Won
2013	Herself	Favorite Female Artist	Nominated
2013	Bakit Pa Ba	Favorite Remake	Won
2013	Tuloy	Favorite Media Soundtrack	Nominated
2014	Ikot-ikot	Favorite Music Video	Nominated
2014	Ikot-ikot	Favorite Song	Nominated
2014	Herself	Favorite Artist	Won
2014	Herself	Favorite Female Artist	Nominated
2014	It Takes a Man and a Woman	Favorite Media Soundtrack	Nominated
2014	It Takes a Man and a Woman	Favorite Remake	Won
2015	Tayo	Favorite Music Video	Won
2015	Herself	Favorite Artist	Won
2015	Herself	Favorite Female Artist	Won
2015	Maybe this Time	Favorite Remake	Won
2015	Do the Moves	Favorite Media Soundtrack	Nominated
2016	Minamahal	Favorite Music Video	Nominated
2016	Herself	Favorite Artist	Nominated
2016	Herself	Favorite Female Artist	Nominated
2016	Paano Ba Ang Magmahal	Favorite Media Soundtrack	Nominated
2016	Minamahal	Best Music Video	Nominated
2017	Tala	Favorite Music Video	Won
2017	Tala	Favorite Song	Won
2017	Herself	Favorite Female Artist	Nominated
2017	Herself	Favorite Artist	Nominated
2017	The Great Unknown	Favorite Collaboration	Won
2017	The Great Unknown	Best Music Video	Nominated
2018	Misteryo	Favorite Music Video	Nominated
2018	Kaibigan Mo	Favorite Song	Nominated
2018	Kaibigan Mo (shared with Yeng Constantino)	Favorite Collaboration	Won
2018	Herself	Favorite Female Artist	Won
2018	Herself	Favorite Artist	Nominated

== Nickelodeon Kid's Choice Awards ==
=== Nickelodeon Kids' Choice Awards ===
Year	Award	Result	Host Country
2013	Favorite Asian Act	Nominated	United States

=== Nickelodeon Philippines Kids' Choice Awards ===
Year	Nominee / work	Award	Result
2004	Herself	Kids' Choice Award	Won
2008	Herself	Favorite Actress	Nominated

== PMPC Star Awards ==
=== PMPC Star Awards for Music ===
Year	Nominee / work	Award	Result
2009	Herself	Female Pop Artist of the Year	Won
2009	OPM	Album of the Year	Nominated
2009	Ikaw	Song of the Year	Nominated
2009	Herself	Female Recording Artist of the Year	Nominated
2009	Ikaw	Music Video of the Year	Nominated
2010	Music and Me	Female Recording Artist of the Year	Won
2010	Herself	Female Pop Artist of the Year	Nominated
2011	One Heart	Female Recording Artist of the Year	Won
2011	One Heart	Album of the Year	Nominated
2011	One Heart	Pop Album of the Year	Nominated
2011	Sino Nga Ba Siya?	Song of the Year	Nominated
2011	Herself	Female Pop Artist of the Year	Nominated
2012	What Love Is	Female Concert Performer of the Year	Won
2012	What Love Is	Concert of the Year	Nominated
2013	Herself	Female Recording Artist of the Year	Won
2013	24/SG	Concert of the Year	Nominated
2013	24/SG	Female Concert Performer of the Year	Nominated
2014	Expressions	Pop Album of the Year	Won
2014	Expressions	Album of the Year	Nominated
2014	Herself	Female Recording Artist of the Year	Won
2014	Herself	Female Pop Artist of the Year	Nominated
2014	Perfect 10	Female Concert Performer of the Year	Nominated
2014	Ikot-Ikot	Song of the Year	Nominated
2014	Expressions	Album Cover Concept and Design of the Year	Nominated
2014	Ikot-Ikot	Music Video of the Year	Nominated
2015	Herself	Female Recording Artist of the Year	Won
2015	Perfectly Imperfect	Album of the Year	Nominated
2015	Herself	Female Pop Artist of the Year	Nominated
2015	Perfectly Imperfect	Album Cover Concept and Design of the Year	Nominated
2015	Perfectly Imperfect	Pop Album of the Year	Nominated
2015	Kilometro	Music Video of the Year	Nominated
2016	The Great Unknown	Album Of The Year	Nominated
2016	Tala	Song of The Year	Nominated
2016	Herself	Female Recording Artist of The Year	Nominated
2016	Herself	Female Pop Artist of The Year	Nominated
2016	From The Top	Female Concert Performer of The Year	Won
2016	From The Top	Concert of The Year	Nominated
2016	The Great Unknown	Pop Album of The Year	Nominated
2016	The Great Unknown	Cover Design of The Year	Nominated
2018	The Great Unknown: Unplugged	Concert of the Year	Nominated
2018	The Great Unknown: Unplugged	Female Concert Performer of the Year	Nominated
2023	Tala: The Film Concert	Concert of the Year	Nominated
2023	Tala: The Film Concert	Female Concert Performer of the Year	Nominated
2024	Habang Buhay	Female Recording Artist of the Year	Won

=== PMPC Star Awards for Movies ===
Year	Nominee / work	Award	Result
2009	Ngayon, Bukas at Kailanman	Best Movie Theme Song	Won
2009	Herself	Female Star of the Night	Won
2016	The Breakup Playlist	Movie Actress of the Year	Nominated
2016	Ang Sugo Ng Diyos Sa Mga Huling Araw	Movie Original Theme Song of the Year	Won
2019	Miss Granny	Movie Actress of the Year	Won

== Wish 107.5 Music Awards ==
Year	Nominee / work	Award	Result
2024	"Dati-Dati"	Wish Pop Song of the Year	Nominated

== World Music Awards ==
Year	Award	Result	Host Country
2014	Best Selling Philippine Artist of the Year	Won	Monaco
2014	World's Best Female Act	Nominated	Monaco
2014	World's Best Entertainer	Nominated	Monaco
2014	World's Best Live Act	Nominated	Monaco
