= The Other Side (Sarah Geronimo album) =

The Other Side: Live Album

Live album by Sarah Geronimo
- Released: 2005 (Philippines)
- Genre: Pop
- Label: VIVA Records

Sarah Geronimo chronology
| Can This Be Love OST (2005) | The Other Side: Live Album (2005) | Becoming (2006) |

The Other Side: Live Album is a live album by Filipina singer Sarah Geronimo which was released on November 9, 2005. The concert featured Geronimo's duets with Piolo Pascual, Mark Bautista and Regine Velasquez. Japoy Lizardo was also her guest. She expressed wanting to sing with Nina, saying "Gusto ko rin sana na mag-guest si Nina dahil never pa kaming nagkasama pero, nagkataong may concert din siya the day after kaya di pwede". "I also wanted Nina to guest as we've never performed together but it just so happened that she also had a concert the day after so it couldn't be."

== Track listing ==
| Track no. | Name of song | Other info |
|---|---|---|
| 1 | "Hollaback Girl" / "Soldier" | Rap by Madkillah |
| 2 | "Can This Be Love" | |
| 3 | "I Want to Know What Love Is" | |
| 4 | "Love Can't Lie" | |
| 5 | "I Finally Found Someone" | Duet with Mark Bautista |
| 6 | Michael Jackson Medley ("You Are Not Alone", "Man in the Mirror", "Dangerous", "Billie Jean", "Black or White") | |
| 7 | "The Gift" / "My Valentine" | Duet with Piolo Pascual |
| 8 | Inspirational Medley ("Papa Can You Hear Me", "Can't Take That Away", "Light Of A Million Mornings") | Jim Steinman |
| 9 | Mariah / Whitney Medley ("Didn't We Almost Have It All", "Butterfly", "Through the Rain", "The Greatest Love of All", "When You Believe") | Duet with Regine Velasquez |
| 10 | "How Could You Say You Love Me" | |
| 11 | "To Love You More" | |
| 12 | "Forever's Not Enough" | -- |
