= This 15 Me World Tour =

2018 concert tour by Sarah Geronimo

This 15 Me
- Tour by Sarah Geronimo
- Promotional poster for Manila show
- Arranger: Louie Ocampo
- Associated album: This 15 Me
- Start date: April 14, 2018
- Legs: 5
- No. of shows: 6 in the Philippines; 6 in the United States; 3 in Canada; 3 in Middle East; 1 in East Asia
- Guests: Mark Bautista; Billy Crawford; Xian Lim; Daniel Padilla; James Reid; G-Force
- Producer: VIVA Live Inc.

Sarah Geronimo concert chronology
- "The Great Unknown: Unplugged" (2016); This 15 Me (2018)

This 15 Me was a promotional world tour by Filipino singer Sarah Geronimo, held in support of her thirteenth studio album of the same name. The tour also commemorated Geronimo's fifteenth anniversary in the Philippine entertainment industry. It commenced with a sold-out concert in Manila, which reportedly set the record for the highest-grossing local concert in the history of the Smart Araneta Coliseum. In August 2019, Netflix acquired the rights to stream the concert film, making Geronimo the first Filipino artist to have a concert film featured on the platform. The tour's setlist included several songs from the This 15 Me album, such as “Sandata,” “Ganito,” and “Duyan.” The Cebu leg of the tour was purchased by the BPO company Convergys as part of its "Made by You" 15th anniversary concert series. In other locations, including international and regional stops, the show was alternatively billed as Sarah G Live! This 15 Me or simply Sarah G Live!

== Development ==
The tour was organized to commemorate Geronimo's fifteenth year in the entertainment industry, which began in 2002 when she joined and ultimately won the television singing competition Star for a Night. Her victory launched a successful music and acting career that established her as one of the Philippines' top performers.The concert was officially announced on February 1, 2018, shortly before the surprise release of her thirteenth studio album, This 15 Me. Additional tour dates were announced during the Manila concert.

== Background ==
The Manila concert featured guest performances by James Reid, Xian Lim, Billy Crawford, Mark Bautista, and Daniel Padilla, who joined Geronimo during the three-hour show. Ronnie Liang and Sam Concepcion later appeared in other Philippine and international tour dates.

During the Manila leg, Geronimo's fanbase, known as the "Popsters," surprised the singer by illuminating the arena with red lights. A similar fan-led tribute had first been organized during her 2015 concert From the Top, making Geronimo the first local artist to receive such a coordinated audience gesture.

== Reception ==
Despite having less promotion, the concert managed to set a new record for Geronimo. As an addition to her record as the youngest solo artist to hold a show in Smart Araneta at the age of 16, Geronimo with her This 15 Me Concert broke the record for the Highest Grossing Local Concert in History. The hashtag #SarahGeronioThis15MeConcert trended on Twitter Philippines at number one on the day of the concert with over 200,000 tweets. Various recorded performances from the said show also landed on YouTube Philippines trends including her performances for Dulo, Tala, I Have Nothing and I Don't Wanna Miss A Thing while her take for the dance challenge Dame tu Cosita went viral on social media platforms Facebook and Twitter.

== Critical reception ==
=== Manila ===
Writing for ABS-CBN News, Sheila Reyes said that there was never a dull moment during the show and the momentum was kept up throughout the night. Allan Policarpio of Inquirer.net praised Geronimo's birit-medley number saying "Just because she doesn’t do it as much doesn’t mean she can’t handle big diva songs anymore. She sounded solid in Natural Woman And in I Have Nothing." "Sarah proves (as if we had any doubt) that she's the country's popstar princess" Rappler.com said.

=== Dubai ===
Chris Newbould from The National reviewed the show, praising Geronimo's talent and despising the event's support acts and commercialism probably due to Geronimo's constant pauses to thank the myriad sponsors and producer, "Geronimo rescues a strange evening" Newbould said. He also shared his disappointment on Geronimo not singing her songs from the film Miss Granny which was recently shown in Dubai.

== Film ==
Streaming platform Netflix acquired the rights to screen the concert film which was recorded in Manila. The rockumentary was tagged as Netflix Originals, making Geronimo the first Asian artist to have an original concert film available for streaming on the said platform. It became available on August 23, 2019. The show is Directed by long time creative collaborator of Sarah, Director Paul Alexei Basinillo.

== Setlist ==
1. "Dulo"
2. "Pray For Me"
3. "All The Stars"
4. "Wolves"
5. "Scared to Be Lonely"
6. "Tala"
7. "The Greatest Performance of My Life"
8. "This Is My Life"
9. "To Love You More"
10. "Can This Be Love" (background only)
11. "Broken Vow" with Mark Bautista
12. "How Could You Say You Love Me"
13. "Sa Iyo" (snippet only)
14. "Record Breaker" (snippet only)
15. "Love Me Like You Do" with Xian Lim
16. "Chunky" with James Reid
17. "Misteryo"
18. "Duyan"
19. "The Way Love Goes"
20. "A Woman's Worth"
21. "Skinny Love"
22. "Dive"
23. "I Put A Spell On You"
24. "Natural Woman"
25. "I Have Nothing"
26. "Ganito"
27. "The Great Unknown"
28. "Misty"
29. "Quando Quando" with Daniel Padilla
30. "The Way You Look Tonight" with Daniel Padilla
31. "Hold On, We're Going Home"
32. "Dare You To Move"
33. "Sandata"
34. "Ikot-Ikot"

=== Encore ===
1. "Leaving On A Jet Plane"
2. "I Don't Wanna Miss A Thing"
3. "Kilometro"

== Tour Dates ==
Date	City	Country	Venue
April 14, 2018	Quezon City	Philippines	Smart Araneta Coliseum
April 21, 2018	Los Angeles	United States	Los Angeles Theatre
April 22, 2018	San Diego	United States	Pala Casino
April 28, 2018	San Francisco	United States	City College of San Francisco
April 29, 2018	Las Vegas	United States	Pittsburg Creative Arts Theater
May 4, 2018	Chicago	United States	Copernicus Center
May 6, 2018	New York City	United States	Kupferberg Center for the Arts
June 30, 2018	Davao City	Philippines	SMX Convention Center
September 20, 2018	Dubai	United Arab Emirates	Dubai Duty Free Stadium
September 30, 2018	Iloilo	Philippines	Central Philippine University
October 7, 2018	Nagoya	Japan	Kounan Shimin Bunka Kaikan
November 9, 2019	Muscat	Oman	Qurum City Amphitheater
November 30, 2018	Santa Rosa	Philippines	Sta. Rosa City Complex
January 25, 2019	Doha	Qatar	Aspire Ladies Sports Hall
April 27, 2019	Cavite	Philippines	De La Salle University
May 18, 2019	Baguio	Philippines	University of Baguio
September 20, 2019	Toronto	Canada	John Bassett Theatre
September 22, 2019	Calgary	Canada	Grey Eagle Resorts and Casino
September 27, 2019	Winnipeg	Canada	RBC Convention Center
