= Arno Morales =

Filipino actor (born 1993)

- Born: June 18, 1993 (age 32)
- Occupation: Actor
- Years active: 2008-2014
- Agent: Star Magic

Arno Morales is a Filipino actor.

== Personal life ==
The fourth of five children, Arno Udo Palisoc Fuchs, also known as "Arno Morales", was born to a German father, Udo Fuchs, and a Filipina mother, Willhelma Palisoc Fuchs, on June 18, 1993.

== Filmography ==
Television
Year	Title	Role	Notes
2007	Star Magic Presents: Star Magic Presents: Abt Ur Luv Lyf 2	Prince	
2008	Star Magic Presents: Star Magic Presents: Astigs in Haay...skul Lyf	Bry	
2008	Star Magic Presents: Star Magic Presents: Astigs in Luvin' Lyf		

Film
Year	Title	Role	Notes
2008	A Very Special Love	Stephen Magtalas	
2008	You Changed My Life	Stephen Magtalas	
