= Taking Flight =

Studio album by Sarah Geronimo
- Released: July 25, 2007
- Genre: Pop
- Length: 44:09 (standard edition); 48:10 (repackaged)
- Languages: English; Tagalog
- Label: VIVA
- Producers: Vic del Rosario, Jr.; Vincent del Rosario; Alwyn Cruz; Baby Gil

Sarah Geronimo chronology
Becoming (2006)	Taking Flight (2007)	Just Me (2008)

Singles from Taking Flight
- 1. "I'll Be Alright" Released: 2007; 2. "Ikaw" Released: 2007; 3. "Kahit Na" Released: 2007; 4. "I'll Be Here" Released: 2008

Professional ratings
Review scores
Source	Rating
OPMusikahan.com	4.5/5 stars
AsianPopNews.com	8/10 stars

Taking Flight is the fourth studio album by the Filipino singer Sarah Geronimo, released on July 25, 2007, under VIVA Records. The album showcases songs by Louie Ocampo, Trina Belamide, Chuckie Dreyfus, Rebel Magdagasang, and Medwin Marfil.

== Singles ==
The carrier single of the album, "I'll Be Alright", was written by Louie Ocampo who was also the musical director of her concert In Motion at the Araneta Coliseum. It went gold in four months and sold more than 15,000 units, after she released her second single, "Ikaw", written by True Faith's frontman, Medwin Marfil. In February 2008, the album was already certified platinum, with sales of 30,000 units. The album was re-released with the cover song "Very Special Love", as a bonus track from her film A Very Special Love with John Lloyd Cruz. The third single released from the album was "Kahit Na". The song was composed by singer-songwriter Chuckie Dreyfus. The last single from the album was "I'll Be Here", written by Rebel Magdasang.

== Track listing ==
No.	Title	Writer(s)	Length
1.	"I'll Be Alright"	Louie Ocampo, Edith Gallardo	3:15
2.	"Ikaw"	Medwin Marfil	4:55
3.	"I'm Sorry"	Soc Villanueva, Jungee Marcelo	4:37
4.	"Time to Let Go" (featuring Mark Bautista)	Rebel Magdagasang	4:37
5.	"So"	Trina Belamide	3:48
6.	"Close to My Heart"	Ocampo, Gallardo	4:09
7.	"What If I"	Belamide	4:23
8.	"Miss"	Chuckie Dreyfus	3:40
9.	"I'll Be Here"	Magdagasang	3:20
10.	"Mr. Deadma"	Drizzle Muniz	3:21
11.	"Kahit Na"	Dreyfus	3:59

Repackaged edition bonus track
No.	Title	Writer(s)	Length
12.	"Very Special Love" (theme song from A Very Special Love)	Michael Lloyd	4:01

== Personnel ==
Credits were taken from Titik Pilipino.

- Alwyn Cruz - producer, vocal supervision
- Apol Gonzaga - background vocals
- Baby Gil - producer
- Bleps Carlos - concept and denim
- Eric Payumo - recording, mixing, mastering
- Fara Manuel - concept and denim
- Francis Dayao - logistics
- Guia G. Ferrer - A&R management
- Janet dela Fuente - stylist
- Juan Sarte - hair and make-up
- Juarde Herradura - background vocals
- Jun Tamayo - arranger
- Louie Ocampo - arranger
- Mark Nicdao - photography
- Marvin Querido - arranger
- MG Mozo - supervising producer
- Mia Marigomen - concept and denim
- Mon Faustino - arranger
- Nino Regalado - arranger
- Paul Alexei Basinillo - creative director
- Ralph Hilaga - logistics
- Rebel Magdagasang - arranger
- Riva Ferrer - background vocals, background vocals arranger
- RS Francisco - acting coach
- Sarah Geronimo - lead vocals
- Vic del Rosario, Jr. - executive producer
- Vincent del Rosario - executive producer

== Certifications ==
Country	Provider	Certification	Sales
Philippines	PARI	4× Platinum	60,000+

== Release history ==
Country	Release date	Format
Philippines	July 25, 2007	Standard (CD)
Philippines	October 2008	Repackaged (CD + bonus track)
United States	June 1, 2007	Standard (digital download)
