= Sarah Geronimo =

Filipino singer and actress (born 1988)

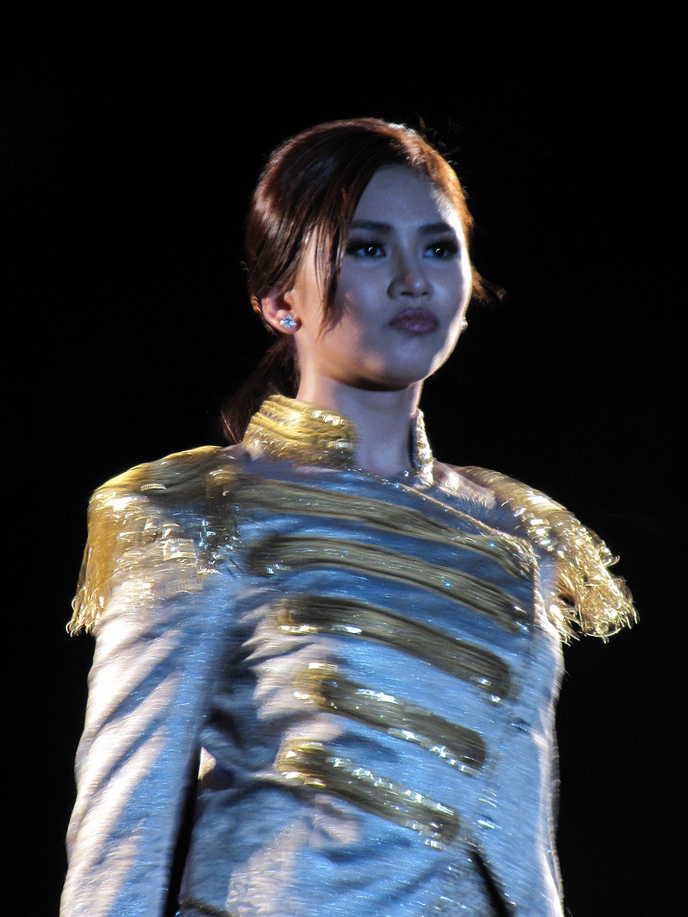
- Geronimo in 2011
- Born: Sarah Asher Tua Geronimo; July 25, 1988 (age 38); Manila, Philippines
- Other names: Sarah Geronimo Guidicelli; Sarah G
- Occupations: Singer; actress; record producer
- Years active: 1992–present
- Works: Discography; videography
- Spouse: Matteo Guidicelli (m. 2020)
- Awards: Full list
- Musical career
- Genres: OPM; pop
- Instrument: Vocals
- Labels: Viva; G-Music
- Website: www.sarahgeronimo.ph

Sarah Asher Tua Geronimo-Guidicelli (née Geronimo /hɛˈrɒnɪmoʊ/ herr-ON-ih-moh; born July 25, 1988) is a Filipino singer, actress, and record producer. Known for her vocal versatility, genre-spanning repertoire, and commanding stage presence, Geronimo is widely regarded as one of the most influential figures and one of the defining voices in Philippine pop music. Credited with shaping pop music in the Philippines, Geronimo became a staple of Pinoy pop culture and is considered one of the greatest pop stars of all time in the country.

Geronimo rose to prominence after winning the television talent show Star for a Night (2002). In 2003, she was signed to Viva Records, and released her debut studio album Popstar: A Dream Come True, supported by the singles "Forever's Not Enough" and "Sa Iyo”.

Geronimo reinvented her image and style with Becoming (2006) and Taking Flight (2007), gaining praise for her growth and maturity. She recorded covers on Music and Me (2009) and One Heart (2011), the latter of which also included original material and was supported by the singles "Sino Nga Ba Siya" and "Kung Siya ang Mahal". Geronimo produced her tenth studio album Expressions (2013), which featured the lead single "Ikot-Ikot". Her twelfth studio album, The Great Unknown (2015), contained the lead single "Tala", which sparked a trend between 2019 and 2020. In 2025, she launched her independent record label, G Music, marking a bold new chapter in her evolution as an artist and creative leader.

Geronimo made her acting debut with supporting roles in the films Filipinas and Captain Barbell (both 2003) and followed this with a co-starring role in Lastikman: Unang Banat (2004). She played leading roles in the film A Very Special Love (2008) and its sequels You Changed My Life (2009) and It Takes a Man and a Woman (2013), winning the Box Office Entertainment Awards for Box Office Queen for all three and the Golden Screen Award for Best Actress for the latter. She also starred in title role in Miss Granny (2018), for which she won a Star Award for Best Actress. She also starred in the television series Sarah the Teen Princess (2004), Bituing Walang Ningning (2006), Pangarap na Bituin (2007), and 1DOL (2010). Geronimo expanded her career into reality television talent shows as a host of the talent competition show Little Big Star (2005) and as a coach on The Voice of the Philippines (2013) and its spin-offs The Voice Kids (2014) and The Voice Teens (2017).

Dubbed the "Popstar Royalty" and the "Ultimate Pop Superstar", Geronimo is recognized as one of the most successful entertainers in Philippine music and entertainment history. Her accolades include a Billboard Women in Music Award, an MTV Europe Music Award, a World Music Award, an Mnet Asian Music Award, 19 Awit Awards, and 28 Myx Music Awards. Tatler magazine named her one of the most influential people in Asia in 2021, and Billboard Philippines named her as the Woman of the Year in 2024.

== Early life and career beginnings ==
Sarah Asher Tua Geronimo, the third of four siblings, was born on July 25, 1988, in Santa Cruz, Manila. Her father, Delfin, was a lineman for telecommunications company PLDT, while her mother, Divina (née Tua), was educated at University of Santo Tomas, where she majored in economics. Her family struggled financially and frequently moved houses; she put up a salon business to help make her family's ends meet.

Geronimo shared a close relationship with her father, who served as her first vocal coach. She learned about the childhood of singer Regine Velasquez, who was immersed neck-deep in the sea during her vocal training to strengthen her windpipe. Her father also submerged her in a water drum in imitation of the practice. At age two, she began singing and had performed in front of a crowd; her singing interest led her to join several amateur singing competitions. During her first competition, she performed Shirley Bassey's "The Greatest Performance of My Life". According to her mother, she began her career at age four as a cast member in the television series Penpen de Sarapen, Ang TV, and NEXT. In 1995, Geronimo appeared in the film Sarah... Ang Munting Prinsesa as a background actor, playing a friend of Camille Prats's character. That same year, she appeared at the World Youth Day as a musical performer and competed in 'Sang Linggo nAPO Sila's "Princess Asia".

== Music career ==
=== 2002–2003: Star for a Night and rise to prominence ===
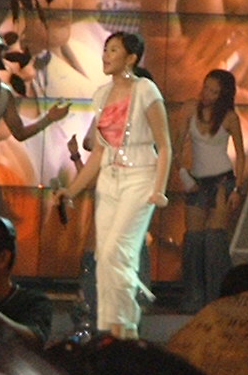
Geronimo performing at the Harrison Plaza in 2005

Geronimo was a junior at the University of Santo Tomas Education High School when she joined the reality television singing contest Star for a Night, based on the British talent show of the same name. Looking back, she recalled that she had auditioned for the contest three times, and was resentful after her second attempt. She won the competition on March 1, 2003, at the PhilSports Arena in Pasig City, performing a cover of Celine Dion's "To Love You More". After her win, she was signed to a record deal with Viva Records. She stated that her family was her inspiration despite the challenges they have been through. Geronimo then continued studying through homeschooling at the Angelicum College, where she received her high-school diploma in 2007.

After Star for a Night, Geronimo released her debut studio album Popstar: A Dream Come True. It included the singles "Sa Iyo", written by Jun Murillo, "Forever's Not Enough", written by Vehnee Saturno, and her rendition of Dion's "To Love You More". The album has sold over 300,000 units in the Philippines, and was certified 5× platinum. In support of the album, she headlined a concert in October at the Music Museum in Greenhills, San Juan.

At the second inauguration of Gloria Macapagal Arroyo on June 30, 2004, in Manila, Geronimo sang the Philippine National Anthem. The following month, she, Erik Santos, and Rachelle Ann Go co-headlined the concert titled Night of the Champions at the Araneta Coliseum in Quezon City; the production won the Best Major Concert Collaboration at the 2005 Aliw Awards. Her second studio album, Sweet Sixteen, was released that year; it contained the lead single, "How Could You Say You Love Me". The album was certified 2× platinum by the Philippine Association of the Record Industry (PARI). She also hosted the reality shows Little Big Star and Search for the Star in a Million. Next, she headlined her concert titled The Other Side at the Araneta Coliseum.

=== 2006–2010: Breakthrough ===
In July 2006, Geronimo released her third studio album, Becoming, which was produced by Carlo Nasi and Christian De Walden; it included the single "Carry My Love" and "I Still Believe In Loving You", the latter of which was written by Jimmy Borja, Lori Barth, and Ralf Stemmann. De Walden noted Geronimo's distinctive vocal ability, and recalled that she studied the demos during the album's production. Nestor Torre Jr. of the Philippine Daily Inquirer described it as "her transition from teen icon to young adult". Recorded in the Philippines, Italy, and the US, the album was first released in the Philippines, followed by Japan and Southeast Asia. At the third Manny Pacquiao vs. Erik Morales boxing match on November 18, 2006, Geronimo sang the Philippine National Anthem.

In 2007, Geronimo headlined In Motion, which was first staged at the Araneta Coliseum on July 14, followed by a US leg in August. Her studio album Taking Flight was released that same month; it contained the tracks "I'll Be Alright", "I'll Be Here" and "Ikaw". It received favorable reviews, with praise towards Geronimo's reinvention of her artistry. "Ikaw" was named the Song of the Year at the 2008 Myx Music Awards.

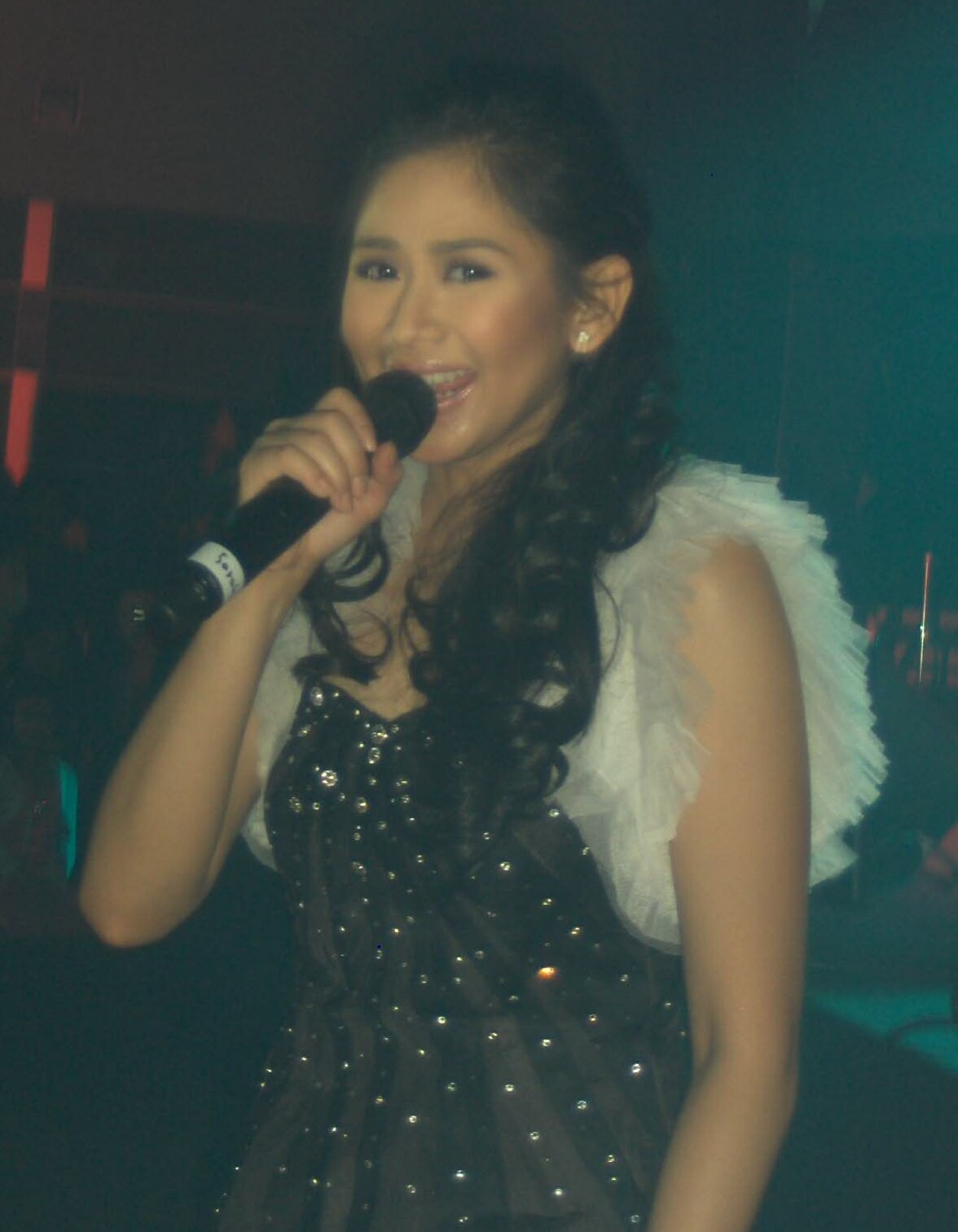
Geronimo performing in London in 2009

In 2008, Geronimo worked again with De Walden for her 16-track studio album, Just Me, which included a duet titled "I'll Be There" with Howie Dorough of the Backstreet Boys. At the Araneta Coliseum in November 2008, she headlined The Next One at the Araneta Coliseum, which was later followed by a US leg and a re-staging the following year.

In November 2009, she headlined a concert titled Record Breaker at the Araneta Coliseum. Geronimo won the Star Award for Female Pop Artist in 2009 for her compilation album OPM. She later announced that she began production on her next studio album Music and Me, which features covers of Original Pilipino Music (OPM) and international singles, including some songs from film soundtracks. She also collaborated with Christian Bautista for a cover of Jose Mari Chan and Regine Velasquez's "Please Be Careful with My Heart", which is also released in Bautista's album Romance Revisited: The Love Songs of Jose Mari Chan. For the album, Geronimo won the Star Award for Best Female Recording Artist.

=== 2011–2013: One Heart and Expressions ===
In February 2011, she collaborated with Martin Nievera in a Valentine's Day concert titled What Love Is at the Araneta Coliseum. In May, she released her eighth studio album, One Heart, which features a mix of original compositions and covers of OPM songs, such as "Sino Nga Ba Siya" and "Kung Siya ang Mahal", both written by Saturno. Asilo praised her musical style, while also highlighting Geronimo's "growing maturity", while Gil highlighted Geronimo's work on the original compositions. The album was named Best-Selling Album of the Year at the 2011 Awit Awards.

Geronimo began 2012 by appearing in Sarah G. Live, a weekly musical show that featured performances by musical guests. She said of the show: "Every time I do shows onstage to perform, I am not that confident. I still get nervous." Critic Mark Angelo Ching of the Philippine Entertainment Portal (PEP) praised Geronimo's vocal abilities, but criticized her talk show abilities. That July, she headlined a concert titled 24/SG at the Araneta Coliseum, which won the category for the Best Major Concert by a Female Artist at the 25th Aliw Awards; A review from ABS-CBN News described Geronimo as a "total performer", while also highlighting her stage presence. Geronimo was subsequently named the Female Concert Performer of the Year at the 4th Star Awards. In 2013, the tour was extended to the United States and re-staged.

Also in 2013, she released and produced her album titled Expressions, coinciding with her ten-year career milestone. Its lead single, "Ikot-Ikot", featured drum beats and elements of electronic dance music (EDM). Joseph Atilano of the Philippine Daily Inquirer wrote: "[Geronimo] deliver[ed] her vocals with a sense of urgency that matches the upbeat pace of [the song]." She collaborated with her father Delfin in a cover of Carole King's "You've Got a Friend", which was also recorded by James Taylor, and co-wrote the track "Make Me Yours", along with Louie Ocampo. Also in celebration of that milestone, on November 15, Geronimo performed a titled Perfect 10 at Araneta Coliseum. The concert was a commercial success, leading Geronimo to perform a second Perfect 10 concert at the Mall of Asia Arena on November 30. Patricia Esteves of The Philippine Star praised Geronimo for the maturity she displayed during the concert, also highlighting her stage presence. After the concert, she released her second single from Expressions, "Tayo", which won the Favorite Music Video at the 2015 Myx Music Awards. That same year, Geronimo was a coach on The Voice franchise series The Voice of the Philippines, and later returned in its spin-offs The Voice Kids and The Voice Teens.

=== 2014–2017: Perfectly Imperfect and The Great Unknown ===
Geronimo released the album Perfectly Imperfect in 2014, which included the single "Kilometro", written by Thyro Alfaro and Yumi Lacsamana. Adam Hurstfield also contributed to the album, producing the tracks "Bulletproof", "Last Night of Our Lives" and the title track "Perfectly Imperfect". Critics praised Geronimo's musical reinvention and transition to EDM-influenced tracks. (Note: Attributed to multiple references:) Geronimo received nominations at the 7th Star Awards for Music, winning Female Recording Artist of the Year for the album.

Geronimo released The Great Unknown in late 2015. Its lead single "Tala", was written and composed by Nica del Rosario, Emmanuel Sambayan, and Jumbo "Bojam" de Belen. Geronimo also collaborated with the band Hale on the title song, and with singer-songwriter Yeng Constantino on "Kaibigan Mo". In support of the album, Geronimo staged a concert on November 29, 2016, at the New Frontier Theater. She also performed a two-date concert titled From the Top at the Araneta Coliseum in December 2015.

=== 2018–present: This 15 Me and Billboard award ===
In 2018, Geronimo announced her new studio album titled This 15 Me. A celebration of her 15-year career, it yielded the singles "Sandata", "Ganito", and "Duyan". An accompanying music video for "Sandata" was released in July; directed by Paul Basinillo, it features Geronimo portraying the role of three different women in different storylines. The album was released in April; that same month, she embarked on its accompanying concert tour which began at the Araneta Coliseum. It was later followed by a US leg from April to May, and a Dubai leg in September. Reviews highlighted and commended Geronimo's musical versatility, vocal abilities, and stage performances. (Note: Attributed to multiple references:)

From late 2019 to early 2020, Geronimo's song "Tala" resurged into popularity after its accompanying dance challenge set to the song became a trend on social media; this resulted in the song's music surpassing 140 million views on YouTube in June 2020. In February 2020, Geronimo and Regine Velasquez co-headlined a concert, titled Unified, for which she was nominated for Female Concert Performer of the Year at the 2022 Star Awards for Music. Following her marriage to Matteo Guidicelli, she took a hiatus from her career. Despite the hiatus, her livestream concert, titled Tala: The Film Concert, was broadcast in 2021 via livestream platforms; it featured rearrangements of her previously released songs and was shot at the Araneta Coliseum. After a four-year hiatus from releasing music material, Geronimo released her single Dati-Dati in October 2022. Written by Jin Chan and produced by Su Ganade and Dylan Graham, it is described as an "ear-tweaking dance [track] that is grooving", with lyrics focusing on reliving positive experiences from the past. Later that month, she then released the next single "Cuore", which was co-written by Thyro Alfaro, Yumi Lacsamana, and her husband Matteo Guidicelli. Geronimo said that she at first rejected the song because the lyrics were too reminiscent of her personal life.

To mark her 20-year career milestone, Geronimo released her single "Habang Buhay" in March 2023. Two months later, also in commemoration of the milestone, Geronimo directed and headlined a concert in the Araneta Coliseum. During the concert, she debuted the single "My Mind" in collaboration with Billy Crawford, who served as the song's co-writer and co-producer; its accompanying music video was released the following year. Also at the Araneta Coliseum, Geronimo and Bamboo Mañalac co-headlined a concert that July. She then released two collaboration singles: "Treading Water" with Bamboo and "Alam" with John Roa of the hip-hop group Ex Battalion. In March 2024, Geronimo was honored with a Global Force Award at the Billboard Women in Music event at the YouTube Theater in Los Angeles, California, becoming the first Filipino to receive an award in the event show's history. At the Philippine edition of the event in the same month, Billboard Philippines named her as the Woman of the Year.

== Acting career ==
=== 2003–2007: Beginnings ===
In 2003, Geronimo made her film debut in the family drama Filipinas. Its soundtrack includes Geronimo's rendition of "Paano Kita Mapasasalamatan?". Also in 2003, she starred in the superhero film Captain Barbell, based on the superhero of the same name. The following year, she appeared in another superhero film Lastikman: Unang Banat, based on Mars Ravelo's comics superhero Lastikman, playing the love interest of the title character (played by Mark Bautista).

In 2005, Geronimo starred in a leading role on the television series Sarah the Teen Princess. In 2006, Geronimo starred in the primetime soap opera Bituing Walang Ningning, a remake of the 1985 film of the same name. Torre noted Geronimo's versatility but dismissed her performance, adding that she needed improvements for her acting. The following year, she starred in the television series Pangarap na Bituin, which is loosely based on the 1986 film Sana'y Wala Nang Wakas. She co-starred alongside Maja Salvador and Rica Peralejo as three sisters who were orphaned and separated after their parents died in the Mayon Volcano eruption. Initially resentful after her separation, Geronimo's character was raised by a musician, who inspired her to pursue a music career. The series received one of the highest Nielsen ratings for a Philippine television series pilot episode with a reported 35.9 percent viewership. It was also submitted for consideration for Best Telenovela at the 36th International Emmy Awards. Torre wrote that Geronimo "shouldn't be made to play truly challenging roles before she's ready to do full justice to them."

=== 2008–2013: Box office successes ===
The Cathy Garcia-Molina-directed film A Very Special Love (2008) featured Geronimo in a lead role opposite John Lloyd Cruz. She played Laida Magtalas, a college graduate who became assistant to a magazine editor (John Lloyd Cruz). When asked about her role, Geronimo said she was at first reluctant to work with him. The two previously collaborated in an episode of the drama anthology series Maalaala Mo Kaya. Film critic Karen Caliwara praised Geronimo for her acting versatility and compared her character to Anne Hathaway's roles in The Princess Diaries (2001) and The Devil Wears Prada (2006). The film was a commercial success, grossing ₱179 million (US$3.2 million) at the box office, earning her the Box Office Entertainment Award for Box Office Queen. She reprised her role in its sequel, You Changed My Life, saw Geronimo reprise her role of Laida Magtalas, who was promoted to the executive of a magazine she previously worked on in the previous film. It was also a commercial success, grossing ₱209 million (US$3.7 million) at the box office, and Geronimo was consequently crowned Box Office Queen at the Box Office Entertainment Awards for the second time. In 2010, she starred in the musical drama series 1DOL. Next, she co-starred alongside Judy Ann Santos in the comedy Hating Kapatid.

In 2011, she co-starred alongside Gerald Anderson in Catch Me, I'm in Love. Writing for the Philippine Entertainment Portal, Nica Tomines remarked, "Sarah effortlessly conveys the emotions of a girl who falls in love for the first time, and she falls real hard." The film's soundtrack included a cover of "Fallin'", which won Favorite Media Soundtrack at the 2012 Myx Music Awards. Next, she played a radio DJ in Won't Last A Day Without You. Abigail Mendoza of the Philippine Entertainment Portal described Geronimo's performance as an improvement to her previous film, adding that she "establish[ed] her knack for drama and comedy, [and] romantic comedies prove to be her forte".

The final installment in the A Very Special Love series, It Takes a Man and a Woman (2013), saw Geronimo and John Lloyd Cruz reprise their respective parts as Laida Magtalas and Miggy Montenegro, who had already ended their relationship, and are forced to work together with Miggy's girlfriend (played by Isabelle Daza) to save Miggy's business. The film became Geronimo's biggest commercial success to date, grossing ₱405 million (US$7.2 million) in the box office, making it the highest-grossing Philippine film at the time. Geronimo was also named Box Office Queen for the third time in her career, and won the Golden Screen Award for Best Actress.

=== 2014–present: Romance films and dramas ===
In 2014, Geronimo starred alongside Martin in the romantic drama Maybe This Time. Julia Allende wrote that Geronimo's performance is "just about as delightful" compared to her previous performances. For its soundtrack, Geronimo also covered the song "Maybe This Time", originally performed by Michael Martin Murphey in 1983; the cover became a sleeper hit in 2024. She next co-starred alongside Piolo Pascual in The Breakup Playlist (2015), for which she earned a nomination for the Star Awards for Best Actress. Geronimo reunited with John Lloyd Cruz in Finally Found Someone (2017). Geronimo stated that the story and characters were different from those of the A Very Special Love film trilogy, and that she wanted to play more mature roles in films. Asilo described Geronimo's performance as being "lovelier than ever" compared to her previous performances, while Rappler's Oggs Cruz dismissed the film as lacking originality. The film was commercially successful, grossing ₱316.5 million at the box office.

Geronimo played the lead role in Joyce Bernal's Miss Granny, an adaptation of the 2014 South Korean film of the same name. In the film, Fely (Nova Villa), a 70-year-old woman, gets transformed into her 20-year-old self after a visit to a photo studio. To prepare for this, Geronimo visited retirement homes and studied Villa's mannerisms so that she could emulate them in her performance. She said of her character: "This is my first time to be a mom [and] to be a grandmother ... But it's very challenging for me to imagine that I'm already old." Critics reviewed the film positively, and likened and compared Geronimo's voice to that of Villa. Film critic Oggs Cruz wrote: "[Miss Granny] is more a spotlight as to what kind of artist Geronimo has become." She also recorded the songs "Kiss Me, Kiss Me" and "Isa Pang Araw" for the film's soundtrack, which won the Best Performance by a Female Recording Artist and Best Song Written for Movie, TV, or Stage Play at the 2019 Awit Awards. Gil likened and compared the soundtrack to Filipino pop music from the 1960s and the 1970s. For the film, Geronimo subsequently won the Star Award for Best Movie Actress.

Directed by Perci Intalan and Jun Robles Lana, Unforgettable (2019) featured Geronimo as an autistic woman who finds a stray dog and takes care of it, and brings it while traveling to Baguio to see her sick grandmother in a hospital. In preparation for her role, she met with people on the autism spectrum. Unforgettable received mixed reviews; The Philippine Star's Ferdinand Topacio criticized the film's plot but praised Geronimo's performance, while Oggs Cruz described the plot as "pleasantly uncomplicated", drawing comparisons to the Philippine films Magnifico (2003) and The Blossoming of Maximo Oliveros (2005). She earned a nomination for Movie Actress of the Year at the 36th Star Awards for Movies.

Geronimo will star in a Philippine adaptation of the South Korean film Wonderful Nightmare (2015), and is set to co-star with John Lloyd Cruz in an untitled upcoming film.

== Artistry ==
"Initially, no amount of vocal bravado could give [Geronimo] the lived-in sensibility and vocal pizzazz that her first recording efforts—despite their chart-topping popularity and brisk sales—sorely lacked ... [She] has subtly shown that there is more to her than her Pied Piper-like ability to turn sappy lyrics and hum-worthy melodies into bestselling hits."

— The Philippine Daily Inquirer's Rito Asilo on Geronimo's evolving artistry

=== Influences ===
Geronimo's father introduced her to music at a young age. In a 2004 interview with the Philippine Daily Inquirer, she recalled that she practiced singing with her father, and cited Jose Mari Chan's "Christmas in Our Hearts" as one of the first songs she was familiar with. She also cited Louie Reyes's "Light of a Million Morning" as the "song of [her] life". Growing up, she listened to the music of Michael Jackson. Her musical inspiration varies from classic musicians like Frank Sinatra, Tom Jones, The Beatles, Elvis Presley, and the Bee Gees, to pop and R&B singers like Whitney Houston and Celine Dion. She has also cited singers Sharon Cuneta, Lea Salonga, and Regine Velasquez as role models, adding that the latter made her realize the value of hard work in pursuing a career in music. She also expressed interest in collaborating with him on a concert. The two did eventually perform a concert together in 2023.

Her 2018 single "Sandata" takes influences from synth-pop music of the 1980s, whereas her contributions to the Miss Granny soundtrack was influenced by 1960s and 1970s music from Filipino artists, including Nora Aunor and Pilita Corrales. Geronimo also paid homage to pop-rock artists, specifically singer-songwriter Rico Blanco, the former lead vocalist of Rivermaya from 1994 to 2007, by performing a cover of "Your Universe" from Blanco's solo album of the same title, and The Dawn, by co-performing the band's single "Salamat" at the 2023 FIBA Basketball World Cup at the Philippine Arena in Bocaue, Bulacan.

=== Musical style and themes ===
Geronimo's music is generally pop, but she has also incorporated R&B and EDM into her material. Geronimo has drawn comparisons to Beyoncé for her stage presence and live performances, frequently performing her songs. Initially, Geronimo primarily recorded sentimental ballads, and is renowned for her vocal range and belting technique, the latter of which was popularized and highly influenced by Regine Velasquez. Nestor Torre Jr. of the Philippine Daily Inquirer said of the comparison: "[Velasquez]'s belting became so popular that her successor, Sarah Geronimo, imitated her..." Producer Christian De Walden said of Geronimo's voice: "The personality of her voice is phenomenally distinct. ... People who really know music can tell [her] voice is her own." For Taking Flight, Gil praised Geronimo for "toning down the birit [belting] and bringing out her own style". According to the Philippine Daily Inquirer's Allan Policarpio, "The [early] years saw [Geronimo] dialing down her vocals and veering away from the [belting]-style singing that proved to be harmful to her instrument. But just because she doesn't do it as much doesn't mean she can't handle big diva songs anymore."

Later in her career, Geronimo ventured into "catchy, upbeat modern pop [tracks]", primarily influenced by R&B and EDM. Critics were appreciative of her transition to "upbeat" and "mid-tempo" tracks, and regarded it as a bold reinvention of her artistry. (Note: Attributed to multiple references:) She explored themes of love and relationship on "Cuore". On "Sandata", Geronimo delved into the themes of mental and psychological challenges, and empowerment. Regarding her songwriting for the track "Make Me Yours", Geronimo said that it was her dream to compose her own song. At the suggestion of Vic del Rosario, she wrote the lyrics for the track, while Louie Ocampo composed the song's melody.

== Public image and impact ==
"When I won [Star For A Night] back in 2003 ... [m]y manager made sure that I would be a multimedia artist, so I was doing everything at the same time — movies, concerts, commercials ... [and] hosting ... It feels great because you have this apparent sense of freedom ... now that you're free, now that you have all this time [and space] to grow."

— Geronimo on her career

Geronimo has been regarded as one of the most accomplished entertainers of her generation. Media publications have referred her as the country's "Popstar Royalty", (Note: Attributed to multiple references:) and classified her as a triple threat entertainer. (Note: Attributed to multiple references:) A critic from ABS-CBN News wrote that she "prove[d] that every singer, to be considered successful, can hit the high notes in any song." The Philippine Star's Patricia Esteves wrote, "That Sarah chose her own songs worked to her advantage because she was able to deliver heartfelt, soulful renditions. Because every song is meaningful and personal to her, Sarah was able to connect with the audience and display the right emotion." Allan Policarpio wrote: "[Geronimo] revisited some of the songs she used to sing when she was starting out ... But [later on, she] sang [them] with none of the affectations she used to put on."

According to Billboard Philippines, "[Geronimo] is a multi-talented artist who is able to successfully cross both the music and movie industries having starred in top-grossing movies and popular television shows all the while maintaining a stellar music career ... She also serves as an inspiration to many aspiring young artists and actively participates in helping shape the next generation of Filipino talents." Jason Dy has stated Geronimo promoted the value of hardwork and craft while Morisette said that she was likened or compared to Geronimo in terms of her voice. Darren Espanto credited Geronimo for learning about "sing[ing] from the heart". Other entertainers who cited Geronimo as an influence or inspiration include Charice Pempengco and Maymay Entrata. Singer Regine Velasquez, whom she cited as a major influence, declared that Geronimo is the "queen of [the entertainment] industry". Though reluctant to discuss about her personal life, she said of her image: "It’s a bit hard although I’d like to become a role model. I rather take it as a big challenge because it is probably my purpose being here in this [professional] industry." Her early life and breakthrough were dramatized in an episode of the drama anthology series Magpakailanman, where she was played by the singer-actress Kyla.

In December 2009, Geronimo received a star on the Philippines' Walk of Fame. In 2014, she was named Yes! magazine's Most Beautiful Star. Forbes Asia listed her among the 100 Digital Stars in 2020. In 2013, she was honored as an ambassador for music by the National Commission for Culture and the Arts (NCCA). In 2021, Tatler named her as one of the most influential people in Asia, and was also recognized as one of Asia's Leaders of Tomorrow in the publication's annual Gen T list.

== Other activities ==
Geronimo is a co-founder of G Productions, a production company that produces concerts and shows. The formation of the company was conceived by her husband Matteo Guidicelli during the outbreak of the COVID-19 pandemic, where they were filming music videos at home. In 2023, the two opened G Studios in Alabang, Las Piñas; it is described as a mixed-use building that "[would] cater to all advertising, media, and event needs". Geronimo said of her venture into business: "It started during the pandemic, [because our] materials ... we were doing it on our own." She also donated proceeds for her Perfect 10 concert in 2013 to the victims of Typhoon Haiyan (Yolanda), which is one of the deadliest typhoons recorded in the Philippines. (Note: Attributed to multiple references:) Geronimo has also been a spokesperson for various brands, including Jollibee, TNT, Shopee, Banco de Oro (BDO), and Sun Life Financial.

== Personal life ==
Geronimo became a born-again Christian in 2007; she regularly attends the Victory Christian Fellowship.

Before principal photography for You Changed My Life commenced, Geronimo was romantically involved with Rayver Cruz. In 2014, she stated that she had been in a relationship Matteo Guidicelli since 2013. They met in 2011 during production of Catch Me, I'm in Love. Geronimo announced her engagement on November 7, 2019, and they married on February 20, 2020, in a private ceremony in Taguig. Guidicelli admitted of having a crush on his wife prior to them being a couple and he also revealed that they placed God at the center of their relationship.

== Achievements ==
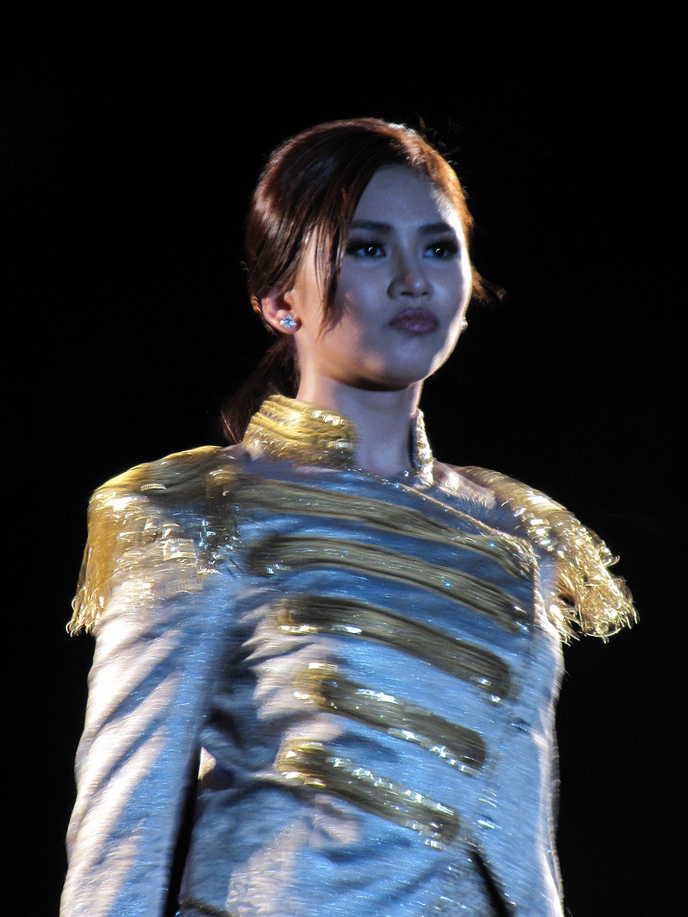
Geronimo in 2011

Throughout her career, Geronimo has received many accolades and honors, including 16 Awit Awards, 6 Aliw Awards, 15 Star Awards, (Note: 11 Star Awards for Music, 4 Star Awards for Movies) and 28 Myx Music Awards. She was also honored as the Best Asian Artist at the Mnet Asian Music Awards in 2012, the MTV Europe Music Award for Best Southeast Asian Act in 2014, Best-Selling Filipino Artist at the World Music Awards, and Best Asian Performer at the 2016 Classic Rock Roll of Honour Awards, in addition to nominations for Favorite Asian Act at the 2013 Kids' Choice Awards, and for the Best Female Artist, Best Live Act, and Entertainer of the Year at the World Music Awards in 2013, Geronimo was also a recipient of the FAMAS Award's Golden Artist in 2009. In 2024, she was honored with the Global Force Award during the Billboard Women in Music event in Los Angeles.

As an actress, Geronimo was named the Box Office Entertainment Award for Box Office Queen three times for her performances in the films A Very Special Love, You Changed My Life, and It Takes a Man and a Woman. Her television acting credits include Sarah the Teen Princess, Bituing Walang Ningning, Pangarap na Bituin, and 1DOL. Geronimo was awarded the Star Award for Movie Actress of the Year for her performance in Miss Granny, in addition to nominations for the same category for her roles in The Breakup Playlist and Unforgettable.

== Discography ==
- Popstar: A Dream Come True (2003)
- Sweet Sixteen (2004)
- Becoming (2006)
- Taking Flight (2007)
- Just Me (2008)
- Music and Me (2009)
- One Heart (2011)
- Expressions (2013)
- Perfectly Imperfect (2014)
- The Great Unknown (2015)
- This 15 Me (2018)

== Filmography ==
- A Very Special Love (2008)
- You Changed My Life (2009)
- Catch Me, I'm in Love (2011)
- Won't Last a Day Without You (2011)
- It Takes a Man and a Woman (2013)
- Maybe This Time (2014)
- The Breakup Playlist (2015)
- Finally Found Someone (2017)
- Miss Granny (2018)
- Unforgettable (2019)
