= Dati-Dati =

2022 song by Sarah Geronimo

Single by Sarah Geronimo
- Language: Filipino
- Genre: P-pop, Disco
- Length: 5:42
- Label: Viva Records, G Productions
- Songwriter: Jin Chan
- Producers: Su Ganade, Dylan Graham

Sarah Geronimo singles chronology
"Your Universe" (2020)	"Dati-Dati" (2022)	"Cuore" (2022)

"Dati-Dati" is a song by Filipino performer Sarah Geronimo. Written by Jin Chan, it was released on October 7, 2022 under Viva Records and G Productions.

== Video ==
The music video was conceptualized by Geronimo and directed by Jay Ar Vlillarojas with dance cherography by Georcelle Dapat-Sy. The video also features G-Force dancers. It premiered on YouTube on October 29, 2022.

== Live performances ==
Geronimo recorded a live performance that was aired on ASAP Natin 'To on November 7, the video was later posted on Geronimo's YouTube channel as the official performance video of the song. Geronimo took ASAP stage on December 12 to perform the song. The performance sparked the #DatiDatiDanceChallenge on video sharing platform TikTok. On December 23, Geronimo made a rare appearance on It's Showtime to perform the song.

== Reception ==
After Geronimo's performance on It's Showtime, the song instantly trended on video-sharing platform TikTok, with users dancing to the song, fueling the "Dati-Dati Dance Challenge." Some of the notable names who took on the challenge are Marian Rivera and Maja Salvador who appeared on a TikTok video with Georcelle Dapat-Sy, Bini member Sheena Catacutan, P-pop group BGYO, singer Lyca Gairanod and social media personality Mimiyuuuh who did the dance challenge with Geronimo herself. K-pop idols such as Choi Min-ho and Yoona also took on the dance challenge during their separate fan-meet events in Manila on January and March respectively.

Sarah Geronimo won Best Performance by A Female Recording Artist for the song at the 2023 Awit Awards. CNN Philippines named Dati-Dati as one of the best songs released in 2022.

== Awards and nominations ==
Year	Awards ceremony	Award	Results
2023	WPVR New York Awards	P-Pop Song of the Year	Won
2023	Big, Bold, Brave Awards	Gen Z-Approved Hit	Nominated
2023	VIllage Pipol Choice Awards	OPM Song of the Year	Nominated
2023	VIllage Pipol Choice Awards	Composer of the Year (for Jin Chan)	Nominated
2023	Awit Awards	Best Performance By A Female Recording Artist	Won
2023	Awit Awards	People's Voice Favorite Female Artist	Won
2023	Awit Awards	People's Voice Favorite Song	Nominated
2024	Wish Music Awards	Pop Song of the Year	Nominated
