= Catch Me... I'm in Love =

- Theatrical movie poster
- Directed by: Mae Czarina Cruz
- Written by: Mel Mendoza-del Rosario
- Produced by: Marizel Samson-Martinez; Vincent del Rosario; Veronique del Rosario-Corpus
- Starring: Sarah Geronimo; Gerald Anderson
- Cinematography: Manuel Teehankee
- Edited by: Marya Ignacio
- Music by: Cesar Francis S. Concio
- Production companies: ABS-CBN Film Productions, Inc.; Viva Films
- Distributed by: Star Cinema; Viva Films
- Release date: March 23, 2011
- Running time: 106 minutes
- Country: Philippines
- Language: Filipino
- Box office: ₱130 million (US$2,785,978.00)

Catch Me... I'm in Love is a 2011 Filipino romantic comedy film directed by Mae Czarina Cruz and starring Sarah Geronimo and Gerald Anderson. It was released on March 23, 2011. This was the first team-up of Anderson and Geronimo on the silver screen; both of them already worked in a commercial advertisement.

== Plot ==
Roanne Sanchez (Sarah Geronimo), a young girl with high ideals about romance is assigned to accompany the spoiled son of the president, Enrique "Eric" Rodriguez III (Gerald Anderson) as he goes on an immersion trip. Coming from different worlds, the two find much to fight about, but sudden attraction between then soon gets the better of them.

== Cast ==
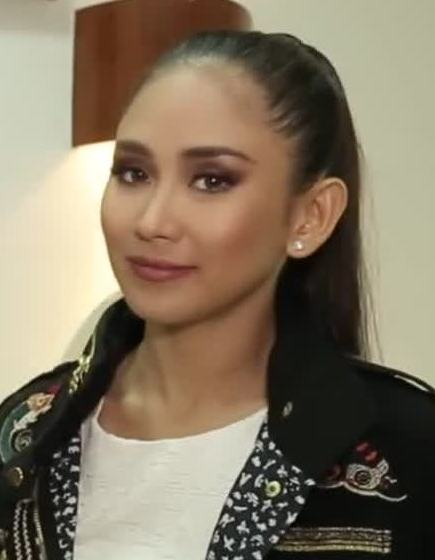
Sarah Geronimo portrays Roanne Sanchez

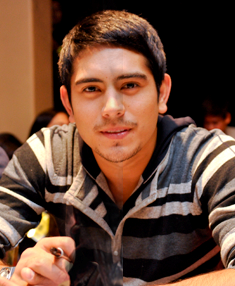
Gerald Anderson portrays Enrique "Eric" Rodriguez III

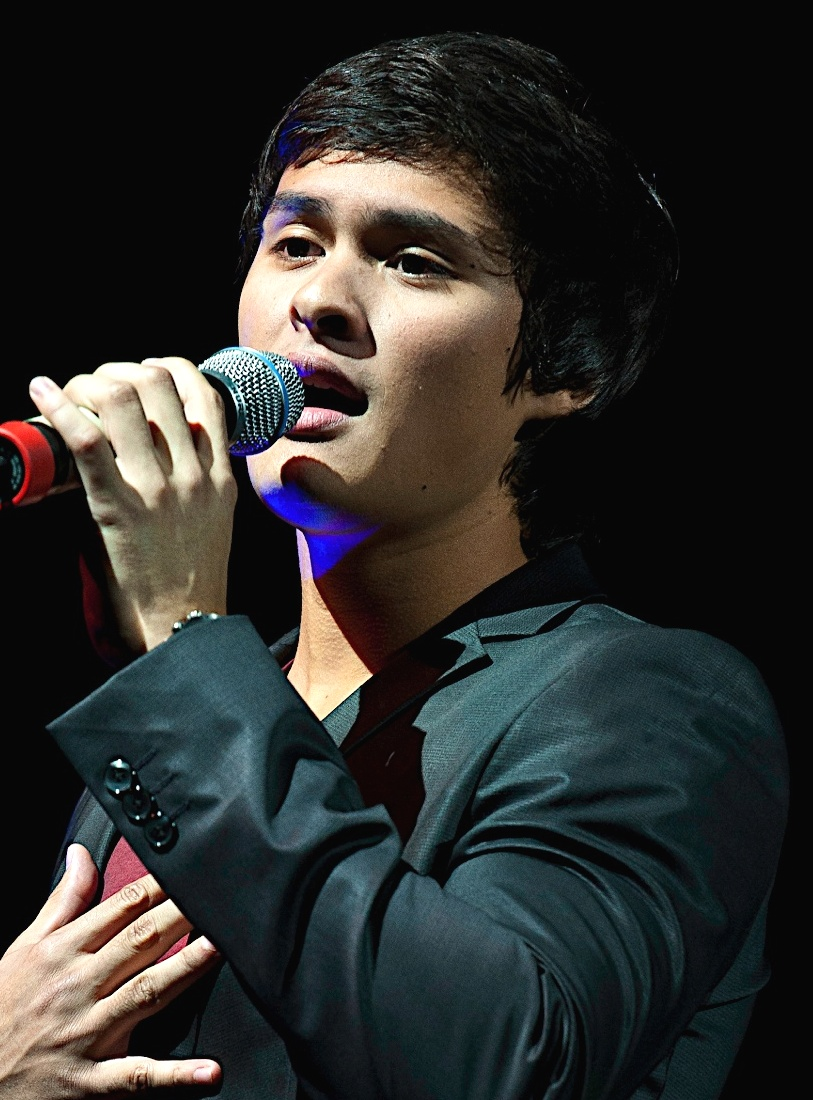
Matteo Guidicelli portrays Vitto

- Sarah Geronimo as Roanne Sanchez
- Gerald Anderson as Enrique "Eric" Rodriguez III
- Christopher de Leon as President Enrique Rodriguez Jr.
- Joey Marquez as Mr. Sanchez
- Dawn Zulueta as First Lady Elena Rodriguez
- Matteo Guidicelli as Vitto
- Arlene Muhlach as Mrs. Sanchez
- Ketchup Eusebio as Jojo
- Janus del Prado as Dan
- Dino Imperial as Rojie
- Sam Pinto as Nicole Morales
- Alchris Galura as Paolo
- Fred Payawan as PSG Head
- Ian "Duday" Galliguez as Girlie
- Charee Pineda as Charms
- Roden Araneta as NGO Supervisor
- Ariel "Hyubs" Azarcon as Mario
- Josef Elizalde as Erick's friend
- Princess Manzon as Cara
- Olive Cruz as Cate
- Amante Pulido as Mang Cris
- Idda Yaneza as Aling Bic-Bic
- Lito Legaspi as Governor Morales
- Buddy Palad as Mayor

Erik Santos and Gretchen Fullido appear in cameo roles as themselves.

== Reception ==
=== Critical response ===
Critical reception of the film has been mostly positive. PEP.ph stated that "Catch Me... I'm In Love is a simple love story with a lot of heart". Mario Bautista of People's Journal praised Sarah's acting abilities quoting "She's a natural comedian who's very charming in her hilarious scenes but she also handles her dramatic scenes well", remarked about Gerald Anderson saying "He certainly proves he can be on his own and not just identified with his love team with Kim Chiu" and lastly praised director Mae Cruz for the film by quoting "No doubt, this movie's intention is to just make kilig the viewers and Director Mae Cruz definitely succeeds in her intentions".

=== Box office ===
According to Philippine Box Office Index and Weekend Box Office of Box Office Mojo the film debuted at 15.95 million placing at number one over Sucker Punch which debuted at 14.14 million. As of May 11, 2011 after 31 days of screenings, the film has had a total gross of P 120.88 million.Philippine Box Office Weekends For 2021

== Awards ==
Year	Award-giving body	Category	Recipient	Result
2012	GMMSF Box-Office Entertainment Awards	Prince of Philippine Movies	Gerald Anderson	Won
2012	GMMSF Box-Office Entertainment Awards	Princess of Philippine Movies	Sarah Geronimo	Won
