= Becoming (Sarah Geronimo album) =

Studio album by Sarah Geronimo
- Released: July 20, 2006
- Recorded: 2005–2006
- Studio: Flamingo Café Recording Studios (Los Angeles, California); Subside Studios (Fiuggi, Italy); Amerasian Studios (Manila, Philippines)
- Genre: Pop
- Length: 51:43
- Language: English; Tagalog
- Label: Viva
- Producer: Christian de Walden; Carlo Nasi; Vic del Rosario, Jr. (executive); Vincent del Rosario (executive); Baby A. Gil (associate)

Sarah Geronimo chronology
Sweet Sixteen (2004)	Becoming (2006)	Taking Flight (2007)

Singles from Becoming
- 1. "I Still Believe in Loving You" Released: 2006; 2. "Carry My Love" Released: 2006; 3. "Iingatan Ko (Ang Pag-ibig Mo)" Released: 2007

Professional ratings
Review scores
Source	Rating
OPMusikahan.com	4/5 stars

Becoming is the third studio album by Filipino singer Sarah Geronimo, released in the Philippines on July 20, 2006, by Viva Records. The album is Geronimo's first international release, produced by Christian de Walden and Carlo Nasi. To date, the album has reached Platinum by the Philippine Association of the Record Industry (PARI), selling 30,000 units in the Philippines.

== Singles ==
Becoming's carrier single, "I Still Believe in Loving You", was written by Christian de Walden. The album went gold on its first week of release, with sales of 15,000 units. The second single is the powerful ballad "Carry My Love", translated by Lori Barth, an English adaptation of the original Spanish song "Amor cobarde" by Marta Sanchez and written by Vito Mastrofancesco, Alberto Mastrofancesco and Carlos Toro. The third and final single of the album, "Iingatan Ko (Ang Pag-ibig Mo)", was also an English adaptation of a song originally sung by Betzaida. It was originally titled "Aluciname", written by Steve Singer and Claudia Brant and was translated to Tagalog by Jimmy Antiporda.

"Magliliwanag Rin... Muli" was also an adaption from another Marta Sanchez's single called "Lejos de aquella noche". The seventh and fourteenth tracks of the album are the same songs. "Ala-Ala Mo" was written by Dennis Clark and Steve Singer with Cecile Azarcon. While "So Heartbroken" is the English version of "Ala-Ala Mo", translated by Dennis Clark and Steve Singer.

== Commercial performance ==
In the Philippines, Becoming debuted at number eighteen on the Philippine Top Albums chart, The album had sold 15,000 copies on its first week being certified PARI, then on its second week it climbed on the top ten at number four position. On its third week, the album fall to number five position on the chart. The album left the top ten and fall to number fourteen on its seventh week on the chart. The album left the chart at number twenty position, it spent eight weeks on the chart. The album had sold 60,000 copies in the Philippines and certified 4× PARI Platinum.

== Track listing ==
#	Title	Writer(s)	Length
1	"I Still Believe in Loving You"	Lori Barth; Jimmy Borja; Ralph Stemmann	4:32
2	"Iingatan Ko (Ang Pag-ibig Mo)"	Borja; Claudia Brant; Steve Singer	3:52
3	"You Mean the World to Me"	Ann Marie Bush; Singer; Carlos Toro Montoro	3:47
4	"Carry My Love"	Alberto Mastrofrancesco; Vito Mastrofrancesco; Montoro	4:03
5	"After Love"	Christian de Walden; Mike Shepstone; Stemmann	3:57
6	"Baby Blue"	Bush; Singer	3:57
7	"Ala-Ala Mo"	Cecile Azarcon; Dennis Clarke; Singer	3:34
8	"And I'm in Love Again"	John O'Flynn; Montoro; Alfons Weindorf	3:37
9	"Kaibigan"	Azarcon; Clark; Singer	3:45
10	"Don't You Worry"	Barth; Vanni Giorgilli; Luigi Rana; Roberto Santini; Montoro	3:05
11	"Magliliwanag Rin... Muli"	Azarcon; Warren Ham; Singer	3:30
12	"Is This Love?"	Fabio Angelini; Barth; Clark; Nick Howard	3:09
13	"Peace Is All We Know"	David Bacon; Barth; Giorgilli; Stemmann	3:16
14	"So Heartbroken"	Clark; Singer	3:33

== Personnel ==
Credits were taken from Allmusic and Discogs.

Production

- David Bacon - engineer
- Lori Barth - English translations
- Dennis Clark - background vocals
- Walter Clissen - engineer
- Vincent del Rosario - executive producer
- Christian de Walden - producer, vocal arrangement
- Vanni G. - arranger
- Bambi Jones - background vocals
- Brandy Jones - background vocals
- George Landress - engineer
- Sylvia Macaraeg - background vocals
- Paul Mirkovich - arranger
- Michael Mishaw - background vocals, vocal arrangement
- Carlo Nasi - producer
- Moy Ortiz - background vocals
- Tony Peluso - engineer
- Romer Rosellon - assistant engineer, mixing assistant
- Ronnie Salvacion - photography
- Ralf Stemmann - arranger, programming
- Luca Vittori - engineer, mixing

Musicians

- Alex Alessandroni - synthesizer, keyboards
- Vinnie Colaiuta - drums
- Sarah Geronimo - lead vocals
- James Harrah - guitar
- Randy Kerber - synthesizer, keyboards
- Abraham Laboriel, Sr. - bass
- Rafael Padilla - percussion
- Dean Parks - guitar
- Tim Pierce - guitar
- Ramon Stagnaro - guitar
- Leland Sklar - bass
- Neil Stubenhaus - bass
- Randy Waldman - piano
- Aaron Zigman - synthesizer, keyboards

== Certifications ==
Country	Provider	Certification	Sales
Philippines	PARI	4× Platinum	60,000+

== Release history ==
Region	Release date	Label	Edition	Catalogue
United States	May 1, 2006	Viva	Standard (Digital download)	
Philippines	July 20, 2006	Viva	Standard (CD)	VR CDS 06 213
