= The Breakup Playlist =

- Theatrical movie poster
- Directed by: Dan Villegas
- Screenplay by: Antoinette Jadaone
- Story by: Kriz G. Gazmen
- Produced by: Charo Santos-Concio; Malou N. Santos; Vic R. Del Rosario Jr.
- Starring: Piolo Pascual; Sarah Geronimo
- Cinematography: Dan Villegas
- Edited by: Marya Ignacio
- Music by: Emerzon Texon
- Production companies: ABS-CBN Film Productions; Viva Films
- Distributed by: Star Cinema
- Release date: July 1, 2015
- Language: Filipino
- Box office: ₱188 million (US$3.2 million)

The Breakup Playlist is a 2015 Filipino musical romantic drama film directed by Dan Villegas from a screenplay written by Antoinette Jadaone, based on a story concept by Kriz G. Gazmen. The film stars Piolo Pascual and Sarah Geronimo.

A co-production of ABS-CBN Film Productions and Viva Films and distributed by Star Cinema, the film was theatrically released on July 1, 2015.

== Plot ==
Starting from the present time and moving back to the past, the movie tells the story of an aspiring professional singer and a rock singer who collaborate on a song. As they work on their song, they start to develop feelings for each other. But soon, different challenges like their families and their pride will get in between them.

== Cast ==
=== Main cast ===
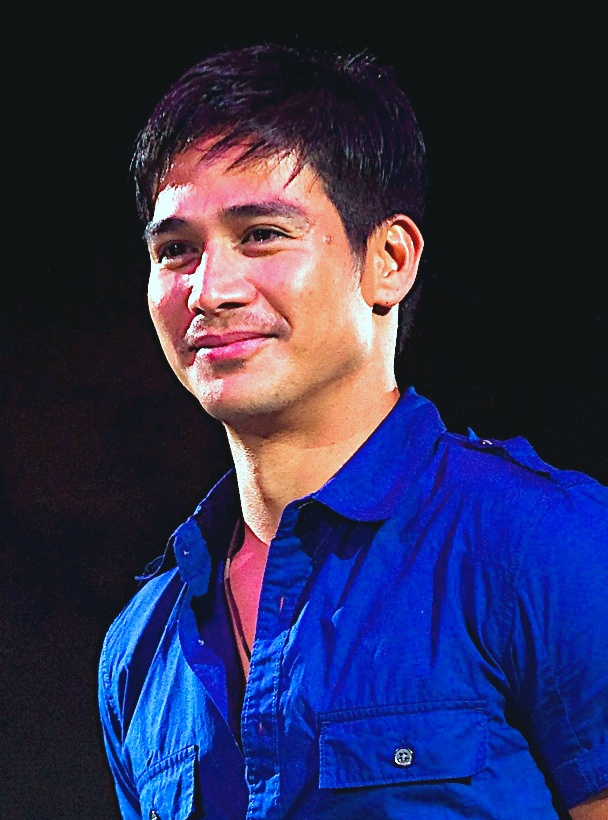
Piolo Pascual portrays Gino Avila

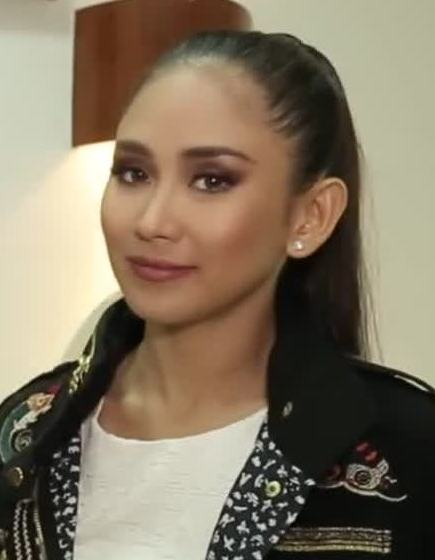
Sarah Geronimo portrays Trixie David

- Piolo Pascual as Gino Avila
- Sarah Geronimo as Trixie David

=== Supporting cast ===
- Rio Locsin as Marissa David
- Dennis Padilla as Joey David
- Maris Racal as Janine
- Jan Marini as Adi
- Diego Loyzaga as Joshua
- Teddy Corpuz as Toffer
- Jett Pangan as Lester
- Cris Villonco as Jing
- Basti Artadi as Caloy
- Annicka Dolonius as Ria
- Anna Luna as Cathy
- Badji Mortiz as Saul

=== Special participation ===
- Jamie Rivera

== Soundtrack ==
On June 30, 2015, Star Records released the official soundtrack album. Few weeks after, the album peaked at No. 1 on iTunes Philippines album chart and at No. 9 on Billboard World Albums.

The album includes the hit "Paano Ba Ang Magmahal?" sung by Piolo Pascual and Sarah Geronimo, it was written by Yeng Constantino and Jonathan Manalo. It was first recorded by Liezel Garcia and Erik Santos in 2012. "Wag Na Wag Mong Sasabihin" sung by Sarah Geronimo, written and originally popularized by Kitchie Nadal, "With A Smile" sung by Piolo Pascual, originally performed by Eraserheads, “Ikaw Lamang” sung by Geronimo and Pascual, "Patawarin" sung by Pascual, “Bida” and “Nagsimula Sa Puso” sung by Geronimo, the album also includes minus one of “Paano Ba Ang Magmahal."

== Reception ==
=== Box-office ===
The film was shown in just 180 cinemas nationwide but bested other international films on its first day opening gross with Php 15 million. The movie ruled the box-office chart taking the first spot over Hollywood movies. Due to positive reviews from the viewers, it was shown in more than 200 cinemas nationwide on its second day. The movie producers have not announced the official weekend gross of the movie making the online viewers abuzz. Since the movie bested its toughest competitor Terminator Genisys with around 1.5 million dollars or 65 million pesos, it is expected that the movie will reach the 100 million peso mark after its 5th day showing in cinemas given the positive online reviews from the critics and pictures from the viewers lining up the cinemas up to its last full show of the day.

On July 8, 2015, the producers announced that after 7 days, the movie had already breached the 100 million peso mark.

By its second weekend it dropped to second place behind Minions, later it dropped to third place behind Minions and Ant-Man during its third weekend and it dropped even further to fifth place for two consecutive weekends behind Minions, Ant-Man, Paper Towns and Mission: Impossible – Rogue Nation by its fourth and fifth weekends.

After five weeks in theatres, the movie grossed over Php 150 million pesos nationwide.

=== Critical reception ===
Due to its outstanding merit, The Breakup Playlist has received a Grade A rating from the Cinema Evaluation Board and received positive reviews from critics.

According to Rappler.com, The Breakup Playlist is a film that juggles commercial demands with the impulse for creative change. Sure, it may not be perfect, it may not dent the system or cause a revolution, but the film, with all its heart and soul in all the right places, is proof that even in the much-maligned arena of escapist entertainment, there is hope. There is substance."
