= Sweet Sixteen (Sarah Geronimo album) =

2004 album by Sarah Geronimo

Studio album by Sarah Geronimo
- Released: June 1, 2004 (US); November 16, 2004 (Philippines)
- Recorded: February–May 2004
- Studio: Amerasian Studios (Manila, Philippines); Saturno Music Production (Quezon City, Philippines)
- Genre: Pop
- Length: 69:28
- Language: English; Tagalog
- Label: Viva
- Producer: Vic del Rosario, Jr. (executive); Vincent del Rosario (executive); Eugene Villaluz (supervising); Baby A. Gil (associate)

Sarah Geronimo chronology
Popstar: A Dream Come True (2003)	Sweet Sixteen (2004)	Becoming (2006)

Singles from Sweet Sixteen
- 1. "Tunay Talaga" Released: 2004; 2. "How Could You Say You Love Me" Released: 2004; 3. "Hanggang Kailan" Released: 2004; 4. "Lumingon Ka Lang" Released: 2005; 5. "I Want to Know What Love Is" Released: 2005; 6. "Love Can't Lie" Released: 2005

Sweet Sixteen is the second studio album by the Filipino singer Sarah Geronimo, released in the Philippines on November 16, 2004, by Viva Records. To date, the album has reached triple platinum status by the Philippine Association of the Record Industry (PARI), selling more than 120,000+ copies in the Philippines.

== Singles ==
The album's carrier single is "How Could You Say You Love Me", written by Vehnee Saturno and Doris Saturno, who were also responsible for Geronimo's debut single "Forever's Not Enough". After a week of its release, it was certified gold and after a month, it was certified Platinum by the Philippine Association of the Record Industry (PARI), selling 30,000 copies. The second single was a dance hit written by novelty composer Lito Camo, entitled "Lumingon Ka Lang". The third single is a cover version—Foreigner's "I Want to Know What Love Is", which became a big hit. The last single released from the album was "Love Can't Lie", written by Agatha Obar.

Among other covers that she did for the album were "Love of My Life", which was originally done by Queen, "Before I Let You Go", which became a hit by labelmates Freestyle, "You Don't Know Me", which was originally recorded Ray Charles, and the operatic "Light of a Million Mornings".

== Commercial performance ==
In the Philippines, Sweet Sixteen debuted straight to number one on the Philippine Top Albums chart, it sold 15,000 copies on that week being certified PARI Gold. Then on its second week it disappeared on the chart, on its third week it climbed back on the chart at number four. The album spent only five weeks on the chart.

== Track listing ==
1. "How Could You Say You Love Me" (Vehnee Saturno, Doris Saturno) – 4:05
2. "Lumingon Ka Lang" (Lito Camo) – 3:43
3. "I Want to Know What Love Is" (Michael Leslie Jones) – 5:02
4. "Minsan" (Edwin Marollano) – 4:02
5. "Champion" (Yman Panaligan) – 3:26
6. "Love of My Life" (Freddie Mercury) – 3:52
7. "And You Smiled at Me" (Reuben Laurente) – 3:22
8. "Hanggang Kailan" (Ogie Alcasid) – 4:15
9. "Prinsesa ng Puso Mo" (Marollano) – 3:52
10. "Before I Let You Go" (featuring 17:28) (Top Suzara) – 4:24
11. "Love Can't Lie" (Agatha) – 4:47
12. "You're Taking My Breath Away" (Anne Marie Bush) – 3:50
13. "You Don't Know Me" (Arnold Eddy, Cindy Walker) – 3:19
14. "Sana" (Saturno, Popsie Saturno) – 3:41
15. "Kay Gandang Umaga" (Fragil) (with Mark Bautista) (Agatha, Luigi Lopez, Adrian Posse) – 3:46
16. "Light of a Million Mornings" (Cloringen, Mark Gersmehl, Hayes) – 4:43
17. "Tunay Talaga" (Charmee) – 2:46 (bonus track)
18. "Bulletin Song" – 2:27 (bonus track)

== Personnel ==
Credits were taken from Allmusic.

- 17:28 – lead vocals (track 10)
- Mark Bautista – lead vocals (track 15)
- Rico Bicol – digital mastering
- Arnold Buena – arranger
- Lito Camo – producer
- Vic del Rosario, Jr. – executive producer
- Vincent del Rosario – executive producer
- Christian de Walden – arranger
- Luis Espiritu – stylist
- Sarah Geronimo – lead vocals
- Reuben Laurente – background vocals
- Rudy Lozano – guitar
- Sylvia Macaraeg – background vocals
- Edwin Marollano – background vocals
- Noel Mendez – guitar
- Moy Ortiz – background vocals, vocal arrangement
- Eric Payumo – mastering and mixing
- Romer Rosellon – mixing
- Efren San Pedro – mixing
- Vehnee Saturno – digital mastering
- Eugene Villaluz – vocal supervision, supervising producer
- Baby A. Gil – associate producer

== Certifications ==
Country	Provider	Certification	Sales
Philippines	PARI	8× Platinum	120,000+

== Release history ==
Region	Release date	Label	Edition	Catalogue
United States	June 1, 2004	Viva	Standard (Digital download + bonus tracks)	
Philippines	November 16, 2004	Viva	Standard (CD + bonus tracks)	VR CDS 04 146
Philippines	November 16, 2004	Viva	Standard (Cassette + bonus tracks)	VR CAS 04 146
Philippines	December 11, 2004	Viva	Standard (Digital download + bonus tracks)	
