= You Changed My Life =

- Theatrical release poster
- Directed by: Cathy Garcia-Molina
- Screenplay by: Carmi Raymundo; Chie E. Floresca; Norissa R. Soriano
- Based on: Characters created for the screen by Raz de la Torre
- Produced by: Vincent del Rosario; Veronique del Rosario-Corpus
- Starring: John Lloyd Cruz; Sarah Geronimo
- Cinematography: Manuel Teehankee
- Edited by: Marya Ignacio
- Music by: Jessie Lasaten
- Production companies: Star Cinema; Viva Films
- Distributed by: Star Cinema; Viva Films
- Release date: February 25, 2009
- Running time: 111 minutes
- Country: Philippines
- Languages: Filipino; English
- Box office: ₱232,209,842.00 (US$4,724,411.00)

You Changed My Life is a 2009 Filipino romantic comedy film directed by Cathy Garcia-Molina and starring John Lloyd Cruz and Sarah Geronimo. It is the sequel to the 2008 film A Very Special Love.

It received an “A” rating from the Cinema Evaluation Board of the Philippines.

Filming began in November 2008, and it was released on February 25, 2009, by Star Cinema and Viva Films. The film surpassed Sukob to become the highest grossing Filipino film at the time until it was surpassed by No Other Woman (2011). More newer films have surpassed the film. It is currently the twenty-first highest grossing Filipino film of all time.

A sequel, It Takes a Man and a Woman, was released on March 30, 2013.

== Plot ==
It has been six months since Laida Magtalas and Miggy Montenegro became a couple. Laida was promoted from executive assistant to accounts executive, while Miggy has been doing well as he is being mentored by his older brother Art Montenegro. Laida gets an offer from her aunt to work in Canada where she is given a good recommendation.

Miggy's father vouches for his promotion as general manager of the family's industrial laundry business in Laguna but this also prompts a few hesitations from Art. The promotion proves difficult for the couple's relationship as a result of time constraints and the relationship suffers from the pressures of being apart. Their relationship becomes even more troubled with the introduction of Macoy. Macoy is Laida's long time friend whom she broke up with after he did not keep his promise of them going together to the same college. Their situation turns worse when Miggy has to fix a few issues in the plant after accepting orders from his brother Art's ex-girlfriend, Christina. His company's demand volume is too much for their manpower thus making some workers unhappy which leads to a labor strike. His father steps in and helps resolve the issue but Miggy has to set expectations for the clients affected by the strike. Those business meetings which preceded prompts Miggy to almost miss a wedding that Laida and he would go to. He arrives too late for the wedding and sees Laida crying with Macoy beside her. After Miggy and Laida have a heated argument, both of them decide to separate for a period of time.

The industrial laundry business is soon working at optimum efficiency which makes his brother trust him more, to the point of having him take over the family telecom stake in China. In the Montenegro group of companies annual general meeting, Laida sees Miggy for the first time after the argument, with Laida simply saying "Good morning, Sir", then leaving the venue right away. At the actual meeting, Miggy is announced as the officer in charge of the telecoms business.

Macoy talks sense to Laida to go back and pursue Miggy. She meets Miggy in the garden where she says she still loves him. Miggy suggests that it will be a more challenging time for them, but he also says he loves her. Afterwards, the two share a kiss with each other.

== Cast ==
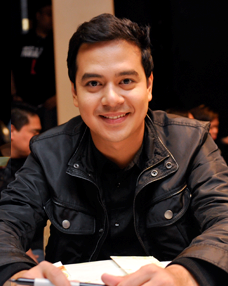
John Lloyd Cruz portrays Miguel "Miggy" Montenegro

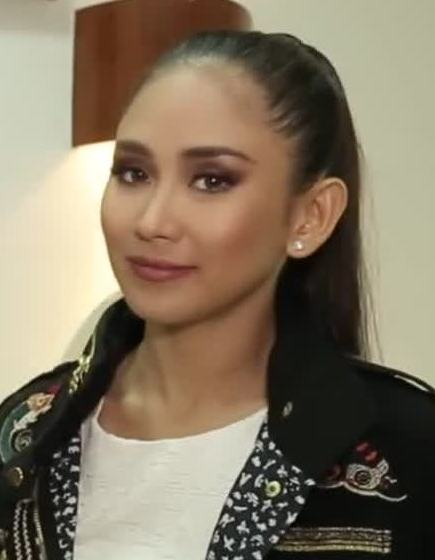
Sarah Geronimo portrays Adelaida "Laida" Magtalas

=== Main cast ===
- John Lloyd Cruz as Miguel "Miggy" Montenegro
- Sarah Geronimo as Adelaida "Laida" Magtalas

=== Supporting cast ===
- Dante Rivero as Luis Montenegro
- Rowell Santiago as Arturo "Art" Montenegro
- Matet de Leon as Zoila
- Bernard Palanca as Mondy
- Joross Gamboa as John Rae
- Gio Alvarez as Vincent
- Al Tantay as Tomas Magtalas
- Irma Adlawan as Baby Magtalas
- Beverly Salviejo as Manang Vida
- Bing Pimentel as Alice Montenegro
- Johnny Revilla as Roger Montenegro
- Rayver Cruz as Marcelo "Macoy" Romero
- Miles Ocampo as Rose Magtalas
- Arno Morales as Stephen Magtalas
- Andre Garcia as Lion Magtalas
- Daphne Oseña-Paez as Anya Montenegro
- Mikee Cojuangco-Jaworski as Christina

== Reception ==
The film was graded "A" by the Cinema Evaluation Board. The Philippine Entertainment Portal describe the film as "Entertaining and engaging!". ReelAdvice.net gave the film 3.5/5 ratings.

=== Box office ===
The film was a huge box office success, earning ₱ 232,209,842 in its seven weeks run at the box office.

== Home video ==
The film was made available on original DVDs and VCDs distributed by Viva Video, Inc. and Star Home Video in April 2009.

== Accolades ==
Year	Award-Giving Body	Category	Work	Result
2010	GMMSF Box-Office Entertainment Awards	Box Office King	John Lloyd Cruz	Won
2010	GMMSF Box-Office Entertainment Awards	Box-Office Queen	Sarah Geronimo	Won
2010	GMMSF Box-Office Entertainment Awards	Film Director of the Year	Cathy Garcia Molina	Won
