= It Takes a Man and a Woman =

- Theatrical movie poster
- Directed by: Cathy Garcia-Molina
- Written by: Carmi Raymundo
- Based on: Characters created for the screen by Raz de la Torre
- Produced by: Vincent del Rosario; Veronique del Rosario-Corpus
- Starring: John Lloyd Cruz; Sarah Geronimo; Isabelle Daza
- Cinematography: Manuel Teehankee
- Edited by: Marya Ignacio
- Music by: Jessie Lasaten
- Production companies: ABS-CBN Film Productions, Inc.; Viva Films
- Distributed by: Star Cinema; Viva Films
- Release dates: March 30, 2013 (Domestic); April 12, 2013 (United States); April 18, 2013 (Middle East); April 25, 2013 (Canada)
- Running time: 127 minutes
- Country: Philippines
- Language: Filipino
- Box office: ₱387 million (Philippines); US$1,800,874 (North America)

It Takes a Man and a Woman is a 2013 Filipino romantic comedy film directed by Cathy Garcia-Molina and written by Carmi Raymundo. It is a sequel to two earlier films A Very Special Love (2008) and You Changed My Life (2009). John Lloyd Cruz and Sarah Geronimo reprise their roles as Miggy Montenegro and Laida Magtalas respectively. The film is set two years after their break-up which occurred in a depicted flashback scene following events (not shown) in the preceding film.

Released in the Philippines on March 30, 2013, It Takes a Man and a Woman was a major commercial success. The film grossed ₱387 million in domestic sales. It is the 2nd highest-grossing film and the highest-grossing Filipino film released in the Philippines in 2013. During the FAMAS Award in 2014, it received three nominations including Best Actor, Best Actress and Best Editing.

== Plot ==
The film follows Miggy and Laida's lives after their break-up from the second film. Miggy is now dating Belle, while Laida, who has become fiercer after living in the U.S., opposes Miggy's business decisions as they work in the same company. Through various events, they rediscover the true meaning of love. Two years later, Miggy, having lost the trust of board members after failing the aircraft business, seeks Laida's help. Laida returns from New York, stronger and seemingly moved on. Flashbacks reveal their relationship struggled when Laida's father cheated on her mother and Miggy's father had a heart attack. Laida, comforting her mother, misses the funeral, leading Miggy to be consoled by Belle, resulting in a kiss witnessed by Laida, who then breaks up with Miggy.

Miggy's life falls apart after losing Laida and his father, making him more stubborn. When Laida returns to Flippage, she dresses and speaks differently. The tension between them is palpable, and when trust is mentioned, Laida leaves the room, though she eventually returns to help. Laida distances herself from old friends and struggles with jealousy over Miggy and Belle's relationship.

After a disagreement over a project, Zoila and friends suggest a transformation theme for Laida, which Miggy supports. During a photoshoot, they struggle to capture Laida's true smile. Various attempts, including a rain dance by Miggy, fail. That evening, Miggy buys pizza for everyone, reminiscent of their past, but Laida refuses. Zoila and friends then sing "Kailan," Laida and Miggy's favorite song. Miggy's singing makes Laida teary-eyed, and he stops when he sees her unhappiness.

The next day, Miggy looks for Laida, who hands him a resignation letter. He chases her to the elevator and keeps them stuck inside. They argue about their past, with Laida explaining her sacrifices and Miggy blaming her for leaving. She walks out, leaving Miggy upset. Laida later reads about Miggy's struggles and they sit down to talk. Miggy explains his loss of confidence after his father's death and losing Laida, which led to losing the aircraft firm. Laida makes a truce and accepts his apology.

They fly to New York and end up staying in Laida's apartment due to hotel issues. Their meeting with MET gets canceled, so they tour New York. The next day, they're about to kiss when someone knocks on the door. They eventually present to MET with Belle and head home.

In the following days, Miggy realizes he still loves Laida and ends his relationship with Belle. In a board meeting, MET decides against publishing their magazine in the Philippines but agrees to a partnership with Flippage, on the condition that Laida returns to New York. At the airport, as Laida walks by, everyone sings "Kailan," her and Miggy's favorite song. Zoila, friends, and Miggy's family are present. Miggy asks Laida's parents for her hand in marriage. Laida's mother leaves the decision to her, and Laida agrees. They get married, and the story ends with their honeymoon.

== Cast ==
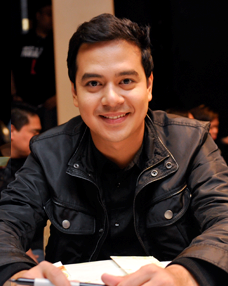
John Lloyd Cruz portrays Miguel "Miggy" Montenegro

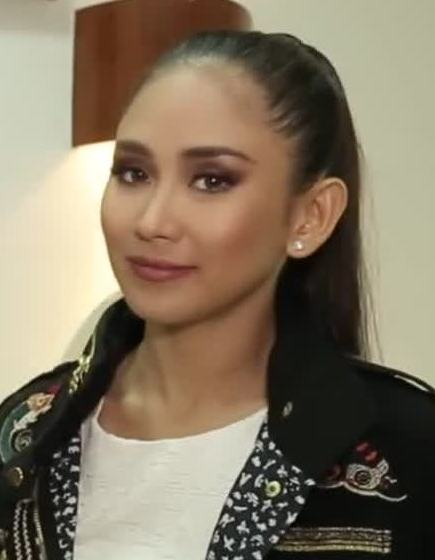
Sarah Geronimo portrays Adelaida "Laida" Magtalas

- John Lloyd Cruz as Miguel "Miggy" Montenegro. The youngest of the Montenegro family. In this film, he is in a relationship with Belle. He is having problems in the family after losing the aircraft and is trying to do everything to gain the trust back of the board members.
- Sarah Geronimo as Adelaida "Laida" M. Magtalas. Now a fiercer woman, as she has moved on after her breakup with Miggy. She is an EC in New York and comes back to the Philippines to help Flippage, the company where she first started. There are new changes in the Montenegro company, her friends, her family especially her relationship with Miggy.
- Isabelle Daza as Belle Laurel. Belle is Miggy's girlfriend. They hooked up after Miggy came back after looking for Laida in New York. Belle and Miggy had good relationship until Laida came back from America. It is revealed that she was the reason for the breakup between Miggy and Laida. Also, her and Miggy broke up and she left him but he came back for her. She follows Miggy to New York in Laida's apartment where she breaks the kiss moment between the two.
- Rowell Santiago as Arturo "Art" Montenegro. Art trusts Miggy more now and has got a bigger and fonder relationship with him since their father's death.
- Dante Rivero as Luis Montenegro
- Al Tantay as Tomas Magtalas
- Irma Adlawan as Baby Magtalas
- Joross Gamboa as John Rae
- Gio Alvarez as Vincent
- Matet de Leon as Zoila
- Miles Ocampo as Rose Magtalas
- Andre Garcia as Lio Magtalas. The little brother, still hoping for his sister and his idol Miggy to rekindle their relationship.
- Johnny Revilla as Roger Montenegro
- Bing Pimentel as Alice Montenegro
- Guji Lorenzana as Carlo
- Vangie Labalan as Manang
- Alchris Galura
- Gee-Ann Abrahan

== Music ==
"It Takes a Man and a Woman"

Single by Sarah Geronimo

from the album Expressions
- Released: April 2013
- Recorded: 2013
- Genre: Pop
- Length: 3:46
- Label: Viva Records
- Songwriters: Denny Randell; Letty Jo Randell

Sarah Geronimo singles chronology
"Bakit Pa Ba" (2012)	"It Takes a Man and a Woman" (2013)	"Ikot-Ikot" (2013)

The theme song of the film is of the same title, It Takes a Man and a Woman, which was originally recorded by American singer Teri DeSario from her first album Pleasure Train. Sarah Geronimo performed the vocals of the song and included it in her tenth studio album Expressions (2013).

== Release ==
=== Box office ===
It Takes a Man and a Woman had its general release on March 30, 2013, a Holy Saturday. It reportedly earned PHP 32.6 million (est. $800,000; nominal values) on its opening day and PHP 60,975,425 million ($1,496,829; nominal values) during its first week. The second-week run showed a notable margin as it sold 65.2% higher than its debut week. The film played for seven weeks in domestic theaters and had a total box-office gross of PHP 405M. It is the 2nd highest-grossing film and the highest-grossing Filipino film released in the Philippines in 2013. To date, the film is the 8th highest-grossing Filipino film of all-time.

=== Critical reception ===
The film has received mixed reviews from critics. Aaron Hillis of the Village Voice wrote: "The final leg of director Cathy Garcia-Molina's exceptionally broad, partly English-dubbed cockles-warmer of a trilogy outright apes Hollywood rom-com formulas with a personality so affably lobotomized it wouldn't dare frighten delicate tastes".

Philbert Ortiz Dy gave the film 3 out of 5 stars, saying, "There are plenty of sweet moments to be found in It Takes A Man and A Woman, but there’s a lot of bloat to get through[...] It might have done the film good to just take a more subdued approach, trusting in the talents of the two leads to provide the mainstream appeal. That said, the current approach still provides some charm. There’s just a sense that it could have been so much more". Likewise, Nestor Torre of the Philippine Daily Inquirer wrote: "To be sure, the film wins thematic points with its emphasis on the importance of forgiveness, of really moving on—so, when the constantly bickering ex-lovers finally face up to their hurts and/or guilt, the heretofore sluggish and unfocused drama finally hits viewers where they live, hurt and love. —Unfortunately, it’s too little, too late to save the film".

In a more positive view, It Takes a Man and a Woman received a grade of A from the Cinema Evaluation Board of the Philippines and a G rating by the Movie and Television Review and Classification Board.

=== Accolades ===
The film was earn some nominations and wins from award-giving bodies in the Philippines. These include three FAMAS Award nominations including Best Actor, Best Actress and Best Editing. It had eight nominations from Star Awards for Movies including one win for Isabelle Daza as New Movie Actress of the Year. The film had three nominations and wins from Golden Screen Awards: Best Motion Picture (Musical or Comedy), Best Performance by an Actor in a Leading Role (Musical or Comedy) for John Lloyd Cruz and Best Performance by an Actress in a Leading Role (Musical or Comedy) for Sarah Geronimo. In addition, due to its commercial success, the GMMSF Box-Office Entertainment Awards awarded the Box-Office King and Queen to Cruz and Geronimo; as well as the most popular screenwriter to Carmi Raymundo.
