= Popstar: A Dream Come True =

Studio album by Sarah Geronimo
- Released: September 11, 2003 (Philippines)
- Recorded: 2002–July 2003
- Genre: Pop
- Length: 65:07
- Language: English; Tagalog
- Label: Viva
- Producer: Vincent del Rosario; Veronique del Rosario-Corpus; Alwin Cruz

Sarah Geronimo chronology
Popstar: A Dream Come True (2003)	Sweet Sixteen (2004)

Singles from Popstar: A Dream Come True
- 1. "To Love You More" Released: 2003; 2. "Forever's Not Enough" Released: 2003; 3. "Broken Vow" Released: 2003; 4. "Paano Kita Mapasasalamatan" Released: 2003; 5. "Sa Iyo" Released: 2004; 6. "If Only" Released: 2004

Popstar: A Dream Come True is the debut studio album by the Filipino singer Sarah Geronimo, released in the Philippines on September 11, 2003, by Viva Records. It was produced by Vincent del Rosario. After winning the grand champion title on Star for a Night, she signed a recording contract with the label and immediately recorded and released her first album. It was a collaboration of the most respected composers Vehnee Saturno, Ogie Alcasid, George Canseco, Wency Cornejo and Jun Murillo. The album includes her winning cover version of the Celine Dion's hit single "To Love You More", which was also released as the first single. The album was a commercial success, peaking at number one in the Philippine Top 10 Albums chart, and remained at number one position for five weeks. It was the best selling album in the Philippines in 2003 and is considered the best-selling debut album in the Philippines selling more than 210,000 units which was certified 7× Platinum in 2006. By 2016, the album had sold 310,000 copies in the Philippines making it the eighth best-selling album there.

== Background ==
In 2002, the financial problems of Geronimo's family inspired her to compete in the Star for a Night competition, hosted by Regine Velasquez. At the age of 14, she won the competition, which included a PHP 1 million cash prize and a managerial contract with Vicente del Rosario, owner of Viva Entertainment. She was also given the title of "Popstar Princess". Her mother said, "Her cash prize in Star For a Night was a big help. This school year, we don't need to borrow money from other people for my children's tuition fees."

== Reception ==
The album performed well commercially and critically. At the 2004 Awit Awards, it received four nominations (Best Female, Best New Female, Best Dance for "Sa Iyo" and Song of the Year for "Forever's Not Enough"). Geronimo won Best Performance by a New Female Recording Artist and Best Dance Song. She lost the Best Female award to Lani Misalucha and the Song of the Year award to Parokya ni Edgar's "Mr. Suave".

== Commercial performance ==
Popstar: A Dream Come True entered the Philippine Top 10 Albums chart at number six, and after a week climbed to number one, replacing Parokya ni Edgar's Bigotilyo album. The album remained number one on the chart for five consecutive weeks until the week of December 15, 2003, making it the longest number one charting album and Geronimo's commercial success album. The album left the chart at number seven position, it spent a total of eleven weeks on the chart according to Titik Pilipino data. In 2006, the album had sold 210,000 copies in the Philippines being certified seven times Platinum there. To date, Popstar: A Dream Come True had sold more than 300,000 copies in the Philippines, making it the eighth best-selling album in the country.

== Track listing ==
1. "Just Believe" (Dennis Garcia) — 4:34
2. "If Only" (Ogie Alcasid) — 3:53
3. "Ibulong Sa Hangin" (Emil Pama) — 4:14
4. "Forever's Not Enough" (Vehnee Saturno, Doris Saturno) — 4:28
5. "It's All Coming Back To Me Now" (Jim Steinman) — 5:15
6. "Sa Iyo" (Jun Murillo) — 3:36
7. "Narito" (Alcasid) — 3:36
8. "I Will Do Anything for Love" (Steinman) — 5:19
9. "Twin Hearts" (featuring Devotion) (Wency Cornejo) — 3:39
10. "When I Met You" (Jim Paredes) — 4:30
11. "Broken Vow" (with Mark Bautista) (Walter Afanasieff, Lara Sofie Katy Crokaert) — 4:32
12. "Nananaginip ng Gising" (Jonathan Florido) — 4:21
13. "We Are Tomorrow" (Cornejo) — 4:02
14. "Paano Kita Mapasasalamatan" (George Canseco) — 4:15
15. "To Love You More" (Junior Miles, David Foster) — 4:38

== Charts ==
Chart (2003)	Peak position
Philippine Albums Chart	1
