= A Very Special Love =

- Theatrical movie poster
- Directed by: Cathy Garcia-Molina
- Written by: Raz Sobida dela Torre; Additional scenes and dialogue: Carmi G. Raymundo; Rose Colindres
- Produced by: Vincent del Rosario; Veronique del Rosario-Corpuz
- Starring: John Lloyd Cruz; Sarah Geronimo
- Cinematography: Manuel Teehankee
- Edited by: Marya Ignacio
- Music by: Jessie Lasaten
- Production companies: ABS-CBN Film Productions; Viva Films
- Distributed by: Star Cinema; Viva Films
- Release date: July 30, 2008
- Running time: 106 minutes
- Country: Philippines
- Language: Filipino
- Box office: ₱185,235,324.00(US$3,836,701.00)

A Very Special Love is a 2008 Filipino romantic comedy film directed by Cathy Garcia-Molina from a story and screenplay written by Raz S. de la Torre. The film stars John Lloyd Cruz and Sarah Geronimo in her first film under ABS-CBN's film studio as a lead star, the film revolves around an editorial assistant who finds out that she is going to work for the man of her dreams. In addition to the lead stars, the supporting cast includes Dante Rivero, Rowell Santiago, Bing Pimentel, Joross Gamboa, Al Tantay, and Irma Adlawan and a special participation of Agot Isidro.

A co-production of Star Cinema and Viva Films, the film was theatrically released in the Philippines on July 30, 2008, and later released in the United States on August 15. The successful results in the box office spawned two sequels: You Changed My Life, which was released on February 25, 2009, and It Takes a Man and a Woman which was released on March 30, 2013. Now, it currently holds the title of the seventh highest-grossing Filipino film of all time.

== Plot ==
Laida Magtalas is a modern-day Belle. "Miggy" is the youngest member of the Montenegro clan – a well-established family in the business. She applies as an Editorial Assistant at Miggy's newly launched men’s magazine, "Bachelor". Laida revels in working in such proximity with the man of her dreams.

The film opens with Laida starting out her day with a job interview with Flippage, owned and managed by her crush Miguel "Miggy" Montenegro. Unbeknownst to her, on the day of her interview, Miggy has a heated meeting with his creative team on the issue of Bachelor, Flippage’s men's magazine. Miggy’s mean demeanor and undermining of both his friend and editors cause a walkout of half of the team. In the middle of the chaos, Laida is hired on the spot after she presents Miggy with coffee left by an attendant who also walked out after being screamed at.

Laida remains blind to the fact that the Miggy of her dreams is very different from the real one. In reality, he is an unapologetic, hothead who always thinks he's in the right and is obsessed about making his magazine number one. Everyone is scared of him with the exception of the love-struck Laida, who adamantly defends him. Imperceptively, she caters to his every whim, even sending her in his absence on a date with his girlfriend, breaking her heart a little. Her colleagues question her unrelenting devotion to such a monster and when Laida continues to prove her loyalty to Miggy, gossip regarding her feelings for the boss starts to circulate.

However, the moment is short-lived, as the next day, after Laida makes a suggestion in regards to an article content that Miggy should put for the magazine, Miggy publicly humiliates her and her knowledge of sex and questions her virtue in front of the staff by making her say the word “Sex”. Miggy later embarrasses himself after realizing it was Laida who made the last-minute call to find a printing press to do a rush job on their magazine overhaul. After being chastised by Miggy, Laida finally sees him for the tyrant he is. Miggy then realizes why people are so put off by him.

Miggy tries to apologize to a disenchanted Laida, first by ordering pizza for the team and serving a slice to her, which Laida ignores. Laida is called to Miggy’s apartment but finds him ill with very little food or necessities and no one to care for him. Laida takes care of Miggy, missing her mother's birthday. Miggy wakes up and sees the exhausted Laida next to him patting his back in a motherly way. This prompts him to realize his feelings for Laida, igniting a change in him and wishing Laida to be closer to him, as well as being more friendly with the rest of his team. The productivity and atmosphere of the company also improve. Miggy becomes comfortable enough to tell Laida the truth about his past, that he was an illegitimate child of his father, who was later adopted into the main family after his mother's death, thus, his strong desire is to prove himself to his father and older brother. For the first time in his life, Miggy garners the strength to apologize and this new-found humility opens up a whole new world of "firsts" for Miggy. With Laida's help, Miggy slowly learns to be more of a team player and the true value of loyalty.

== Cast ==
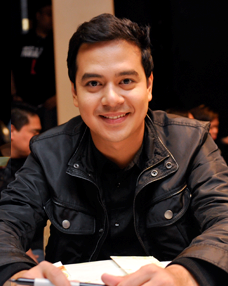
John Lloyd Cruz portrays Miguel "Miggy" Montenegro

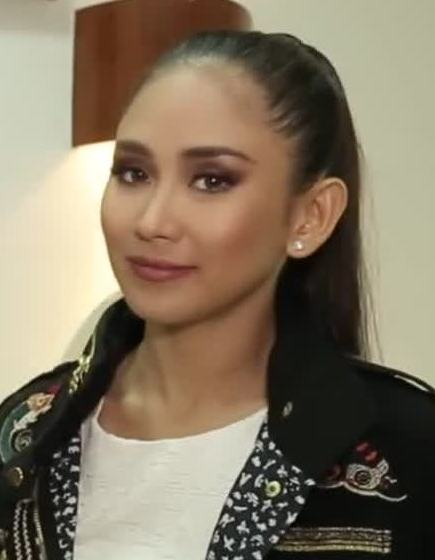
Sarah Geronimo portrays Adelaida "Laida" Magtalas

- John Lloyd Cruz as Miguel "Miggy" Montenegro
- Sarah Geronimo as Adelaida "Laida" Magtalas
- Dante Rivero as Luis Montenegro
- Rowell Santiago as Arturo "Art" Montenegro
- Matet de Leon as Zoila
- Bernard Palanca as Mondy
- Joross Gamboa as John Rae
- Gio Alvarez as Vincent
- Bing Pimentel as Alice Montenegro
- Will Devaughn as Cris
- Al Tantay as Tomas Magtalas
- Irma Adlawan as Baby Magtalas
- Miles Ocampo as Rose Magtalas
- Arno Morales as Stephen Magtalas
- Andre Garcia as Lion Magtalas
- Johnny Revilla as Roger Montenegro
- Daphne Oseña-Paez as Anya Montenegro
- Kalila Aguilos as Violy
- CJ Jaravata as Julian
- JP Pascual as Ronald
- Maris Dimayuga as Angie
- Gail Nicolas as Janis
- Paw Diaz as Mitch
- Valerie Weigmann (Marianna del Rio) as Dianne
- Precious Adona as Smilla Bring
- Agot Isidro as Miggy's mother (uncredited)

== Soundtrack ==
- "Very Special Love"
  Performed by Sarah Geronimo
  Composed by Michael Lloyd
  Published by Warner/Chappell Music Philippines
  Originally by Maureen McGovern
- "Kailan"
  Performed by Smokey Mountain
  Composed by Ryan Cayabyab
  Published by Filscap
- "Ngiti"
  Performed by Ronnie Liang
  Lyrics and music by Vince Katinday
  Arranged by Tito Rapadas
  Published by Universal Records

Note: The song "Very Special Love" (or sometimes called "A Very Special Love") rendition by Sarah Geronimo was also used as the official theme song/part of the official soundtrack for the GMA Network action-drama series Black Rider, which aired from November 6, 2023 to July 26, 2024.

== Reception ==
=== Box office results ===
The film was a huge box office success, it became the highest-grossing Filipino film of 2008. It earned ₱179,235,324 in its entire run.

=== Critical reception ===
Karen A.P. Caliwara, writing for Philippine Entertainment Portal, gave the film a positive review on the film and cited the cast, particularly Geronimo and Cruz's respective performances, the screenplay, the dialogue, and the impact on the cinematic audience as the reasons why the film is "a must-see movie".

=== Accolades ===
Year	Award-Giving Body	Category	Work	Result
2009	GMMSF Box-Office Entertainment Awards	Box Office King	John Lloyd Cruz	Won
2009	GMMSF Box-Office Entertainment Awards	Box Office Queen	Sarah Geronimo	Won
2009	GMMSF Box-Office Entertainment Awards	Most Popular Film Director	Cathy Garcia Molina	Won
2009	GMMSF Box-Office Entertainment Awards	Most Popular Screenwriter	Raz Sobida dela Torre	Won
