= The Voice Kids (Philippine TV series) season 7 =

Season of a Philippine television reality show

The Voice Kids
- Season 7
- Hosted by: Dingdong Dantes
- Coaches: Billy Crawford; Zack Tabudlo; Julie Anne San Jose; Ben&Ben
- Winner: Sofia Mallares
- Runners-up: Gianino Sarita; Marian Ansay; Yana Goopio

Release
- Original network: GMA Network
- Original release: September 14 – December 14, 2025

Season chronology
- ← Previous; Season 6

The seventh season of The Voice Kids, a reality competition show in the Philippines based on the Dutch TV series of the same title, is broadcast by GMA Network. It is hosted by Dingdong Dantes, with Billy Crawford and Julie Anne San Jose returning as coaches from the previous season; newcomers Zack Tabudlo and Ben&Ben's Paolo and Miguel Benjamin Guico, joined as new coaches. The season premiered on September 14, 2025, on the network's Sunday Grande sa Gabi line up. The season ended on December 14, 2025, with Sofia Mallares as the winner.

== Changes ==
=== Coaches and Hosts ===
Among the four coaches in the previous season, only Billy Crawford and Julie Anne San Jose remained in the panel, marking their second season appearance as coaches. Pablo and Stell both left the panel and were replaced by two new coaches, as well as the first season in the Philippine franchise of The Voice to feature a "double chair". On July 31, 2025, Zack Tabudlo and Ben&Ben's Paolo and Miguel Benjamin Guico were announced as new coaches. Tabudlo is the first alumni in the history of The Voice Philippines franchise to serve a coach (as he appeared in the inaugural season).

=== Coach replay ===
A new feature this season is the coach replay, where coaches can save an eliminated no-chair turner artist after their audition.

== Teams ==
Winner
Finalist
Eliminated in the Live Shows

Eliminated in the Sing-offs
Stolen in the Battles
Eliminated in the Battles

Coaches	Top 36 artists				
Billy Crawford (Team Bilib)					
Billy Crawford (Team Bilib)	Yana Goopio	Ahlia Chantale Encinares	Lovers Cabrera	Katniss Aveline Miranda	~~Thurd Jacob Casumpang~~
Billy Crawford (Team Bilib)	Angeline Aunzo	Athena Alexandra Omadto	Ava Towns	Venisse Rose Balderama	Ylyza Aquino
Zack Tabudlo (Project Z)					
Zack Tabudlo (Project Z)	Sofia Mallares	Summer Pulido	Alliyah Raylee Rodriguez	Thurd Jacob Casumpang	~~Erallyn De Guzman~~
Zack Tabudlo (Project Z)	~~Erienne Kaye Clor~~	Ashley Fe Marie Reviso	Franchezka Shiloh Caguiat	Jaden Lucas	Riahnnah Gaylle Bonostro
Julie Anne San Jose (JulesQuad)					
Julie Anne San Jose (JulesQuad)	Marian Ansay	Erienne Kaye Clor	Erisha Lynn Alayon	Misha Jill Tabarez	Kendra Antonia Gapasin
Julie Anne San Jose (JulesQuad)	M-Jhay Vargas	Princess Marianne Ferwelo	Rezil Dayne Salcedo	Shannea Faith Takiang	Tatiana Odoemene
Ben&Ben (BenKada)					
Ben&Ben (BenKada)	Gianino Sarita	Audriz Hanna Cerineo	Nicollo Gutierrez	Erallyn De Guzman	~~Katniss Aveline Miranda~~
Ben&Ben (BenKada)	Fionalyn Amaquin	Kate Julienne Ligame	King John Matteo Perez	Lily Gelidah Alcover	Sofia Rose Monsanto
Note: Italicized names are stolen artists (names struck through within former teams). Bold names are recipients of coach replay.

== Blind auditions ==
The season will begin with the blind auditions. In each audition, each artist performs their piece in front of the panel of coaches, whose chairs are facing the audience. If a coach is interested in working with the artist, they may opt to press the button to face the artist. An artist is defaulted to a coach when only one coach turns; if multiple coaches turn, the artist chooses their coach. Each coach can use the coach replay once to save an eliminating no-chair turner artist in the entire span of blind auditions. Same as the previous season, each coach needs to recruit 9 artists, totaling 36 advancing to The Battles.

✔	Coach pressed "I WANT YOU" button
	Artist joined this coach's team
	Artist defaulted to this coach's team
	Artist was originally eliminated with no coach pressing their button, but was saved by the "Coach Replay"
	Artist was eliminated as no coach pressed their button

=== Episode 1 (September 14) ===
Before the blind auditions started, the coaches and host performed "Best Day of My Life" by American Authors and season 6 Grand Champion Nevin Adam Garcieniego reprised his winning song "May Bukas Pa".

First blind audition results
Order	Artist	Age	Hometown	Song	Coach's and artist's choices			
Order	Artist	Age	Hometown	Song	Billy	Zack	Julie	Ben&Ben
1	Audriz Hanna Cerineo	13	Pangasinan	"Mamma Knows Best"	✔	✔	—	✔
2	Princess Marianne Ferwelo	10	Parañaque City	"Don't Rain on My Parade"	—	✔	✔	—
3	Charls Yvan Pelojero	8	Mandaluyong City	"Tunay Na Mahal"	—	—	—	—
4	Athena Alexandra Omadto	9	Novaliches, Quezon City	"All by Myself"	✔	✔	—	—
5	Rezil Dayne Salcedo	13	Hermosa, Bataan	"Ngayon At Kailanman"	—	—	✔	✔
6	Sofia Mallares	13	Pasig City	"Ako Naman Muna"	✔	✔	✔	✔

=== Episode 2 (September 21) ===
Among the auditionees were Tatiana Odoemene and Yana Goopio, who both joined The Voice Generations. Odoemene originated from O Duo, while Goopio was part of Alliyana Trio. Both were recruits from JuleSquad, and were eliminated in the Battle Rounds.

Second blind audition results
Order	Artist	Age	Hometown	Song	Coach's and artist's choices			
Order	Artist	Age	Hometown	Song	Billy	Zack	Julie	Ben&Ben
1	Tatiana Odoemene	12	Bataan	"Flowers"	✔	✔	✔	✔
2	Franchezka Shiloh Caguiat	11	Makati City	"Tagu-Taguan"	–	✔	–	✔
3	Flenz Wynzler Quimbo	11	Cebu City	"Go the Distance"	–	–	–	–
4	Yana Goopio	12	Bicol	"A Million Dreams"	✔	–	–	–
5	Shaira Joyce Galicia	11	Nueva Ecija	"Ang Huling El Bimbo"	–	–	–	–
6	Erienne Kaye Clor	11	Calatagan, Batangas	"Hallelujah"	–	✔	–	–
7	King John Matteo Perez	11	Ilagan City, Isabela	"Fight Song"	–	–	–	✔

=== Episode 3 (September 28) ===
Among the auditionees was Gianino Sarita who previously auditioned unsuccessfully in season 5, and Summer Pulido, who also previously appeared on season 5 as part of Team Supreme and was eliminated in the Battle Rounds. She also participated in Tawag ng Tanghalan Kids 2 as a Weekly Finalist.

Third blind audition results
Order	Artist	Age	Hometown	Song	Coach's and artist's choices			
Order	Artist	Age	Hometown	Song	Billy	Zack	Julie	Ben&Ben
1	Gianino Sarita	11	Quezon City	"Mapa"	✔	✔	✔	✔
2	Venisse Rose Balderama	13	Camarines Sur	"Himala"	✔	–	–	–
3	Scarlett Hodzic	10	Pasay City	"Domino"	–	–	–	–
4	Vaughn Hodzic	10	Pasay City	"Dahil Sa'yo"	–	–	–	–
5	Jazmine Hodzic	10	Pasay City	"Speechless"	–	–	–	–
6	Lovers Cabrera	11	Misamis Oriental	"All I Ask"	✔	✔	–	–
7	M-Jhay Vargas	11	Pangasinan	"Ikaw ay Ako"	–	✔	✔	–
8	Summer Pulido	11	San Nicolas, Pangasinan	"She's Gone"	✔	✔	✔	–

=== Episode 4 (October 5) ===
Among the auditionees was Marian Ansay, who is the younger sister of actor Allen Ansay.

Fourth blind audition results
Order	Artist	Age	Hometown	Song	Coach's and artist's choices			
Order	Artist	Age	Hometown	Song	Billy	Zack	Julie	Ben&Ben
1	Alliyah Raylee Rodriguez	12	Batangas	"There’s a Winner in You"	✔	✔	✔	✔
2	Simeon Lawas	11	Carcar, Cebu	"Over the Rainbow"	–	–	–	–
3	Sofia Rose Monsanto	11	Surigao del Norte	"Ang Buhay Ko"	–	–	–	✔
4	Thurd Jacob Casumpang	12	Caloocan City	"Paasa (T.A.N.G.A.)"	✔	–	–	–
5	Amirah Posadas	10	Laguna	"Don't Cry Out Loud"	–	–	–	–
6	Marian Ansay	9	Camarines Sur	"One Moment in Time"	✔	–	✔	✔
7	Lily Gelidah Alcover	13	Misamis Oriental	"Only Hope"	–	✔	–	✔

=== Episode 5 (October 12) ===
Among the auditionees was Kendra Antonia Gapasin, who participated in Tawag ng Tanghalan Kids 2 and finished as one of the Semifinalists.

Fifth blind audition results
Order	Artist	Age	Hometown	Song	Coach's and artist's choices			
Order	Artist	Age	Hometown	Song	Billy	Zack	Julie	Ben&Ben
1	Kendra Antonia Gapasin	10	Pangasinan	"Shine"	✔	✔	✔	✔
2	Ashley Fe Marie Reviso	12	Leyte	"I Will Always Love You"	–	✔	–	–
3	Kate Julienne Ligame	12	Quezon City	"Make You Feel My Love"	✔	✔	–	✔
4	Ava Towns	11	Bulacan	"Maybe This Time"	✔	–	–	–
5	Rein Daniel Salvadora	12	Camarines Sur	"Sayang Na Sayang"	–	–	–	–
6	Erallyn De Guzman	12	Caloocan City	"Tatsulok"	✔	✔	–	✔

=== Episode 6 (October 19) ===
Coach Zack Tabudlo performed his own song "Binibini" before the start of the episode.

Sixth blind audition results
Order	Artist	Age	Hometown	Song	Coach's and artist's choices			
Order	Artist	Age	Hometown	Song	Billy	Zack	Julie	Ben&Ben
1	Ahlia Chantale Encinares	9	Sta. Rosa, Laguna	"And I Am Telling You I'm Not Going"	✔	✔	–	✔
2	Katniss Aveline Miranda	9	Lipa, Batangas	"Let You Break My Heart Again"	–	–	–	✔
3	Erisha Lynn Alayon	8	Bacolod City	"Part of Your World"	–	–	✔	–
4	Angeline Aunzo	12	Taguig City	"Upuan"	✔	–	–	–
5	Shannea Faith Takiang	9	Cagayan de Oro	"What's Up?"	✔	✔	✔	✔
6	Maria Zendrea Flores	12	Sta. Rosa, Laguna	"Tila"	–	–	–	–
7	Jaden Lucas	12	Pangasinan	"What Kind of Fool Am I?"	–	✔	–	–

=== Episode 7 (October 26) ===
Among the auditionees was Misha Jill Tabarez, who previously appeared on season 5 as part of MarTeam and was eliminated in the Battle Rounds. At the end of the Blind Auditions, Julie Anne San Jose and Billy Crawford were not able use their respective Coach Replay buttons.

Seventh blind audition results
Order	Artist	Age	Hometown	Song	Coach's and artist's choices			
Order	Artist	Age	Hometown	Song	Billy	Zack	Julie	Ben&Ben
1	Misha Jill Tabarez	12	Cabuyao City, Laguna	"Feelin' Good"	✔	✔	✔	✔
2	Carl Caringal	13	Nueva Ecija	"Salamat"	—	—	Team full	—
3	Fionalyn Amaquin	12	Las Piñas	"Dito Ka Lang"	—	—	Team full	✔
4	Riahnnah Gaylle Bonostro	13	Surigao del Norte	"Bukas Na Lang Kita Mamahalin"	—	✔	Team full	—
5	Princess Pauline Tuliao	10	Dasmariñas, Cavite	"Never Enough"	—	Team full	Team full	—
6	Ylyza Aquino	12	Dagupan City, Pangasinan	"Tao"	✔	Team full	Team full	✔
7	Nicollo Gutierrez	9	Sta. Ana, Manila	"Natutulog Ba Ang Diyos?"	Team full	Team full	Team full	✔

== The Battles ==
The second stage of the show, The Battles, aired on November 2, with 36 artists advancing to this round. The coaches pit three of their artists in a singing match and then select one of them to advance to the next round. The ability to steal an artist from other teams continued this season. Losing artists may be "stolen" by another coach. Same as the previous season, the steals are done off-stage, where the coaches must go to the artists with their families backstage to steal the artist they want to become the member of their team.

At the end of this round, four artists will remain on each team; three will be the battle winners, and one from a steal. In total, 16 artists advanced to the sing-offs.

Color key

Artist was chosen by his/her coach to advance to the Sing-offs
Artist was stolen by another coach and advanced to the Sing-offs
Artist was eliminated

Battles results
Episode	Coach	Order	Winning Artist	Song	Losing Artists	'Steal' result			
Episode	Coach	Order	Winning Artist	Song	Losing Artists	Billy	Zack	Julie	Ben&Ben
Episode 8 (November 2, 2025)	Julie Anne San Jose	1	Marian Ansay	"Brave"	Kendra Antonia Gapasin	—	—	N/A	—
Episode 8 (November 2, 2025)	Julie Anne San Jose	1	Marian Ansay	"Brave"	Shannea Faith Takiang	—	—	N/A	—
Episode 8 (November 2, 2025)	Zack Tabudlo	2	Summer Pulido	"Always Be My Baby"	Jaden Lucas	—	N/A	—	—
Episode 8 (November 2, 2025)	Zack Tabudlo	2	Summer Pulido	"Always Be My Baby"	Riahnnah Gaylle Bonostro	—	N/A	—	—
Episode 8 (November 2, 2025)	Ben&Ben	3	Nicollo Gutierrez	"Someone Like You"	Kate Julienne Ligame	—	—	—	N/A
Episode 8 (November 2, 2025)	Ben&Ben	3	Nicollo Gutierrez	"Someone Like You"	Fionalyn Amaquin	—	—	—	N/A
Episode 8 (November 2, 2025)	Billy Crawford	4	Yana Goopio	"Liwanag sa Dilim"	Angeline Aunzo	N/A	—	—	—
Episode 8 (November 2, 2025)	Billy Crawford	4	Yana Goopio	"Liwanag sa Dilim"	Thurd Jacob Casumpang	N/A	✔	—	—
Episode 9 (November 9, 2025)	Ben&Ben	1	Audriz Hanna Cerineo	"Don't Stop Me Now"	Sofia Rose Monsanto	—	Team full	—	N/A
Episode 9 (November 9, 2025)	Ben&Ben	1	Audriz Hanna Cerineo	"Don't Stop Me Now"	King John Matteo Perez	—	Team full	—	N/A
Episode 9 (November 9, 2025)	Zack Tabudlo	2	Alliyah Raylee Rodriguez	"I Don't Wanna Miss a Thing"	Ashley Fe Marie Reviso	—	Team full	—	—
Episode 9 (November 9, 2025)	Zack Tabudlo	2	Alliyah Raylee Rodriguez	"I Don't Wanna Miss a Thing"	Erienne Kaye Clor	—	Team full	✔	—
Episode 9 (November 9, 2025)	Julie Anne San Jose	3	Misha Jill Tabarez	"Since U Been Gone"	Princess Marianne Ferwelo	—	Team full	Team full	—
Episode 9 (November 9, 2025)	Julie Anne San Jose	3	Misha Jill Tabarez	"Since U Been Gone"	Rezil Dayne Salcedo	—	Team full	Team full	—
Episode 9 (November 9, 2025)	Billy Crawford	4	Lovers Cabrera	"Die With a Smile"	Ylyza Aquino	N/A	Team full	Team full	—
Episode 9 (November 9, 2025)	Billy Crawford	4	Lovers Cabrera	"Die With a Smile"	Ava Towns	N/A	Team full	Team full	—
Episode 10 (November 16, 2025)	Ben&Ben	1	Gianino Sarita	"Fly Me to the Moon"	Lily Gelidah Alcover	—	Team full	Team full	N/A
Episode 10 (November 16, 2025)	Ben&Ben	1	Gianino Sarita	"Fly Me to the Moon"	Katniss Aveline Miranda	✔	Team full	Team full	N/A
Episode 10 (November 16, 2025)	Zack Tabudlo	2	Sofia Mallares	"Love"	Erallyn De Guzman	Team full	Team full	Team full	✔
Episode 10 (November 16, 2025)	Zack Tabudlo	2	Sofia Mallares	"Love"	Franchezka Shiloh Caguiat	Team full	Team full	Team full	Team full
Episode 10 (November 16, 2025)	Julie Anne San Jose	3	Erisha Lynn Alayon	"Can You Feel the Love Tonight"	Tatiana Odoemene	Team full	Team full	Team full	Team full
Episode 10 (November 16, 2025)	Julie Anne San Jose	3	Erisha Lynn Alayon	"Can You Feel the Love Tonight"	M-Jhay Vargas	Team full	Team full	Team full	Team full
Episode 10 (November 16, 2025)	Billy Crawford	4	Ahlia Chantale Encinares	"I Have Nothing"	Athena Alexandra Omadto	Team full	Team full	Team full	Team full
Episode 10 (November 16, 2025)	Billy Crawford	4	Ahlia Chantale Encinares	"I Have Nothing"	Venisse Rose Balderama	Team full	Team full	Team full	Team full

== The Sing-offs ==
Battle winners and stolen artists advance to the Sing-offs, where each coach selects two to move on to the semi-finals, totaling 8 artists.

Color key

Artist was chosen by his/her coach to advance to the semifinals
Artist was eliminated

Sing-offs results
Episode	Coach	Order	Artist	Song	Result
Episode 11 (November 23, 2025)	Ben&Ben	1	Nicollo Gutierrez	"The Impossible Dream"	Eliminated
Episode 11 (November 23, 2025)	Ben&Ben	2	Gianino Sarita	"Leaves"	Advanced
Episode 11 (November 23, 2025)	Ben&Ben	3	Erallyn De Guzman	"Chasing Pavements"	Eliminated
Episode 11 (November 23, 2025)	Ben&Ben	4	Audriz Hanna Cerineo	"Believer"	Advanced
Episode 11 (November 23, 2025)	Julie Anne San Jose	1	Misha Jill Tabarez	"Better Days"	Eliminated
Episode 11 (November 23, 2025)	Julie Anne San Jose	2	Erisha Lynn Alayon	"The Way You Look at Me"	Eliminated
Episode 11 (November 23, 2025)	Julie Anne San Jose	3	Marian Ansay	"I'll Never Love This Way Again"	Advanced
Episode 11 (November 23, 2025)	Julie Anne San Jose	4	Erienne Kaye Clor	"Girls Just Want to Have Fun"	Advanced
Episode 12 (November 30, 2025)	Billy Crawford	1	Lovers Cabrera	"Angels Like You"	Eliminated
Episode 12 (November 30, 2025)	Billy Crawford	2	Katniss Aveline Miranda	"Stone Cold"	Eliminated
Episode 12 (November 30, 2025)	Billy Crawford	3	Yana Goopio	"Nakapagtataka"	Advanced
Episode 12 (November 30, 2025)	Billy Crawford	4	Ahlia Chantale Encinares	"A Change Is Gonna Come"	Advanced
Episode 12 (November 30, 2025)	Zack Tabudlo	1	Thurd Jacob Casumpang	"Talking to the Moon"	Eliminated
Episode 12 (November 30, 2025)	Zack Tabudlo	2	Alliyah Raylee Rodriguez	"Araw Gabi"	Eliminated
Episode 12 (November 30, 2025)	Zack Tabudlo	3	Summer Pulido	"I See Red"	Advanced
Episode 12 (November 30, 2025)	Zack Tabudlo	4	Sofia Mallares	"I Am Changing"	Advanced

== Semifinals ==
The Semi-finals aired on December 7, 2025. Like in Season 4 and the previous season, the Top 8 artists performed solo, with each coach choosing one artist to advance to the Grand Finals.

Color key:

Artist was chosen by his/her coach to move on to the Finals
Artist was eliminated

Semifinals results
Episode	Coach	Order	Artist	Song	Result
Episode 13 (December 7, 2025)	Zack Tabudlo	1	Sofia Mallares	"Hanggang Ngayon"	Saved by Zack
Episode 13 (December 7, 2025)	Zack Tabudlo	2	Summer Pulido	"My Heart Will Go On"	Eliminated
Episode 13 (December 7, 2025)	Ben&Ben	1	Gianino Sarita	"Orange Colored Sky"	Saved by Ben&Ben
Episode 13 (December 7, 2025)	Ben&Ben	2	Audriz Hanna Cerineo	"The Voice Within"	Eliminated
Episode 13 (December 7, 2025)	Julie Anne San Jose	1	Marian Ansay	"What Was I Made For?"	Saved by Julie
Episode 13 (December 7, 2025)	Julie Anne San Jose	2	Erienne Kaye Clor	"Wherever You Are""	Eliminated
Episode 13 (December 7, 2025)	Billy Crawford	1	Yana Goopio	"Piece by Piece"	Saved by Billy
Episode 13 (December 7, 2025)	Billy Crawford	2	Ahlia Encinares	"Royals"	Eliminated

== Grand Finale ==
The Grand Finale aired on December 14, 2025. For this season, the 4 artists (one per team) competed in two rounds (Duet with Coach and Power Ballad) in the Finals. The winner was determined by public votes. Sofia Mallares of Project Z emerged as the champion.

Color key

Artist was proclaimed as the winner
Artist ended as the finalist

Grand Finale results
Coach	Artist	Episode 14 (December 14, 2025)				Result
Coach	Artist	Order	Duet with Coach	Order	Power Ballad	Result
Ben&Ben	Gianino Sarita	1	"Saranggola"	1	"Spain"	Second Place
Zack Tabudlo	Sofia Mallares	2	"Iris"	2	"The Prayer"	Winner
Julie Anne San Jose	Marian Ansay	3	"Bulong"	3	"One Last Time"	Fourth Place
Billy Crawford	Yana Goopio	4	"Raining in Manila"	4	"When We Were Young"	Third Place

== Results summary ==
Color key

Results color key
Winner	Saved by their coach
Runner-Up	Eliminated
Finalists

Coaches color key
Team Bilib
Project Z
JulesQuad
BenKada

Live show results per week
Artist	Week 1	Week 2
Sofia Mallares	Saved	Winner
Gianino Sarita	Saved	Runner-Up
Yana Goopio	Saved	Third Place
Marian Ansay	Saved	Fourth Place
Summer Pulido	Eliminated	Eliminated (Semifinals)
Audriz Hanna Cerineo	Eliminated	Eliminated (Semifinals)
Erienne Kaye Clor	Eliminated	Eliminated (Semifinals)
Ahlia Chantale Encinares	Eliminated	Eliminated (Semifinals)
