= The Voice Kids (Philippine TV series) season 6 =

Season of a Philippine television reality show

The Voice Kids
- Season 6
- Hosted by: Dingdong Dantes
- Coaches: Billy Crawford; Pablo; Julie Anne San Jose; Stell
- Winner: Nevin Adam Garceniego
- No. of episodes: 14

Release
- Original network: GMA Network
- Original release: September 15 – December 15, 2024

Season chronology
- ← Previous; Season 5 Next → Season 7

The sixth season of The Voice Kids, a reality competition show in the Philippines based on the Dutch TV series of the same title, is broadcast by GMA Network. It is hosted by Dingdong Dantes, with Billy Crawford, Julie Anne San Jose, and Stell of SB19 returning as coaches from The Voice Generations; newcomer Pablo, also from SB19, joined as a new coach. The sixth season premiered on September 15, 2024, on the network's Sunday Grande sa Gabi line up replacing the second season of Running Man Philippines. The season ended on December 15, 2024, with Nevin Adam Garceniego as the winner.

== Background ==
Following the success of The Voice Generations, GMA Network announced a new season of an installment of The Voice of the Philippines for its 2024 line-up. The season was officially confirmed by the network in March 2024; they later announced that producers' auditions for the show's season would run from March to June 2024, for singers aged 7 to 14 years old, at the GMA Network Center in Quezon City.

In July 2024, Dingdong Dantes was announced as a presenter of the show, while Billy Crawford, Julie Anne San Jose, and Stell of SB19 were announced to return as coaches from The Voice Generations. Later that month, Pablo, also from SB19, was also announced as a coach.

This marked the first season of the series not to air on ABS-CBN, as it announced that it would stop producing the franchise in May 2024.

== Teams ==
Winner
Finalist
Eliminated in the Semi-finals

Eliminated in the Sing-offs
Stolen in the Battles
Eliminated in the Battles

| Coaches | Top 36 artists | | | | |
|---|---|---|---|---|---|
| Billy Crawford (Team Bilib) | | | | | |
| Billy Crawford (Team Bilib) | Wincess Jem Yana | Rexylyn Hai Caiji | Del Venize Olimba | Jionx Bautista | ~~Jhon Lawrence Bulandres~~ |
| Billy Crawford (Team Bilib) | Anne Gabrielle Manalo | Asket Aliya Catacutan | Bien Iliah Camyla Ablola | Clet Nicole Fiegalan | Eun-Hae Francisco |
| Pablo (Tropa ni Pablo) | | | | | |
| Pablo (Tropa ni Pablo) | Nevin Adam Garceniego | Christina Holly Crosby | Shamchienel Santos | Ziha Gabio | ~~Mark Anthony Punay~~ |
| Pablo (Tropa ni Pablo) | Hannah May Aladin | Jelo Pandac | Keith Neithan Perez | Samantha Perez | Seren Pearce |
| Julie Anne San Jose (JulesQuad) | | | | | |
| Julie Anne San Jose (JulesQuad) | Mark Anthony Punay | Shawn Hendrix Agustin | Elijah Jane Burdios | Ma. Sophia Tiongson | ~~Wincess Jem Yana~~ |
| Julie Anne San Jose (JulesQuad) | ~~Ziha Gabio~~ | Ava Pristine Glarino | Johnbert Desoy Tirao | Jomarx Ezan Bolito | Ma. Janielle Tolentino |
| Stell (StellBound) | | | | | |
| Stell (StellBound) | Jan Hebron Ecal | Jennica Belaza | Alexander Dale Baena Jr. | Jhon Lawrence Bulandres | Brianna Louise Sison |
| Stell (StellBound) | Jhasmen Edonga | Jireh Tzidkenu Sepnio | Joshua Calusa | Lyka Jane Bayang | Niña Ardiente |
Note: Italicized names are stolen artists (names struck through within former teams).

== Blind auditions ==
The season begins with blind auditions, where artists perform for coaches facing away. Coaches press a button to turn if interested. If only one turns, the artist joins their team; if multiple coaches turn, the artist chooses their coach. Each coach recruits 9 artists, totaling 36 advancing to the Battles.

| ✔ | Coach pressed "I WANT YOU" button |
| | Artist joined this coach's team |
| | Artist defaulted to this coach's team |
| | Artist was eliminated as no coach pressed their button |

=== Episode 1 (September 15) ===
The broadcast began with the coaches performing "Something Big" by Shawn Mendes. Among the auditionees was Jan Hebron Ecal, who participated in Tawag ng Tanghalan Kids 2 as one of the Ultimate Resbakbakan finalists.

First blind audition results
| Order | Artist | Age | Hometown | Song | Coach's and artist's choices | | | |
| Order | Artist | Age | Hometown | Song | Billy | Pablo | Julie | Stell |
|---|---|---|---|---|---|---|---|---|
| 1 | Wincess Jem Yana | 14 | Cavite | "Into the Unknown" | ✔ | ✔ | ✔ | ✔ |
| 2 | Jan Hebron Ecal | 11 | Sorsogon | "Handog" | ✔ | ✔ | - | ✔ |
| 3 | Genesis Satur | 8 | San Jose del Monte, Bulacan | "Dance Monkey" | – | – | – | – |
| 4 | Johnbert Desoy Tirao | 12 | Rizal | "Amakabogera" | ✔ | - | ✔ | - |
| 5 | Mark Anthony Punay | 7 | Cebu | "Kung Sakali" | ✔ | ✔ | ✔ | – |
| 6 | Zoe Dayle Rodriguez | 7 | Rizal | "Part of Your World" | – | – | – | – |

Notes

a. Despite Stell not turning for Punay, the latter attempted to choose him as his coach.

=== Episode 2 (September 22) ===
Among the auditionees was Shawn Hendrix Agustin who previously auditioned unsuccessfully in season 5 and also participated in Tawag ng Tanghalan Kids 2, where he finished as one of the Grand Finalists.

Second blind audition results
| Order | Artist | Age | Hometown | Song | Coach's and artist's choices | | | |
| Order | Artist | Age | Hometown | Song | Billy | Pablo | Julie | Stell |
|---|---|---|---|---|---|---|---|---|
| 1 | Del Venize Olimba | 12 | Bacoor, Cavite | "Respect" | ✔ | ✔ | ✔ | ✔ |
| 2 | Christian Emil Crosby | 9 | Cebu | "Shallow" | – | – | – | – |
| 3 | Christina Holly Crosby | 7 | Cebu | "This Is Me" | – | ✔ | – | – |
| 4 | Jennica Belaza | 12 | Manila | "Winner in You" | - | ✔ | ✔ | ✔ |
| 5 | Ma. Ysabela Macuse | 13 | Bukidnon | "Mapa" | – | – | – | – |
| 6 | Shawn Hendrix Agustin | 11 | San Nicolas, Pangasinan | "Ikaw ang Lahat sa Akin" | ✔ | - | ✔ | - |
| 7 | Alexander Dale Baena Jr. | 12 | Parañaque | "New York, New York" | ✔ | ✔ | ✔ | ✔ |

=== Episode 3 (September 29) ===
Among the auditionees was Jionix Bautista who participated in Tawag ng Tanghalan Kids 2 as one of the Ultimate Resbakbakan finalists.

Third blind audition results
| Order | Artist | Age | Hometown | Song | Coach's and artist's choices | | | |
| Order | Artist | Age | Hometown | Song | Billy | Pablo | Julie | Stell |
|---|---|---|---|---|---|---|---|---|
| 1 | Niña Ardiente | 11 | Lanao del Norte | ,"Banal na Aso, Santong Kabayo" | ✔ | ✔ | ✔ | ✔ |
| 2 | Nevin Adam Garceniego | 11 | Quezon City | "Natutulog Ba ang Diyos?" | - | ✔ | ✔ | - |
| 3 | Ma. Janielle Tolentino | 10 | Malolos, Bulacan | "Try It on My Own" | – | – | ✔ | – |
| 4 | Belle Jeisha Mumar | 11 | Bohol | "Tunay na Mahal" | – | – | – | – |
| 5 | Ava Pristine Glarino | 11 | Dasmariñas, Cavite | "Don't Rain on My Parade" | - | ✔ | ✔ | - |
| 6 | Jionx Bautista | 12 | Lipa, Batangas | "Ngayon" | ✔ | – | – | – |
| 7 | Chaerin De Claro | 10 | Quezon City | "Speechless" | – | – | – | – |
| 8 | Samantha Perez | 11 | Bukidnon | "Anak" | ✔ | ✔ | - | - |

=== Episode 4 (October 6) ===
Among the auditionees was Lyka Jane Bayang who participated in Tawag ng Tanghalan Kids 2 and finished as one of the Semifinalists. In 2025, Alexa Mendoza joined Idol Kids Philippines and emerged as the grand champion.

Fourth blind audition results
| Order | Artist | Age | Hometown | Song | Coach's and artist's choices | | | |
| Order | Artist | Age | Hometown | Song | Billy | Pablo | Julie | Stell |
|---|---|---|---|---|---|---|---|---|
| 1 | Anne Gabrielle Manalo | 12 | Siniloan, Laguna | "Killing Me Softly" | ✔ | ✔ | ✔ | ✔ |
| 2 | Lie Kalvin Fernandez | 11 | Biñan, Laguna | "I Surrender" | – | - | – | – |
| 3 | Lyka Jane Bayang | 12 | General Santos | "Tao" | – | – | – | ✔ |
| 4 | Seren Pearce | 11 | Zamboanga | "Make You Feel My Love" | – | ✔ | – | – |
| 5 | Jhon Lawrence Bulandres | 12 | Guihulgnan, Negros Oriental | "Heart Attack" | ✔ | – | – | – |
| 6 | Alexa Mendoza | 9 | Calamba City, Laguna | "Akin Ka Na Lang" | – | – | – | – |
| 7 | Asket Aliya Catacutan | 12 | Bacolod | "Ang Huling El Bimbo" | ✔ | – | – | – |
| 8 | Elijah Jane Burdios | 12 | Negros Oriental | "When I Need You" | ✔ | ✔ | ✔ | - |

=== Episode 5 (October 13) ===
Among the auditionees was Joshua Calusa who participated in Tawag ng Tanghalan Kids 2 and finished as one of the Semifinalists.

Fifth blind audition results
| Order | Artist | Age | Hometown | Song | Coach's and artist's choices | | | |
| Order | Artist | Age | Hometown | Song | Billy | Pablo | Julie | Stell |
|---|---|---|---|---|---|---|---|---|
| 1 | Ziha Gabio | 11 | Iloilo | "Price Tag" | - | ✔ | ✔ | - |
| 2 | Brianna Louise Sison | 13 | Calumpit, Bulacan | "Rise Up" | ✔ | ✔ | ✔ | ✔ |
| 3 | Angel Aleckza Velasco | 13 | Mandaluyong | "Paasa" | – | – | – | – |
| 4 | Hannah May Aladin | 13 | Pangasinan | "Hanggang May Kailanman" | – | ✔ | – | – |
| 5 | Eun-Hae Francisco | 13 | Caloocan | "Let You Break My Heart Again" | ✔ | – | – | – |
| 6 | Felicity Jewel Macadangdang | 11 | Imus, Cavite | "Listen" | – | – | – | – |
| 7 | Joshua Calusa | 11 | Malabon | "Araw Gabi" | - | ✔ | ✔ | ✔ |

=== Episode 6 (October 20) ===
Among the auditionees were Keith Neithan Perez who participated in Tawag ng Tanghalan Kids 2 and became a Grand Finalist, Clet Nicole Fiegalan who previously auditioned unsuccessfully in season 5 and also participated in Tawag ng Tanghalan Kids 2 and also became a Grand Finalist, and Jireh Tzidkenu Sepnio who previously competed in the third season of The Voice Teens as part of MarTeam, but was eliminated in the Battle Rounds.

Sixth blind audition results
| Order | Artist | Age | Hometown | Song | Coach's and artist's choices | | | |
| Order | Artist | Age | Hometown | Song | Billy | Pablo | Julie | Stell |
|---|---|---|---|---|---|---|---|---|
| 1 | Jireh Tzidkenu Sepnio | 13 | Pangasinan | "All by Myself" | ✔ | ✔ | ✔ | ✔ |
| 2 | Bien Iliah Camyla Ablola | 11 | Pangasinan | "Unstoppable" | ✔ | - | - | ✔ |
| 3 | Brency Bless Suguipit | 12 | Cotabato | "Tatsulok" | – | – | – | – |
| 4 | Keith Neithan Azzhreel Perez | 12 | Batangas | "Bukas Na Lang Kita Mamahalin" | – | ✔ | – | – |
| 5 | Clet Nicole Fiegalan | 11 | Muntinlupa | "Till I Met You" | ✔ | – | – | – |
| 6 | Deniel James Cañoneo | 13 | Zamboanga Sibugay | "Ang Buhay Ko" | – | – | – | – |
| 7 | Jomarx Ezan Bolito | 12 | Quezon City | "Go the Distance" | - | ✔ | ✔ | - |

=== Episode 7 (October 27) ===
Seventh blind audition results
| Order | Artist | Age | Hometown | Song | Coach's and artist's choices | | | |
| Order | Artist | Age | Hometown | Song | Billy | Pablo | Julie | Stell |
|---|---|---|---|---|---|---|---|---|
| 1 | Jhasmen Edonga | 14 | Busuanga, Palawan | "Ako Naman Muna" | ✔ | ✔ | ✔ | ✔ |
| 2 | Shamchienel Santos | 12 | Nueva Ecija | "What Kind of Fool Am I?" | ✔ | ✔ | - | Team full |
| 3 | Tobby Angel Buelo | 13 | Lucena, Quezon | "All I Ask" | — | — | — | Team full |
| 4 | Ma. Sophia Tiongson | 13 | Talavera, Nueva Ecija | "It's All Coming Back to Me Now" | ✔ | - | ✔ | Team full |
| 5 | Rexylyn Hai Caiji | 9 | Caloocan | "Nosi Balasi" | ✔ | — | Team full | Team full |
| 6 | Elizabeth Lorenzo | 11 | Antipolo City | "Hallelujah" | Team full | — | Team full | Team full |
| 7 | Jelo Pandac | 10 | Cebu | "She's Gone" | Team full | ✔ | Team full | Team full |

== The Battles ==
In the Battles, 36 artists compete in groups of three, with each coach choosing one winner per match. Coaches can still steal losing artists, but steals happen off-stage by approaching artists and their families backstage. By the end, each team has four artists—three battle winners and one steal— totaling 16 advancing to the sing-offs.

Color key

| Artist was chosen by his/her coach to advance to the Sing-offs |
| Artist was stolen by another coach and advanced to the Sing-offs |
| Artist was eliminated |

Battles results
| Episode | Coach | Order | Winning Artist | Song | Losing Artists | 'Steal' result | | | |
| Episode | Coach | Order | Winning Artist | Song | Losing Artists | Billy | Pablo | Julie | Stell |
|---|---|---|---|---|---|---|---|---|---|
| Episode 8 (November 3, 2024) | Julie Anne San Jose | 1 | Shawn Hendrix Agustin | "Bridge over Troubled Water" | Wincess Jem Yana | ✔ | — | N/A | — |
| Episode 8 (November 3, 2024) | Julie Anne San Jose | 1 | Shawn Hendrix Agustin | "Bridge over Troubled Water" | Ava Pristine Glarino | Team full | — | N/A | — |
| Episode 8 (November 3, 2024) | Pablo | 2 | Shamchienel Santos | "Always Remember Us This Way" | Keith Neithan Perez | Team full | N/A | — | — |
| Episode 8 (November 3, 2024) | Pablo | 2 | Shamchienel Santos | "Always Remember Us This Way" | Hannah May Aladin | Team full | N/A | — | — |
| Episode 8 (November 3, 2024) | Billy Crawford | 3 | Rexylyn Hai Caiji | "Patuloy Ang Pangarap" | Clet Nicole Fiegalan | Team full | — | — | — |
| Episode 8 (November 3, 2024) | Billy Crawford | 3 | Rexylyn Hai Caiji | "Patuloy Ang Pangarap" | Eun-Hae Francisco | Team full | — | — | — |
| Episode 8 (November 3, 2024) | Stell | 4 | Jan Hebron Ecal | "Isa Pang Araw" | Jireh Tzidkenu Sepnio | Team full | — | — | N/A |
| Episode 8 (November 3, 2024) | Stell | 4 | Jan Hebron Ecal | "Isa Pang Araw" | Brianna Louise Sison | Team full | — | — | N/A |
| Episode 9 (November 10, 2024) | Stell | 1 | Jennica Belaza | "Sayang Na Sayang" | Lyka Jane Bayang | Team full | — | — | N/A |
| Episode 9 (November 10, 2024) | Stell | 1 | Jennica Belaza | "Sayang Na Sayang" | Niña Ardiente | Team full | — | — | N/A |
| Episode 9 (November 10, 2024) | Julie Anne San Jose | 2 | Elijah Jane Burdios | "What's Up?" | Johnbert Desoy Tirao | Team full | — | N/A | — |
| Episode 9 (November 10, 2024) | Julie Anne San Jose | 2 | Elijah Jane Burdios | "What's Up?" | Ma. Janielle Tolentino | Team full | — | N/A | — |
| Episode 9 (November 10, 2024) | Pablo | 3 | Nevin Adam Garceniego | "A Million Dreams" | Mark Anthony Punay | Team full | N/A | ✔ | — |
| Episode 9 (November 10, 2024) | Pablo | 3 | Nevin Adam Garceniego | "A Million Dreams" | Jelo Pandac | Team full | N/A | Team full | — |
| Episode 9 (November 10, 2024) | Billy Crawford | 4 | Del Venize Olimba | "Wind Beneath My Wings" | Asket Aliya Catacutan | Team full | — | Team full | — |
| Episode 9 (November 10, 2024) | Billy Crawford | 4 | Del Venize Olimba | "Wind Beneath My Wings" | Anne Gabrielle Manalo | Team full | — | Team full | — |
| Episode 10 (November 17, 2024) | Pablo | 1 | Christina Holly Crosby | "The Climb" | Samantha Perez | Team full | — | Team full | — |
| Episode 10 (November 17, 2024) | Pablo | 1 | Christina Holly Crosby | "The Climb" | Seren Pearce | Team full | — | Team full | — |
| Episode 10 (November 17, 2024) | Billy Crawford | 2 | Jionx Bautista | "I Believe I Can Fly" | Jhon Lawrence Bulandres | Team full | — | Team full | ✔ |
| Episode 10 (November 17, 2024) | Billy Crawford | 2 | Jionx Bautista | "I Believe I Can Fly" | Bien Iliah Camyla Ablola | Team full | — | Team full | Team full |
| Episode 10 (November 17, 2024) | Stell | 3 | Alexander Dale Baena Jr. | "The Greatest Love of All" | Jhasmen Edonga | Team full | — | Team full | Team full |
| Episode 10 (November 17, 2024) | Stell | 3 | Alexander Dale Baena Jr. | "The Greatest Love of All" | Joshua Calusa | Team full | — | Team full | Team full |
| Episode 10 (November 17, 2024) | Julie Anne San Jose | 4 | Ma. Sophia Tiongson | "Over the Rainbow" | Ziha Gabio | Team full | ✔ | Team full | Team full |
| Episode 10 (November 17, 2024) | Julie Anne San Jose | 4 | Ma. Sophia Tiongson | "Over the Rainbow" | Jomarx Ezan Bolito | Team full | Team full | Team full | Team full |

== The Sing-offs ==
Battle winners and stolen artists advance to the Sing-offs, where each coach selects two to move on to the semi-finals, totaling 8 artists. Coaches are joined by advisors: Dionela (Team Bilib), Arthur Nery (Tropa ni Pablo), Chito Miranda (JulesQuad), and Carl Guevarra of The Juans (StellBound).

Color key

| Artist was chosen by his/her coach to advance to the semifinals |
| Artist was eliminated |

Sing-offs results
| Episode | Coach | Order | Artist | Song | Result |
|---|---|---|---|---|---|
| Episode 11 (November 24, 2024) | Pablo | 1 | Shamchienel Santos | "Million Reasons" | Eliminated |
| Episode 11 (November 24, 2024) | Pablo | 2 | Christina Holly Crosby | "Never Enough" | Advanced |
| Episode 11 (November 24, 2024) | Pablo | 3 | Ziha Gabio | "Tagu-Taguan" | Eliminated |
| Episode 11 (November 24, 2024) | Pablo | 4 | Nevin Adam Garceniego | "Shine" | Advanced |
| Episode 11 (November 24, 2024) | Billy Crawford | 1 | Wincess Jam Yana | "Chandelier" | Advanced |
| Episode 11 (November 24, 2024) | Billy Crawford | 2 | Jionx Bautista | "Ikaw Ay Ako" | Eliminated |
| Episode 11 (November 24, 2024) | Billy Crawford | 3 | Del Venize Olimba | "She Used to Be Mine" | Eliminated |
| Episode 11 (November 24, 2024) | Billy Crawford | 4 | Rexylyn Hai Caiji | "Let It Go" | Advanced |
| Episode 12 (December 1, 2024) | Stell | 1 | Jhon Lawrence Bulandres | "Reflection" | Eliminated |
| Episode 12 (December 1, 2024) | Stell | 2 | Jennica Belaza | "Mamma Knows Best" | Advanced |
| Episode 12 (December 1, 2024) | Stell | 3 | Jan Hebron Ecal | "Maybe This Time" | Advanced |
| Episode 12 (December 1, 2024) | Stell | 4 | Alexander Dale Baena Jr. | "Feeling Good" | Eliminated |
| Episode 12 (December 1, 2024) | Julie Anne San Jose | 1 | Shawn Hendrix Agustin | "Ikaw Lang ang Mamahalin" | Advanced |
| Episode 12 (December 1, 2024) | Julie Anne San Jose | 2 | Elijah Jane Burdios | "Fight Song" | Eliminated |
| Episode 12 (December 1, 2024) | Julie Anne San Jose | 3 | Ma. Sophia Tiongson | "Let Me Be the One" | Eliminated |
| Episode 12 (December 1, 2024) | Julie Anne San Jose | 4 | Mark Anthony Punay | "Iingatan Ka" | Advanced |

Non-competition performances
| Order | Performers | Song |
|---|---|---|
| 11.1 | Pablo & Arthur Nery | "Pagsamo" |
| 11.2 | Billy Crawford & Dionela | "Sining" |
| 12.1 | Stell & Carl Guevarra | "Gupit" |
| 12.2 | Julie Anne San Jose & Chito Miranda | "Your Song (My One and Only You)" |

== Semifinals ==
The Semi-finals aired on December 8, 2024. Like in Season 4, the Top 8 artists performed solo, with each coach choosing one artist to advance to the Grand Finals.

Yana and Punay made history as the first stolen artists in The Voice Kids Philippines to reach the finale. Their advancement follows similar feats by Campo (Season 2, The Voice Kids) and Lacuata (Season 4, The Voice Kids) in The Voice Teens. This also marks the first time in the entire Philippine The Voice franchise that more than one stolen artist advanced to the finale.

Color key:

| Artist was chosen by his/her coach to move on to the Finals |
| Artist was eliminated |

Semifinals results
| Episode | Coach | Order | Artist | Song | Result |
|---|---|---|---|---|---|
| Episode 13 (December 8, 2024) | Julie Anne San Jose | 1 | Shawn Hendrix Agustin | "Light of a Million Mornings" | Eliminated |
| Episode 13 (December 8, 2024) | Julie Anne San Jose | 2 | Mark Anthony Punay | "Salamat" | Saved by Julie |
| Episode 13 (December 8, 2024) | Pablo | 1 | Nevin Adam Garceniego | "Kailangan Kita" | Saved by Pablo |
| Episode 13 (December 8, 2024) | Pablo | 2 | Christina Holly Crosby | "Don't Stop Believin'" | Eliminated |
| Episode 13 (December 8, 2024) | Billy Crawford | 1 | Rexylyn Hai Caiji | "Forever's Not Enough" | Eliminated |
| Episode 13 (December 8, 2024) | Billy Crawford | 2 | Wincess Jem Yana | "One Moment in Time" | Saved by Billy |
| Episode 13 (December 8, 2024) | Stell | 1 | Jan Hebron Ecal | "Mula sa Puso" | Saved by Stell |
| Episode 13 (December 8, 2024) | Stell | 2 | Jennica Belaza | "I Am Changing" | Eliminated |

== Grand Finals ==
The Grand Finals aired on December 15, 2024, with the winner determined by public voting. Nevin Adam Garceniego of Tropa ni Pablo emerged as the champion with his heartfelt performance of May Bukas Pa. He received ₱1,000,000, a new house and lot from Vista Land, and a recording contract with UMG Philippines.

Color key

| Artist ended as a runner-up/third place/fourth place |
| Artist ended as the winner |

Grand Finals results
| Episode | Coach | Order | Artist | Song | Result |
|---|---|---|---|---|---|
| Episode 14 (December 15, 2024) | Billy Crawford | 1 | Wincess Jem Yana | "Defying Gravity" | Fourth Place |
| Episode 14 (December 15, 2024) | Julie Anne San Jose | 2 | Mark Anthony Punay | "Himala" | Third Place |
| Episode 14 (December 15, 2024) | Stell | 3 | Jan Hebron Ecal | "Lipad Ng Pangarap" | Runner-Up |
| Episode 14 (December 15, 2024) | Pablo | 4 | Nevin Adam Garceniego | "May Bukas Pa" | Winner |

== Results summary ==
Results color key
| Winner | Saved by their coach |
| Eliminated |
| Finalist |

Coaches color key
| Team Bilib |
| Tropa ni Pablo |
| JulesQuad |
| StellBound |

Live show results per week
| Artist | Week 1 | Week 2 |
|---|---|---|
| Nevin Adam Garceniego | Saved | Winner |
| Jan Hebron Ecal | Saved | Runner-Up |
| Mark Anthony Punay | Saved | Third Place |
| Wincess Jem Yana | Saved | Fourth Place |
| Christina Holly Crosby | Eliminated | Eliminated (Semifinals) |
| Jennica Belaza | Eliminated | Eliminated (Semifinals) |
| Rexylyn Hai Caiji | Eliminated | Eliminated (Semifinals) |
| Shawn Hendrix Agustin | Eliminated | Eliminated (Semifinals) |
