= The Voice Kids (Philippine TV series) =

Philippine television reality show

- Title card in 2026
- Genre: Reality competition
- Based on: The Voice Kids (2012) by John de Mol Jr.
- Written by: Aol Rivera; Garlic Garcia; Waldo Bautista
- Directed by: Johnny Manahan; Joane Laygo
- Presented by: Luis Manzano; Alex Gonzaga; Yeng Constantino; Robi Domingo; Kim Chiu; Toni Gonzaga; Bianca Gonzalez; Dingdong Dantes
- Judges: Lea Salonga; Bamboo Mañalac; Sarah Geronimo; Sharon Cuneta; KZ Tandingan; Martin Nievera; Stell; Julie Anne San Jose; Billy Crawford; Pablo; Zack Tabudlo; Paolo & Miguel Benjamin Guico; Yeng Constantino; Gloc-9
- Country of origin: Philippines
- Original language: Tagalog
- No. of seasons: 7
- No. of episodes: 155 + 2 specials

Production
- Executive producers: Carlo Katigbak; Cory Vidanes; Laurenti Dyogi; Luis Andrada; John de Mol; Peter Edward Dizon; Rose Casala
- Producers: Tarah Anne Buslon; Jose Paolo Fajardo; Jerome Carlos Vargas; Olivia Zarate
- Production locations: Studio 10, ABS-CBN Broadcasting Center, Quezon City (blind auditions, battles, sing-offs); Newport Performing Arts Theater, Resorts World Manila, Newport City, Pasay (live shows)
- Camera setup: Multiple-camera setup
- Running time: 47–50 minutes
- Production companies: ABS-CBN Studios; Talpa Media; ITV Studios; GMA Entertainment Group

Original release
- Network: ABS-CBN (2014–19); Kapamilya Channel (2023); GMA Network (since 2024)
- Release: May 24, 2014 – present

Related
- The Voice of the Philippines; The Voice Teens; The Voice Generations

The Voice Kids is a Philippine television reality talent competition show broadcast by ABS-CBN, Kapamilya Channel and GMA Network. Based on the Dutch television series The Voice Kids, it is a spin-off of The Voice of the Philippines. Originally directed by Johnny Manahan, it was originally hosted by Luis Manzano and Alex Gonzaga. It premiered on May 24, 2014, on ABS-CBN's Yes Weekend line up. Dingdong Dantes served as the host for its most recent season.

== Overview ==
The Voice Kids is a reality television series that started from the Dutch television series with the same title, which was a spin-off of the Dutch series The Voice of Holland. The series features three coaches searching for a batch of talented new kids, who could become the Philippines' new child singing superstar. The coaches will judge a contestant termed by the show as "artist" with only their vocal talent without prejudice to their physical appearance.

The show consists of five stages – producers' auditions, blind auditions, battles, sing-offs and live shows.

- Producers' auditions – not shown on television. Different judges on auditions where the team will travel in and out of the country to find the "best of the best" to participate in the next set of auditions.
- Blind auditions – first televised stage where auditionees will be given a minimum of ninety seconds to sing. The coaches of the show will be sitting on a chair facing away from the auditionees. If a coach like what they hear and want to mentor the artist for the next stage, they will push a button on their chair that would turn the chair around to face the auditionees. When a coach turns for an artist, that artist will be included in their team. When more than one coach turns around, the choice to pick a who will be the mentor goes to the auditionees. If no coach turns their chair the auditionees' journey ends. The coaches have a certain number of artists in their team. who will be advancing to the next round.
- The Battles – coaches will build up their team for "The Sing-offs", and group their artists into groups of three. Per group, they will be given a single song to sing together. A singing showdown commences in the Battle stage where the contestant whom the coach deemed performed better will advance to the next round. Steals were added in the fourth season, where coaches can steal one losing contestant from a different team.
- The Sing-offs – each coach will pick a certain number of artists (two in the first two seasons and three in the next three seasons) in order to advance to the semi-finals.
- Live shows – the semi-final round and the final round. Results are based from the public votes.

== Development ==
On November 18, 2013, Laurenti Dyogi, ABS-CBN's business unit head, announced that there would be a kids version of The Voice of the Philippines. It was launched after the success of The Voice of the Philippines season 1.

=== Auditions ===
Auditions were announced in November 2013. The first open call auditions were held on November 23, 2013, at Metro Gaisano Pacific Mall in Mandaue, Cebu and was open to kids aged 8 to 14 years old. It was followed by an audition held on December 1, 2013, at the Newport Mall in Resorts World Manila. In 2014, auditions for the Visayas, Mindanao, and Metro Manila were held on January 11, 18 and 25 respectively. A separate audition for Luzon was held on February 1. The "blind auditions" for the first season were filmed until March 20, 2014, at Studio 10 of ABS-CBN Broadcasting Center in Quezon City, Metro Manila.

The auditions for the second season was held on March 7, 2015, at the Araneta Coliseum in Quezon City. Other auditions were held at several cities. The age of the auditionees were reduced to aged 7 to 13 from the first season's aged 8 to 14.

For its sixth season, the first season of the show broadcast by GMA Network – the auditions were scheduled from March to June 2024.

== Hosts ==
Hosts

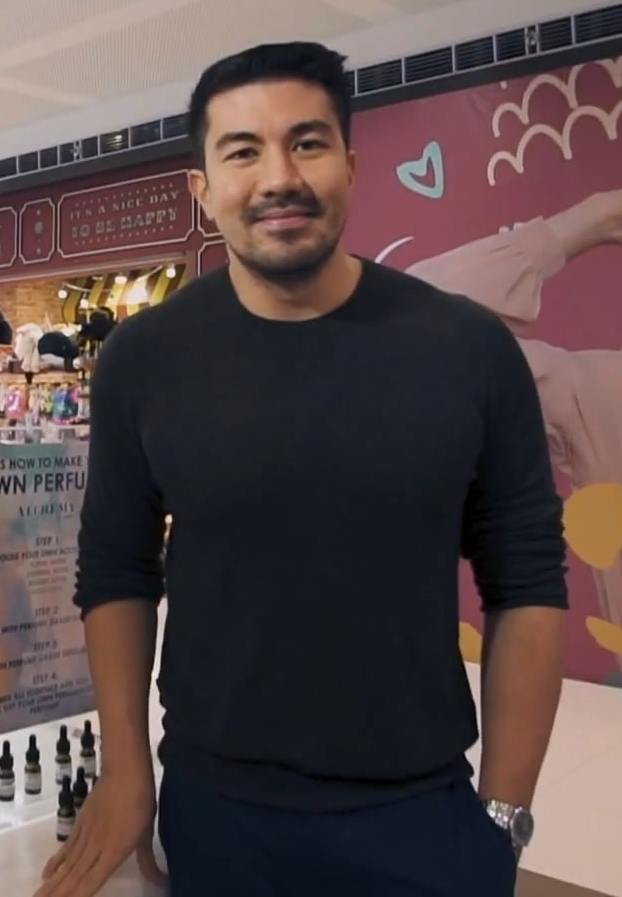
Luis Manzano

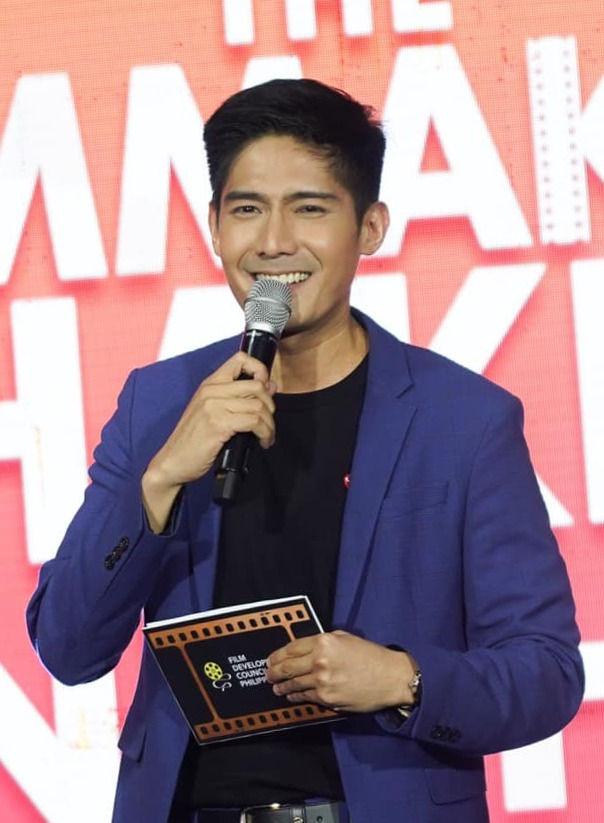
Robi Domingo

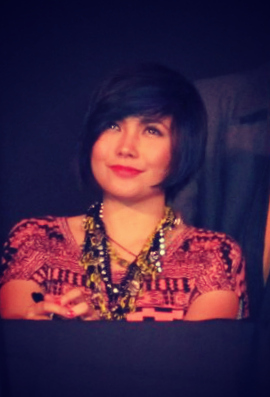
Yeng Constantino

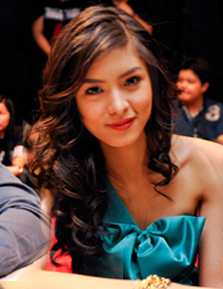
Kim Chiu

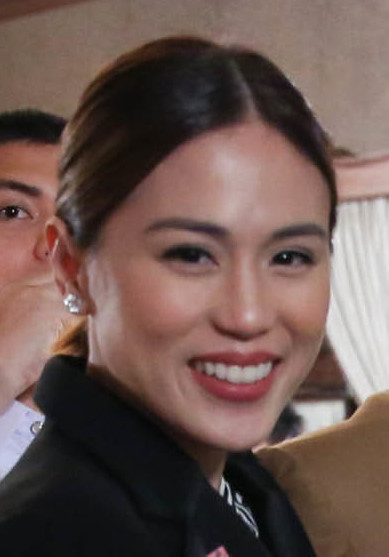
Toni Gonzaga

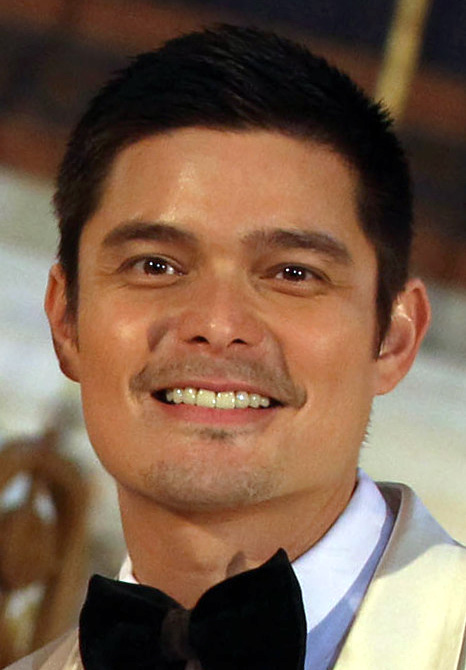
Dingdong Dantes

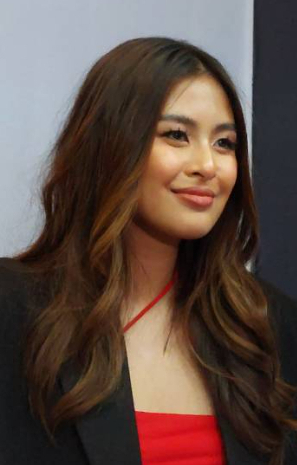
Gabbi Garcia

The Voice Kids hosts
Host	Seasons							
Host	1	2	3	4	5	6	7	8
Luis Manzano								
Alex Gonzaga								
Robi Domingo								
Yeng Constantino								
Kim Chiu								
Toni Gonzaga								
Bianca Gonzalez								
Dingdong Dantes								
Gabbi Garcia								

Legend
Featured as a host.
Featured as a backstage host.

On March 17, 2014, Luis Manzano and Alex Gonzaga were announced as the hosts. The second season was hosted by Manzano, along with Robi Domingo and Yeng Constantino. Domingo and Constantino replaced Gonzaga as the backstage and social media host. In the third season, Kim Chiu replaced Constantino. For the fourth season, Toni Gonzaga replaced Manzano. Domingo returned as a backstage host. During the fifth season, Domingo returned as a host, with Bianca Gonzalez replacing Toni Gonzaga as a host. On July 17, 2024, Dingdong Dantes was announced as the host. On July 31, 2026, Gabbi Garcia was announced as the backstage host.

== Coaches ==
Coaches

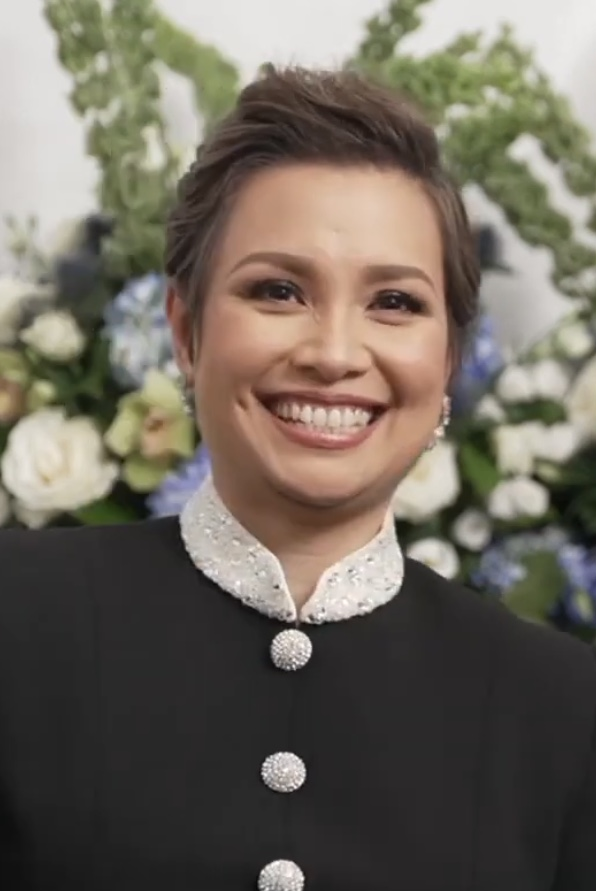
Lea Salonga

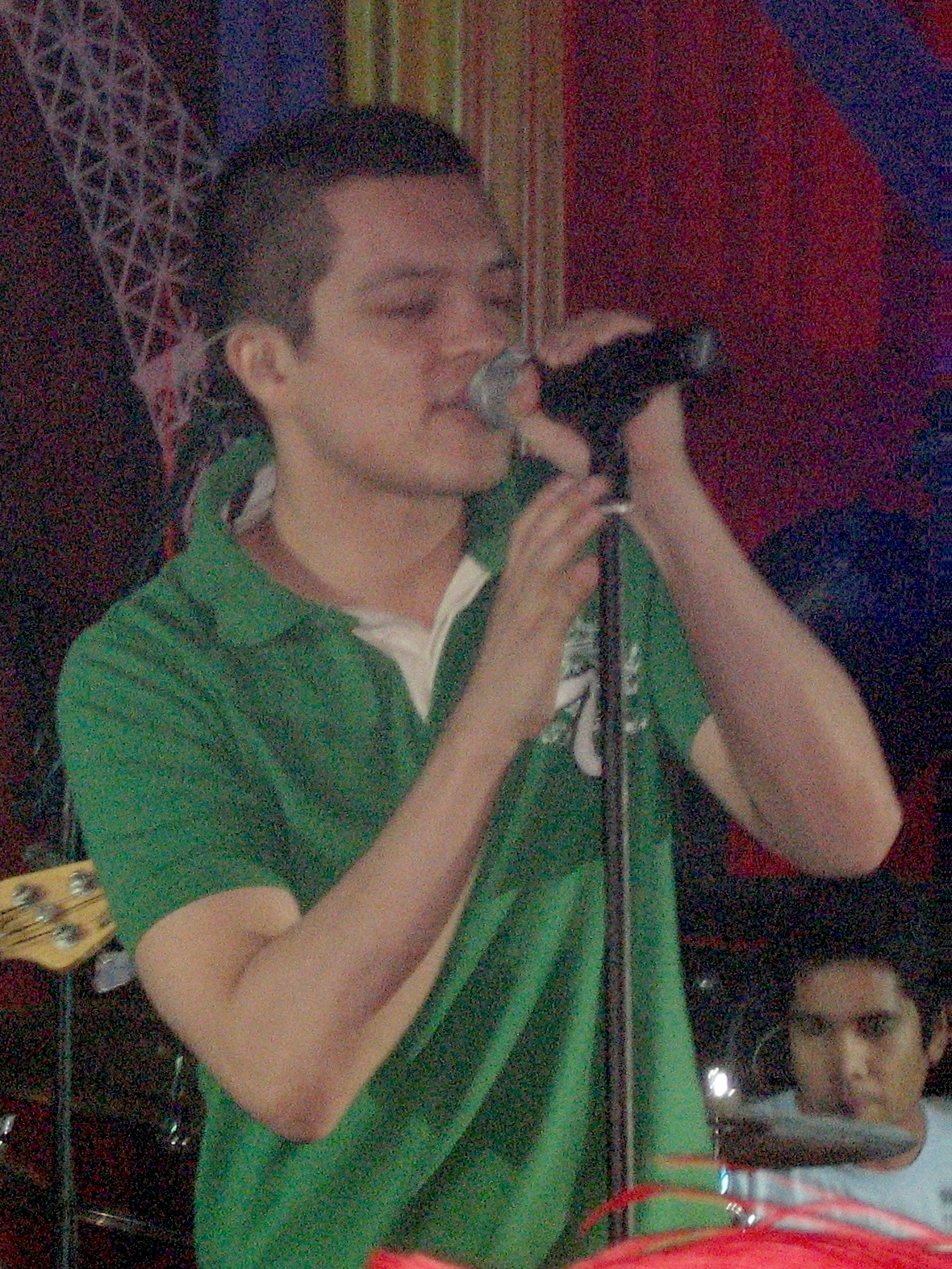
Bamboo Mañalac

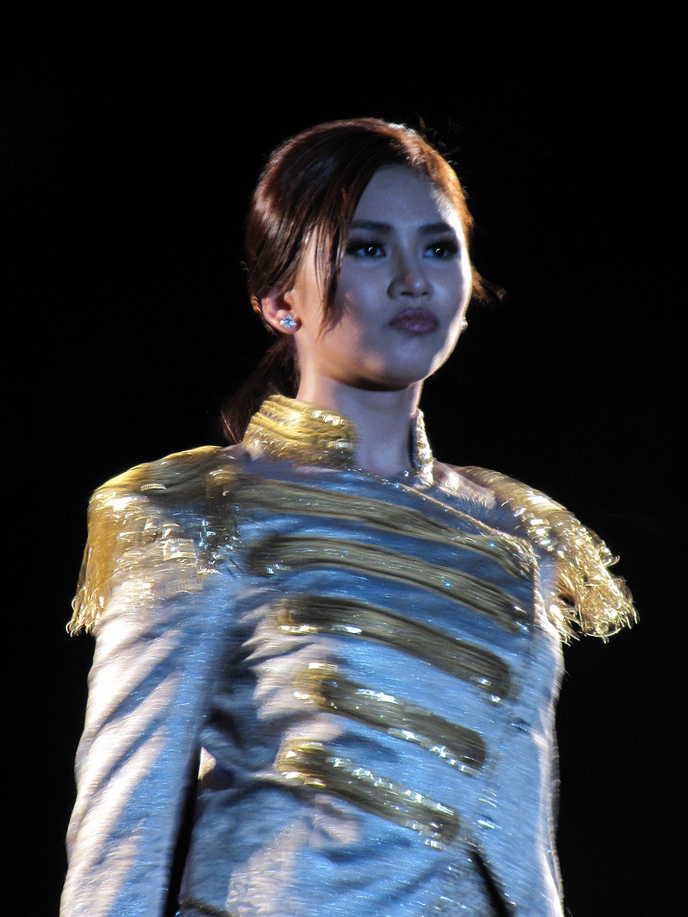
Sarah Geronimo

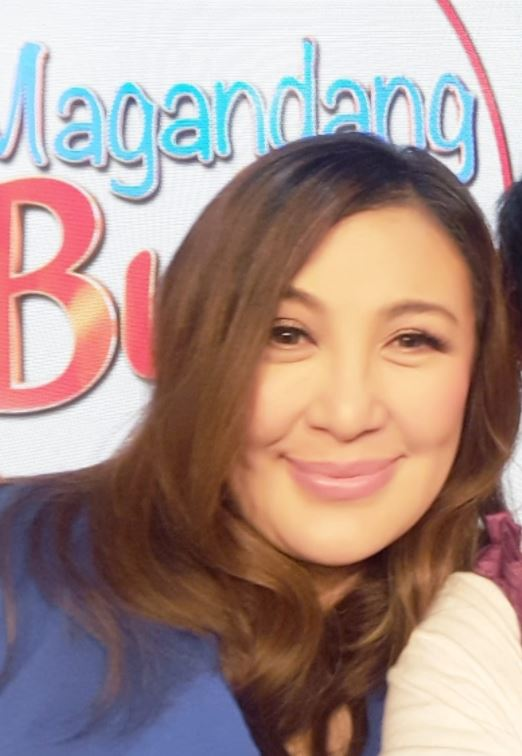
Sharon Cuneta

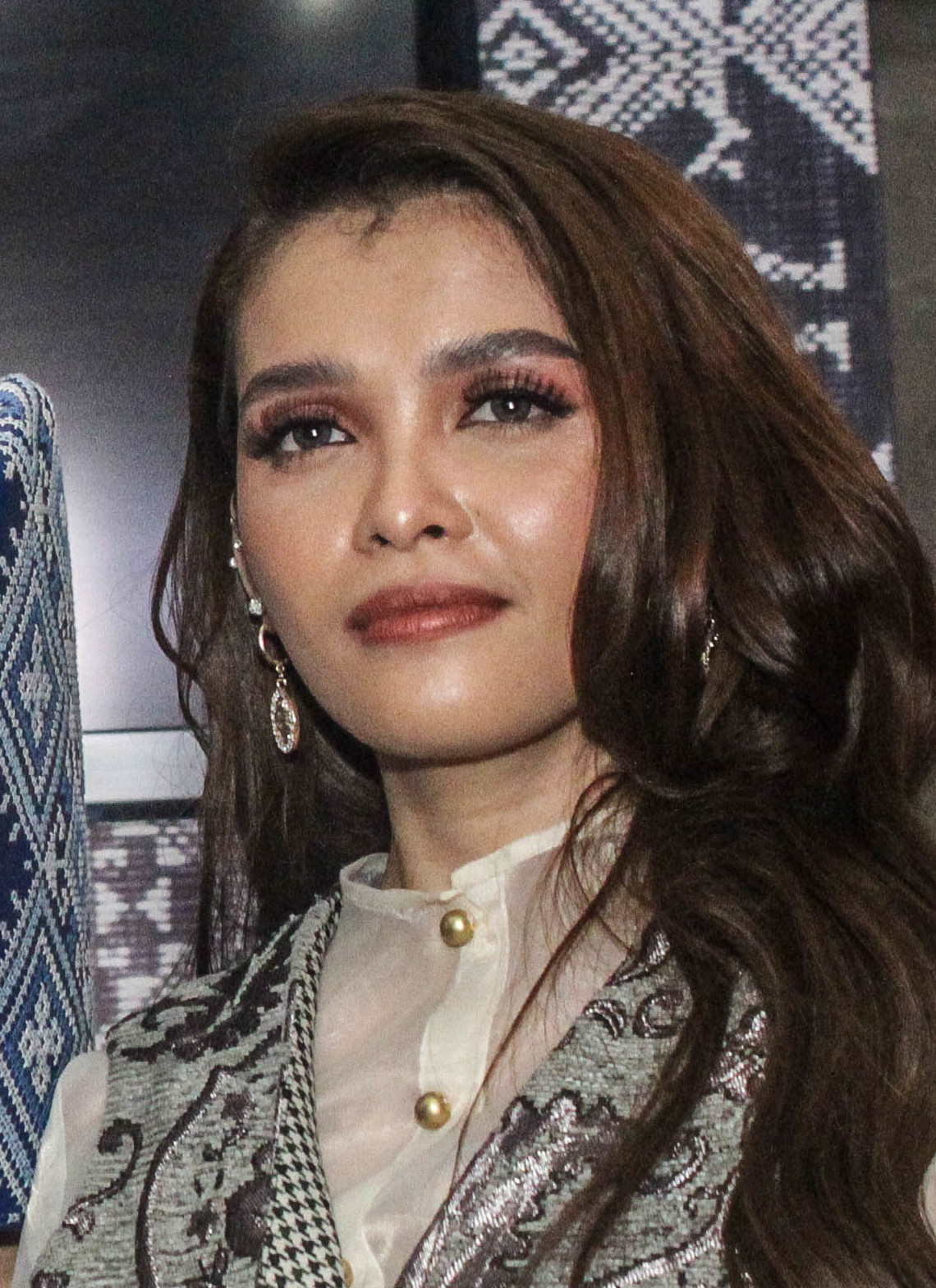
KZ Tandingan

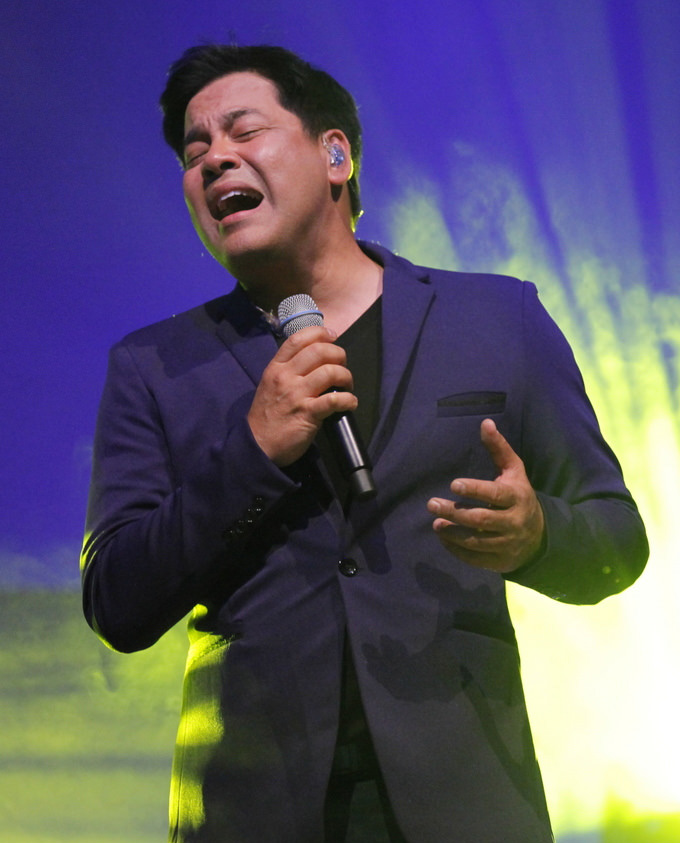
Martin Nievera

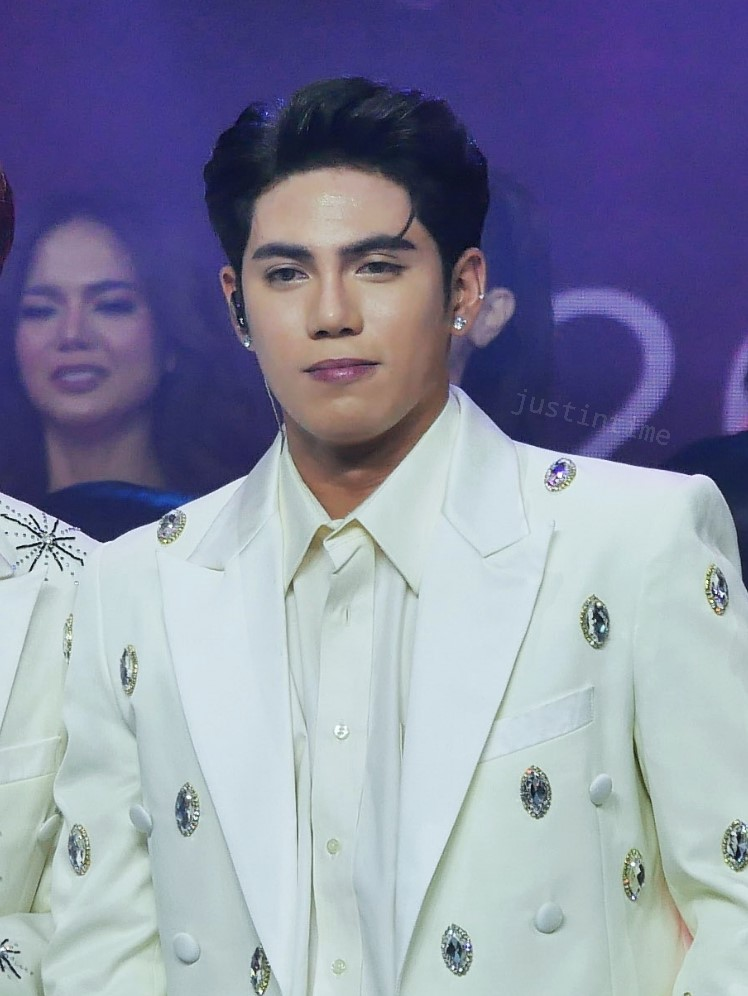
Stell

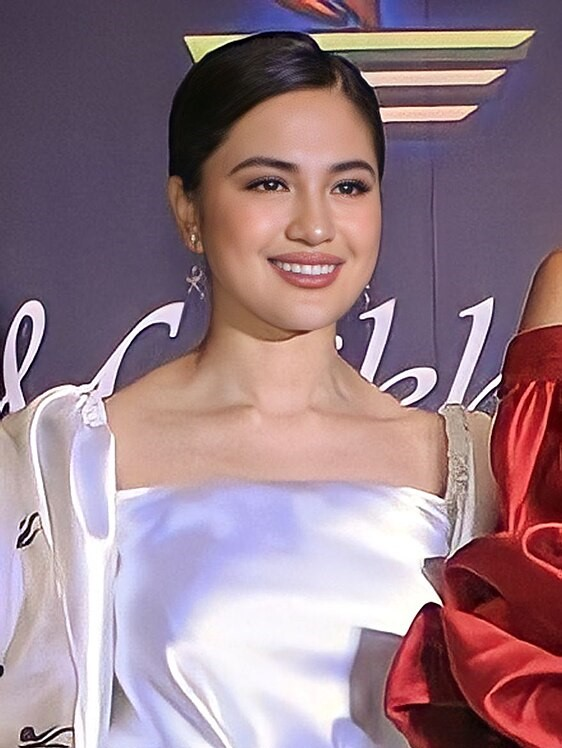
Julie Anne San Jose

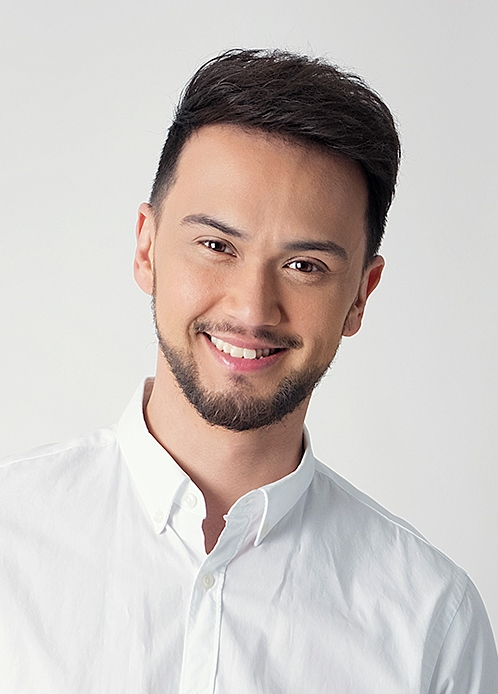
Billy Crawford

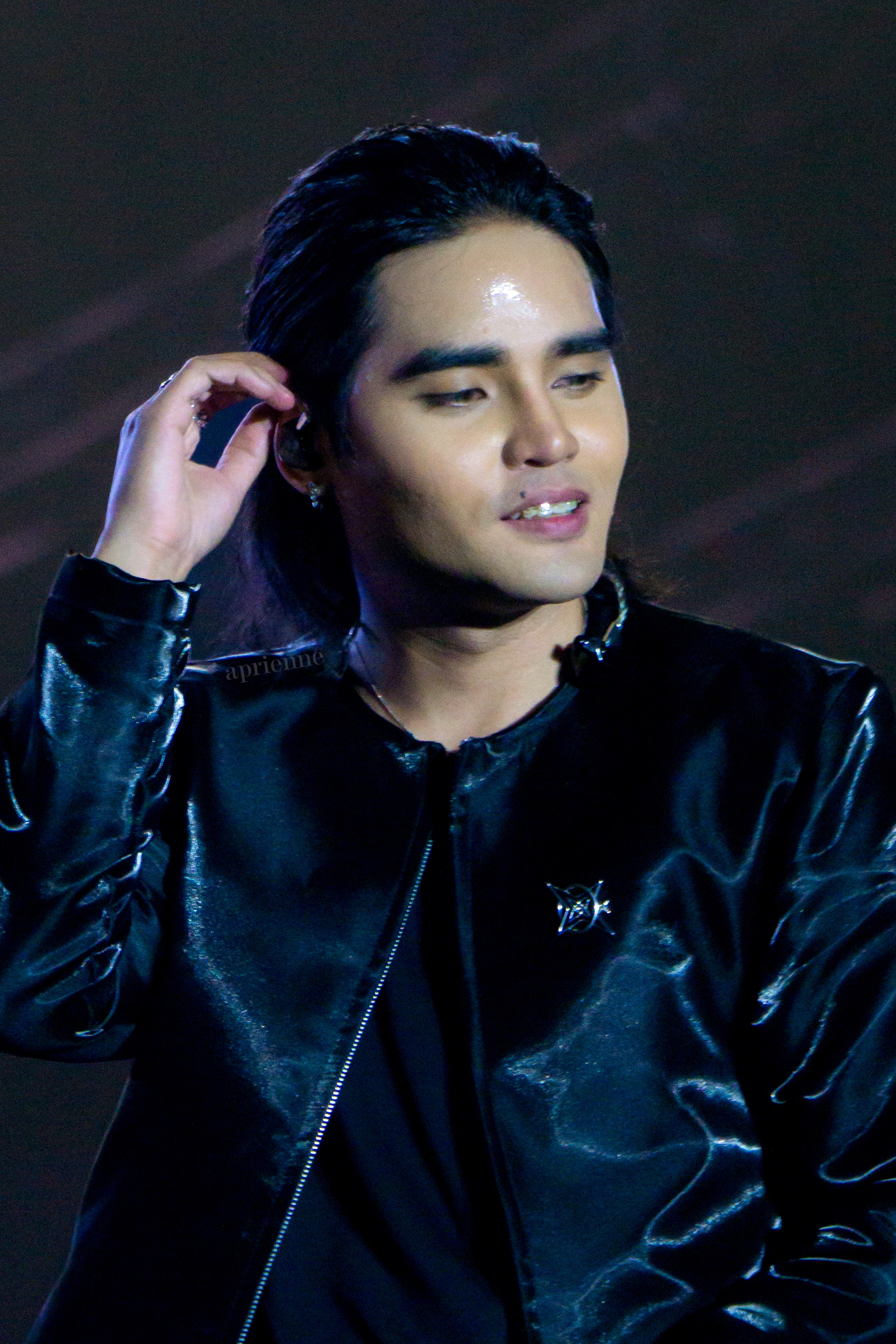
Pablo

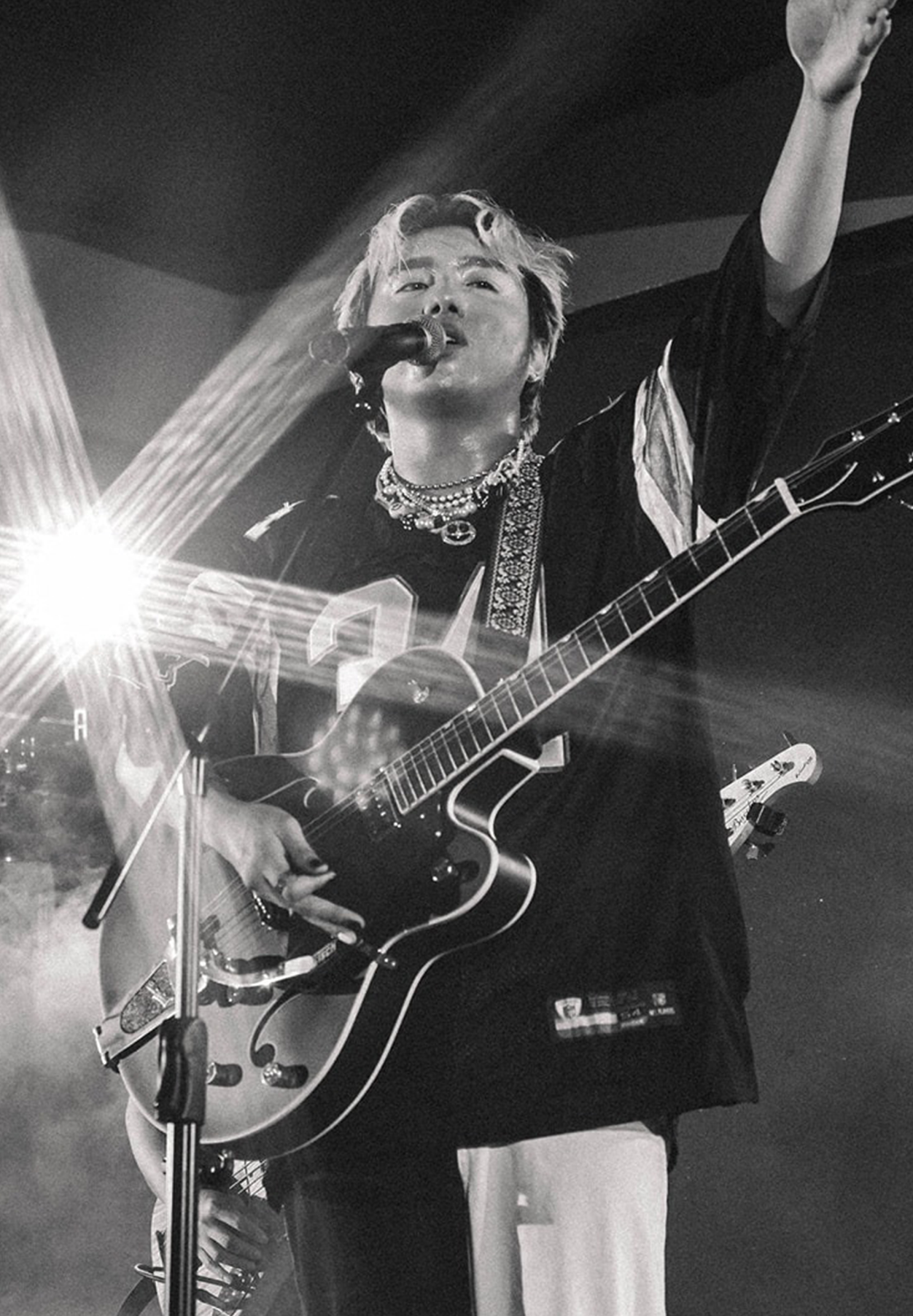
Zack Tabudlo

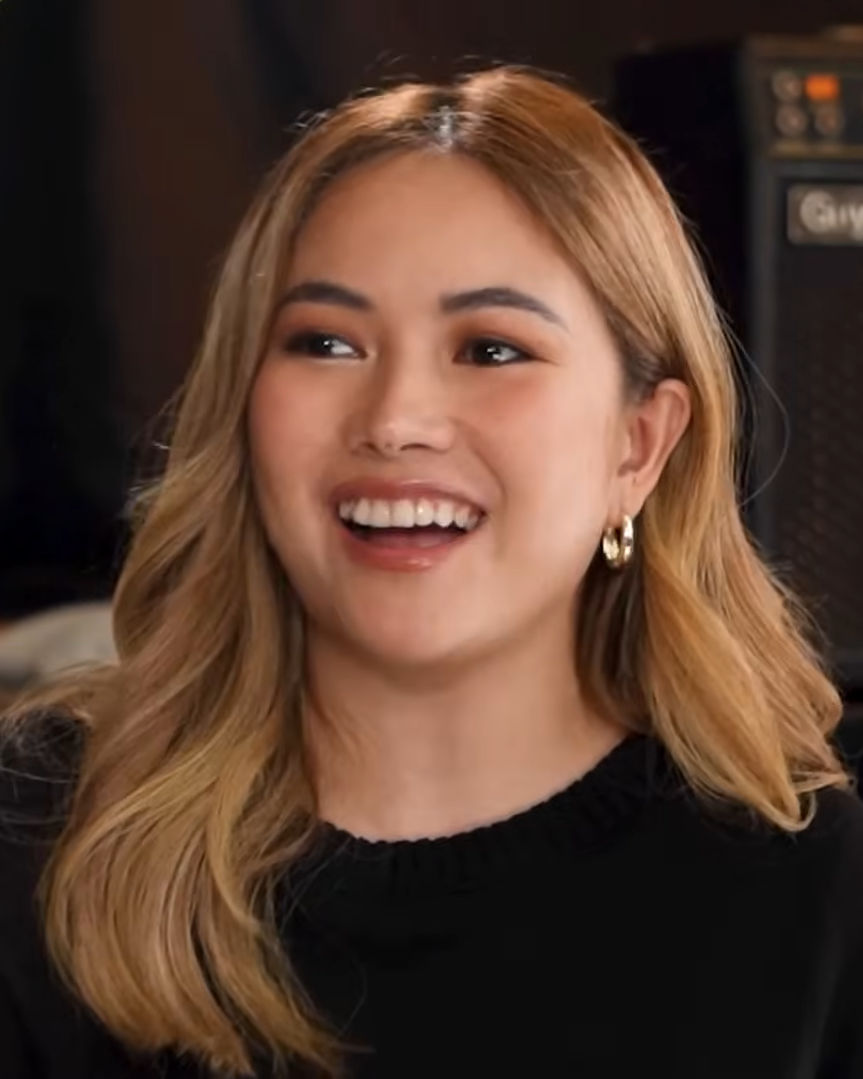
Yeng Constantino

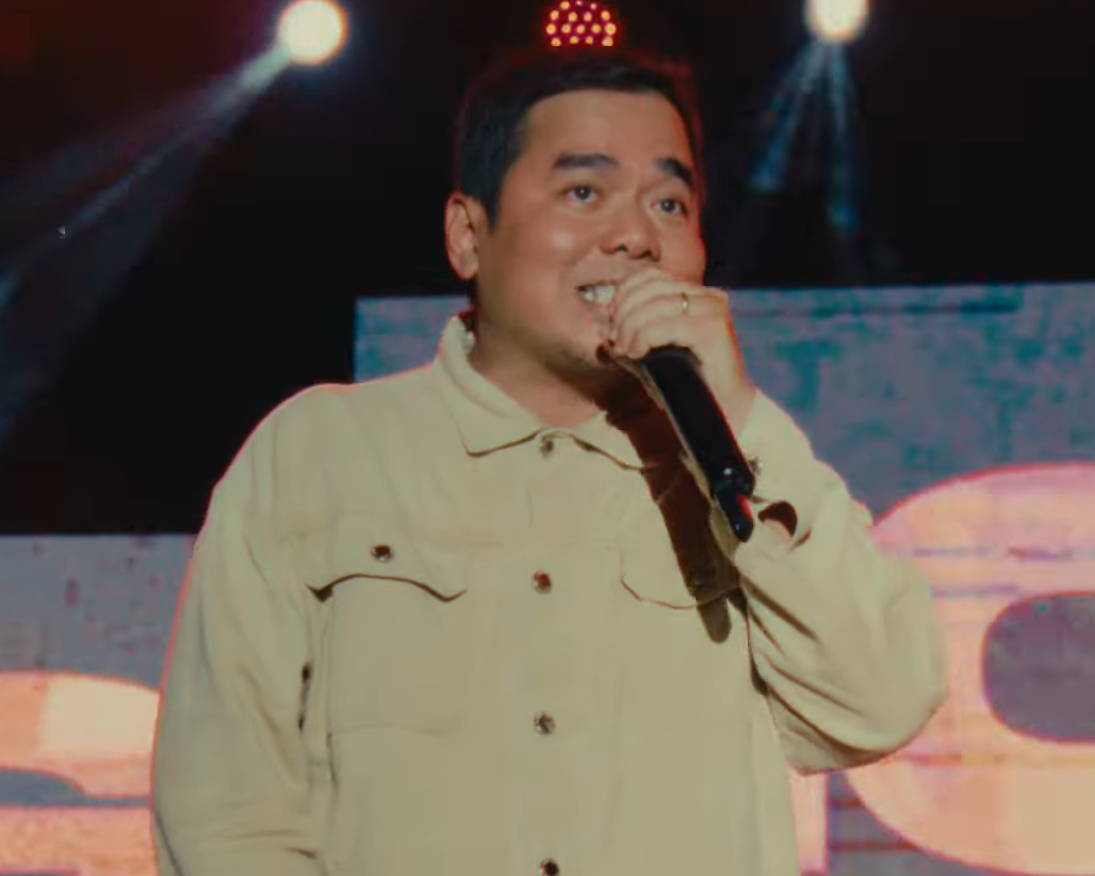
Gloc-9

The Voice Kids coaches
Coach	Team name	Seasons							
Coach	Team name	1	2	3	4	5	6	7	8
Bamboo Mañalac	Kamp Kawayan								
Lea Salonga	FamiLea								
Sarah Geronimo	Team Sarah								
Sharon Cuneta	Team Sharon								
KZ Tandingan	Team Supreme								
Martin Nievera	MarTeam								
Stell	StellBound								
Julie Anne San Jose	JuleSquad								
Billy Crawford	Team Bilib								
Pablo	Tropa ni Pablo								
Zack Tabudlo	Project Z								
Paolo and Miguel Benjamin Guico	BenKada								
Yeng Constantino	Yengcredibles								
Gloc-9	Team Makata								

Lea Salonga, Sarah Geronimo and Bamboo Mañalac all served as coaches for the first two seasons of the show. Salonga and Mañalac both returned as coaches for the third season. On April 4, 2016, Geronimo left the show. On May 2, 2016, singer-actress Sharon Cuneta joined as a coach for the third season. After the third season, Cuneta did not return as a coach due to her stress on the show. For the fourth season, Geronimo returned as a coach, along with Salonga and Mañalac. For the fifth season, singers KZ Tandingan and Martin Nievera were both announced to replace Geronimo and Salonga. Mañalac also returned as a coach. In April 2024, SB19 member Stell joined the show as a coach. In July 2024, singer-actress Julie Anne San Jose, singer-actor Billy Crawford and SB19 member Pablo joined the show as coaches, alongside Stell. On July 31, 2025, Zack Tabudlo and Ben&Ben's Paolo and Miguel Benjamin Guico were announced as new coaches. In July 2026, Yeng Constantino and Gloc-9 joined as new coaches, alongside San Jose.

== Seasons ==
Season	Episodes	Originally released		
Season	Episodes	First released	Last released	Network
1	20	May 24, 2014	July 27, 2014	ABS-CBN
2	26	June 6, 2015	August 30, 2015	ABS-CBN
3	28	May 28, 2016	August 28, 2016	ABS-CBN
4	28	August 3, 2019	November 3, 2019	ABS-CBN
5	25	February 25, 2023	May 21, 2023	Kapamilya Channel
6	14	September 15, 2024	December 15, 2024	GMA Network
7	14	September 14, 2025	December 14, 2025	GMA Network
8	7	September 13, 2026	TBA	GMA Network

== Ratings ==
According to AGB Nielsen Philippines' Mega Manila household television ratings, the pilot episode of The Voice Kids earned a 25% rating. The season one's finale scored a 29.2% rating. The season two's premiere achieved a 20.7% rating. The season two's finale garnered a 27.2% rating. The season three's premiere earned an 18.8% rating. The season three's finale achieved a 25.5% rating.

According to AGB Nielsen Philippines' Nationwide Urban Television Audience Measurement People in Television Homes, the season five premiere earned a 6.7% rating. The season six's premiere scored a 12.7% rating. The season six finale achieved a 13.6% rating. The season eight's premiere earned an 8.2% rating.

== Accolades ==
Accolades received by The Voice Kids
Year	Award	Category	Recipient	Result	Ref.
2014	ASAP Pop Viewers' Choice Awards	Pop Kapamilya TV Show	The Voice Kids	Won	
2014	28th PMPC Star Awards for Television	Best Talent Search Program Host	Luis Manzano, Alex Gonzaga	Won	
2015	46th Box Office Entertainment Awards	Top Reality Talent Search	The Voice Kids	Won	
2015	29th PMPC Star Awards for Television	Best Talent Search Program Host	Luis Manzano, Robi Domingo, Yeng Constantino	Nominated	
2015	11th USTV Students' Choice Awards	Students’ Choice of Reality Game Show	The Voice Kids	Won	
2015	11th USTV Students' Choice Awards	Students' Choice of Reality Game Show Host	Toni Gonzaga	Won	
2015	6th Golden Screen Awards	Outstanding Adapted Reality/Competition Program	The Voice Kids	Nominated	
2015	6th Golden Screen Awards	Outstanding Adapted Reality/Competition Program Host	Luis Manzano	Won	
2016	2nd Mabini Media Awards	Best Game/Reality Program	The Voice Kids	Won	
2016	30th PMPC Star Awards for Television	Best Talent Search Program Host	Luis Manzano, Robi Domingo, Kim Chiu	Won	
2017	22nd Asian Television Awards	Best Adaptation of an Existing Format	The Voice Kids	Nominated	
2017	48th Box Office Entertainment Awards	Most Popular TV Program–Talent	The Voice Kids	Won	
2025	38th PMPC Star Awards for Television	Best Talent Search Program Host	Dingdong Dantes	Pending	
