= The Voice Kids (Philippine TV series) season 5 =

The Voice Kids
- Season 5
- Hosted by: Robi Domingo; Bianca Gonzalez
- Coaches: Bamboo Mañalac; KZ Tandingan; Martin Nievera
- No. of contestants: 54 artists
- Winner: Shane Bernabe
- Runners-up: Rai Fernandez (1st runner-up); Xai Martinez (2nd runner-up)
- Companion show: The Voice Kids DigiTV (Digital)
- No. of episodes: 25

Release
- Original network: Kapamilya Channel (Note: The show also airs on A2Z and TV5.)
- Original release: February 25 – May 21, 2023

Season chronology
- ← Previous; Season 4 Next → Season 6

The fifth season of The Voice Kids aired on Kapamilya Channel, A2Z, and TV5 from February 25 to May 21, 2023. Bamboo Mañalac reprised his role as a coach, being joined by debuting coaches KZ Tandingan and Martin Nievera.

This is the first season among the Philippine seasons to feature only one female coach, as well as the first to feature two new coaches. The fifth season is also the first among the kids' seasons to feature the block button, where a coach can prevent another coach from getting picked by a contestant.

Shane Bernabe of Kamp Kawayan was named the winner of the competition on the season finale aired on May 21, 2023. Her victory marks Mañalac's second win as a coach.

This is the final season of the Kids' franchise in the network after GMA Network acquired the rights of the program in 2024.

== Development ==
The renewal of The Voice Kids was announced on November 14, 2022; the schedule for the auditions were also announced. It was announced that this season will also air on TV5 during the 2023 trade launch of the said network on November 23, 2022.

=== Producers' auditions ===
The auditions were opened to children aged 6–12. The producers' auditions were held in cities and municipalities throughout the Philippines.

On-ground auditions for The Voice Kids season 5
Date	Venue	City	Ref(s)
November 20, 2022	Starmall SJDM Bulacan	San Jose Del Monte, Bulacan	
November 26, 2022	Starmall EDSA Shaw	Mandaluyong	
December 3, 2022	Vista Mall Dasmariñas	Dasmariñas, Cavite	
December 4, 2022	Vista Mall Bataan	Balanga, Bataan	
December 10, 2022	Vista Mall Tanza	Tanza, Cavite	
December 11, 2022	Vista Mall Taguig	Taguig	

== Changes ==
=== Coaches and hosts ===
The coaches of the fifth season of The Voice Kids

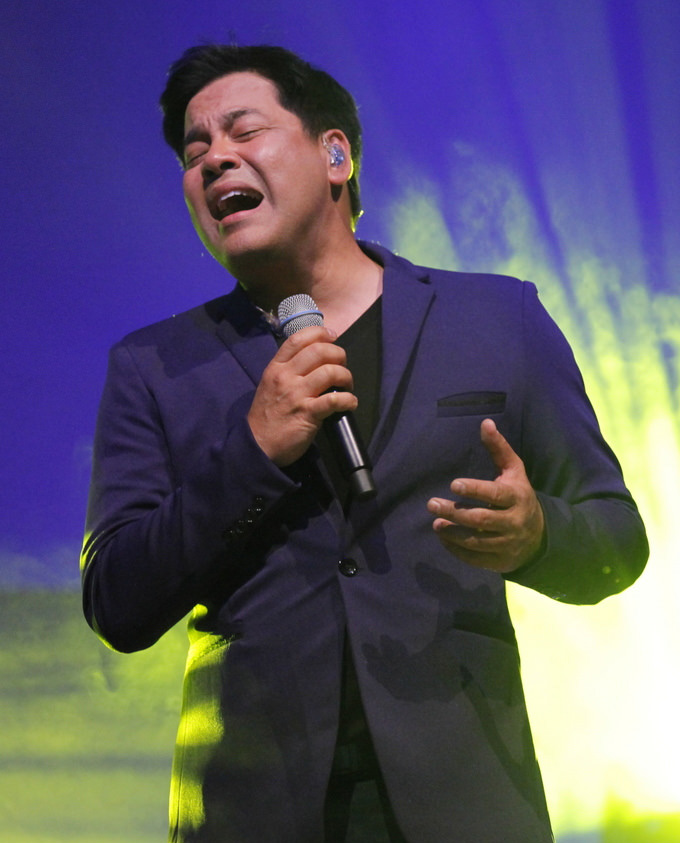
Martin Nievera

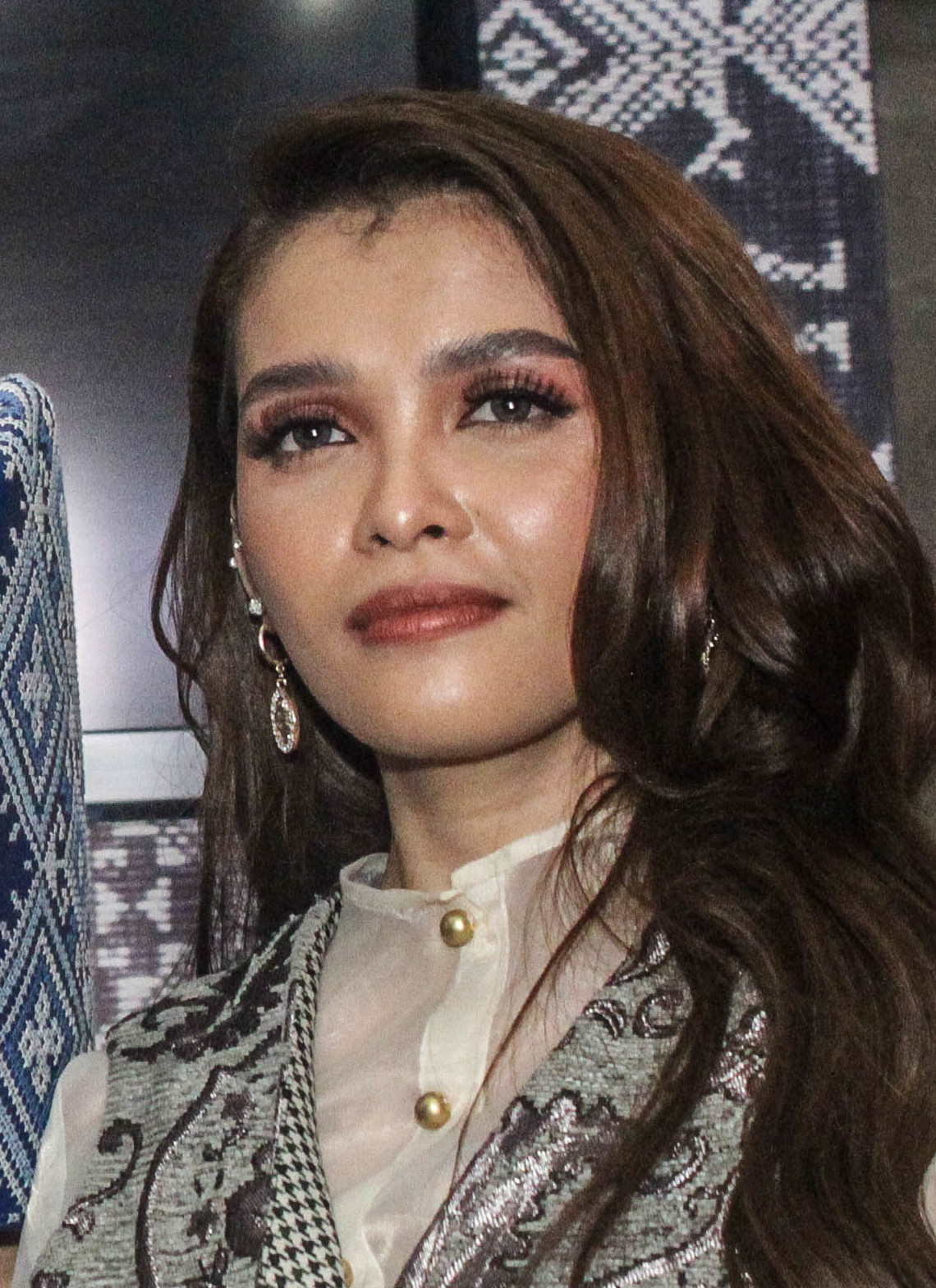
KZ Tandingan

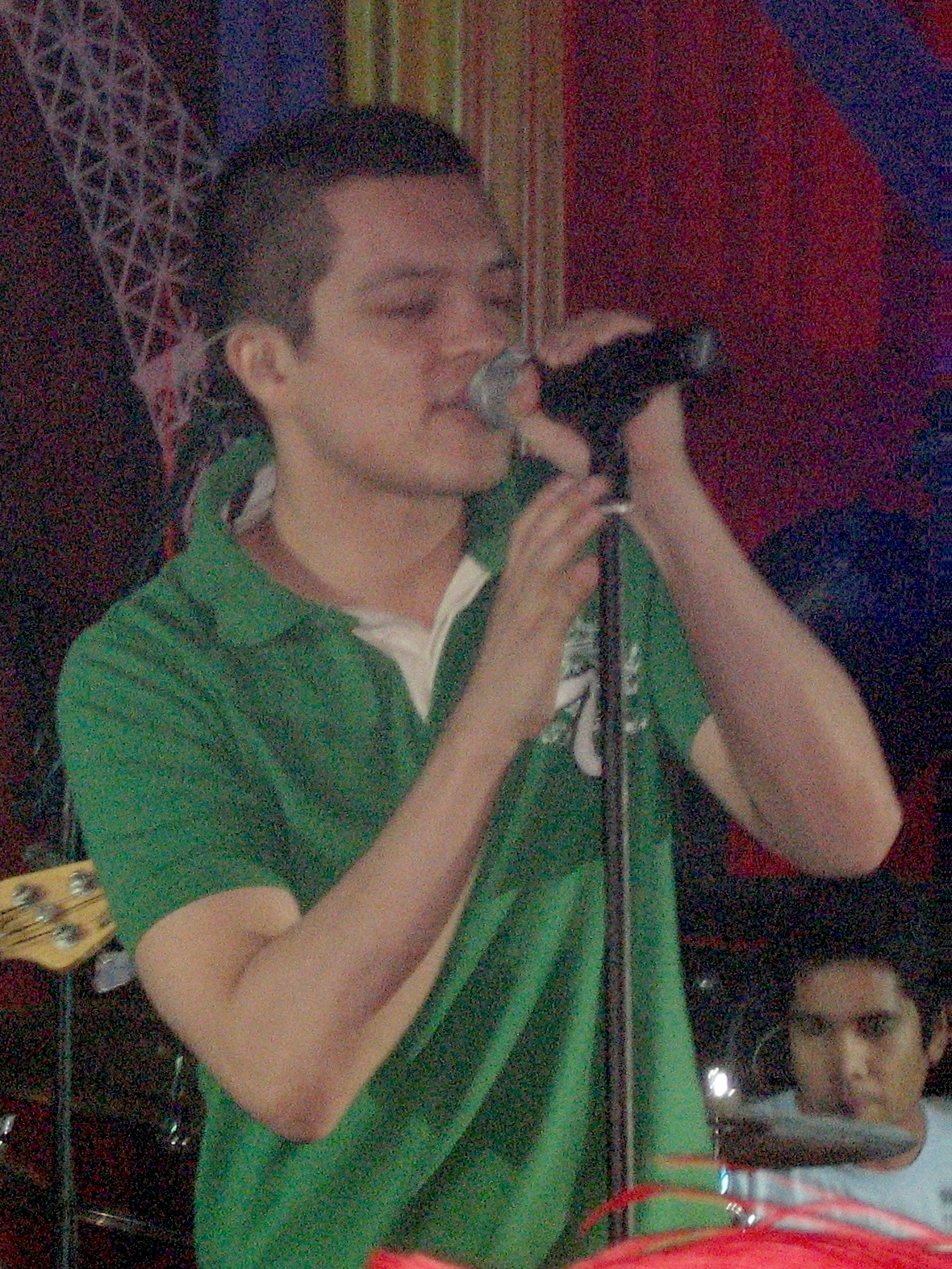
Bamboo Mañalac

On December 18, 2022, the roster of coaches for the fifth season was announced on the Tayo ang Ligaya ng Isa't-Isa: The ABS-CBN Christmas Special 2022. Of the three coaches that appeared in the previous season, only Bamboo Mañalac returned, marking the exit of Lea Salonga and Sarah Geronimo from the judging panel. The two departing coaches were replaced by singer and rapper KZ Tandingan and singer and television host Martin Nievera.

Following the exit of Toni Gonzaga from the network, it was announced in the press that Bianca Gonzalez will take over her hosting duties, joined by Robi Domingo who has been a co-host of the show since its second season. Jolina Magdangal served as the guest host for the Final Showdown in the absence of Bianca Gonzalez for health reasons.

=== Companion show ===
The online companion show, titled The Voice Kids DigiTV airs together with the main program on the official Facebook and YouTube accounts of The Voice Kids and ABS-CBN's Kapamilya Online Live. Jeremy Glinoga returned as the host, together with season 2 winner Elha Nympha, who replaced KaladKaren.

=== Block button ===
As shown in the teasers, new to this season is the Block. Each coach may press the corresponding button to prevent one coach from getting an artist. This mechanic was first introduced in the Filipino franchise in 2020 during the second season of The Voice Teens.

=== Performances ===
This season has the only distinction among Philippine editions of The Voice wherein artists are only allowed to perform Original Pilipino Music (OPM) songs until the Semi-Finals, in a similarity to I Love OPM and We Love OPM in 2016. Nievera added that the show wanted to keep OPM alive.

This season followed the format of the season 3 semifinals wherein a viewer had a chance to vote a young artist from each team (top 3 artists of each team) to enter the live finale. For the third time (since season 3), only three young artists (one per team) advanced to the live finals.

== Teams ==
- Winner
- Runner-up
- Third place

- Eliminated in the Live Semifinals
- Eliminated in the Sing-offs
- Stolen in the Battles
- Eliminated in the Battles

Coaches	Top 54 artists				
Martin Nievera (MarTeam)					
Martin Nievera (MarTeam)	Rai Fernandez	Giuliana Chiong	Patricia delos Santos	Aera Castro	Fabio Santos
Martin Nievera (MarTeam)	John David Centeno	Rafa Tan	Billy Lontayao	Camille Mataga	Deion Ang
Martin Nievera (MarTeam)	Jade Casildo	Jamer Cabacaba	Kai Marmeto	Kendall Valerio	Krizel Mabalay
Martin Nievera (MarTeam)	Misha Tabarez	Sean Matthew Drece	Vino Fernandez	Ysabelle Cruz	
KZ Tandingan (Team Supreme)					
KZ Tandingan (Team Supreme)	Xai Martinez	Marc Antillion	Leira Raynes	Abigail Libosada	Honey Centeno
KZ Tandingan (Team Supreme)	Kreya Morta	Luke Daniel dela Cruz	~~Aera Castro~~	~~Sab Paica~~	Dylan Genicera
KZ Tandingan (Team Supreme)	Janicka Lorenzo	Lucho Bobis	Noah Dongon	Princess Villanil	Renzo Niez
KZ Tandingan (Team Supreme)	Rhian Zeph Tiwana	Savannah Pudadera	Summer Pulido	Zoe Quizol	
Bamboo Mañalac (Kamp Kawayan)					
Bamboo Mañalac (Kamp Kawayan)	Shane Bernabe	Princess J Cañete	Sab Paica	Akiesha Singh	Chloe Cañega
Bamboo Mañalac (Kamp Kawayan)	Marvy Shey Villalobo	Tin-Tin Marty	~~Abigail Libosada~~	Candice Flores	Chaelna Vhea Magnaye
Bamboo Mañalac (Kamp Kawayan)	Charyl Deanne Pardo	Francheska Nora	Girah Synett Paguirigan	Janrel Villacruel	John Matthew Bendoy
Bamboo Mañalac (Kamp Kawayan)	Kathryn Ashley Tenorio	Kirsten Uy	Kzhoebe Nichole Baker	Maria Christina Aguilar	
Note: Italicized names are stolen artists (names struck through within former teams).

== Blind auditions ==
The season began with the "Blind auditions" on February 25, 2023. In each audition, a young artist performs an Original Pilipino Music (OPM) song to the three coaches whose chairs are facing away from the stage and the artist. If the coach is interested in working with the artist, they can press their button to make themselves available for the artist to be chosen as their coach. If only one coach pressed their button, the artist is defaulted to that coach's team; if multiple coaches press their button, the coaches compete for the artist, with the artist choosing which team to join. Each coach is given one block to prevent a fellow coach from getting an artist. Each coach recruits 18 young artists into their teams, totaling 54 advancing to the Battles.

Unlike in the previous seasons, only Original Pilipino Music (OPM) songs were performed throughout the entire season until the Final Showdown.

The coaches performed "Bawat Bata" by APO Hiking Society at the beginning of the pilot episode.

✔	Coach hit his/her "I WANT YOU" button
	Artist defaulted to this coach's team
	Artist elected to join this coach's team
	Artist eliminated with no coach pressing his or her "I WANT YOU" button
✘	Coach pressed "I WANT YOU" button, but was blocked by Martin
✘	Coach pressed "I WANT YOU" button, but was blocked by KZ
✘	Coach pressed "I WANT YOU" button, but was blocked by Bamboo

=== Episode 1 (February 25) ===
Among the auditionees is Fabio Santos, who is the nephew of Fana who competed in the first season of The Voice Teens Philippines.

First episode results
Order	Artist	Age	Hometown	Song	Coach's and contestant's choices		
Order	Artist	Age	Hometown	Song	Martin	KZ	Bamboo
1	Summer Pulido	8	Pangasinan	"Gusto Ko Nang Bumitaw"	✔	✔	—
2	Fabio Santos	6	Quezon City	"Nosi Balasi"	✔	—	—
3	Zahara Mashykhi	10	Batangas	"Lipad ng Pangarap"	—	—	—
4	John Matthew Bendoy	11	Batangas	"Hanggang Dito Na Lang"	—	—	✔
5	Tin-Tin Marty	12	Zambales	"Isa Pang Araw"	✔	✔	✔

=== Episode 2 (February 26) ===
Among the auditionees this episode was Rafa Tan, who is the son of OPM singer Roselle Nava.

Second episode results
Order	Artist	Age	Hometown	Song	Coach's and contestant's choices		
Order	Artist	Age	Hometown	Song	Martin	KZ	Bamboo
1	Patricia Delos Santos	12	San Jose Del Monte, Bulacan	"Isang Linggong Pag-Ibig"	✔	✔	✔
2	Rafa Tan	10	Parañaque	"Bakit Nga Ba Mahal Kita"	✔	—	—
3	Renzo Niez	11	Casiguran, Aurora	"Usahay"	—	✔	✔
4	Aera Castro	11	Cabuyao, Laguna	"Di Na Muli"	—	✔	—
5	Chloe Cañega	8	Cabanatuan, Nueva Ecija	"Pangarap Na Bituin"	✔	—	✔

=== Episode 3 (March 4) ===
Third episode results
Order	Artist	Age	Hometown	Song	Coach's and contestant's choices		
Order	Artist	Age	Hometown	Song	Martin	KZ	Bamboo
1	Honey Centeno	8	Binangonan, Rizal	"Salamat, Salamat Musika"	✔	✔	✔
2	John David Centeno	11	Binangonan, Rizal	"Ika'y Mahal Pa Rin"	✔	—	—
3	Audrey Sto. Domingo	11	San Miguel, Bulacan	"Titibo-Tibo"	—	—	—
4	Xai Martinez	12	Caloocan	"Someday"	—	✔	✔
5	Chaelna Vhea Magnaye	10	Santo Tomas, Batangas	"Salamat"	✔	—	✔

=== Episode 4 (March 5) ===
Among the auditionees in this episode were Princess J Cañete, who joined Eat Bulaga! Hype Kang Bata Ka! segment in 2020 and finished as the runner-up, and Kai Marmeto, who appeared in ABS-CBN's 2019 Christmas Station ID Family is Forever.

Fourth episode results
Order	Artist	Age	Hometown	Song	Coach's and contestant's choices		
Order	Artist	Age	Hometown	Song	Martin	KZ	Bamboo
1	Alec Cruz	12	General Trias, Cavite	"Mamang Sorbetero"	—	—	—
2	Kreya Morta	12	Pinamungajan, Cebu	"Labo"	✔	✔	—
3	Kai Marmeto	10	Olongapo	"Hesus"	✔	✘	—
4	Luke Daniel Dela Cruz	11	Baguio	"Pangako"	—	✔	—
5	Princess J Cañete	12	Antipolo	"At Ang Hirap"	✔	✔	✔

=== Episode 5 (March 11) ===
Among the auditionees in this episode was Kzhoebe Nichole Baker, who joined Eat Bulaga!'s Little Miss Philippines segment in 2019 and immediately returned to GMA Network after the competition.

Fifth episode results
Order	Artist	Age	Hometown	Song	Coach's and contestant's choices		
Order	Artist	Age	Hometown	Song	Martin	KZ	Bamboo
1	Ysabelle Cruz	10	Bacoor, Cavite	"Amakabogera"	✔	✔	—
2	Kzhoebe Nichole Baker	8	Santa Rosa, Laguna	"Mabagal"	✔	—	✔
3	Rhian Zeph Tiwana	12	Tigbauan, Iloilo	"Di Na Muli"	✔	✔	✔
4	Deion Ang	9	General Trias, Cavite	"Kahit Maputi Na Ang Buhok Ko"	✔	—	—
5	Kathryn Ashley Tenorio	11	Tanauan, Batangas	"Isa Pang Araw"	✔	—	✔

=== Episode 6 (March 12) ===
Sixth episode results
Order	Artist	Age	Hometown	Song	Coach's and contestant's choices		
Order	Artist	Age	Hometown	Song	Martin	KZ	Bamboo
1	Candice Flores	8	Dasmarinas, Cavite	"Naririnig Mo Ba"	—	—	✔
2	Sab Paica	11	Santo Tomas, Batangas	"Huwag Mo Nang Itanong"	—	✔	✔
3	Francheska Nora	12	Tanauan, Batangas	"Araw-Gabi"	—	✔	✔
4	Aiv Belen	11	Makati City	"Panalangin"	—	—	—
5	Savannah Pudadera	10	Dasmariñas, Cavite	"Dukha"	✔	✔	✔

=== Episode 7 (March 18) ===
Among the auditionees this episode was Zoe Quizol, who joined the first iteration of It's Showtime segment Mini Ms. U before the COVID-19 pandemic.

Seventh episode results
Order	Artist	Age	Hometown	Song	Coach's and contestant's choices		
Order	Artist	Age	Hometown	Song	Martin	KZ	Bamboo
1	Krizel Mabalay	12	Nueva Ecija	"Hindi Na Nga"	✔	—	—
2	Prince Dave Ivan Bagona	12	Taguig	"Mula Sa Puso"	—	—	—
3	Kevin Haber	12	Sto. Niño, Albay	"Nasa Puso"	—	—	—
4	Raine Minor	8	Santa Ana, Cagayan	"Nag-Iisang Bituin"	—	—	—
5	Zion Esmane	11	Antipolo	"At Ang Hirap"	—	—	—
6	Jade Casildo	11	Anao, Tarlac	"Patuloy Ang Pangarap"	✔	—	✔
7	Kendall Valerio	6	Marilao, Bulacan	"Kumpas (Rewritten)"	✔	—	—
8	Zoe Quizol	10	Quezon City	"Ano Kaya Ang Kapalaran"	✔	✔	✔

=== Episode 8 (March 19) ===
Among the auditionees this episode was Kaitlyn Repking, who was a contestant in SM Little Stars 2018.

Eighth episode results
Order	Artist	Age	Hometown	Song	Coach's and contestant's choices		
Order	Artist	Age	Hometown	Song	Martin	KZ	Bamboo
1	Janrel Villacruel	9	Muntinlupa	"With a Smile"	✔	—	✔
2	Kaitlyn Repking	12	Baliwag, Bulacan	"Bonggahan"	—	—	—
3	Giani Sarita	9	Laguna	"Nosi Balasi"	—	—	—
4	Rai Fernandez	12	Camarines Sur	"Lipad Ng Pangarap"	✔	—	—
5	Charyl Deanne Pardo	10	Madridejos, Cebu	"Rain"	—	—	✔
6	Shane Bernabe	12	Santa Rosa, Laguna	"Dukha"	✔	✔	✔

=== Episode 9 (March 25) ===
Ninth episode results
Order	Artist	Age	Hometown	Song	Coach's and contestant's choices		
Order	Artist	Age	Hometown	Song	Martin	KZ	Bamboo
1	Camille Mataga	12	Valenzuela City	"Ngayon at Kailanman"	✔	—	✔
2	Thalia Sanders	12	Las Pinas City	"Catch Me I'm Falling"	—	—	—
3	Marvy Shey Villalobo	12	Candelaria, Quezon	"Luha"	—	—	✔
4	Akiesha Singh	12	Baliwag, Bulacan	"Sa Ugoy ng Duyan"	—	—	✔
5	Julia Tambiga	7	Balagtas, Bulacan	"Habang May Buhay"	—	—	—
6	Cloe Ramento	10	Binangonan, Rizal	"Saan Darating ang Umaga"	—	—	—
7	Prince Banastao	10	Santo Tomas, Batangas	"Malayo Pa ang Umaga"	—	—	—
8	Janicka Lorenzo	11	San Jose Del Monte, Bulacan	"Titibo-Tibo"	—	✔	—
9	Lucho Bobis	11	Tuguegarao City, Cagayan	"Himala"	✔	✔	✔

=== Episode 10 (March 26) ===
Tenth episode results
Order	Artist	Age	Hometown	Song	Coach's and contestant's choices		
Order	Artist	Age	Hometown	Song	Martin	KZ	Bamboo
1	Billy Lontayao	10	Taguig	"Hanggang"	✔	—	—
2	Kirsten Uy	12	Tayabas, Quezon	"Shine"	✔	—	✔
3	Dranreb Garcilla	11	Antipolo, Rizal	"Nasa Inyo Na Ang Lahat"	—	—	—
4	James de Castro	12	Indang, Cavite	"Salamat"	—	—	—
5	Princess Villanil	12	Pasay City	"Kumpas"	✔	✔	✔
6	Iyana Yturralde	11	Pampanga	"Paubaya"	—	—	—
7	Marc Antillion	11	Dubai	"Ikaw Lang"	✔	✔	✔

=== Episode 11 (April 1) ===
Eleventh episode results
Order	Artist	Age	Hometown	Song	Coach's and contestant's choices		
Order	Artist	Age	Hometown	Song	Martin	KZ	Bamboo
1	Misha Tabarez	10	Cabuyao	"Luha"	✔	✘	✔
2	Noah Dongon	12	Bulacan	"Tatsulok"	—	✔	—^{[a]}
3	Shawn Agustin	10	San Nicolas, Pangasinan	"Tagu-taguan"	—	—	—
4	Sean Matthew Drece	12	San Juan, Batangas	"Ikaw Ang Aking Pangarap"	✔	—	—
5	Alijah San Miguel	8	Quezon City	"Anak Ng Pasig"	—	—	—
6	Athena Perez	7	Butuan	"I Can"	—	—	—
7	Clet Fiegalan	9	Marinduque	"Babalik Sa'Yo"	—	—	—
8	Girah Synett Paguirigan	9	Ilocos Norte	"Gusto Ko Nang Bumitaw"	✔	—	✔

Notes
a. KZ pressed her block button for Bamboo but he did not turn.

=== Episode 12 (April 2) ===
Twelfth episode results
Order	Artist	Age	Hometown	Song	Coach's and contestant's choices		
Order	Artist	Age	Hometown	Song	Martin	KZ	Bamboo
1	Leira Raynes	12	Caloocan City	"Paraiso"	✔	✔	✔
2	Via Talion	11	Calamba, Laguna	"Oo"	—	—	—
3	Vino Fernandez	10	Biñan, Laguna	"Akin Ka Na Lang"	✔	—	—
4	Ma. Christina Aguilar	12	Nueva Ecija	"Tunay na Mahal"	—	—	✔
5	Quindrix Guazon	9	Quezon City	"Bulag, Pipi at Bingi"	—	—	—
6	Jediah Manzano	12	Imus, Cavite	"Follow Your Dream"	—	—	—
7	Kyle Bachmann	12	Orion, Bataan	"Buwan"	—	—	—
8	Jonrick Solas	11	Taytay, Rizal	"Ililigtas Ka Niya"	—	—	—
9	Abigail Libosada	12	Malaybalay, Bukidnon	"How Could You Say You Love Me"	—	—	✔

=== Episode 13 (April 9) ===
Prior to the start of the episode's blind auditions, former co-host Kim Chiu made a guest appearance singing "Bulong" by Kitchie Nadal. At the end of the blind auditions, KZ was not able to successfully use her block. This episode was only aired on a Sunday, as there was no episode on the previous day due to Holy Week special programming on Black Saturday.

Thirteenth episode results
Order	Artist	Age	Hometown	Song	Coach's and contestant's choices		
Order	Artist	Age	Hometown	Song	Martin	KZ	Bamboo
1	Jamer Cabacaba	9	Sorsogon	"Paubaya"	✔	—	Team full
2	Pia Caduyac	12	Caloocan City	"You"	—	—	Team full
3	Giuliana Chiong	12	Ozamiz City	"Kilometro"	✔	—	Team full
4	Heart Villarico	11	Naga City, Cebu	"'Wag na 'Wag Mong Sasabihin"	Team full	—	Team full
5	Nicka Jade Lizada	11	Surigao City	"Naririnig Mo Ba"	Team full	—	Team full
6	Julianne Ubay	10	Angono, Rizal	"If Only"	Team full	—	Team full
7	Vangie Samson	12	Dasmariñas, Cavite	"Diamante"	Team full	—	Team full
8	Dylan Genicera	11	Pagbilao, Quezon	"Usok"	Team full	✔^{[a]}	Team full

Notes
a. KZ pressed her block button for Bamboo. Based on the actual taping order, Bamboo has remaining spots on his team. Nevertheless, Bamboo did not turn.

== The Battles ==
The second stage of the show, The Battles, aired on April 15, with 54 artists advancing to this round. All match-ups were announced on April 9, the final episode of the blind auditions. The coaches pit three of their artists in a singing match and then select one of them to advance to the next round. The ability to steal an artist from other teams continued this season. Losing artists may be "stolen" by another coach via Steal Deal. Same as the last season, the steals were done off-stage, where the coaches must go to the artists with their families backstage to steal the artist they want to become the member of their team.

At the end of this round, seven artists remained on each team; six were the battle winners, and one from a steal. In total, 21 artists advanced to the sing-offs.

Color key

Artist was chosen by his/her coach to advance to the Sing-offs
Artist was stolen by another coach and advanced to the Sing-offs
Artist was eliminated

Battles results
Episode	Coach	Order	Winning Artist	Song	Losing Artists	'Steal' result		
Episode	Coach	Order	Winning Artist	Song	Losing Artists	Martin	KZ	Bamboo
Episode 14 (April 15, 2023)	Martin Nievera	1	Patricia Delos Santos	"Anak"	Krizel Mabalay	N/A	—	—
Episode 14 (April 15, 2023)	Martin Nievera	1	Patricia Delos Santos	"Anak"	Sean Matthew Drece	N/A	—	—
Episode 14 (April 15, 2023)	KZ Tandingan	2	Xai Martinez	"Tadhana"	Janicka Lorenzo	—	N/A	—
Episode 14 (April 15, 2023)	KZ Tandingan	2	Xai Martinez	"Tadhana"	Zoe Quizol	—	N/A	—
Episode 14 (April 15, 2023)	Bamboo Mañalac	3	Princess J Cañete	"Kaleidoscope World"	Candice Flores	—	—	N/A
Episode 14 (April 15, 2023)	Bamboo Mañalac	3	Princess J Cañete	"Kaleidoscope World"	Abigail Libosada	—	✔	N/A
Episode 15 (April 16, 2023)	Bamboo Mañalac	1	Tin-Tin Marty	"When I Met You"	Francheska Nora	—	Team full	N/A
Episode 15 (April 16, 2023)	Bamboo Mañalac	1	Tin-Tin Marty	"When I Met You"	Kathryn Ashley Tenorio	—	Team full	N/A
Episode 15 (April 16, 2023)	Martin Nievera	2	Fabio Santos	"Kumusta Ka"	Kendall Valerio	N/A	Team full	—
Episode 15 (April 16, 2023)	Martin Nievera	2	Fabio Santos	"Kumusta Ka"	Deion Ang	N/A	Team full	—
Episode 15 (April 16, 2023)	KZ Tandingan	3	Luke Daniel Dela Cruz	"Pagsubok"	Lucho Bobis	—	Team full	—
Episode 15 (April 16, 2023)	KZ Tandingan	3	Luke Daniel Dela Cruz	"Pagsubok"	Noah Dongon	—	Team full	—
Episode 15 (April 16, 2023)	Bamboo Mañalac	4	Chloe Cañega	"Give Me Your Forever"	Kzhoebe Nichole Baker	—	Team full	N/A
Episode 15 (April 16, 2023)	Bamboo Mañalac	4	Chloe Cañega	"Give Me Your Forever"	Janrel Villacruel	—	Team full	N/A
Episode 16 (April 22, 2023)	Bamboo Mañalac	1	Shane Bernabe	"Next in Line"	Chaelna Vhea Magnaye	—	Team full	N/A
Episode 16 (April 22, 2023)	Bamboo Mañalac	1	Shane Bernabe	"Next in Line"	Charyl Deanne Pardo	—	Team full	N/A
Episode 16 (April 22, 2023)	Martin Nievera	2	Rafa Tan	"Pag-ibig"	Jamer Cabacaba	N/A	Team full	—
Episode 16 (April 22, 2023)	Martin Nievera	2	Rafa Tan	"Pag-ibig"	Kai Marmeto	N/A	Team full	—
Episode 16 (April 22, 2023)	KZ Tandingan	3	Honey Centeno	"Makita Kang Muli"	Renzo Niez	—	Team full	—
Episode 16 (April 22, 2023)	KZ Tandingan	3	Honey Centeno	"Makita Kang Muli"	Summer Pulido	—	Team full	—
Episode 16 (April 22, 2023)	KZ Tandingan	4	Marc Antillion	"Leaves"	Princess Villanil	—	Team full	—
Episode 16 (April 22, 2023)	KZ Tandingan	4	Marc Antillion	"Leaves"	Sab Paica	—	Team full	✔
Episode 17 (April 23, 2023)	Martin Nievera	1	Rai Fernandez	"Dahil Tanging Ikaw"	Jade Casildo	N/A	Team full	Team full
Episode 17 (April 23, 2023)	Martin Nievera	1	Rai Fernandez	"Dahil Tanging Ikaw"	Camille Mataga	N/A	Team full	Team full
Episode 17 (April 23, 2023)	Bamboo Mañalac	2	Akiesha Singh	"Someday"	Ma. Christina Aguilar	—	Team full	Team full
Episode 17 (April 23, 2023)	Bamboo Mañalac	2	Akiesha Singh	"Someday"	Girah Synett Paguirigan	—	Team full	Team full
Episode 17 (April 23, 2023)	Martin Nievera	3	John David Centeno	"Narito"	Vino Fernandez	N/A	Team full	Team full
Episode 17 (April 23, 2023)	Martin Nievera	3	John David Centeno	"Narito"	Billy Lontayao	N/A	Team full	Team full
Episode 17 (April 23, 2023)	KZ Tandingan	4	Leira Raynes	"'Di Ka Nag-iisa"	Savannah Pudadera	—	Team full	Team full
Episode 17 (April 23, 2023)	KZ Tandingan	4	Leira Raynes	"'Di Ka Nag-iisa"	Rhian Zeph Tiwana	—	Team full	Team full
Episode 18 (April 29, 2023)	KZ Tandingan	1	Kreya Morta	"Imposible"	Dylan Genicera	—	Team full	Team full
Episode 18 (April 29, 2023)	KZ Tandingan	1	Kreya Morta	"Imposible"	Aera Castro	✔	Team full	Team full
Episode 18 (April 29, 2023)	Bamboo Mañalac	2	Marvy Shey Villalobo	"Call"	John Matthew Bendoy	Team full	Team full	Team full
Episode 18 (April 29, 2023)	Bamboo Mañalac	2	Marvy Shey Villalobo	"Call"	Kirsten Uy	Team full	Team full	Team full
Episode 18 (April 29, 2023)	Martin Nievera	3	Giuliana Chiong	"Yugyugan Na"	Ysabelle Cruz	Team full	Team full	Team full
Episode 18 (April 29, 2023)	Martin Nievera	3	Giuliana Chiong	"Yugyugan Na"	Misha Tabarez	Team full	Team full	Team full

== The Sing-offs ==
The third stage of the show, the Sing-offs were aired from April 30 to May 7, 2023, comprising episodes 19 through 21. 21 artists competed in the round. In this stage, each artist performs for their coaches with a song of their choosing. At the end of the round, each coach selected three of their artists to advance to the live shows, with a total of nine artists advancing to the next round.

Color key

Artist was chosen by their coach to advance to the live semifinals
Artist was eliminated

Sing-offs results
Episode	Coach	Order	Artist	Song	Result
Episode 19 (April 30, 2023)	Martin Nievera	1	Rai Fernandez	"Ikaw ay Ako"	Advanced
Episode 19 (April 30, 2023)	Martin Nievera	2	Aera Castro	"Kahit Ayaw Mo Na"	Eliminated
Episode 19 (April 30, 2023)	Martin Nievera	3	John David Centeno	"Lupa"	Eliminated
Episode 19 (April 30, 2023)	Martin Nievera	4	Giuliana Chiong	"Mama"	Advanced
Episode 19 (April 30, 2023)	Martin Nievera	5	Rafa Tan	"Kailangan Kita"	Eliminated
Episode 19 (April 30, 2023)	Martin Nievera	6	Fabio Santos	"Banal na Aso, Santong Kabayo"	Eliminated
Episode 19 (April 30, 2023)	Martin Nievera	7	Patricia Delos Santos	"Till My Heartaches End"	Advanced
Episode 20 (May 6, 2023)	Bamboo Mañalac	1	Shane Bernabe	"Kisapmata"	Advanced
Episode 20 (May 6, 2023)	Bamboo Mañalac	2	Princess J Cañete	"Phoenix"	Advanced
Episode 20 (May 6, 2023)	Bamboo Mañalac	3	Akiesha Singh	"Gaano Ko Ikaw Kamahal"	Eliminated
Episode 20 (May 6, 2023)	Bamboo Mañalac	4	Marvy Shey Villalobo	"Tagumpay Nating Lahat"	Eliminated
Episode 20 (May 6, 2023)	Bamboo Mañalac	5	Sab Paica	"I'll Be Alright"	Advanced
Episode 20 (May 6, 2023)	Bamboo Mañalac	6	Chloe Cañega	"Handog"	Eliminated
Episode 20 (May 6, 2023)	Bamboo Mañalac	7	Tin-Tin Marty	"Kahit Ako'y Lupa"	Eliminated
Episode 21 (May 7, 2023)	KZ Tandingan	1	Xai Martinez	"Hindi Tayo Pwede"	Advanced
Episode 21 (May 7, 2023)	KZ Tandingan	2	Kreya Morta	"Mas Mabuti Pa"	Eliminated
Episode 21 (May 7, 2023)	KZ Tandingan	3	Honey Centeno	"Pangarap na Bituin"	Eliminated
Episode 21 (May 7, 2023)	KZ Tandingan	4	Abigail Libosada	"Awit Kay Inay"	Eliminated
Episode 21 (May 7, 2023)	KZ Tandingan	5	Luke Daniel dela Cruz	"Minsan Lang Kita Iibigin"	Eliminated
Episode 21 (May 7, 2023)	KZ Tandingan	6	Leira Raynes	"Di Matitinag"	Advanced
Episode 21 (May 7, 2023)	KZ Tandingan	7	Marc Antillion	"Binalewala"	Advanced

== Live shows ==
=== Week 1: Semifinals (May 13–14) ===
The Top 9 artists competed for the public's votes to advance to the finals; the contestants with the most votes within their team moved forward, creating a total of three finalists who advanced to the finale. Held at the ABS-CBN Studios, Team Supreme and Kamp Kawayan performed on the first episode, while MarTeam performed on the latter episode, where the results of the round were announced.

Color key:

Artist was received the most votes within their team advanced to the Grand Finals
Artist was eliminated

Live semifinals results
Episode	Coach	Order	Artist	Song	Votes	Result
Episode 22 (May 13, 2023)	KZ Tandingan	1	Leira Raynes	"Sabihin Mo Sa Akin"	21.41%	Eliminated
Episode 22 (May 13, 2023)	KZ Tandingan	2	Marc Antillion	"Sa Mga Bituin Na Lang Ibubulong"	26.96%	Eliminated
Episode 22 (May 13, 2023)	KZ Tandingan	3	Xai Martinez	"Sana Maulit Muli"	51.62%	Advanced
Episode 22 (May 13, 2023)	Bamboo Mañalac	1	Princess J Cañete	"Magkaibang Mundo"	26.83%	Eliminated
Episode 22 (May 13, 2023)	Bamboo Mañalac	2	Sab Paica	"Binibini"	18.74%	Eliminated
Episode 22 (May 13, 2023)	Bamboo Mañalac	3	Shane Bernabe	"Upuan"	54.42%	Advanced
Episode 23 (May 14, 2023)	Martin Nievera	1	Guiliana Chiong	"Matibay"	37.58%	Eliminated
Episode 23 (May 14, 2023)	Martin Nievera	2	Rai Fernandez	"Ikaw Ang Aking Mahal"	47.86%	Advanced
Episode 23 (May 14, 2023)	Martin Nievera	3	Patricia Delos Santos	"Saan Darating Ang Umaga"	14.54%	Eliminated

Non-competition performances
Order	Performers	Song
22.1	Coaches with their teams (Bamboo Mañalac, Princess J Cañete, Sab Paica, Shane Bernabe) (KZ Tandingan, Leira Raynes, Marc Antillon, Xai Martinez) (Martin Nievera, Giuliana Chiong, Patricia delos Santos, Rai Fernandez)	"Kilos Kabataan"
23.1	Adie	"Paraluman"
23.1	Adie	"Tahanan"

=== Week 2: The Final Showdown (May 20–21) ===
The live finale aired from May 20 to 21. The finale was contested by the three finalists from each team. Unlike in the previous rounds, where only Original Pilipino Music (OPM) songs were performed, this round was the first and only for the season to feature foreign/international songs.

Jolina Magdangal served as a guest host for this round, as Bianca Gonzalez was absent due to health-related reasons.

With Bernabe's victory, she is the second three-chair turner to win a season, after Vanjoss Bayaban. She is also the first female three-chair turner to win an entire season.

Color Key

Artist was proclaimed as the winner
Artist ended as the runner-up
Artist ended as the third placer

Finale results
Coach	Artist	Episode 24 (May 20, 2023)				Episode 25 (May 21, 2023)		Votes	Result
Coach	Artist	Order	Duet With Coach	Order	Upbeat Showstopper	Order	Power Ballad	Votes	Result
Martin Nievera	Rai Fernandez	1	"You Are To Me"	5	"Dance Monkey"	1	"Kailangan Ko'y Ikaw"	40.65%	Runner-up
KZ Tandingan	Xai Martinez	2	"Kabilang Buhay"	4	"Amakabogera"	3	"I Am Changing"	8.30%	Third Place
Bamboo Mañalac	Shane Bernabe	3	"Somewhere Over The Rainbow"	6	"Sirena"	2	"Sino Ang Baliw"	51.05%	Winner

=== Awit Ng Kabataan: Boses Ng Kinabukasan ===
Awit Ng Kabataan: Boses Ng Kinabukasan is a post-season special episode that was aired on the weekend after the Final Showdown. It featured performances from the season's contestants, coaches and several other special guests.

== Results summary ==
Color key

Results color key
Winner	Saved by the public
Runner-up	Eliminated
Third place

Coaches color key
MarTeam
Team Supreme
Kamp Kawayan

Live show results per week
Artist	Week 1	Week 2
Shane Bernabe	Safe	Winner
Rai Fernandez	Safe	Runner-Up
Xai Martinez	Safe	Third Place
Guiliana Chiong	Eliminated	Eliminated (Week 1)
Leira Raynes	Eliminated	Eliminated (Week 1)
Marc Antillion	Eliminated	Eliminated (Week 1)
Patricia Delos Santos	Eliminated	Eliminated (Week 1)
Princess J Cañete	Eliminated	Eliminated (Week 1)
Sab Paica	Eliminated	Eliminated (Week 1)
