= Champ Lui Pio =

Filipino musician

- Champ with the rest of Hale during Tandag City's 14th Sangkaan Festival, 2026

Background information
- Born: Arthur Bernard Dolino Lui Pio; February 8, 1982 (age 44); Quezon City, Philippines
- Genres: Alternative rock; Pop rock; OPM
- Occupations: Singer; Songwriter; Guitarist; Record producer
- Instruments: Vocals; Guitar
- Years active: 2004–present
- Member of: Hale

Arthur Bernard Dolino Lui Pio (born February 8, 1982), professionally known as Champ Lui Pio, is a Filipino singer, songwriter, guitarist and record producer. He is best known as the lead vocalist and guitarist of the alternative rock band Hale, which emerged in the Philippine music scene in the mid-2000s and became known for songs including "The Day You Said Goodnight", "Broken Sonnet", "Kung Wala Ka" and "Kahit Pa".

Lui Pio became a prominent figure in Philippine alternative rock after Hale released its self-titled debut album in 2005. The album achieved triple-platinum status in the Philippines and established the band as one of the country's prominent new rock acts of the period. Hale subsequently released Twilight (2006), Above, Over and Beyond (2008) and Kundiman (2009).

Following Hale's dissolution in 2010, Lui Pio began a solo career and released his debut album Synergy through PolyEast Records. Its first single, "Hanging Habagat", was premiered on Philippine radio in October 2010. He also established the independent record label Mecca Music and became involved in developing emerging artists, including electronic pop musician Rez Toledo, known professionally as Somedaydream.

Hale reunited in 2015 and released the six-track EP Time and Space that year. The group later released Alon in 2018. After a six-year gap between releases, Hale returned in 2024 with the single "Klaro", co-written by Lui Pio and guitarist Roll Martinez.

== Early life and education ==
Arthur Bernard Dolino Lui Pio was born on February 8, 1982, in Quezon City, Philippines. He is the son of Filipino musician and composer Arturo Lui-Pio, known professionally as Nonoy Tan. His father was a member of the 1980s group Wadab and later worked as a songwriter and producer.

Lui Pio studied at De La Salle University–College of Saint Benilde, where he took Human Resource Management, before choosing to pursue music professionally. His younger brother is television personality and sports broadcaster Christian "Chino" Lui Pio, who previously worked as a MYX video jockey.

Lui Pio began writing music at a young age. His father said in a 2009 interview that he had composed his own song by the age of 10.

== Career ==
=== Hale ===
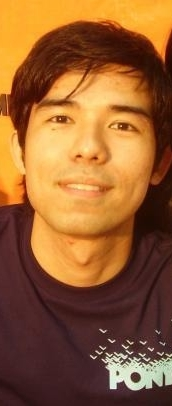
Champ during an autograph session

Lui Pio began his professional music career as the vocalist and guitarist of Hale, which was formed in Manila in 2004. The original lineup consisted of Lui Pio, guitarist Roll Martinez, bassist Sheldon Gellada and drummer Omnie Saroca.

Hale released its self-titled debut album in 2005. The album produced several successful singles, including "The Day You Said Goodnight", "Broken Sonnet", "Kahit Pa" and "Kung Wala Ka". The Philippine Star reported that the album became the best-selling album by a new artist in the Philippines in 2005 and eventually reached triple-platinum status, representing sales of 90,000 units at the time.

The band followed the debut with Twilight in 2006. The album continued Hale's commercial success and included songs such as "Shooting Star", "Waltz" and "Pitong Araw".

Hale released Above, Over and Beyond in 2008 and Kundiman in 2009. During this period, the group became associated with the melodramatic strain of Philippine alternative rock sometimes described in local media as "melo-drama".

Lui Pio was also involved in Treehouse Productions, a music-oriented outreach initiative associated with Hale that organized activities and benefit events for charitable causes.

In August 2010, Hale announced that its members would pursue separate projects. Lui Pio subsequently began work on a solo career.

=== Solo career and Mecca Music ===
Lui Pio began his solo career in 2010 while continuing his work in music production. His first solo single, "Hanging Habagat", was premiered nationally on Philippine radio on October 19, 2010.

His debut solo album, Synergy, was released by PolyEast Records in November 2010. The album was written and recorded during a three-month break from Hale and featured collaborations with Julianne Tarroja, Chris Padilla of Hilera, Noel Cabangon, Chito Miranda of Parokya ni Edgar, Monty Macalino of Mayonnaise and Gloc-9.

The album incorporated a variety of guest musicians and songwriters, reflecting Lui Pio's move away from working solely within a single band. Songs associated with the album included "Hanging Habagat", "Sa 'Yo Lang", "Sari-Saring Kwento", "Gulong", "Magdamag", "Juan Tamad", "Emergency Room", "Bleed" and "Nightmares".

After leaving Hale, Lui Pio established the independent label Mecca Music. He managed and developed Rez Toledo, better known as Somedaydream, whose single "Hey Daydreamer" became the label's early public release.

Lui Pio described the label as an attempt to take a different approach to developing artists in an independent setting. He also said he wanted to produce and manage emerging musicians instead of concentrating exclusively on his own recording career.

=== Hale reunion ===
Hale reunited in 2015 after a five-year separation. The returning lineup featured Lui Pio, Gellada, Martinez and Paolo Santiago.

The reunion produced the single "See You", followed by the six-track EP Time and Space, released through Warner Music Philippines in 2015. Lui Pio said the group initially chose smaller venues for its comeback because it wanted the reunion performances to feel more personal and to rebuild its relationship with its audience.

Hale later released the album Alon in 2018. The group subsequently entered a period without new recorded material.

In 2024, Hale returned with "Klaro", its first release in six years. The song was written by Lui Pio and Roll Martinez and was issued during the band's renewed partnership with Universal Music Group Philippines and the relaunch of EMI Records Philippines.

In 2024, Lui Pio also appeared onstage with the Filipino girl group Bini during an Alpas La Union performance, where they performed Hale's "Kung Wala Ka".

=== Recent work ===
In October 2025, Lui Pio collaborated with singer-songwriter Miguel Escueta on the single "Pangako Ng Bukas". Apple Music lists the song as Lui Pio's latest solo release. The track was later described by Escueta as a mental-health and wellness advocacy song released in connection with Mental Health Philippines during Mental Health Awareness Month.

== Artistry ==
=== Musical style ===
Lui Pio's best-known work is associated with Philippine alternative rock and pop rock. His work with Hale is built around melodic guitar-driven arrangements and emotionally direct songwriting, while his solo album Synergy used a broader range of guest performers and collaborators.

Hale's early material became strongly associated with romantic and emotionally driven songs such as "The Day You Said Goodnight", "Broken Sonnet", "Kahit Pa" and "Kung Wala Ka".

During his solo period, Lui Pio expanded his work into independent artist management and production through Mecca Music.

=== Songwriting and production ===
Lui Pio has received recognition for his work as a songwriter as well as a performer. His father, Nonoy Tan, described him as musically inclined from childhood, noting that he began composing songs at an early age.

As Hale's lead vocalist and principal songwriter, Lui Pio helped write the band's catalog, while also working with other OPM musicians during his solo career.

His production work expanded following Hale's breakup, when he founded Mecca Music and developed Somedaydream's career. Candy Magazine identified Lui Pio as the owner and manager associated with Mecca Music during the launch of "Hey Daydreamer".

== Business and philanthropy ==
Lui Pio became involved in music-related entrepreneurship through Mecca Music, an independent label established after Hale's 2010 breakup.

He was also associated with Treehouse Productions, an initiative formed around music and charitable work. Contemporary coverage described the organization as involving OPM musicians in activities intended to benefit charitable causes and people in need.

Following the 2015 Hale reunion, Lui Pio and fellow musician Chito Miranda were also reported to have established the 12 Monkeys Music Hall & Pub in Makati.

== Personal life ==
Lui Pio became engaged to Claire Nery in 2018. Their son, Caden Lui Pio, was born in October 2019.

The couple married on January 24, 2022, at St. James the Great Parish in Alabang, Muntinlupa, Philippines.

== Discography ==
=== With Hale ===
- Hale (2005)
- Twilight (2006)
- Above, Over and Beyond (2008)
- Kundiman (2009)
- Time and Space (EP, 2015)
- Alon (2018)

=== Studio albums ===
- Synergy (2010)

=== Selected singles ===
- "Hanging Habagat" (2010)
- "Sa 'Yo Lang" (2010)
- "Sari-Saring Kwento" (2010)
- "Gulong" (2010)
- "Magdamag" (2010)
- "Juan Tamad" (2010)
- "Nightmares" (2010)
- "Emergency Room" (2010)
- "Bleed" (2010)
- "Pangako Ng Bukas" (2025, with Miguel Escueta)

== Awards and recognition ==
As the vocalist of Hale, Lui Pio was part of the group during its major award-winning period in the mid-2000s. Hale won the 2006 Awit Award for Best Ballad for "The Day You Said Goodnight" and received other awards for its music and videos during the same period.
