= Hale discography =

- Studio albums: 5
- Singles: 22

This is the discography of OPM music band Hale.

== Albums ==
=== Full Albums ===
Year	Album title	Certifications
2005	Hale: Released: April 2005, 2 March 2006 (Re-Release); Label: EMI Philippines	3× Platinum
2006	Twilight: Released: 30 September 2006; Label: EMI Philippines	Gold
2008	Above, Over and Beyond: Released: 28 April 2008; Label: EMI Philippines	–
2009	Kundiman: Released: 27 July 2009; Label: PolyEast Records	–
2018	Alon: Released: 14 June 2018; Label: Warner Music Philippines	–

=== Extended plays ===
Year	Album title	Certifications
2015	Time and Space: Released: 30 March 2015; Label: Warner Music Philippines	–

== Singles ==
=== Mainstream singles ===
Year	Title	Album
2005	"Broken Sonnet"	Hale
2005	"The Day You Said Goodnight"	Hale
2005	"Kahit Pa"	Hale
2005	"Kung Wala Ka"	Hale
2006	"Tollgate" ^{1}	Hale
2006	"Blue Sky"	Hale
2006	"Waltz"	Twilight
2006	"Hide And Seek"	Twilight
2007	"Shooting Star"	Twilight
2007	"The Ballad Of"	Twilight
2008	"Pitong Araw"	Above, Over And Beyond
2008	"Leap Of Faith"	Above, Over And Beyond
2009	"Over And Over (And Over Again)" ^{2}	Above, Over And Beyond
2009	"Sandali Na Lang"	Above, Over And Beyond
2009	"Bahay Kubo"	Kundiman
2009	"Kalesa"	Kundiman
2010	"Harinawa"	Kundiman
2010	"Magkaibang Mundo"	Kundiman
2015	"See You"	Time and Space
2015	"Saint or Sinner"	Time and Space
2016	"You or Nothing"	Time and Space
2018	"Alon"	Alon

^{1} Single can be found in Hale Special Edition.

=== Other released singles ===
Year	Title	Album
2006	"One Moment, One Nescafé" ^{3}	
2008	"Sundown" (Feat. Monique Rae)	Above, Over And Beyond

^{3} Non-album single.
