= 21st Awit Awards =

2008 Philippine music awards ceremony

- Date: November 26, 2008
- Location: Eastwood Central Plaza, Eastwood City, Quezon City
- Hosted by: Christian Bautista; Nikki Gil
- Preshow hosts: Richard Poon; Sitti

Highlights
- Most awards: Yeng Constantino; Civ Fontanilla (5)
- Most nominations: Bamboo (13)
- Album of the Year: Salamat by Yeng Constantino
- Song of the Year: "Ikaw" by Medwin Marfil

Television/radio coverage
- Network: myx.tv (online only)
- Directed by: GB Sampedro

The 21st Awit Awards were held on November 26, 2008, at the Eastwood Central Plaza located in Eastwood City, Quezon City. They gave excellences to the best of Filipino music for the year 2007.

Bamboo received the most nominations with thirteen. Julianne followed with twelve while Jonathan Manalo received ten nods.

The awards ceremony was broadcast live through myx website. The pre-show was hosted by Richard Poon and Sitti while the main show was hosted by Christian Bautista and Nikki Gil. Yeng Constantino and Civ Fontanilla won most of the awards with five.

== Winners and nominees ==
Winners are listed first and highlighted in bold. Nominated producers, composers and lyricists are not included in this list, unless noted. For the full list, please go to their official website.

=== Performance Awards ===
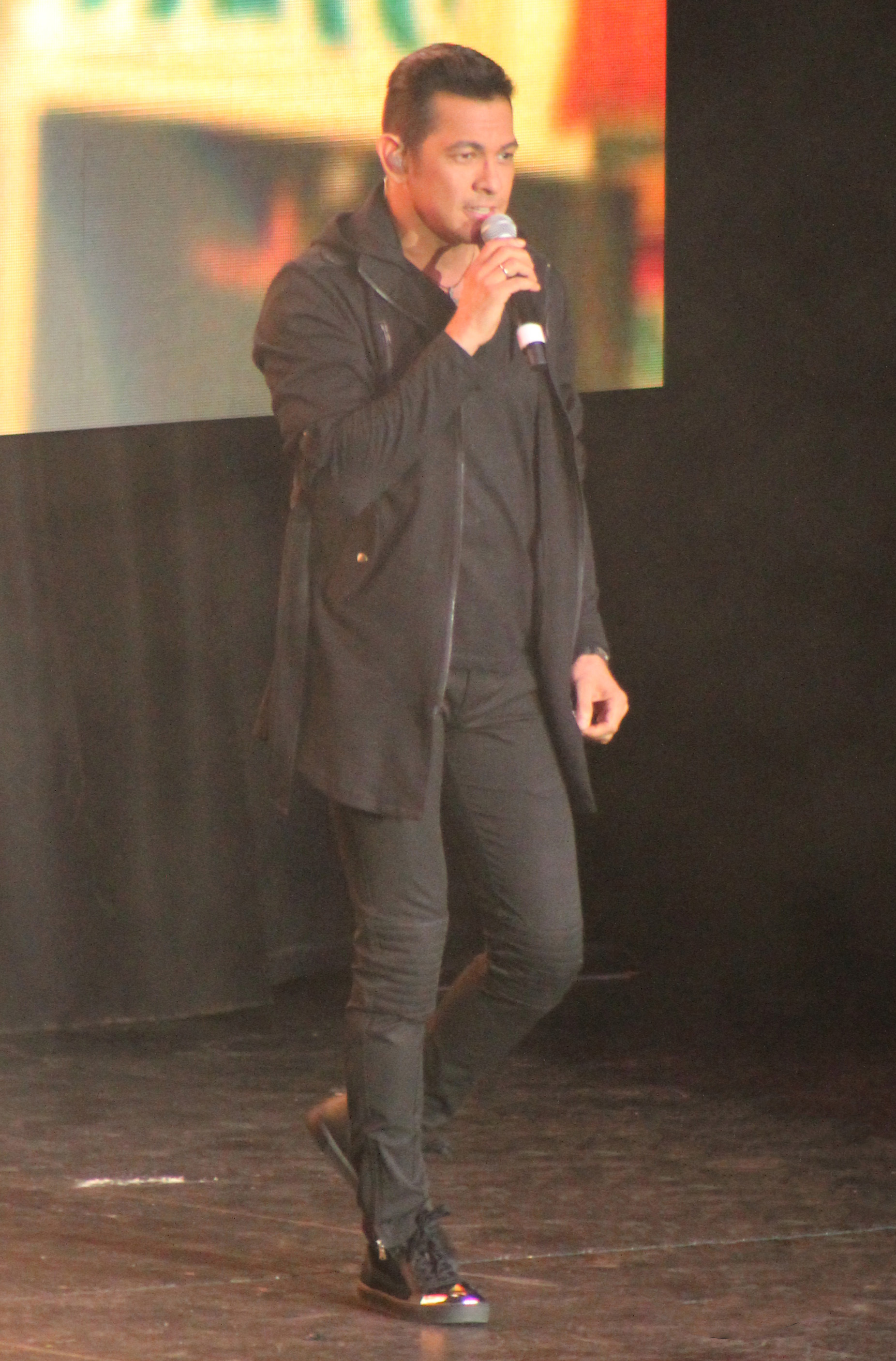
Gary Valenciano, Best Male winner

Best Performance by a Female Recording Artist	Best Performance by a Male Recording Artist
**"Tulak ng Bibig" – Julianne**; "Ikaw pa Rin" – Aicelle; "Ikaw" – Sarah Geronimo; "Love Will Lead You Back" – Kyla; "Promise Me" – Lea Salonga	**"Sana Maulit Muli" – Gary Valenciano**; "Windmills of Your Mind" – Jose Mari Chan; "Tagumpay" – Guji Lorenzana; "Hard Habit to Break" – Martin Nievera; "I’ll Take Care of You" – Richard Poon
Best Performance by a Group Recording Artists	Best Performance by a New Female Recording Artist
**"Tatsulok" – Bamboo**; "Argos" – Bamboo; "Sala" – Pupil; "So Blue" – Sinosikat?; "Evidence" – Urbandub	**"Grateful" – Julianne**; "Ugly Girl" – Miki Hahn; "Stars" – Lala; "Laya" – Nityalila; "Oh Lori" – Olivia
Best Performance by a New Male Recording Artist	Best Performance by a New Group Recording Artists
**"I’ll Take Care of You" – Richard Poon**; "Someone in the Dark" – Miguel Aguila; "Crazy but Incredible" – Brian Josef; "All My Life" – Daniel Razon; "Shake Yo Thang" – Gabriel Valenciano	**"Let Me Love You Tonight" – Ryan Cayabyab Singers**; "Why Can’t It Be" – 3rd Avenue; "Magic" – Sinosikat?; "Ale" – The Bloomfields; "Sabihin" – Zelle
Best Performance by a Duet
**"Hard Habit to Break" – Jed Madela feat. Gary Valenciano**; "Lando" – Gloc-9 feat. Francis Magalona; "Unsaid" – Lala feat. Christian Bautista; "Ang Aking Awitin" – Ronnie Liang feat. Nikki Gil; "Paano Kita Iibigin" – Piolo Pascual & Regine Velasquez

=== Creativity Awards ===
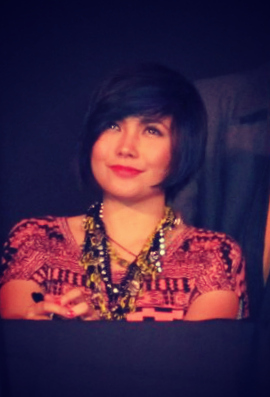
Yeng Constantino, Album of the Year winner

Album of the Year	Song of the Year
**Salamat – Yeng Constantino**; Taking Flight – Sarah Geronimo; Solid – Parokya ni Edgar; Para Lang Sa'yo – Aiza Seguerra	**"Ikaw"** **Medwin Marfil (composer & lyricist)**; "Para Lang Sa'yo" Jonathan Manalo (composer & lyricist); "Salamat" Yeng Constantino (composer & lyricist); "So Blue" Sinosikat? (composer & lyricist); "Tulak ng Bibig" Julianne Tarroja (composer & lyricist)
Best Selling Album of the Year	Best Ballad Recording
**Salamat – Yeng Constantino**	**"It's Over Now" – Kyla**; "Catch Me I'm Falling" – Toni Gonzaga; "Iisa Lang" – Parokya ni Edgar; "Para Lang Sa'yo" – Aiza Seguerra; "Sabihin" – Zelle
Best Rock Recording	Best World/Alternative/Bossa Music Recording
**"Tatsulok" – Bamboo**; "Argos" – Bamboo; "Probinsyana" – Bamboo; "Sala" – Pupil; "Guillotine" – Urbandub	**"Turning My Safety Off" – Sinosikat?**; "Sorry na, Pwede Ba?" – Brownman Revival feat. Rico J. Puno; "Empty Chairs" – Julianne; "Buwan" – Kitchie Nadal; Sala" – Pupil
Best Novelty Recording	Best Dance Recording
**"Itaktak Mo" – Joey de Leon**; "Berting" – 1017; "Cowboy - Cowgirl” – Andrew E.; "Sayaw Darling" – Willie Revillame; "Gimik" – Zoo	**"Sumayaw Ka" – Gloc-9**; "Reggae Fever" – Brownman Revival; "Tarat Tat" – Dos Fuertes; "Sexy Mama" – Janno Gibbs; "Sugarpop" – Sugarpop
Best Inspirational/Religious Recording	Best Christmas Recording
**"Salamat" – Yeng Constantino**; "Grateful" – Julianne; "Reach for the Sky" – Sarah Geronimo; "Kasama" – Aiza Seguerra; "Isang Kinabukasan" – Various Artists	**"A Perfect Christmas" – Jed Madela**; "Ikaw at Ako" – Yeng Constantino; "Pasko sa Pinas" – Yeng Constantino; "Ngayong Pasko" – Erik Santos; "Parol" – Silent Sanctuary
Best Rap Recording	Best Jazz Recording
**"Lando" – Gloc-9 feat. Francis Magalona**; "Tabatsoy Pinoy" – Brownian Method; "Tarat Tat" – Dos Fuertes; "May Pulis sa Ilalim ng Tulay" – Kawago; "Shagiddy Shapopo" – Kawago	**"Akin Ka" – Sinosikat?**; "Beacon Call" – Johnny Alegre Affinity; "Choose To Believe" – Julianne; "Empty Chairs" – Julianne; "Magic" – Sinosikat?
Best R&B Recording	Best Regional Recording
**"Let Me Love You Tonight" – Ryan Cayabyab Singers**; "Ikaw pa Rin" – Aicelle; "Back Into You" – Amber Davis; "Rainbow Coloured Sky" – Freestyle; "Pangako Yan" – Luke Mejares	**"Matud Nila" (in Cebuano) – Mark Bautista**; "Charing"(in Cebuano) – 1017; "Lami ang Guidili" (in Cebuano) – Brownian Method feat. Julie Ann Pie Nacar; "Maanyag Ka" (in Cebuano) – JayR Siaboc; "Naglibog" (in Cebuano) – JayR Siaboc
Best Song Written for Movie/TV/Stage Play
**"Paano Kita Iibigin" (from Paano Kita Iibigin) – Piolo Pascual & Regine Velasquez**; "Argos" (from Rounin) – Bamboo; "Alinlangan" (from Super Twins) – Jolina Magdangal; "Collide" (from Xenoa) – Nina; "Walang Susuko" (from Lastikman) – Parokya ni Edgar

=== Technical Achievement Awards ===
Best Musical Arrangement	Best Vocal Arrangement
**"Probinsyana" – Bamboo**; "Healing" – Dan Gil; "Grateful" – Julianne Tarroja; "Tulak ng Bibig" – Julianne Tarroja & Daniel Crisologo; "Cool Change" – Romeo Velasco, Jr.	**"Souvenirs" – Moy Ortiz**; "Love Will Lead You Back" – Arnie Mendaros; "Bato sa Buhangin" – Moy Ortiz; "Christmas Medley: Joy to the World/Good King Wenceslas/ O Come, All Ye Faithful/Hark the Herald" – Ito Rapadas, GW & Alkemi Productions; "Written in the Sand" – Danny Tan & Annie Nepomuceno
Best Engineered Recording	Best Album Package
**"Probinsyana" – Angee Rozul**; "Our Love Is Here to Stay" – Chaitanya das Tamayo & Don Manalang; "A Little Too Perfect" – Arnold Jallores; "Waiting" – Ferdie Marquez; "So Blue" – Angee Rozul	**Moonlane Gardens** **Sarah Gaugler (graphic design & photography)** **Clementine (album concept)**; The Best of Manila Sound: Hopia Mani Popcorn 2 Denim, Mia Marigomen, Bleps Carlos, Hans Malang & Mel Buensalido (graphic design) Paul Basinillo (album concept) Bleps Carlos (photography); Inspired Ronnie Salvacion (graphic design, album concept & photography); Kwento Pop John Ed de Vera (graphic design) John Ed de Vera & Blue Ketchup (album concept) Erik Liongoren (photography); Sinosikat? Unintentional.net, Aram Beheshti, Ella Saballa & Randell Centeno (graphic design) Steve Tirona (photography)
Music Video of the Year
**"Probinsyana" – Bamboo** **Pancho Esguerra (director)**; "So Far Away" – Bamboo Pancho Esguerra (director); "Time In" – Yeng Constantino Avid Liongoren (director); "Ang Katulad Mong Walang Katulad" – Orange and Lemons Marie Jamora (director); "Break na Tayo" – Rocksteddy Avid Liongoren (director)

=== People's Choice Awards ===
Best Performance by a Female Recording Artist	Best Performance by a Male Recording Artist
**"Ikaw pa Rin" – Aicelle**; "Ikaw" – Sarah Geronimo; "Tulak ng Bibig" – Julianne; "Love Will Lead You Back" – Kyla; "Promise Me" – Lea Salonga	**"Hard Habit to Break" – Martin Nievera**; "Windmills of Your Mind" – Jose Mari Chan; "Tagumpay" – Guji Lorenzana; "I’ll Take Care of You" – Richard Poon; "Sana Maulit Muli" – Gary Valenciano
Best Performance by a Group Recording Artists	Best Performance by a New Female Recording Artist
**"So Blue" – Sinosikat?**; "Argos" – Bamboo; "Tatsulok" – Bamboo; "Sala" – Pupil; "Evidence" – Urbandub	**"Oh Lori" – Olivia**; "Ugly Girl" – Miki Hahn; "Grateful" – Julianne; "Stars" – Lala; "Laya" – Nityalila
Best Performance by a New Male Recording Artist	Best Performance by a New Group Recording Artists
**"All My Life" – Daniel Razon**; "Someone in the Dark" – Miguel Aguila; "Crazy but Incredible" – Brian Josef; "I’ll Take Care of You" – Richard Poon; "Shake Yo Thang" – Gabriel Valenciano	**"Why Can’t It Be" – 3rd Avenue**; "Let Me Love You Tonight" – Ryan Cayabyab Singers; "Magic" – Sinosikat?; "Ale" – The Bloomfields; "Sabihin" – Zelle
Song of the Year	Music Video of the Year
**"Salamat"** **Yeng Constantino (composer & lyricist)**; "Ikaw" Medwin Marfil (composer & lyricist); "Para Lang Sa'yo" Jonathan Manalo (composer & lyricist); "So Blue" Sinosikat? (composer & lyricist); "Tulak ng Bibig" Julianne Tarroja (composer & lyricist)	**"Time In" – Yeng Constantino** **Avid Liongoren (director)**; "Probinsyana" – Bamboo Pancho Esguerra (director); "So Far Away" – Bamboo Pancho Esguerra (director); "Ang Katulad Mong Walang Katulad" – Orange and Lemons Marie Jamora (director); "Break na Tayo" – Rocksteddy Avid Liongoren (director)

=== Special awards ===
Lea Salonga, Dangal ng Musikang Pilipino awardee

International Achievement Award
Recipients	Achievements
**Aria Clemente**	The 2007 Junior Grand Champion Performer of the World in the World Championships of Performing Arts.
**Kjwan**	Winner of the group category in the 1st Ikon ASEAN competition.

Dangal ng Musikang Pilipino Award
- **Lea Salonga**

== Performers ==
This is in order of appearance.

Artist(s)	Song(s)
Pre-show
Callalily; Pedicab	"Susundan" "FX" "Ang Pusa Mo"
Johnny Cross	"Bawal ang Nakasimangot Dito"
Guarana	Samba dance
Main show
Rhap Salazar; The Cercados	"Lupang Hinirang"
Sandwich; 6cyclemind	"Procrastinator" "Magsasaya" "Betamax"
Itchyworms	"Gusto Ko Lamang sa Buhay"
True Faith	
Nyoy Volante	
Julianne	"Tulak ng Bibig"
MYMP	"Set You Free" (Side A cover)
Richard Poon	"I'll Take Care of You" (Ronnie Milsap cover)
Sitti	"Ngayong Pasko"
Parokya ni Edgar	"Akala"
Sinosikat?	
Cueshé	
Aicelle; Christian Bautista; Nikki Gil; Toni Gonzaga; Karylle; Ronnie Liang; Raki Vega	Homage to Lea Salonga "A Whole New World" (Aladdin) "Last Night of the World" (Miss Saigon) "Reflection" (Mulan) "Tomorrow" (Annie)
Hale	"Pitong Araw"
