= This 15 Me =

Studio album by Sarah Geronimo
- Released: April 14, 2018
- Recorded: 2017–2018
- Genre: Pop; R&B; jazz
- Language: English; Filipino
- Label: Viva
- Producer: Sarah Geronimo; Civ Fontanilla

Sarah Geronimo chronology
The Great Unknown (2015)	This 15 Me (2018)	Miss Granny Original Movie Soundtrack (2018)

Singles from This 15 Me
- 1. "Sandata" Released: January 12, 2018; 2. "Ganito" Released: April 1, 2018; 3. "Duyan" Released: April 6, 2018; 4. "Tagu-Taguan" Released: May 16, 2020

This 15 Me (styled in all caps) is the thirteenth studio album by Filipino singer-actress Sarah Geronimo. It was released on digital platforms on April 13, 2018, while physical copies became available on April 14, the day of Geronimo's 15th anniversary concert with the same title, held at the Smart Araneta Coliseum. To date the album sold 30,000 units copies including physical album copies, digital downloads and album-equivalent unit streams. The album debuted at number one on both iTunes Philippines and Macau Album Charts and also landed on international iTunes charts including the United States, Singapore and Canada.

== Release and reception ==
The album became available for downloads on April 13, 2018, and was officially released the next day, during Geronimo's 15th anniversary concert also entitled This 15 Me. The album went straight to number one on iTunes Philippines album charts and stayed on top for a week.

"Sandata" became available for pre-order on iTunes on January 10, 2018, and became the second most pre-ordered song during that time. On January 12, 2018, the day of its release, it went straight to number one on iTunes Philippines Songs Chart and stayed on top for four consecutive days. It also landed on Spotify Philippines Viral 50 at number 23. As of April 2018, the song has been played 800,000 times on Spotify, despite not having radio airplay and promotions. "Sandata" made it to the list "7 new local music releases to listen to" made by CNN Philippines, according to the article, "the song continues Sarah Geronimo's streak of Filipino dance pop anthems that began with Ikot-ikot then led us to Kilometro and Tala. While its production feels more low-key, less anthemic than past turns, "Sandata" makes up for it by finding Geronimo at her most polished and nuanced. This one's a grower, and as far as Filipino pop goes, it's a risk well-taken."

"Ganito" became available for download on iTunes on the night of March 31, 2018 and became officially released on other digital music stores and streaming services the next day.

== Track listing ==
No.	Title	Writer(s)	Arranger(s)	Length
1.	"Ganito"	Nica del Rosario, Sarah Geronimo	Rap Sanchez	4:36
2.	"Sandata"	Nica del Rosario, Julius de Belen	de Belen	3:38
3.	"Baka Sakali"	Jeric Medina	Medina	3:48
4.	"Interlude"			1:03
5.	"My Love"	Yosha Honasan	Ivan Lee Espinosa	4:12
6.	"Tagu-taguan" (featuring J. Makata)	Mat Olavides, Nica del Rosario, John Mark Cruz	Olavides	4:08
7.	"Hingan Malalim"	Nica del Rosario	Bojam de Belen	5:03
8.	"Duyan"	Thyro Alfaro, Yumi Lacsamana	Bojam de Belen	4:22
9.	"Feels Good"	Ruth Anna Mendoza	Ian Fajarito	2:12
10.	"Dahilan"	Jeric Medina	Civ Fontanilla	3:58
11.	"This Gotta Be Love"	Mark Villar	Gino Cruz	3:10

== Tour ==
This 15 Me is the promotional world tour for Sarah Geronimo's thirteenth studio album of the same name. It also celebrates Geronimo's fifteenth year in the showbiz industry. She kicked off the tour in Manila which set the record for Highest Grossing Local Concert held in Smart Araneta Coliseum in history. Netflix acquired the rights to stream the concert film starting in August 2019 making Geronimo the first Southeast Asian artist to have a concert film on the said platform.
