= Synergy (Champ Lui-Pio album) =

Studio album by Champ Lui Pio
- Released: November 19, 2010
- Genre: Alternative rock
- Length: 43:46
- Label: PolyEast Records

Singles from Synergy
- 1. "Hanging Habagat" Released: October 19, 2010; 2. "Sa 'Yo Lang" Released: February 25, 2011; 3. "Sari-Saring Kwento" Released: July 8, 2011; 4. "Nightmares" Released: December 4, 2011

Synergy is Champ Lui Pio's debut album.

== Track listing and durations ==
No.	Title	Writer(s)	Length
1.	"Sparkplug"	Howard Espiritu	3:10
2.	"Hanging Habagat"	Champ Lui Pio	5:46
3.	"Sari-Saring Kwento (Feat. Gloc-9 and Noel Cabangon)"	Champ Lui Pio	3:37
4.	"Sa 'Yo Lang (Feat. Julianne Tarroja)"	Champ Lui Pio	4:25
5.	"Magdamag (Feat. Hilera)"	Howard Espiritu, Geronimo Saroca	3:35
6.	"Gulong (Feat. Parokya Ni Edgar)"	Champ Lui Pio	4:15
7.	"Nightmares (Feat. Sheldon Gellada on bass, Rolz Martinez on additional guitar, Omnie Saroca on drums and Paolo Santiago on additional percussion) "	Champ Lui Pio	5:07
8.	"Bleed"	Howard Espiritu	3:31
9.	"Emergency Room"	Howard Espiritu	3:15
10.	"Juan Tamad (Feat. Parokya Ni Edgar)"	Champ Lui Pio	4:05
