= Tala (song) =

- Official music video thumbnail

Single by Sarah Geronimo

from the album The Great Unknown
- Released: January 31, 2016
- Recorded: 2015
- Genre: Pop; dancehall
- Length: 4:05
- Label: Viva Records
- Songwriters: Emmanuel Sambayan; Nica del Rosario
- Producers: Emmanuel Sambayan; Bojam

Sarah Geronimo singles chronology
"Dulo" (2016)	"Tala" (2016)	"The Great Unknown" (2016)

Music video
- "Tala" on YouTube

"Tala" (transl. Star) is a song by Filipino singer and actress Sarah Geronimo. It was written by Nica del Rosario and Emmanuel Sambayan, with music and production by Jumbo De Belen and Alisson Shore of Flip Music Production. It was released as the lead single from Geronimo's platinum album The Great Unknown.

The single won “Song of the Year” at the 2017 Myx Music Awards. In 2018, Geronimo performed the song at the ASEAN-Japan Music Festival held in Tokyo. In 2019, CNN Philippines named the song as the Best OPM song of 2010s. A sleeper hit, "Tala" gained considerable popularity three years after its release in 2019. In 2020, the song have earned a total of almost two hundred million views.

== Live performances ==
Sarah Geronimo premiered Tala on her From the Top concert in December 2015. She also performed the song on various album mall tour for The Great Unknown in the Philippines. On ASAP stage, the popstar performed the hit four times. She also made an acoustic version of the song for her The Great Unknown Unplugged concert. It also became one of the highlights of her This 15 Me concert in Smart Araneta Coliseum. In 2018, Geronimo performed the song along with her other hit Kilometro at the ASEAN-Japan Music Festival. In 2023, the Popstar Royalty performed it and Dati-Dati at the FIBA World Cup Draw held in Manila.

== Music video ==
The music video shows Sarah Geronimo's sexier side as she shows off her Georcelle Dapat-Sy Choreographed dance moves along with the G-force while performing the song. It was directed by Paul Basinilio. The music video was premiered on Myx, and posted on Viva Records official YouTube channel on June 11, 2016. It reached the top of the Myx Hit Chart on the week of June 26. The video reached the 25 million mark on the first day of 2020. The music video claimed the title of most viewed OPM music video by a female solo act in March 2020 with over 100 million views, beating Yeng Constantino's Ikaw which had over 104 million views. It is also the most liked and most viewed OPM music video of all time with 158 million views, surpassing Buwan by Juan Karlos and Kung 'Di Rin Lang Ikaw by December Avenue and Moira Dela Torre.

== Notable covers ==
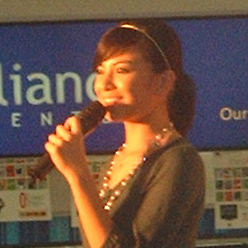
Glaiza de Castro

The song “Tala” has inspired numerous covers and performances across various platforms and by a wide range of artists. PBB Teen housemate Vivoree covered the song, while Encantadia star Glaiza de Castro, Donnalyn Bartolome, Diva Montelaba, and dance group The Addlib all released dance covers on YouTube. Ella Cruz also uploaded a dance cover and performed it live with Julian Trono at the 2017 MYX Music Awards. AC Bonifacio performed “Tala” several times, including a dance duet with The Voice winner Jason Dy. The song was performed live by the Filipina girl group After 5 on Wish FM Bus and was featured in Anne Curtis's concert AnneKulit: Promise, Last Na ’To! where she performed it alongside Sarah Geronimo herself. It was also impersonated on Your Face Sounds Familiar Kids in 2018 by Sheena Belarmino and again in 2021 by Vivoree. Internationally, South Korean boy band WINNER danced to the song during their Manila concert at the Mall of Asia Arena in January 2020, while K-pop girl group Purple Kiss included a short cover of it in their 2020 video “TOP Female Vocalists of Each Country,” highlighting Geronimo among global icons like Hwasa, Ariana Grande, and Adele. A cover version by Bryan Chong is promoted for the 2025 MMFF film, Call Me Mother.

== Media usage ==
- A version of the song with modified lyrics was used in a Jollibee advertisement featuring Anne Curtis.
- Award-winning Filipino magazine show Kapuso Mo, Jessica Soho used the song as the theme for its "Selos Sa Peryahan" feature.
- The song was used for the first lip-sync battle on Season 1 of the Philippines’ version of Rupaul’s Drag Race.

== Charts ==
Chart (2020)	Peak position
US World Digital Song Sales (Billboard)	12

== Awards ==
Year	Awards ceremony	Award	Results
2016	Parangal Paulinian	Awit (Song of the Year)	Won
2016	PMPC Star Awards for Music	Song of the Year	Nominated
2016	LionheartTV RAWR Awards	Song of the Year	Nominated
2016	Awit Awards	Song of the Year	Nominated
2017	Myx Music Awards	Favorite Song	Won
2017	Myx Music Awards	Favorite Music Video	Won
2020	Popnable WorldVision Music Contest	Best Song	Won
