= Kundiman (disambiguation) =

Kundiman is a genre of traditional Filipino love songs.

Kundiman may also refer to:

- Kundiman (nonprofit organization), a nonprofit organization focused on Asian American literature
- Kundiman (Hale album), a 2009 album by Hale
- "Kundiman" (BGYO song), a song by BGYO from the 2021 album The Light
- El Kundiman, a 1932 painting by Fabián de la Rosa
- Kundiman (Sylvia La Torre album), an album by Queen of Kundiman, Sylvia La Torre

== See also ==
- Kundmannia, a genus of flowering plant
