= Back from Beginning =

Back from Beginning may refer to:

- "B.F.B. = Back from Beginning", a 2021 episode of the web series Battle for Dream Island
- "Back from Beginning", a 2008 song by Hale from the album Above, Over and Beyond
