= Escueta =

Escueta is a surname. Notable people with the surname include:

- Mark Escueta (born 1976), Filipino musician
- Miguel Escueta (born 1984), Filipino male vocalist, singer, and performer
- Philip Joper Escueta (born 1993), Filipino badminton player
