= Duyan (song) =

2018 single by Sarah Geronimo

- 2022 YouTube Music exclusive extended version cover art

Single by Sarah Geronimo

from the album This 15 Me
- Released: April 6, 2018
- Recorded: 2018
- Genre: P-pop; Soul
- Length: 4:22 (Standard); 7:03 (Extended)
- Label: Viva Records
- Songwriters: Thyro Alfaro, Yumi Lacsamana
- Producer: Thyro Alfaro

Sarah Geronimo singles chronology
"Ganito" (2018)	"Duyan" (2018)	"Kiss Me, Kiss Me" (2018)

"Duyan" is a song recorded by Filipino singer-actress Sarah Geronimo, released in 2018 as a digital single under Viva Records. It is one of the tracks featured in her studio album This 15 Me, which commemorates her 15th year in the music industry. The song was written and produced by the Filipino songwriting duo Thyro Alfaro and Yumi Lacsamana. Unlike Geronimo's usual chart-topping pop anthems, “Duyan” is a minimalist ballad that leans into subtle vocal control and emotional storytelling. It topped Philippines iTunes songs chart immediately after release, dethroning another Geronimo song "Ganito."

== Background and composition ==
"Duyan" was written by the songwriting duo Thyro Alfaro and Yumi Lacsamana, who have frequently collaborated with Sarah Geronimo on projects celebrating her artistry evolution, including earlier hits like “Kilometro” and “Ikot‑Ikot." According to a Rappler feature, the duo describe "Duyan" as capturing the exhilarating heights of being in love, using the imagery of cradling to communicate intimacy and emotional safety.

Musically, the track is structured as a minimalist, lullaby‑inspired ballad, with delicate piano lines, soft ambient strings, and subtle percussion that all serve to spotlight Geronimo's singing. The restrained arrangement allows her to deliver a controlled and emotive vocal performance that prioritizes warmth and sincerity over vocal showmanship.

== Reception ==
The Pop Blog added the song to its list of "Sarah Geronimo songs people should listen to", describing it as "A soulful anthem that also takes its roots from Apo Hiking Society and other OPM bands from the 70s."

In 2022, after the premiere of a "Duyan" performance video on ASAP Natin ‘To, with the song's bridge sung in a single, sustained breath, the song went viral on TikTok, giving rise to the #OneBreathChallenge. Shortly after the performance aired, TikTok users began posting their own attempts at replicating the feat.

== Live performances ==
Geronimo performed “Duyan” during several legs of her This 15 Me concert series in 2018, including her concert at the Araneta Coliseum. In 2020, as part of her This 15 Me album promotion, she performed the song on ASAP Natin 'To. During the COVID-19 pandemic, Geronimo appeared on various online music events to perform the song, including Coca-Cola's "Peel Mo Panalo Promo" draw, and Lander's "Love Landers" anniversary event. At her 20th Anniversary concert, Geronimo honored her frequent collaborators, songwriters Thyro Alfaro, Yumi Lacsamana and Nica del Rosario by having them on stage to perform an extended version of the song.

== Music video ==
In July 2022, Viva Records released an official performance video of “Duyan” by Sarah Geronimo. The video featured a live rendition with choreography by Georcelle Dapat‑Sy and G‑Force, conceptualised by Geronimo, directed by Paolo Valenciano, under the creative direction of Dapat-Sy. Songwriter, Thyro Alfaro made a special appearance on the video. It premiered on ASAP Natin 'To, marking Geronimo's television comeback after hiatus and the launch of her own segment "Sarah G. Specials."

The performance video trended at #19 on YouTube's music charts in the Philippines and received over 200,000 views shortly after release.
