= The Great Unknown (song) =

Single by Sarah Geronimo featuring Hale

from the album The Great Unknown
- Released: September 2016
- Length: 5:35
- Label: Viva Records
- Songwriter: Roll Martinez

Sarah Geronimo singles chronology
"Tala" (2016)	"The Great Unknown" (2016)	"Kaibigan Mo" (2017)

Music video
- "The Great Unknown" on YouTube

"The Great Unknown" is a song written by Hale's Roll Martinez, and recorded by Filipino singer-actress Sarah Geronimo. It was released as the second single from Geronimo's platinum album of the same title. The song features the band Hale. The accompanying music video peaked at #1 on both Myx Philippines and MTV Pinoy charts. The song won "Favourite Collaboration" at the 2017 edition of Myx Music Awards.

== Music video ==
The music video was directed by Nolan Bernardino who directed Geronimo's previous music video for her song "Minamahal." It was premiered on MYX and MTV Pinoy on September 26, 2016. It was posted on Viva Records' official YouTube channel on the same day and as of March 2017, the music video was viewed 1,400,000 times. The music video was charted at #1 on MTV Pinoy 2016 Year-End countdown.

== Live Performances ==
Sarah Geronimo along with Hale first performed the song on ABS-CBN's Sunday concert-variety show ASAP on Oct 16, 2016. They also hit the It's Showtime stage to perform the song on Nov 4, 2016.

== Awards and nominations ==
Year	Award ceremony	Category	Result
2017	Myx Music Awards	Favorite Collaboration	Won
