= Somedaydream =

- Also known as: Rez Toledo
- Born: Rez Luigi Evia Toledo; 28 November 1990 (age 35)
- Origin: Manila, Philippines
- Genres: Pop, synthpop, P-pop
- Years active: 2011–present
- Labels: Mecca Records; Futurestudio; Logiclub; MCA Music
- Members: Rez Toledo
- Website: http://meccaph.com/

Somedaydream is a Filipino synthpop project created by singer/songwriter and music producer Rez Toledo in 2009 in Manila, Philippines. In 2011, it gained attention with the hit single "Hey Daydreamer".

== Biography ==
=== 2011–present: Somedaydream ===
Toledo started the project in 2009 at the age of 18 with only a synthesizer. After trying to produce some songs, he released three of his songs on the internet, which got positive feedback and encouraged him to keep making music. As a sophomore from Ateneo de Manila University, Somedaydream was discovered online by Champ Lui Pio, the frontman of the band Hale. Lui Pio then established the local music label Mecca Music and signed him as their first client.

In February 2011, Somedaydream gained mainstream popularity with his first single "Hey Daydreamer", which quickly topped the charts of local radio stations within the Greater Manila Area. His follow-up singles achieved similar success. Somedaydream's group of fans called themselves "Dreamers" and his official fan club is called "Dreamers Official". The single "Hey Daydreamer" was used in a Selecta Cornetto commercial. That same month, he was the front act for Avril Lavigne's The Black Star Tour.

In June 2011, Toledo was the celebrity VJ for Myx. On November 29, 2011, Somedaydream's self-titled debut album Somedaydream was released.

In March 2012, Somedaydream collaborated with Sarah Geronimo and Gary Valenciano for "Tuloy", a song now used as Coca-Cola's 100th Anniversary theme song in the Philippines. Also as part of the anniversary, Somedaydream, along with other artists, performed at the Coca-Cola Concert Ng Bayan, held on 23 March 2012 at the SM Mall of Asia Concert Grounds. Somedaydream performed "Tuloy" live during the concert with collaborators Sarah Geronimo and Gary Valenciano.

Following the success of his debut album, he took an extended hiatus. During this time, Toledo co-founded 2 independent brands: Futurestudio, a record label, and Logiclub, an artist/producer collective management outfit which included Curtismith. He later began collaborating with former General Luna vocalist Nicole Asensio in partnership with MCA Music and D5 Studio Originals. In 2017, he released his second album: HOLOGRAPHIC.

== Discography ==
=== Albums ===
- Somedaydream (2011)
- Holographic: Green Year (2017)

== Awards and nominations ==
Award	Category	Result
25th Awit Awards	ABS-CBN Interactive's Most Downloaded Artist for 2011	Won
Myx Music Awards 2012	Favorite Music Video for "Hey Daydreamer"	Nominated
Myx Music Awards 2012	Favorite Song for "Hey Daydreamer"	Nominated
Myx Music Awards 2012	Favorite Artist	Nominated
Myx Music Awards 2012	Favorite Male Artist	Nominated
Myx Music Awards 2012	Favorite New Artist	Nominated
Myx Music Awards 2012	Favorite Myx Celebrity VJ	Won
Yahoo OMG! Awards	Breakthrough Artist	Won
