= Duyan =

Duyan may refer to:

- Duyan (TV series), a 2006 Philippine television drama series
- Duyan (song), a 2018 song by Sarah Geronimo
