= Myx Music Awards 2017 =

Annual Philippine music awards ceremony

- Date: March 16, 2017
- Location: Kia Theater, Araneta Center, Cubao, Quezon City
- Country: Philippines
- Hosted by: Myx VJs

Highlights
- Most wins: Sarah Geronimo (3)
- Most nominations: Elmo Magalona (7)
- Website: www.myxph.com/myxmusicawards/

Television/radio coverage
- Network: Myx

Myx Music Awards 2017 was the 12th installment of the Myx Music Awards, acknowledging the biggest hit makers of 2016 in the Philippine music industry. For the sixth consecutive year, fans could vote online through the Myx website.

Nominees were announced on February 2, 2017 starting at 5pm via Facebook Live streaming. Leading the nominees was Elmo Magalona with seven nominations.

The awards night was held on March 16, 2017 at Kia Theater, Araneta Center, Cubao, Quezon City at 8:00PM (PST). It was telecast live on Myx channel on cable and via live streaming on their website, via Facebook live and YouTube live streaming.

== Winners and nominees ==
Winners are listed first and highlighted in boldface.

Myx Magna Award (special award)	Best Music Video (special award)
**Vicente "Vic" Del Rosario, Jr.**	**"Hoy" - Gloc-9 (Dir. Paul Basinillo)**; "Bolang Kristal" - Abra feat. KZ Tandingan (Dir. Joy Aquino); "Is It Hip?" - Apartel (Dir. Marie Jamora); "Liwanag" - Aicelle Santos (Dir. Jayson Bernard Santos); "The Great Unknown" - Sarah Geronimo feat. Hale (Dir. Nolan Bernardino)
Favorite Music Video	Favorite Song
**"Tala" - Sarah Geronimo (Dir. Paul Basinillo)**; "7 Minutes" - Darren Espanto (Dir. Ian Gaslim); "Alam Mo Ba" - Elmo Magalona and Janella Salvador (Dir. Miggy Tanchangco); "Naririning Mo Ba" - Julie Anne San Jose (Dir. Chris Librojo); "O Pag-ibig" - Bailey May and Ylona Garcia (Dir. Jasper Salimbangon with Mint College)	**"Tala" - Sarah Geronimo**; "7 Minutes" - Darren Espanto; "Kay Dali" - Elmo Magalona; "O Pag-ibig" - Bailey May and Ylona Garcia; "Randomantic" - James Reid
Favorite Artist	Favorite Group
**Darren Espanto**; Elmo Magalona; James Reid; Julie Anne San Jose; Sarah Geronimo	**The Juans**; Callalily; Gracenote; Silent Sanctuary; Sponge Cola
Favorite Male Artist	Favorite Female Artist
**Darren Espanto**; Alden Richards; Elmo Magalona; Gloc-9; James Reid	**Nadine Lustre**; Janella Salvador; Julie Anne San Jose; Sarah Geronimo; Yeng Constantino
Favorite New Artist	Favorite Mellow Video
**Ylona Garcia**; Iñigo Pascual; MilesExperience; Reese Lansangan; SUD	**"Di Ka Man Lang Nagpaalam" - Juan Karlos Labajo (Dir. Jiggy Gregorio)**; "Dating Tayo" - TJ Monterde (Dir. Patrick Jude Matanguihan); "Di Na Kita Mahal" - Silent Sanctuary (Dir. Ida Anita Del Mundo); "Ferris Wheel" - Yeng Constantino (Dir. Benedict Mariategue); "Wag Mong Aminin" - Rico Blanco (Dir. RA Rivera)
Favorite Urban Video	Favorite Rock Video
**"Hoy" - Gloc-9 (Dir. Paul Basinillo)**; "Bolang Kristal" -Abra feat. KZ (Dir. Joy Aquino); "Pasa Diyos" - Young JV feat. Vice Ganda (Dir. Will Harper); "Pilipinas" - Quest (Dir. Treb Monteras III); "The Deed" - Hi-C (Dir. Dice)	**"Videoke Queen" - Rico Blanco (Dir. RA Rivera)**; "Cheap Thrill" - Pupil (Dir. Erin Pascual); "Gising" - Autotelic (Dir. Paolo Ruiz); "Outlaw" - Sandwich (Dir. Rain Pengson); "You Can't Be Right" - Mayonnaise (Dir. The Right Frame Studios)
Favorite Collaboration	Favorite Remake
**"The Great Unknonwn" - Sarah Geronimo feat. Hale**; "Alam Mo Ba" - Elmo Magalona and Janella Salvador; "Bolang Kristal" - Abra feat. KZ; "Pariwara" - Ely Buendia & Itchyworms; "Throwback" - Morissette feat. KZ	**"Paraan" - Sharlene San Pedro**; "Baby I Love Your Way" - Morissette and Harana; "I'll Never Love This Way Again" - Jona; "Langit Na Rin" - JC De Vera; "Makita Kang Muli" - Ebe Dancel and Regine Velasquez-Alcasid
Favorite Media Soundtrack	Favorite Guest Appearance In A Music Video
**"This Time" - James Reid and Nadine Lustre**; "Born For You" - Elmo Magalona and Janella Salvador; "I'll Never Love This Wag Again" - Gary Valenciano; "Something I Need" - Piolo Pascual and Morissette; "Till I Met You" - Kyla	**Nash Aguas ("Pakipot Suplado" - Alexa Ilacad)**; Benjamin Alves ("Naririnig Mo Ba" - Julie Anne San Jose); Jairus Aquino & Sharlene San Pedro ("Ferris Wheel" - Yeng Constantino); Jessy Mendiola ("Langit Na Rin" - JC De Vera); Maja Salvador ("Hanggang Dito Na Lang" - Enchong Dee)
Favorite International Video	Favorite MYX Celebrity VJ
**"Closer" - The Chainsmokers feat. Halsey**; "History" - One Direction; "Jet Black Heart" - 5 Seconds of Summer; "Shout Out to My Ex" - Little Mix; "Work from Home" - Fifth Harmony feat. Ty Dolla $ign	**Elmo Magalona**; Andrea Brillantes; Bailey May & Ylona Garcia; Bela Padilla; Claudia Barretto; Hashtags; Inigo Pascual; JC De Vera; Miles Ocampo; Ronnie Alonte; Solenn Heussaff; Sue Ramirez

== Multiple awards ==
=== Artists with multiple wins ===
The following artists received two or more awards:

Wins	Artists
3	Sarah Geronimo
2	Darren Espanto
2	Gloc-9
2	Nadine Lustre

=== Artists with multiple nominations ===
The following artists received more than two nominations:

Nominations	Artists
7	Elmo Magalona
6	Sarah Geronimo
4	Darren Espanto
4	James Reid
4	Janella Salvador
4	Julie Anne San Jose
4	KZ Tandingan
4	Ylona Garcia
3	Abra
3	Bailey May
3	Gloc-9
3	JC De Vera
3	Morissette
3	Yeng Constantino
