= The Great Unknown (Sarah Geronimo album) =

Studio album by Sarah Geronimo
- Released: December 4, 2015
- Recorded: 2015
- Genres: Pop; R&B; dance
- Languages: English, Filipino
- Label: Viva Records
- Producers: Sarah Geronimo; Civ Fontanilla

Sarah Geronimo chronology
Perfectly Imperfect (2014)	The Great Unknown (2015)	This 15 Me (2018)

Singles from The Great Unknown
- 1. "Tala" Released: January 31, 2016; 2. "The Great Unknown" Released: September 24, 2016; 3. "Kaibigan Mo" Released: January 27, 2017; 4. "Misteryo" Released: April 9, 2017; 5. "Ako'y Para Lamang Sayo" Released: September 15, 2017

The Great Unknown is the twelfth studio album by Filipino singer Sarah Geronimo. It was released in the Philippines on December 4, 2015, through Viva Records and debuted at number two in Philippines iTunes pop music album chart behind Adele's 25. It was made available for purchase on December 4, 2015, despite releasing new tracks from previous album, Perfectly Imperfect.

== Background and development ==
On August 24, 2015, songwriter Yumi Lacsama posted a picture of her with Thyro and Sarah on her Instagram account. The picture showed all three them smiling with Thyro holding up a paper with what netizens thought as words written for a new song. Weeks after, Yumi posted another photo of Sarah in the recording studio. The album also features the songs of promising songwriters in the industry.

== Recording ==
In the album's line up songs, Geronimo collaborated with singer Yeng Constantino and rock band, Hale. Geronimo also worked once again with Yumi Lacsamana and Thyro Alfaro, who wrote the carrier singles of her previous albums such as "Ikot-Ikot" for Expressions album and "Kilometro" for Perfectly Imperfect.

== Singles ==
On December 4, 2015, Sarah teased her new album by performing the ninth track "Tala" (Star) in her concert From The Top and the song went viral in social media. It became the most streamed song in the album and it immediately ranked top spot in Pinoy Charts on Spotify Philippines. Viva Records released the lyric video on December 19, 2015, and Geronimo performed the carrier single on TV at the ASAP Live Stage on January 31, 2016. The music video premiered on June 10, 2016, at MYX & June 11 at MTV Pinoy. It peaked #1 on MYX Daily Top 10, Pinoy MYX Countdown, MTV Top 20 Pilipinas & MTV Today's Top 10. And also, "Tala" placed at Pinoy MYX Countdown and MYX Hit Chart Year-ender Countdown

"The Great Unknown" is the second single of this album released on September 24, 2016, and its music video premiered at MYX and at MTV Pinoy on September 26. "The Great Unknown" peaked 7 weeks at number one on Pinoy MYX Countdown & 30 days at number 1 on MYX Daily Top 10: Pinoy Edition. Also, the song peaked at number one on MTV Top 20 Pilipinas & MTV Today's Top 10. It placed first at MTV Top 20 Pilipinas 2016 Year-ender Countdown.

"Kaibigan Mo" is third single of the album release on January 27, 2017, performed live on 3rd Fusion Music Festival in SM Mall Of Asia Concert Grounds. The music video was set for release on February 3, 2017, premiere on MYX. It peaked #1 on MYX Daily Top 10:Pinoy Edition & Pinoy MYX Countdown

"Misteryo" is the fourth single of this album and music video premiere in MYX on April 9, 2017

"Ako'y Para Lamang Sayo" is fifth single of this album release on September 15, 2017

== Release ==
The Great Unknown is produced by Civ Fontanilla and Sarah Geronimo and is released by Viva Records. The album was released December 4 and is now available on iTunes for download worldwide and can be listened to on music services like Spotify, Deezer, Rdio and Guvera.

The lyric video for "Tala" (Stars) was uploaded on official YouTube channel of VIVA Records last December 18, 2015. VIVA Records also uploaded the lyric video for "Misteryo" (Mystery) last December 26, 2015.

== Critical reception ==
Rito P. Asilo of Inquirer.net wrote, "...the 10-track collection is a career-boosting showcase for the Popstar Princess’ ever-expanding skills as a vocalist, as well as her continually evolving interpretive ability as a performer...The 27-year-old singer-actress evinces growth and shines even when she isn't compelled to show off those steely pipes with attention-seeking birit notes.',

Ronald Constantino wrote in Tempo that "Sarah Geronimo continues with her amazing musical reinvention with the release of her twelfth and brand new album entitled “The Great Unknown,’’ and here, our musical Popstar Royalty takes the best bits from her two previous hit albums and expands on it further."

Journal.com praised Geronimo's choices of songwriters and wrote, "The Great Unknown is exclusively an all-original affair and Sarah meticulously picked the best songs from the most promising of songwriters."

== Promotion ==
The release of the album coincided with the singers' two night major concert in Araneta Coliseum, From The Top. To promote the album's release, Viva Records announced that Sarah G would be singing one of her new tracks in the concert. Geronimo would hold launch events at various shopping malls starting at Trinoma Mall on January 23, Glorietta Mall on February 6, Market! Market! on February 12, Harbor Point on April 9.

== Accolades ==
At the 38th Catholic Mass Media Awards, The Great Unknown won Best Secular Album. In December 2016, it also won the Album of the Year at the 29th Awit Awards. In May 2017, The Great Unknown earned Sarah the recognition as Female Recording Artist of the Year in 48th GMMSF Box Office Awards.

== Certification ==
- PHI:Platinum (15,000+ unit sold)

== Track listing ==
No.	Title	Writer(s)	Arranger(s)	Length
1.	"Unbroken"	Melvin Morallos	Morallos	3:27
2.	"The Great Unknown" (featuring Hale)	Roll Martinez	Martinez; Hale	5:41
3.	"Baby You're The Reason"	Geraldine Lim	Benjie Pating	3:32
4.	"Ako'y Para Lamang Sa 'Yo"	Totop Suzara	Teddy Katigbak	4:46
5.	"Kaibigan Mo" (featuring Yeng Constantino)	Yeng Constantino	Thyro Alfaro	4:10
6.	"Kapit"	Martinez	Martinez	4:01
7.	"Only For You"	Edmund Perlas; Gabby Wilson; Oscar Del Amor	Ian Fajarito	4:09
8.	"Sabi Mo Sa Akin"	Mark Villar	Gino Cruz	4:02
9.	"Tala"	Nica del Rosario; Emmanuel Sambayan; Sarah Geronimo	Del Rosario; Sambayan	4:05
10.	"Misteryo"	Alfaro; Yumi Lacsamana; Sarah Geronimo	Alfaro; Lacsamana	3:57

== Release history ==
Region	Date	Format(s)	Label	References
Philippines	December 4, 2015	Digital download	VIVA Records	
Worldwide	December 4, 2015	Digital download	VIVA Records	
Philippines	December 4, 2015	CD	VIVA Records	

== Charts and sales ==
Chart	Peak position	Reported sales
Philippines Odyssey Weekly Albums	1	Platinum

== Concert Tours ==
List of concerts, showing date, city, province, venue, and guests
Date	City	Province	Venue	Special Guests
November 29, 2016	Quezon City	Metro Manila	Kia Theatre	Hale; Hannah Flores
March 3, 2017	Davao City	Davao del Sur	SMX Convention Center Davao	Hale
May 19, 2017	Legazpi	Albay	Albay Astrodome	Hale; Julian Trono
June 30, 2017	San Fernando	Pampanga	LausGroup Event Centre	Hale; Julian Trono
August 25, 2017	Iloilo City	Iloilo	Iloilo Convention Center	
