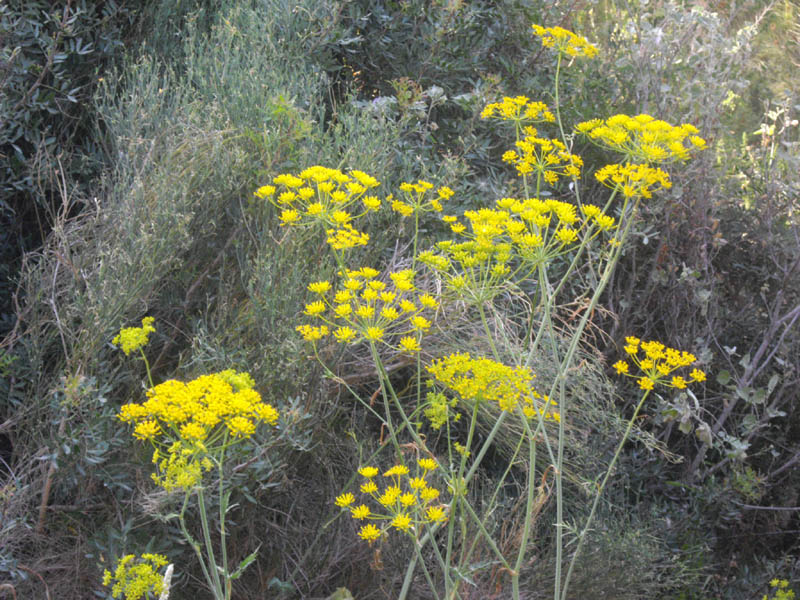

Scientific classification
- Kingdom: Plantae
- Clade: Tracheophytes
- Clade: Angiosperms
- Clade: Eudicots
- Clade: Asterids
- Order: Apiales
- Family: Apiaceae
- Genus: Kundmannia
- Species: K. sicula

Binomial name
- Kundmannia sicula (L.) DC.

Synonyms
- Sium siculum

= Kundmannia sicula =

Species of plant

Kundmannia sicula is a species of perennial herb in the family Apiaceae. They have a self-supporting growth form and have broad leaves. The plant is native to parts of Northern Africa and Southern Europe. It typically grows in garrigue and steppe environments.

== Sources ==
This article incorporates text from a free content work. Licensed under CC0 (license statement/permission). Text taken from Kundmannia sicula. Encyclopedia of Life.
