= Perfectly Imperfect (Sarah Geronimo album) =

Studio album by Sarah Geronimo
- Released: October 4, 2014
- Recorded: 2014
- Genres: Pop; contemporary R&B; dance
- Languages: English, Filipino
- Labels: Viva Records, XOXO Entertainment Corp.
- Producers: Sarah Geronimo; Vicente Del Rosario; Adam H.

Sarah Geronimo chronology
Expressions (2013)	Perfectly Imperfect (2014)	The Great Unknown (2015)

Singles from Perfectly Imperfect
- 1. "Kilometro" Released: September 17, 2014; 2. "Perfectly Imperfect" Released: April 15, 2015; 3. "Minamahal" Released: June 9, 2015; 4. "Dulo" Released: January 14, 2016

Perfectly Imperfect is the eleventh studio album by Filipino singer Sarah Geronimo and was released in the Philippines on October 4, 2014, by Viva Records.

== Background and development ==
On September 5, 2014, Viva Records announced on their Facebook page that Geronimo is set to release her eleventh studio album. They also hinted that the album will be released in America and other countries. It was later revealed on September 15 that in addition to Thyro & Yumi, Geronimo also worked with Canadian singer Elise Estrada and music producer Adam H. to write some of the songs in the album.

== Recording ==
For Perfectly Imperfect, Geronimo worked with local and international producers. Thyro Alfaro, who wrote the carrier singles on Expressions, worked alongside his music duo partner Yumi Lacsamana for the tracks "Kilometro" (Kilometer) and "Dulo" (Limit). The pair are known for being the winning composers at the second Philippine Popular Music Festival. They previously worked with Geronimo for the song titled "Dito Sa Maynila" (Here In Manila) which she performed at the Miss Manila Beauty Pageant on July 24, 2014. Canadian producer Adam H. accompanied Elise Estrada during her concert tour in the Philippines and was able to record the material they wrote for Geronimo in the studio on August 30.

== Singles ==
"Kilometro" (Kilometer) is the carrier single of the album and premiered on radio stations nationwide on September 17, 2014. It is described as a mid-tempo electro-house dance-pop and R&B song. It was written by Thyro Alfaro and Yumi Lacsamana. Viva Music uploaded the official lyric video of the song on their YouTube Channel on September 16, 2014. The official music video premiered at MTV Pinoy channel on November 26, 2014. In July 2015, Sarah Geronimo with her song Kilometro represented the Philippines in the 10th International Song Contest:The Global Sound hosted by Australian jury, as one of the 70 semi-finalists from different countries all over the world and later on advanced as one of the top 25 finalists. At the final round, it won the "Gold Global Sound" Award as the top recognition.

"Perfectly Imperfect" was announced as the second single and its official music video premiered on April 15, 2015. The song reached #1 on Myx Charts.

On June 2, 2015, Viva Music posted a poll on their Facebook page asking fans to choose between "Minamahal" and "Dulo" as the next single. They also posted official lyric videos for the songs in their YouTube page.

As of June 9, 2015, "Minamahal" can now be heard on the radio. It is considered as the third single from the album. The music video was released on November 20, 2015, uploaded in Viva Records YouTube Channel, five months after the songs radio release. The music video immediately went viral on Twitter.

Dulo, the seventh track in the album, became the last single to be released. The music video premiered on MTV Pinoy and uploaded on the record label's YouTube channel last January 14, 2016. In the music video, Sarah performed the song live, with video clips showcasing Sarah G's humble beginnings, to winning Star for a Night, her journey as a concert performer and behind the scene clips of her recent "From The Top" concert.

== Critical reception ==
The album has received generally favorable reviews. Baby Gil of Philippine Star called the album as "perfectly different" and praised Sarah by saying "It is nice to hear Sarah trying out new beats, experimenting with her ad-libs, testing her limits and getting away with the totally unexpected." Ricky Calderon of the same organization has praised Sarah for embracing the current pop sounds of today.

Malaya Philippines commended the album's vibrant new sound as she tackles different genres from pop to R&B to EDM.

Rito Asilo of Philippine Daily Inquirer described the tracks on the album as a blend of "career-reinventing dance tracks" and "gorgeously sung ballads" that would appeal to her followers.

Isah Red of Manila Standard Today noted Geronimo's transition to more upbeat music which can be seen through the tracks "Kilometro" (Kilometer) and "Bangon" (Rise). He also described the slow to mid-tempo ballads like "Kung Sabagay" (As A Matter Of Fact) and "Minamahal" (Loved) as tunes that could hold their own when compared to her past hits.

Punch Liwanag of Manila Bulletin stated that it is an album of vibrant changes and may influence the way Filipino music may sound. He quoted "The kicker in this album is the bubblegum-pop sounding title track and the piano-decked ballad “Bulletproof.” Canadian import producer Adam Hurstfield (Ne-Yo, Superjunior and Backstreet Boys) gave a Top 40 sheen to SG's sound that, unsurprisingly, fits the singer."

In 2015, Perfectly Imperfect album was hailed as the Best Secular Album at the 37th Catholic Mass Media Awards and the Album of the Year in the 28th Awit Awards.

== Promotion ==
To promote the album's release, Viva Records announced that Geronimo will hold launch events at various shopping malls on October 4 at Fairview Terraces, October 10 at Market Market, October 11 at Harbor Point, October 18 at Ayala Center Cebu, October 25 at Ayala Centrio Cagayan De Oro and October 31 at Marquee Mall.

== Awards and nominations ==
Perfectly Imperfect received six nominations at the Awit Awards 2015 and won, Album of the Year; plus four nominations at the PMPC Star Awards for Music. At the 37th Catholic Mass Media Awards, Perfectly Imperfect won Best Secular Album, while "In Your Hands" was nominated for Best Inspirational Song. Geronimo was given Record of the Year for "Kilometro" and Album of the Year at the CommExcel Student's Choice Award.

== Certification ==
- PHI: 2× Platinum (30,000+ units sold)

== Track listing ==
No.	Title	Writer(s)	Arranger(s)	Length
1.	"Perfectly Imperfect"	Adam Hurstfield	Hurstfield	3:35
2.	"Kilometro (Kilometer)"	Thyro Alfaro; Yumi Lacsamana	Alfaro	3:18
3.	"Minamahal (Loved)"	Gianina Camille Del Rosario	Julius James De Belen	3:52
4.	"Until Forever"	Agatha Obar-Morallos		3:43
5.	"This Fight"	Kito Romualdez		4:30
6.	"Bulletproof"	Hurstfield; Bryant Olender	Hurstfield	3:41
7.	"Dulo (End)"	Alfaro; Lacsamana	Alfaro	3:23
8.	"Bangon (Rise)"	Ricardo Jose Santillan	Belen	4:07
9.	"Kung Sa Bagay (As A Matter Of Fact)"	Agatha Obar-Morallos		4:02
10.	"In Your Hands"	Agatha Obar-Morallos		3:44
11.	"Last Night of Our Lives" (ft.CELEB)	Hurstfield; Estrada	Hurstfield	3:31

== Release history ==
Region	Date	Format(s)	Label	References
Philippines	October 8, 2014	Digital download	VIVA Records	
Worldwide	October 8, 2014	Digital download	VIVA Records	
Philippines	October 4, 2014	CD	VIVA Records	

== Charts and sales ==
Chart	Peak position	Reported sales
Philippines Odyssey Weekly Albums	1	Platinum
