= Julianne Tarroja =

Philippine musician

Julianne
- Born: Julie Anne Tarroja; February 1, 1983 (age 43); Baguio
- Occupation: Singer-songwriter
- Years active: 2005–present
- Website: http://www.juliannetarroja.com

Julie Anne Tarroja (born February 1, 1983), professionally billed as Julianne or Julianne Tarroja, is a Filipino singer. She released her first album, Grateful, in 2007. She won the awards for Best Performance by a Female Recording Artist (for "Tulak ng Bibig") and Best Performance by a New Female Recording Artist (for "Grateful") at the 21st Awit Awards in 2008. At the 27th Awit Awards in 2014, she shared the award for Best World Music Recording with Sitti for their recording of "Pansamantagal".

== Discography ==
=== Studio album ===
- Ashes To Beauty

1. Ashes To Beauty [Music & Lyrics by: Julianne Tarroja]
2. Buwan [Music & Lyrics by: Julianne Tarroja]
3. Fly [Music & Lyrics by: Julianne Tarroja]
4. Here And Now [Music & Lyrics by: Julianne Tarroja]
5. Ikaw Lang [Music & Lyrics by: Julianne Tarroja]
6. Melancholy Moon [Music by: Julianne Tarroja / Lyrics by: Jonmarc De Guzman & Julianne Tarroja]
7. 7000 Miles To Grow [Music by: Julianne Tarroja]
8. Never Far [Music by: Julianne Tarroja / Lyrics by: Jonmarc De Guzman & Julianne Tarroja]
9. One Step [Music & Lyrics by: Julianne Tarroja]

10. Warning Sign [Music & Lyrics by: Julianne Tarroja]

- Grateful

1. Tulak Ng Bibig [Music & Lyrics by: Julianne Tarroja]
2. Grateful [Music & Lyrics by: Julianne Tarroja]
3. Choose To Believe [Music & Lyrics by: Julianne Tarroja]
4. Queen In Me [Music & Lyrics by: Julianne Tarroja]
5. Let In Rain [Music & Lyrics by: Julianne Tarroja]
6. Unsaid [Music & Lyrics by: Julianne Tarroja]
7. Healing [Music by: Julianne Tarroja / Lyrics by: Jonmarc De Guzman & Julianne Tarroja]
8. Empty Chairs [Music by: Julianne Tarroja / Lyrics by: Carisse Escueta & Julianne Tarroja]
9.Thank You [Music by: Julianne Tarroja / Lyrics by: RJ Manese & Julianne Tarroja]

- Liwanag

1. Liwanag [Music & Lyrics by: Julianne Tarroja]

== Singles ==
- "Tulak ng Bibig" (2007)
- "Grateful" (2007)
- Queen In Me (2007)
- "This is Me" (feat. Miguel Escueta) (2008)
- "Liwanag" (2009)
- "Sa'yo Lang" (feat. Champ Lui Pio) (2010)
- "Fly" (2011)
- "Ikaw Lang" (2013)
- "Pansamantagal" (feat. Sitti Navarro) (2014)
- "Ashes to Beauty" (2016)
- "Never Far" (2016)

== Awards and nominations ==
| Year | Award giving body | Category | Nominated work | Results |
|---|---|---|---|---|
| 2008 | Awit Awards | Best Performance by a Female Recording Artist (Performance Award) | "Tulak ng Bibig" | Won |
| 2008 | Awit Awards | Best Performance by a New Female Recording Artist (Performance Award) | "Grateful" | Won |
| 2008 | Awit Awards | Song of the Year | "Tulak ng Bibig" | Nominated |
| 2008 | Awit Awards | Best World/Alternative/Bossa Music Recording | "Empty Chairs" | Nominated |
| 2008 | Awit Awards | Best Inspirational/Religious Recording | "Grateful" | Nominated |
| 2008 | Awit Awards | Best Jazz Recording | "Choose To Believe" | Nominated |
| 2008 | Awit Awards | Best Jazz Recording | "Empty Chairs" | Nominated |
| 2008 | Awit Awards | Best Musical Arrangement | "Grateful" | Nominated |
| 2008 | Awit Awards | Best Musical Arrangement | "Tulak ng Bibig" with Daniel Crisologo | Nominated |
| 2008 | Awit Awards | Best Performance by a Female Recording Artist (People's Choice Award) | "Tulak ng Bibig" | Nominated |
| 2008 | Awit Awards | Best Performance by a New Female Recording Artist (People's Choice Award) | "Grateful" | Nominated |
| 2008 | Awit Awards | Song of the Year (People's Choice Award) | "Tulak ng Bibig" | Nominated |
