= Somedaydream (album) =

Studio album by Somedaydream
- Released: November 27, 2011
- Genre: Synthpop, pop, alternative dance
- Length: 32:12
- Label: Mecca Music, MCA Music

Singles from Somedaydream
- 1. "Hey Daydreamer" Released: January 2011; 2. "Hey Daydreamer(Acoustic)" Released: June 1, 2011; 3. "Delivery Boys" Released: July 18, 2011; 4. "Christmas Is Purple" Released: November 9, 2011; 5. "Sing This Song (radio)" Released: February 8, 2012

Somedaydream is the self-titled debut studio album by Filipino musical project Somedaydream.

== Album launch ==
Its grand album launch took place on November 29, 2011 at Phi Bar, Metrowalk.

== Singles ==
The album's lead single, "Hey Daydreamer", reached no.1 on multiple radio stations. The song's music video featured actress Jasmine Curtis, and it was directed by Bianca King and Enzo Valdez. The song's music video was launched at Capone's last April 27, 2011 and it has already amassed over 1.3 million views on YouTube. An acoustic version of the song was released, which also became a single. The song achieved further popularity when it was featured on Selecta Cornetto commercials. "Delivery Boys" was released as the third single from the album. The single's music video was launched on September 2, 2011 and became his second consecutive number one song on Myx. "Christmas Is Purple" was released to radio stations on November 9, 2011 and is Somedaydream's Christmas single for 2011. "Sing This Song" was the fifth single and was released to radio stations on February 8, 2012. These have since become hits in majority of these stations.

== Track listing ==
All songs written and composed by Rez Toledo.

No.	Title	Length
1.	"Prelude"	4:33
2.	"Hey Daydreamer"	3:43
3.	"Do-do With You"	4:05
4.	"Delivery Boys"	5:08
5.	"Break"	6:38
6.	"Sing This Song"	4:10
7.	"Hey Daydreamer" (Acoustic)	3:49

Digital exclusive track†
No.	Title	Length
8.	"Christmas Is Purple"	3:56

† The track is not actually included on the disc but rather as a mobile digital download with the use of a code included in the album packaging.

== Personnel ==
- Rez Toledo, Andrea Bocobo (track 3) – vocals
- Nacho Cuyegkeng (track 5) – Electric guitars
- Pao (track 3), An Pantaleon and Monty Macalino (track 2) – acoustic guitar
- JR Jader of Runmanila (additional drums on track 4) – drums

=== Technical personnel ===
- Executive Production – Champ Lui Pio
- Production – Rez Toledo
- Co-production – Rez Toledo (track 6)
- Additional engineer – Angie Rozul
- Mixing – Angee Rozul (except for track 1)
- Mastering – Angee Rozul
- Art Direction and Graphic Design – Ramon Vizmonte
- Photography – Chiqui Okol
