= List of MYX number one music videos of 2016 =

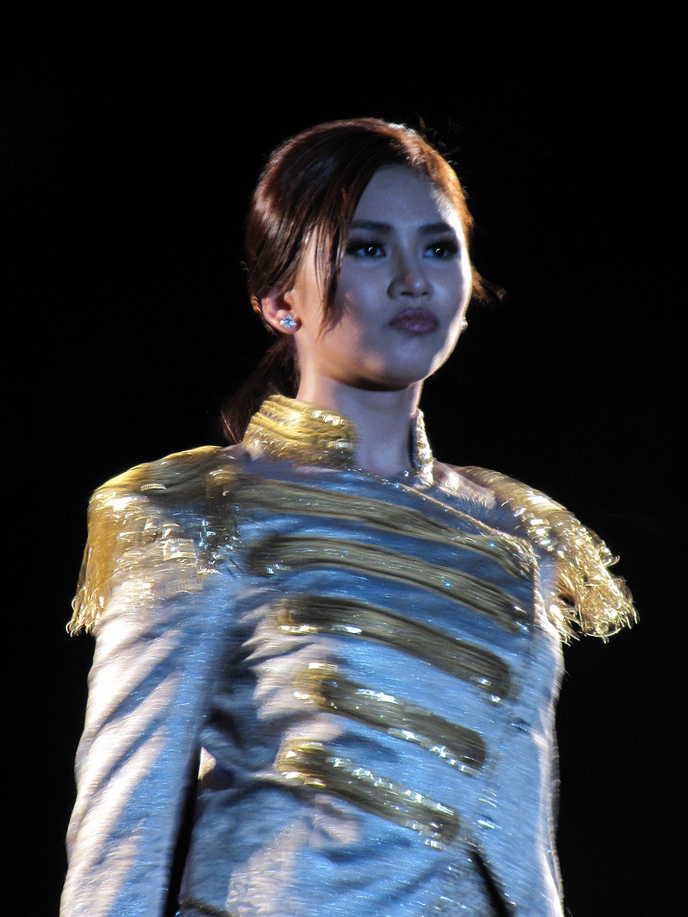
"Tala" by Sarah Geronimo (pictured) held the top spot for Myx Hit Chart Year-Ender 2016, after spending four weeks atop, making her first video to reach the milestone.

Myx is a music channel in the Philippines that shows different music videos, domestically and internationally. Every week, its MYX Hit Chart presents the Top 20 favorite music videos voted by People's choice.

In 2016, several acts topped the Myx Hit Chart and nineteen singles made at the summit. Singer Sarah Geronimo kicked off the year with "Minamahal" as it ran for a week and began its reign at the latter part of 2015. Some artists including Darren Espanto made the most number ones with 5. James Reid and Juan Karlos Labajo also gave multiple number ones, both have 2. On January 1 of 2017, Sarah Geronimo's "Tala" became the Myx Hit Chart's Number One Music Video of 2016.

== Chart history ==
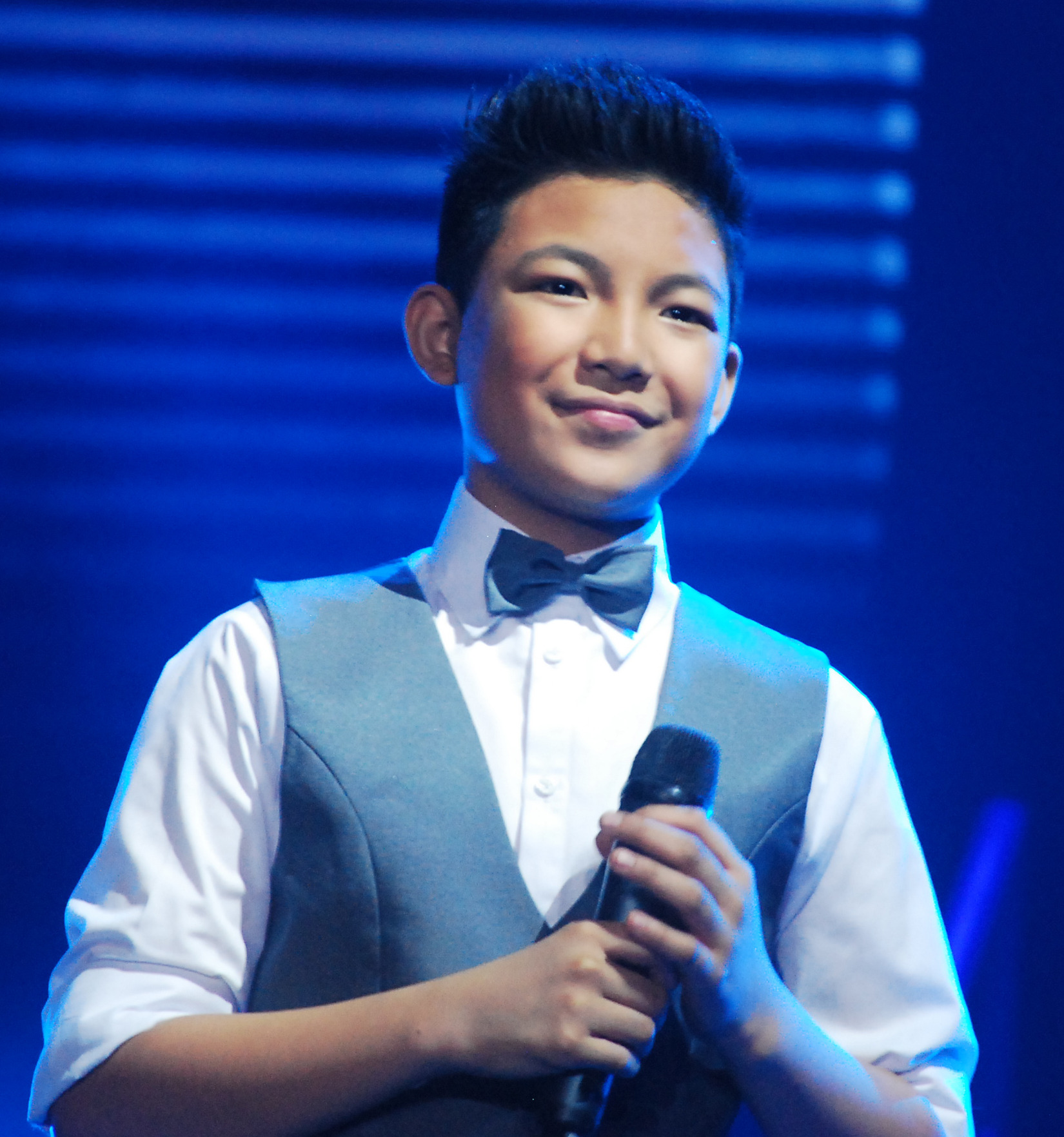
Darren Espanto (pictured) earned five number one music videos in 2016 with "Makin' Moves", "7 Minutes", "Starlight", "Parachute" and "Alam".

Key
†	Number One Music Video of 2016

Issue date	Music Video	Artist(s)
January 3	Minamahal	Sarah Geronimo
January 10	Makin' Moves	Darren Espanto
January 17	Makin' Moves	Darren Espanto
January 24	Makin' Moves	Darren Espanto
January 31	Makin' Moves	Darren Espanto
February 7	History	One Direction
February 14	History	One Direction
February 21	History	One Direction
February 28	Randomantic	James Reid
March 6	Randomantic	James Reid
March 13	Randomantic	James Reid
March 20	Randomantic	James Reid
March 27	'Di Ka Man Lang Nagpaalam	Juan Karlos Labajo
April 3	'Di Ka Man Lang Nagpaalam	Juan Karlos Labajo
April 10	'Di Ka Man Lang Nagpaalam	Juan Karlos Labajo
April 17	O Pag-ibig	Bailey May and Ylona Garcia
April 24	O Pag-ibig	Bailey May and Ylona Garcia
May 1	O Pag-ibig	Bailey May and Ylona Garcia
May 8	This Time	James Reid and Nadine Lustre
May 15	Summertime Love	Juan Karlos Labajo
May 22	Summertime Love	Juan Karlos Labajo
May 29	7 Minutes	Darren Espanto
June 5	7 Minutes	Darren Espanto
June 12	7 Minutes	Darren Espanto
June 19	7 Minutes	Darren Espanto
June 26	"Tala" †	Sarah Geronimo
July 3	"Tala" †	Sarah Geronimo
July 10	"Tala" †	Sarah Geronimo
July 17	"Tala" †	Sarah Geronimo
July 24	Starlight	Darren Espanto
July 31	Starlight	Darren Espanto
August 7	Starlight	Darren Espanto
August 14	Starlight	Darren Espanto
August 21	Naririnig Mo Ba?	Julie Anne San Jose
August 28	Naririnig Mo Ba?	Julie Anne San Jose
September 4	Naririnig Mo Ba?	Julie Anne San Jose
September 11	Parachute	Darren Espanto
September 18	Parachute	Darren Espanto
September 25	Closer	The Chainsmokers featuring Halsey
October 2	Closer	The Chainsmokers featuring Halsey
October 9	The Great Unknown	Sarah Geronimo featuring Hale
October 16	The Great Unknown	Sarah Geronimo featuring Hale
October 23	The Great Unknown	Sarah Geronimo featuring Hale
October 30	The Great Unknown	Sarah Geronimo featuring Hale
November 6	Shoutout To My Ex	Little Mix
November 13	Shoutout To My Ex	Little Mix
November 20	All Night	The Vamps featuring Matoma
November 27	All Night	The Vamps featuring Matoma
December 4	Alam	Darren Espanto
December 11	Alam	Darren Espanto
December 18	Alam Mo Ba	Elmo Magalona and Janella Salvador
December 25	Alam Mo Ba	Elmo Magalona and Janella Salvador

== Chart history of Myx International Top 20 ==
Key
†	Number One International Music Video of 2016

Issue date	Music Video	Artist(s)
January 2	Love Yourself	Justin Bieber
January 9	Jet Black Heart	5 Seconds of Summer
January 16	Jet Black Heart	5 Seconds of Summer
January 23	Jet Black Heart	5 Seconds of Summer
January 30	Jet Black Heart	5 Seconds of Summer
February 6	History	One Direction
February 13	History	One Direction
February 20	History	One Direction
February 27	History	One Direction
March 5	History	One Direction
March 12	History	One Direction
March 19	History	One Direction
March 26	Kung Fu Fighting	The Vamps
April 2	Kung Fu Fighting	The Vamps
April 9	Work From Home	Fifth Harmony featuring Ty Dolla Sign
April 16	Work From Home	Fifth Harmony featuring Ty Dolla Sign
April 23	Work From Home	Fifth Harmony featuring Ty Dolla Sign
April 30	Work From Home	Fifth Harmony featuring Ty Dolla Sign
May 7	Work From Home	Fifth Harmony featuring Ty Dolla Sign
May 14	Hair	Little Mix featuring Sean Paul
May 21	Hair	Little Mix featuring Sean Paul
May 27	Hair	Little Mix featuring Sean Paul
June 4	Hair	Little Mix featuring Sean Paul
June 11	Hair	Little Mix featuring Sean Paul
June 18	Into You	Ariana Grande
June 25	Write On Me	Fifth Harmony
July 2	Write On Me	Fifth Harmony
July 9	Flex (All In My Head)	Fifth Harmony featuring Fetty Wap
July 16	Flex (All In My Head)	Fifth Harmony featuring Fetty Wap
July 23	Flex (All In My Head)	Fifth Harmony featuring Fetty Wap
July 30	Flex (All In My Head)	Fifth Harmony featuring Fetty Wap
August 6	Girls Talk Boys	5 Seconds of Summer
August 13	Girls Talk Boys	5 Seconds of Summer
August 20	Rise	Katy Perry
August 27	Rise	Katy Perry
September 3	Make Me	Britney Spears featuring G-Eazy
September 10	Make Me	Britney Spears featuring G-Eazy
September 17	Make Me	Britney Spears featuring G-Eazy
September 24	"Closer" †	The Chainsmokers featuring Halsey
October 1	"Closer" †	The Chainsmokers featuring Halsey
October 8	Perfect Illusion	Lady Gaga
October 15	Perfect Illusion	Lady Gaga
October 22	Perfect Illusion	Lady Gaga
October 29	Perfect Illusion	Lady Gaga
November 5	Shoutout To My Ex	Little Mix
November 12	Shoutout To My Ex	Little Mix
November 20	All Night	The Vamps featuring Matoma
November 26	All Night	The Vamps featuring Matoma
December 3	All Night	The Vamps featuring Matoma
December 10	All Night	The Vamps featuring Matoma
December 17	All Night	The Vamps featuring Matoma
December 24	All Night	The Vamps featuring Matoma

== See also ==
- Myx Music Awards 2016
