= 3rd Avenue (Filipino band) =

- Origin: Manila, Philippines
- Genres: OPM, Pop Music
- Instruments: Various
- Years active: 2000 to present
- Label: Barnyard Music Philippines/Universal Records Philippines
- Members: Paolo Ledesma; Joy Fernandez; Princess Cabatu; Charmaine Villegas; Smith Javier; Migs Nuñez; Beng Gatmaitan; Lester Cerda; Tin Vargas; Shan Marasigan
- Website: www.3rdavenuemusic.com

3rd Avenue is a Filipino band composed of Paolo Ledesma (vocals), Joy Fernandez (vocals), Princess Cabatu (vocals), Charmaine Villegas (vocals), Smith Javier (vocals), Migs Nuñez (musical director, keyboards), Tin Vargas (bass), Shan Marasigan (guitars), Lester Cerda (saxophone and flute), and Beng Gatmaitan (drums).

This band started as an acoustic group of three members in 2000. The original members started performing at restaurants, bars and weddings. Although each one of them had different career backgrounds, they were bound together by their passion and enthusiasm for music.

The group embraced this bond and eventually added members to evolve into a 10-piece group. They released their first album, 3rd Avenue - In Time which was produced by Barnyard Music and distributed by Universal Records in 2007; and became the most sought after group in the Philippine wedding industry. Because of this, they are dubbed as "The Country's Premier Wedding Band".

== Discography ==
=== Albums ===
Nescafe De-Wired 2

- Released: 2004
- Producer: Vicor Music Philippines
- Tracks:
  - "Love Answers All"
  - "Seasons Of Love"

In Time

- Released: 2007
- Producer: Barnyard Music / RTI Music
- Tracks:
  1. "Aking Hiling"
  2. "Why Can’t It Be"
  3. "No Such Thing"
  4. "Hangga’t Tayo’y Magkasama"
  5. "Before It’s Too Late"
  6. "Iwas Lang"
  7. "In Time"
  8. "O, Kay Sarap"
  9. "I Don’t Know How To Say Goodbye"
  10. "What Would You Do?"
  11. "Paano Na Ang Puso?"
  - Bonus Track: "Aking Hiling" (Acoustic)
- Singles: "Aking Hiling" and "Why Can't It Be"

Mossimo Music: The Christmas Project (featuring 3rd Avenue, Barbie Almalbis, Rocksteddy, Dianne Elise, Jeffrey & Arnee Hidalgo, Urbanation and Luke Mejares)

- Released: 2007
- Producer: RTI Music
- Tracks:
  1. "The Christmas Song"
  2. "Winter Wonderland"

== Singles ==
- "Aking Hiling" from the album In Time (July 2007) theme song for QTV-11's Asianovela Sunrise and featured in GMA 7's Daisy Siete Season 16: Tabaching-ching
- "Why Can't It Be" from the album In Time (November 2007) OST for GMA Films' My Bestfriend's Girlfriend (BFGF), also featured in GMA 7's Maynila (2007)
- "Hangga't Tayo'y Magkasama" from the album In Time (April 2008) and featured in GMA 7's Daisy Siete Season 18: Prince Charming and the Seven Maids

== Other featured songs ==
- "O, Kay Sarap" - GMA 7's Daisy Siete Season 18: Prince Charming and the Seven Maids
- "Hangga't Tayo'y Magkasama" - GMA 7's Dear Friend (October 5, 2008, Episode)
- "Before It's Too Late" - GMA 7's Maynila (September 27, 2008, Episode)

== Awards and nominations ==
- 5x Top Booker at the Getting Married Bridal Fair Annual Awards

Year	Award giving body	Category	Nominated work	Results
2008	Awit Awards	Best Performance by a New Group Recording Artists (People's Choice Award)	"Why Can't It Be"	Won
2008	Awit Awards	Best Performance by a New Group Recording Artists (Performance Award)	"Why Can't It Be"	Nominated
