= Expressions (Sarah Geronimo album) =

Studio album by Sarah Geronimo
- Released: July 22, 2013
- Recorded: 2012–2013
- Genre: Pop; R&B
- Length: 45:40
- Language: Filipino, English
- Label: VIVA Records
- Producer: Sarah Geronimo; Vicente Del Rosario

Sarah Geronimo chronology
Pure OPM Classics (2012)	Expressions (2013)	Perfectly Imperfect (2014)

Singles from Expressions
- 1. "It Takes A Man And A Woman" Released: April 16, 2013; 2. "Ikot-Ikot" Released: July 22, 2013; 3. "Tayo" Released: November 17, 2013

Expressions is the tenth studio album by Filipino singer Sarah Geronimo, released in the Philippines on July 22, 2013, by Viva Records. The album's release marked Geronimo's 25th birthday and 10th anniversary in the entertainment industry. It consists of nine original songs and two covers and marks the beginning of her creative control.

== Background and development ==
In June 2013, Viva Records announced that she would be releasing her tenth studio album on July before her birthday. The album's title was later revealed to be Expressions, which will contain mainly original songs. On July 17, Viva Entertainment uploaded a video on their YouTube channel showing Geronimo in the studio recording "Pati Ang Pangarap Ko".

Geronimo was also actively involved in co-producing the record, from the conceptualization of the album to the selection of songs. She also wrote an inspirational Christian song, entitled "Make Me Yours", featuring the music of Louie Ocampo.

Upon the album's release, Viva Entertainment uploaded another two videos showing Geronimo recording the song "Tayo" in the studio with composers Thyro Alfaro and Pow Chavez.

== Singles ==
"Ikot-Ikot" was released as the album's lead single and was sent to various radio stations across Metro Manila on July 12, 2013. It became available for digital download on July 22 along with the album's release. For the music video of the single, Geronimo co-directed and worked with choreographer Georcelle Dapat-Sy. An exclusive interview and behind-the-scenes footage was released on October 18 by Viva Music. The official music video eventually premiered on their YouTube channel on October 20.

"Tayo" was released as the album's second single on November 17, 2013. It was announced as a single when Geronimo performed the song on ABS-CBN variety show ASAP on its release date. The music video premiered on December 21 on MYX.

== Promotion ==
To promote the album's release, Geronimo held launch events at various shopping malls across Quezon City from August 3. On August 4, she made an appearance on the ABS-CBN variety show ASAP to perform "Ikot-Ikot".

== Critical reception ==
Rito P. Asilo of the Philippine Daily Inquirer praised Geronimo's musical growth and artistry by producing the album and debuting as a songwriter in this record.

== Commercial performance ==
Ahead of its release, the album topped the iTunes Philippine charts due to pre-orders. It again went to number one following its release. The album also went to number one in Odyssey's album sales. After three months of its release, the album was certified platinum despite no music video release, late arrival in some music stores and also amid the release of her tickets for her Perfect 10 concert series, which happened in Smart Araneta Coliseum, Mall of Asia Arena, and Waterfront Cebu City Hotel. The award was officially given to Geronimo in the noontime variety show ASAP in November 2013.

== Track listing ==
No.	Title	Writer(s)	Producer(s)	Length
1.	"Again"	Vehnee Saturno; Popsie Saturno-San Pedro	Vehnee Saturno	4:21
2.	"Pati Ang Pangarap Ko"	Tito Cayamanda	Cayamanda	4:27
3.	"Ikot-Ikot"	Thyro Alfaro	Jumbo "Bojam" de Belen	3:52
4.	"Tayo"	Alfaro	RB "Kidwolf" Barbaso	3:33
5.	"Maaari Ba"	Pow Chavez	Jumbo "Bojam" de Belen	3:33
6.	"Eyes on Fire"	Franco Eumir Tantay	Civ Fontanilla	4:05
7.	"Sweetest Mistake"	Tantay	Fontanilla	5:16
8.	"Mama"	Pow Chavez	RB "Kidwolf" Barbaso	3:53
9.	"You've Got a Friend" (feat. Daddy Delfin Geronimo)	Carole King	Fontanilla	4:53
10.	"Make Me Yours"	Sarah Geronimo; Louie Ocampo	Ocampo	3:58
11.	"It Takes a Man and a Woman"	Denny Randell; Letty Jo Randell	Jonathan Manalo	3:49
Total length:				45:40

== Charts and sales ==
Chart	Peak position	Reported sales	
Philippines Odyssey Weekly Albums	1	Platinum	–
