= Sinosikat? =

Filipino band

- Origin: Manila, Philippines
- Genres: OPM, soul, jazz, funk
- Years active: 2004–present
- Label: Warner Music Philippines
- Members: Kat Agarrado; Nick Azarcon; Reli De Vera; Philippe Arreola; David Starck
- Website: http://www.sinosikat.com/home.html

SinoSikat? is a Filipino band that started September 2004, performing music influenced by a number of musical genres, but which has been described as "Filipino soul", reflecting an expansion of genres active within the Philippine music industry during the mid-2000s. The band released its eponymous first album in 2007, receiving media attention and critical acclaim when vocalist Kat Agarrado won Vocalist of the Year at the NU107 Rock Awards. The band has been named as a nominee for the People's Choice Award at the 2008 Awit Awards.

== Band members ==
Sinosikat?'s band members are Kat Agarrado on vocals, Nick Azarcon on guitars, Reli De Vera on drums, Noel Asistores on bass, and David Starck on keyboards. Sinosikat? sessionists and collaborators include keyboardist Nikki Cabardo, and bassists Berns Cuevas, Rommel dela Cruz, and Karel Honasan.

=== Kat Agarrado ===
Vocalist Kat Agarrado began singing professionally at age 17, making the rounds of Manila's music competitions. She later became vocalist for bands Kindred Garden, and Passage and occasionally did session work with Pinoy Rock icon Wally Gonzales. This early exposure led to her exploration of a wide range of musical styles, from hip-hop, RnB, jazz, standards, blues, classic rock, to electronic music. It was an interest in developing her voice further that led her to form SinoSikat?, which offers her greater creative freedom in exploring her vocal range.

=== Reli de Vera ===
Drummer Reli de Vera picked up his drumsticks early, acquiring a passion for music from his father, a bass player. His earliest influences included the Doobie Brothers, Grand Funk Railroad, the Beatles, and Deep Purple. After majoring in Painting for his college degree in Fine Arts at the University of Santo Tomas, he served as a sessionist for a wide range of artists that included Paolo Santos, Sing India, Nityalila, Spy, Pinikpikan, and P.O.T.

=== Nick Azarcon ===
Guitar man Nick Azarcon started playing the guitar at the age of 12, influenced by bands that included U2, Echo and the Bunnymen, the Police, and the Cult, and later Rage Against the Machine, Jeff Buckley, Weather Report, Richie Kotzen, and Chet Baker. Azarcon says joining SinoSikat? right after he graduated Architecture at UP Diliman proved a challenge for him due to the band's consistently genre-crossing repertoire.

=== Noel Asistores ===
Noel Asistores has been has been active in the session music circuit the late 1990s; a graduate of the University of the Philippines Diliman with a diploma in Creative Performance in Music and Arts (DCPMA), major in Classical Guitar, he has played artists such as Mon David, pianist Henry Katindig, Jeanine Desiderio, the group Radio Active Sago Project, Gabby Concepcion. Noel is very proficient in different musical styles, able to play rock, jazz, pop, and afro/Cuban music. Noel contributes to Sinsoikat and contributes to the rhythm section

=== David Starck ===
David is a renowned musician who was formerly based in New York. Born and raised in Paris, he studied Counterpoint at Scola Cantorum and enrolled at CIM, Centre International de Musique, Paris. He earned numerous awards such as First place at UFAM Union des Femmes Artistes Musiciennes of Paris and First place at Leopold Bellan. Apart from his passion in playing the piano he finished his specialized training in Audio Recording at the Pyramind School of Music, San Francisco. He performed, collaborated, and worked with a lot of prestigious artists from Paris, L.A. San Francisco, New York and Manila. Some of them were Joel Rosenblatt of Spyro Gyra, Manolo Badrena of Weather Report, Lew Soloff of Blood Sweat and Tears, Adam Nussbaum, Manero of the Gyspy Kings, Tots Tolentino, Flora Purim and Airto Moreira.

When he moved to New York in 1998, he took the opportunity to further enhance his career and his skills. He immersed himself with further studies on jazz harmony and theory with top artists such as Michael Weiss, Ed Simon, Joanne Brackeen, Mark Levine and Rebeca Mauleon. David has been intensely studying and has been doing numerous performances for more than 15 years. Still, he continues to further broaden his musical understanding.

== “Pinoy soul” ==
The band's label, Warner Music Philippines, has described Sinosikat?'s sound as "Pinoy soul", a label which the band agrees with.

== Discography ==
=== Studio albums ===
- Sinosikat? (eponymous) (2007, Warner Music Philippines)
1. "Akin Ka"
2. "So Blue"
3. "Praning"
4. "Telepono"
5. "Pag-ibig"
6. "Magic"
7. "Tragic Beauty"
8. "Prayer"
9. "Turning My Safety Off"
10. "Sino?"
- 2nd Album (2009, Warner Music Philippines)
1. "Toilet"
2. "Look At me"
3. "Patiently"
4. "Sa Ngalan Ng Pag-ibig Mo"
5. "Mr. Musikero (Pwede ba?)"
6. "Acid Funk"
7. "Heart Break Blues"
8. "H.S Romance"
9. "I'll Never Say..."
10. "Wherever You Are"
11. "Nung Iniwan Mo Ako"

== Awards and nominations ==
Year	Award giving body	Category	Nominated work	Results
2007	NU Rock Awards	Vocalist of the Year	(for Kat Agarrado)	Won
2007	NU Rock Awards	Best New Artist	—N/a	Nominated
2007	NU Rock Awards	Song of the Year	"Turning My Safety Off"	Nominated
2008	Awit Awards	Best World/Alternative/Bossa Music Recording	"Turning My Safety Off"	Won
2008	Awit Awards	Best Jazz Recording	"Akin Ka"	Won
2008	Awit Awards	Best Performance by a Group Recording Artists (People's Choice Award)	"So Blue"	Won
2008	Awit Awards	Best Performance by a Group Recording Artists (Performance Award)	"So Blue"	Nominated
2008	Awit Awards	Best Performance by a New Group Recording Artists (Performance Award)	"Magic"	Nominated
2008	Awit Awards	Best Jazz Recording	"Magic"	Nominated
2008	Awit Awards	Best Performance by a New Group Recording Artists (People's Choice Award)	"Magic"	Nominated
2008	Awit Awards	Song of the Year	"So Blue"	Nominated
2008	Awit Awards	Song of the Year (People's Choice Award)	"So Blue"	Nominated
2010	NU Rock Awards	Vocalist of the Year	(for Kat Agarrado)	Nominated
