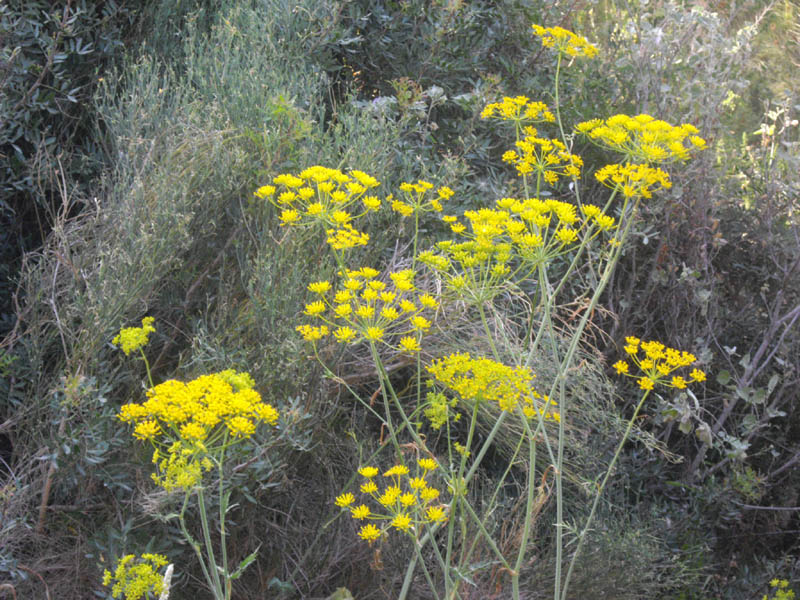
- Kundmannia sicula

Scientific classification
- Kingdom: Plantae
- Clade: Tracheophytes
- Clade: Angiosperms
- Clade: Eudicots
- Clade: Asterids
- Order: Apiales
- Family: Apiaceae
- Genus: Kundmannia; Scop.

Synonyms
- Arduina Adans.; Brignolia Bertol.; Campderia Lag.; Darion Raf.

= Kundmannia =

Genus of plants

Kundmannia is a genus of flowering plants belonging to the family Apiaceae.

Its native range is the Mediterranean. It is found in Algeria, the Balearic Islands, Corsica, Greece, Italy, Crete, Morocco, Portugal, Sardinia, Sicily, Spain, Tunisia and Turkey.

The genus name of Kundmannia is in honour of Johann Christian Kundmann (1684–1751), a German doctor from Wrocław with a large naturalist collection. It was first described and published in Intr. Hist. Nat. on page 116 in 1777.

Known species, according to Kew:

- Kundmannia anatolica Hub.-Mor.
- Kundmannia sicula (L.) DC.
- Kundmannia syriaca Boiss.
