= Kilometro (song) =

Single by Sarah Geronimo

from the album Perfectly Imperfect
- Released: September 17, 2014
- Recorded: 2014
- Genre: Pop; EDM; P-pop
- Length: 3:18
- Label: Viva Records
- Songwriters: Thyro Alfaro; Yumi Lacsamana
- Producer: Thyro Alfaro

Sarah Geronimo singles chronology
"Tayo" (2013)	"Kilometro" (2014)	"Perfectly Imperfect" (2015)

Music video
- "Kilometro" on YouTube

Kilometro (English: Kilometer) is a hit song by Filipino singer-actress Sarah Geronimo. It is the carrier single of her eleventh studio album Perfectly Imperfect. The song was written by Thyro Alfaro and Yumi Lacsamana and premiered on radio stations nationwide on September 17, 2014.

It earned critical acclaim and chart success, most notably achieving "Gold Global Sound" at the 10th International Song Contest: The Global Sound in Australia, making it the first Asian entry to win. In the Philippines, the song dominated airwaves and felt its impact in award circuits, earning Sarah a nomination for Best Performance by a Female Recording Artist at the 28th Awit Awards and helping Perfectly Imperfect win Album of the Year. It is widely recognized as one of the most significant songs in the evolution of modern P-pop, having been covered by acts such as BGYO, Alamat, and YGIG.

== Background and release ==
The music video was directed by Paul Basinillo. It premiered on MTV Pinoy channel on November 26, 2014. It also premiered on the official YouTube channel of VIVA on November 27, 2014.

== Cover versions ==
=== Studio versions ===
- Filipino-American boy band The Filharmonic recorded an a cappella version of the song for their album MotownFillie, released in 2015.
- Pop-rock band This Band recorded a rock version of the song for Coke Studio Season 3, released in 2019.

=== Singing competitions ===
"Kilometro" has become a popular choice in numerous singing competitions in the Philippines. Tawag ng Tanghalan Grand Finalist and 2nd placer Sam Mangubat performed the song during "Ang Huling Tapatan Day 4." In April 2017, Your Face Sounds Familiar Kids contestant AC Bonifacio chose to emulate Sarah Geronimo and delivered a powerful performance of "Kilometro" in the show's grand finals. The song was also covered by Ryssi Avila on Idol Philippines Season 2 (2022), and by Nikole Kyle Bernido on Tawag ng Tanghalan 2021 during Day 2 of Ang Huling Tapatan. In The Voice Kids Philippines 2023, Giuliana Chiong performed "Kilometro" during the Blind Auditions. On December 7, 2024, The Clash 2024 contestant Chloe Redondo showcased her vocal prowess by singing both "Ikot-Ikot" and "Kilometro." The song was also featured in duet and solo performances on Tawag ng Tanghalan, such as the 2023 duet by Shanne Gulle and Wincel Portugal and a solo performance by Ainah Apple Fonacier. Additionally, "Kilometro" was sung by Janette Mamino during her A-Sing-Tado performance on Sing Galing in 2022 and by Joseph Billeza during a Random-I-Sing segment in 2021. These performances reflect the song's enduring appeal and its status as a vocal showcase in the Filipino music competition scene.

=== P-pop covers & performances ===
The pop hit has become a favorite among P-pop acts, with numerous groups and artists performing their own renditions of the hit song. Before their official debut in 2020, the multilingual boy group Alamat released covers of both "Kilometro" and "Tala" during their pre-debut phase. In April 2021, BGYO showcased their version of the song on ASAP Natin 'To, alongside a performance of "Tala." In 2025, rising girl group RAYA released a performance video of "Kilometro," adding a fresh take to the song's legacy. During the 2024 SBTown Year-End Concert, YGIG included "Kilometro" in their setlist. Back in 2018, BoybandPH also sang their rendition of the song, highlighting its early popularity among male vocal groups. At the 8th PPOP Awards in 2023, 6ENSE performed a powerful cover of "Kilometro," while Darren Espanto delivered his own version on ASAP Natin 'To that same year. These performances underscore the song's ongoing influence across generations of Filipino pop performers.

=== Other notable covers ===
The Voice Kids contenders finalists Lyca Gairanod and Darlene Vibares performed the song on It's Showtime on May 14, 2015. Jason Dy, a Team Sarah alumnus and The Voice of the Philippines Season 2 winner, sang "Kilometro" on Kris TV in October 2015. The Filipino band The Juans also delivered their own rendition during a live performance on the Wish 107.5 FM Bus. In January 2016, the American Children's Choir Chicago Men and DiMension Chicago Children's Choir selected "Kilometro" for their performance at the World Music Festival in Chicago, highlighting the song's international reach and appeal. In June 2025, rising star Fyang Smith performed "Kilometro" during her Forever Fyang album launch, drawing significant attention on social media.

== Release history ==
Sarah Geronimo performing in her Concert at Monaco, November 22, 2008.

The song premiered on different radio stations across the Philippines on September 17, 2014. Upon its release, it topped the MYX Chart for several weeks.

== Personnel ==
- Sarah Geronimo – vocals
- Thyro Alfaro – songwriter, producer
- Yumi Lacsamana – songwriter
- Viva Records – label

== Media usage ==
- The melody of this song was used in a Jollibee commercial performing together with Anne Curtis.
- The song was featured in Spotify's 2019 Decade Wrapped campaign, underscoring its cultural impact and significance throughout the decade.
- A five-second snippet of the song was used in Todd Field's 2022 film, Tár.

== Awards and recognition ==
Year	Award	Category	Result
2015	International Song Contest: The Global Sound	Gold Global Sound	Won
2015	Awit Awards	Best Performance by a Female Recording Artist	Nominated
2015	PMPC Star Awards for Music	Song of the Year	Nominated
