= Hale (album) =

Studio album by Hale
- Released: April 2005; March 2, 2006 (re-released)
- Recorded: 2004
- Genres: Alternative rock; power pop; Pinoy rock
- Length: 55:02 (Original Edition); 1:04:21 (Special Edition)
- Label: EMI Philippines
- Producers: Russell Estaquio; Kiko Guevarra

Hale chronology
Hale (2005)	Twilight (2006)

Alternative cover
- Special Edition cover

Singles from Hale
- 1. "Broken Sonnet" Released: February 17, 2005; 2. "The Day You Said Goodnight" Released: June 1, 2005; 3. "Kahit Pa" Released: September 22, 2005; 4. "Kung Wala Ka" Released: December 16, 2005; 5. "Toll Gate" Released: February 8, 2006; 6. "Blue Sky" Released: April 17, 2006

Professional ratings
Review scores
Source	Rating
titikpilipino.com	4/5 stars

Hale is the debut studio album by Filipino rock band Hale, released in April 2005 under EMI Philippines.

The carrier single Broken Sonnet, was also featured on the compilation album FULL VOLUME, The best of Pinoy Alternative. the award-winning and well-received The Day You Said Goodnight, Kahit Pa, Kung Wala Ka and Blue Sky, together with Tollgate which can be found in Hale (Special Edition). The album was certified Double Platinum in November 2005. and was certified Triple Platinum (90,000 copies sold) in May 2006.

== Track listing and durations ==
No.	Title	Writer(s)	Length
1.	"Take No"	Hale	3:56
2.	"Broken Sonnet"	Hale	5:07
3.	"Blue Sky"	Hale	4:46
4.	"The Day You Said Goodnight"	Hale	4:51
5.	"Wishing"	Espiritu	4:47
6.	"Here Tonight"	Hale	5:51
7.	"Kahit Pa"	Hale	3:56
8.	"Life Support"	Hale	4:34
9.	"Underneath the Waves"	Hale	4:41
10.	"Runaway"	Hale	4:27
11.	"Bent Down"	Hale	4:04
12.	"Kung Wala Ka"	Hale	4:02

=== Special Edition ===
- Original album ends here. The repackaged album, Hale (Special Edition) contains an additional AVCD consisting of 4 music videos and 2 bonus tracks.

Bonus AVCD
No.	Title	Writer(s)	Length
1.	"Kung Wala Ka" (Music Video)
2.	"Kahit Pa" (Music Video)
3.	"The Day You Said Goodnight" (Music Video)
4.	"Broken Sonnet" (Music Video)
5.	"Toll Gate"	Hale	3:53
6.	"The Day You Said Goodnight" (Acoustic Version)	Hale	5:26

== Personnel ==
- All songs written and performed by Hale
- Executive Producer: Christopher Sy
- Produced by Russell Eustaguio & Kiko Guevarra
- Label Manager: Ethel Cachapero
- Business Analyst: Adrian Del R. Alfonso
- All instruments recorded by Angee Rozul at Tracks Recording Studio
- Vocals recorded by Darwin Concepcion at Freq. Studio
- Mixed and mastered by Ferdie Marquez at Freq. Studio
- Sleeve Design Supervision: Willie A. Monzon
- Sleeve Graphi Design, Art Direction and Photography by Eric David, Wreckless Eric Studios, San Francisco
- Band Color Portrait: Wawi Navarroza
- Hand Lettering: Jack Ruaro
- Electronic File Production: Artworks Graphic Design Inc.
- All songs co-published by EMI Philippines, Inc. and Nonoy Tan
