= Twilight (Hale album) =

Studio album by Hale
- Released: September 30, 2006
- Genres: Alternative rock, power pop, Pinoy rock
- Length: 1:01:05
- Label: EMI Philippines
- Producers: Francis Guevarra, Russell Estaquio

Hale chronology
Hale (2005)	Twilight (2006)	Above, Over and Beyond (2008)

Singles from Twilight
- 1. "Waltz" Released: October 7, 2006; 2. "Hide and Seek" Released: December 19, 2006; 3. "Shooting Star" Released: March 15, 2007; 4. "The Ballad Of" Released: August 22, 2007

Professional ratings
Review scores
Source	Rating
titikpilipino.com	3.5/5 stars

Twilight is the second studio album by Filipino rock band Hale, released under EMI Philippines on September 30, 2006. It contains four singles, which are the widely nominated "Waltz", "Hide and Seek", "Shooting Star" and "The Ballad Of". It was certified Gold (15, 000 copies sold) in October 2006 simultaneous to the release of "Waltz" and just a week before its release.

The album consists of musical arrangements of a wider spectrum and very much reflects the band's massive success thanks to their certified Triple Platinum self-titled debut album, Hale.

== Track listing ==
No.	Title	Writer(s)	Length
1.	"Last Song"	Lui Pio, Martinez	2:49
2.	"Fire in the Sky"	Lui Pio, Martinez, Gellada, Saroca	4:02
3.	"Empty Tears, Empty Heart"	Martinez	4:46
4.	"The Ballad Of"	Martinez	5:09
5.	"Waltz"	Gellada, Martinez	4:11
6.	"Hide and Seek"	Martinez, Gellada, Saroca	5:18
7.	"Eyes Wide Shut"	Lui Pio, Martinez, Gellada, Saroca	3:51
8.	"Liham"	Lui Pio	4:14
9.	"Shooting Star"	Lui Pio, Martinez	4:11
10.	"7, 8"	Lui Pio, Martinez, Gellada, Saroca	5:16
11.	"Elegy"	Martinez	4:04
12.	"Dahil Sa'Yo sa Himig ng Aking Gitara"	Martinez	3:33
13.	"Starting Over"	Martinez	4:26
14.	"Brother"	Hale	5:17
