= Kundiman (Hale album) =

Studio album by Hale
- Released: July 27, 2009
- Genre: Alternative rock, power pop, Pinoy rock
- Length: 38:30
- Label: PolyEast Records

Hale chronology
Above, Over and Beyond (2008)	Kundiman (2009)

Singles from Kundiman
- 1. "Bahay Kubo" Released: June 27, 2009; 2. "Kalesa" Released: November 24, 2009; 3. "Harinawa" Released: April 3, 2010; 4. "Magkaibang Mundo" Released: July 11, 2010

Professional ratings
Review scores
Source	Rating
isangpanata.wordpress.com	4/5 stars

Kundiman is the fourth studio album by Filipino rock band Hale, released on July 27, 2009, featuring their new drummer and new members of this band, Paolo Santiago, with singles "Bahay Kubo", "Kalesa", "Harinawa" and "Magkaibang Mundo".

The concept of Kundiman is Filipiniana as all songs of the album were written through cultural observation of the band's country of origin, and that the songs were also composed in humane context.

== Track listing ==
No.	Title	Writer(s)	Length
1.	"Bahay Kubo"	Lui Pio	4:52
2.	"Kalesa"	Lui Pio	4:07
3.	"Aso't Pusa"	Lui Pio	4:43
4.	"Ulap"	Lui Pio	4:16
5.	"Magkaibang Mundo"	Lui Pio	4:17
6.	"Bulalakaw"	Lui Pio	5:02
7.	"Yakap"	Martinez	3:12
8.	"Harinawa"	Lui Pio, Gellada	4:13
