= Miguel Escueta =

Filipino male vocalist, singer and performer

- Born: Miguel Escueta; May 6, 1984 (age 41); Manila, Philippines
- Genres: Pop
- Occupations: singer, songwriter, entrepreneur
- Years active: 2005–present
- Label: MCA Music Inc.
- Member of: The Morning Episodes
- Website: Miguel Escueta

Miguel Escueta (Tagalog pronunciation: [ʔɛsˈkwɛta]; born May 6, 1984) is a Filipino male vocalist, singer and performer. He was a regular performer on the 3-year Sunday variety show of GMA 7, Party Pilipinas. In 2013, he launched his own band The Morning Episodes.

== Discography ==
=== Albums ===
Album	Tracks	Year	Records
I Am M.E.	Isipin; Falling Away; Close To Edge; Pull Through; Balik Simula; Take Me There; Live It; Sa Pagkawala (2006); Where I Stand? Falling Away (Acoustic); Take Me There (Acoustic); Isipin (Acoustic)	2007	MCA Music Inc.
I Am M.E. Amplified 2CD	Isipin; Falling Away; Close to the Edge; Pull Through; Balik Simula; Take Me There; Live It; Sa Pagkawala (2006); Where I Stand? Falling Away (Acoustic); Take Me There (Acoustic); Isipin (Acoustic); Handa; Mr. Brightside; Blue Monday; Just Like Heaven; Balik Simula (Reloaded); I Am M.E. (Amplified Session); I Am M.E. (Launch Video)	2008	MCA Music Inc.
Now It Starts	An Introduction (waves); Now It Starts; Love Fool; Rush Rush (feat. Sabrina & Kris); We Belong Together; The Take Back; A Bridge (waves); Blue Monday; Only Hope; Sleeping While The World's Awake; Mr. Brightside; Just Like Heaven; You	2010	MCA Music Inc.

=== EP ===
Album	Tracks	Year	Records
Sleeping While the World's Awake	The Take Back; Sleeping While The World Awake; Only Hope; Balik Simula; Blue Monday	2009	MCA Music, Inc.

== Singles Featured Artist ==
- This Is Me (Feat. Julianne Tarroja, from the Disney Movie Soundtrack Camp Rock, 2009).
