= Ikot-Ikot =

- Official music video thumbnail

Single by Sarah Geronimo

from the album Expressions
- Released: July 22, 2013
- Recorded: 2013
- Genre: Pop; R&B; P-pop
- Length: 3:52
- Label: Viva Records
- Songwriter: Thyro Alfaro
- Producer: Jumbo "Bojam" de Belen

Sarah Geronimo singles chronology
| "It Takes a Man and a Woman" (2013) | "Ikot-Ikot" (2013) | "Tayo" (2014) |

Music video
- "Ikot-Ikot" on YouTube

"Ikot-Ikot" (transl. Round and Round) is a 2013 hit song recorded by Filipino singer-actress Sarah Geronimo. Written by Thyro Alfaro, it was produced by Jumbo "Bojam" de Belen and released under Viva Records. The song served as the lead single off Geronimo's 2013 platinum album Expressions. It became available for digital download on July 22, 2013 but before its release date, the song was sent to different radio stations across the Metro Manila on the second week of July. The song garnered "Song of the Year" nominations from major music award giving bodies in the Philippines including the Awit Awards and Myx Music Awards.

== Critical reception ==
Joseph R. Atilano of Inquirer.net gave a positive review, noting that "Ikot-Ikot" is an excellent choice to be the lead single from the album because "It isn't boring to listen to." "Sarah delivers her vocals with a sense of urgency that matches the upbeat pace of 'Ikot-Ikot'", he added. At the end, he gave the song a "Thumbs Up!".

== Music video ==
=== Background and release ===
The music video was directed by Paul Basinillo, co-directed by Sarah Geronimo, and choreographed by Georcelle Dapat-Sy of G-force. The music video was premiered on Viva Music's official YouTube Channel on October 19, 2013. The music video has reached 3,498,691 YouTube views as of October 19, 2014, a year after it was released.

== Live performances ==
Geronimo performed the song on different TV shows and Awards Night. She sang the hit single on ASAP 18 for her 25th birthday celebration. She also performed the song on ABS-CBN's noontime show It's Showtime on October 19, 2013.

== Cover versions ==
The Voice Kids winner Lyca Gairanod along with TVK finalist Darlene performed the song on It's Showtime in May 2015, actress Meg Imperial covered the song on her YouTube Channel, Singer-host Tippy Dos Santos performed the song for Myx Studio Sessions in April 2017, Naisa Lasalosi performed the song on I Love OPM in March 2016. Other covers include Donnalyn Bartolome, Sam Mangubat, Sam Concepcion, Belle Mariano, Climax and CH4RMD.

== Awards ==
| Year | Awards ceremony | Award | Results |
|---|---|---|---|
| 2013 | Rappler Social Media Awards | LSS of the Year | Won |
| 2013 | Awit Awards | Song of the Year | Nominated |
| 2013 | Awit Awards | Best R&B Recording | Won |
| 2014 | PMPC Star Awards for Music | Song of the Year | Nominated |
| 2014 | World Music Awards | World Best Song | Nominated |
| 2014 | Myx Music Awards | Best Song | Nominated |
| 2014 | Myx Music Awards | Best Music Video | Nominated |
| 2014 | MOR Music Awards | Song of the Year | Nominated |
