= Above, Over and Beyond =

Studio album by Hale
- Released: April 28, 2008
- Genre: Alternative rock, power pop, Pinoy rock
- Length: 52:39
- Label: EMI Philippines
- Producer: Francis Guevarra, Russell Estaquio

Hale chronology
Twilight (2006)	Above, Over and Beyond (2008)	Kundiman (2009)

Singles from Above, Over and Beyond
- 1. "Pitong Araw" Released: April 5, 2008; 2. "Leap Of Faith" Released: August 9, 2008; 3. "Over And Over (And Over Again)" Released: October 12, 2008; 4. "Sandali Na Lang" Released: March 13, 2009

Professional ratings
Review scores
Source	Rating
twoisequaltozero.wordpress.com	C+

Above, Over and Beyond is the third studio album by Filipino rock band Hale released on April 28, 2008 under EMI Philippines. The album contains singles Pitong Araw, Leap Of Faith, Over And Over (And Over Again) and Sandali Na Lang. It was the last album to feature drummer Omnie Saroca.

== History ==
Having to deal with the pressure they encountered due to their instant success after the release of their two preceding albums, Hale decided to make a 10-month hiatus from the music industry as they reasoned out it was affecting their status as musical artists and their performances. During their time of hiatus, they established the Treehouse Productions where they would help the needy children suffering from illnesses through music.

It was not long until Hale was motivated to put in work for their third effort. After the release of the first single of this album, Pitong Araw, the album was later released on April 28, 2008.

== Track listing ==
No.	Title	Writer(s)	Length
1.	"Over and Over (And Over Again)"	Lui Pio, Martinez, Gellada, Saroca	3:25
2.	"This Is a Happy Song"	Lui Pio, Martinez, Gellada, Saroca	3:16
3.	"Sundown (Feat. Monique Rae)"	Lui Pio, Martinez, Gellada, Saroca	3:06
4.	"Pitong Araw"	Espiritu	4:17
5.	"Sandali Na Lang"	Lui Pio, Martinez, Gellada, Saroca	3:40
6.	"The End"	Gellada	4:17
7.	"Requiem"	Martinez	4:24
8.	"Back from Beginning"	Lui Pio, Martinez	4:42
9.	"Tama Na Ba?"	Saroca, Espiritu, Ables	4:32
10.	"Skip the Drama"	Lui Pio, Martinez, Gellada, Saroca	5:03
11.	"Hagatna Bay"	Martinez	2:56
12.	"Tree House (Feat. Monique Rae)"	Lui Pio	4:54
13.	"Leap of Faith"	Lui Pio, Martinez, Gellada, Saroca	4:08
