= Hale (band) =

Filipino alternative rock band

- Origin: Metro Manila, Philippines
- Genres: Alternative rock; pop rock; experimental
- Years active: 2004–2010; 2015–present
- Labels: Warner Music Philippines; EMI/PolyEast; EMI/Universal Music
- Members: Champ Lui Pio; Roll Martinez; Sheldon Gellada; Pao Santiago; Chino David
- Past members: Omnie Saroca

Hale is a Filipino alternative rock band, formed in Manila, Philippines in 2004. The group originally consisted of singer and guitarist Champ Lui Pio, bassist Sheldon Gellada, guitarist Roll Martinez and drummer Omnie Saroca. This line-up remained unchanged until the departure of Saroca in 2008; he was then replaced by Paolo Santiago. In March 2017, Chino David of Silent Sanctuary became the band's fifth member.

Hale signed to EMI, now PolyEast Records in 2004 and released their self–titled debut album, Hale (2005). The album was critically acclaimed; resulting in the accolade as the Awit Award’s Group of the Year. The band’s debut album included the single "The Day You Said Goodnight" which brought them mainstream success in Southeast Asia. The following year, the band released their second studio album Twilight (2006) which received mostly positive reviews and critical success. The band released their third album Above, Over and Beyond (2008) which received generally mixed reviews and saw limited success. This is the last album featuring original drummer Omnie Saroca. Paolo Santiago (formerly of Join the Club) subsequently replaced him as the band began recording their fourth studio album Kundiman released in 2009.

In 2010, the group disbanded. Lead singer Champ Lui Pio announced his intention to begin a solo career as a musician and actor.

In January 2015 after weeks of speculation that the band was reuniting, the group held their first gig. Their first single in five years "See You" was debuted in early 2015 and their fifth album Time and Space under Warner Music Philippines was released via iTunes and Spotify. In 2016, the group collaborated with singer Sarah Geronimo for the song "The Great Unknown". It was written by the band's lead guitarist, Roll Martinez, for Geronimo's twelfth album. The song's music video peaked at no. 1 on both MYX Philippines and MTV Philippines charts.

During the 2022 Philippine Presidential Elections, Hale performed at political rallies of the Uniteam, in support of President-elect Bongbong Marcos.

== History ==
=== 2004–2005: Formation and early years ===
Roll Martinez and Sheldon Gellada were music majors from University of Santo Tomas. Champ Lui-Pio was from De La Salle University - College of Saint Benilde. Omnie Saroca was from Technological University of the Philippines. The four of them formed Hale in mid-2004, and soon after signed up with EMI Philippines (now PolyEast Records) in November 2004.

=== 2005–2006: Debut album and mainstream success ===
In 2005, the band released their debut self–titled album Hale, consisting of singles, "Broken Sonnet", "The Day You Said Goodnight", "Kahit Pa", "Kung Wala Ka" and "Blue Sky" together with "Tollgate" which was released together with the re-issuing of the album on March 2, 2006. "The Day You Said Goodnight" marked the first steps of Hale's massive success to the mainstream and gained tremendous popularity as the singles were released. Their big hit single, "The Day You Said Goodnight” was also nominated many times by most of the music media as OPM Song of the Year of 2005. Soon, the band was also nominated as Band of the Year and Best new OPM group artist for 2005 in numerous music awards.

Hale re-issued their debut album together with the single "Tollgate" on March 2, 2006. At the same year, the debut album had reached 90,000 copies sold. They were also chosen to make a commercial endorsement for Nescafé Philippines and a jingle "One Moment, One Nescafé" written by them in promotion of the Nescafé products.

=== 2006–2008: Twilight to Treehouse Production and hiatus ===
Hale released their sophomore effort Twilight on September 30, 2006, consisting of singles "Waltz", "Hide And Seek", "Shooting Star" and "The Ballad Of". The music video of "Waltz" was also nominated many times as the Most Favorited Music Video in 2006, marking another step of Hale's success to the mainstream. The album was also certified Gold (15,000 copies sold) a week after its release.

It was said that the band encountered tremendous amount of pressure to record their sophomore effort. On the other hand, their effort was meant to reflect their success from the preceding album as a band where their musical influences and styles had encompassed a wider spectrum of musical arrangements.

Having encountered pressure from the mainstream successes of their first two albums, the band self-imposed a 10-month hiatus. During then, they established the Treehouse Productions where they would help the needy children suffering from mental and physical illnesses through music. In the process, other music acts eventually signed up for Treehouse Productions to help the band achieve their objectives, such as Rico Blanco and Mayonnaise.

=== 2008–2009: Above, Over and Beyond and the departure of Saroca ===
Soon after their hiatus, they released their third effort, Above, Over and Beyond, which consisted of singles "Pitong Araw", "Leap Of Faith", "Over And Over (And Over Again)" and "Sandali Na Lang" on April 28, 2008. Even before the release of their third effort, "Sundown", which featured Monique Rae, was released as a jingle for the promotion of the local toothpaste product, Close-Up. Despite expectations, album sales for the album was low due to economic woes of the band's music label, EMI Philippines. As a result, the band resulted in promoting the album independently which, however, saw limited success. Hence, just like Twilight, the success of the album did not come up to par with the former albums.

Hale drummer and percussionist Omnie Saroca left the band in the same year to focus on other issues outside the music industry. In turn, former drummer Paolo Santiago of Join the Club joined the band to replace Omnie Saroca in late 2008.

=== 2009–2010: Kundiman and final days ===
Their fourth and final album, Kundiman, released on July 27, 2009, the band started promoting their album soon after its release, about a month after the first single, Bahay Kubo, went for radio airplay. Other singles include "Kalesa", "Harinawa", and "Magkaibang Mundo".

Of all eight songs in the album, written in Tagalog. They also sought guidance with OPM band Mayonnaise's Monty Macalino in the song composition and arrangements of the album.

=== 2010–2015: Break–up and side projects ===
The band announced that they are no longer interested to have gigs and producing more music. Champ Lui Pio announced his intention and interest in acting and being a solo music artist. Champ's decision to disband Hale was allegedly kept from his bandmates, who were not given prior notice and only learned of the break-up after his public announcement. The band officially went on their separate ways on August 6, 2010. It was announced through their official Facebook page.

=== 2015–2017: Reformation and Time and Space ===
Rumors of the band reuniting, while not widespread, started online in mid-2014 until word became official that the band had reunited through their gig on January 13, 2015. This was also their first gig since their break-up in 5 years. Their first single "See You" debuted on January 27, 2015.

Their EP, Time and Space, was released on March 30, 2015 via ITunes and Spotify. It was announced through Hale's official Facebook page.

In 2016, they collaborated with singer Sarah Geronimo for the song The Great Unknown which was written by the band's Roll Martinez. It was released as the second single from Geronimo's album with the same title.

=== 2017–present: Sixth studio album, arrival of Chino David and future ===
On September 8, 2017, the band released "Alon", accompanied by its lyric video. The song would later be featured in the soundtrack for the 2017 Metro Manila Film Festival entry, Siargao. The song was awarded "Best Theme Song" at the awards show held on December 27, 2017. After touring with the band in early 2017, violinist Chino David (formerly of Silent Sanctuary) has officially joined the band on October 9, 2017. The music video for “Alon” has been released on December 10, 2017. The band released their fifth full-length album of the same name in June 2018.

In February 2024, Hale reunited with the EMI label, now relaunched under UMG Philippines.

== Band members ==
Current members

- Champ Lui Pio – lead vocals, rhythm guitar (2004–2010, 2015–present)
- Roll Martinez – lead guitar, backing vocals (2004–2010, 2015–present); keyboards (2015–2017)
- Sheldon Gellada – bass guitar (2004–2010, 2015–present)
- Paolo Santiago – drums, percussion (2008–2010, 2015–present)
- Chino David – violin, keyboards, rhythm guitar (2017–present); occasional backing vocals (2025–present)

Former members

- Geronimo "Omnie" Saroca – drums, percussion (2004–2008)

Timeline

== Discography ==
Studio albums

- Hale (2005)
- Twilight (2006)
- Above, Over and Beyond (2008)
- Kundiman (2009)
- Time and Space (2015)
- Alon (2018)

== Awards and nominations ==
Year	Award giving body	Category	Nominated work	Results
2005	97.1 WLS-FM Year End Awards	Song of the Year	"The Day You Said Goodnight"	Won
2005	Magic 89.9 WTM Year End Awards	OPM Song of the Year	"The Day You Said Goodnight"	Won
2005	MTV Pilipinas Music Awards	Best New Artist	—N/a	Won
2005	NU Rock Awards	Best New Artist	—N/a	Nominated
2005	NU Rock Awards	Rising Sun Award	—N/a	Nominated
2005	NU Rock Awards	Song of the Year	"The Day You Said Goodnight"	Nominated
2005	NU Rock Awards	Best Male Award	Champ Lui Pio	Nominated
2005	NU Rock Awards	Music Video of the Year	"The Day You Said Goodnight"	Nominated
2005	RX 93.1 Year End Awards	OPM Song of the Year	"The Day You Said Goodnight"	Won
2005	RX 93.1 Year End Awards	OPM Band of the Year	—N/a	Won
2005	TM 89.9 Year End Awards	Best New OPM Artist	—N/a	Won
2006	Awit Awards	Best Ballad	"The Day You Said Goodnight"	Won
2006	Awit Awards	People's Choice Award for Favorite Band	—N/a	Won
2006	MTV Asia Awards	Favorite Artist (Philippines)	—N/a	Nominated
2006	MTV Pilipinas Music Awards	Best Pop Video	"Kung Wala Ka"	Won
2006	MTV Pilipinas Music Awards	Artist of the Month for October	—N/a	Won
2006	MYX Music Awards	Best Music Video	"The Day You Said Goodnight"	Nominated
2006	MYX Music Awards	Favorite Song	"The Day You Said Goodnight"	Nominated
2006	MYX Music Awards	Favorite New Artist	—N/a	Nominated
2006	MYX Music Awards	Favorite Group	—N/a	Nominated
2006	Smart People's Choice Award	Best Group of the Year	—N/a	Won
2006	SOP Pasiklaband (GMA 7)	Best Pop Rock Band	—N/a	Won
2007	MYX Music Awards	Favorite Artist	—N/a	Nominated
2007	MYX Music Awards	Favorite Rock Video	"Waltz"	Nominated
2007	MYX Music Awards	Favorite Group	—N/a	Nominated
2007	NU Rock Awards	Best Album Pacakaging	Inksurge.com for "Twilight"	Nominated
2009	MYX Music Awards	Favorite Song	"Pitong Araw"	Nominated
2009	NU Rock Awards	Best Album Packaging	(Eric David for "Kundiman")	Nominated
2009	NU Rock Awards	Producer of the Year	(with Angee Rozul & Monty Macalino for "Kundiman")	Nominated
2009	RX 93.1 Year End Awards	OPM Band of the Year	—N/a	Won
2010	MYX Music Awards	Favorite Music Video	"Bahay Kubo"	Nominated
2010	MYX Music Awards	Favorite Group	—N/a	Nominated
2017	Metro Manila Film Festival	Best Theme Song	"Alon" for Siargao	Won
2019	PMPC Star Awards for Music	Album of the Year	"Alon"	Nominated

=== Other Awards ===
- Gold Award (15,000 units) for debut album Hale (June 2005)
- Platinum Award (30,000 units) for debut album Hale (August 2005)
- Double Platinum Award (60,000 units) for debut album Hale (November 2005)
- Triple Platinum Award (90,000 units) for debut album Hale (May 2006)
- Gold Award (15,000 units) for second album Twilight (October 2006)
