= Yeng Constantino discography =

- Studio albums: 6
- Soundtrack albums: 12
- Live albums: 1
- Compilation albums: 22
- Singles: 43
- Music videos: 12

The discography of Filipino singer and songwriter Yeng Constantino consists of six studio albums, one live album, twenty two compilation albums, forty three singles (including nine as a featured artist), twelve music videos, and two extended plays.

== Albums ==
=== Studio albums ===
List of albums, with sales and certifications
Title	Album details	Certifications
Salamat	Released: January 19, 2007; Label: Star Records; Formats: CD, digital download	PARI: 2× Platinum
Journey	Released: February 29, 2008; Label: Star Records; Formats: CD, digital download	PARI: Gold
Lapit	Released: October 9, 2009; Label: Star Records; Formats: CD, digital download	
Metamorphosis	Released: January 28, 2013; Label: Star Records; Formats: CD, digital download	PARI: Gold
All About Love	Released: November 25, 2014; Label: Star Records; Formats: CD, digital download	
Synesthesia	Released: March 23, 2018; Label: Star Records; Formats: CD, digital download	

=== Live albums ===
Title	Album details	Certifications
Yeng Versions Live	Released: August 5, 2011; Label: Star Records, Dream Music; Formats: CD, digital download	PARI: Gold

=== Compilation albums ===
Title	Album details
Pinoy Dream Academy Originals (Volume 1)	Released: 2006; Labels: Star Records, Dream Music
Pinoy Dream Academy Originals (Volume 2)	Released: 2006; Labels: Star Records, Dream Music
Pinoy Dream Academy Originals (Volume 3)	Released: 2006; Labels: Star Records, Dream Music
Pinoy Dream Academy Originals (Volume 4)	Released: 2006; Labels: Star Records, Dream Music
Star Magic Christmas Album	Released: 2007; Labels: Star Records, Dream Music
Judy Ann Santos: Musika ng Buhay Ko	Released: 2007; Label: Star Records
Nagmamahal Kapamilya Album	Released: 2007; Label: Star Records
My Girl OST Album	Released: 2008; Label: Star Records
The Next Step Vol. 2 Album	Released: 2014; Labels: Academy of Rock
Transforming Love Album	Released: 2014; Label: CBN Asia

== Singles and EPs ==
=== As lead artist ===
List of singles as lead artist, showing year released, selected chart positions, and associated albums
Year	Title	Peak chart positions		Album
Year	Title	PHL	TPS	Album
"Hawak Kamay"	2006	—	—	Salamat
"Pangarap Lang"	2006	—	—	Salamat
"If We Fall In Love (with RJ Jimenez)"	2006	—	—	Salamat
"Salamat"	2007	—	—	Salamat
"Cool Off"	2007	—	—	Salamat
"Time In"	2007	—	—	Salamat
"Habambuhay"	2007	—	—	Journey
"Ikaw Lang Talaga"	2008	—	—	Journey
"Di na Ganun"	2008	—	—	Journey
"Himig ng Pag-ibig (Dyosa Theme)"	2008	—	—	Journey
"Sabihin Mo Na"	2008	62	—	My Girl OST
"Lapit"	2009	—	—	Lapit
"Wag Kang Magtatanong"	2009	—	—	Lapit
"Jeepney Love Story"	2009	—	—	Lapit
"Wag Na"	2009	—	—	Lapit
"Siguro"	2011	—	—	Lapit
"Paniwalaan Mo"	2011	—	—	Yeng Versions Live
"Alaala"	2012	—	—	Himig Handog P-Pop Love Songs
"Pag-Ibig"	2012	—	—	Metamorphosis
"B.A.B.A.Y."	2013	—	—	Metamorphosis
"Chinito"	2013	—	—	Metamorphosis
"Sandata"	2013	—	—	Metamorphosis
"Josephine"	2013	—	—	Metamorphosis
"Ikaw"	2014	—	—	All About Love
"What's up ahead (with Yan Asuncion)"	2014	—	—	All About Love
"Paasa (T.A.N.G.A.)"	2016	—	—	Yeng 10 [10 Years Of Yeng Constantino]
"Pinipigil"	2018	—	—	Synesthesia
"Ako Muna"	2018	—	—	Synesthesia
"Tahimik"	2018	—	—	Synesthesia
"Sana Na Lang" (with Gray Sky Sun)	2019	—	—	Non-album singles
"Dasal"	2020	—	—	Synesthesia
"Kumapit Ka"	2021	—	—	Non-album singles
"Wag Kang Bibitaw"	2021	—	—	Non-album singles
“Hamon Ng Mundo”	2023	—	—	Non-album singles
“Pasko sa Pinas - 2023 Version”	2023	—	—	Non-album singles
“Kung Uulitin”	2024	—	—	Non-album singles
"Babala"	2024	—	—	Non-album singles
"Ikaw - (2024 Remastered Version)"	2024	—	—	Non-album singles
“Lumulutang Nahuhulog”	2025	—	—	Non-album singles

=== As featured artist ===
Year	Title	Album
2012	"Kung Wala Na Nga" (6CycleMind with Yeng Constantino and Kean Cipriano)	Non-album singles
2012	"Manong Guard" (Emmanuelle Vera with Yeng Constantino)	Emmanuelle
2013	"Bespren" (Coach Jungee with Yeng Constantino)	Non-album singles
2013	"Better Than Yesterday" (Sheikh Haikel with Yeng Constantino)	Non-album singles
2014	"Kahit Maputi Na Ang Buhok Ko" (David DiMuzio with Yeng Constantino)	Reimagined
2014	"+63" (Spongecola with Yeng Constantino)	Ultrablessed
2014	"Chinito Problems" (Enchong Dee with Yeng Constantino)	Enchong Dee
2015	"Kaibigan Mo" (Sarah Geronimo with Yeng Constantino)	The Great Unknown
2016	"Wonderful Life (Mi Oh My)" (Matoma with Yeng Constantino)	The Angry Birds Movie: Original; Motion Picture Soundtrack

Extended Plays

• Reimagined (2023)

• Reimagined 2 (Live) (2024)

== Soundtracks ==
Year	Title	TV/Film
2007	"Himala" (with Jay-R Siaboc)	Habang May Buhay
2007	"Wag Mong Iwan Ang Puso Ko"	Ysabella
2008	"Sikat Ang Pinoy" (with Emman Abatayo)	PBB Celebrity Edition 2
2008	"Sabihin Mo Na"	My Girl (Philippine TV series)
2010	"Sana"	May Bukas Pa
2014	"Chinito"	Bride for Rent
2024	“Fruitcake”	Fruitcake

== Other Appearances ==
Year	Title	Album
2007	"Wag Mong Iwan Ang Puso Ko"	Telesine The Greatest TV & Movie Theme Songs
2007	"Pasko sa Pinas"	Ngayong Pasko Magniningning Ang Pilipino
2008	"Habambuhay"	Best Of TV And Movie Themes
2009	"Galing ng Pinoy"	Bagong Himig Advocacy
2013	"Alaala"	Himig Handog P-Pop Love Songs
2014	"SeenZoned"	Academy of Rock's The Next Step Vol. 2
2014	"United for Healthier Kids"	

== Music videos ==
Year	Title	Director
2007	"Time In"	Avid Liongoren
2007	"Cool Off"	Avid Liongoren
2008	"Ikaw Lang Talaga"	Mark Ocampo
2008	"Di Na Ganun"	Mark Ocampo
2009	"Lapit"	Avid Liongoren
2009	"Wag Kang Mag Tatanong"	Avid Liongoren
2010	"Jeepney Love Story"	Avid Liongoren
2010	"Wag Na"	Avid Liongoren
2011	"Siguro"	Avid Liongoren
2012	"Pag-ibig"	Mackie Galvez
2013	"B.A.B.A.Y"	Avid Liongoren
2013	"Alaala"	PCU students
2014	"SeenZoned"	
2014	"Ikaw"	Cristhian Escolano
2024	"Babala"	Peewee Gonzales and Jonathan Tal Placido
