= Metamorphosis (Yeng Constantino album) =

Studio album by Yeng Constantino
- Released: January 28, 2013
- Genres: OPM, Pop
- Label: Star Music
- Producer: Raimund Marasigan

Yeng Constantino chronology
Yeng Versions Live (2011)	Metamorphosis (2013)	All About Love (2014)

Singles from Metamorphosis
- 1. "B.A.B.A.Y" Released: January 17, 2013; 2. "Chinito" Released: March 24, 2013; 3. "Sandata" Released: July 3, 2013; 4. "Josephine" Released: July 27, 2013

Metamorphosis is the fourth studio album by Filipina singer-songwriter Yeng Constantino, released in the Philippines on January 28, 2013, by Star Music. The album was certified Gold by PARI. The album spawned the singles "B.A.B.A.Y" and hit song "Chinito", and "Sanadata", "Josephine."

== Background ==
"Metamorphosis means change and transformation, and that's what this album is all about. Metamorphosis doesn't really take out who you really are, but it changes you for the better. It's about not being afraid of who you can be. And that best describes my new album that carries my new sound, and the new Yeng.""

— Yeng, on the album's change and transformation.

After the success of her first three studio albums Salamat (2007), Journey (2008), Lapit (2009) and her first compilation live album Yeng Versions Live, Constantino returned to the music scene with her latest album. The 10-track album represent the evolution of Constanino's music.

Just like what “metamorphosis” means, Yeng will reportedly have a new look and style in this new album, which starts with the flame red hair. Although determined to stand out and create an impact, Yeng confessed that she was initially concerned whether or not her fans are ready to listen to her new music. "At first, I was worried if my supporters are ready for this change. But I thought it's good because I'm giving them something new. And personally, I also want to challenge myself to do things that will excite me," Yeng related.

== Singles ==
- "Pag-Ibig" was a single in promotion of Constantino's concert at the Music Museum to support Yeng Versions Live. The song debuted on the cable music channel Myx in February 2012 and is included in Metamorphosis as a promotional single.
- "B.A.B.A.Y" was released as lead single of the album. The song marks her departure from her past works. The single premiered on the FM station Tambayan 101.9 on January 9 and was released for digital download at mymusicstore.com.ph the following day. The music video of "B.A.B.A.Y" debuted on Myx on January 17, 2013. The song was also translated into English and covered by Mike Gonzales available on SoundCloud and Reverbnation. In January 2022, 9 years after the song's release, Constantino revealed that the song was about her past romantic relationship with Ryan Bang.
- "Chinito" was chosen as second single of the album. The song originally entitled "Chinita" was written and performed by "Jed Dumawal" back in 2010, and is the only track from the album that was not composed by Constantino. Star Records held a “Chinito Lyric Video Contest", the winner of the contest is Raymond Weil Ylagan, Constantino chose the winner of the contest. It was released on YouTube. The music video premiered on May 24, 2013, on Myx. The video features Filipino actor Enchong Dee as her love interest whom Constantino expressed her admiration. On June 30, 2013, she performed this song, during the grand coronation night of Mr. and Ms. Chinatown Philippines. The music video of this song reached 3 million views on YouTube. As of August 2013, this song named as her second most viewed video of all time, which surpassed her music video for "Lapit". Also the most popular and successful single from the album. Chinito held the #1 spot for 5 weeks in the Myx chart. It was later used as the theme song for the movie Bride for Rent. It was used the chorus line of the said song by Constantino in the 2014 song "Chinito Problems" sung by Dee. To date "Chinito" music video reached 19.7 million views on YouTube with the official video and the few other uploaded music video.
- Sandata" is the third single, it is the most spiritual song in the album. In the music video, Yeng was seen dripping wet as the rain continues to pour on her while in the middle of careless people. Yeng also pours her heart out while singing "Kung mabangis sa 'yo ang mundo, mayroong puwang sa piling ko. Ako ang sandata." It was directed by Mackie Galvez.
- "Josephine" is the fourth single, it talks about her past love life. The music video for Josephine has premiered on MYX on July 27, together with the music video debut of another Yeng's song, Sandata, both directed by Mackie Galvez.

== Track listing ==
No.	Title	Writer(s)	Length
1.	"B.A.B.A.Y"	Yeng Constantino	3:10
2.	"Hahanapin Kita"	Yeng Constantino	4:48
3.	"Messiah"	Yeng Constantino	4:10
4.	"Chinito"	Jed Dumawal	3:46
5.	"Josephine"	Yeng Constantino	5:36
6.	"Teleserye"	Yeng Constantino	3:56
7.	"Pasenya Na"	Yeng Constantino	4:28
8.	"Pag-Ibig"	Yeng Constantino	5:21
9.	"Sandata"	Yeng Constantino	5:05
10.	"'Di Pa Huli"	Yeng Constantino	4:49

== Certification ==
Region	Certification	Certified units/sales
Philippines (PARI)	Gold	7,500^{*}
^{*} Sales figures based on certification alone.

== Release history ==
Country	Release date	Format	Label
Philippines	January 28, 2013	CD	Star Records
Philippines	January 25, 2013	Digital download	Star Records
