= Pinoy Dream Academy season 1 =

Season of television series

Pinoy Dream Academy
- Season 1
- Hosted by: Nikki Gil
- Winner: Yeng Constantino

Release
- Original network: ABS-CBN
- Original release: August 27 – December 16, 2006

Season chronology
- Next → Season 2

The first season of Pinoy Dream Academy formally began on August 27, 2006, and ended on December 16 of the same year replacing U Can Dance. Nikki Gil was the main host of this season, while joining her in the Saturday Gala Nights were Bianca Gonzalez, Roxanne Barcelo, and Toni Gonzaga. Sam Milby was also part of the Saturday shows, but had stopped appearing mid-season. Barcelo also hosted the UpLate edition of the show.

Yeng Constantino of Rizal was proclaimed as the "Grand Star Dreamer" of the first season on December 16, 2006. Jay-R Siaboc of Cebu and Ronnie Liang of Pampanga were proclaimed as the runners-up. The other finalists of the competition were Panky Trinidad of Cebu, Irish Fullerton of the United States of America and Chad Peralta of Australia. Constantino eventually became a successful recording artist in her own right.

Thirty-Eight contestants were chosen from different areas around the world. The Metro Manila dreamers all came from Metro Manila and nearby provinces. The dreamers from Luzon, Visayas and Mindanao are called the regional dreamers. The dreamers from Australia, San Francisco, Dubai, Japan and Europe are called the global dreamers.

== Contestants ==
On August 27, 2006, the Academy Dream Night took place in front of Cebu Provincial Capitol Grounds, hosted by Nikki Gil, Acoustic Jamming Section, where members were asked to sing their original composition; Music and Dance Section, where members sang popular dance songs; Music Literature Section, where members sang romantic ballads; Musicthectics Section, where members were asked to sing songs of the band, The Eraserheads, in their own style; Language of Music Section, where members sang native songs; and Rockers' Section, where members sang rock version of popular novelty songs. After two sections had performed, the hosts then announced the Academy finalists.

The selection of accepted finalists was done thrice, and 16 finalists accepted into the Academy on August 28. As a surprise twist, four more finalists were added to the roster and they entered the Academy the following day. The Scholars are expelled on the Saturday Gala Nights and Exit the Academy the next day.

Yeng Constantino was proclaimed the Grand Star Dreamer, followed by Jay-R Siaboc as the 2nd Star Dreamer and Ronnie Liang as the 3rd Star Dreamer. Panky Trinidad, Irish Fullerton and Chad Peralta were the other finalists of the competition.

Yeng Constantino (17, a "rebel-rocker" from Rodriguez, Rizal)
Songs Performed

1. Hawak Kamay - Yeng Constantino, with Davey, Joan, Jun and Ronnie
2. Dinggin - Davey Langit, with Iya, Kristoff, Michelle and RJ
3. The Day You said Goodnight - Hale, with Chad, Michelle, RJ and Yvan
4. Ang Pag-ibig Kong Ito - Moonstar88, medley with Michelle and Oona
5. Ligaya - The Eraserheads, duet with RJ
6. I Will Always Love You - Whitney Houston
7. Pangarap Lang - Alvin K. Gonzales, medley with Jay-R, Panky and Rosita
8. In My Life - Patti Austin
9. Together Again - Janet Jackson, medley with Eman and Panky
10. You Oughta Know - Alanis Morissette, medley with Chad and Panky
11. Bulag, Pipi at Bingi - Freddie Aguilar
12. I Will Survive - Gloria Gaynor
13. I'll Never Get Over You Getting Over Me - Exposé
14. Pag-alis - Barbie Almalbis, performance with Barbie Almalbis
15. Awit ng Kabataan - Rivermaya (Opening Act), trio with Irish and Panky, Winner - December 16, 2006
16. Queen of the Night - Whitney Houston, medley and trio with Irish and Panky, Winner - December 16, 2006
17. Respect - Aretha Franklin, medley and trio with Irish and Panky, Winner - December 16, 2006
18. I'm Every Woman - Chaka Khan, medley and trio with Irish and Panky, Winner - December 16, 2006
19. Lady Marmalade - Labelle, medley and trio with Irish and Panky, Winner - December 16, 2006
20. Himala - Rivermaya, duet with Jay-R, Winner - December 16, 2006
21. Salamat - Yeng Constantino (Final Three Song), Winner - December 16, 2006

Jay-R Siaboc (19, the vocalist of Scrambled Eggs band from Cebu)
Songs Performed

1. Babalik Rin - Yvan Lambatan, with Irish, Kristoff, Oona and Yvan
2. Hilot - Jay-R Siaboc, with Chad, Eman, Jun and Yvan
3. Isang Linggong Pag-ibig - Imelda Papin, with Geoff, Irish, Iya, Jun and Panky
4. Arigato Tomodaci - Eman Abatayo, Jun Hirano and Jay-R Siaboc, with Eman, Kristoff and RJ (with Jun)
5. Nanliligaw, Naliligaw - Lloyd Umali and Ima Castro, duet with Iya
6. Hanggang - Wency Cornejo, medley with Chai, Irish, Ronnie and Rosita
7. May Tama Ako - Rickenson Calubad, medley with Panky, Rosita and Yeng
8. Ang Seksing Nobya Ko - unknown performer, medley with Iya
9. Banal na Aso - Yano
10. Too Much Love Will Kill You - Queen
11. Salamat - Dawn, medley with Davey, Ronnie and Yvan
12. Have Yourself a Merry Little Christmas - Judy Garland
13. Naglibog - Scrambled Eggs
14. Ever Since the World Began - Survivor
15. Bitiw - Sponge Cola, performance with Sponge Cola
16. Superhero - Rocksteddy (Opening Act), trio with Chad and Ronnie, 1st Runner-Up - December 16, 2006
17. Kiss - Prince and The Revolution, medley and trio with Chad and Ronnie, 1st Runner-Up - December 16, 2006
18. Da Ya Think I'm Sexy? - Rod Stewart, medley and trio with Chad and Ronnie, 1st Runner-Up - December 16, 2006
19. Simply Irresistible - Robert Palmer, medley and trio with Chad and Ronnie, 1st Runner-Up - December 16, 2006
20. Himala - Rivermaya, duet with Yeng, 1st Runner-Up - December 16, 2006
21. Kisapmata - Rivermaya (Final Three Song), 1st Runner-Up - December 16, 2006

Ronnie Liang (21, a former Pinoy Pop Superstar contestant from Angeles City)
Songs Performed

1. Hawak Kamay - Yeng Constantino, with Davey, Joan, Jun and Yeng
2. Salamat Sa'Yo Ina - Ronnie Liang, with Davey, Gemma, Joan and Oona
3. Karaniwang Tao - Joey Ayala, with Chai, Davey, Eman and Joan
4. Magdalena - Freddie Aguilar (Tagalog with Italian translation), with Chad, Irish and Joan
5. Kailangan Mo, Kailangan Ko - Richard Tan and Bambi Bonus, trio with Michelle and Oona
6. Maging Sino Ka Man - Rey Valera, medley with Chai, Irish, Jay-R and Rosita
7. Kung Kailangan Mo Ako - Rey Valera
8. Macho Gwapito - Rico J. Puno
9. Paglisan - Color It Red. medley with Chai and Jay-r
10. Pangako Sa'yo - Sharon Cuneta
11. Narda - Kamikazee, medley with Davey, Jay-R and Yvan
12. Sana Ngayong Pasko - Ariel Rivera
13. You Raise Me Up - Josh Groban
14. Babaero - Randy Santiago
15. Nakapagtataka - Sponge Cola, performance with Sponge Cola
16. Superhero - Rocksteddy (Opening Act), trio with Chad and Jay-R, 2nd Runner-Up - December 16, 2006
17. Kiss - Prince and The Revolution, medley and trio with Chad and Jay-R, 2nd Runner-Up - December 16, 2006
18. Da Ya Think I'm Sexy? - Rod Stewart, medley and trio with Chad and Jay-R, 2nd Runner-Up - December 16, 2006
19. Simply Irresistible - Robert Palmer, medley and trio with Chad and Jay-R, 2nd Runner-Up - December 16, 2006
20. Habang May Buhay - Donna Cruz, duet with Irish,
  2nd Runner-Up - December 16, 2006
21. Nais Ko - Basil Valdez (Final Three Song), 2nd Runner-Up - December 16, 2006

Panky Trinidad (20, a passionate musician from Cebu)
Songs Performed

1. Sunshine - Chad Peralta, with Chad, Chai, Gemma, and Rosita
2. Behind Those Eyes - Panky Trinidad, with Chai, Geoff, Irish and Rosita
3. Isang Linggong Pag-ibig - Imelda Papin, with Geoff, Irish, Iya, Jay-R and Jun
4. No Touch - Rico J. Puno (Tagalog with Ilocano and Cebuano translation), with Chai, Davey, Geoff, Rosita and Yvan
5. Yugyugan Na - Pot, duet with Eman
6. Hard to Handle - Black Crowes
7. Karamay - Gabriel Jesse T. Guevarra, medley with Jay-R, Rosita and Yeng
8. Point of No Return -Zsazsa Padilla, medley with Irish
9. Bring Me to Life - Evanescence, medley with Eman and Yeng
10. Proud Mary - Creedence Clearwater Revival, medley with Chad and Yeng
11. Beep Beep - Juan Dela Cruz, medley with Chad and Joan
12. Santa Claus Is Coming to Town - Dolly Parton
13. Crazy - Aerosmith
14. T-R-O-U-B-L-E - Elvis Presley
15. Taralets - Imago, performance with Imago
16. Awit ng Kabataan - Rivermaya (Opening Act), trio with Irish and Yeng, Top 4 Finalist - December 16, 2006
17. Queen of the Night - Whitney Houston, medley and trio with Irish and Yeng, Top 4 Finalist - December 16, 2006
18. Respect - Aretha Franklin, medley and trio with Irish and Yeng, Top 4 Finalist - December 16, 2006
19. I'm Every Woman - Chaka Khan, medley and trio with Irish and Yeng, Top 4 Finalist - December 16, 2006
20. Lady Marmalade - Labelle, medley and trio with Irish and Yeng, Top 4 Finalist - December 16, 2006
21. Gemini - Sponge Cola, duet with Chad, Top 4 Finalist - December 16, 2006
22. We Will Rock You - Queen (Farewell Song), Top 4 Finalist - December 16, 2006

Irish Fullerton (23, a nursing student from California)
Songs Performed

1. Babalik Rin - Yvan Lambatan, with Jay-R, Kristoff, Oona and Yvan
2. Behind Those Eyes - Panky Trinidad, with Chai, Geoff, Panky and Rosita
3. Isang Linggong Pag-ibig - Imelda Papin, with Geoff, Iya, Jay-R, Jun and Panky
4. Magdalena - Freddie Aguilar (Tagalog with Italian translation), with Chad, Joan and Ronnie
5. I Finally Found Someone - Barbra Streisand and Bryan Adams, duet with Chad
6. Kailan Kaya - Sheryn Regis, medley with Chai, Jay-R, Ronnie and Rosita
7. You Moved Me - Elisette Blancaflor, medley with Chad, Chai and Joan
8. Larger than Life - Zsazsa Padilla, medley with Panky
9. Somewhere - West Side Story
10. I'll Never Love This Way Again - Dionne Warwick, medley with Joan and Michelle
11. Ang Himig Natin - Juan Dela Cruz, medley with Rosita and Yeng
12. O Holy Night - Mariah Carey
13. Over the Rainbow - Judy Garland
14. Hiram - Zsazsa Padilla
15. Ewan - Imago, performance with Imago
16. Awit ng Kabataan - Rivermaya (Opening Act), trio with Panky and Yeng, Top 5 Finalist - December 16, 2006
17. Queen of the Night - Whitney Houston, medley and trio with Panky and yeng, Top 5 Finalist - December 16, 2006
18. Respect - Aretha Franklin, medley and trio with Panky and Yeng, Top 5 Finalist - December 16, 2006
19. I'm Every Woman - Chaka Khan, medley and trio with Panky and Yeng, Top 5 Finalist - December 16, 2006
20. Lady Marmalade - Labelle, medley and trio with Panky and Yeng, Top 5 Finalist - December 16, 2006
21. Habang May Buhay - Donna Cruz, duet with Ronnie, Top 5 Finalist - December 16, 2006
22. Sana'y Maghintay Ang Walang Hanggan - Zsazsa Padilla (Farewell Song), Top 5 Finalist - December 16, 2006

Richard "Chad" Peralta (21, an IT consultant from Australia)
Songs Performed

1. Sunshine - Chad Peralta, with Chai, Gemma, Panky and Rosita
2. Hilot - Jay-R Siaboc, with Eman, Jay-R, Jun and Yvan
3. The Day You said Goodnight - Hale, with Michelle, RJ, Yeng and Yvan
4. Magdalena - Freddie Aguilar (Tagalog with Italian translation), with Irish, Joan and Ronnie
5. I Finally Found Someone - Barbra Streisand and Bryan Adams, duet with Irish
6. Bitiw - Sponge Cola, medley with RJ and Yvan
7. Krishna's Eyes - Edgardo P. Miraflor Jr., medley with Chai, Irish and Joan
8. Anak - Freddie Aguilar
9. Bed of Roses - Bon Jovi
10. Put Your Head on My Shoulder - Paul Anka, medley with Panky and Yeng
11. Laklak - Teeth, medley with Joan and Panky
12. Do They Know It's Christmas? - Band Aid
13. If Tomorrow Never Comes - Garth Brooks
14. With or Without You - U2
15. Stars - CallaLily, performance with CallaLily
16. Superhero - Rocksteddy, trio with Jay-R and Ronnie, Top 6 Finalist - December 16, 2006
17. Kiss - Prince and The Revolution, medley and trio with Jay-R and Ronnie, Top 6 Finalist - December 16, 2006
18. Da Ya Think I'm Sexy? - Rod Stewart, medley and trio with Jay-R and Ronnie, Top 6 Finalist - December 16, 2006
19. Simply Irresistible - Robert Palmer, medley and trio with Jay-R and Ronnie, Top 6 Finalist - December 16, 2006
20. Gemini - Sponge Cola, duet with Panky, Top 6 Finalist - December 16, 2006
21. Love Story - Francis Lai (Farewell Song), Top 6 Finalist - December 16, 2006

Rosita Bareng (25, an OFW from Dubai)
Songs Performed

1. Sunshine - Chad Peralta, with Chad, Chai, Gemma and Panky
2. Behind Those Eyes - Panky Trinidad, with Chai, Geoff, Irish and Panky
3. Tuwing Umuulan - Regine Velasquez
4. No Touch - Rico J. Puno (Tagalog with Ilocano and Cebuano translation), with Chai, Davey, Geoff, Panky and Yvan
5. Halik - Aegis
6. Bituing Walang Ningning - Sharon Cuneta, medley with Chai, Irish, Jay-R and Ronnie
7. Tanging Ikaw Lamang - Markel Cesar A. Luna, medley with Jay-R, Panky and Yeng
8. Sana'y Wala Nang Wakas - Sharon Cuneta
9. Total Eclipse of the Heart - Bonnie Tyler, medley with Davey and Joan
10. Bakit Ako Mahihiya - Didith Reyes
11. Bakit - Aegis, medley with Irish and Yeng
12. Christmas All Over the World - Sheena Easton
13. Basang-basa sa Ulan - Aegis
14. Ako ang Nasawi, Ako ang Nagwagi - Dulce
15. When I Met You - Barbie Almalbis, performance with Barbie Almalbis, Expelled - December 9, 2006
16. Hindi Ako Laruan - Imelda Papin (Farewell Song), Expelled - December 9, 2006

Yvan Lambatan (24, a father from Baguio)
Songs Performed

1. Babalik Rin - Yvan Lambatan, with Irish, Jay-R, Kristoff and Oona
2. Hilot - Jay-R Siaboc, with Chad, Eman, Jay-R and Jun
3. The Day You said Goodnight - Hale, with Chad, Michelle, RJ and Yeng
4. No Touch - Rico J. Puno (Tagalog with Ilocano and Cebuano translation), with Chai, Davey, Geoff, Panky and Rosita
5. Dahil Ikaw - True Faith
6. Tuloy pa Rin - Neocolours, medley with Chad and RJ
7. Pag Nandiyan Siya - Ernest Yvan Cruz Esguerra, medley with Davey and Eman
8. Eto Na Naman - Gary Valenciano, duet with Eman
9. Say You'll Never Go - Neocolours
10. Overjoyed - Stevie Wonder
11. Sandalan - 6 Cycle Mind
12. Pasko Na, Sinta Ko - Gary Valenciano
13. Alipin - Shamrock
14. Open Arms - Journey
15. Take My Hand - CallaLily, performance with CallaLily, Expelled - December 9, 2006
16. Iris - Goo Goo Dolls (Farewell Song), performance with CallaLily, Expelled - December 9, 2006

Eman Abatayo (22, an accountancy graduate from Iloilo)
Songs Performed

1. Miss Kita Pag Tuesday - RJ Jimenez, with Geoff, Iya, Michelle and RJ
2. Hilot - Jay-R Siaboc, with Chad, Jay-R, Jun and Yvan
3. Karaniwang Tao - Joey Ayala, with Chai, Davey, Joan and Ronnie
4. Arigato Tomodaci - Eman Abatayo, Jun Hirano and Jay-R Siaboc, with Jay-R, Kristoff and RJ (with Jun)
5. Yugyugan Na - Pot, duet with Panky
6. Daliri - Kjwan
7. Wishing Lampara - Mark Eduard de Mesa and Michael Sapico, medley with Davey and Yvan
8. Eto Na Naman - Gary Valenciano, duet with Yvan
9. Sometimes a Fantasy - Billy Joel, medley with Panky and Yeng
10. You Give Love a Bad Name - Bon Jovi
11. Tayo'y Mga Pinoy - Francis Magalona
12. Merry Christmas, Break na Tayo - Eman Abatayo
13. I'll Be - Edwin McCain
14. Higher - Creed, Expelled - December 2, 2006

Davey Langit (19, a guitar instructor from Baguio)
Songs Performed

1. Hawak Kamay - Yeng Constantino, with Joan, Jun, Ronnie and Yeng
2. Salamat Sa'Yo Ina - Ronnie Liang, with Gemma, Joan, Oona and Ronnie
3. Karaniwang Tao - Joey Ayala, with Chai, Eman, Joan and Ronnie
4. No Touch - Rico J. Puno (Tagalog with Ilocano and Cebuano translation), with Chai, Geoff, Panky, Rosita and Yvan
5. Maling Akala - Brownman Revival, duet with Kristoff
6. There is No Easy Way - James Ingram
7. Ako - Soc Villanueva, medley with Eman and Yvan
8. Mamang Kutsero - APO Hiking Society, duet with Chai
9. Kahit Ika'y Panaginip Lamang - Basil Valdez, medley with Joan and Rosita
10. Just The Way You Are - Billy Joel, medley with Jay-R
11. Jeepney - Sponge Cola, medley with Jay-R, Ronnie and Yvan
12. Miss Kita Kung Christmas - Sharon Cuneta
13. Spending My Life With You - Davey Langit, Expelled - November 25, 2006

Joan Jane Ilagan (20, a law student from Italy)
Songs Performed

1. Hawak Kamay - Yeng Constantino, with Davey, Jun, Ronnie and Yeng
2. Salamat Sa'Yo Ina - Ronnie Liang, with Davey, Gemma, Oona and Ronnie
3. Karaniwang Tao - Joey Ayala, with Chai, Davey, Eman and Ronnie
4. Magdalena - Freddie Aguilar (Tagalog with Italian translation), with Chad, Irish and Ronnie
5. Broken Vow - Lara Fabian
6. It's All Coming Back to Me Now - Celine Dion, medley with Iya and Michelle
7. Go With My Heart - Gino Torres, medley with Chad, Chai and Irish
8. Movie Fans - Maricel Soriano
9. One Sweet Day - Mariah Carey and Boyz II Men, medley with Davey and Rosita
10. All At Once - The Fray, medley with Irish and Michelle
11. Nosi Balasi - Sampaguita, medley with Chad and Panky
12. Silent Night - Mariah Carey - Expelled - November 18, 2006

Michelle Bond (24, a part-time singer from Amsterdam)
Songs Performed

1. Miss Kita Pag Tuesday - RJ Jimenez, with Eman, Geoff, Iya and RJ
2. Dinggin - Davey Langit, with Iya, Kristoff, RJ and Yeng
3. The Day You said Goodnight - Hale, with Chad, RJ, Yeng and Yvan
4. Mahal Kita, Walang Iba - Ogie Alcasid, medley with Oona and Yeng
5. Kailangan Mo, Kailangan Ko - Richard Tan and Bambi Bonus, trio with Oona and Ronnie
6. We Belong - Toni Gonzaga, medley with Iya and Joan
7. Don't Cry for Me Argentina - Madonna
8. Without You - Mariah Carey
9. Love Moves in Mysterious Ways - Julia Fordham
10. I Honestly Love You - Olivia Newton-John, medley with Irish and Joan, Expelled - November 5, 2006

Chai Fonacier (20, the vocalist of Balde ni Allan band from Cagayan de Oro)
Songs Performed

1. Sunshine - Chad Peralta, with Chad, Gemma, Panky and Rosita
2. Behind Those Eyes - Panky Trinidad, with Geoff, Irish, Panky and Rosita
3. Karaniwang Tao - Joey Ayala, with Davey, Eman, Joan and Ronnie
4. No Touch - Rico J. Puno (Tagalog with Ilocano and Cebuano translation), with Davey, Geoff, Panky, Rosita and Yvan
5. Anungan - Grace Nono
6. Kung Ako na Lang Sana - Bituin Escalante, medley with Irish, Jay-R, Ronnie and Rosita
7. Unfair - Michael Plaga Ong, medley with Chad, Irish and Joan
8. Mamang Kutsero - Apo Hiking Society, duet with Davey
9. Sino ang Baliw - Kuh Ledesma, medley with Jay-R and Ronnie
10. Get Here - Brenda Russell, Expelled - November 4, 2006

Iya Ginez (21, an SK Chairwoman from Pangasinan)
Songs Performed

1. Miss Kita Pag Tuesday - RJ Jimenez, with Eman, Geoff, Michelle and RJ
2. Dinggin - Davey Langit, with Kristoff, Michelle, RJ and Yeng
3. Isang Linggong Pag-ibig - Imelda Papin, with Geoff, Irish, Jay-R, Jun and Panky
4. Kahit Na - Ogie Alcasid
5. Nanliligaw, Naliligaw - Lloyd Umali and Ima Castro, duet with Jay-R
6. Stay - Carol Banawa, medley with Joan and Michelle
7. Minsan ang Minahal ay Ako - Celeste Legaspi
8. Ang Boyfriend Kong Baduy - Cinderella, medley with Jay-R
9. Sweet Love - Anita Baker, Expelled - October 28, 2006

Kristoff Abrenica (20, a grocery clerk from Canada)
Songs Performed

1. Babalik Rin - Yvan Lambatan, with Irish, Jay-R, Oona and Yvan
2. Dinggin - Davey Langit, with Iya, Michelle, RJ and Yeng
3. Kailangan Kita - Martin Nievera
4. Arigato Tomodaci - Eman Abatayo, Jun Hirano and Jay-R Siaboc, with Eman, Jay-R and RJ (with Jun)
5. Maling Akala - Brownman Revival, duet with Davey
6. Win - Brian McKnight
7. She's Out of My Life - Michael Jackson
8. Let Me - Kristoff Abrenica, Automatically Expelled - October 21, 2006

RJ Jimenez (22, a University of Santo Tomas graduate from Pasig)
Songs Performed

1. Miss Kita Pag Tuesday - RJ Jimenez, with Eman, Geoff, Iya and Michelle
2. Dinggin - Davey Langit, with Iya, Kristoff, Michelle and Yeng
3. The Day You said Goodnight - Hale, with Chad, Michelle, Yeng and Yvan
4. Arigato Tomodaci - Eman Abatayo, Jun Hirano and Jay-R Siaboc, with Eman, Jay-R and Kristoff (with Jun)
5. Ligaya - the Eraserheads, duet with Yeng
6. She Could Be - Corbin Bleu, medley with Chad and Yvan
7. 1000 Things - Jason Mraz, Expelled - October 14, 2006

Oona Barretto (23, a former pre-school teacher from Bukidnon)
Songs Performed

1. Babalik Rin - Yvan Lambatan, with Irish, Jay-R, Kristoff and Yvan
2. Salamat Sa'Yo Ina - Ronnie Liang, with Davey, Gemma, Joan and Ronnie
3. Paalam Na - Dingdong Avanzado
4. Sana Maulit Muli - Gary Valenciano, medley with Michelle and Yeng
5. Kailangan Mo, Kailangan Ko - Richard Tan and Bambi Bonus, trio with Michelle and Ronnie
6. Out Here on My Own - Irene Cara, Expelled - October 7, 2006

Geoff Taylor (20, a model from Cagayan Valley)
Songs Performed

1. Miss Kita Pag Tuesday - RJ Jimenez, with Eman, Iya, Michelle and RJ
2. Behind Those Eyes - Panky Trinidad, with Geoff, Irish, Panky and Rosita
3. Isang Linggong Pag-ibig - Imelda Papin, with Irish, Iya, Jay-R, Jun and Panky
4. No Touch - Rico J. Puno (Tagalog with Ilocano and Cebuano translation), with Chai, Davey, Panky, Rosita and Yvan
5. Ako'y Sa'yo Ika'y Akin - Iaxe, Expelled - September 30, 2006

Jun Hirano (平野 準, Hirano Jun; 18, a Japanese-Filipino student from Japan)
Songs Performed

1. Hawak Kamay - Yeng Constantino, with Davey, Jun, Ronnie and Yeng
2. Hilot - Jay-R Siaboc, with Chad, Eman, Jay-R and Yvan
3. Isang Linggong Pag-ibig - Imelda Papin, with Geoff, Irish, Iya, Jay-R and Panky
4. Sukiyaki - Kyu Sakamoto, Dropped Out - September 23, 2006

Gemma Fitzgerald (20, a medical administrative officer from Australia, member of Koolchx)
Songs Performed

1. Sunshine - Chad Peralta, with Chad, Chai, Panky and Rosita
2. Salamat Sa'Yo Ina - Ronnie Liang, with Davey, Joan, Oona and Ronnie
3. Ikaw - Regine Velasquez, Expelled - September 16, 2006

== Faculty ==
- Headmaster: Jim Paredes
- Dance Teacher: Maribeth Bichara
- Fitness Teacher: Gretchen Malalad
- Voice Teachers: Moy Ortiz, Annie Quintos, Cecile Bautista, Sweet Plantado
- Diction Teacher: Von Arroyo
- Performance Teacher: Malou de Guzman
- Media Performance Teacher: Joey Reyes
- Songwriting Teacher: Raimund Marasigan
- Belly Dance Teacher: Kat Fonacier
- Media Ethics Teacher: Boots Anson-Roa
- Technical Voice Teacher: Kitchie Molina (former juror of several PDA Performance Nights)

== Personalities who visited the academy ==
- Bamboo
- Barbie Almalbis
- Boy Abunda
- Callalily
- Ethel Booba
- Hale
- Imago
- Parokya ni Edgar
- Lea Salonga
- Luis Manzano
- Mig Ayesa
- Moonstar88
- Raimund Marasigan
- Sponge Cola
- Vilma Santos
- Orange and Lemons

== Performances inside the Academy ==
=== Week 1 and Week 2: Gala Performance Night ===
In Weeks 1 and 2, the show was called the 1st and 2nd Gala Performance Night, respectively. In both gala nights, the contestants were put into four groups and they sang the original compositions of seven of the contestants, and one of the NCR Dreamers. These were Yeng's "Hawak Kamay", Richard's "Sunshine", Yvan's "Babalik Rin", RJ's "Miss Kita Pag Tuesday", Davey's "Dinggin", Panky's "Behind Those Eyes", Jay-R's "Hilot" and Jenner Mallari's "Salamat Sa'Yo Ina".

=== Week 2: 1st Nomination Night ===
Three prominent people from the Philippines' music industry, termed the jurors, were invited to this week's show, as well as to the succeeding performance nights up to the present, to judge the performance of the contestants. In this show, the contestants they nominated for expulsion were Kristoff, Rosita, Oona, and Gemma.

=== Week 3: 1st Expulsion Night ===
This show had a different format from the Gala Performance Nights, and this format has been implemented ever since. The probationary students each had to give solo performances, while the contestants not on probation were put into groups of varying number and they either sing as a group or perform a medley. Gemma was the first expelled scholar from the Academy. Kristoff was saved by the viewers, Rosita was saved by the faculty and Oona was saved by her co-scholars winning 14 out of 18 votes. For the 1st Expulsion Night, the theme of the songs performed by the contestants not on probation was a crossing over of genres. The novelty song "Isang Linggong Pag-ibig" was given a Latin flavor. The folksong "Karaniwang Tao" was sung in an ethnic rock version, and Hale's song "The Day You Said Goodnight" was performed with a techno-alternative vibe.

=== Week 4: 2nd and 3rd Nomination Night ===
Week 4's Monday episode was the 2nd Nomination Night wherein Oona, Michelle, Yeng and Jun were nominated for expulsion. Week 4's Saturday show was called the 3rd Nomination Night instead of the 2nd Expulsion Night, because of Jun. He was not expelled because he opted to drop out from the academy. He was one of the four probationary students named in the 2nd Nomination Night, and his actions saved the other three nominees. The theme of the songs performed by the non-probationary seemed to coincide with Jun's departure, for the lyrics of their performance songs were translated to other languages and Filipino dialects. Freddie Aguilar's "Magdalena" was partly translated to Italian. "No Touch" was sung in Ilocano and Visayan. Eman and Jun's composition "Arigato Tomodachi" had some lines in Japanese. The coincidence is due to the fact that Jun did not develop a fluency in Tagalog during his stay in the Academy.

=== Week 5: 3rd Expulsion Night ===
Week 5's Saturday show was the 3rd Expulsion Night and in this episode, out of the 4 probationary contestants (Rosita, Chai, Yvan and Geoff), Geoff was the expelled student. Yvan was saved by the viewers, Rosita was saved by the faculty and Chai was saved by her co-contestants winning 11 out of 16 votes. The contestants not on probation sang in duets.

=== Week 6: 4th Probation and Expulsion Night ===
The Sunday night after the 3rd Expulsion Night came the 4th Probation Night wherein Kristoff, Oona, Davey and Yeng were named the probationary contestants. For the 4th Expulsion Night, Oona was the expelled student. Kristoff was saved by the viewers, Yeng was saved by the faculty and Davey was saved by his co-contestants winning 10 out of 15 votes. The non-nominees sang popular songs in a medley format.

=== Week 7: 5th Probation and Expulsion Night ===
After the 4th Expulsion Night came the 5th Probation Night on Sunday. It was Kristoff, Michelle, Iya and RJ who were nominated. On the 5th Expulsion Night, RJ was the expelled student. Kristoff was saved by the viewers, Iya was saved by the faculty and Michelle was saved by her co-contestants winning 12 out of 14 votes. Those not in probation sang some of the winning songs of the Dream Songwriting Competition. The songs performed were "Pag Nandiyan Siya" by Ernest Yvan Cruz Esguerra, "Wishing Lampara" by Mark Eduard de Mesa and Michael Sapico, "Ako" by Soc Villanueva, "Unfair" by Michael Plaga Ong, "Krishna's Eyes" by Edgardo P. Miraflor Jr., "You Moved Me" by Elisette Blancaflor, "Go with My Heart" by Gino Torres, "May Tama Ako" by Rickenson Calubad, "Tanging Ikaw Lamang" by Markel Cesar A. Luna, "Karamay" by Gabriel Jesse T. Guevarra, and "Pangarap Lang" by Alvin K. Gonzales.

=== Week 8: 6th Probation and Expulsion Night ===
The 6th Expulsion Night took place on week 8, and Kristoff was the expelled student. He was automatically expelled because he received one of the four low grades from the jurors of the performances that week. His scores made him a probationary student for the following week's expulsion night, and it would have been his fifth time of being on probation. His automatic expulsion was due to an additional rule implemented by the academy on week 7. The new rule stated that contestants who get nominated five times will be automatically expelled so that the academy can maintain its standard of excellence.

=== Week 9: Midterm Exams, 7th Probation and Expulsion Night ===
The probationary contestants were Yvan, Iya, Irish and Michelle. During this week, the contestants faced their midterm exams. They were tested by the academy's faculty on their knowledge in musical theories, their media and dance performances, their fitness, and their diction. On the expulsion night, Iya was the expelled student. Giving the best in her rendition of Anita Baker's Sweet Love, some of the audiences were shocked in her expulsion. Irish was saved by the viewers, Yvan was saved by the faculty and Michelle was saved by her co-contestants winning 9 out of 12 votes.

=== Week 10: 8th Probation and Expulsion Night ===
Last 7th Expulsion Night, Rosita was automatically put on probation because she got the lowest score in the midterm exams (having 68%). During the 8th Probation Night, Eman, Chai, and Ronnie got the lowest marks from the jurors and they completed the list of four contestants on probationary status. This week was the start of the 2nd semester inside the Academy. At the 8th Expulsion Night, Chai was the expelled student. Ronnie was saved by the viewers, Rosita was saved by the faculty and Eman was saved by his co-contestants winning 6 out of 11 votes. All the contestants sang classics from world icons Stevie Wonder, Dionne Warwick, Billy Joel, among others, as well as Filipino hitmakers like Didith Reyes and Rey Valera.

=== Week 11: 9th and 10th Probation Night ===
On the 9th Probation Night, Michelle was automatically expelled. It was her fifth time being on probation, for she received one of the four low grades from the jurors of the 8th Expulsion Night. As with Kristoff's case, her automatic expulsion was due to the five-probation rule. Her expulsion ensured the safety of the three other probationary students, namely Jay-R, Davey, and Irish. Because of Michelle's exit, the Performance Night on Saturday became the 10th Probation Night. In this episode, all finalists sang Filipino rock songs. The finalists who were put on probation were Joan, Jay-R, Davey, and Irish. The other 7 finalists who were not nominated were put on the Headmaster's List and have been guaranteed spots in the final 10.

=== Week 12: 10th Expulsion Night ===
At the beginning of the episode, 7 finalists were already confirmed to be in the Headmaster's List. The finalists sang their own renditions of classical and modern Christmas songs. Joan was expelled from the Academy, as she got only 4 save votes from her co-finalists. Jay-R was saved by viewer's votes, Irish was saved by the faculty and Davey got the 5 save votes from his co-finalists.

=== Week 13: 11th Probation and Expulsion Night ===
Davey was expelled from the academy, he got the lowest votes from the viewers.

=== Week 14: 12th Expulsion Night ===
Eman was expelled from the academy. There will be no Probation nights starting this week. The new rule is that, the finalists who has the lowest number of votes next expulsion night will be expelled. The viewers have the fate of the finalists till this day on. The viewers will decide who will be at the Honors list of 6.

=== Week 15: Final Expulsion Night ===
The two finalists, who has the lowest number of votes this week, are Yvan and Rosita. They are the ones who were expelled from the academy. The six finalists left are Jay-R, Yeng, Panky, Irish, Ronnie, and Chad. They are the one who will face-off at the Grand Dream Night.

=== Week 16: Preparations for the Grand Dream Night ===
The finalists prepared themselves for their biggest night ever. They were busy all week long. Doing rehearsals for their performances, for both dance and songs. Also they had a special taping for the ABS-CBN Christmas special. At the same time they had a chance to meet their own idols and fans of their own.

== Finale: Grand Dream Night ==
After sixteen weeks of training, six finalists remained. The Pinoy Dream Academy culminated with the "Grand Dream Night", which will proclaim the "Grand Star Dreamer", held on December 16, 2006, at the Araneta Coliseum packed with thousands of fans and supporters.

After the honor list of six performed along with guest singers, voting was temporarily closed to find out who made it in the top three. Panky, Chad, and Irish rounded out the bottom three while Ronnie, Jay-R, and Yeng had the highest number of votes. The top three faced off each other with solo performances.

Garnering 558,912 votes or 29.9% of the total votes, Ronnie was declared as Pinoy Dream Academy's second runner-up. Yeng won the competition becoming the first "Grand Star Dreamer" getting a total of 697,648 votes (37.32%) placing Jay-R as the first runner-up with 612,767 votes (32.77%). The total number of votes of the top 6 from December 2–16, 2006 was 2,956,362 votes. During the finale, ABS-CBN launched their new Philippine National Anthem music video that was aired on the network together with Studio 23 during Sign-on and sign-off until June 12, 2011. The 2006 national anthem MTV is still played on radio via DZMM Radyo Patrol 630, and MOR 101.9.

== Prizes ==
All finalists received Belgian Waffle Mallcarts. The runners-up received an additional motorcycle from Suzuki, a brand new condominium unit in Chateau Valenzuela from Globe Asiatique, cash prizes from Fitrum (a vitamin supplement, P200,000 for the third placer and P500,000 for the second placer) and a recording contract.

The Grand Star Dreamer, Yeng Constantino, received a brand-new Suzuki Swift, a condo unit at G.A. Towers, a 60-inch SXRD Sony Bravia, a Touch music video unit, a Belgian Waffle dine-in franchise, a recording contract, and 1 million pesos from Fitrum.

== Scholars' Grades ==
	1	2	3	4	5	6	7	8	9	10	11	12	Avg.
	Sep 9	Sep 18	Sep 23	Oct 1	Oct 8	Oct 14	Oct 21	Oct 28	Nov 4	Nov 11	Nov 18	Nov 25	Avg.
Yeng	9.00	7.33	8.00	6.83	7.53	9.50	8.50	8.50	8.32	7.93	7.27	9.06	8.15
Jay-R	8.00	7.66	8.00	7.66	8.16	8.00	8.20	8.10	7.92	6.56	8.55	8.76	7.96
Ronnie	7.66	7.66	7.55	7.66	9.33	9.00	8.30	7.00	8.23	7.70	7.66	8.22	8.00
Panky	8.66	7.66	7.16	10.00	9.50	8.30	7.80	7.70	8.90	9.00	8.99	8.06	8.48
Irish	7.50	8.00	8.00	8.33	9.30	9.16	7.30	8.70	7.83	6.13	8.27	8.28	8.07
Chad	6.73	7.66	7.33	7.66	8.90	7.00	9.30	8.00	8.15	8.27	8.93	8.38	8.03
Rosita	5.33	8.16	5.33	9.00	7.66	4.66	8.50	8.60	8.05	8.23	7.93	8.54	7.50
Yvan	7.30	8.66	6.66	9.50	9.30	9.30	7.20	9.80	8.97	8.13	8.65	9.02	8.54
Eman	6.83	7.66	8.00	10.00	8.66	8.00	7.80	7.20	9.02	7.50	8.49	8.08	8.02
Davey	8.6	7.66	7.66	6.00	7.86	9.10	7.80	7.70	7.52	6.90	8.01		7.72
Joan	8.33	7.66	7.00	9.16	8.06	8.60	8.30	8.50	8.98	7.40			8.20
Michelle	6.66	7.33	7.55	7.50	6.66	6.50	6.90	7.40	7.35				7.09
Chai	7.00	8.66	6.66	7.50	7.63	8.00	8.30	7.10					7.61
Iya	8.00	7.66	8.16	8.16	7.03	8.10	7.60						7.82
Kristoff	6.33	7.66	7.00	5.66	7.00	4.83	7.10						6.51
RJ	7.00	7.66	7.66	7.33	7.26	7.80							7.45
Oona	5.33	7.00	7.16	7.00									6.62
Geoff	8.50	7.66	6.83										7.66
Jun	6.83	5.66											6.25
Gemma	6.33												6.33

Grades in RED indicate that the scholar is on probationary status.
Grades in DARK GREEN indicate that the contestant was the Star Scholar of the week.
Grades in YELLOW GREEN indicate that the scholar received the highest grade for the week, but was not the Star Scholar.
Grades highlighted in BLACK indicate that the scholar's grade was not counted for the organization's grade and their average grade.

== Expulsion Nights ==
The four scholars with the lowest scores of the Gala Night will be put on probation. These four scholars will be voted by the viewing public from the said Gala Night until the next Gala Night. The scholar with the highest text votes will be saved. Among the three remaining probationary scholars, the mentors will be choosing the scholar to save. The remaining two probationary scholars will then be voted by the scholars and the scholar with the lower number of votes from the scholars is expelled from the Academy.

The Number indicated in the first row are the Gala Nights wherein the scholar indicated in the last row was expelled. There were no probationary scholars during the 1st Gala Night. The first set of Probationary scholars were announced during the 2nd Gala Night and the first expulsion happened in the 3rd Gala Night. In the 14th Gala Night, there was no probation as the top 8 scholars were voted by the viewing public. The two scholars with the lowest vote turn-out were expelled from the Academy in the 15th Gala Night. Therefore, the 15th Gala Night was just a Gala Night for the expulsion of the last two scholars and the announcement of the Honor List of 6.

Gala Night	3rd	4th	5th	6th	7th	8th^{5}	9th	10th	11th^{7}	12th	13th^{9}	14th	15th^{10}	Grand Dream Night	
Star Scholar	None	Iya	Joan	Panky; Eman; 10.00	Ronnie^{3} 9.33	Yeng; 9.50	Richard; 9.30	Yvan; 9.80	Eman; 9.02	Panky; 9.00	Panky; 8.99	Yeng; 9.06	None	None	
On Probation	Kristoff; 6.33; Rosita; 5.33; Oona; 5.33; Gemma; 6.33	Oona; 7.00; Michelle; 7.33; Yeng; 7.33; Jun; 5.66	Rosita; 5.33; Chai; 6.66; Yvan; 6.66; Geoff; 6.83	Kristoff; 5.66; Oona; 7.00; Yeng; 6.83; Davey; 6.00	Kristoff; 7.00; Michelle; 6.66; Iya; 7.03; RJ; 7.26	Kristoff; 4.83; Rosita; 4.66; Michelle; 6.50; Richard; 7.00	Michelle; 6.90; Irish; 7.30; Iya; 7.60; Yvan; 7.20	Eman; 7.20; Rosita^{6} Chai; 7.10; Ronnie; 7.00	Michelle; 7.35; Irish; 7.83; Davey; 7.70; Jay-R; 8.10	Irish; 6.13; Joan; 7.40; Davey; 6.90; Jay-R; 6.56	Yeng; 7.27; Rosita^{8} 7.93; Davey; 8.01; Ronnie; 7.66	Eman; 8.08; Irish; 8.28; Ronnie; 8.22; Panky; 8.06	Open Voting		
Viewer's Choice	Kristoff; 53.51%	-	Yvan; 29.47%	Kristoff; 47.63%	Kristoff; 35.90%	Richard^{4} 39.21%	Irish; 34.62%	Ronnie; 40.78%	-	Jay-R; 44.98%	Yeng; Ronnie; Rosita	Ronnie; Irish; Panky	Irish; Jay-R; Panky; Richard; Ronnie; Yeng	Jay-R; Ronnie; Yeng	Yeng; 37.32%
Percentage Breakdown	17.46% 17.39% 11.64%	-	28.13% 25.21% 17.19%	33.03% 12.76% 6.58%	26.80% 25.23% 12.07%		29.50% 28.29% 7.59%	30.24% 23.46% 5.52%	-	26.53% 18.43% 10.06%	38.89% 27.56% 21.18%	31.90% 24.01% 22.89%		18.70% 19.80% 22.11%	-
Faculty's Choice	Rosita	-	Rosita	Yeng	Iya	-	Yvan	Rosita	-	Irish	-	-	-	-	-
Last Two Nominees	Oona; Gemma	None	Chai; Geoff	Oona; Davey	Michelle; RJ	None	Iya; Michelle	Eman; Chai	None	Joan; Davey	Davey; Rosita	Eman; Panky	-	-	-
Yeng	Oona	-	Chai	Oona	RJ	-	Michelle	Chai	-	Davey	-	-	-	-	Winner
Jay-R	Oona	-	Chai	Davey	Michelle	-	Iya	Eman	-	Davey	-	-	-	-	2nd placer
Ronnie	Oona	-	Geoff	Davey	Michelle	-	Michelle	Eman	-	Davey	-	-	-	-	3rd placer
Panky	Oona	-	Chai	Oona	Michelle	-	Iya	Chai	-	Davey	-	-	-	-	Finalist
Irish	Oona	-	Chai	Davey	Michelle	-	Michelle	Eman	-	Joan	-	-	-	-	Finalist
Richard	Gemma	-	Geoff	Davey	Michelle	-	Michelle	Eman	-	Joan	-	-	-	-	Finalist
Rosita	Oona	-	Geoff	Oona	Michelle	-	Michelle	Chai	-	Joan	-	-	-	Expelled	
Yvan	Oona	-	Chai	Davey	Michelle	-	Michelle	Eman	-	Davey	-	-	-	Expelled	
Eman	Oona	-	Chai	Davey	Michelle	-	Iya	Exempt	-	Joan	-	-	Expelled		
Davey	Oona	-	Chai	Exempt	Michelle	-	Michelle	Chai	-	Exempt	-	Expelled			
Joan	Gemma	-	Geoff	Davey	Michelle	-	Michelle	Eman	-	Exempt	Expelled				
Michelle	Gemma	-	Geoff	Davey	Exempt	-	Exempt	Chai	-	Automatically Expelled					
Chai	Oona	-	Exempt	Davey	RJ	-	Michelle	Exempt	Expelled						
Iya	Oona	-	Chai	Oona	Michelle	-	Exempt	Expelled							
Kristoff	Gemma	-	Chai	Davey	Michelle	-	Automatically Expelled								
RJ	Oona	-	Chai	Oona	Exempt	Expelled									
Oona	Exempt	-	Chai	Exempt	Expelled										
Geoff	Oona	-	Exempt	Expelled											
Jun	Oona	-	Dropped Out												
Gemma	Exempt	Expelled													
Expelled ^{1}	Gemma; 4 of 18 votes	Jun^{2}	Geoff; 5 of 16 votes	Oona; 5 of 15 votes	RJ; 2 of 14 votes	Kristoff	Iya; 3 of 12 votes	Chai; 5 of 11 votes	Michelle	Joan; 4 of 9 votes	Davey; 12.7%	Eman; 21.20%	Rosita; Yvan	Panky; 15.27% Irish; 13.66% Chad; 10.43% (out of 6)	Jay-R; 32.77% Ronnie; 29.90% (out of 3)

^Note 1: The finalists cast votes to save one of the last two nominees. The nominee who got the fewer number of votes would be expelled.
^Note 2: Jun opted to leave the Academy because of loneliness, further worsened by his inability to speak English and Filipino. He made his exit on September 24, with his last gala night on September 23. That night was supposedly the 2nd Expulsion Night, but because of Jun's exit, it became the 3rd Nomination Night.
^Note 3: Panky was this week's star scholar as she got the highest grade of 9.50 for the week. However, since she was the star scholar the previous week, Ronnie was awarded the distinction instead as he got the second-highest grade of 9.33. This was done to give other finalists a chance to become the star scholar for the week.
^Note 4: Richard was the Viewer's Choice for this week, as announced by the hosts at the end of the episode. However, the support he got from the voters did not have any bearing with the outcome of the expulsion that night.
^Note 5: Kristoff was automatically expelled because he received one of the four low grades from the jurors. His low grades made him one of the probationary students for the following week, and it would have been his fifth time of being on probation, with a score of 7.10. His expulsion was due to a new rule implemented by the academy, which states that a scholar is automatically expelled when he/she receives a fifth nomination.
^Note 6: Rosita was automatically put on probation because she got the lowest grade in the midterm exams. The other three probationary students were determined based on their performances in the gala night.
^Note 7: Michelle was automatically expelled during the 9th Probation Night because she received one of the four low grades from the jurors of the 8th Expulsion Night. This ensured the safety of the three other probationary students who were named in that episode.
^Note 8: Although this was Rosita's fifth nomination, her four previous nominations were disregarded as she was finally part of the top ten, or the Headmaster's List. The same can be said with the rest of the top ten.
^Note 9: Faculty's choice and scholar voting were ruled out for the 11th, and 12th Expulsion Nights. The probationary scholar with the fewest viewer votes was declared the expelled scholar.
^Note 10: In preparation for the Grand Dream Night, two finalists who got the two lowest viewer votes were expelled this week. Meanwhile, the viewer votes for the six remaining finalists in the academy were carried over to the tally of the votes they need to be declared winner on the Grand Dream Night.

Preceded by None	Pinoy Dream Academy	Succeeded by Season 2
