= Paasa (T.A.N.G.A.) =

Single by Yeng Constantino

from the album Yeng 10: 10 Years of Yeng Constantino
- Released: September 1, 2016
- Recorded: 2016
- Genre: Pop rock
- Length: 3:59
- Label: ABS-CBN Film Productions, Inc.
- Songwriter: Yeng Constantino
- Producers: Ria Villena-Osorio; Jonathan Manalo

Music video
- "Paasa (T.A.N.G.A)" on YouTube

"Paasa (T.A.N.G.A.)" is a single by Filipino singer and composer Yeng Constantino. The song was originally a short impromptu song composed and performed by Yeng during her first ever digital concert. The song was released by Star Music on September 1, 2016. Its official lyric and music videos were uploaded to YouTube on September 1, 2016 and September 24, 2016 respectively. The song eventually became part of Constantino's compilation album entitled Yeng 10: 10 Years of Yeng Constantino. T.A.N.G.A. is not an acronym, actually, it came from the Tagalog word tanga which means fool.

== Track listing ==
Digital download
No.	Title	Length
1.	"Paasa (T.A.N.G.A.)"	3:59

== Credits and personnel ==
Credits adapted from YouTube.

- Music and lyrics: Yeng Constantino
- Publisher: Star Music
- Arrangement: Ria Villena-Osorio
- Drums: Lawrence Nolan
- Bass: Karel Honasan
- Vocal arrangement: Jonathan Manalo
- Back-up vocals: Chir Cataran
- Mixed and Mastered by: Dante Tañedo
- Producer: Ria Villena-Osorio and Jonathan Manalo

== Chart performance ==
Chart	Peak position
Philippines (Philippine Hot 100)	94
Philippines (Philippine Top 20)	8

== See also ==
- Yeng Constantino discography
