= Salamat (album) =

Studio album by Yeng Constantino
- Released: January 19, 2007
- Recorded: 2006
- Genres: Pinoy rock; Acoustic
- Length: 43:57
- Label: Star Music
- Producer: Dream Big Productions

Yeng Constantino chronology
Salamat (2007)	Journey (2008)

Singles from Salamat
- 1. "Hawak Kamay" Released: September 2006; 2. "Salamat" Released: December 2006; 3. "If We Fall In Love" Released: January 2007; 4. "Pangarap Lang" Released: February 2007; 5. "Cool Off" Released: April 2007; 6. "Time In" Released: July 2007

Salamat is the debut studio album of the Filipina singer-songwriter Yeng Constantino. It was released on January 19, 2007, through Dream Big Productions and Star Music. It reached its Gold status in February of the same year and reached 3× Platinum with sales of 90,000 copies. The album has five number ones, the only female artist in the Philippines with the most number one hits in 2007. And the album produce six top ten hits.

The album has 10 tracks. 7 were originally composed by Yeng, 2 were written by her co-scholars in Pinoy Dream Academy and one is a rendition of Freddie Aguilar's OPM classic, "Bulag, Pipi at Bingi". It was followed by her second album titled "Journey". It was the best selling Filipino album of 2007.

== Track listing ==
1. "Salamat" (Constantino) - 4:50
2. "Away Bati" (Constantino) - 3:41
3. "Cool Off" (Davey Langit) - 5:07
4. "Time In" (Davey Langit) - 4:29
5. "Bulag, Pipi at Bingi" (Snaffu Rigor) - 4:47
6. "Just Cant Say" (Constantino) - 4:11
7. "Awit ng Pangarap" (Constantino) - 5:22
8. "If We Fall In Love" (RJ Jimenez) - 4:30
9. "Pangarap Lang" (Alvin Gonzales) - 4:06
10. "Hawak Kamay" (Constantino) - 4:20

== Singles ==
- "Hawak Kamay" was used as the Official Theme Song for the 2006 blockbuster Movie: Kasal, Kasali, Kasalo starring Judy Ann Santos & Ryan Agoncillo, where it won the Best Theme Song. It was also used for DepEd's advocacy to improve teaching in public schools.
- "Salamat" was Constantino's debut single, and it was written by her. To date the other uploaded lyrics of "Salamat" on YouTube reached over 8,000,000 views. This was used as she was named the first "Grand Star Dreamer" in Pinoy Dream Academy Season 1. In 2016, this song had its remake with collaborations from fellow Star Music artists Janella Salvador, Ylona Garcia, Bailey May, Angeline Quinto, Erik Santos, Kaye Cal, Marion Aunor, Daryl Ong, Bugoy Drilon, Liezel Garcia, Jovit Baldivino, Sue Ramirez, Inigo Pascual, Michael Pangilinan, Jed Madela, Morissette Amon, Klarisse De Guzman, Jamie Rivera, Jolina Magdangal, Juris, Vina Morales, Jona, Migz & Maya, Gloc-9, KZ Tandingan, Piolo Pascual, Kim Chiu, Xian Lim, Enchong Dee, Tim Pavino, Alex Gonzaga, Maris Racal, Enrique Gil, Kathryn Bernardo, Daniel Padilla and Vice Ganda.
- "If We Fall In Love", features the vocals of Rj Jimenez . It was used as sub-theme for the Korean drama Princess Hours when it aired on ABS-CBN.
- "Pangarap Lang" was the fourth single from this album, which was composed by Alvin Gonzales.
- "Cool Off" was released as the fifth single, the song is all about a couple who undergoes an emotional sensation or be in a particular state of mind. To date the music video of "Cool Off" reached 7,000,000 million views on YouTube with the official video and the other uploaded videos.
- "Time In" a pop rock song featuring the group Cebalo, composed of her fellow scholars in Pinoy Dream Academy. It was used as the official Theme Song for the Fantaserye Komiks Presents: Varga were parts of the lyrics are changed. The song also played inside Big Brother house in Finland during the time when a Filipina housemate Cathy Remperas swapped with Finn Kätlin Laas. In 2010 the song used in the movie Paano Na Kaya. The song was very popular on radios in the Philippines. To date the music video have 3,000,000 million views on YouTube with the official video and the non-official video.

== Commercial use ==
Four songs from this album was used as titles for Your Song episodes it was Cool Off, Pangarap Lang, Salamat, and If We Fall In Love featuring Rj Jimenez.

Four songs from this album was used for the 2021 iQiyi original series Saying Goodbye: "Time In," "Hawak Kamay," "Cool Off," and a rendition of "If We Fall In Love" performed by Angela Ken.

== Chart performance ==
Chart (2007)	Peak position
PH Albums Chart	1

"Salamat" debuted at no. 2 and stayed at this position the following week and dropped at no. 3 the following next 2 weeks. then it climbed up at no. 1 on April 15, 2007. It stayed the Top 10 Albums for almost 9 months.

== Certification ==
Salamat received its Gold Status 2 weeks after its release, followed by a Platinum Certification a few weeks after, until a Double Platinum later that year.

Region	Certification	Certified units/sales
Philippines (PARI)	2× Platinum	60,000^{*}
^{*} Sales figures based on certification alone.

== Awards and recognition ==
2008

- Awit Awards 2008: "Best Album of the year" - "Salamat"
- Awit Awards 2008: "Best inspirational/religious song" - "Salamat"
- Awit Awards 2008: "Best-selling album of the year" - "Salamat"
- Awit Awards 2008: "People's Choice Favorite Song of the Year" - "Salamat"
- Awit Awards 2008: "People's Choice FAvorite Music Video" - "Time-In"

2007

- Best Theme Song (Kasal Kasali Kasalo's "Hawak Kamay"): 32nd Metro Manila Film Festival
- Most Promising Female Recording/Concert Artist: 2006 Box Office Entertainment Awards.
- Best New Female Singer: Guillermo Mendoza Memorial Awards
- Female Artist Awardee: ASAP '07 24K Awards
- Pop Movie Theme Song (Kasal Kasali Kasalo's "Hawak Kamay"): ASAP Pop Viewer's Choice Awards 2007
- Pop Music Video ("Time In"): ASAP Pop Viewer's Choice Awards 2007
- Compilation Awardee ("Nagmamahal Kapamilya Album"): 3rd ASAP Platinum Circle Awards
- Female Awardee ("Salamat"): 3rd ASAP Platinum Circle Awards
- Favorite New Artist: 1st OPM Songhits 2007 Awards
- Best Theme Song (Kasal Kasali Kasalo's "Hawak Kamay"): 55th FAMAS Awards 2007
- Breakthrough Artist: 1st OPM Songhits Awards 2007
- Hitmaker Of The Year: Yeng Constantino (7 hit songs for the year 2007): 1st Megamixx Radio Music Awards (Guam)
- Most Popular Song by a Duo ("If we fall in love" with RJ Jimenez): 2nd IFM Pinoy Music Awards
- Extremely Requested Videoke Song ("Hawak Kamay"): 2nd IFM Pinoy Music Awards
