= Ikaw (song) =

2014 single by Yeng Constantino

Single by Yeng Constantino

from the album All About Love
- Released: August 23, 2014
- Recorded: 2014
- Genre: Pop
- Length: 4:44
- Label: Star Music
- Songwriter: Yeng Constantino
- Producers: Ria Villena-Osorio; Yeng Constantino; Jonathan Manalo

Yeng Constantino singles chronology
"Josephine" (2013)	"Ikaw" (2014)	"What's Up Ahead" (2014)

Music video
- "Ikaw" on YouTube

"Ikaw" ("You") is a song written and recorded by Filipino singer-songwriter Yeng Constantino, released as the lead single from her album All About Love. The song became the most played OPM song of 2014 and as of 2017 was the second most viewed music video by a Filipino female artist on YouTube with over 100 million views as of June 2020, behind Sarah Geronimo's "Tala".

== Background and composition ==
The song was written by Constantino with vocal production and arrangement by Jonathan Manalo, and musical arrangement by Ria Villena-Osorio. It was produced by Villena-Osorio, Constantino, Manalo, Champ Lui Pio, and Tim Mejia and released under Star Music Philippines.

== Music video ==
The official music video was released on August 23, 2014. It served as the unofficial prenuptial video of Constantino and then fiancé Yan Asuncion. It was directed by Cristhian Escolano.

== Live performances ==
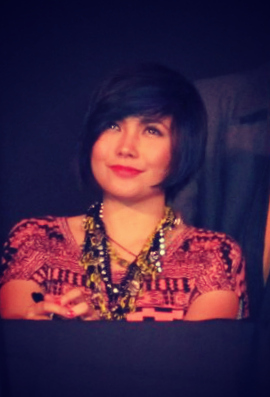
Yeng Constantino at her concert in Calgary, Alberta in 2011.

Constantino performed the song on ASAP with Yan Asuncion on December 7, 2014. She also performed the song on the Wish 107.5 bus on April 4, 2015 and on Net 25's Letters and Music in February 2016.

== Chart position ==
On June 12, 2017, the official Billboard Philippines charts were launched. "Ikaw" debuted at number 4 on the Catalog Charts, a chart for local songs that were released for over three years in the Philippines but still generated sales and streaming activity data.

== 2021 re-recording & 2024 remastered version ==
Constantino re-recorded the song to become the official soundtrack of the film of the same name starring Janine Gutierrez, Pepe Herrera and Pilita Corrales. It was released on 12 November 2021.

In October 2024, Constantino released another rerecording of the song titled "Ikaw (2024 Remastered Version)" as part of its 10th-year anniversary.

== Awards and nominations ==
The song won the Song of the Year award at both the PMPC Star Awards for Music and the Awit Awards.

Year	Awards ceremony	Award	Results
2015	PMPC Star Awards for Music	Song of the Year	Won
2015	PMPC Star Awards for Music	Best Music Video	Nominated
2015	Myx Music Awards	Favorite Music Video	Nominated
2015	Myx Music Awards	Favorite Mellow Video	Nominated
2015	Awit Awards	Song of the Year	Won
2015	Awit Awards	Best Ballad Recording	Nominated

== Cover versions ==
Daryl Ong recorded a cover of the song which was later used in the teleserye FPJ's Ang Probinsyano.

Korean singer Yohan Hwang covered the song in Korean entitled "Neoege (너에게)" for the Philippine broadcast of the Korean drama series Love in the Moonlight.
