= Hawak Kamay =

Single by Yeng Constantino

from the album Salamat
- Released: 2006
- Recorded: 2006
- Genre: Acoustic folk, pop rock
- Length: 4:20
- Label: Star Music
- Songwriter: Yeng Constantino
- Producer: Dream Big Productions

Yeng Constantino singles chronology
"Hawak Kamay" (2006)	"Pangarap Lang" (2006)

Audio Video
- "Hawak Kamay" on YouTube

"Hawak Kamay" (lit. 'Holding Hands') is a song by Filipina singer-songwriter Yeng Constantino, the winner of the ABS-CBN TV program Pinoy Dream Academy in 2006. Solely written by Constantino, the song is about a cousin with whom she developed a deep friendship. In 2006, it won the Best Theme Song at the 32nd Metro Manila Film Festival. The song is also used in the 2011 film, Won't Last a Day Without You.

== Background and writing ==
Constantino wrote "Hawak Kamay" at age 14, inspired by a cousin who had left their hometown to live away from her. She performed the song for the first time live on Pinoy Dream Academy. During that time, she sang the song along with her fellow contestants Ronnie Liang, Davey Langit, Joan Ilagan and Jun Hirano. Following public demand, the song was released by Star Music. The song is the most successful single to date in Constantino's career.

== Versions ==
- 1st version - used in the Pinoy Dream Academy days. This version appears on Pinoy Dream Academy Originals Vol. 1, and is also the more recognizable version.
- 2nd version - used as the theme song for the movie Kasal, Kasali, Kasalo.
- 3rd version - made for her debut album, Salamat.
- 4th version - used in the horror film Cinco, in the segment Braso (Arm) when Sam Concepcion, AJ Perez and Robi Domingo each other
- 5th version - used in the guitar scene of Joey de Leon in the film Won't Last a Day Without You.
- 6th version - used in the karaoke scene in the horror film The Healing.
- 7th version - used in the singing scene in the Wansapanataym episode, Holly and Mau.
- Other versions we're used in commercials such as Perla Detergent Soap and McDonalds.

== Cover versions ==
- Sharlene San Pedro of Goin' Bulilit covered the song alongside actor Nash Aguas.
- In August 2011, David DiMuzio made and uploaded an English version cover "I'm By Your Side" on YouTube.
- On January 19, 2023, South Korean-Chinese boyband EXO performed an acoustic cover on Dream K-Pop Fantasy Concert at SM Mall of Asia Arena.
- On October 2, 2013, Xela Padua used the song on Eat Bulaga!'s "Ka-Voice ni Idol" during wild card week.
- In June 2014, Filipino actor and singer Piolo Pascual covered the song for Hawak Kamay.
- On February 26th and 27th, 2024, The Tabernacle Choir at Temple Square performed the song during their world tour in the Philippines at the SM Mall of Asia Arena.

== Award nominations ==
- Best Theme Song (Kasal Kasali Kasalo's "Hawak Kamay"): 32nd Metro Manila Film Festival
- Pop Movie Theme Song (Kasal Kasali Kasalo's "Hawak Kamay"): ASAP Pop Viewer's Choice Awards 2007
- Best Theme Song (Kasal Kasali Kasalo's "Hawak Kamay"): 55th FAMAS Awards 2007
- Extremely Requested Videoke Song ("Hawak Kamay"): 2nd IFM Pinoy Music Awards

== Live performances ==
Constantino first performed this song on Pinoy Dream Academy, together with her fellow contestants Ronnie Liang, Davey Langit, Joan Ilagan and Jun Hirano. She has performed the song several times on the ABS-CBN weekend variety show ASAP, which airs on Sundays.

The song was performed by Constantino herself on the first anniversary of the ULTRA Stampede during the second anniversary of show Wowowee as the show chose not to celebrate its second anniversary out of respect for the disaster's victims and their kin.

In September 2009, she performed the song on Umagang Kay Ganda as a tribute for the victims of Typhoon Ondoy (international name Ketsana). In August 2011, she performed a medley of "Hawak Kamay" and her song "Lapit" on Eat Bulaga!. On December 9, 2011, Constantino and American singer/songwriter David DiMuzio performed a duet of "Hawak Kamay (I'm By Your Side)" in Taglish on ASAP Rocks.
