= Yeng Versions Live =

Live album by Yeng Constantino
- Released: August 4, 2011
- Recorded: 2010–2011
- Genre: Pop, R&B
- Length: 41:54
- Language: English, Filipino
- Label: Star Music
- Producer: Jack Rufo, Star Music

Yeng Constantino chronology
Lapit (2009)	Yeng Versions Live (2011)	Metamorphosis (2013)

Singles from Yeng Versions Live
- 1. "Paniwalaan Mo" Released: August 5, 2011

Yeng Versions Live is a debut live album by Filipino singer Yeng Constantino, released in the Philippines on August 5, 2011, by Star Music. The album consists of OPM Hits from the 1980s and 1990s.

== Background ==
The songs were recorded live in Teatrino Promenade, Greenhills. All of the tracks are OPM renditions, she picked the closest to her heart and her favorite songs. Eraserheads, APO Hiking Society and Rey Valera are her inspirations of recording the live album and she wants to pay tribute to them.

== Single ==
"Paniwalaan Mo" is the only single in the album. It was composed by Chito Ilacad.

== Track listing ==
No.	Title	Writer(s)	Length
1.	"Alapaap"	Ely Buendia	3:40
2.	"Mahirap Magmahal ng Syota ng Iba"	Jim Paredes	2:43
3.	"Paniwalaan Mo"	Chito Ilacad	3:36
4.	"Kumusta Ka"	Rey Valera	3:40
5.	"Even If"	Cecille Azarcon-Inocente	3:25
6.	"Kahapon Lamang"	George Canseco	3:47
7.	"Kahit Konti"	Gary Granada	3:17
8.	"Esem"	Westdon Abay	4:09
9.	"Banal Na Aso, Santong Kabayo"	Westdon Abay	5:04
10.	"Hawak Kamay - Salamat Medley"	Constantino	8:32
Total length:			41:54

== Certification ==
Region	Certification	Certified units/sales
Philippines (PARI)	Platinum	15,000^{*}
^{*} Sales figures based on certification alone.

== Release history ==
Country	Release date	Format	Label
Philippines	August 4, 2011	Compact Disc	Star Records
Philippines	August 4, 2011	Digital download	Star Records
