= All About Love (Yeng Constantino album) =

Studio album by Yeng Constantino
- Released: November 25, 2014
- Genre: OPM, Pop
- Label: Star Music

Yeng Constantino chronology
Metamorphosis (2013)	All About Love (2014)	Yeng 10 [10 Years of Yeng Constantino] (2016)

Singles from All About Love
- 1. "Ikaw" Released: August 23, 2014; 2. "What's Up Ahead (ft. Yan Asuncion)" Released: October 30, 2014

All About Love is the fifth studio album by Filipina singer-songwriter Yeng Constantino, released in the Philippines on November 25, 2014 by Star Music. This album was also the first-full Filipino album to be released on Spotify. The album peaked at number 5 on the Philippine Top-Selling Albums chart.

== Background ==
"[This album] will show the other side of myself being a musician... We decided to compile love songs because this is the season where I am in love and I want to share it to everyone." "

— Yeng, on the album.

All About Love is Constantino's attempt to tackle new sound beyond her mostly pop-rock image, and serves as a prelude to her wedding with fellow musician Yan Asuncion, which was held on February 14, 2015. The 10-track album includes two songs originally composed by Constantino, three songs written and composed by Asuncion, and the other songs by some of her favorite composers in the local music industry. The single "Ikaw" preceded the album, released with a music video on August 23, 2014.

== Track listing ==
No.	Title	Writer(s)	Length
1.	"Shining Like the Sun"	Yeng Constantino; Victor Christian Asuncion	3:34
2.	"Dance Without the Music"	Constantino	4:17
3.	"Ikaw"	Constantino	4:44
4.	"Dito Ka Lang Sa Tabi"	Toto Sorioso	4:44
5.	"Your Love is My Relief"	Constantino; Asuncion	4:06
6.	"Feels Like"	Gus Abarquez	4:15
7.	"What's Up Ahead (featuring Yan Asuncion)"	Constantino; Asuncion	2:41
8.	"So Beautiful"	Jonathan Manalo	4:18
9.	"Ferris Wheel"	Jed Dumawal	4:15
10.	"Una't Huling Pag-Ibig"	Ebe Dancel	4:27

=== Note ===
Writer credits based on a news released by ABS-CBN Public Relations website.

== Release history ==
Country	Release date	Format	Label
Philippines	November 25, 2014	CD	Star Music
Philippines	October 30, 2014	Digital download	Star Music
