= Yeng Constantino =

Filipino singer (born 1988)

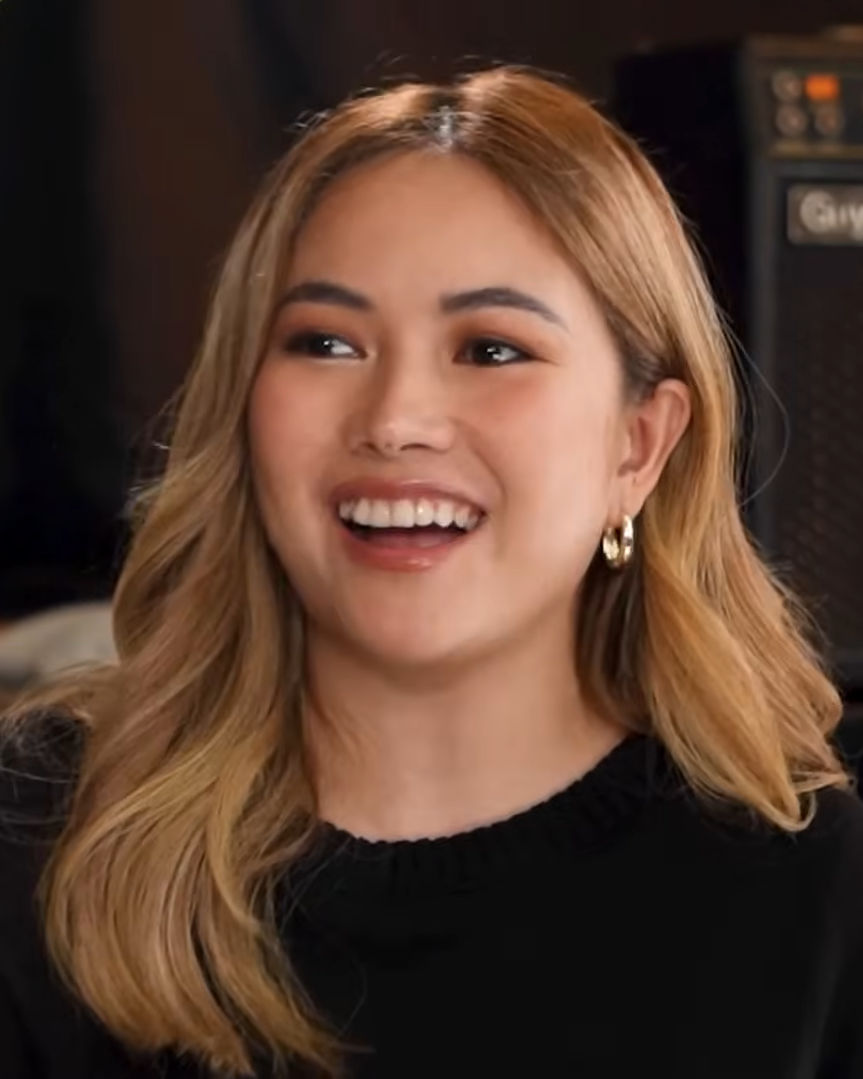
- Constantino in 2023

Background information
- Born: Josephine Eusebio Constantino; December 4, 1988 (age 37); Rodriguez, Rizal, Philippines
- Genres: OPM; alternative pop; pop; Pinoy rock; pop rock
- Occupations: Singer; songwriter; composer; guitarist
- Years active: 2006–present
- Labels: Star Music (2006–2022); Star Magic (2006–2022); Cornerstone Entertainment; Republic Records Philippines (2023–present)
- Spouse: Victor Asuncion (m. 2015)

Josephine "Yeng" Eusebio Constantino-Asuncion (born December 4, 1988) is a Filipino singer, songwriter, composer and guitarist. She is considered the Philippines' Pop Rock Royalty. In 2006, she earned the title "Grand Star Dreamer" in the inaugural season of Pinoy Dream Academy, the Philippine edition of Endemol's reality TV show Star Academy.

Constantino was honored with around 70 accolades and recognitions including a FAMAS Award, 7 Awit Awards, 9 Myx Music Awards and 5 PMPC Star Awards for Music. In 2020, Ikaw reached the 100 million mark on YouTube, becoming the second most viewed OPM music video by a female artist in the Philippines. In 2023, Constantino signed with Republic Records. The same year, she was named as the global ambassadress of Academy of Rock, the only music school in Singapore devoted to teaching rock and popular music.

CNN Philippines listed "Hawak Kamay" at number 12 in their list of the Best Filipino Love Songs of the last 25 years. As an actress, Constantino has starred in the film Write About Love and took home the Best Supporting Actress Award in MMFF 2019. As of May 2023, Constantino had well over 350 million career streams on Spotify, becoming one of the most streamed Filipino artists of all time.

== Personal life ==
Constantino is the youngest of five siblings. She is a second cousin of television host and Pinoy Big Brother: Teen Edition Plus second big placer Robi Domingo. Her family was raised as born-again Christians.

By June 2013, Constantino began a relationship with Victor "Yan" Asuncion, a fellow musician and worship director at Victory Christian Fellowship. In March 2014 Constantino announced her engagement to Asuncion through an Instagram post. On February 14, 2015, the couple married at a resort in Tagaytay, Cavite.

== Career ==
=== 2006–07: Pinoy Dream Academy, career beginnings and Hawak Kamay ===
On August 27, 2006, Yeng Constantino auditioned for the inaugural season of the singing competition Pinoy Dream Academy. In December, Constantino won the competition after garnering 697,648 votes (37.32%), becoming the first "Grand Star Dreamer", followed by Jay-R Siaboc as the first runner-up.

After winning, Star Music launched Constantino's debut album entitled Salamat, containing 10 songs, seven of which were original compositions by Constantino. Her album reached Gold Record status two weeks after its release and then later went Platinum after a month, followed by a "3× Platinum Record" certification several months later.

On February 28, 2008, her second album, Journey was launched. The lead single is "Ikaw Lang Talaga". The album contains 12 tracks, some of which were written by Yeng. The album reached Gold status.

Sometime in November 2008, Constantino became a member of the all-female group Y.R.S., a group composed of Constantino, Rachelle Ann Go and Sarah Geronimo that was a segment of ASAP '08 until its disbandment in March/April 2010 following Go's transfer to GMA Network.

=== 2009–12: Lapit and Yeng Versions Live ===
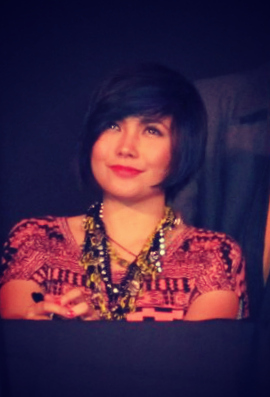
Yeng Constantino in 2011 during her concert in Calgary, Alberta

Lapit, her third studio album, was released digitally on Star Records' official website on October 9, 2009. It was later released in physical format in music stores in the Philippines. A week after that, the album was pulled due to technical errors in the album tracklisting and was then re-released before its grand album launch on November 1, 2009.

In March 2010, Constantino began her first regular television hosting stint as co-host of Music Uplate Live, a late-night musical variety show, along with Tutti Caringal, Gee Canlas, and Martin Concio. The show aired on ABS-CBN until September 2011.

On October 5, 2011, Star Records released her first live album, entitled Yeng Versions Live, on which she sings 80s and 90s OPM hits. It achieved Platinum status.

=== 2013: Transformation and Metamorphosis ===
She released her fourth studio album entitled Metamorphosis on January 28, 2013. Its first single, "B.A.B.A.Y", was released to radio stations earlier that month on January 9. The music video for the second single, "Chinito", premiered on May 24, 2013, on Myx Channel. It features Filipino actor Enchong Dee as Constantino's love interest. The third single, "Sandata", was released on July 3, 2013.

In November 2013, Yeng released her international single "Better Than Yesterday," a pop song featuring prominent drums and rap courtesy of Singaporean rapper, actor and radio personality Sheikh Haikel. The track was produced and written by Shorya Sharma.

This album reached Gold status in December 2014.

=== 2014–15: All About Love and The Voice Kids ===
Her fifth album, All About Love, was her attempt to tackle new genres beyond her pop-rock image. It was released on iTunes on October 30, 2014, and on CD on November 27, 2014. The music video for the first single, "Ikaw" premiered on August 30 on Myx Channel. On December 13, 2015, the album was awarded Gold and Platinum awards on ASAP for reaching 15,000 sold copies.

In May 2015, Constantino announced that she would co-host the second season of The Voice Kids, alongside Luis Manzano and her cousin Robi Domingo, replacing Alex Gonzaga. The season aired on ABS-CBN from June 6 to August 30, 2015.

=== 2016: Tenth year celebrations ===
In 2016, Constantino was announced to be one of the mentors of the reality show We Love OPM: The Celebrity Sing-Offs, which ran from May 14 – July 17, 2016. Her team is named Oh My Girls, which was composed of Ylona Garcia, Krissha Viaje and Alexa Ilacad. Oh My Girls placed second overall throughout the entire show's run.

In May 2015, Constantino announced plans to release a musical in 2016 that would feature her discography from the past years to celebrate her tenth year in the music industry. It was titled Ako Si Josephine. Later in 2016, Constantino joined the judging panel of ABS-CBN's reality singing competition show Pinoy Boyband Superstar, along with Vice Ganda, Aga Muhlach and Sandara Park.

=== 2016–20; 2023: DIVAS ===
On April 27, 2016, Constantino was announced to be part of the DIVAS Live in Manila concert, along with Kyla, KZ Tandingan and Angeline Quinto. Rachelle Ann Go was originally going to also be part of the concert lineup, but had to withdraw due to international commitments. The concert was held on November 11, 2016,

On December 15, 2018, Constantino, Tandingan, Quinto and Kyla teamed up again at the Smart Araneta Coliseum for another concert, this time with Boyz II Men, titled Boyz II Men with DIVAS.

From July to August 2023, Kyla, Yeng and KZ, toured in the United States and Canada following the Cornerstone All Star Concert for another tour, titled Vocal Champs, with Jason Dy as their special guest for the tour.

=== 2018: Synesthesia ===
In 2018, Constantino released her sixth studio album titled Synesthesia. The album spawned four singles, including "Pinipigil" and the hit single "Ako Muna". The song is a pop ballad and an emotional and self-empowering anthem. Constantino performed the song live on Wish 107.5 bus and it earned 7.2 million views on YouTube. She also performed the song in It's Showtime. The song became a radio hit in the Philippines and peaked at number six on the Myx Daily Top Ten music videos chart, and number ten on the MOR Pinoy Biga10 radio chart. The song also played in the radio in the United Kingdom with six spin and in Sweden. The music video of "Ako Muna" was released in March 2018 on YouTube and was directed by Miguel Alomajan, earning 9.8 million views on YouTube. Two more singles on the album released: "Tahimik" and "Dasal."

=== 2023: New record label ===
In 2023, Constantino was named the global ambassadress of the Academy of Rock, a musical school in Singapore devoted to teaching rock and popular music. In the same year, Constantino left Star Music and Star Magic after signing with Republic Records Philippines.

In 2025, Constantino was announced as a guest performer in the Kolorcoaster overseas concert tour by Maki in November, with stops in the United Arab Emirates and Qatar. She also performed at the concert's Philippine leg at the Araneta Coliseum in Quezon City on November 7.

In 2026, Constantino announced her concert tour for her 20th anniversary titled Biyaheng Bente. Multiple tour dates were scheduled for Quezon City, Laguna, Cebu City and Imus City, including US dates in Oakland, California, Stafford, Texas, and Los Angeles.

== Artistry ==
=== Influences ===
Her early influences include Canadian singers Alanis Morissette and Avril Lavigne; American country music singers LeAnn Rimes, Martina McBride and Trisha Yearwood; pop punk/rock bands the Ataris, Blink 182, Sum 41, The Starting Line, Coheed and Cambria, Yellowcard and Sandwich; and Filipina rock singers Acel Bisa, Kitchie Nadal and Barbie Almalbis.

In November 2014, she revealed on her website that she was a fan of contemporary stars Demi Lovato, Taylor Swift, Hayley Williams and Avril Lavigne.

== Filmography ==
=== Film ===
- 2012: Kimmy Dora & The Temple of Kiyeme (cameo)
- 2013: Shift (Estela)
- 2018: The Eternity Between Seconds (Sam)
- 2019: Write About Love (Joyce)
- 2020: You Animal (Voice Actress)

=== Television/Digital ===
Year	Title	Role
2005–2006	SMS: Sunday Mall Show	Herself/Guest
2006	Pinoy Dream Academy	Contestant
2006–present	ASAP	Performer / Host
2007	Your Song: "Pangarap Lang"	Singer / Cameo
2007	Your Song: "Cool Off"	Singer / Cameo
2007	Your Song: "If We Fall In Love"	Singer / Cameo
2007	Your Song: "Salamat"	Singer / Cameo
2007	Myx Music Awards 2007	Host
2008	Pinoy Dream Academy: Season 2 – Special Primer	Host
2010–2011	Music Uplate Live	Host
2015	Aquino & Abunda Tonight	Herself
2015	The Voice Kids (season 2)	Co-host
2016	We Love OPM	Mentor of Oh My Girls
2016	Pinoy Boyband Superstar	Judge
2016–present	It's Showtime	Judge in Tawag ng Tanghalan
2021	Saying Goodbye	Herself
2026	Your Face Sounds Familiar (season 4)	Herself/Guest with Enchong Dee
2026	The Voice Kids	Herself / Coach / Judge

== Discography ==
=== Studio albums ===
- 2007: Salamat
- 2008: Journey
- 2009: Lapit
- 2013: Metamorphosis
- 2014: All About Love
- 2018: Synesthesia

=== Live albums ===
- 2011: Yeng Versions Live

=== Compilation albums ===
- 2006: Pinoy Dream Academy Originals (Volume 1)
- 2006: Pinoy Dream Academy Originals (Volume 2)
- 2006: Pinoy Dream Academy Originals (Volume 3)
- 2006: Pinoy Dream Academy Originals (Volume 4)
- 2007: Star Magic Christmas Album
- 2007: Judy Ann Santos: Musika ng Buhay Ko
- 2007: Nagmamahal Kapamilya Album
- 2008: My Girl OST Album
- 2008: Musika at Pelikula
- 2010: 60 Taon ng Musika at Soap Opera Album
- 2010: i-star 15 Anniversary Collection (The Best of TV and Movie Themes)
- 2010: Ngayong Pasko Magniningning ang Pilipino (Christmas Songs Compilation)
- 2011: OPM Number 1's Vol. 2
- 2011: Bida Best Hits Da Best Album
- 2011: Da Best ang Pasko ng Pilipino Album
- 2012: OPM Number 1's Vol. 3
- 2012: The Reunion An Eraserheads Tribute Album
- 2013: Himig Handog P-Pop Lovesongs Album
- 2014: The Next Step Vol. 2 Album (Academy of Rock)
- 2014: Star Cinema 20th Commemorative Album
- 2014: Transforming Love Album (CBN Asia)

== Awards and recognitions ==
2007

- Compilation Awardee ("Nagmamahal Kapamilya Album"): 3rd ASAP Platinum Circle Awards
- Female Awardee ("Salamat"): 3rd ASAP Platinum Circle Awards
- Best New Artist: 2007 Aliw Awards
- Favorite New Artist: 1st OPM Songhits 2007 Awards
- Top 40 Brand Award: 1st OPM Songhits 2007 Awards
- Best Theme Song (Kasal Kasali Kasalo's "Hawak Kamay"): 55th FAMAS Awards 2007
- Breakthrough Artist: 1st OPM Songhits Awards 2007
- Hitmaker Of The Year: Yeng Constantino (7 hit songs for the year 2007): 1st Megamixx Radio Music Awards (Guam)
- Most Popular Song by a Duo ("If we fall in love" with RJ Jimenez): 2nd IFM Pinoy Music Awards

2008

- Pop Music Video ("Himig ng Pag-Ibig"): ASAP Pop Viewer's Choice Awards 2008
- Awit Awards 2008: "People's Choice Favorite Song of the Year" – "Salamat"
- Awit Awards 2008: "People's Choice FAvorite Music Video" – "Time-In"

2009

- Philippine Digital Music Awards 2009: "Best Female Artist"
- 1st Waki OPM Awards 2009 – "Album of the Year"
- Star Magic 3rd Annual Ball 2009 – "Most Fashion Forward"
- ASAP 24K Gold Award – "Journey" Album

2010

- Tambayan 101.9 OPM Awards 2010: "Female Artist of the Year"
- Awit Awards 2010: "Texters' Choice Song of the Year" – "Lapit"
- PMPC Star Awards for Music 2010: "Album of the Year" – "Lapit"

2011

- Myx Music Awards 2011: "Favorite Music Video" – "Jeepney Love Story"
- Myx Music Awards 2011: "Favorite Song" – "Jeepney Love Story"
- Myx Music Awards 2011: "Favorite Female Artist"
- Myx Music Awards 2011: "Favorite Collaboration" – "Kung Wala Na Nga – 6cyclemind Feat. Kean Cipriano & Yeng Constantino"
- Myx Music Awards 2011: "Favorite Myx Celebrity VJ"
- ASAP 24K Gold Award – "Yeng Versions Live"

2012

- Myx Music Awards 2012: "Favorite Female Artist"
- PMPC Star Awards for Music 2012: "Female Rock Artist of the Year"

2013

- Named as Academy of Rock's Ambassadress
- Rock School London: Honorary Licentiate Diploma
- MYX Music Awards 2013: "Favorite Female Artist"
- PMPC Star Awards for Music 2013: "Rock Album of the Year" – "Metamorphosis"
- PMPC Star Awards for Music 2013: "Music Video of the Year" – "Chinito"

2014

- Star Cinema Online Awards 2014 "Favorite Star Cinema Movie Themesong: Chinito"
- Internet Gateway's Most Downloaded Artist for 2013
- Internet Gateway's Most Downloaded Song 2013: Chinito
- Myx Music Awards 2014: "Favorite Female Artist"
- MOR Pinoy Music Awards 2014: "Song of the Year: Chinito"

2015

- Alta Media Icon Awards 2015 – Best Music Video: Ikaw – Yeng Constantino
- 28th Awit Awards 2015 – Song of the Year: Ikaw – Yeng Constantino/Star Music
- 2015 PMPC Star Awards for Music – Song of the Year: Ikaw – Yeng Constantino/Star Music
- Digital Push Awards 2015 – Push Tweet Favorite Music Artist
- Digital Push Awards 2015 – Push Gram Most Loved Music Artist
- Digital Push Awards 2015 – Push Play Best Music Artist

2016

- Anak TV Awards 2016 – Female Makabata Star
- Wish 107.5 Music Awards 2016 Best WISHclusive Performance by a Female Artist "Ikaw" – Yeng Constantino
- Push Awards 2016 Digital Media Pushlike Female Celebrity
- Push Awards 2016 Digital Media Pushtweet Music Artist
- Push Awards 2016 Digital Media Pushplay Female Celebrity
- Push Awards 2016 Digital Media Push Elite
- Myx Music Awards 2016: Favorite Mellow Video – Dance Without the Music – Yeng Constantino

2017

- 7th EdukCircle Awards – Female Music Artist of the Year
- Golden Laurel LPU Batangas Media Awards – Best Female Singer

2018

- Paragala: The Central Luzon Media Awards 2018 – Best Female Recording Artist
- Bulacan State University Batarisang Awards – Batarisang Pangmusika
- Metro Society – Most Influential People on Social Media
- 3rd Wish 107.5 Music Awards- Wishclusive Elite Circle Bronze Awardee
- 3rd GIC Innovative Award for Television – Most Innovative TV Singer

2021

- PMPC: 12th Star Awards for music — Rock Artist of the Year

Year	Award giving body	Category	Nominated work	Results
2007	ASAP '07 24K Awards	Female Artist Awardee	—N/a	Won
2007	ASAP Pop Viewer's Choice Awards	Pop Movie Theme Song	"Hawak Kamay"(Kasal Kasali Kasalo)	Won
2007	ASAP Pop Viewer's Choice Awards	Pop Music Video	"Time In"	Won
2007	GMMSF Box-Office Entertainment Awards	Most Promising Female Recording/Concert Artist	—N/a	Won
2007	GMMSF Box-Office Entertainment Awards	Best New Female Singer	—N/a	Won
2007	2nd IFM Pinoy Music Awards	Extremely Requested Videoke Song	"Hawak Kamay"	Won
2007	Metro Manila Film Festival	Best Theme Song	"Hawak Kamay"(Kasal Kasali Kasalo)	Won
2008	Awit Awards	Best Album of the Year	Salamat	Won
2008	Awit Awards	Best Selling Album	Salamat	Won
2008	Awit Awards	Best Inspirational/Religious Recording	"Salamat"	Won
2008	Awit Awards	Song of the Year (People's Choice Award)	"Salamat"	Won
2008	Awit Awards	Music Video of the Year (People's Choice Award)	"Time In"	Won
2008	Awit Awards	Song of the Year	"Salamat"	Nominated
2008	Awit Awards	Best Christmas Recording	"Ikaw at Ako"	Nominated
2008	Awit Awards	Best Christmas Recording	"Pasko sa Pinas"	Nominated
2008	Awit Awards	Music Video of the Year	"Time In"	Nominated

== See also ==
- Pinoy Dream Academy
- ABS-CBN
- Star Music
- ASAP
- Star Magic

Preceded by First	Pinoy Dream Academy; Grand Star Dreamer; 2006	Succeeded by Laarni Lozada
