= Journey (Yeng Constantino album) =

Studio album by Yeng Constantino
- Released: February 29, 2008
- Recorded: September–December 2007
- Genre: Pop rock
- Length: 50:37
- Label: Star Music
- Producer: Dream Big Productions

Yeng Constantino chronology
| Salamat (2007) | Journey (2008) | Lapit (2009) |

Singles from Journey
- 1. "Habambuhay" Released: December 2007; 2. "Ikaw Lang Talaga" Released: March 2008; 3. "Di Na Ganun" Released: August 2008; 4. "Himig ng Pag-ibig" Released: October 2008

Journey is the second studio album by a Filipino singer Yeng Constantino, released on February 29, 2008 via Star Music. The album contains twelve tracks: six were composed by Constantino, two were a collaboration of Constantino and Morning Glory. Journey sold more than 15,000 copies and is certified Gold. It was followed by her third album, Lapit.

== Track listing ==
1. "Di Na Ganun" (Constantino) - 4:57
2. "Ikaw Lang Talaga" (Constantino) - 2:52
3. "Promise" (Constantino) - 4:23
4. "Pili Ka Lang" (Constantino) - 3:55
5. "Tao Lang Ako" ( Constantino ) - 4:44
6. "What About Us" (Constantino) - 4:33
7. "Himig Ng Pag-ibig" (Lolita Carbon) - 4:21
8. "Bakit Nga Ba" ( Annabelle Ragalado-Borja [Words] & Allan Danug [Music] ) - 3:49
9. "If You Go" (Eman Abatayo) - 4:58
10. "Why Can't You" (Constantino & Morning Glory) - 4:03
11. "Tala" (Constantino & Morning Glory) - 4:09
12. "Habambuhay" ( Annabelle Ragalado-Borja [Words] & Allan Danug [Music] ) - 3:53

== Singles ==
- "Habambuhay" was the first single from the album, and was used as the official soundtrack to the 2007 blockbuster movie, Sakal, Sakali, Saklolo, starring Judy Ann Santos and Ryan Agoncillo, where it is nominated for the Best Theme Song of the Year.
- "Ikaw Lang Talaga" was the second single from the album. The song was used as the official theme song for both Taiwanese drama, Why Why Love and Miss No Good, starring Rainie Yang. Both series aired on ABS-CBN network in 2009.
- "Di Na Ganun" was the third single. The song was used as sub-theme for television series, The Wedding and Promise, both starred in by Anne Curtis.
- "Himig Ng Pag-Ibig" was the fourth and last single from the album. The song was used as the official theme song of the television drama/fantasy series, Dyosa, starring Anne Curtis.

Just like her previous album, most of the singles from the Journey album were used as theme songs for ABS-CBN's teleserye (television series) and movie outfit.

== Chart performance ==
"Journey", had debuted at No. 14 on March 15, 2008 and peaked at No. 8 by the end of the month. It stayed for three months in the Top 20 Albums of 2008.

| Date | Peak position |
|---|---|
| 2008 | 8 |

== Certification ==
Journey's Gold Certification was given to Yeng in August 2009 at the TV program ASAP.

| Region | Certification | Certified units/sales |
|---|---|---|
| Philippines (PARI) | Gold | 15,000^{*} |
^{*} Sales figures based on certification alone.

== Awards and recognition ==
2009

- WRR 101.9 WAKI OPM Award: "Best Album of the year" - "Journey".

2008

- Pop Music Video ("Himig ng Pag-Ibig"): ASAP Pop Viewer's Choice Awards 2008
