= RJ Jimenez =

Filipino musician

- Born: Ryan Jay Jimenez; September 17, 1983 (age 42); Pasig
- Occupation: singer/guitarist
- Years active: 2006–present

Ryan Jay Jimenez (born September 17, 1983), better known as RJ Jimenez, is a Filipino singer and guitarist, known for competing on Pinoy Dream Academy.

== Early life ==
Jimenez was born on September 17, 1983, in Pasig. He graduated electronics and communications engineering at the University of Santo Tomas.

== Discography ==
=== Studio album ===
Artist	Album	Tracks	Year	Records
RJ Jimenez	RJ JMNZ	Sa Wakas (Tuesday Sequel); Superstar; True Love Waits; Oo; Magandang Lahi; In Love; All My Life; Wag Na Lang; Magasin; Can't Make You Smile; Ako; Miss Kita Pag Tuesday; It's All About Your Love	2006	Star Music

== Filmography ==
=== TV Guesting ===
- Maalaala Mo Kaya
