= Lapit =

Studio album by Yeng Constantino
- Released: October 9, 2009
- Genre: Pop rock
- Length: 50:37
- Label: Star Music
- Producer: Raimund Marasigan

Yeng Constantino chronology
Journey (2008)	Lapit (2009)	Yeng Versions Live (2011)

Singles from Lapit
- 1. "Lapit" Released: December 2009; 2. "Wag Kang Magtatanong" Released: March 2010; 3. "Jeepney Love Story" Released: June 2010; 4. "’Wag Na" Released: January 2011; 5. "Siguro" Released: July 2011

Lapit (Filipino, "Closer") is the third studio album by Filipina singer-composer Yeng Constantino. The album was released on October 9, 2009, via Star Music through digital distribution from the record label's website and later in music stores in the Philippines. After a week, it was pulled out of display shelves due to some technical errors in the album and is expected to be released again in a week before the album's grand launch on November 1, 2009. The album contains ten OPM tracks, all composed by Constantino, with the collaboration of Morning Glory. Raimund Marasigan is the producer of this album. Its carrier single is "Lapit", a rock-inspirational song.

== Background and production ==
Constantino suffered writer's block for almost nine months, delaying the release of this album. In an interview she stated that she felt pressured after the hit singles from her first album, "Hawak Kamay" and "Salamat", and was apprehensive that her third album would not be as successful after reading negative reviews about her second album Journey. These articles criticized her compositions as "just a cycle of tunes" and labeled her as an "overnight sensation". The inspirational advice of Raimund Marasigan, the former drummer of the now defunct band The Eraserheads, who promised to co-produce her third album, restored her spirit and motivation for songwriting and resulted in the ten tracks she wrote for Lapit.

== Release and commercial success ==
Lapit was released digitally via Star Records' official website on October 9, 2009, then in physical formats in music stores nationwide. A week later the album was pulled due to technical errors in the album track listing and was re-released before its grand album launch on November 1, 2009. Lapit would receive platinum status.

"Lapit" was the lead single from the album, and Constantino's 14th top ten hit. The lyrics of the song had a resemblance with her first single which was "Hawak Kamay", an inspirational rock vibe. As of July 2013 the music video of the song scored 2.87 million views on YouTube and became her second most viewed video, after "Jeepney Love Story", until August 2013 when it was surpassed by her single "Chinito". "Lapit" was used on the soundtrack for the ABS-CBN TV series Kung Tayo'y Magkakalayo and Minsan Lang Kita Iibigin. The song reached the top of I FM Chart in the last week of 2009. In 2010 it won the Awit Awards "Texters' Choice Song of the Year".

"Wag Kang Magtatanong" is a mid-tempo pop ballad written by Costantino. The song was released in March 2010 and it was decided as the official second offering single from this album.

"Jeepney Love Story" debut at number eighteen on July 3, 2010, in Tambayan Top 20. It replaced Jovit Baldivino's rendition of "Too Much Love Will Kill You" at the number one spot. A music video was released in July 2010. The concept of the music video was an inspired animated one, in which the video shows Ivan Dorschner of Pinoy Big Brother: Teen Clash 2010 as the guy referring in the song, eventually disembarking the Jeepney, and unexpected cameo role by Filipino actor Piolo Pascual as a passenger, which replaced the seat of Dorschner. As of December 2013 the music video of the song scored 10 million views on YouTube and became her most viewed video. It won Myx Music Awards 2011 and Favorite Music Video Myx Music Awards 2011, Favorite Song.

"Wag Na" is her third single off the album. The song debut at number five on January 22, 2011, in Tambayan Top 20. So far it has reached 2 million views in YouTube. The song was Yeng Constantino's 20th top 10 songs. To date "Wag Na" music video reached 7.5 million views on YouTube with the official video and the other uploaded music video.

"Siguro" is the fifth single from the album. It was released in the Philippines in July 2011. The director of her music video was Avid Liongoren, produce by Yeng Constantino her Assistant Director was Jan Parma and director of Photography is courtesy by "Macky Galvez". On April 15, 2013, the song used as the official theme song for Koreanovela To the Beautiful You. To date "Siguro" music video reached 6.3 million views on YouTube with the official video and the other upload video.

== Track listing ==
1. "Lapit" (Constantino) – 4:39
2. "Jeepney Love Story" (Constantino) – 5:16
3. "Wag Ka Magtatanong" (Constantino) – 3:32
4. "Akin Ka Na" (Constantino) – 3:54
5. "Pag Ayaw Mo Na" (Constantino) – 4:48
6. "Takas" (Constantino) – 4:47
7. "Ligaw" (Constantino) – 5:22
8. "Siguro" (Constantino) – 3:59
9. "Maghihintay" (Constantino) – 3:57
10. "Wag Na" (Constantino) – 4:17
11. "Takas and Jeepney Love Story (Acoustic Version)" (Constantino) – 3:18

== Personnel and music videos ==
=== Credits ===
- Acoustic Guitar – Yeng Constantino
- Bass – Emerson Gamat (tracks: 10)
- Bass, Guitar, Keyboards – Buddy Zabala
- Drums – Kevin Cruz (tracks: 10)
- Drums, Guitar, Keyboards, Percussion – Raymund Marasigan
- Executive Producer – Malou N. Santos
- Executive-Producer – Annabelle Regalado-Borja
- Lead Guitar – Paul John Ibarra (tracks: 10)
- Photography – Ronnie Salvacion
- Producer – Raymund Marasigan
- Producer [Additional] – Buddy Zabala
- Rhythm Guitar – Nino Pabillano
- Songwriter – Yeng Constantino (tracks: All)
- Vocals – Yeng Constantino
- Music videos

All of her music video from this album are directed by Avid Liongoren.

- "Lapit"
- "Wag Kang Magtatanong"
- "Jeepney Love Story"
- "Wag Na"
- "Siguro"

== Charts ==
Chart (2009)	Peak position
Star Records PH (Digital Downloads)	1
Philippine Albums Chart	18
