= Pinoy Dream Academy =

Philippine television program

- Season 1 title card
- Genre: Reality competition
- Based on: Star Academy (Operación Triunfo)
- Country of origin: Philippines
- Original language: Filipino
- No. of seasons: 2

Production
- Production location: Philippines
- Camera setup: Multiple-camera setup
- Running time: 30–35 minutes
- Production companies: ABS-CBN Studios; Endemol

Original release
- Network: ABS-CBN
- Release: August 27, 2006 – October 5, 2008

Pinoy Dream Academy (also known as PDA) is a Philippine television reality competition show broadcast by ABS-CBN. Originally hosted by Toni Gonzaga, Nikki Gil, Sam Milby, Bianca Gonzalez and Roxanne Barcelo. it aired on the network's weekend line-up from August 27, 2006 to October 5, 2008, replacing U Can Dance and was replaced by Kahit Isang Saglit and The Singing Bee. Gonzaga, Gil and Billy Crawford serve as the final hosts.

ABS-CBN affiliate Studio 23 airs a companion program under the same title. It is a separate show from the flagship station that will feature scenes that were not shown on the main program and has different hosts.

Awit ng Pangarap ("Song of the Dream"), made during the show's first season run by contestants Yeng Constantino, Yvan Lambatan, and Kristoff Abrenica, is the main theme song of the show, although "We're All In This Together" was used earlier in the pre-season specials as the unofficial theme song of the first season. Awit ng Pangarap was officially sung by the first season's scholars (billed as the PDA All-Stars) and was used starting in the middle of the first season. A version by Constantino alone is being used for the second season.

== Academy ==
The facade of the Academy

Like the Pinoy Big Brother House, the Academy is found facing the ABS-CBN studios in Quezon City. Although it seemed that the Academy building is erected right next to the House, in reality, both the House and the Academy are actually one multi-room studio, with its interior renovated alternately according to the program.

Rooms in the Academy included the administration rooms, dance studio, and, piano room and classroom, as well as the living quarters and kitchen, all of which used to be the original area of the Pinoy Big Brother House. The entire Academy area was re-renovated as the House area for the run of the said program's second season and its succeeding editions; the Academy's rooms make a return in the second season, albeit with a different layout.

Next to the House is a large auditorium called the PDA Concert Hall where the Gala Nights are held. It is otherwise known as the PBB Eviction Hall because eviction ceremonies for Pinoy Big Brother (season 2) and Pinoy Big Brother: Celebrity Edition 2 also took place there.

== Faculty ==
The faculty of the Academy is composed of at least four persons specialized in music, performance arts and humanistic arts, and the media. It is led by the Headmaster, who oversees the activities inside the Academy and also teaches and guides the scholars in their growth as performers. Headmasters for Season 1 was Jim Paredes of Apo Hiking Society, while for Season 2 was Maestro Ryan Cayabyab a.k.a. Mr. C.

== Life in the Academy and Gala Nights ==
The contestants' life inside the Academy is chronicled on the nightly episodes from Monday to Friday. This includes the classes the students have to take and their domestic time outside of these classes.

The episodes shown on Saturday (sometimes known as the Gala Nights) showcase the talents of the contestants, and exemplifies the progress of each of them in regards to their education in the Academy. In these nights, they mostly show singing performances, although in some cases, there are also dance numbers prepared by the scholars themselves.

Every Sunday, the contestants are assessed by the jury from the performance night. The probationary students and the Star Scholar was determined in this episode. The probationary students are the four scholars who obtained the lowest scores in the performance night while Star Scholar is the one who gets the highest. In the first season, if a scholar obtains the highest score from the judges for two consecutive weeks, that scholar will only get the title of Star Scholar in the first week; the title then has to be passed to the second highest pointing scholar in the second week. However, this ruling was changed in the second season, allowing a scholar to be the Star Scholar of the week for several consecutive weeks.

== Seasons ==
=== Season I ===
The first season was announced as early as finale of Pinoy Big Brother: Teen Edition 1, initially hiring only 16 scholars. During the month of August 2006, profiles of the potential scholars from all over the Philippines and several cities around the world were aired. The final 16 were chosen on August 27, 2006, in front of the Cebu Provincial Capitol Grounds. Four more were added the next night after some reconsideration as part of a surprise twist.

Nikki Gil was the main host of the weekday and Sunday primetime shows in this season, narrating the events inside the Academy. Gil was then joined by Bianca Gonzalez, Roxanne Barcelo, and Toni Gonzaga during the Saturday Gala Nights. Sam Milby was also part of the Saturday shows, but had stopped appearing mid-season. Barcelo also hosted the UpLate edition of the show.

The faculty was headed by Jim Paredes of the Apo Hiking Society, and initially had Maribeth Bichara as dance teacher, Moy Ortiz as voice teacher, and Gretchen Malalad as fitness instructor. Later additions to the Academy's faculty included the rest of Ortiz's group The CompanY, movie director Jose Javier Reyes, comedienne Malou de Guzman, Sandwich front man Raimund Marasigan, and actress Boots Anson Roa.

The first season took 16 weeks, culminating in the finale, dubbed as the "Grand Dream Night" at the Araneta Coliseum on December 16, 2006, with six scholars remaining. From these six, the top three, Yeng Constantino, Jay-R Siaboc and Ronnie Liang, moved further into the final showdown, each having solo performances. Constantino emerged as the show's "Grand Star Dreamer," garnering 697,648 votes or 37.32% of the almost three million votes cast since December 2 of that year.

=== Season II ===
Auditions for the second season began as early as November 2007 in several key cities in the Philippines as well as the cities of Dubai, Milan, and Madrid. These auditions were also held at the same time as those for Pinoy Big Brother: Teen Edition 2 (later to be called Pinoy Big Brother: Teen Edition Plus) and the third season of Pinoy Big Brother.

Meanwhile, after the announcement of the moving of the Philippine Idol franchise (titled Philippine Idol) from ABC to ABS-CBN's main rival GMA Network (there renamed as Pinoy Idol), there were already reports that because of their connections with ABS-CBN, Philippine Idol judge Ryan Cayabyab and host Ryan Agoncillo will join the Academy instead of reprising their roles in Pinoy Idol. Eventually, Cayabyab was named the Academy's new Headmaster, but Agoncillo was shut out of the hosting plum. Instead, Billy Crawford was chosen as a new host for the show, heading the late afternoon show Pinoy Dream Academy Über-ture (which has a format similar to Pinoy Big Brother Über). Toni Gonzaga and Nikki Gil also alternate as main host for the second season.

Joining Cayabyab in the Academy's new faculty are Jose Javier Reyes (reprising his role as the Media Performance teacher) and Kitchie Molina and Monet Silvestre (voice teachers).

For nine Saturdays during the run of Pinoy Big Brother: Teen Edition Plus, a primer segment was aired detailing the thirty-two potential scholars and their backgrounds. From these 32, the final roster of scholars would be chosen, to be aired in a series of episodes called The Dream BIGins starting June 9, 2008.

The Academy had its second grand opening night (and therefore its formal premiere) on June 14, 2008. One unique feature is the division of the scholars into two "organizations." The process of probation has also been modified, allowing those within the Academy to save their choices first before the public voting. After the first probation, the process of saving a co-scholar has been modified, the scholars will then now choose who they would want to see stay as a probationary student and be subjected to viewers' votes.

The second season took 13 weeks, culminating in the two-day finale, dubbed as the "Grand Dream Nights" at the Cuneta Astrodome on September 13 and 14, 2008 with six scholars remaining. After the six had their final performances on the first night, the top three, Bugoy Drilon (real name Jay Drilon Bogayan), Laarni Lozada (real surname Losala), and Philippine Idol finalist Miguel Mendoza were immediately declared the next night. Lozada emerged as the show's second "Grand Star Dreamer."

=== Little Dreamers ===
The "Little Dreamers" competition was also launched on July 6, 2008, concurrently during the second season. It features twelve children aged six to ten with good singing talent.

== Talent piracy controversy ==
Philippine Idol, Associated Broadcasting Company's (ABC) franchise of American Idol, alleged Pinoy Dream Academy conducted contestant piracy, with ABS-CBN employees even approaching a judge to "just let [some of] the contestants go." This came after ABC turned down ABS-CBN's offer to co-produce Philippine Idol.

ABS-CBN denied talent piracy in a letter sent to the Philippine Daily Inquirer, saying that they successfully staged competitions without poaching contestants from other contests and would fully respect a contestant's choice in which competition one would join.

ABC sent a formal letter of complaint to ABS-CBN, alleging that three Gold Passers of Philippine Idol became contestants of rival Pinoy Dream Academy. ABS-CBN did not comment on the letter, as none of the three talents questioned became a finalist of that show.
